= List of Trametes species =

Trametes is a genus of poroid fungi in the family Polyporaceae. As of December 2017, Index Fungorum accepts 195 species of Trametes:

A B C D E F G H I J K L M N O P Q R S T U V W X Y Z

== A ==
- Trametes aesculi (Fr.) Justo (2014)
- Trametes africana Ryvarden (2004) – Africa
- Trametes alaskana D.V.Baxter (1942)
- Trametes alba Ryvarden (2015) – Brazil
- Trametes albidorosea E.Bommer & M.Rousseau (1900)
- Trametes albocarneogilvida (Romell) S.Lundell (1946)
- Trametes allantospora Corner (1989)
- Trametes amplopora Lloyd (1936) – Philippines
- Trametes amygdalea Maire (1922)
- Trametes apiaria (Pers.) Zmitr., Wasser & Ezhov (2012)
- Trametes arcana Corner (1989)
- Trametes argenteiceps Corner (1989)
- Trametes atra Pat. (1906)
- Trametes atriceps Corner (1989)
- Trametes azurea (Fr.) G.Cunn. (1965) – New South Wales; Victoria

== B ==
- Trametes badiuscula Corner (1989)
- Trametes baldratiana Trotter (1925)
- Trametes barbulata Corner (1989)
- Trametes benetosta Corner (1989)
- Trametes benevestita Corner (1989)
- Trametes betulina
- Trametes biogilvoides Corner (1989)
- Trametes bresadolae Ryvarden (1988)
- Trametes brunnea Ryvarden (2013)
- Trametes brunneisetulosa Corner (1992)
- Trametes brunneoflava Lloyd (1923)
- Trametes brunneola (Berk.) Imazeki (1959) – Philippines
- Trametes butignotii Boud. ex Lloyd (1910)

== C ==
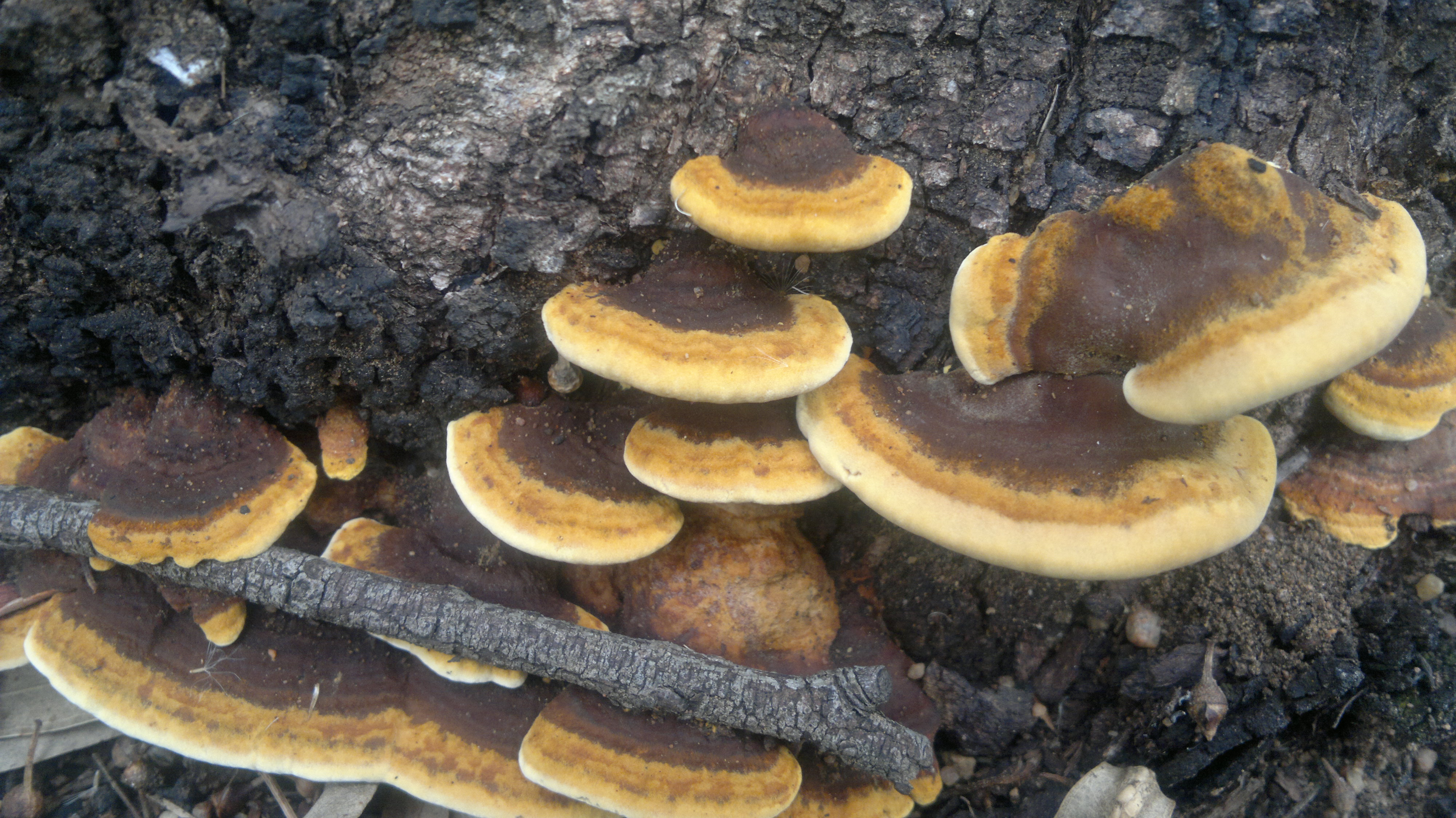
Trametes cingulata

- Trametes castaneifumosa Corner (1989)
- Trametes cincta Bose (1922)
- Trametes cinereosulfurea Ferd. & Winge (1949)
- Trametes cingulata Berk. (1854)
- Trametes cinnabarinus Karsten (1881) -- synonymous with Pycnoporus cinnabarinus
- Trametes citrina Bres. (1920)
- Trametes coccinea (Fr.) Hai J.Li & S.H.He (2014)
- Trametes cotonea (Pat. & Har.) Ryvarden (1972) – Africa
- Trametes cristobalensis Corner (1989)
- Trametes cubensis (Mont.) Sacc. (1891)
- Trametes cupreorosea Lloyd (1920)
- Trametes cystidiata I.Lindblad & Ryvarden (1999) – Costa Rica
- Trametes cystidiolophora B.K.Cui & H.J.Li (2010) – China

== D ==
- Trametes dealbata Kalchbr. ex G. Cunn. (1965)
- Trametes decorticans Corner (1989)
- Trametes decussata Pat. (1906)
- Trametes demoulinii G.Castillo (1994) – Papua New Guinea
- Trametes discoidea (Dicks.) Rauschert (1990)

== E ==
- Trametes ectypa (Berk. & M.A.Curtis) Gilb. & Ryvarden (1987) – United States
- Trametes effusa Speg. (1916)
- Trametes elegans (Spreng.) Fr. (1838)
- Trametes elevata Corner (1989)
- Trametes ellipsospora Ryvarden (1987) – Venezuela
- Trametes extensa (Berk.) Pat. (1900)

== F ==
- Trametes farcta Lloyd (1915)
- Trametes farinolens Corner (1989)
- Trametes favolipora (Pilát) Pilát (1939)
- Trametes febris Corner (1989)
- Trametes flammula Corner (1989)
- Trametes flavida (Lév.) Zmitr., Wasser & Ezhov (2012) (= Cubamyces flavidus (Lév.) Lücking (2012))
- Trametes flavidinigra Corner (1989)
- Trametes frustrata Corner (1989)
- Trametes fuligineicana Corner (1989)
- Trametes fulvidochmia Corner (1989)

== G ==
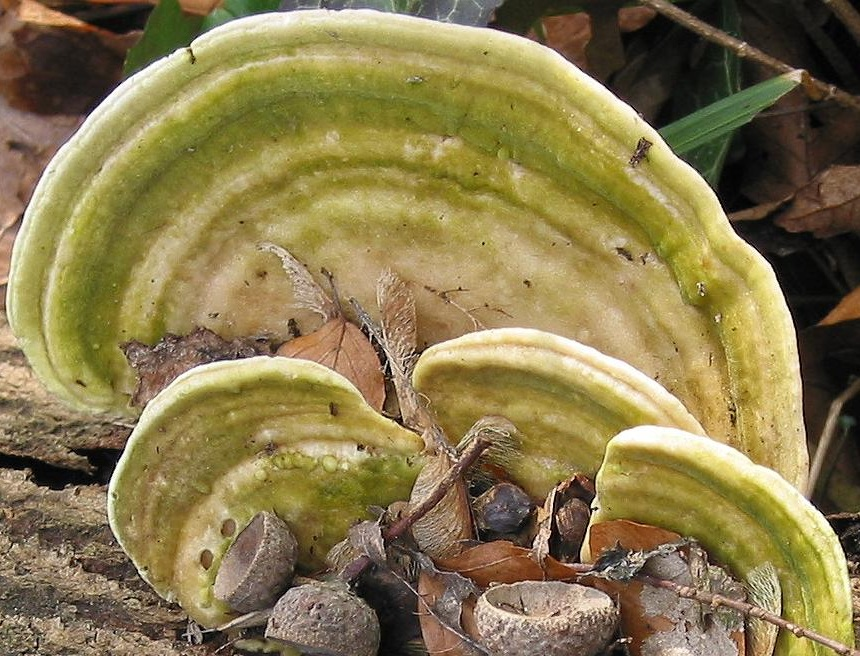
Trametes gibbosa

- Trametes galzinii (Bres.) Pilát (1940)
- Trametes gibbosa (Pers.) Fr. (1838) – Europe
- Trametes gilvoides Lloyd (1916)
- Trametes gilvoumbrina Bres. (1920)
- Trametes glabrata (Lloyd) Ryvarden (1992)
- Trametes glabrorigens (Lloyd) Zmitr., Wasser & Ezhov (2012)
- Trametes globospora Ryvarden & Aime (2009)
- Trametes granulifera Corner (1989)
- Trametes griseolilacina Van der Byl (1922)
- Trametes griseoporus Lázaro Ibiza (1917)
- Trametes guatemalensis Lloyd (1920)

== H ==
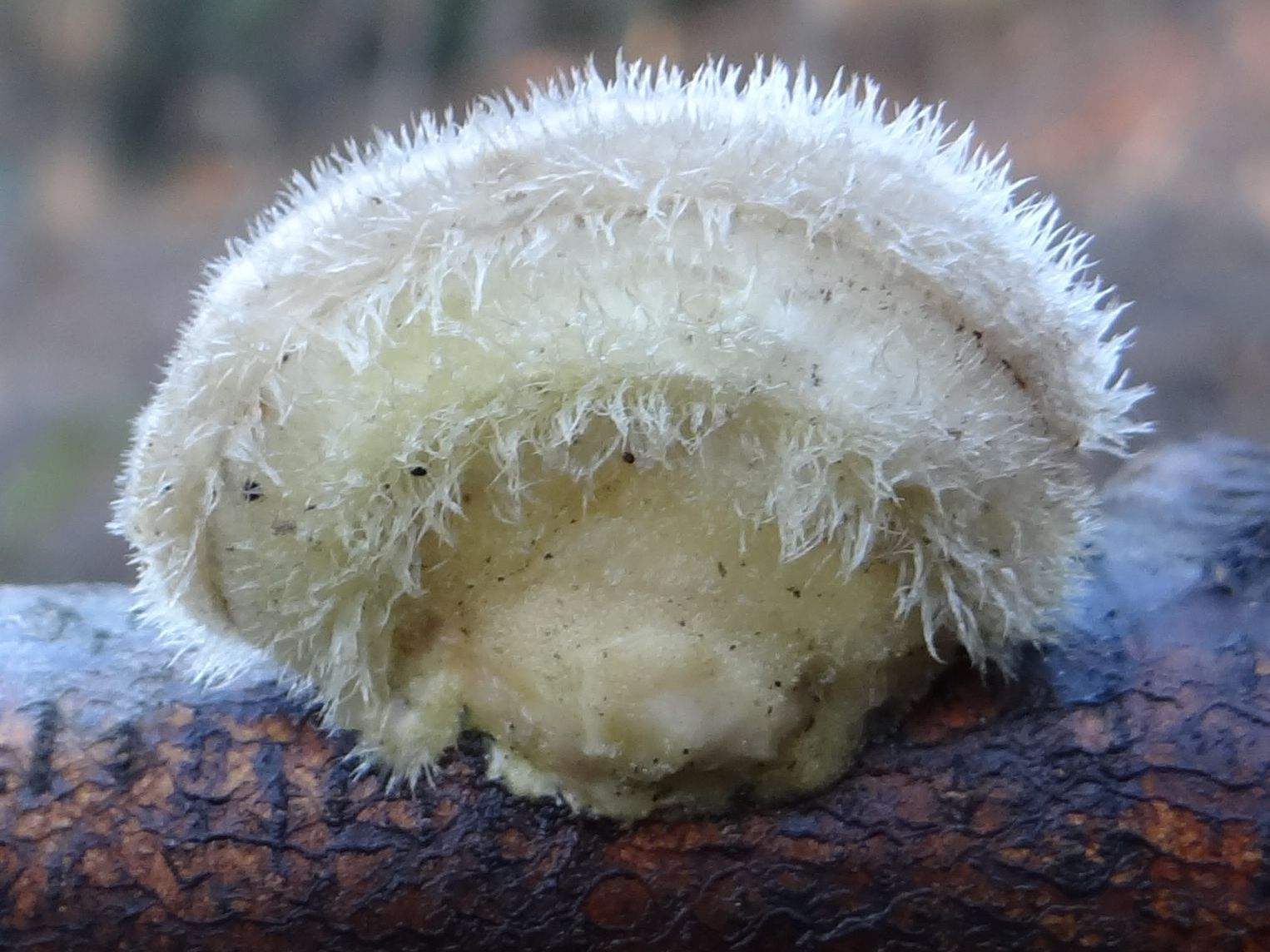
Trametes hirsuta

- Trametes havannensis (Berk. & M.A.Curtis) Murrill (1907)
- Trametes hirsuta (Wulfen) Lloyd (1924) – widespread
- Trametes hirta (P.Beauv.) Zmitr., Wasser & Ezhov (2012)
- Trametes hispidans Berk. ex G.Cunn. (1965)
- Trametes hololeuca (Kalchbr.) G.Cunn. (1949)
- Trametes hostmannii (Berk.) Zmitr., Wasser & Ezhov (2012)
- Trametes hunteri (Lloyd) Ryvarden (1972) – Sierra Leone

== I ==
- Trametes imbricata Ryvarden (2013)
- Trametes indica Virdi (1991)

== J ==
- Trametes jejuna Corner (1989)
- Trametes junipericola Manjón, G.Moreno & Ryvarden (1984) – Spain

== K ==
- Trametes karii Bose (1922)
- Trametes krekei Lloyd (1919)
- Trametes kusanoana Imazeki (1943)
- Trametes kusanoi (Murrill) Sacc. & Trotter (1912)

== L ==
- Trametes lacerata Lloyd (1916)
- Trametes lactinea Berk. (1843)(= Cubamyces lactineus (Berk.) Lücking (2020))
- Trametes lamaoensis Murrill (1907)
- Trametes leonina (Klotzsch) Imazeki (1952) – Africa; Philippines
- Trametes leptaula Speg. (1918)
- Trametes lilacea Bres. (1926)
- Trametes linguiformis Corner (1989)
- Trametes ljubarskyi Pilát (1937) – Europe
- Trametes lunispora Quanten (1996)
- Trametes luridochracea Corner (1989)

== M ==
- Trametes macropora Bres. (1912)
- Trametes manilaensis (Lloyd) Teng (1963)
- Trametes marianna (Pers.) Ryvarden (1973) – Philippines
- Trametes maxima (Mont.) A.David & Rajchenb. (1985) – South America
- Trametes membranacea (Sw.) Kreisel (1971) – Belize; Colombia; Cuba; Jamaica; Puerto Rico; Rio de Janeiro; So Paulo; Trinidad-Tobago
- Trametes merisma Peck (1910)
- Trametes meyenii (Klotzsch) Lloyd (1918) – Ghana; Papua New Guinea; Philippines; Samoa; Seychelles; Sierra Leone; Sudan
- Trametes microporoides Corner (1989)
- Trametes mimetes (Wakef.) Ryvarden (1972) – Malawi; Papua New Guinea
- Trametes minima Berk. (1919)
- Trametes minor Bres. (1920)
- Trametes minutus Læssøe & Ryvarden (2010) – Ecuador
- Trametes modesta (Kunze ex Fr.) Ryvarden (1972) – Bolivia; Philippines; Sierra Leone
- Trametes morganii Lloyd (1919)
- Trametes multiflabellata Corner (1989)

== N ==
- Trametes niam-niamensis (Henn.) Zmitr., Wasser & Ezhov (2012)
- Trametes nigroaspera Lloyd (1924)
- Trametes nigroplebeia Lloyd (1922)
- Trametes nivosa (Berk.) Murrill (1907) – Bolivia; Rio de Janeiro

== O ==
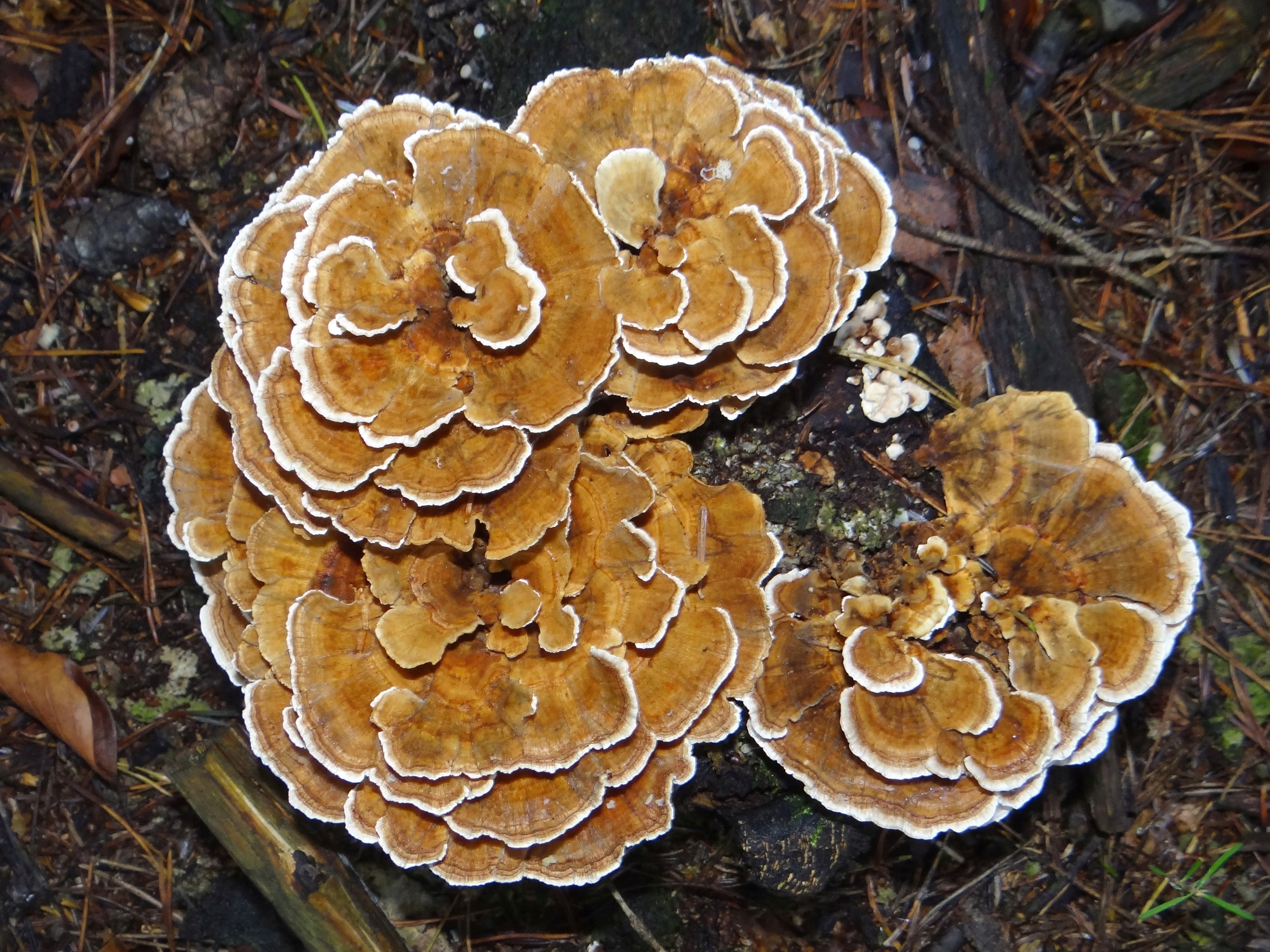
Trametes ochracea

- Trametes obscurata Bres. (1911)
- Trametes obscurotexta Lloyd (1924)
- Trametes obstinatior Corner (1989)
- Trametes ochracea (Pers.) Gilb. & Ryvarden (1987) – Bolivia; France; Germany; Great Britain; Sri Lanka
- Trametes ochroflava Cooke (1880) – Rio de Janeiro
- Trametes olivaceopora Ryvarden & Iturr. (2003) – Venezuela
- Trametes orientalis (Yasuda) Imazeki (1943)
- Trametes ornata (Peck) Pilát (1940)

== P ==
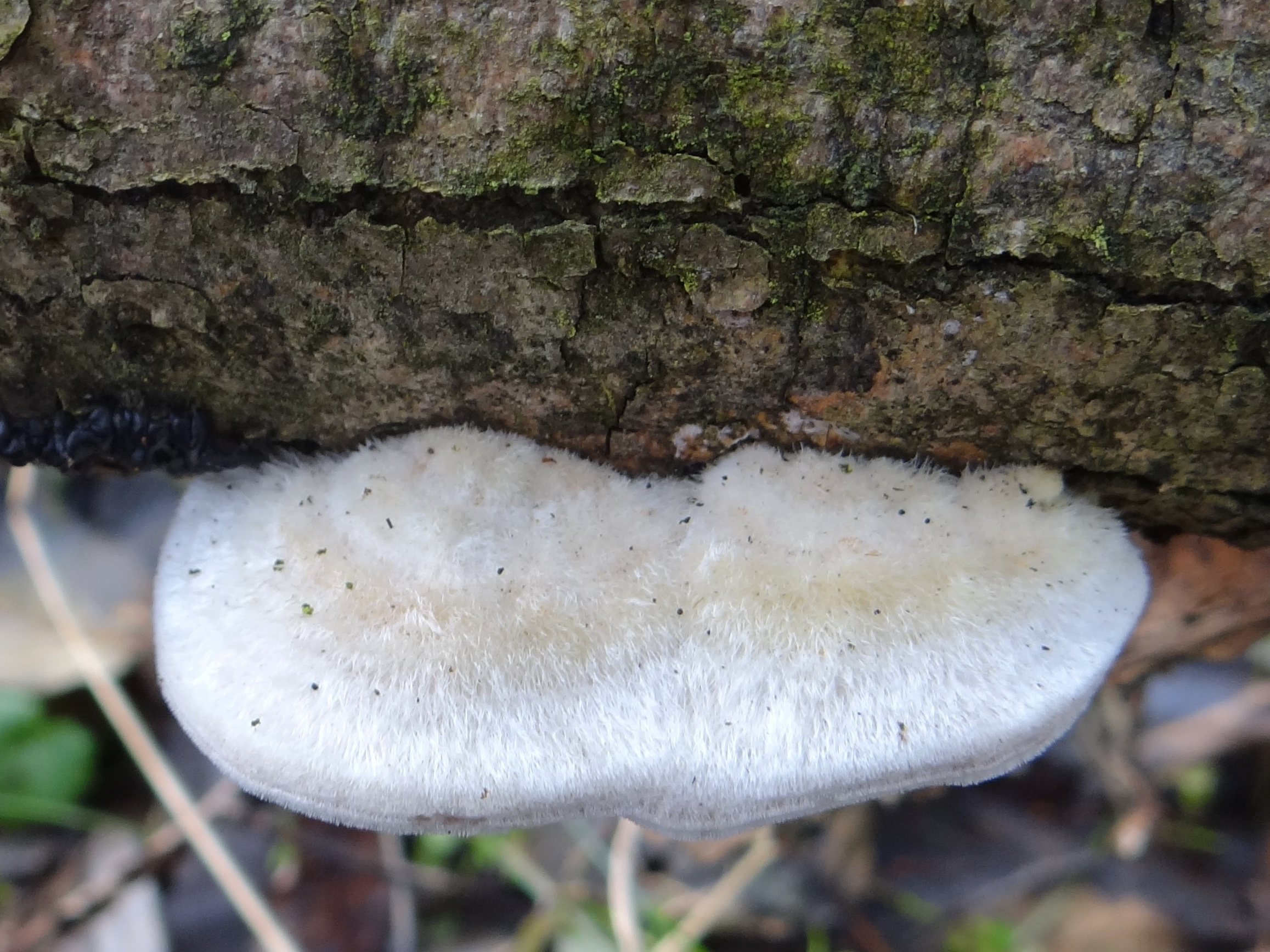
Trametes pubescens

- Trametes palisotii (Fr.) Imazeki (1952) – France; Ghana; Kenya; Mauritius; Nigeria; Philippines; Queensland; Sierra Leone; Togo; Trinidad-Tobago; Zambia
- Trametes pallidilusor Corner (1989)
- Trametes papuasia Corner (1989)
- Trametes paxillosa Corner (1989)
- Trametes pergamena Lloyd (1917)
- Trametes perpallida Corner (1989)
- Trametes philippinensis Lloyd (1924) – Philippines
- Trametes pocas (Berk.) Ryvarden (1984) – Cameroon
- Trametes polyblastes Corner (1989)
- Trametes polyzona (Pers.) Justo (2011)
- Trametes pribramensis Pilát (1927)
- Trametes primulina Corner (1989)
- Trametes propinqua (Speg.) Rick (1960)
- Trametes psila (Lloyd) Ryvarden (2015)
- Trametes pubescens (Schumach.) Pilát (1939) – Austria; Cameroon; Cyprus; Czech Republic; Great Britain; Hong Kong; Italy; Montserrat; New South Wales; New York
- Trametes pusilla Lloyd (1918)

== Q ==
- Trametes quarrei (Beeli) Zmitr., Wasser & Ezhov (2012)
- Trametes quercina Lloyd (1922)

== R ==
- Trametes raduloides (Pilát) Pilát (1940)
- Trametes repanda (Pers.) Justo (2014)
- Trametes rigidiceps Corner (1989)
- Trametes robiniophila Murrill (1907)
- Trametes roseola Pat. & Har. (1900) – Sabah; Sierra Leone
- Trametes roseopora Lloyd (1922)
- Trametes rugosituba Corner (1989)
- Trametes rugosopicta Lloyd (1920)

== S ==
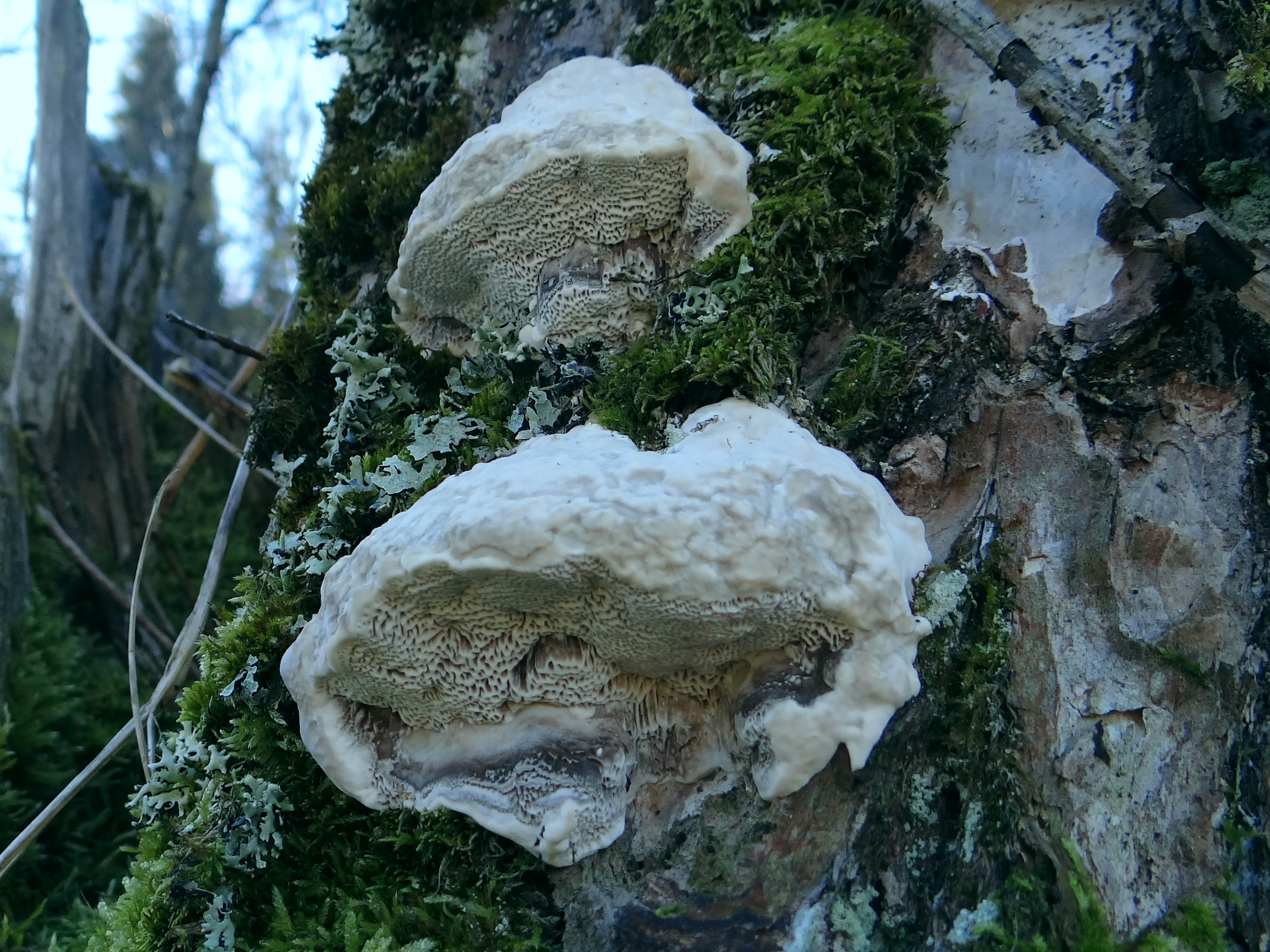
Trametes suaveolens

- Trametes salebrosa Van der Byl (1924) – South Africa
- Trametes salina Corner (1989)
- Trametes salmonea Imazeki (1952)
- Trametes sediliensis Corner (1989)
- Trametes similis Bres. (1912)
- Trametes socotrana Cooke (1882) – Cameroon; Mozambique
- Trametes speciosa (Fr.) Zmitr., Wasser & Ezhov (2012)
- Trametes stowardii Lloyd (1917)
- Trametes strumosa (Fr.) Zmitr., Wasser & Ezhov (2012)
- Trametes stuckertiana (Speg.) Speg. (1909)
- Trametes styracicola Henn. (1902)
- Trametes suaveolens (L.) Fr. (1838) – Europe
- Trametes subalutacea Bourdot & Galzin (1925) – Europe
- Trametes subectypa (Murrill) Gilb. & Ryvarden (1987)
- Trametes subincana Corner (1989)
- Trametes sublutea Corner (1989)
- Trametes subminima Lloyd (1920)
- Trametes subocellata Lloyd (1924)
- Trametes subserpens Murrill (1920)
- Trametes substrata Corner (1989)
- Trametes subsuaveolens B.K.Cui & Y.C.Dai (2007) – China
- Trametes sultan-ahmadii Corner (1989)
- Trametes supermodesta Ryvarden & Iturr. (2003) – Roraima
- Trametes symploci Yasuda (1923)

== T ==
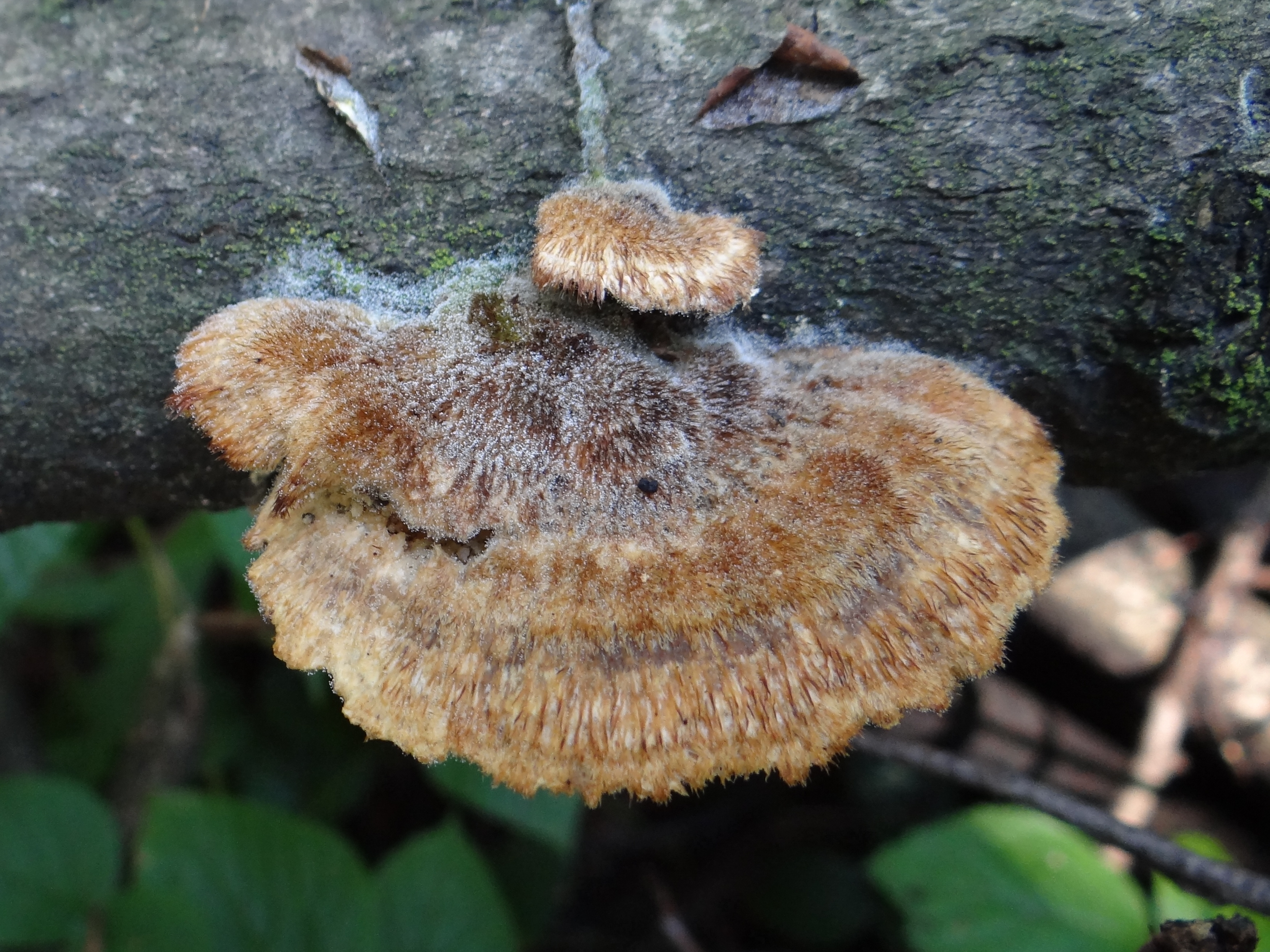
Trametes trogii

- Trametes tenacipora Corner (1989)
- Trametes tenuirosea Lloyd (1923)
- Trametes tenuis (Berk.) Justo (2014)
- Trametes tephroleuca Berk. (1854)
- Trametes textulaminata Corner (1989)
- Trametes theae Zimm. (1901)
- Trametes trogii Berk. (1850) – Europe
- Trametes truncatispora Yasuda (1919)
- Trametes tuberculata Bres. (1912)
- Trametes turpis Corner (1989)
- Trametes tyromycoides Ryvarden (2000)

== U ==
- Trametes unguliformis (Murrill) Ryvarden (1985)

== V ==
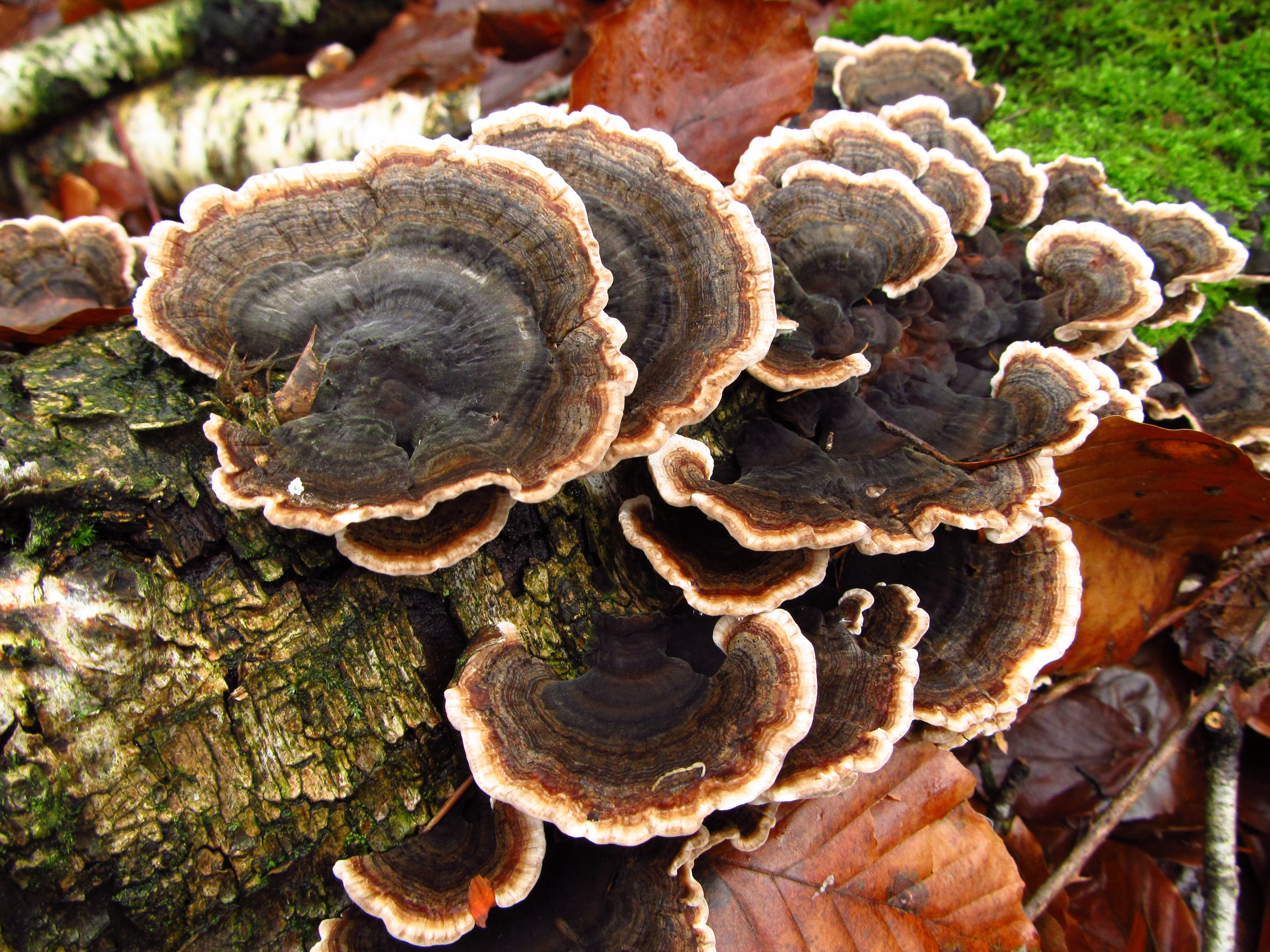
Trametes versicolor

- Trametes varians Van der Byl (1922)
- Trametes variegata (Berk.) Zmitr., Wasser & Ezhov (2012)
- Trametes vernicipes (Berk.) Zmitr., Wasser & Ezhov (2012)
- Trametes versicolor (L.) Lloyd (1921) – widespread
- Trametes verticalis Corner (1989)
- Trametes vespacea (Pers.) Zmitr., Wasser & Ezhov (2012)
- Trametes villosa (Sw.) Kreisel (1971) – Cayman Is.; Colombia; Cuba; Dominican Republic; Guatemala; Jamaica; Mauritius; Puerto Rico; Rio de Janeiro; St.Lucia; Trinidad-Tobago
- Trametes violacea Lloyd (1915)
- Trametes vitrea Lloyd (1919)

== W ==
- Trametes williamsii Murrill (1907)

== X ==
- Trametes xanthopodoides Corner (1989)
