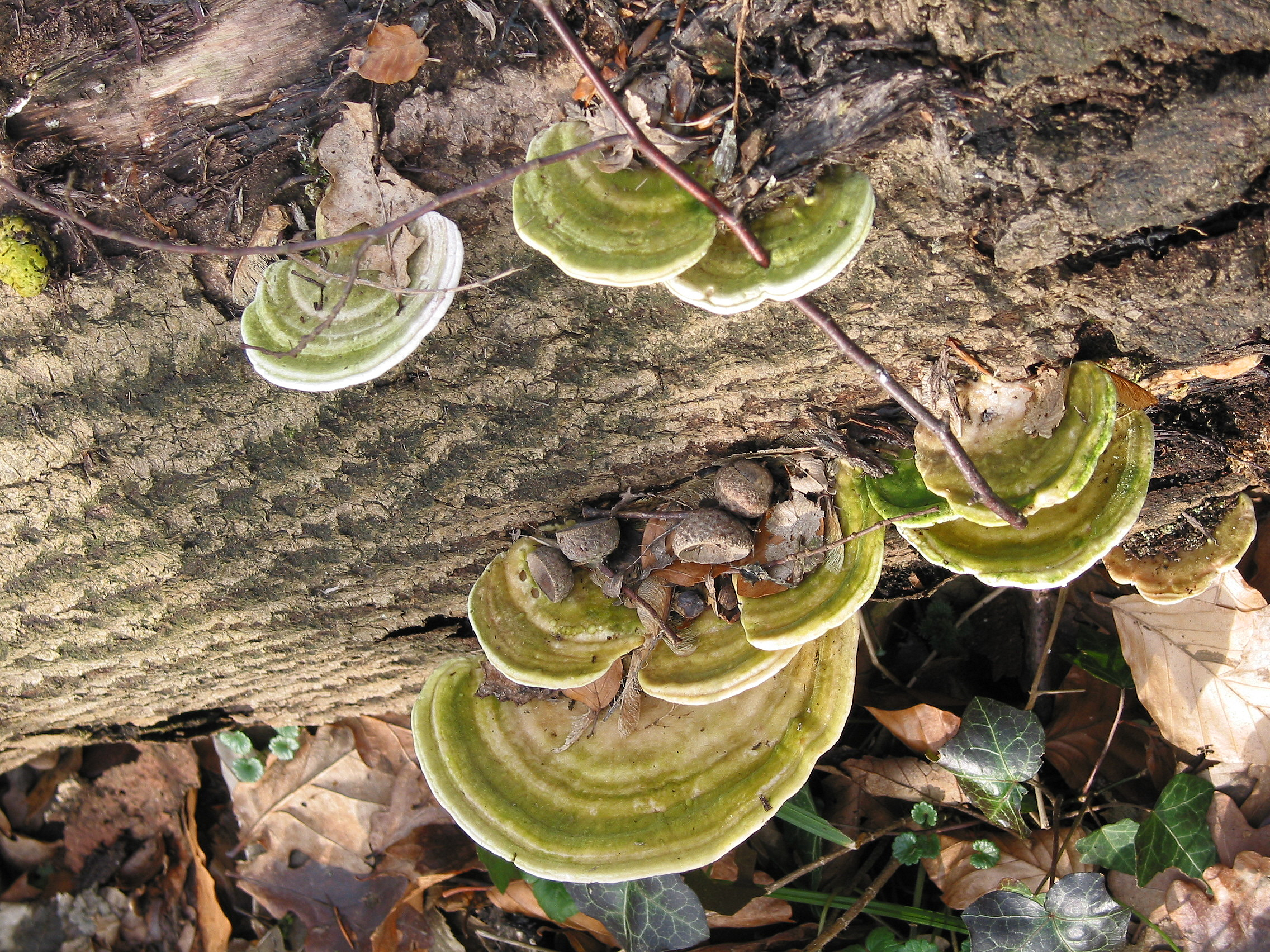

Scientific classification
- Kingdom: Fungi
- Division: Basidiomycota
- Class: Agaricomycetes
- Order: Polyporales
- Family: Polyporaceae
- Genus: Trametes
- Species: T. gibbosa

Binomial name
- Trametes gibbosa (Pers.) Fr. (1836)

Synonyms
- Agarico-suber scalptum Paulet 1793; Bulliardia virescens Lázaro Ibiza 1916; Daedalea gibbosa (Pers.) Pers. 1801; Daedalea virescens (Lázaro Ibiza) Sacc. & Trotter 1925; Lenzites gibbosa (Pers.) Hemmi 1939; Merulius gibbosus Pers. 1795; Polyporus gibbosus (Pers.) P. Kumm. 1871; Polystictus kalchbrenneri (Fr.) Cooke 1886; Pseudotrametes gibbosa (Pers.) Bondartsev & Singer 1944; Pseudotrametes gibbosa forma tenuis (Pilát) anon. ined. Trametes crenulata Berk. 1854; Trametes gibbosa var. tenuis (Pilát) anon. ined. Trametes gibbosa forma tenuis Pilát 1940; Trametes kalchbrenneri Fr. 1868; Trametes nigrescens Lázaro Ibiza 1916

= Trametes gibbosa =

Species of mushroom

Trametes gibbosa
- Mycological characteristics
- Pores on hymenium
- Cap is offset
- Hymenium is decurrent
- Lacks a stipe
- Spore print is white to cream
- Ecology is saprotrophic
- Edibility is inedible

Trametes gibbosa, commonly known as the lumpy bracket, is a polypore mushroom that causes white rot. It is found on beech stumps and the dead wood of other hardwood species. Fruit bodies are 8–15 cm in diameter and semicircular in shape. The upper surface is usually gray or white, but may be greenish in older specimens due to algal growth. Elongated pores are located on the under-surface. The fruiting bodies are frequently attacked by boring beetle larvae.

== Description ==
Trametes gibbosa grows as a shelf mushroom and can reach sizes of up to 20 cm wide. As the common name suggests, the upper surface is lumpy/uneven and velvety. Sometimes magnification may be needed to see the hairs. This upper surface is white/creamy when young, but often develops greyer tints as well as green from algae settling into the hairs. The pore surface is of similar white and cream colors, also developing grayer tints in age. There are about 1–3 pores per mm that are elongated and can sometimes look maze-like or even gill-like in atypical specimens.

The flesh is woody and has no distinct taste.

The spore print, which may be hard to obtain, is white. The spores are 4–5.5 x 2–2.5 μm, elliptic to cylindrical, smooth, hyaline, and inamyloid. The hyphal system is trimitic, with clamp connections.

=== Similar species ===
The genus Trametes can be separated from other polypores by the hairy and lumpy caps, the fan to kidney shape, the elongated pores, and their relative thinness. Some Trametes (especially Trametes versicolor, the turkey tail) can look similar to certain Stereums, but a specimen of Stereum will never have pores on the undersurface, instead they are smooth underneath.

Trametes aesculi is quite similar, but the pores are more variably circular or maze-like rather than mostly elongated. Additionally T. aesculi loses its tomentose upper surface on maturity and becomes smooth. Confusion between the two species can be settled under a microscope: the spores of T. aesculi has bigger spores, 5–7 μm in length.

Trametes elegans is similar but is not found in North America or Europe.

Whitish or grey specimens of Trametes lactinea can seem similar, but will have round or angular pores, rather than elongated.

== Distribution and habitat ==
T. gibbosa is saprobic on dead hardwoods and is known from Eurasia and North America, in the Pacific Northwest and east of the Great Plains.

It grows year round.

== See also ==
- List of Trametes species
