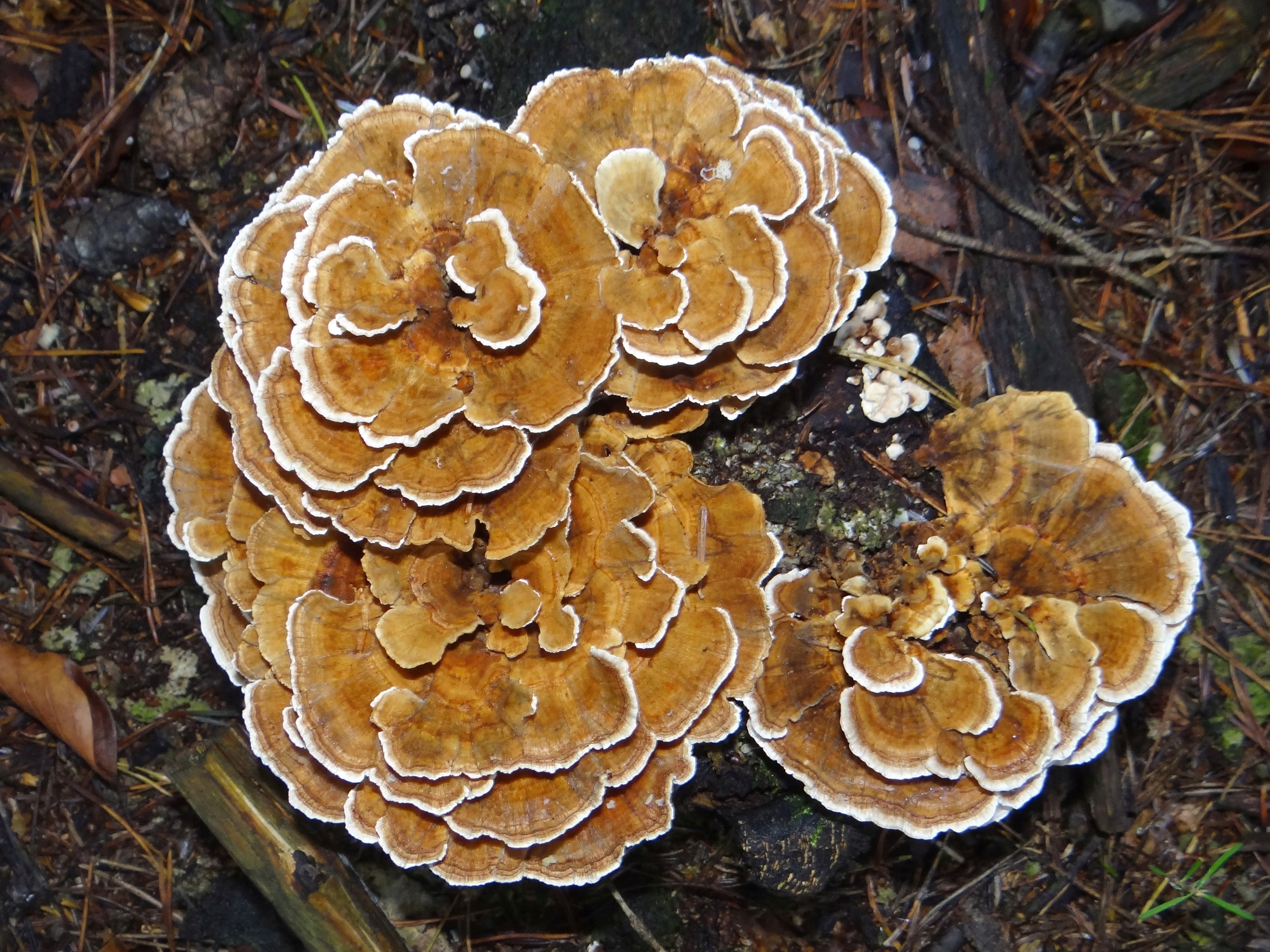

Scientific classification
- Kingdom: Fungi
- Division: Basidiomycota
- Class: Agaricomycetes
- Order: Polyporales
- Family: Polyporaceae
- Genus: Trametes
- Species: T. ochracea

Binomial name
- Trametes ochracea (Pers.) Gilb. & Ryvarden, 1987

= Trametes ochracea =

Species of mushroom

Trametes ochracea is a common polypore mushroom native to North America and Europe, although rarer than some other Trametes species. It is a related species to, and is a lookalike of the pale variety of Trametes versicolor. Like T. versicolor, it is commonly called turkey tail, and other common names are ochre bracket and ochre trametes.

T. ochracea is a close relative of the more famous T. versicolor, so research into its medicinal value is limited yet occurring, and it is likely it is of similar medicinal value.

== Etymology ==
The specific epithet ochracea, meaning 'ochre', refers to the orange, brown, and ochre colors of T. ochracea.

== Description ==
Trametes ochracea
- Mycological characteristics
- Pores on hymenium
- Cap is offset
- Hymenium is decurrent
- Lacks a stipe
- Spore print is white
- Ecology is saprotrophic
- Edibility is too hard to eat

The fruiting body is shaped similar to Trametes versicolor, having a rounded, shelf-like fruiting body that can have a wavy edge. It has no discernable stalk, and the tough flesh is 1–3 mm (0.04–0.12 in) thick, and can be up to 5 mm (0.20 in) thick at the point of attachment. The flat cap may be up to 10 cm (3.9 in) across. It has zones of fine hairs, colored ochre-yellow or orange. Unlike Trametes versicolor, there is no black layer underneath the tomentum that sits above the whitish flesh. The pore layer is creamy ochre.

=== Similar species ===
Trametes versicolor, as described above, is a closely related species to T. ochracea, and can be easily confused for the latter when looking at a pale variety, however in general it is usually darker and has smaller pores and spores. T. suvaeolens is a much paler relative, and is much less densely overlapping tiers. Several corticoid (crust-like) fungi (including Stereum) can grow as similarly zoned fruit bodies, however they have smooth hymenium, not pores.

== Ecology ==
Trametes ochracea is a white rot fungus that mainly grows in the wild on beech and oak wood. It degrades lignin from lignincellulosic materials, such as wood and wood products, and is therefore able to be cultivated.

This species is likely eaten by similar or the same insects that eat T. versicolor, such as fungus moths, gnats, and the maggots of mushroom flies.

== Uses ==
Although its leathery texture rendering it inedible, and medicinal value is pending, a methanol extract of T. ochraceus showed anti-inflammitory effects and was also shown to inhibit heat-induced hemolysis in red blood cells (erythrocytes). Certain strains have been observed to release pectinase, an enzyme that breaks down pectin.

== Gallery ==
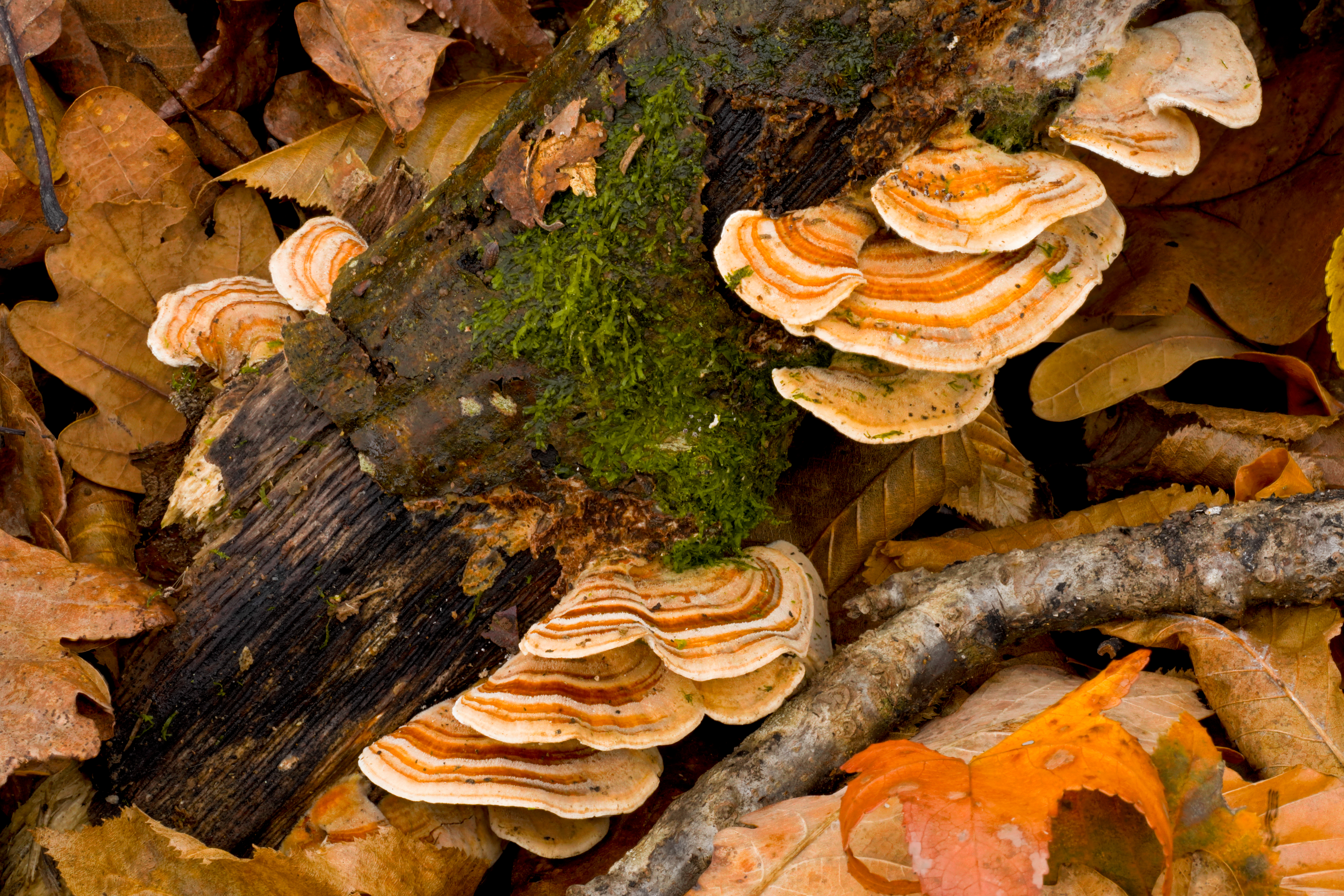
A cluster with clearly defined growth rings.

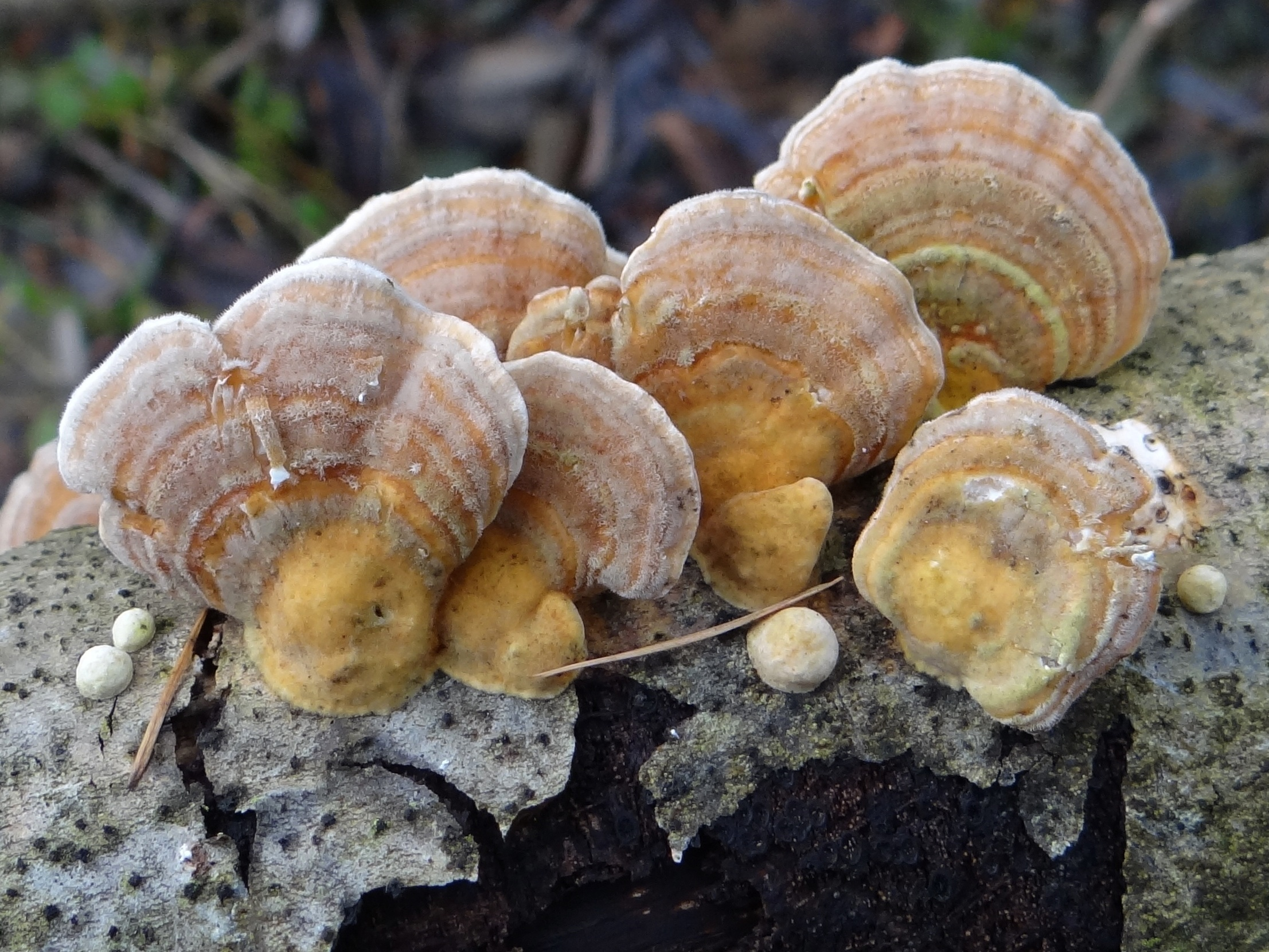
A smaller cluster with more indistinct growth rings.

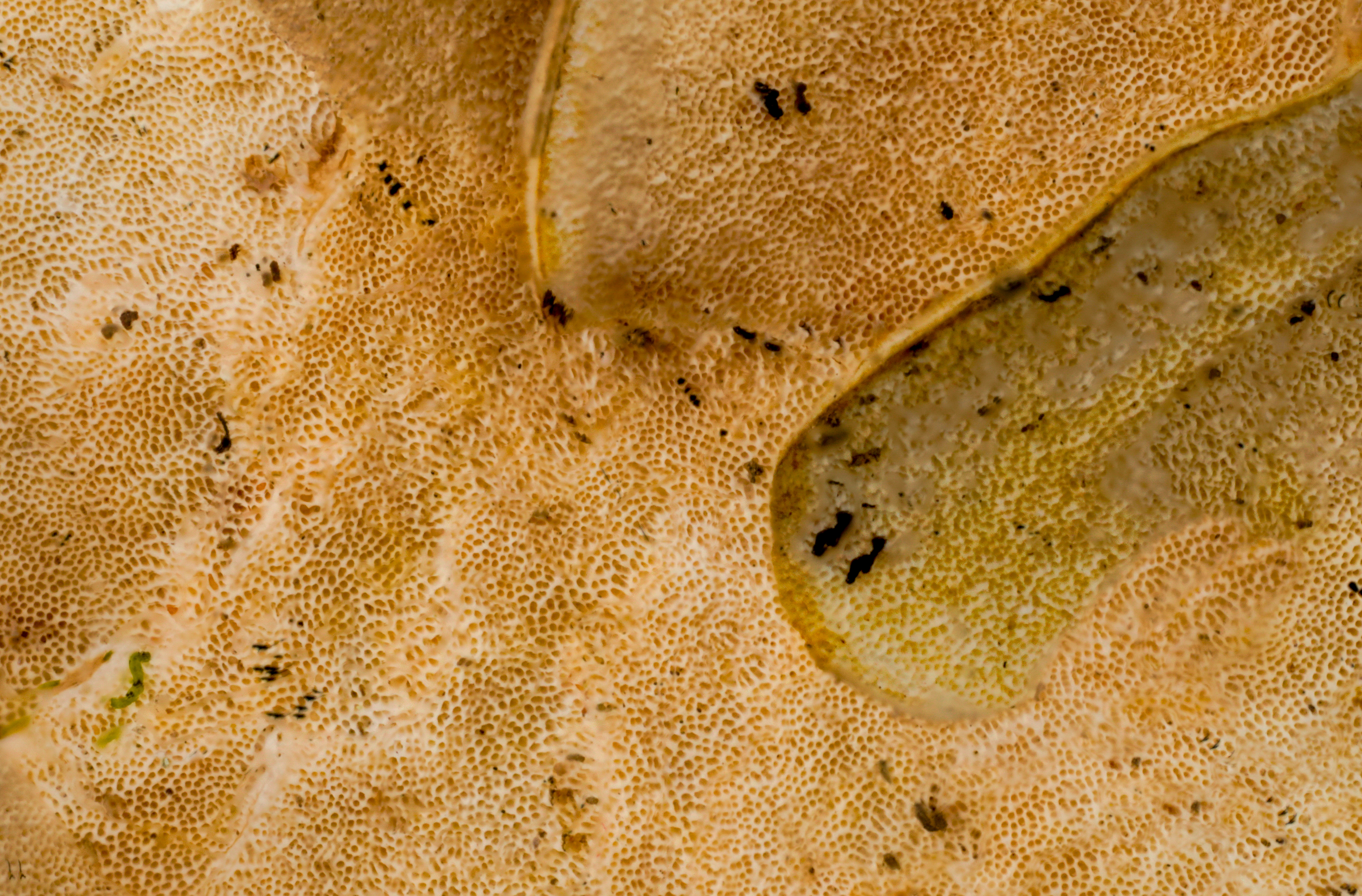
Pore surface with faint staining

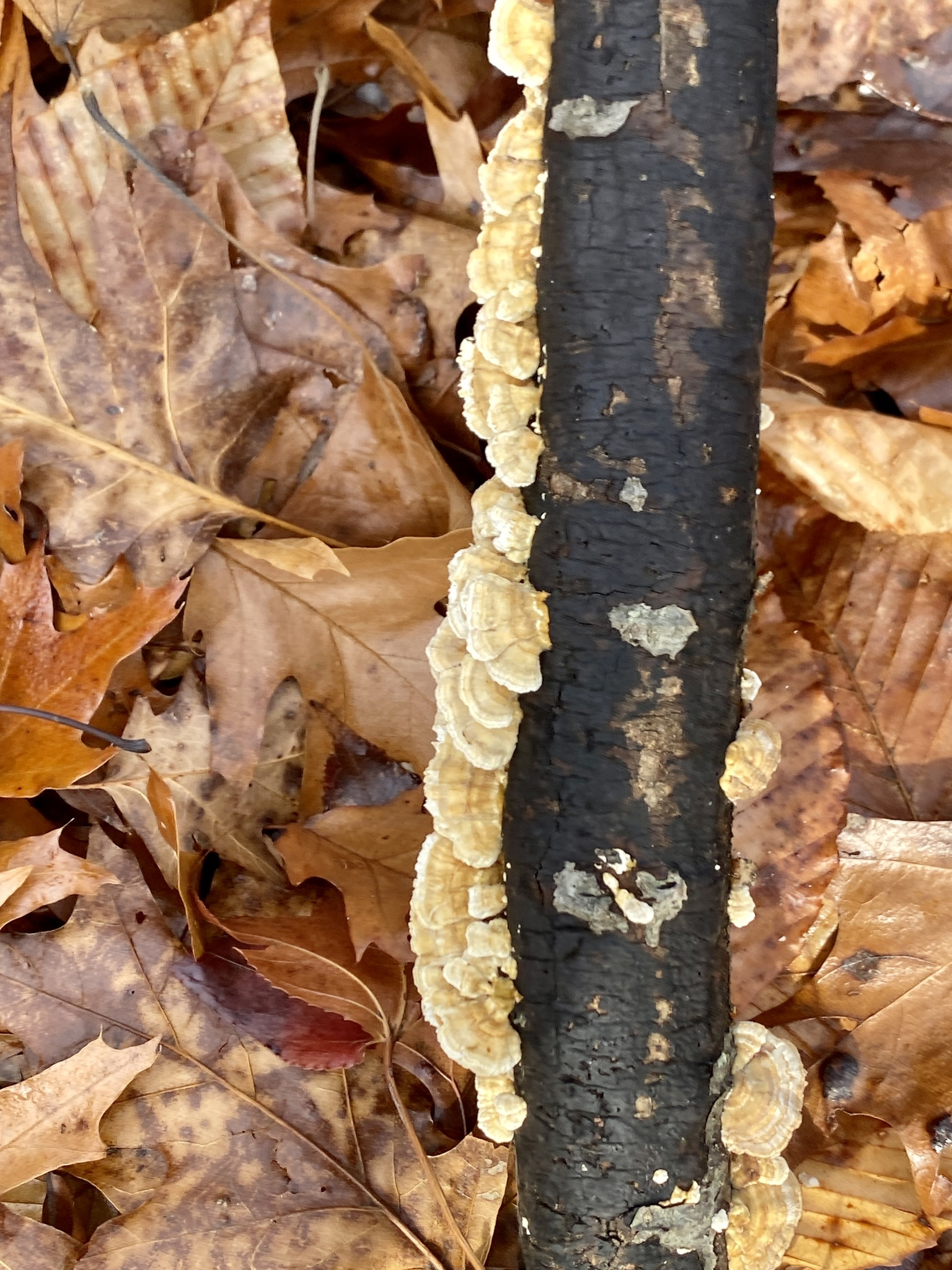
A very creamy-colored group of brackets.

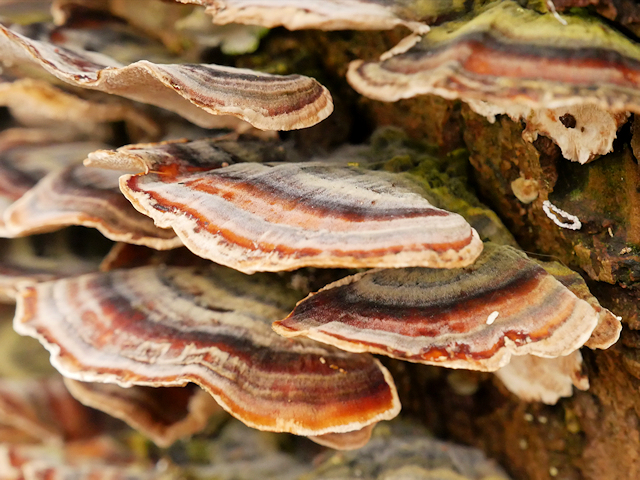
These fruiting bodies of T. versicolor display similar colors to T. ochraceus, showing their affinity to be confused.
