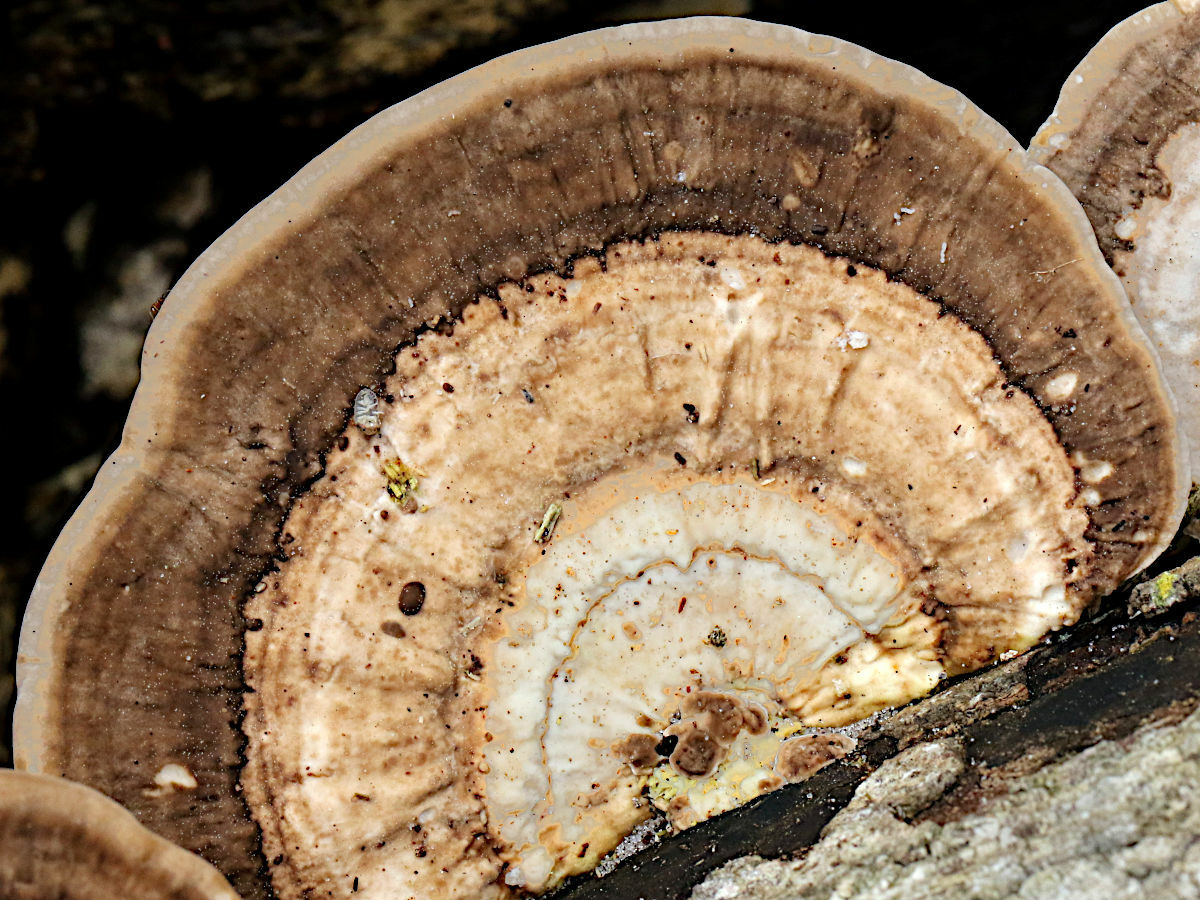
- upperside
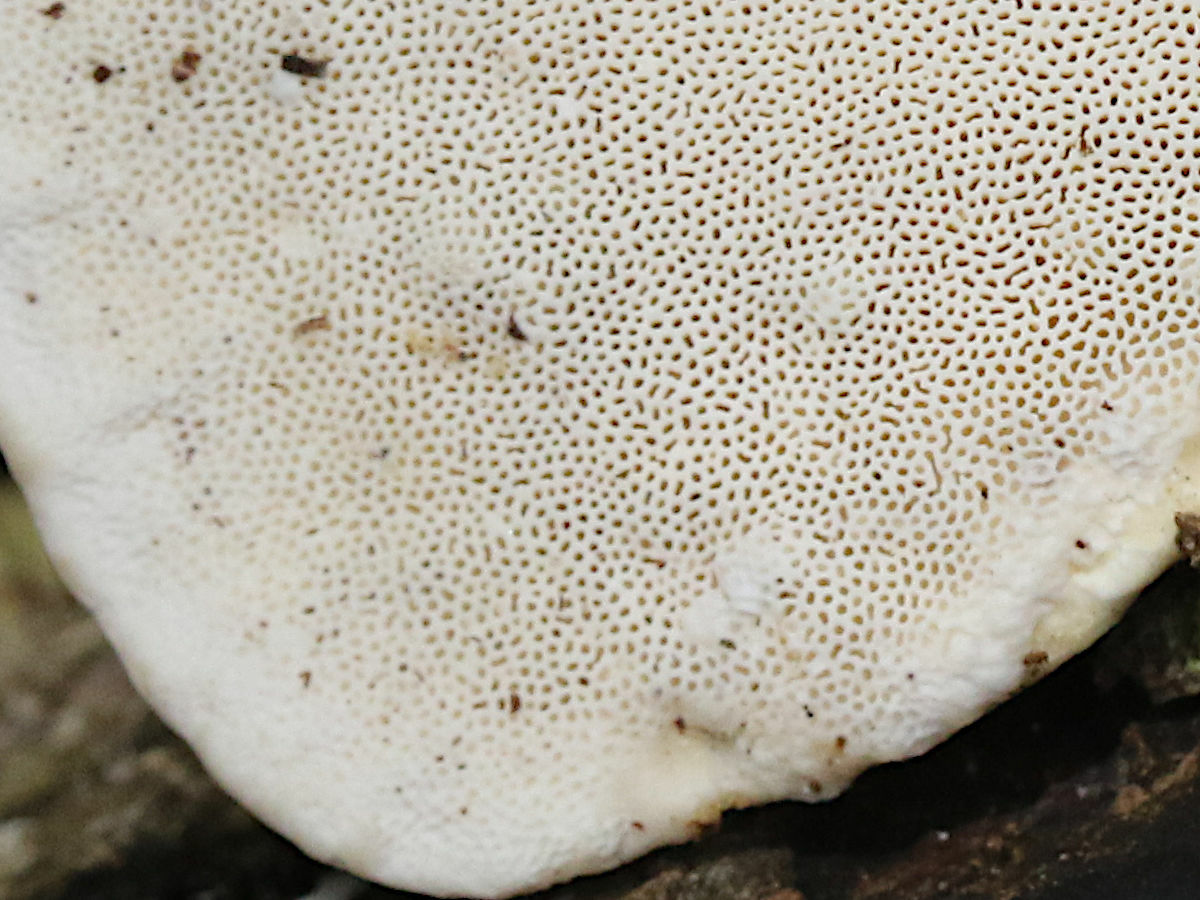
- underside

Scientific classification
- Kingdom: Fungi
- Division: Basidiomycota
- Class: Agaricomycetes
- Order: Polyporales
- Family: Polyporaceae
- Genus: Trametes
- Species: T. lactinea

Binomial name
- Trametes lactinea Berk. (1843)

= Trametes lactinea =

Species of mushroom

Trametes lactinea, commonly known as latte bracket, is a polypore wood-decay fungus that can cause white rot. It is distributed throughout the world. The species was first described by English cryptogamist Miles Joseph Berkeley in 1843.

== See also ==
- List of Trametes species
