= Trametes africana =

Scientific classification
- Domain: Eukaryota
- Kingdom: Fungi
- Division: Basidiomycota
- Class: Agaricomycetes
- Order: Polyporales
- Family: Polyporaceae
- Genus: Trametes
- Species: T. africana

Binomial name
- Trametes africana Ryvarden (2004)

Species of fungus

Trametes africana is a poroid bracket fungus in the family Polyporaceae. It was described as new to science in 2004 by Norwegian mycologist Leif Ryvarden. It is found in Africa, where it has been recorded from Cameroon, Ethiopia, Kenya, Rwanda and Uganda. The fungus is characterized by its perennial habit and hard woody fruit bodies that become reddish to bay in colour with a waxy surface texture around the base. The pore surface and context are brownish to yellowish. Spores made by the fungus are cylindrical, hyaline, and thin-walled, measuring 5–8 by 2.5–3.3 μm.

== See also ==
- List of Trametes species
