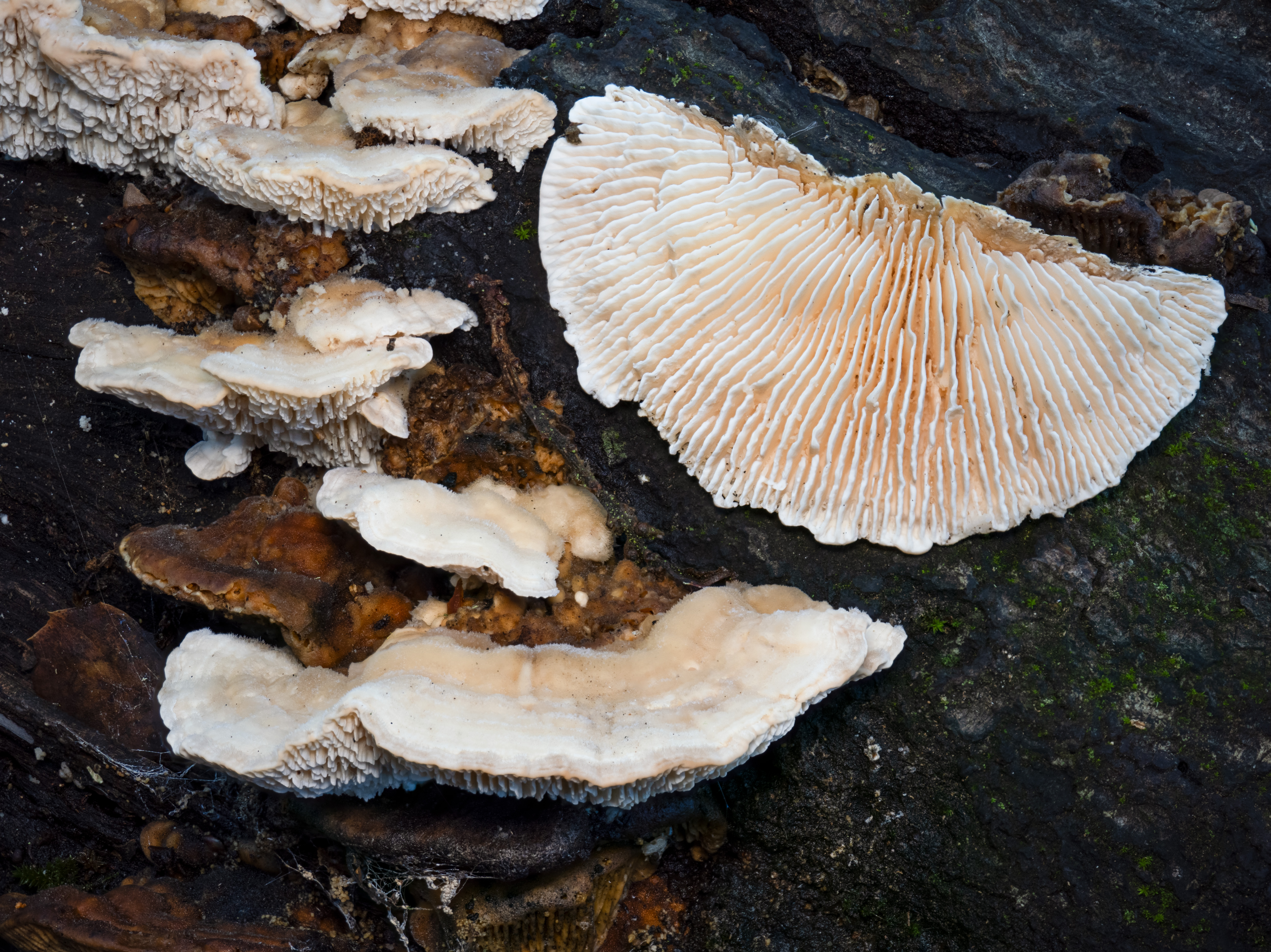

Scientific classification
- Kingdom: Fungi
- Division: Basidiomycota
- Class: Agaricomycetes
- Order: Polyporales
- Family: Polyporaceae
- Genus: Trametes
- Species: T. betulina

Binomial name
- Trametes betulina (L.) Pilát (1939)

Synonyms
- Lenzites betulina (L.) Fr., (1838)

= Trametes betulina =

Species of fungus

Trametes betulina
- Mycological characteristics
- Gills on hymenium
- Cap is flat
- Hymenium attachment is irregular or not applicable
- Lacks a stipe
- Spore print is white
- Ecology is saprotrophic
- Edibility is inedible

Trametes betulina (formerly Lenzites betulina), sometimes known by common names gilled polypore, birch mazegill or multicolor gill polypore, is a species of fungus.

The caps are 2.5–13 centimetres (1–5 in) wide. Although it is a member of the Polyporales order, the fruiting bodies have gills instead of pores, which distinguishes it from the superficially similar Trametes versicolor or T. hirsuta.

It is inedible due to its toughness. Research has shown that it has several medicinal properties, including antioxidant, antimicrobial, antitumor, and immunosuppressive activities.
