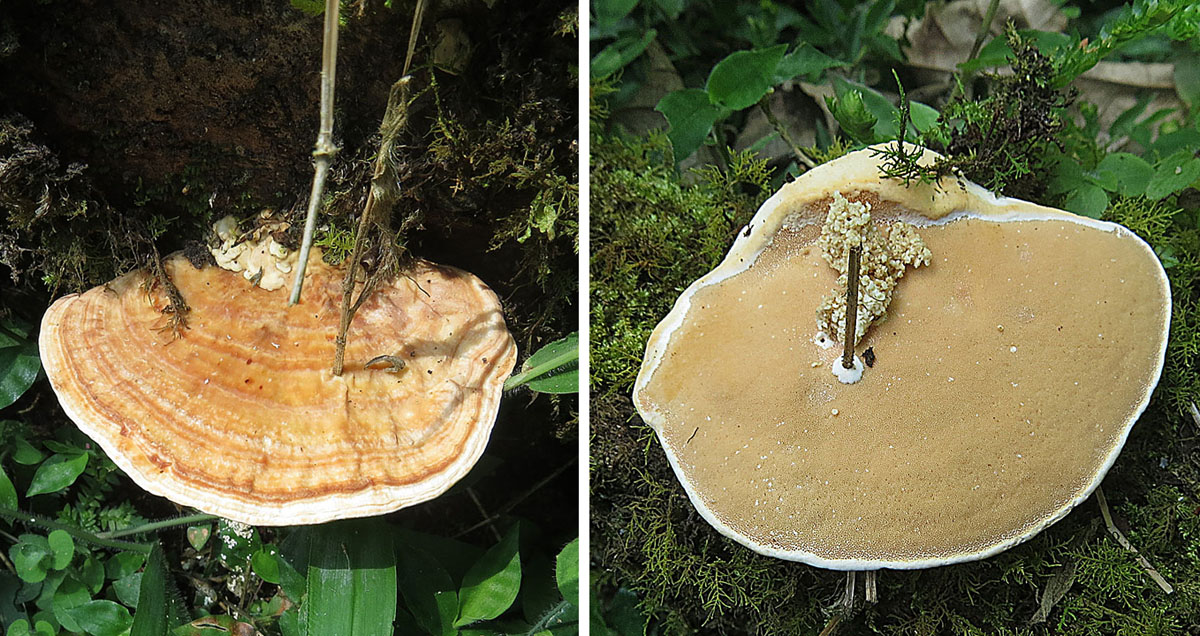

Scientific classification
- Domain: Eukaryota
- Kingdom: Fungi
- Division: Basidiomycota
- Class: Agaricomycetes
- Order: Polyporales
- Family: Polyporaceae
- Genus: Trametes
- Species: T. cubensis

Binomial name
- Trametes cubensis (Mont.) Sacc. (1891)

Synonyms
- Polyporus cubensis Mont. (1837); Polyporus ostreatus Lév. (1846); Ungulina cubensis (Mont.) Pat. (1900); Cubamyces cubensis (Mont.) Murrill (1905); Trametes subcubensis Murrill (1939); Lenzites cubamyces Teixeira (1992)

= Trametes cubensis =

Species of fungus

Trametes cubensis is a poroid bracket fungus in the family Polyporaceae. It was first described in 1837 as Polyporus cubensis by Camille Montagne. Pier Andrea Saccardo transferred it to the genus Trametes in 1891.
