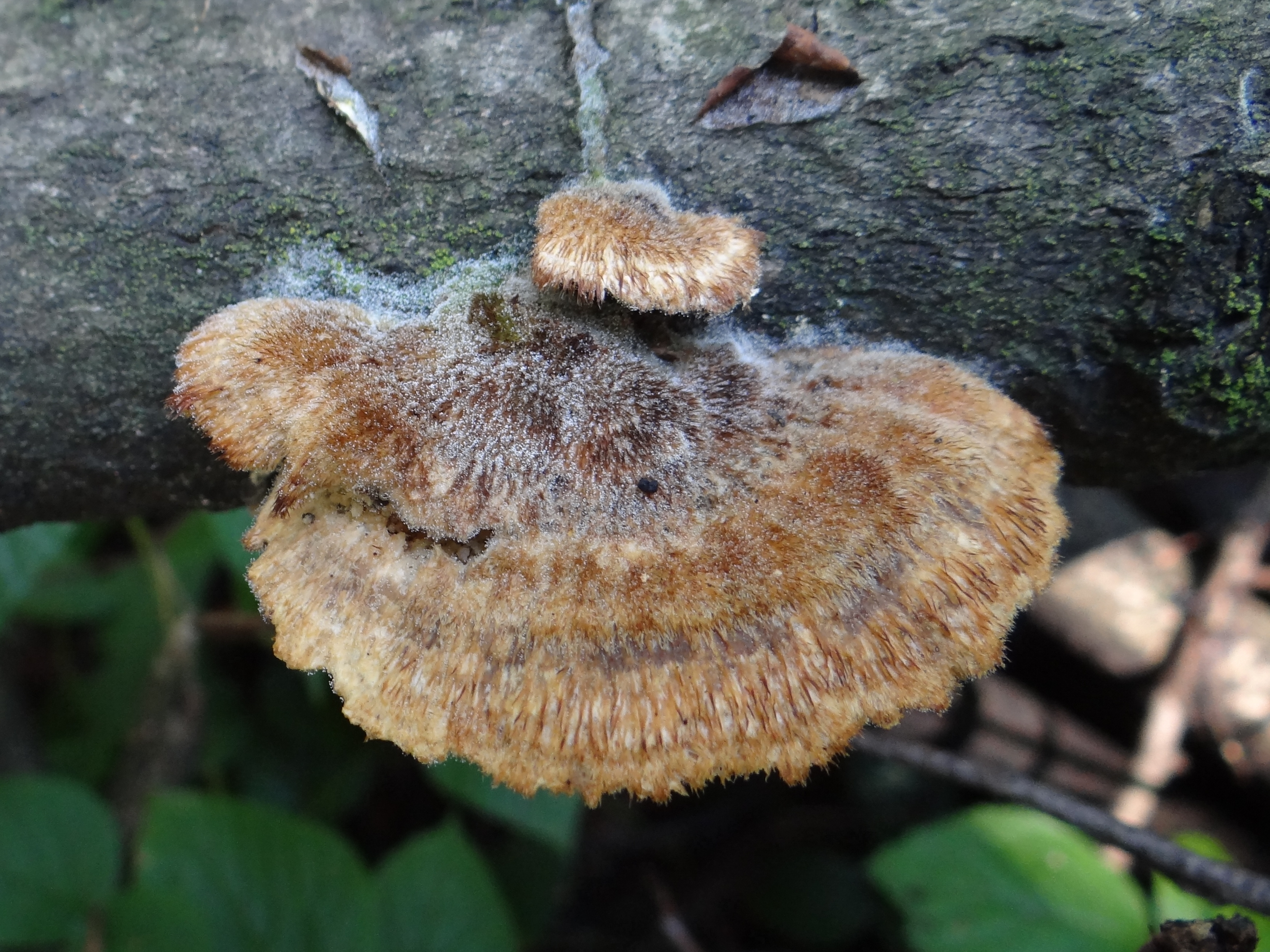

Scientific classification
- Domain: Eukaryota
- Kingdom: Fungi
- Division: Basidiomycota
- Class: Agaricomycetes
- Order: Polyporales
- Family: Polyporaceae
- Genus: Trametes
- Species: T. trogii

Binomial name
- Trametes trogii Berk.

= Trametes trogii =

Species of fungus

Trametes trogii is a species of fungus belonging to the family Polyporaceae.

It has almost cosmopolitan distribution.

Synonym:

- Funalia trogii (Berk.) Bondartsev & Singer, 1941
