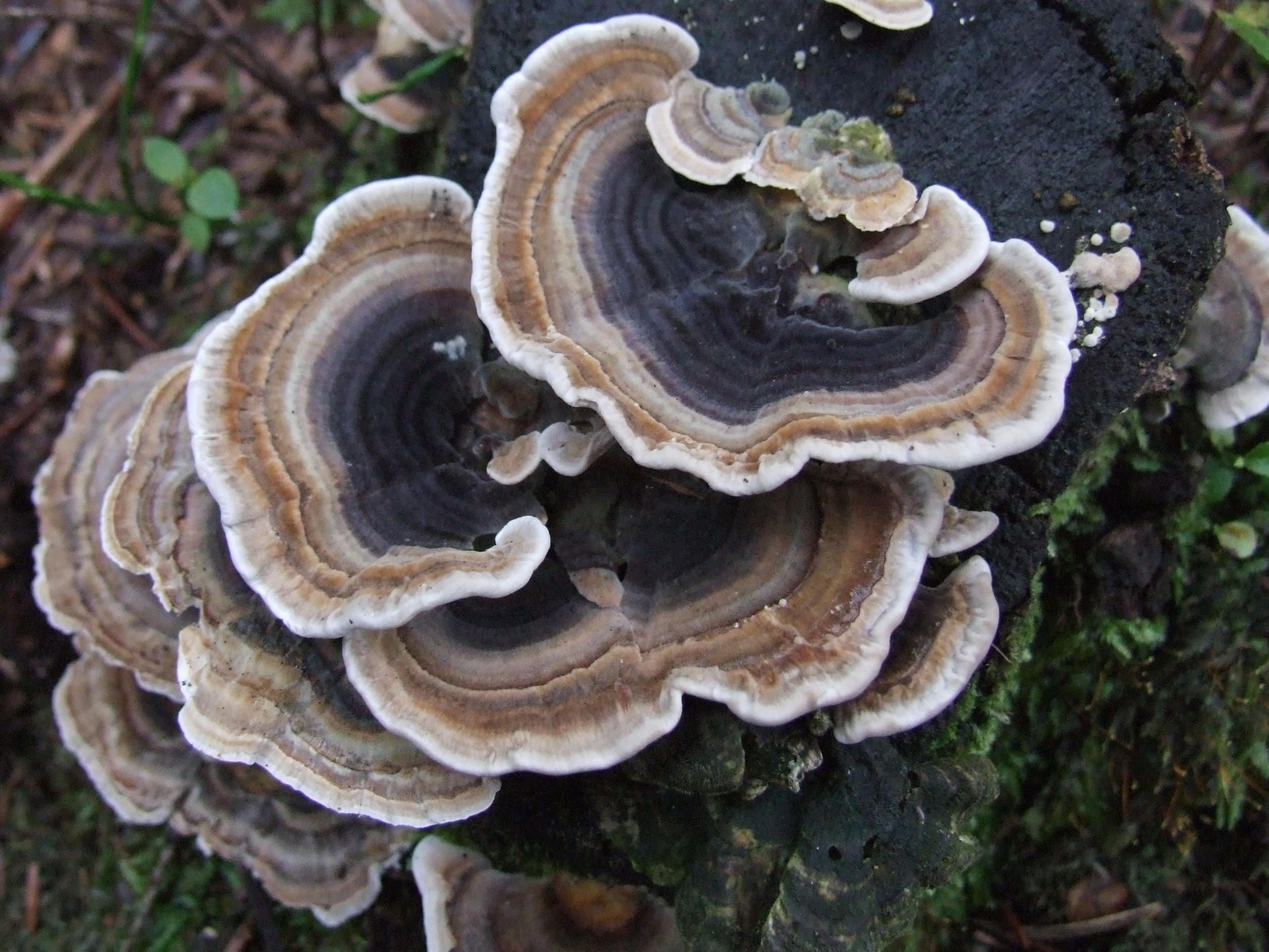

Scientific classification
- Kingdom: Fungi
- Division: Basidiomycota
- Class: Agaricomycetes
- Order: Polyporales
- Family: Polyporaceae
- Genus: Trametes
- Species: T. versicolor

Binomial name
- Trametes versicolor (L.) Lloyd (1920)

Synonyms
- Boletus versicolor L. (1753); Polyporus versicolor (L.) Fr. (1821); Coriolus versicolor (L.) Quél. (1886)

= Trametes versicolor =

Species of mushroom

Trametes versicolor
- Mycological characteristics
- Pores on hymenium
- Cap is offset or indistinct
- Hymenium is decurrent
- Lacks a stipe
- Spore print is white to yellow
- Ecology is saprotrophic
- Edibility is too hard to eat

Trametes versicolor – also known as Coriolus versicolor and Polyporus versicolor – is a common polypore mushroom found throughout the world. Because its shape is similar to that of a wild turkey's tail feathers when spread, T. versicolor is most commonly referred to as turkey tail.

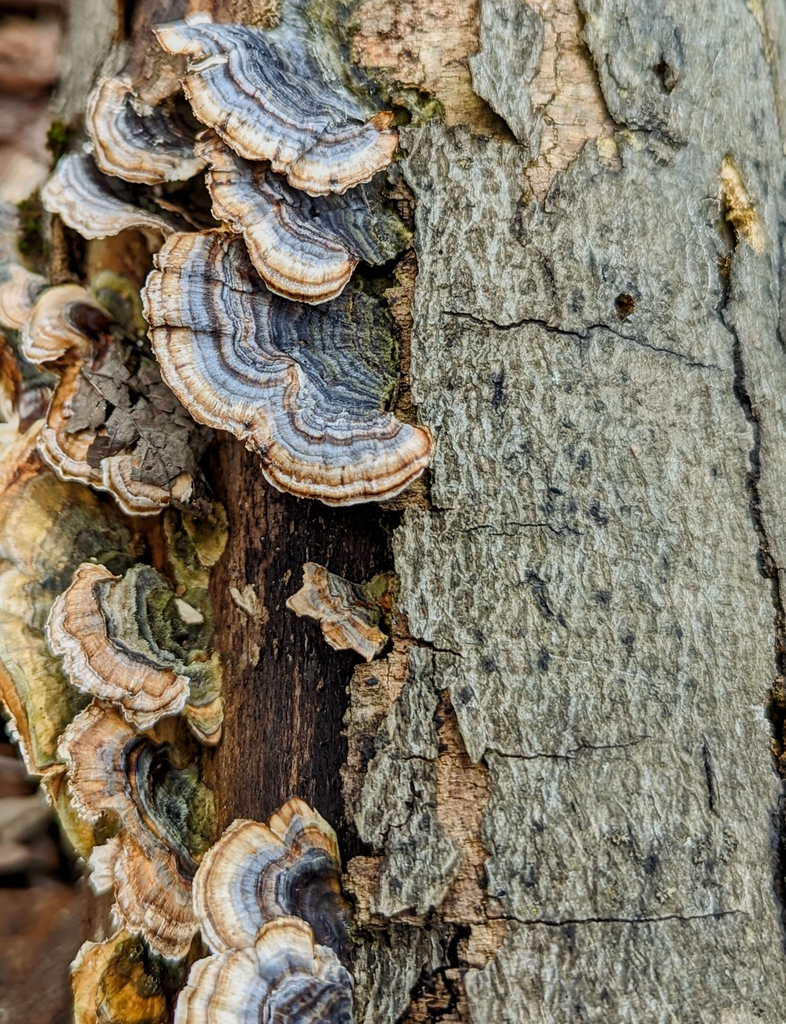
T. versicolor on rotting wood

Although polysaccharide-K, an extract of T. versicolor, is approved in Japan as an adjuvant therapy in cancer treatment, it is not approved in the United States for treatment of cancer or any clinical condition. Extracts of turkey tail or the mushroom itself are commonly marketed as a dietary supplement for various health benefits, and quality can vary due to inconsistent processing and labeling.

== Etymology ==
Meaning 'of several colors', versicolor accurately describes this fungus that displays a unique blend of markings.

== Description ==
The fruiting body is somewhat semicircular, with no discernable stalk, and the tough flesh is 1–3 millimetres (1/16–1/8 in) thick. The cap is flat, up to 10 centimetres (4 in) across. It is often triangular or round, with zones of fine hairs coloured rust-brown or darker brown, sometimes with black zones. Underneath a layer of tomentum is a black layer, topping the whitish flesh. Older specimens can have zones with green algae growing on them.

The bottom surface of the cap shows typical concentric zones of different colors, with the margin always the lightest. There are 3–5 pores per mm. They are whitish to light brown, with pores round and with age twisted and labyrinthine.

=== Similar species ===
One similar-looking mushroom is Stereum ostrea (false turkey tail).

Other similar species include Trametes betulina, T. hirsuta, T. ochracea, T. suaveolens, Bjerkandera adusta, Cerrena unicolor, Lenzites betulina, and Stereum hirsutum. Other species of Stereum are similar, typically with a smooth undersurface, as well as some species of Trichaptum.

== Ecology ==
T. versicolor commonly grows in tiled layers in groups or rows on logs and stumps of deciduous trees. It is a white rot fungus which degrades lignin from lignocellulosic materials, such as wood.

The species may be eaten by caterpillars of the fungus moth Nemaxera betulinella, maggots of the fly Polyporivora picta, and the fungus gnat Mycetophila luctuosa.

== Uses ==
Trametes versicolor is considered too tough to eat, but can be prepared in many ways, such as teas and powders. It has been most notably consumed in China for thousands of years under the name "Yunzhi" (Chinese: 云芝).

The species may be used in traditional Chinese medicine or other herbalism practices.

Although polysaccharide-K is approved in Japan as an adjuvant therapy in cancer treatment, neither the extract nor the mushroom preparation is approved or prescribed in the United States for any clinical condition. It is commonly marketed as a dietary supplement for various health benefits, but lacks sufficient scientific evidence for safety or effectiveness, and quality can vary due to inconsistent processing and labeling.

== Gallery ==
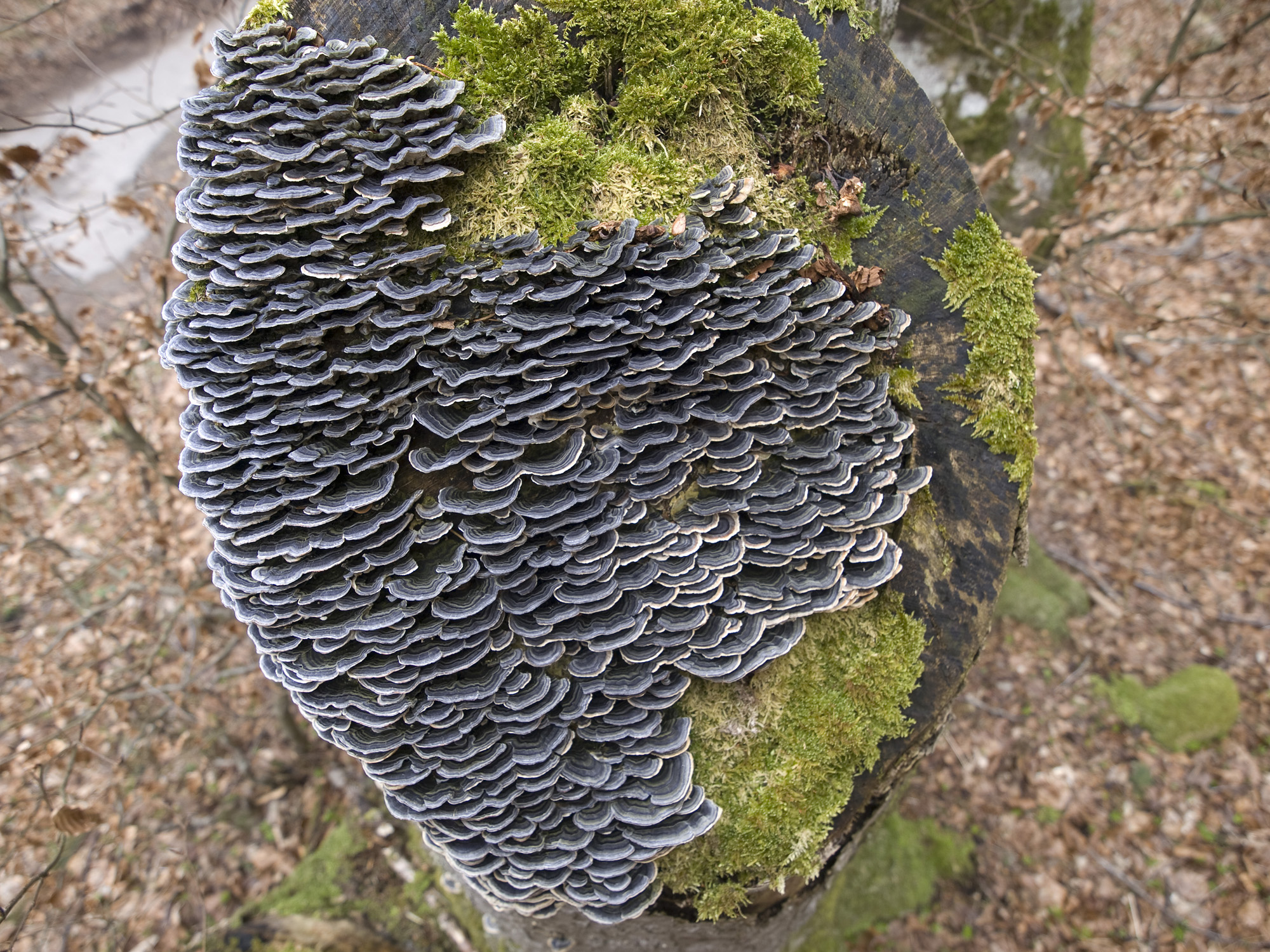
T. versicolor covering a stump

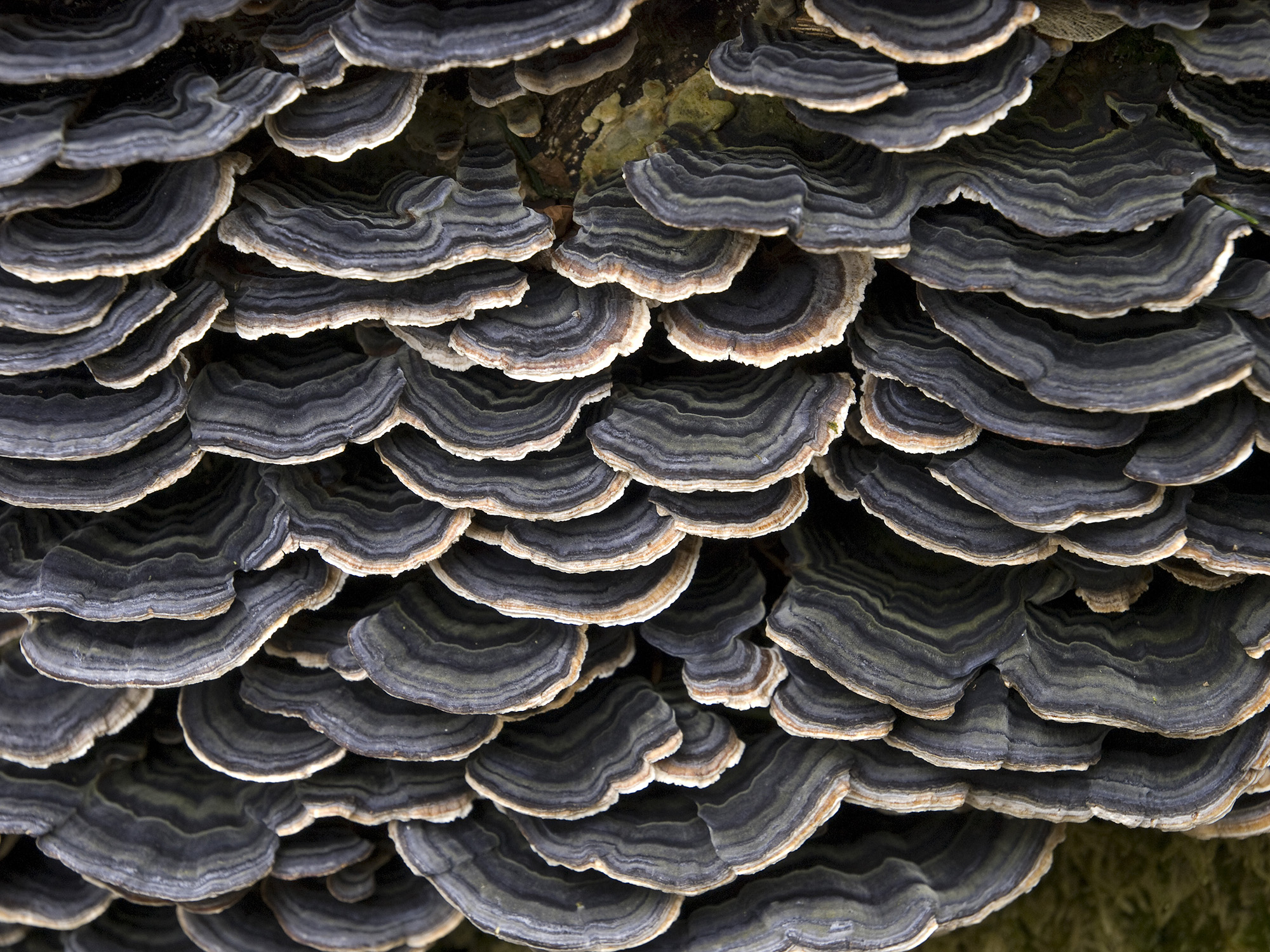
Close up of T. versicolor.

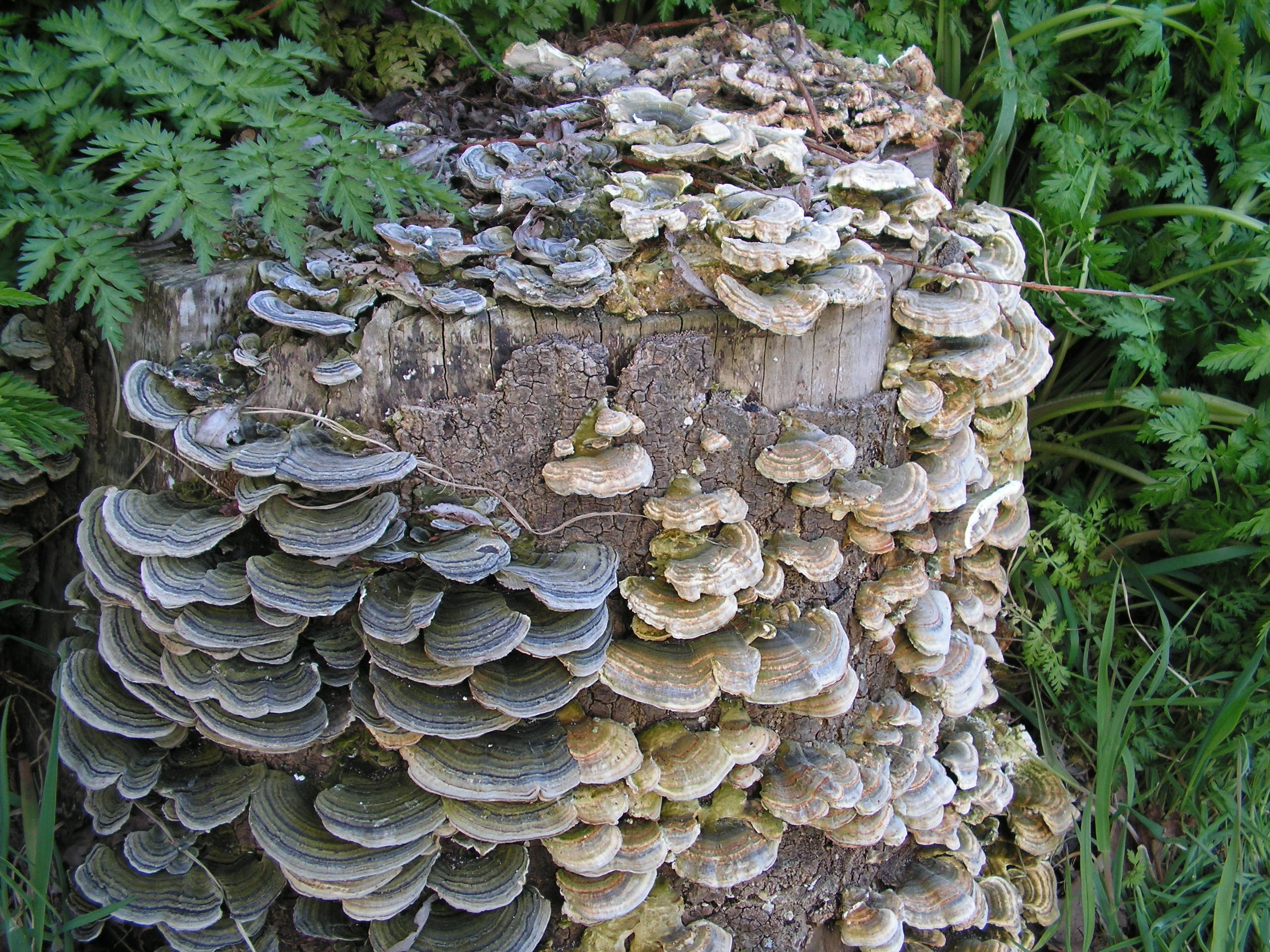
Color variation of T. versicolor on the same tree stump

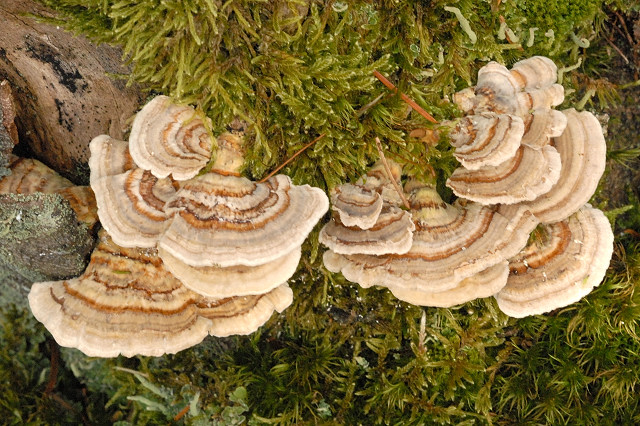
Pale specimens

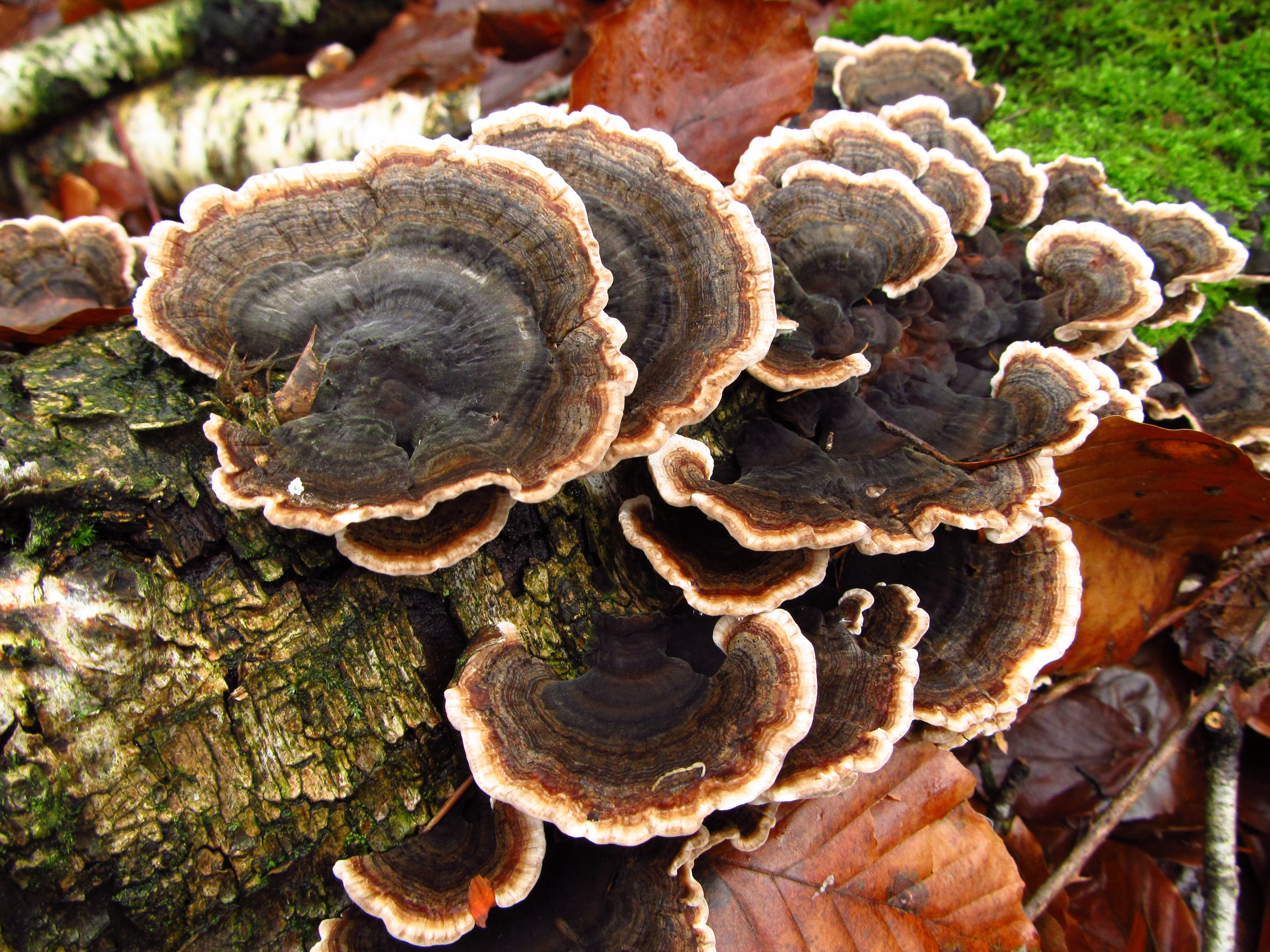
Brown variety

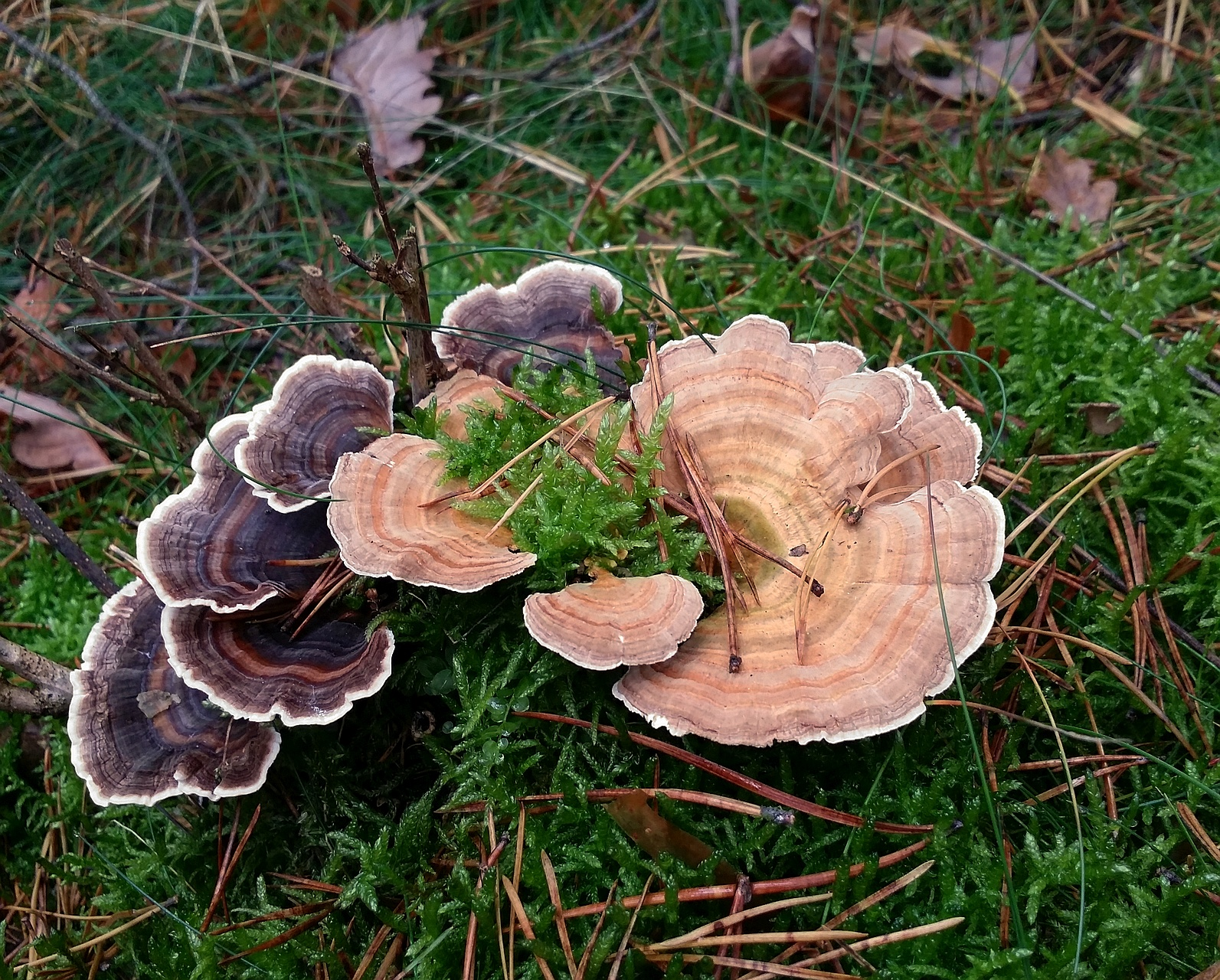
Pale and brown varieties side by side

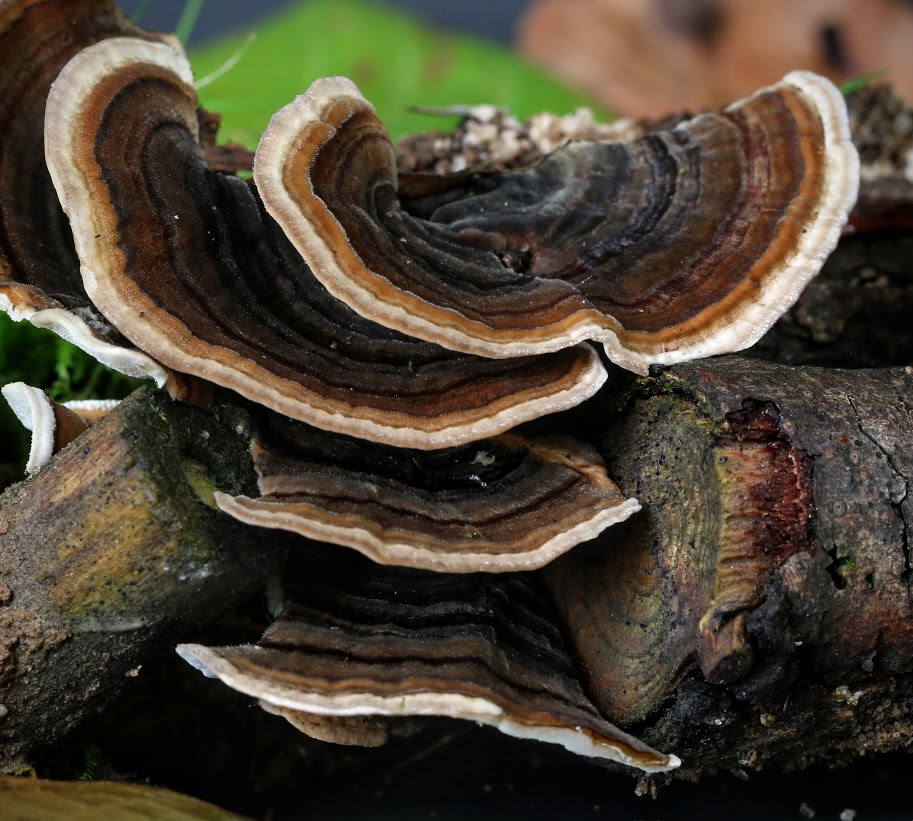
Brown variety in higher magnification

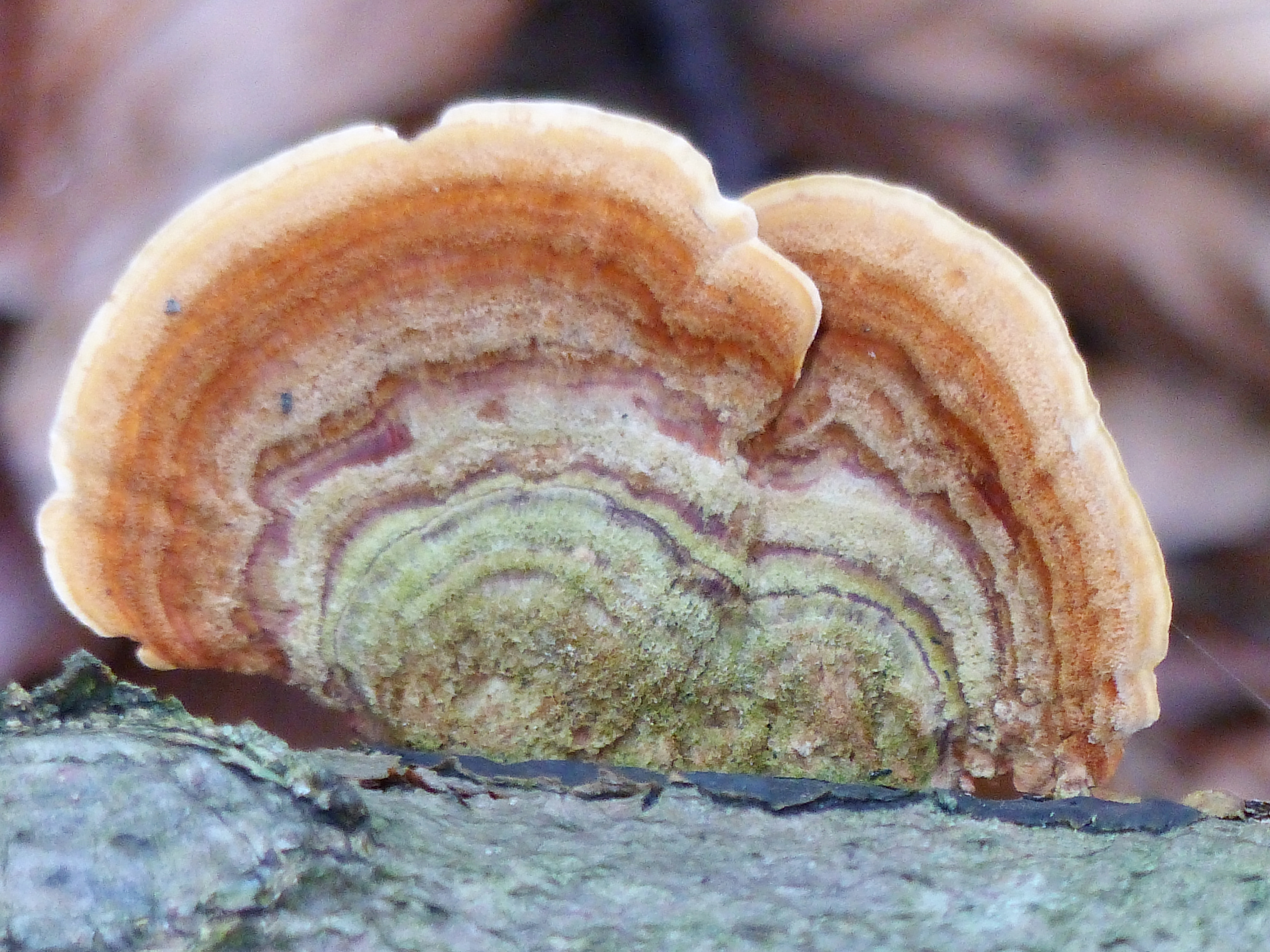
T. versicolor, pale variety

== See also ==
- List of Trametes species
- Polysaccharide peptide
- Medicinal fungi
