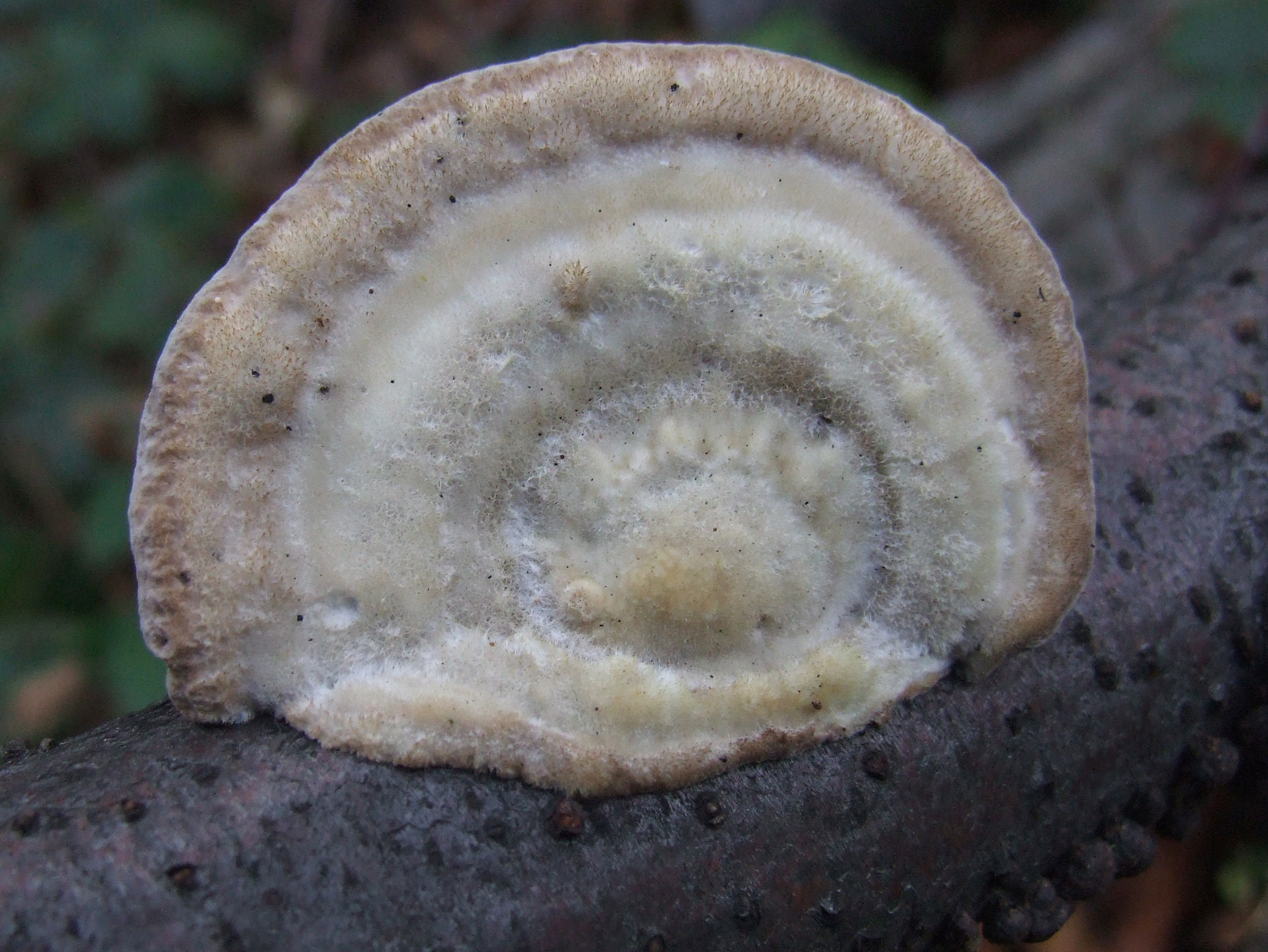

Scientific classification
- Kingdom: Fungi
- Division: Basidiomycota
- Class: Agaricomycetes
- Order: Polyporales
- Family: Polyporaceae
- Genus: Trametes
- Species: T. hirsuta

Binomial name
- Trametes hirsuta (Wulfen) Lloyd (1924)

Synonyms
- List: Boletus hirsutus Wulfen (1791); Boletus nigromarginatus Schwein. (1822); Boletus velutinus J.J.Planer (1788); Coriolus hirsutus (Wulfen) Pat. (1897); Coriolus nigromarginatus (Schwein.) Murrill (1905); Coriolus vellereus (Berk.) Pat. (1921); Coriolus velutinus P.Karst. (1906); Daedalea polyzona sensu auct. (2005); Fomes gourliei (Berk.) Cooke, (1885); Hansenia hirsuta (Wulfen) P.Karst. (1880); Hansenia vellerea (Berk.) P.Karst. (1880); Microporus galbanatus (Berk.) Kuntze (1898); Microporus hirsutus (Wulfen) Kuntze (1898); Microporus nigromarginatus (Schwein.) Kuntze, (1898); Microporus vellereus (Berk.) Kuntze (1898); Polyporus cinerescens Lév. (1844); Polyporus cinereus Lév. (1846); Polyporus fagicola Velen. (1922); Polyporus galbanatus Berk. (1843); Polyporus gourliei Berk. (1860); Polyporus hirsutus (Wulfen) Fr. (1821); Polyporus vellereus Berk. (1842); Polystictoides hirsutus (Wulfen) Lázaro Ibiza (1916); Polystictus cinerescens (Lév.) Sacc. (1888); Polystictus galbanatus (Berk.) Cooke (1886); Polystictus hirsutus (Wulfen) Fr. (1821); Polystictus nigromarginatus (Schwein.) P.W.Graff (1921); Polystictus vellereus (Berk.) Fr. (1851); Scindalma gourliei (Berk.) Kuntze (1898); Trametes porioides Lázaro Ibiza (1917)

= Trametes hirsuta =

Species of fungus

Trametes hirsuta
- Mycological characteristics
- Pores on hymenium
- No distinct cap
- Hymenium attachment is not applicable
- Lacks a stipe
- Spore print is white
- Ecology is saprotrophic
- Edibility is inedible

Trametes hirsuta, commonly known as hairy turkey tail or hairy bracket, is a species of fungus.

== Description ==
The cap is up to 15 centimetres (6 in) wide, exceptionally 30 cm. It is whitish gray, with short hairs and subtle zoning, sometimes tomentose and yellowish or darker near the margin. The flesh is tough, up to 5 millimetres (1/4 in) thick, with a soft gray upper layer and a whitish lower layer separated by a black plane. It is too tough for consumption.

=== Similar species ===
Similar species include T. pubescens, which is unzoned, buff in colour, and without layered flesh. T. versicolor is more distinctively zoned. T. occidentalis appears to be closely related.

== Ecology ==
It is found on dead wood of deciduous trees, especially beechwood. It is found all year round, persisting due to its leathery nature.

== Biotechnology ==
Lyophilized cell cultures of Trametes hirsuta yield aldehydes from alkenes, representing a biotransformation alternative to ozonolysis.

== See also ==
- List of Trametes species
