= Trametes nivosa =

Scientific classification
- Domain: Eukaryota
- Kingdom: Fungi
- Division: Basidiomycota
- Class: Agaricomycetes
- Order: Polyporales
- Family: Polyporaceae
- Genus: Trametes
- Species: T. nivosa

Binomial name
- Trametes nivosa (Berk.) Murrill (1907)

Synonyms
- List: Coriolus hollickii Murrill (1910); Fomitopsis nivosa (Berk.) Gilb. & Ryvarden (1986); Hapalopilus fulvitinctus (Berk. & M.A.Curtis) Murrill (1904); Leptoporus nivosus (Berk.) Pat. (1900); Pilatoporus nivosus (Berk.) Kotl. & Pouzar (1993); Polyporus fulvitinctus Berk. & M.A.Curtis (1868); Polyporus griseodurus Lloyd (1918); Polyporus nivosellus (Murrill) Sacc. & Trotter (1912); Polyporus nivosus Berk. (1856); Polyporus palmarum (Murrill) Sacc. & Trotter (1912); Polyporus ungulatus (Berk.) Sacc. (1888); Polystictus fulvotinctus (Berk. & M.A.Curtis) Cooke [as 'fulvi-tinctus'], (1886); Polystictus hollickii (Murrill) Sacc. & Trotter (1912); Trametes griseodurus (Lloyd) Teng (1963); Trametes ungulata Berk. (1872); Tyromyces fulvitinctus (Berk. & M.A.Curtis) Murrill (1907); Tyromyces nivosellus Murrill (1907); Tyromyces palmarum Murrill (1907)

Species of fungus

Trametes nivosa is a species of fungus in the family Polyporaceae.
