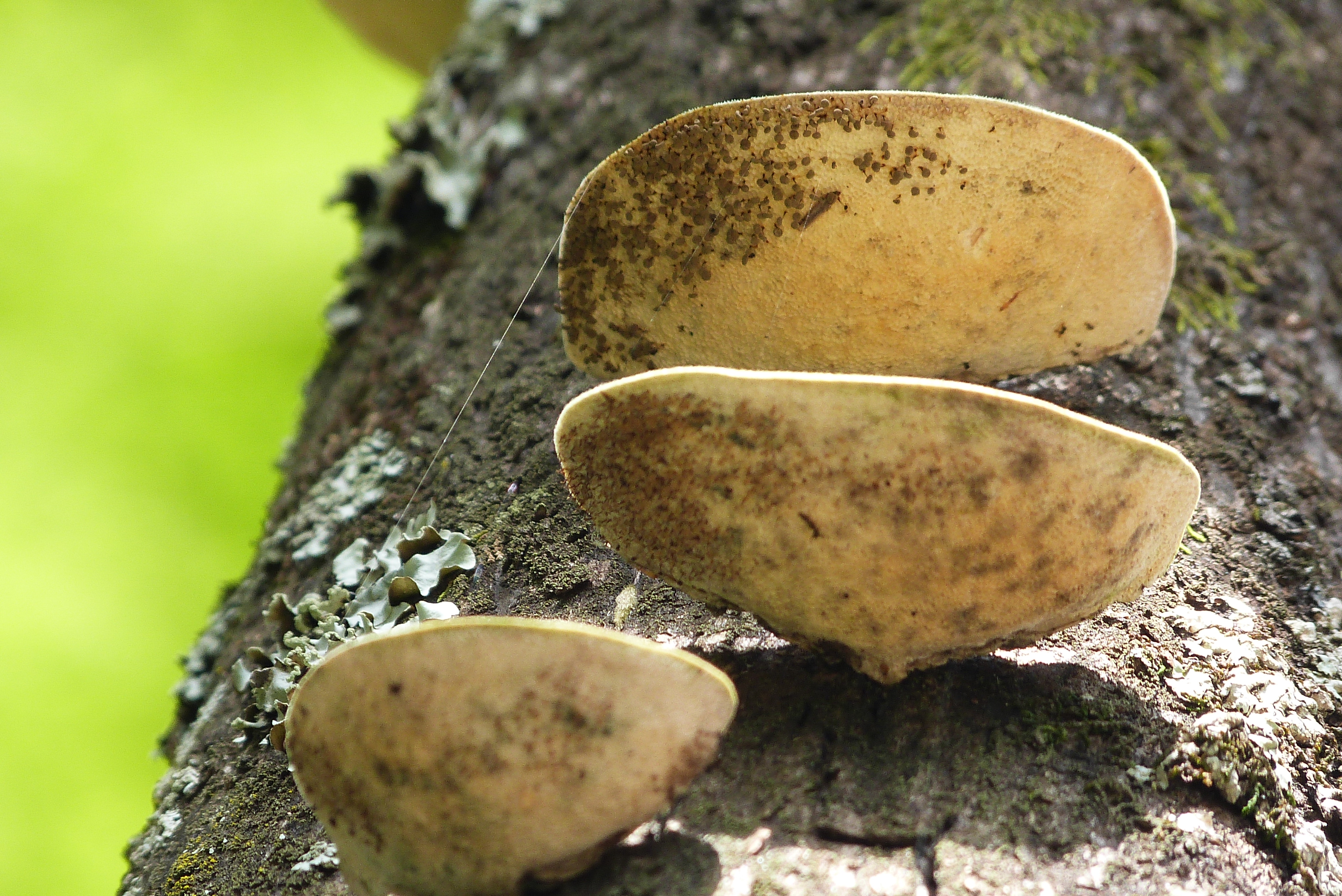

Scientific classification
- Kingdom: Fungi
- Division: Basidiomycota
- Class: Agaricomycetes
- Order: Polyporales
- Family: Polyporaceae
- Genus: Trametes
- Species: T. elegans

Binomial name
- Trametes elegans (Spreng.) Pat.

Synonyms
- Artolenzites elegans; Daedalea elegans; Daedaleopsis elegans; Lenzites elegans; Whitfordia elegans

= Trametes elegans =

Species of mushroom

Trametes elegans
- Mycological characteristics
- Pores on hymenium
- Cap is offset or indistinct
- Hymenium is decurrent
- Lacks a stipe
- Spore print is white
- Ecology is saprotrophic
- Edibility is inedible

Trametes elegans, also known as Lenzites elegans and Daedalea elegans, is a common polypore and wood-decay fungus with a pantropical distribution found on hardwood hosts in regions including Australia, New Zealand, and Japan. It has recently been suggested to be a complex of three different species: T. elegans, T. aesculi, and T. repanda.

== Morphology ==
The basidiocarp of T. elegans is brown with narrow semi-dadeloid pores. The pore surface is yellow, with a dark line separating the lower context and the upper tomentum. Defining characteristics of T. elegans include skeletal hyphae, thin-walled basidiospores, and a poroid hymenophore. T. elegans has no stipe and has a corky texture. It is circular, sessile, and flabelliform in shape. It is flexible when fresh and becomes more rigid as it dries. The fruiting body of T. elegans is leathery and grows alone on dead wood. It is off-white, velvety, and has aerial hyphae in secondary mycelial culture.

== Ecology ==
T. elegans shares a commensalistic relationship with various host plants where it provides protection to the plant against assault from other pathogens. Additionally, T. elegans is endophytic. As T. elegans belongs to the white rot fungi group, they are important in breaking down lignin from trees and they do so extracellularly, non-specifically, and non-hydrolytically. This is important for recycling carbon in forest ecosystems.

== Habitat ==
T. elegans prefers an intermediate temperature range of around 25-35 °C and can grow in both the soil and on synthetic media. Additionally, they prefer to inhabit rotting wood and leaf litter in tropical forests. They prefer hardwood forests.

== Geographical distribution ==
Trametes elegans is most common in tropical hardwood forests. Places where it occurs include West Africa, Australia, New Zealand, Japan, and the southern United States.
