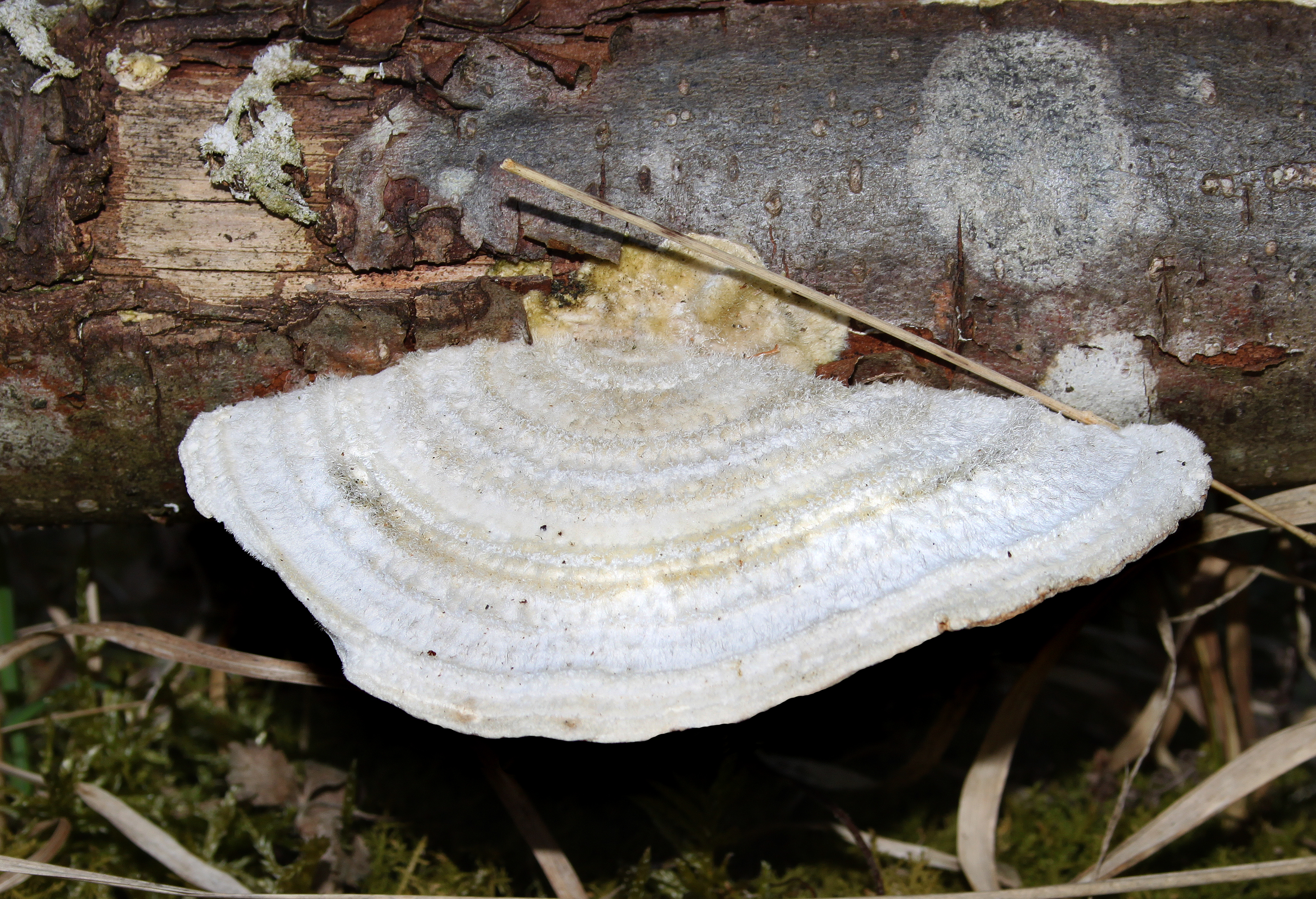

Scientific classification
- Kingdom: Fungi
- Division: Basidiomycota
- Class: Agaricomycetes
- Order: Polyporales
- Family: Polyporaceae
- Genus: Trametes
- Species: T. pubescens

Binomial name
- Trametes pubescens (Schumach.) Pilát (1939)

Synonyms
- Trametes velutina (P. Karst.) G. Cunn. (1965)

= Trametes pubescens =

Species of fungus

Trametes pubescens is a small, thin species of polypore, or bracket fungus. It has a cream-colored, finely velvety cap surface. Unlike most other turkey tail-like species of Trametes, the cap surface lacks strongly contrasting zones of color.

Trametes pubescens is an annual, saprobic fungus, a decomposer of the deadwood of hardwoods, growing in clusters on logs, stumps and downed branches. (It is rarely reported on conifer wood.) It is a purported plant pathogen, infecting peach and nectarine trees. It is inedible.

The genome of T. pubescens has been published in 2017 by Zoraide Granchi and coworkers from the OPTIBIOCAT project. The genome contains 39.7 million bases. The consortium estimates that there are 14,451 different genes, which is quite average among saprobic wood-rotting species. The sequencing has been performed in Leiden, The Netherlands.
