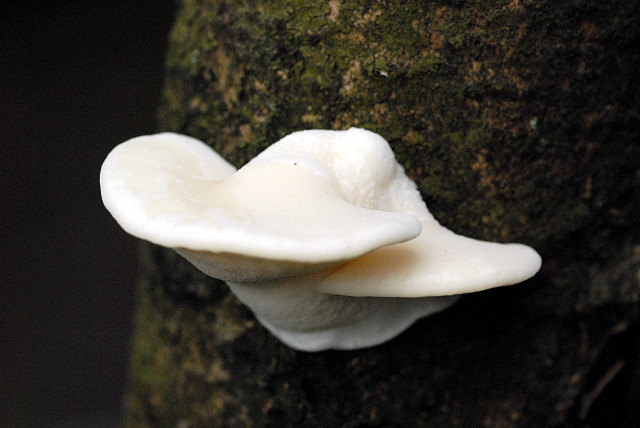
- Trametes suaveolens

Scientific classification
- Domain: Eukaryota
- Kingdom: Fungi
- Division: Basidiomycota
- Class: Agaricomycetes
- Order: Polyporales
- Family: Polyporaceae
- Genus: Trametes
- Species: T. suaveolens

Binomial name
- Trametes suaveolens (L.) Fries, 1838

= Trametes suaveolens =

Species of fungus

Trametes suaveolens is a species of fungus belonging to the family Polyporaceae.

Synonym:

- Boletus suaveolens L., 1753 (= basionym)
