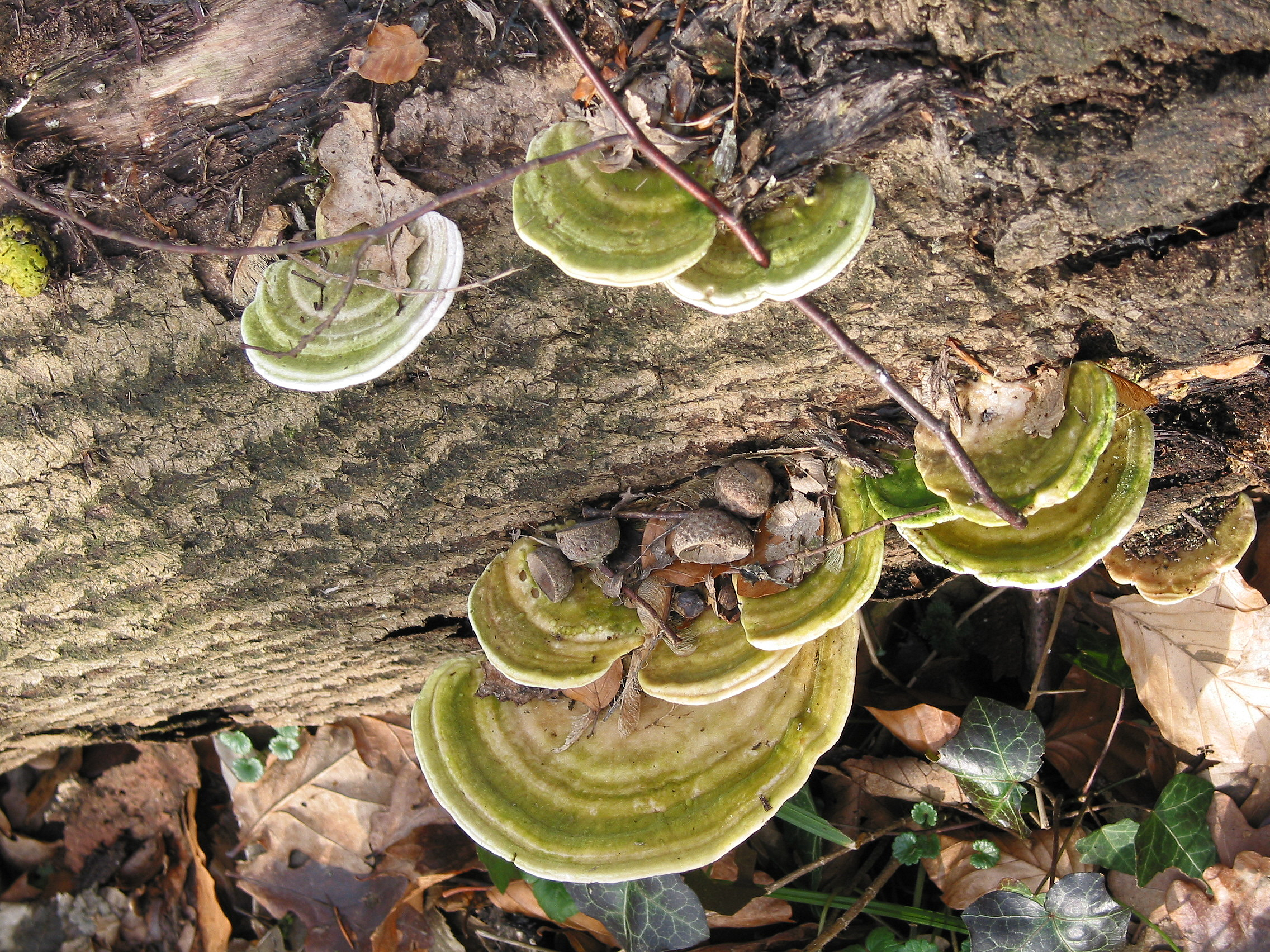
- Trametes gibbosa

Scientific classification
- Domain: Eukaryota
- Kingdom: Fungi
- Division: Basidiomycota
- Class: Agaricomycetes
- Order: Polyporales
- Family: Polyporaceae
- Genus: Trametes; Fr. (1836)

Type species
- Trametes suaveolens (L.) Fr. (1838)

Synonyms
- Species synonymy: Cellularia Bull. (1788); Favolus P.Beauv. (1805); Pherima Raf. (1819); Phorima Raf. (1830); Polyporus trib. Scenidium Klotzsch (1832); Hexagonia Fr. (1836); Hansenia P.Karst. (1879); Coriolus Quél. (1886); Sclerodepsis Cooke (1890); Scenidium Klotzsch ex Kuntze (1898); Pogonomyces Murrill (1904); Cubamyces Murrill (1905); Artolenzites Falck (1909); Pseudotrametes Bondartsev & Singer (1941); Pseudotrametes Bondartsev & Singer (1944); Tomentoporus Ryvarden (1973)

= Trametes =

Genus of fungi

Trametes is a genus of fungi that is distinguished by a pileate basidiocarp, di- to trimitic hyphal systems, smooth non-dextrinoid spores, and a hymenium usually without true hymenial cystidia. The genus has a widespread distribution and contains about 195 species. The genus was circumscribed by Elias Magnus Fries in 1836.

Trametes fungi are food for caterpillars of certain Lepidoptera, mainly fungus moths (Tineidae) such as Triaxomera parasitella.

== Biotechnology ==
Several species of Trametes have been investigated for biotechnological application of their lignin-degrading enzymes (particularly laccase and manganese peroxidase) for analytical, industrial or environmental sciences.

== Selected species ==
- Trametes gibbosa – Lumpy bracket
- Trametes hirsuta – Hairy bracket
- Trametes nivosa
- Trametes pubescens
- Trametes versicolor – Turkey tail
