= Xerotus drummondii =

Scientific classification
- Domain: Eukaryota
- Kingdom: Fungi
- Division: Basidiomycota
- Class: Agaricomycetes
- Order: Polyporales
- Family: Polyporaceae
- Genus: Xerotus
- Species: X. drummondii

Binomial name
- Xerotus drummondii Berk. ex Cooke

Species of fungus

Xerotus drummondii is a species of fungus.
