= Myriothele =

Scientific classification
- Kingdom: Fungi
- Division: Basidiomycota
- Class: Agaricomycetes
- Order: Polyporales
- Family: Polyporaceae
- Genus: Myriothele; K.K.Nakasone (2013)

Type species
- Myriothele philippiae (Boidin & Gilles) K.K.Nakasone (2013)

Synonyms
- Epithele philippiae Boidin & Gilles (2000)

Genus of fungi

Myriothele is a fungal genus in the family Polyporaceae. It is a monotypic genus, consisting of the single species Myriothele philippiae, a toothed crust fungus found in Réunion.

== Taxonomy ==
Myriothele philippiae was originally described by mycologists Jacques Boidin and Gérard Gilles in 2000 as a member of the genus Epithele. In a 2013 review of the genus, Karen Nakasone noted several uniques features found in this species that were not characteristic of Epithele, and she proposed a new genus and new combination.

The generic name, derived from the Greek words myrio- ("countless" or "very many" and thele ("nipple"), refers to the numerous hyphal pegs. The specific epithet philippiae refers to the host plant Philippia. Although Nakasone refers to the fungus as "clearly not related to Epithele or the Polyporales", Index Fungorum classifies the species as a member of the family Polyporaceae.

== Description ==
The fruit body of a Myriothele fungus is in the form of thick, soft crust. The fertile, spore-bearing part of the crust surface, or hymenium, features "teeth" that originate from hyphal pegs. Hyphal pegs are bundles of hyphae that originate in the trama and project into the hymenium. The hyphal system is monomitic, meaning that there are only generative hyphae, and these hyphae have clamp connections. The subhymenium (a supportive tissue underneath the hymenium) consists of upright hyphidia, cystidia, and hyphae. The basidia (spore-bearing cells) are distinctly urniform (urn-like), clamped at the base, and have four sterigmata. The spores are broadly ellipsoid to roughly spherical in shape with hyaline, smooth, acyanophilous, and inamyloid walls. These walls swell in a solution of potassium hydroxide.
