= F. portoricensis =

F. portoricensis may refer to:

- Ficus portoricensis, a banyan found in the Americas
- Finkia portoricensis, a sac fungus
- Forsteronia portoricensis, synonym of Pinochia corymbosa subsp. portoricensis, a plant endemic to Puerto Rico
- Fuscocerrena portoricensis, a bracket fungus
