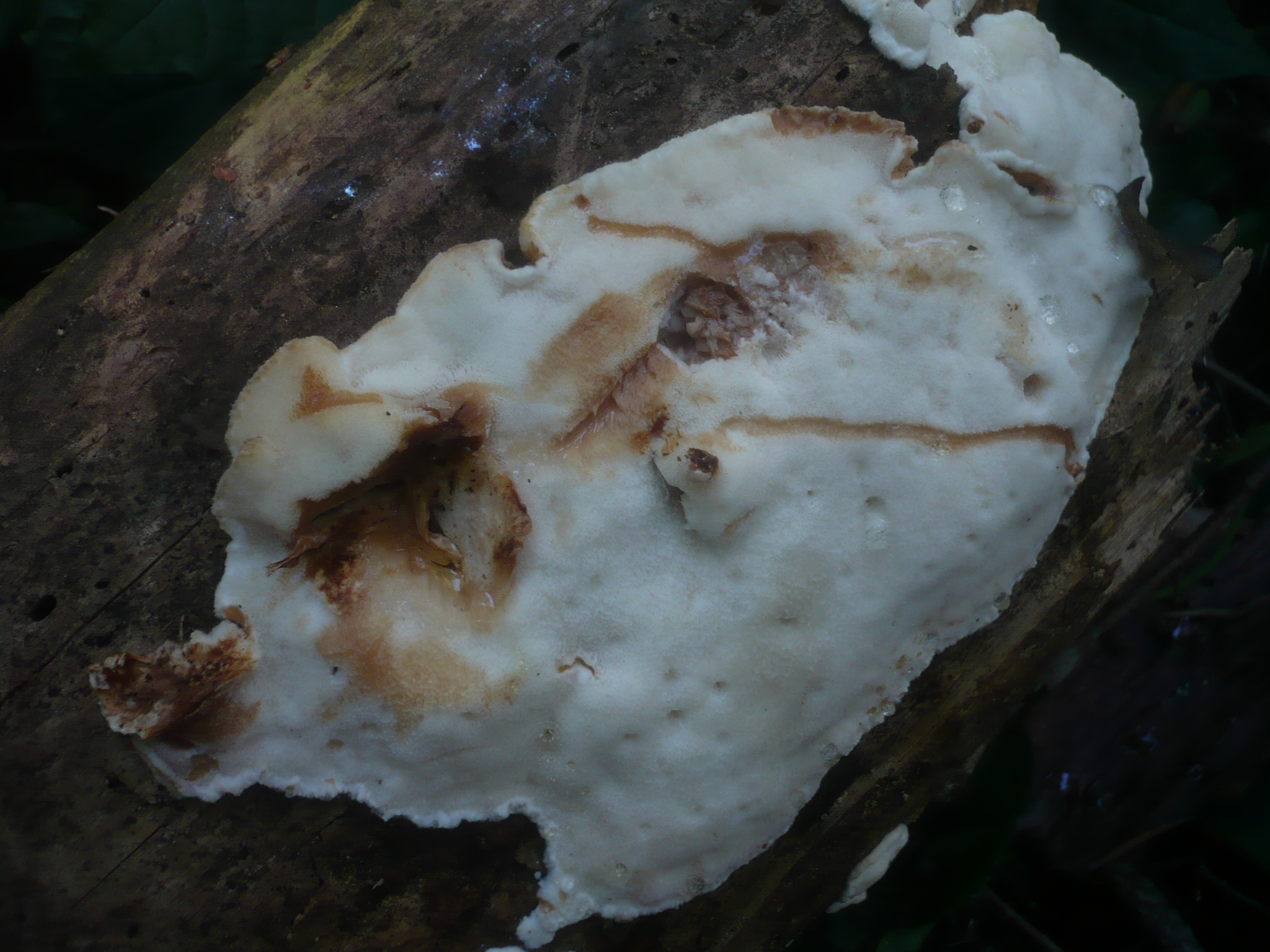
- Sarcoporia polyspora

Scientific classification
- Kingdom: Fungi
- Division: Basidiomycota
- Class: Agaricomycetes
- Order: Polyporales
- Family: Polyporaceae
- Genus: Sarcoporia; P.Karst. (1894)

Type species
- Sarcoporia polyspora P.Karst. (1894)

Species
- S. longitubulata S. neotropica S. polyspora

= Sarcoporia =

Genus of fungi

Sarcoporia is a genus of polypore fungi in the family Polyporaceae. The genus was circumscribed by Petter Karsten in 1894, with the widespread fungus Sarcoporia polyspora as the type species. The genus name combines the Ancient Greek words σάρξ ("flesh") and πόρος ("pore").

== Species ==
- Sarcoporia longitubulata Vlasák & Spirin (2015) – USA; Macaronesia
- Sarcoporia neotropica Ryvarden (2012) – Costa Rica
- Sarcoporia polyspora P.Karst. (1894) – Asia; Europe; North America; South America

The fungus Sarcoporia salmonicolor (Berk. & M.A.Curtis) Teixeira 1986 was made the type species of the monotypic genus Erastia in 2005.
