= Cystidioporia piceicola =

Scientific classification
- Kingdom: Fungi
- Division: Basidiomycota
- Class: Agaricomycetes
- Order: Polyporales
- Family: Polyporaceae
- Genus: Cystidioporia
- Species: C. piceicola

Binomial name
- Cystidioporia piceicola (Y.C. Dai) B.K. Cui & Xing Ji (2023)

Synonyms
- Perenniporia piceicola Y.C.Dai (2002)

Species of fungus

Cystidioporia piceicola is a species of poroid crust fungus that is found on fallen spruce in Yunnan province, China. Basidiocarps are corky in texture, 5 cm (2 in) or more across with a characteristic pale yellow pore surface. The basidiospores are ellipsoid and hyaline and very large for the genus, up to 13 μm in length.
