= Navisporus =

Scientific classification
- Kingdom: Fungi
- Division: Basidiomycota
- Class: Agaricomycetes
- Order: Polyporales
- Family: Polyporaceae
- Genus: Navisporus; Ryvarden (1980)

Type species
- Navisporus floccosa (Bres.) Ryvarden (1980)

Species
- N. africanus; N. floccosus; N. minutus; N. perennis; N. reflexus; N. sulcatus; N. terrestris

Genus of fungi

Navisporus is a genus of seven species of tropical poroid fungi in the family Polyporaceae. It was circumscribed by Norwegian mycologist Leif Ryvarden in 1980 with Navisporus floccosus as the type species. This fungus, first described as Trametes floccosa by Giacomo Bresadola in 1896, is thought to have been originally collected in Tanzania.

== Description ==
Navisporus fungi have pale brown to brown context, and a dimitic hyphal system, meaning they have both generative and skeletal hyphae. Ryvarden described the genus as being close to Pseudopiptoporus (published by Ryvarden simultaneously with Navisporus), but with dextrinoid skeletal hyphae, and lacking gloeopleurous hyphae. Navisporus spores are long, navicular (boat-shaped) and non-dextrinoid. N. terrestris is the only species in the genus that has a fruit body with a stipe, and also the only member of the genus that fruits on soil All of the other species fruit as a stipeless (sessile) cap on dead wood, or alternately in effused-reflexed form—i.e., a crust fungus with margins that form caps.

== Species ==
- Navisporus africanus Ryvarden(2000) – Africa
- Navisporus floccosus (Bres.) Ryvarden (1980) – Africa, Mexico; Cuba; South America
- Navisporus minutus Ryvarden (2018) – Cameroon
- Navisporus perennis Ryvarden & Iturr. (2004) – Venezuela
- Navisporus reflexus Ryvarden (2018) – Central African Republic
- Navisporus sulcatus (Lloyd) Ryvarden (1983) – South America; French Antilles; United States
- Navisporus terrestris Gibertoni & Ryvarden (2004) – Brazil

Navisporus ortizii S.Herrera & Bondartseva, a taxon described from Cuba in 1989, was later found to be conspecific with Perenniporia martius.
