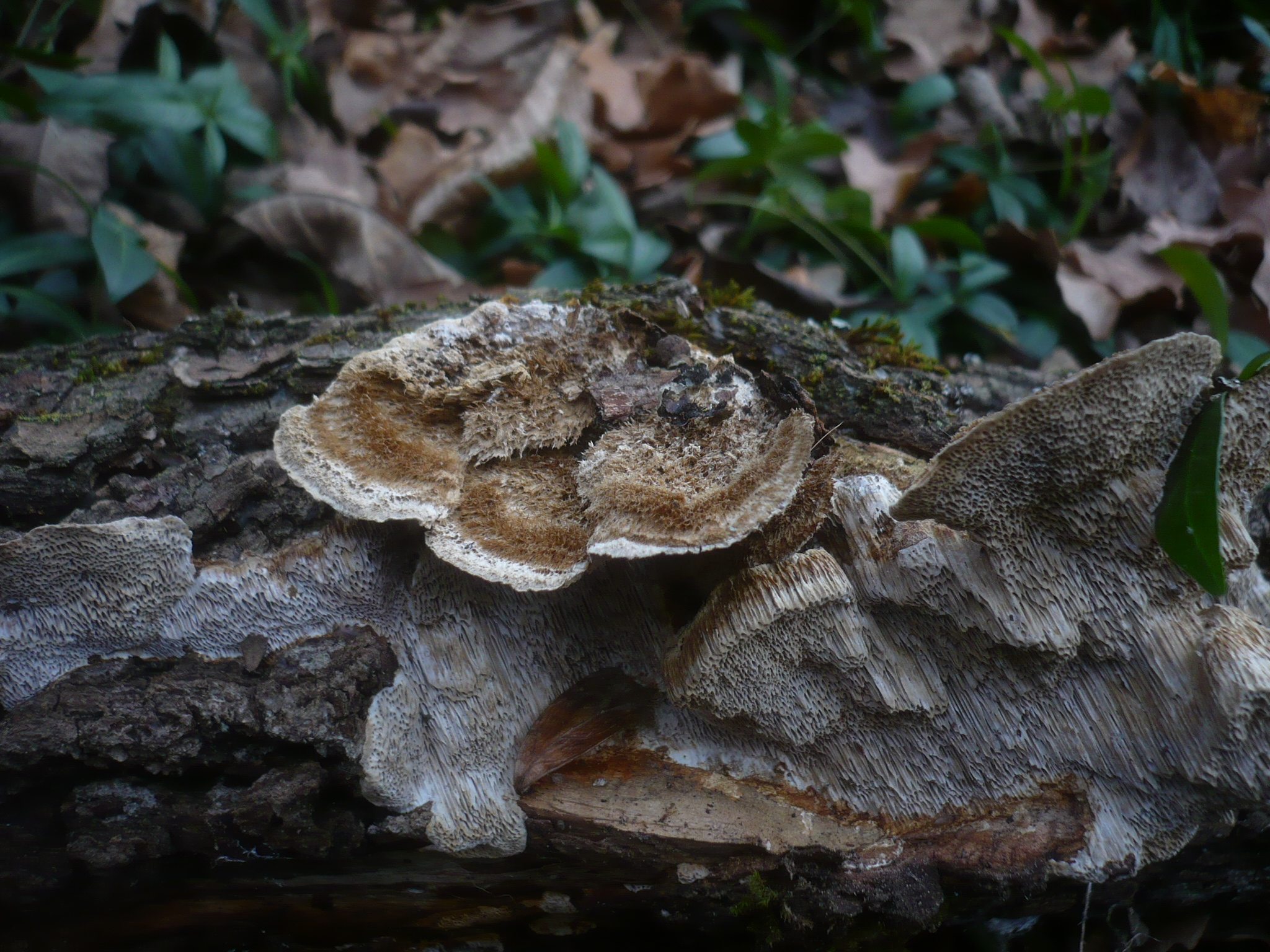

Scientific classification
- Domain: Eukaryota
- Kingdom: Fungi
- Division: Basidiomycota
- Class: Agaricomycetes
- Order: Polyporales
- Family: Polyporaceae
- Genus: Coriolopsis
- Species: C. gallica

Binomial name
- Coriolopsis gallica (Fr.) Ryvarden (1973)

Synonyms
- Polyporus gallicus Fr. (1821)

= Coriolopsis gallica =

Species of fungus

Coriolopsis gallica, the brownflesh bracket, is a fungus found growing on decaying wood. It is not associated with any plant disease, therefore it is not considered pathogenic. For various Coriolopsis gallica strains isolated, it has been found, as a common feature of the division Basidiomycota, that they are able to degrade wood components, mainly lignin and to lesser extent cellulose, which results in a degradation area covered by the accumulating white cellulose powder. Therefore, C. gallica might generically be called, as with many other basidiomycetes, a "white-rot" fungus.

This feature of preferential degradation of lignin components, such as melanoidins, polyphenols, and other aromatic compounds is of biotechnological interest in the industries of paper (recycling and bleaching), beer and sugar cane production and for the bioremediation of waste waters produced in these and other industrial activities. While in Basidiomycota, the lignolytic activities are jointly played by enzymes such as laccases, manganese peroxidases and lignin peroxidases, in Coriolopsis gallica, as well as in the phylogenetically related Trametes spp., laccases (even in multiple genomic copies) are the main mechanisms involved in lignin modification. In other well-studied white-rot basidiomycota, for example Phanerochaete spp., virtually no laccase activity is involved in lignin biodegradation.
