= Minoporus minor =

Scientific classification
- Domain: Eukaryota
- Kingdom: Fungi
- Division: Basidiomycota
- Class: Agaricomycetes
- Order: Polyporales
- Family: Polyporaceae
- Genus: Minoporus
- Species: M. minor

Binomial name
- Minoporus minor (Y.C. Dai & H.X. Xiong) B.K. Cui & Xing Ji (2023)

Synonyms
- Perenniporia minor Y.C.Dai & H.X.Xiong (2008)

Species of fungus

Minoporus minor is a poroid fungus in the family Polyporaceae. It was described as a new species in 2008 by mycologists Yu-Cheng Dai and Hong-Xia Xiong. The type specimen was collected in Changbaishan Nature Reserve in Jilin province, where it was found growing on fallen angiosperm branches at an altitude of 1,100 metres (3,600 ft).

Minoporus minor has tiny fruit bodies with caps measuring up to 1 cm (0.4 in) wide and 0.3 cm (0.1 in) thick. It is this feature to which the specific epithet minor refers. The colour of the cap surface is initially pale buff, darkening slightly with age. The pores on the undersurface of the cap and tiny and round, numbering 4–6 per millimetre. Microscopically, the fungus is characterized by the almost negative reaction of the skeletal hyphae to Melzer's reagent.
