= Mollicarpus =

Scientific classification
- Kingdom: Fungi
- Division: Basidiomycota
- Class: Agaricomycetes
- Order: Polyporales
- Family: Polyporaceae
- Genus: Mollicarpus; Ginns (1984)

Type species
- Mollicarpus cognates (Berk.) Ginns (1984)

Synonyms
- Trametes cognatus Berk. (1878); Coriolopsis cognatus (Berk.) Ryvarden (1984); Trametes cognata var. crassior Corner (1989); Trametes cognata var. microspora Corner (1989); Hexagonia cognata (Berk.) Teixeira (1994)

Genus of fungi

Mollicarpus is a fungal genus in the family Polyporaceae. It was circumscribed in 1984 by mycologist Walter Ginns to contain the species Mollicarpus cognatus. This fungus was first described by Miles Joseph Berkeley in 1877 as Trametes cognatus. Mollicarpus cognatus has short, broadly ellipsoid spores, and cyanophilous binding hyphae that are usually dextrinoid. These features are not present in members of the similar genus Coriolopsis. Mollicarpus cognatus is known only from southeast Asia, where it grows on rotting wood.
