= Dextrinoporus =

Scientific classification
- Kingdom: Fungi
- Division: Basidiomycota
- Class: Agaricomycetes
- Order: Polyporales
- Family: Polyporaceae
- Genus: Dextrinoporus; H.S.Yuan (2018)

Type species
- Dextrinoporus aquaticus H.S.Yuan (2018)

Genus of fungi

Dextrinoporus is a fungal genus in the family Polyporaceae. It was circumscribed by mycologists Hai-Sheng Yuan and Wen-Min Qin in 2018 to contain the single poroid species Dextrinoporus aquaticus. This white-rot wood-decay fungus is found in southwestern China.

== Taxonomy ==
The type collection was discovered fruiting on an angiosperm trunk in Dayaoshan Nature Reserve in Jinxiu County, Guangxi. The generic name refers to the dextrinoid reaction of the hyphal trama with Melzer's reagent; the specific epithet aquaticus alludes to the watery texture of fresh fruit bodies. Dextrinoporus occupies an isolated phylogenetic position in the "core polyporoid clade" (a phylogenetic grouping roughly equivalent to the Polyporaceae), related to the clade containing the crust fungi Lopharia cinerascens and Dentocorticium sulphurellum.

== Description ==
Dextrinoporus fruit bodies are shelf-like and broadly attached to the substrate, measuring up to 15 cm (5.9 in) broad, 7 cm (2.8 in) wide and 4 cm (1.6 in) thick at the base. The dimensions of the watery fresh specimens decrease substantially upon drying, becoming up to one-third of the original size. The pores on the underside of the cap are angular to irregular in outline, and number 1–2 per millimetre.

Microscopic characteristics of Dextrinoporus include: a monomitic hyphal structure featuring thick-walled, dextrinoid generative hyphae with clamp connections; presence of dendrohyphidia in the hymenium; and ellipsoid, thin-walled spores.

Other polypores with morphological similarities to D. aquaticus include Spongipellis spumeus , Tyromyces chioneus, and Oligoporus tephroleucus.
