= Cystidiophorus =

Scientific classification
- Kingdom: Fungi
- Division: Basidiomycota
- Class: Agaricomycetes
- Order: Polyporales
- Family: Polyporaceae
- Genus: Cystidiophorus; Bondartsev & Ljub. (1963)

Type species
- Cystidiophorus merulioideus Bondartsev & Ljub. (1963)

Genus of fungi

Cystidiophorus is a genus of fungi in the family Polyporaceae. It is a monotypic genus, containing the single species Cystidiophorus merulioideus, known from Asia and eastern Russia. The genus and species were described in 1963.
