= Perenniporiopsis =

Scientific classification
- Kingdom: Fungi
- Division: Basidiomycota
- Class: Agaricomycetes
- Order: Polyporales
- Family: Polyporaceae
- Genus: Perenniporiopsis; C.L. Zhao (2017)

Type species
- Perenniporiopsis minutissima C.L. Zhao (2017)

Genus of fungi

Perenniporiopsis is a genus of fungi belonging to the Polyporaceae family. It was documented in 2017 by Chang Lin Zhao. It contains the single species: Perenniporiopsis minutissima.
