= Austrolentinus =

Scientific classification
- Kingdom: Fungi
- Division: Basidiomycota
- Class: Agaricomycetes
- Order: Polyporales
- Family: Polyporaceae
- Genus: Austrolentinus; Ryvarden (1991)

Type species
- Austrolentinus tenebrosus (Corner) Ryvarden (1991)

Synonyms
- Panus tenebrosus Corner (1981); Lentinus tenebrosus (Corner) Pegler (1984)

Genus of fungi

Austrolentinus is a fungal genus in the family Polyporaceae. Segregated from the genus Lentinus, it is monotypic, containing the single species Austrolentinus tenebrosus, which was first described by E.J.H. Corner in 1981 as Panus tenebrosus. Austrolentinus was circumscribed by Norwegian mycologist Leif Ryvarden in 1991. The fungus occurs in Queensland, Solomon Islands and Papua New Guinea, and the Malay Peninsula.
