= Melanoderma =

Scientific classification
- Kingdom: Fungi
- Division: Basidiomycota
- Class: Agaricomycetes
- Order: Polyporales
- Family: Polyporaceae
- Genus: Melanoderma; B.K.Cui & Y.C.Dai (2011)

Type species
- Melanoderma microcarpum B.K.Cui & Y.C.Dai (2011)

Species
- M. disciforme M. microcarpum

Genus of fungi

Melanoderma is a genus of two species of white rot poroid fungi in the family Polyporaceae. The genus was circumscribed in 2011 to accommodate the type species Melanoderma microcarpum, found in China. Melanoderma disciforme, found in Yunnan, was added to the genus in 2015. The generic name Melanoderma refers to the dark-coloured crust of the cap. Phylogenetic analyses shows that Melanoderma is closely related to the genus Vanderbylia.
