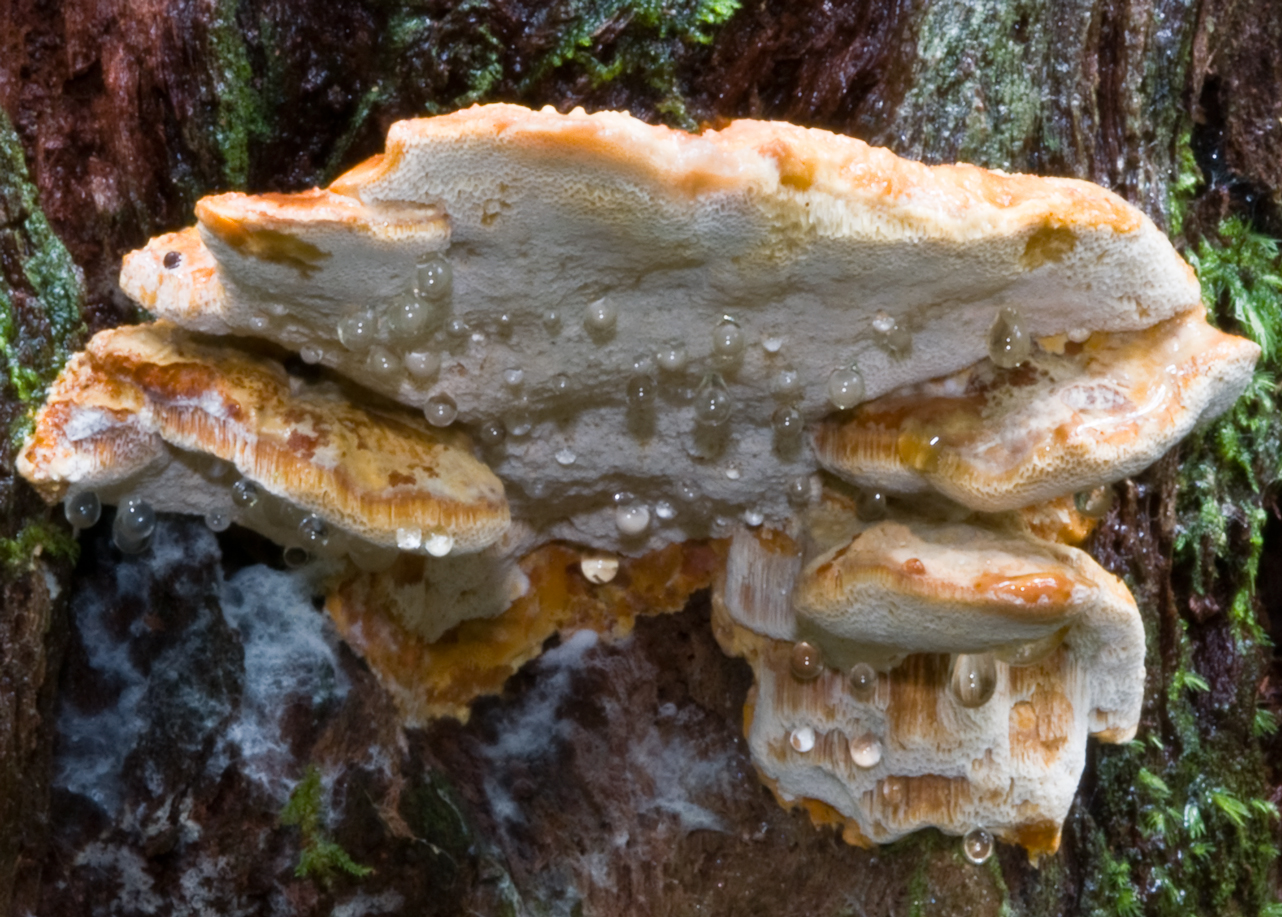
- Ryvardenia cretacea in New South Wales, Australia

Scientific classification
- Kingdom: Fungi
- Division: Basidiomycota
- Class: Agaricomycetes
- Order: Polyporales
- Family: Polyporaceae
- Genus: Ryvardenia; Rajchenb. (1994)

Type species
- Ryvardenia cretacea (Lloyd) Rajchenb. (1994)

Species
- R. campyla R. cretacea

= Ryvardenia =

Genus of fungi

Ryvardenia is a genus of fungi in the family Polyporaceae. It contains two species, Ryvardenia campyla (Berk.) Rajchenb. (1994) and the type, Ryvardenia cretacea (Lloyd) Rajchenb. (1994), formerly placed in the genus Polyporus. Ryvardenia was circumscribed by Argentinian botanist Mario Rachenberg in 1994.

The genus name of Ryvardenia is in honour of Leif Randulff Ryvarden (born 9 August 1935) who is a Norwegian mycologist.

Molecular analysis of specimens from Argentina and Australia has shown that the species separate into two distinct clades that are each restricted biogeographically to one side of the Pacific, suggesting that the taxa are speciating. However, there are no consistent morphological characteristics that can be used to distinguish between them, which according to Rajchenberg and Pildain "supports the maintenance of a complex but taxonomically single entity.
