= Neodatronia =

Scientific classification
- Kingdom: Fungi
- Division: Basidiomycota
- Class: Agaricomycetes
- Order: Polyporales
- Family: Polyporaceae
- Genus: Neodatronia; B.K.Cui, Hai J.Li & Y.C.Dai (2014)

Type species
- Neodatronia sinensis B.K.Cui, Hai J.Li & Y.C.Dai (2014)

Species
- N. gaoligongensis N. sinensis

Genus of fungi

Neodatronia is a genus of two species of poroid crust fungi in the family Polyporaceae. It was circumscribed in 2014 by Chinese mycologists Bao-Kai Cui, Hai-Jiao Li, and Yu-Cheng Dai as a segregate genus from Datronia. Neodatronia fungi differ microscopically from Datronia by having moderately to frequently branched skeleto-binding hyphae in the context, and by their somewhat smaller spores.

== Description ==
The fruit bodies of Neodatronia fungi are annual and crust-like. The pore surface colour ranges from white, to cream to pale brown. The pore surface, which becomes fragile when dries, consists of small pores with a round to angular shape. The subiculum is yellowish brown to cinnamon and has a corky texture. Neodatronia has a dimitic hyphal system (containing both generative and skeletal hyphae). The generative hyphae have clamp connections, while the skeletal hyphae are usually predominant, pale brown to brown, and moderately to frequently branched in subiculum and tramal. The branches of skeletal hyphae in the drama are typically well differentiated from the main part, and the tissues darken in the presence of a solution of KOH. Dendrohyphidia are present in the hymenium and the dissepiment edges. Cystidia are absent, but thin-walled cystidioles are usually present. The spores are cylindrical, hyaline, thin-walled, and smooth.

== Distribution and ecology ==
The type species of Neodatronia, N. sinensis, is found in Anhui, while N. gaoligongensis is found in Yunnan. Both species cause a white rot on angiosperm wood.
