= Podofomes =

Scientific classification
- Kingdom: Fungi
- Division: Basidiomycota
- Class: Agaricomycetes
- Order: Polyporales
- Family: Polyporaceae
- Genus: Podofomes; Pouzar (1966)

Type species
- Podofomes corrugis (Fr.) Pouzar (1966)

Species
- P. corrugis P. pyrenaicus P. trogii

Genus of fungi

Podofomes is a genus of polypore fungi in the family Polyporaceae. The genus, which was circumscribed in Zdeněk Pouzar in 1966, contains three species.
