= Porogramme =

Scientific classification
- Kingdom: Fungi
- Division: Basidiomycota
- Class: Agaricomycetes
- Order: Polyporales
- Family: Polyporaceae
- Genus: Porogramme (Pat.) Pat. (1900)

Type species
- Porogramme dussii (Pat.) Pat. (1900)

Synonyms
- Poria subgen. Porogramme Pat. (1899); Tinctoporia Murrill (1907)

Genus of fungi

Porogramme is a genus of fungi in the family Polyporaceae. Originally described as a subgenus of Poria by French mycologist Narcisse Théophile Patouillard in 1899, he promoted it to generic status in 1900. The genus name combines the Ancient Greek words πόρος ("pore") and γραμμή ("line" or "written character").

== Species ==
- Porogramme albocincta (Cooke & Massee) T.B.Gibertoni (2015)
- Porogramme aurantiotingens (Ellis & T.Macbr.) Pat. (1900)
- Porogramme carneopallens Pat. (1928)
- Porogramme dussii (Pat.) Pat. (1900)
- Porogramme graphica (Bres.) Pat. (1900)
- Porogramme lateritia (Pat.) Pat. (1900)
- Porogramme richeriae (Pat.) Pat. (1900)
