= Piloporia =

Scientific classification
- Kingdom: Fungi
- Division: Basidiomycota
- Class: Agaricomycetes
- Order: Polyporales
- Family: Polyporaceae
- Genus: Piloporia; Niemelä (1982)

Type species
- Piloporia sajanensis (Parmasto) Niemelä (1982)

Species
- P. indica P. sajanensis

Genus of fungi

Piloporia is a genus of two species of poroid fungi in the family Polyporaceae. The genus was circumscribed by Finnish mycologist Tuomo Niemelä in 1982, with P. sajanensis as the type species. The Indian species P. indica was added to the genus in 1988. P. sajanensis is found in Asia and Europe. In Asia, it is usually recorded on spruce, fir, and larch, while in Europe it is commonly found on spruce, but also on pine. Piloporia species cause a white rot in conifers and hardwoods.
