= Roseofavolus =

Scientific classification
- Kingdom: Fungi
- Division: Basidiomycota
- Class: Agaricomycetes
- Order: Polyporales
- Family: Polyporaceae
- Genus: Roseofavolus; T.Hatt. (2003)

Type species
- Roseofavolus eos (Corner) T.Hatt. (2003)

Synonyms
- Grifola eos Corner (1989)

Genus of fungi

Roseofavolus is a monotypic fungal genus in the family Polyporaceae. Circumscribed by Japanese mycologist Tsutomu Hattori in 2003, it contains the single poroid species Roseofavolus eos. This fungus was first described by English mycologist E.J.H. Corner as Grifola eos in 1989. It is found in the Malay Peninsula, Java, and Borneo.
