= Grammothelopsis =

Scientific classification
- Kingdom: Fungi
- Division: Basidiomycota
- Class: Agaricomycetes
- Order: Polyporales
- Family: Polyporaceae
- Genus: Grammothelopsis; Jülich (1982)

Type species
- Grammothelopsis macrospora (Ryvarden) Jülich (1982)

Genus of fungi

Grammothelopsis is a fungal genus in the family Polyporaceae. It was circumscribed in 1982 by Swiss mycologist Walter Jülich, with Grammothelopsis macrospora as the type species.

Species of Grammothelopsis have fruit bodies that are effused-reflexed, meaning they are crust-like with a margin that is extended and bent backwards. The pores are shallow and irregular. The spores are large, thick-walled, and display a variable dextrinoid reaction to Melzer's reagent.

== Species ==
As of June 2017, Index Fungorum accepts seven species of Grammothelopsis:

- Grammothelopsis asiatica Y.C.Dai & B.K.Cui (2011) – China
- Grammothelopsis bambusicola Ryvarden & de Meijer (2002) – Brazil
- Grammothelopsis incrustata A.David & Rajchenb. (1985)
- Grammothelopsis macrospora (Ryvarden) Jülich (1982) – Africa
- Grammothelopsis neotropica Robledo & Ryvarden (2007) – Peru
- Grammothelopsis puiggarii (Speg.) Rajchenb. & J.E.Wright (1987)
- Grammothelopsis subtropica B.K.Cui & C.L.Zhao (2013) – southern China

Grammothelopsis fungi occur mainly in tropical Africa and America, with two species reported from China.
