= Xerotus =

Scientific classification
- Domain: Eukaryota
- Kingdom: Fungi
- Division: Basidiomycota
- Class: Agaricomycetes
- Order: Polyporales
- Family: Polyporaceae
- Genus: Xerotus; Fr. (1828)

Type species
- Xerotus afer Fr. (1828)

Genus of fungi

Xerotus is a genus of fungi in the family Polyporaceae.

== Species ==
- Xerotus afer
- Xerotus atropurpureus
- Xerotus atrovirens
- Xerotus berteroi
- Xerotus changensis
- Xerotus cinnamomeus
- Xerotus drummondii
- Xerotus echinosporus
- Xerotus fuliginosus
- Xerotus javanicus
- Xerotus luteolus
- Xerotus madagascariensis
- Xerotus martinicensis
- Xerotus philippensis
- Xerotus poilanei
- Xerotus porteri
- Xerotus virgineus
