= Epithelopsis =

Scientific classification
- Kingdom: Fungi
- Division: Basidiomycota
- Class: Agaricomycetes
- Order: Polyporales
- Family: Polyporaceae
- Genus: Epithelopsis; Jülich (1976)

Type species
- Epithele fulva (G.Cunn.) Jülich (1976)

Species
- E. bosei E. fulva

Genus of fungi

Epithelopsis is a genus of toothed crust fungi in the family Polyporaceae. The genus was circumscribed by Swiss mycologist Walter Jülich in 1976 with E. fulva as the type species. E. bosei was added to the genus in 1989.
