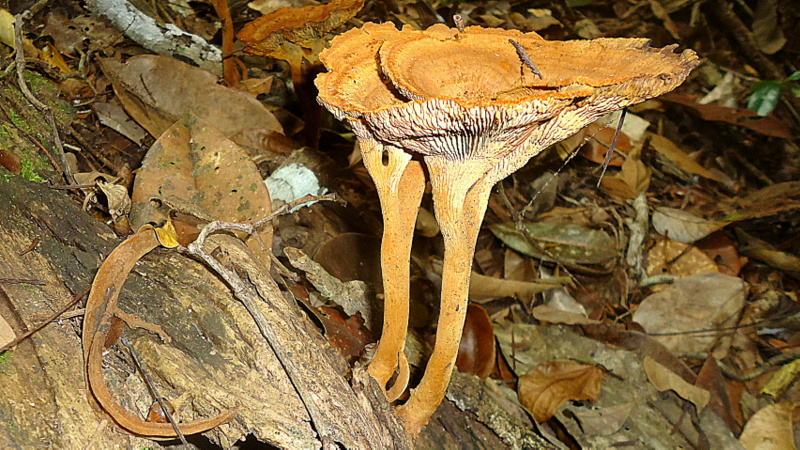

Scientific classification
- Kingdom: Fungi
- Division: Basidiomycota
- Class: Agaricomycetes
- Order: Polyporales
- Family: Polyporaceae
- Genus: Stiptophyllum; Ryvarden (1973)

Type species
- Stiptophyllum erubescens (Berk.) Ryvarden (1973)

Synonyms
- Daedalea erubescens Berk. (1840)

= Stiptophyllum =

Genus of fungi

Stiptophyllum is a fungal genus in the family Polyporaceae. It is a monotypic genus, containing the single species Stiptophyllum erubescens. The genus was circumscribed by Norwegian mycologist Leif Ryvarden in 1973. Stiptophyllum erubescens is found in tropical South America and causes brown rot of wood. Its fruit body has a stipe, which distinguishes it from the similar genus Gloeophyllum.
