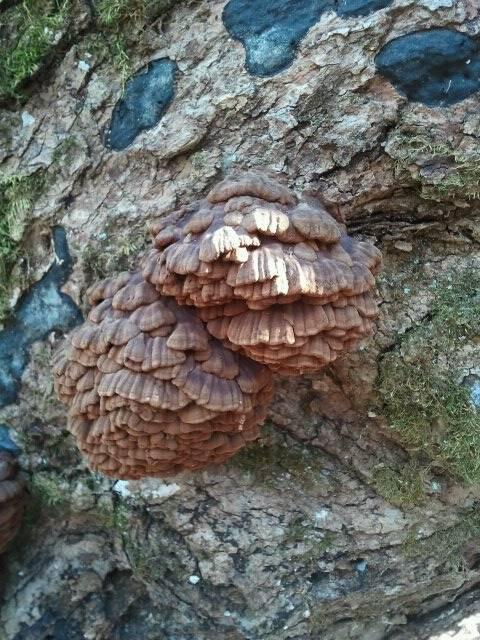

Scientific classification
- Kingdom: Fungi
- Division: Basidiomycota
- Class: Agaricomycetes
- Order: Polyporales
- Family: Polyporaceae
- Genus: Globifomes; Murrill (1904)

Type species
- Globifomes graveolens (Schwein.) Murrill (1904)

Synonyms
- Boletus graveolens Schwein. (1822); Polyporus graveolens (Schwein.) Fr. (1828); Polyporus botryoides Lév. (1846); Fomes graveolens (Schwein.) Cooke (1885); Scindalma graveolens (Schwein.) Kuntze (1898)

= Globifomes =

Genus of fungi

Globifomes is a fungal genus in the family Polyporaceae. It is a monotypic genus, containing the single North American species Globifomes graveolens, commonly known as sweet knot. This fungus is found fruiting singly or in groups on trunks or logs of hardwood trees, primarily oaks. The fruit body consists of a mass of small overlapping hoof-shaped caps arising from a common core. It is initially dull yellow-brown with tan petal-shaped margins, aging to dark brown.

== Taxonomy ==
Globifomes was circumscribed by William Alphonso Murrill in 1904. The type was originally described as Boletus graveolens by Lewis David de Schweinitz in 1822. The type specimen was collected in Georgia and sent to Schweinitz for identification. The generic name combines the Latin word globus ("globe") with the name Fomes.

Polyporus botryoides, described by Joseph-Henri Léveillé in 1846, was deemed by Murrill to be "probably not distinct" from Globifomes graveolens.

The common name of the fungus, sweet knot, refers to the odor of some specimens of freshly cut tissue. Most fruit bodies, however, do not have this odor.

== Description ==
Murrill described the characteristics of the genus as follows: "Hymenophore large, woody, encrusted, perennial, epixylous, compound; context ferruginous, pinky, tubes cylindrical, thick-walled, stratose; spores ovoid, smooth, ferruginous."

The fruit bodies of the fungus measure between 5–20.5 cm (2.0–8.1 in) wide and tall, and consist of small overlapping stipe-less caps originating from a central core. Caps have a leathery to rigid texture with a slightly velvety surface and radial wrinkles on the edges. Adjacent caps can be fused together and have petal-shaped projecting margins. Initially dull yellow-brown with a tan margin, they mature to become dark brown to greyish black in age. The fibrous and tough flesh is yellowish brown and up to 6 mm (0.24 in) thick. The pore surface, initially purplish gray before turning dark grayish brown, comprises small circular pores numbering 3–5 per millimeter.

Spores produced by the fungus are cylindrical, thin walled, hyaline (translucent), and measure 10–14 by 3–4.5 μm. They are inamyloid. Globifomes produces a brown spore print.

== Habitat and distribution ==
Globifomes causes a white rot in the heartwood of broadleaf trees. The fungus is most commonly found in oak (Murrill noted a preference for water oak), but it also occurs on beech. Fruit bodies grow on both living and dead trees.
