= Flammeopellis =

Scientific classification
- Kingdom: Fungi
- Division: Basidiomycota
- Class: Agaricomycetes
- Order: Polyporales
- Family: Polyporaceae
- Genus: Flammeopellis; Y.C.Dai, B.K.Cui & C.L.Zhao (2014)

Type species
- Flammeopellis bambusicola Y.C.Dai, B.K.Cui & C.L.Zhao (2014)

Genus of fungi

Flammeopellis is a fungal genus in the family Polyporaceae. It is a monotypic genus, containing the single species Flammeopellis bambusicola, found in Sichuan, China. Flammeopellis was circumscribed by Chinese mycologists Chang-Lin Zhao, Bao-Kai Cui and Yu-Cheng Dai in 2014.
