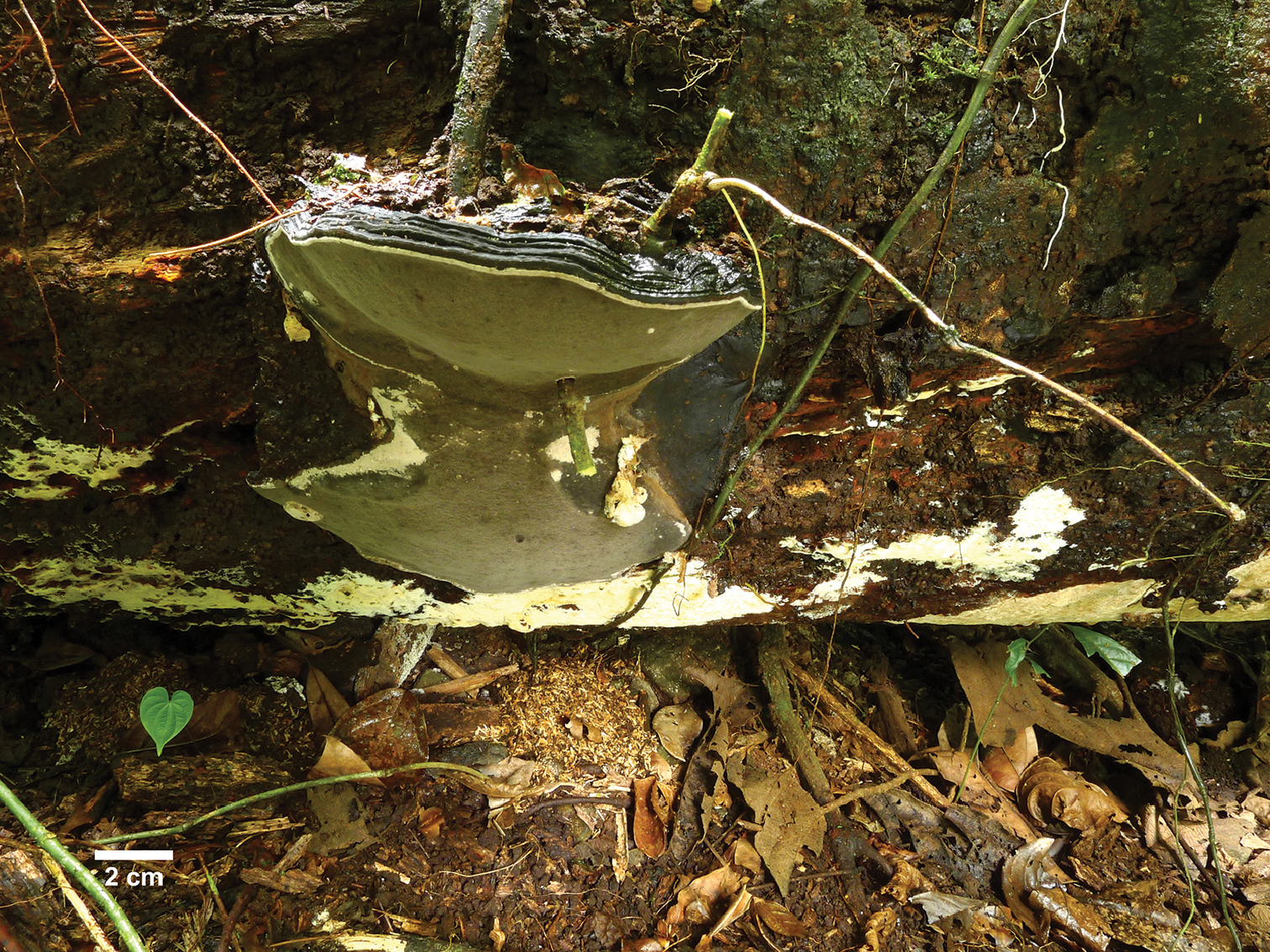
- N. melanoporus

Scientific classification
- Domain: Eukaryota
- Kingdom: Fungi
- Division: Basidiomycota
- Class: Agaricomycetes
- Order: Polyporales
- Family: Polyporaceae
- Genus: Nigrofomes; Murrill (1904)

Type species
- Nigrofomes melanoporus (Mont.) Murrill (1904)

Species
- N. melanoporus; N. nigrivineus; N. sinomelanoporus; N. submelanoporus

= Nigrofomes =

Genus of fungi

Nigrofomes is a genus of fungi in the family Polyporaceae. It was circumscribed by mycologist William Alphonso Murrill in 1904 with N. melanoporus as the type species. This fungus, first described as Polyporus melanoporus from collections made in Cuba, is common in tropical America. N. nigrivineus, found in Papua New Guinea, was added to the genus in 2013 and N. sinomelanoporus from China was added in 2018.

The genus name combines the Latin word niger ("black") with the name Fomes.

== Description ==
Murrill described the characteristics of the genus as follows: "Hymenophore large, perennial, epixylous, sessile; context woody, purple, tubes cylindrical, stratose, thick-walled, black; pores ovoid, smooth, hyaline." He noted that Nigrofomes was distinguished from similar genera by its purple context and black tubes.

== Chemistry ==
Drimane-type sesquiterpenes called nigrofomins have been isolated from the fruit bodies of Nigrofomes melanoporus.
