= Rubroporus =

Scientific classification
- Kingdom: Fungi
- Division: Basidiomycota
- Class: Agaricomycetes
- Order: Polyporales
- Family: Polyporaceae
- Genus: Rubroporus; Log.-Leite, Ryvarden & Groposo (2002)

Type species
- Rubroporus carneoporis Log.-Leite, Ryvarden & Groposo (2002)

Species
- R. aurantiaca R. carneoporis

Genus of fungi

Rubroporus is a small genus of neotropical fungi in the family Polyporaceae. The type species, R. carneoporis, is found in Brazil where it causes a white rot on Alchornea triplinervia. Rubroporus aurantiaca, found in Belize, was added to the genus in 2007.
