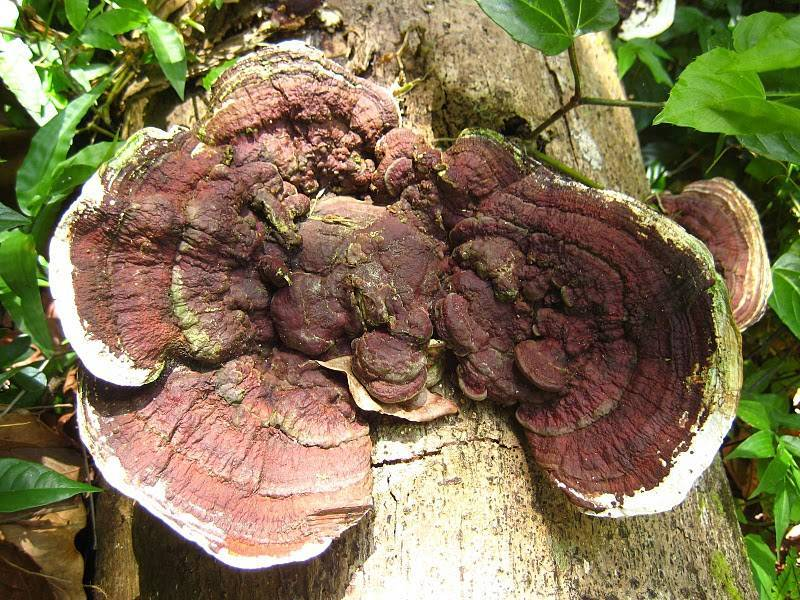

Scientific classification
- Kingdom: Fungi
- Division: Basidiomycota
- Class: Agaricomycetes
- Order: Polyporales
- Family: Polyporaceae
- Genus: Earliella; Murrill (1905)

Type species
- Earliella scabrosa (Pers.) Gilb. & Ryvarden (1985)

Synonyms
- Fomes scabrosus (Pers.) Cooke (1885); Scindalma scabrosum (Pers.) Kuntze (1898); Pelloporus scabrosus (Pers.) Bondartsev (1961); Trametes scabrosa (Pers.) G.Cunn. (1965); Ischnoderma scabrosum (Pers.) Zmitr. (2001)

= Earliella =

Genus of fungi

Earliella is a fungal genus in the family Polyporaceae. It is a monotypic genus, containing the single species Earliella scabrosa. It is found in Hainan.

== Taxonomy ==
The genus was circumscribed by William Alphonso Murrill in 1905 with Earliella cubensis as the type species. The type collection was made in Cuba by Murrill and Franklin Sumner Earle, for whom the genus is named. Murrill also noted the presence of the fungus in Nicaragua, Mexico, and Jamaica. In a study of species described by Murrill, Leif Ryvarden determined that Earliella cubensis was the same species as Trametes scabrosus (Pers.) Cunn., a possibility mentioned by Murrill himself. Ryvarden and Robert Lee Gilbertson transferred Trametes scabrosus to Earliella in 1985.

== Chemistry ==
The chemical constituents and antioxidant activity of the essential oil extracted from fruit bodies of Earliella scabrosa has been characterized. The chemical 3-methyl-2-butanol is present in the highest concentration, accounting for nearly 50%. This is followed by diacetone alcohol (10.57%), azulene (8.01%), toluene (4.36%), palmitic acid (4.01%) and linoleic acid (4.01%).

== Pathogenicity ==
In 2017, a case report documented E. scabrosa as the cause of cutaneous fungal septic emboli in an immunocompromised child, which, despite antifungal treatment, later resulted in death. A year later, the fungus was determined to be the cause of a human eye infection (endophthalmitis) resulting after intraocular lens implantation. It was successfully treated with a vitrectomy.
