= Cerarioporia =

Scientific classification
- Kingdom: Fungi
- Division: Basidiomycota
- Class: Agaricomycetes
- Order: Polyporales
- Family: Polyporaceae
- Genus: Cerarioporia; F.Wu, L.W.Zhou & Jing Si (2016)

Type species
- Cerarioporia cystidiata F.Wu, L.W.Zhou & Jing Si (2016)

Genus of fungi

Cerarioporia is a fungal genus in the family Polyporaceae. It is a monotypic genus, containing the single species Cerarioporia cystidiata, a wood-decaying poroid crust fungus found in tropical China. Cerarioporia resembles fungi placed in the genus Antrodia, but can be distinguished by its waxy to resinous fruit bodies, and microscopically by the thick-walled, encrusted cystidia. Additionally, Cerarioporia causes a white rot, while Antrodia are brown-rot fungi.

Cerarioporia is a member of the "core polyporoid clade", a phylogenetic grouping of fungi that is roughly equivalent to the family Polyporaceae. The generic name Cerarioporia, derived from Latin roots, refers to the waxy tube layer that is characteristic of this fungus.
