= Hymenogramme =

Scientific classification
- Kingdom: Fungi
- Division: Basidiomycota
- Class: Agaricomycetes
- Order: Polyporales
- Family: Polyporaceae
- Genus: Hymenogramme; Mont. & Berk. (1844)

Type species
- Hymenogramme javensis Mont. & Berk. (1844)

Genus of fungi

Hymenogramme is a fungal genus in the family Polyporaceae. It is a monotypic genus, containing the single species Hymenogramme javensis. The generic name combines the Ancient Greek words ὑμήν ("membrane") and γραμμή ("line" or "written character").
