= Sparsitubus =

Scientific classification
- Kingdom: Fungi
- Division: Basidiomycota
- Class: Agaricomycetes
- Order: Polyporales
- Family: Polyporaceae
- Genus: Sparsitubus; L.W.Hsu & J.D.Zhao (1980)

Type species
- Sparsitubus nelumbiformis L.W.Hsu & J.D.Zhao (1980)

Genus of fungi

Sparsitubus is a fungal genus in the family Polyporaceae. It is a monotypic genus, containing the single species Sparsitubus nelumbiformis, found in Hainan and Yunnan, China. Molecular analysis suggests that Sparsitubus is in a clade of white rot polypores and may be closely related to the Ganodermataceae.
