= Pseudofavolus =

Scientific classification
- Domain: Eukaryota
- Kingdom: Fungi
- Division: Basidiomycota
- Class: Agaricomycetes
- Order: Polyporales
- Family: Polyporaceae
- Genus: Pseudofavolus; Pat. (1900)

Type species
- Pseudofavolus miquelii (Mont.) Pat. (1900)

Genus of fungi

Pseudofavolus is a genus of fungi in the family Polyporaceae. The genus was circumscribed by French mycologist Narcisse Théophile Patouillard in 1900. The generic name combines the Ancient Greek word ψευδής ("false") with the genus name Favolus.

== Species ==
- Pseudofavolus bipindiensis (Henn.) Pat. (1914)
- Pseudofavolus miquelii (Mont.) Pat. (1900) – Dominican Republic; Sierra Leone
- Pseudofavolus nigrus Ryvarden (1987)
- Pseudofavolus orinocensis (Pat. & Gaillard) Ryvarden (1972)
- Pseudofavolus polygrammus (Mont.) G.Cunn. (1965)
- Pseudofavolus pulchellus (Lév.) G.Cunn. (1965) – Philippines
