= Tinctoporellus =

Scientific classification
- Kingdom: Fungi
- Division: Basidiomycota
- Class: Agaricomycetes
- Order: Polyporales
- Family: Polyporaceae
- Genus: Tinctoporellus; Ryvarden (1979)

Type species
- Tinctoporellus epimiltinus (Berk. & Broome) Ryvarden (1979)

Species
- T. bubalinus T. epimiltinus T. hinnuleus T. isabellinus

Genus of fungi

Tinctoporellus is a genus of fungi in the family Polyporaceae. Species in the genus produce crust-like fruit bodies with pore-containing surfaces. The type species, T. epimiltinus, grows on the wood of angiosperms and is widespread in distribution. Tinctoporellus was circumscribed by Norwegian mycologist Leif Ryvarden in 1979. He suggested that Antrodia was closely related based on morphological similarities.

The Brazilian species Tinctoporellus isabellinus was added to the genus in 2003, while T. bubalinus and T. hinnuleus, found in China, were reported as new to science in 2012.
