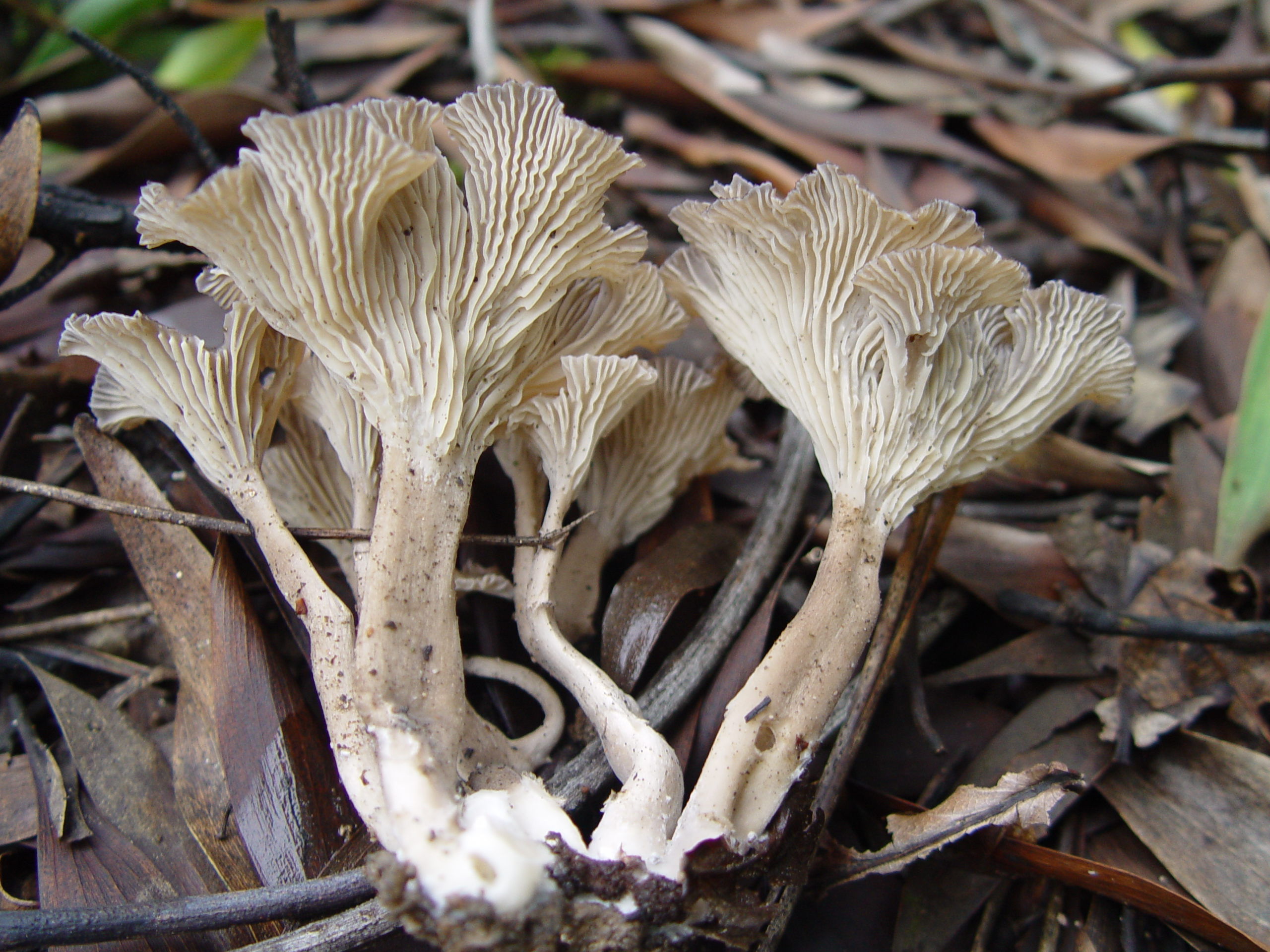

Scientific classification
- Kingdom: Fungi
- Division: Basidiomycota
- Class: Agaricomycetes
- Order: Polyporales
- Family: Polyporaceae
- Genus: Faerberia; Pouzar (1981)
- Species: F. carbonaria

Binomial name
- Faerberia carbonaria (Alb. & Schwein.) Pouzar (1981)

Synonyms
- Merulius carbonarius Alb. & Schwein. (1805); Cantharellus umbonatus var. carbonarius (Alb. & Schwein.) Fr. (1821); Merulius umbonatus var. carbonarius (Alb. & Schwein.) Fr. (1821); Merulius umbonatus subsp. carbonarius (Alb. & Schwein.) Pers. (1825); Cantharellus carbonarius (Alb. & Schwein.) Fr. (1874); Geopetalum carbonarium (Alb. & Schwein.) Pat. (1887); Lentinus carbonarius (Alb. & Schwein.) Kühner (1980)

= Faerberia =

Genus of fungi

Faerberia
- Mycological characteristics
- Gills on hymenium
- Cap is umbilicate
- Hymenium is decurrent
- Stipe is bare
- Spore print is white
- Ecology is saprotrophic
- Edibility is edible

Faerberia is a fungal genus in the family Polyporaceae. It is a monotypic genus, containing the single species Faerberia carbonaria, which is commonly known as the firesite funnel due to its habitat of burned soil.

== Taxonomy ==
This species was originally described in 1805 as Merulius carbonarius by botanists Johannes Baptista von Albertini and Lewis David de Schweinitz. Faerberia was circumscribed in 1981 by Czech mycologist Zdeněk Pouzar.

== Description ==
Faerberia carbonaria is a small funnel mushroom with tough, grey-white flesh. Although it belongs to Polyporaceae, it has gills. It is a somewhat rare, monotypic, gilled polypore with a habitat of burned soil. The cap diameter is 0.5–2 cm (0.2–0.8 in). It is funnel shaped and umbilicate, smooth or lightly fibrous texture. The cap margin is usually scalloped and rolled in. The stem is 1.5–7 cm (0.6–2.8 in). It is often curved, irregular, and fused together above the swollen base which sometimes displays white rhizoids. The gills are grey, growing paler towards the stipe. They are thick, decurrent, and usually with significant forking. The spore print is white. The spores are ellipsoid, smooth, non-amyloid. 8–9.5 x 4.5–5.5 micrometer (μm). The taste is indefinite and mild. The smell is faint and indefinite.

== Habitat and distribution ==
F. carbonaria grows on burned soil with woodland fire sites as its most common habitat. It may grow in small trooping groups or be found individually, but it is uncommon to find it through summer and autumn.

== Relation to humans ==
Whilst it is an edible mushroom, it is regarded as a poor choice due to its tough texture, mild taste, and general rarity.
