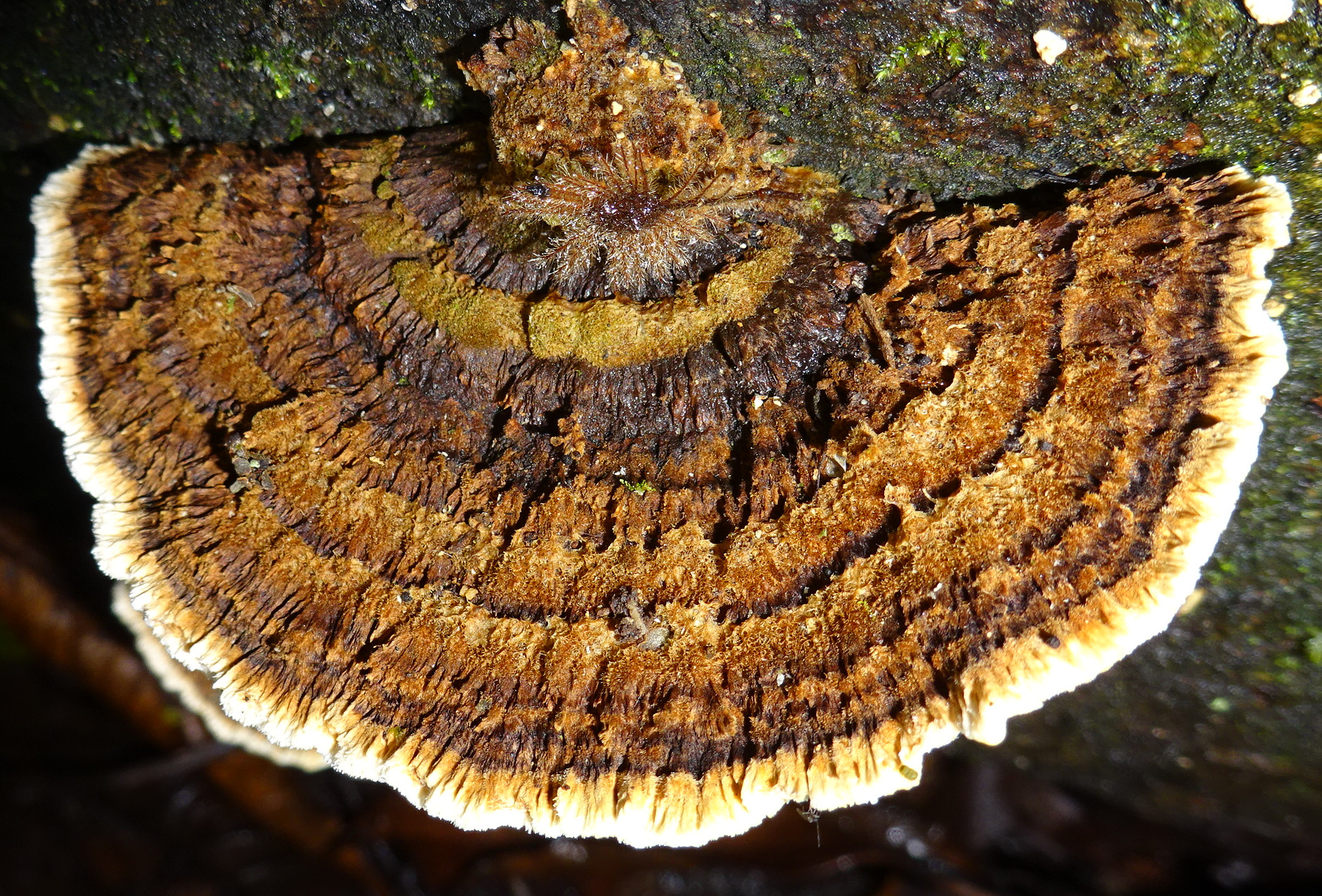
- Funalia caperata

Scientific classification
- Kingdom: Fungi
- Division: Basidiomycota
- Class: Agaricomycetes
- Order: Polyporales
- Family: Polyporaceae
- Genus: Funalia; Pat. (1900)

Type species
- Funalia mons-veneris (Jungh.) Pat. (1900)

Species
- F. argentea F. aspera F. caperata F. floccosa F. funalis F. sanguinaria F. subgallica F. thujae

= Funalia =

Genus of fungi

Funalia is a fungal genus in the family Polyporaceae. The genus was circumscribed by French mycologist Narcisse Théophile Patouillard in 1900. He made Funalia mons-veneris the type species; this fungus was originally described as Polyporus mons-veneris by Franz Wilhelm Junghuhn in 1838. The generic name is derived from the Latin funalis ("made of rope").

== Species ==
- Funalia argentea (Lloyd) D.A.Reid (1973)
- Funalia aspera (Jungh.) Zmitr. & Malysheva (2013)
- Funalia caperata (Berk.) Zmitr. & Malysheva (2013)
- Funalia floccosa (Jungh.) Zmitr. & Malysheva (2013)
- Funalia funalis (Fr.) Pat. (1900)
- Funalia sanguinaria (Klotzsch) Zmitr. & Malysheva (2013)
- Funalia subgallica Hai J.Li & S.H.He (2016) – China
- Funalia thujae (J.D.Zhao) Y.C.Dai & H.S.Yuan (2010) – China
