= Cellulariella =

Scientific classification
- Kingdom: Fungi
- Division: Basidiomycota
- Class: Agaricomycetes
- Order: Polyporales
- Family: Polyporaceae
- Genus: Cellulariella; Zmitr. Malysheva (2014)

Type species
- Cellulariella acuta Zmitr. Malysheva (2014)

Species
- Cellulariella acuta Cellulariella warnieri

Genus of fungi

Cellulariella is a genus of fungi belonging to the family Polyporaceae. It was first documented in 2014 by Ivan V. Zmitrovich and Vera F. Malysheva. It is made up of two species: Cellulariella acuta and Cellulariella warnieri.
