= Yuchengia =

Scientific classification
- Kingdom: Fungi
- Division: Basidiomycota
- Class: Agaricomycetes
- Order: Polyporales
- Family: Polyporaceae
- Genus: Yuchengia; B.K.Cui & Steffen (2013)

Type species
- Yuchengia narymica (Pilát) B.K.Cui, C.L.Zhao & K.T.Steffen (2013)

Synonyms
- Trametes narymica Pilát (1936); Poria elongata Overh. (1942); Perenniporia elongata Domański (1973); Poria amylohypha (Ryvarden & Gilb.) Ginns (1984); Perenniporia amylohypha Ryvarden & Gilb. (1984); Perenniporia narymica (Pilát) Pouzar (1984)

Genus of fungi

Yuchengia is a fungal genus in the family Polyporaceae. It is a monotypic genus, containing the single species Yuchengia narymica, a crust fungus formerly placed in the genus Perenniporia and originally described as Trametes narymica by Czech mycologist Albert Pilát.

== Description ==
Yuchengia narymica has a cream to yellowish buff pore surface with angular pores. The hyphal system is dimitic (containing both generative and skeletal hyphae), and the generative hyphae have clamp connections. Similar to Perenniporia, Yuchengia has thick-walled and cyanophilous spores. Yuchengia is distinguished from Perenniporia in its acyanophilous and amyloid skeletal hyphae that dissolve in KOH, and non-dextrinoid spores.
