= Thermophymatospora =

Scientific classification
- Kingdom: Fungi
- Division: Basidiomycota
- Class: Agaricomycetes
- Order: Polyporales
- Family: Polyporaceae
- Genus: Thermophymatospora; Udagawa, Awao & Abdullah (1986)

Type species
- Thermophymatospora fibuligera Udagawa, Awao & Abdullah (1986)

Genus of fungi

Thermophymatospora is a monotypic fungal genus in the family Polyporaceae containing the single species Thermophymatospora fibuligera, a basidiomycetous hyphomycete. Both the genus and species were described as new in 1986. The fungus was originally isolated from cultivated soil at a date palm plantation in Iraq. It has conidia that are brown, spherical, and relatively large (typically 20–24 μm). Its hyphae has clamp connections. The fungus has a growth temperature range of 17–48 °C (63–118 °F), with an optimum between 35 and 40 °C (95 and 104 °F).

The specific epithet fibuligera, from the Latin for "clamp-bearing", refers to the characteristic presence of clamp connections in the hyphae.
