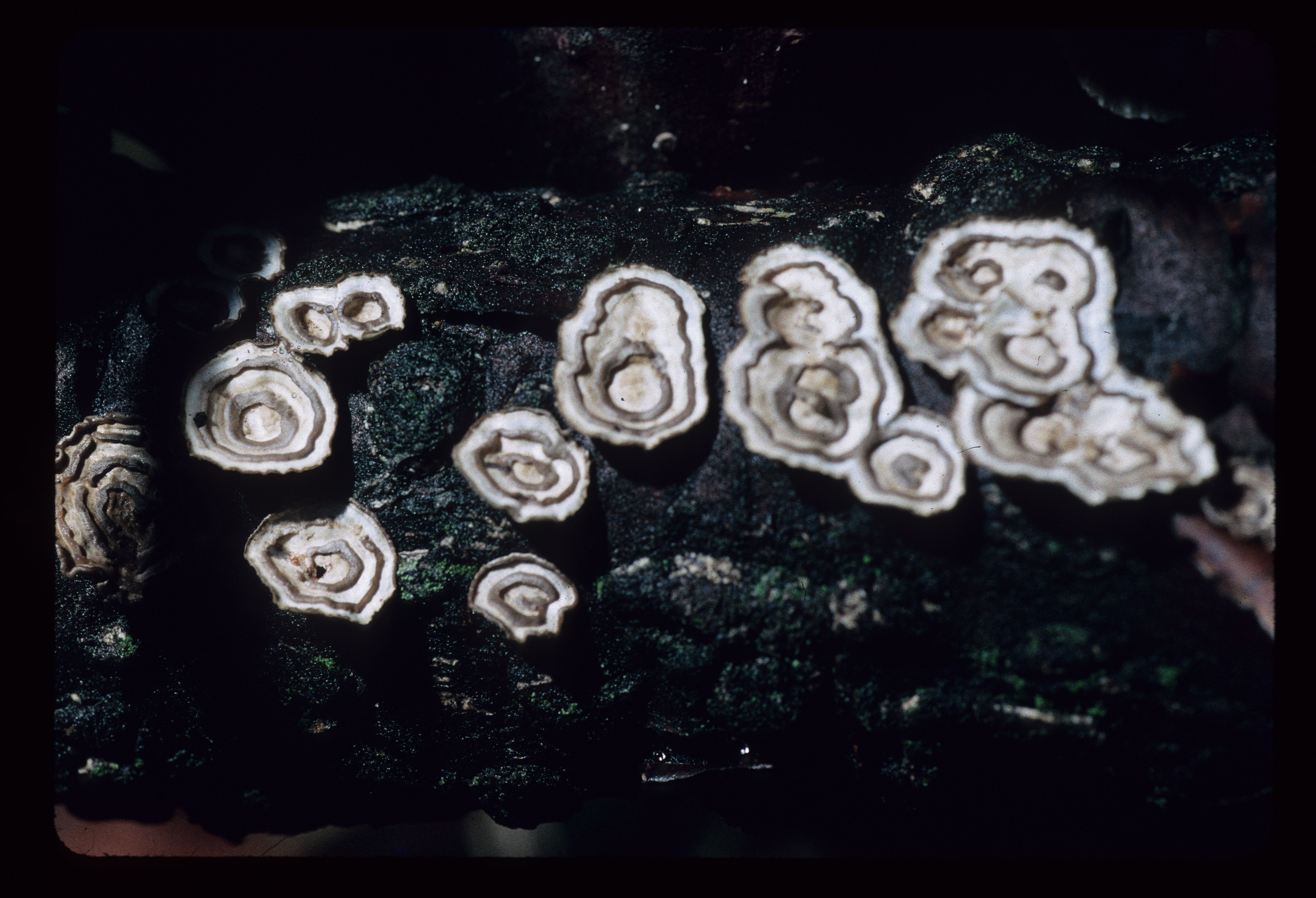
- Poronidulus conchifer

Scientific classification
- Kingdom: Fungi
- Division: Basidiomycota
- Class: Agaricomycetes
- Order: Polyporales
- Family: Polyporaceae
- Genus: Poronidulus; Murrill (1904)

Type species
- Poronidulus conchifer (Schwein.) Murrill (1904)

Synonyms
- Boletus conchifer Schwein. (1822); Polyporus conchifer (Schwein.) Fr. (1828); Polystictus conchifer (Schwein.) Sacc. (1888); Microporus conchifer (Schwein.) Kuntze (1898); Trametes conchifer (Schwein.) Pilát (1939); Coriolus conchifer (Schwein.) G.Cunn. (1949)

= Poronidulus =

Genus of fungi

Poronidulus is a fungal genus in the family Polyporaceae. It is a monotypic genus, and contains the single polypore species Poronidulus conchifer, found in North America. The genus was circumscribed by American mycologist William Alphonso Murrill in 1904. The generic name, which combines the Ancient Greek word πόρος ("pore") with the Latin word nidulus ("small nest"), refers to the superficial similarity of the cup-shaped Poronidulus fruit bodies with those of the genus Nidularia. A second species, Poronidulus bivalvis, found in Bogor, was placed in the genus by Franz Xaver Rudolf von Höhnel in 1914. The actual identity of this taxon, however, is uncertain.

== Description ==
Murrill described the characteristic of genus Poronidulus as follows: "Hymenophore annual, tough, sessile, epixylous, at first sterile and cup-like, the fertile portion developing from the sterile; context white, fibrous, tubes short, thin-walled, mouths polygonal; spores ellipsoidal, smooth, hyaline."

The cup-like shape of the fruit bodies allows the spores of the fungus to be disseminated when hit by drops of rain, a dispersal method similar to that of the bird's nest fungi. P. conchifer is inedible.
