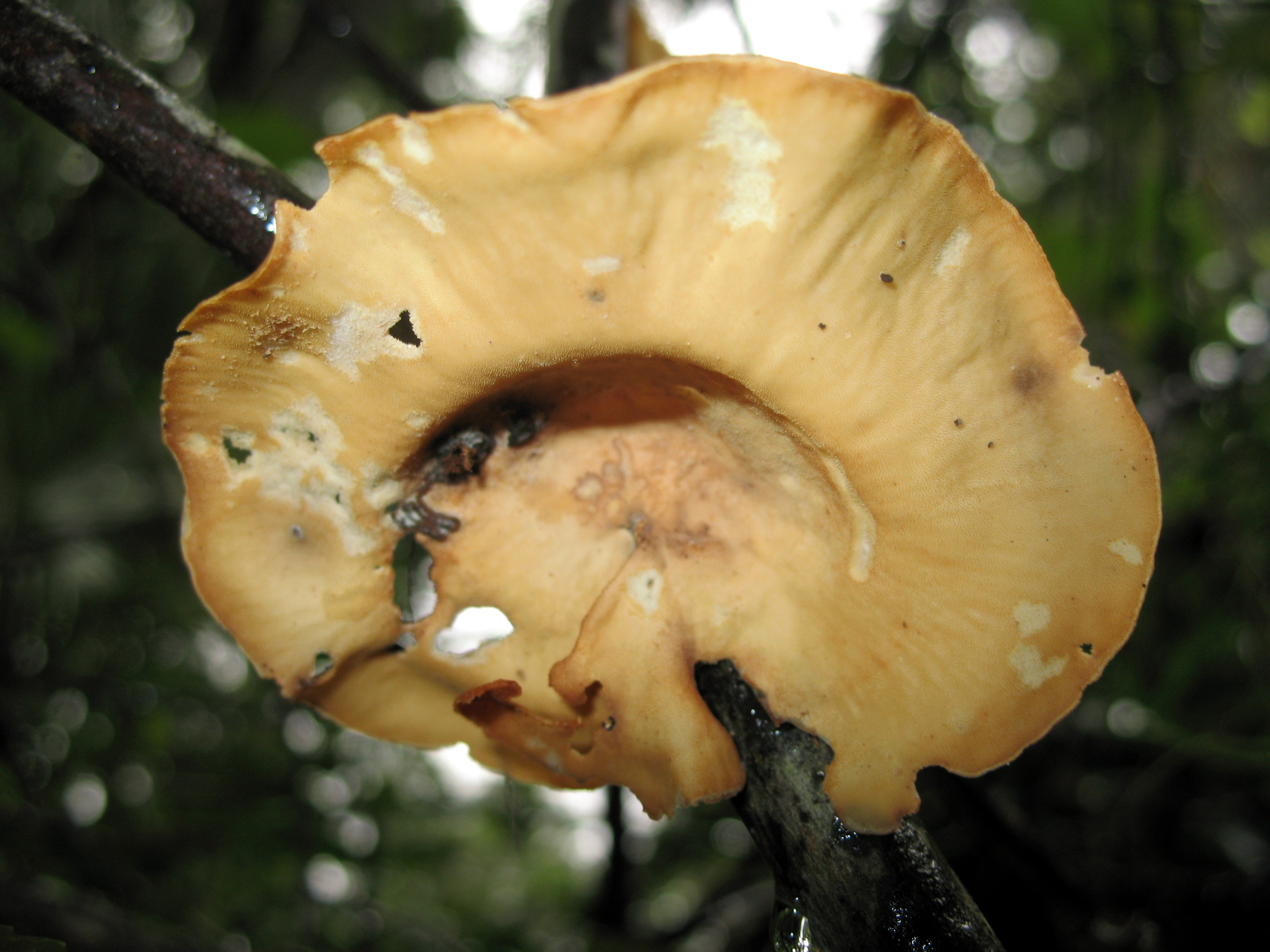
- Mycobonia flava

Scientific classification
- Kingdom: Fungi
- Division: Basidiomycota
- Class: Agaricomycetes
- Order: Polyporales
- Family: Polyporaceae
- Genus: Mycobonia; Pat. (1894)

Type species
- Mycobonia flava (Sw.) Fr. (1894)

Species
- M. brunneoleuca M. flava M. winkleri

Synonyms
- Hirneola Fr. (1825); Grandinioides Banker (1906)

= Mycobonia =

Genus of fungi

Mycobonia is a genus of tooth fungi in the family Polyporaceae. It was once placed in the family Gloeophyllaceae, but Phylogenetic analysis and some microscopic characters place Mycobonia within the Polyporaceae, even making it synonymous with Polyporus. Mycobonia was circumscribed by French mycologist Narcisse Théophile Patouillard in 1894, with M. flava (then classified as a species of Hydnum) as the type species.
