= Phaeotrametes =

Scientific classification
- Kingdom: Fungi
- Division: Basidiomycota
- Class: Agaricomycetes
- Order: Polyporales
- Family: Polyporaceae
- Genus: Phaeotrametes; Lloyd ex J.E.Wright (1966)

Type species
- Phaeotrametes decipiens (Berk.) J.E.Wright (1966)

Synonyms
- Hexagonia decipiens Berk. (1845); Scenidium decipiens (Berk.) Kuntze (1898); Polyporus decipiens (Berk.) Lloyd (1915); Trametes drummondii G.Cunn. (1950); Osmoporus decipiens (Berk.) G.Cunn. (1965); Polyporus perparadoxus Speg. (1881); Poria perparadoxa (Speg.) Sacc. (1888); Trametes praetervisa Bres. (1920)

Genus of fungi

Phaeotrametes is a monotypic fungal genus in the family Polyporaceae. It contains the single poroid species Phaeotrametes decipiens, which is widely distributed in the Southern Hemisphere.

== Taxonomy ==
The genus was originally informally suggested by American mycologist Curtis Gates Lloyd in 1915 to contain the Australian species then known as Polyporus decipiens. Lloyd recognized that the fungus could not be referred to existing genera; its coloured spores and pore structure excluded it from Hexagonia and Trametes. Jorge E. Wright emended the generic description and published Phaeotrametes validly in 1966.

In 2003, Popoff proposed the creation of the family Phaeotrametaceae to contain the fungus, but this was not validly published according to nomenclatural practice as it lacked a Latin description—a requirement at the time. Marcin Piątek published the name validly a couple of years later.

== Description ==
Phaeotrametes decipiens has brownish, fan-shaped fruit bodies. It has a trimitic hyphal system–containing generative, skeletal, and binding hyphae. Its spores are large, truncate, and thick-walled, and inamyloid (unreactive with Melzer's reagent). A characteristic feature of Phaeotrametes is the presence of chlamydosporic fruit bodies that occur alongside the normal fruit bodies.
