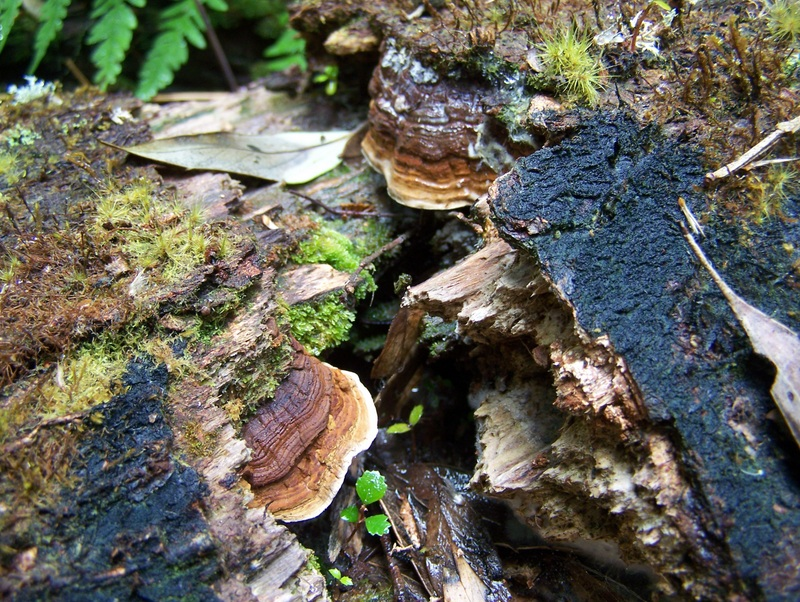
- In the Upper Florentine Valley

Scientific classification
- Domain: Eukaryota
- Kingdom: Fungi
- Division: Basidiomycota
- Class: Agaricomycetes
- Order: Polyporales
- Family: Polyporaceae
- Genus: Australoporus; P.K.Buchanan & Ryvarden (1988)
- Species: A. tasmanicus

Binomial name
- Australoporus tasmanicus (Berk.) P.K.Buchanan & Ryvarden (1988)

Synonyms
- List: Polyporus tasmanicus Berk. (1860); Fomes tasmanicus (Berk.) Cooke (1885); Scindalma tasmanicum (Berk.) Kuntze (1898); Fomitopsis tasmanica (Berk.) G.Cunn. (1949); Ungulina tasmanica (Berk.) R.Heim (1951); Heterobasidion tasmanicum (Berk.) G.Cunn. (1965); Trichaptum tasmanicum (Berk.) Teixeira (1994)

= Australoporus =

Genus of fungi

Australoporus is a genus of fungi in the family Polyporaceae. It is a monotypic genus, containing the single species Australoporus tasmanicus, found in Tasmania. The genus was circumscribed in 1988 by mycologists Peter Buchanan and Leif Ryvarden to contain the species then known as Polyporus tasmanicus.
