= Colospora =

Scientific classification
- Kingdom: Fungi
- Division: Basidiomycota
- Class: Agaricomycetes
- Order: Polyporales
- Family: Polyporaceae
- Genus: Colospora; Miettinen & Spirin (2015)

Type species
- Colospora andalasii Miettinen & Spirin (2015)

Species
- C. andalasii C. citrispora

Genus of fungi

Colospora is a genus of two species of crust fungi in the family Polyporaceae. It was circumscribed in 2015 by mycologists Otto Miettinen and Viacheslav Spirin with C. andalasii as the type species. The generic name is derived from the Latin word colus (meaning distaff), and refer to the shape of the spores.

== Description ==
The fruit bodies of Colospora species are crust-like with tiny spines. The hyphal system is dimitic (containing both generative and skeletal hyphae), and there are clamp connections present in the generative hyphae. Short-branched dendrohyphidia are common in the hymenium, and the apex of the spines are sterile. The spores are relatively large, thin walled, and biapiculate.
