= Amyloporiella =

Scientific classification
- Kingdom: Fungi
- Division: Basidiomycota
- Class: Agaricomycetes
- Order: Polyporales
- Family: Polyporaceae
- Genus: Amyloporiella; A. David & Tortič

Type species
- Amyloporiella flava A. David & Tortič

Genus of fungi

Amyloporiella is a genus of fungi in the family Polyporaceae.
