= Leiotrametes =

Scientific classification
- Kingdom: Fungi
- Division: Basidiomycota
- Class: Agaricomycetes
- Order: Polyporales
- Family: Polyporaceae
- Genus: Leiotrametes; Welti & Courtec. (2012)

Type species
- Leiotrametes lactinea (Berk.) Welti & Courtec. (2012)

Species
- L. lactinea L. menziesii

Genus of fungi

Leiotrametes is a genus of two species of poroid white rot fungi in the family Polyporaceae. The genus was circumscribed in 2012 to accommodate Leiotrametes menziesii, and the type species, L. lactinea. Both species were formerly placed in the genus Trametes.

== Description ==
The upper surface of the caps of Leiotrametes fungi are smooth and dull. They are attached to the substrate by a stem-like base, sometimes in the form of a disc; this feature is however absent in L. lactinea, which is sessile. The pores on the cap underside are regular, sometimes becoming daedalean (maze-like) to lamellate (gill-like). Leiotrametes lacks the parietal crystals in the hyphae that are found in the similar genera Artolenzites, Pycnoporus, and are sometimes present in Trametes.

== Distribution ==
Leiotrametes lactinea has a pantropical distribution, and has been found in the Eastern USA, where it is assumed to be a recent colonization. Leiotrametes menziesii is found in the paleotropics and in the neotropics. It was reported from Mexico in 2012. A third Leiotrametes species has been collected from French Guiana, but has not yet been formally described as a new species.
