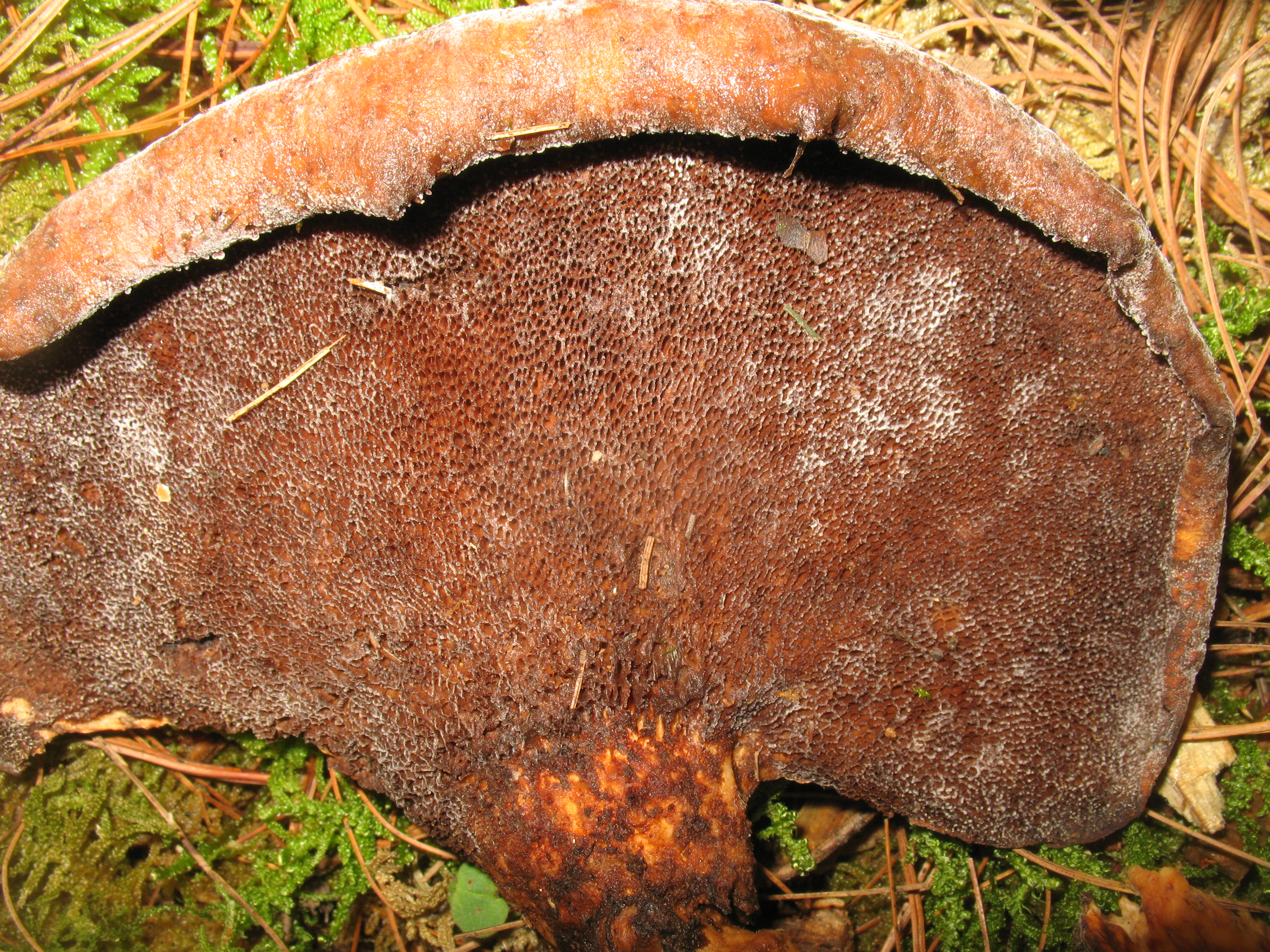
- Echinochaete brachypora

Scientific classification
- Kingdom: Fungi
- Division: Basidiomycota
- Class: Agaricomycetes
- Order: Polyporales
- Family: Polyporaceae
- Genus: Echinochaete; D.A.Reid (1963)

Type species
- Echinochaete megalopora (Mont.) D.A.Reid (1963)

Species
- E. brachypora; E. cinnamomeosquamulosa; E. maximipora; E. ruficeps; E. russiceps

Synonyms
- Dendrochaete G.Cunn. (1965)

= Echinochaete =

Genus of fungi

Echinochaete is a genus of fungi in the family Polyporaceae. Circumscribed by English mycologist Derek Reid in 1963, the genus is widespread in tropical regions and contains five species.

== Description ==
Fruit bodies of Echinochaete fungi are annual. They are fan- or spoon-shaped and attached to the substrate by a short stipe. The upper surface of the cap is initially velutinous–covered with short, dense, silky, upright hairs, particularly near its base. In age the surface becomes smoother. Its colour is whitish to pinkish, later becoming reddish to brown. The pores on the cap underside have an angular to hexagonal shape.

Echinochaete has a dimitic hyphal system, containing both generative and skeletal hyphae. The generative hyphae are hyaline, thin-walled, and have clamp connections. The skeletal hyphae are thick-walled, with a golden to rusty colour. Hyphae in the context have a strong dextrinoid reaction. They feature spiny setae-like structures in the cap surface, the hymenium, and the walls of the tubes. Spores are cylindrical to ellipsoidal, hyaline, smooth, and thin-walled. The dextrinoid reactivity of the context and the setae-like elements distinguish this genus from Polyporus.

== Species ==
- Echinochaete brachypora (Mont.) Ryvarden (1978)
- Echinochaete cinnamomeosquamulosa (Henn.) D.A.Reid (1963)
- Echinochaete maximipora Sotome & T.Hatt. (2009)
- Echinochaete ruficeps (Berk. & Broome) Ryvarden (1972)
- Echinochaete russiceps (Berk. & Broome) D.A.Reid (1963)
