= Laetifomes =

Scientific classification
- Kingdom: Fungi
- Division: Basidiomycota
- Class: Agaricomycetes
- Order: Polyporales
- Family: Polyporaceae
- Genus: Laetifomes; T.Hatt. (2001)

Type species
- Laetifomes flammans (Corner) T.Hatt. (2001)

Synonyms
- Rigidoporus flammans Corner (1987)

Genus of fungi

Laetifomes is a fungal genus in the family Polyporaceae. It is a monotypic genus, containing the single species Laetifomes flammans.
