= Cryptomphalina =

Scientific classification
- Kingdom: Fungi
- Division: Basidiomycota
- Class: Agaricomycetes
- Order: Polyporales
- Family: Polyporaceae
- Genus: Cryptomphalina; R.Heim (1966)

Type species
- Cryptomphalina sulcata R.Heim (1966)

Genus of fungi

Cryptomphalina is a fungal genus in the family Polyporaceae. It is a monotypic genus, containing the single species Cryptomphalina sulcata, discovered in Thailand. French botanist Roger Heim circumscribed Cryptomphalina in 1966.
