= Lithopolyporales =

Scientific classification
- Kingdom: Fungi
- Division: Basidiomycota
- Class: Agaricomycetes
- Order: Polyporales
- Family: Polyporaceae
- Genus: Lithopolyporales; R.K. Kar, N. Sharma, A. Agarwal & R. Kar

Type species
- Lithopolyporales zeerabadensis R.K. Kar, N. Sharma, A. Agarwal & R. Kar

Genus of fungi

Lithopolyporales is a genus of fungi in the family Polyporaceae. This is a monotypic genus, containing the single species Lithopolyporales zeerabadensis.
