= Macrohyporia =

Scientific classification
- Kingdom: Fungi
- Division: Basidiomycota
- Class: Agaricomycetes
- Order: Polyporales
- Family: Polyporaceae
- Genus: Macrohyporia; I.Johans. & Ryvarden (1979)

Type species
- Macrohyporia dictyopora (Cooke) I.Johans. & Ryvarden (1979)

Species
- M. dictyopora M. inflata M. pileata

Genus of fungi

Macrohyporia is a genus of fungi in the family Polyporaceae. The genus was circumscribed by mycologists I. Johansen and Leif Ryvarden in 1979.
