= Pseudopiptoporus =

Scientific classification
- Kingdom: Fungi
- Division: Basidiomycota
- Class: Agaricomycetes
- Order: Polyporales
- Family: Polyporaceae
- Genus: Pseudopiptoporus; Ryvarden (1980)

Type species
- Pseudopiptoporus devians (Bres.) Ryvarden (1980)

Species
- P. chocolatus P. devians

Genus of fungi

Pseudopiptoporus is a genus of fungi in the family Polyporaceae. It was circumscribed by Norwegian mycologist Leif Ryvarden in 1980 with the type species Pseudopiptoporus devians. This fungus was originally published as Polyporus devians by Giacomo Bresadola in 1920. Pseudopiptoporus chocolatus was added to the genus in 2003.
