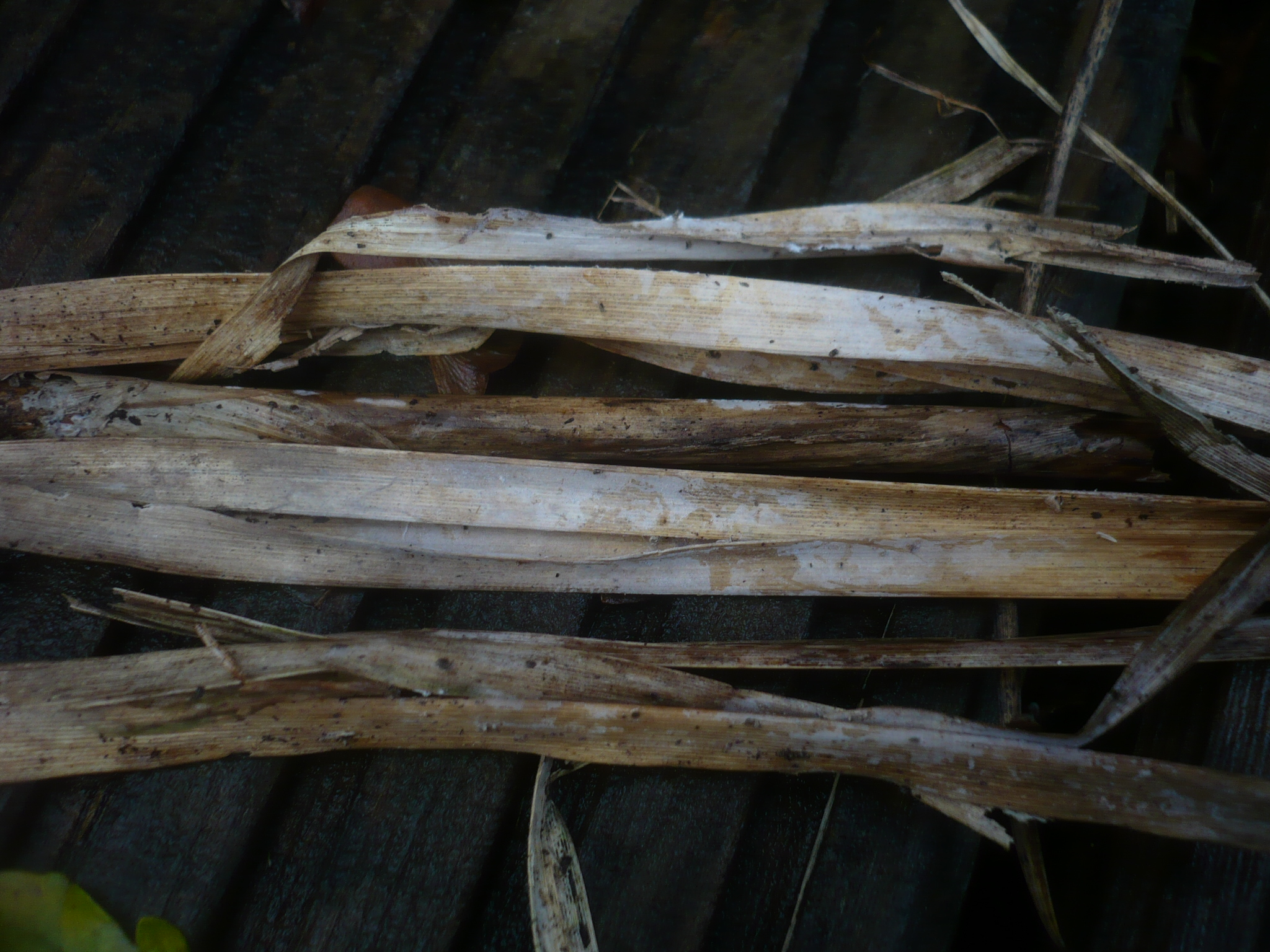
- Epithele typhae, Bonnefont, France

Scientific classification
- Kingdom: Fungi
- Division: Basidiomycota
- Class: Agaricomycetes
- Order: Polyporales
- Family: Polyporaceae
- Genus: Epithele (Pat.) Pat. (1900)

Type species
- Epithele typhae (Pat.) Pat. (1900)

Synonyms
- Hypochnus sect. Epithele Pat. (1899)

= Epithele =

Genus of fungi

Epithele is a genus of crust fungi in the family Polyporaceae.

== Taxonomy ==
Epithele was first proposed in 1899 by French mycologist Narcisse Théophile Patouillard as a section of the genus Hypochnus. He included Hypochnus dussii and the type species, H. typhae, based on their similar appearance, habitat, and organization. Patouillard emphasized the presence of hyphal pegs as a major distinguishing characteristic of the genus. Hyphal pegs are bundles of hyphae that originate in the trama and project into the hymenium. A year later, he raised Epithele to generic status, maintaining the same two species. Hypochnus dussii later became the type of the genus Tubulicium. Daisy Boquiren revised the genus in 1971, accepting 13 species. Later contributions to the systematics of Epithele were made by Jülich (1976), Boidin and Lanquetin (1983), Boidin and Gilles (2000), and Hjortstam and Ryvarden (2005). In 2013, Karen Nakasone emended the generic concept to include Epithele bambusae (a species without hyphal pegs), and accepted 17 species.

== Species ==
As of April 2024, Index Fungorum accepts 23 species of Epithele:

- Epithele bambusae (Burt) K.K.Nakasone (2013)
- Epithele bambusina Rick (1959) – Brazil
- Epithele belizensis K.K.Nakasone (2013)
- Epithele bisterigmata Boidin, Gilles & Duhem (2000) – Réunion
- Epithele ceracea K.K.Nakasone (2013)
- Epithele citrispora Boidin, Lanq. & Gilles (1983)
- Epithele cylindricosterigmata Han C.Wang & Sheng H.Wu (2010)
- Epithele efibulata Boidin, Lanq. & Gilles (1983)
- Epithele fasciculata (G.Cunn.) Boidin & Gilles (1986)
- Epithele horridula Rick (1940)
- Epithele hydnoides Burt (1923) – Hawaii
- Epithele interrupta Bres. (1914) – Congo
- Epithele lutea Han C.Wang & Sheng H.Wu (2010)
- Epithele macarangae Boidin & Lanq. (1983)
- Epithele malaiensis Boidin & Lanq. (1983)
- Epithele nikau G.Cunn. (1956) – New Zealand
- Epithele nivea Rick (1959) – Brazil
- Epithele ovalispora Boidin & Lanq. (1983)
- Epithele reunionis Nakasone (2013)
- Epithele ryvardenii Nakasone (2013)
- Epithele straminea Rick (1959) – Brazil
- Epithele subfusispora (Burds. & Nakasone) Hjortstam & Ryvarden (2005) – South America
- Epithele sulphurea Burt (1920) – North America
- Epithele typhae (Pers.) Pat. (1900)
