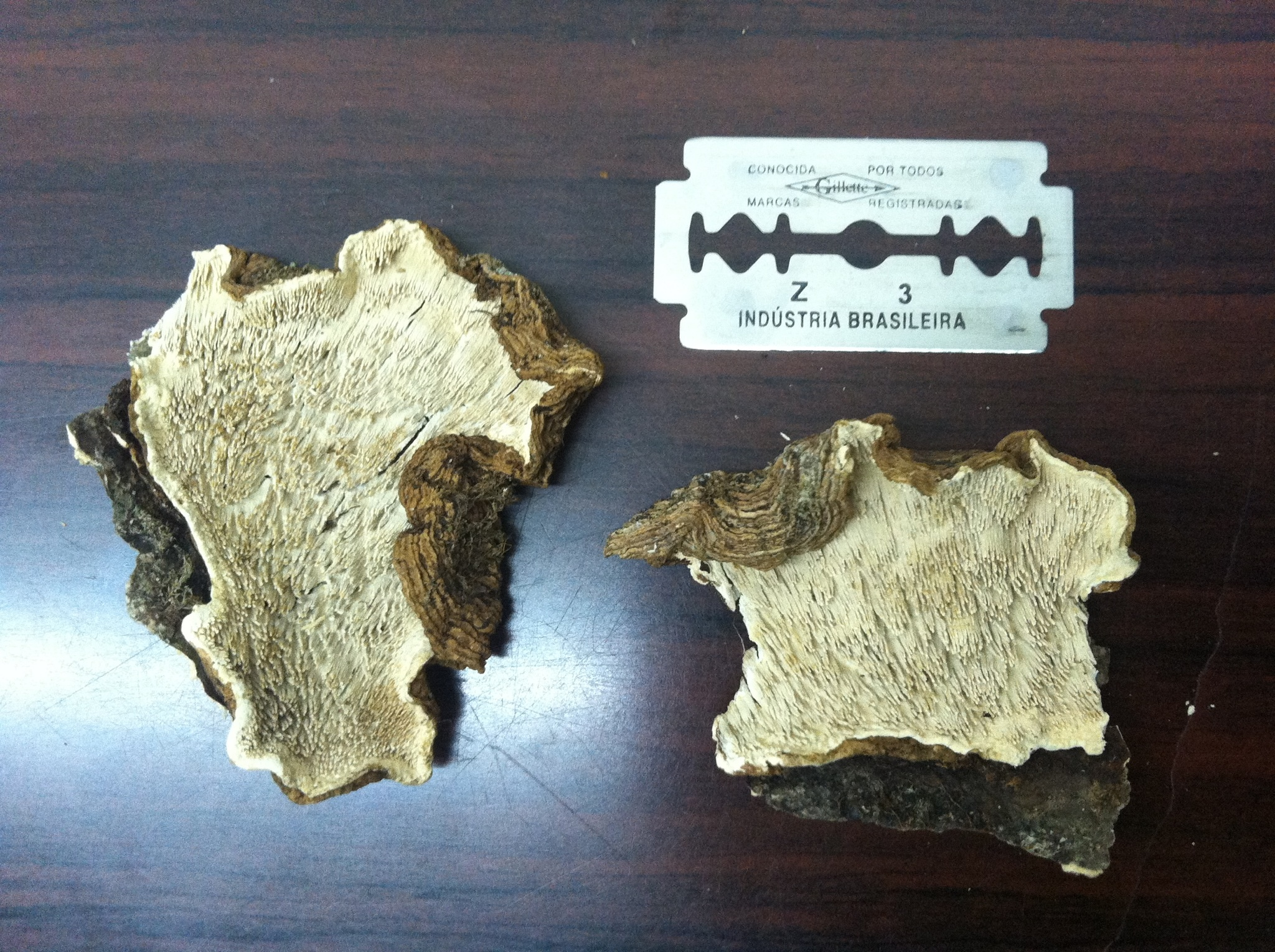
- Fuscocerrena portoricensis in Ecuador

Scientific classification
- Kingdom: Fungi
- Division: Basidiomycota
- Class: Agaricomycetes
- Order: Polyporales
- Family: Polyporaceae
- Genus: Fuscocerrena; Ryvarden (1982)

Type species
- Fuscocerrena portoricensis (Fr.) Ryvarden (1982)

Synonyms
- Polyporus portoricensis Fr. (1828); Cerrenella coriacea (Berk. & Ravenel) Murrill (1905); Cerrenella subcoriacea Murrill (1908)

= Fuscocerrena =

Genus of fungi

Fuscocerrena is a fungal genus in the family Polyporaceae. It is a monotypic genus, containing the single polypore species Fuscocerrena portoricensis, found in eastern North America, Central America, and South America.

== Taxonomy ==
Fuscocerrena was circumscribed by Norwegian mycologist Leif Ryvarden in 1982 to contain the fungus originally described by Elias Fries as Polyporus portoricensis. This species was also previously placed in Cerrenella, a genus proposed by William Murrill in 1905, but later abandoned.

== Description ==
The genus is characterized by its irregular fruit body that when fresh is farinose (covered by a white, mealy powder) and greenish white in colour; older fruit bodies become dark brown. Microscopically, the fungus features a dimitic hyphal system, generative hyphae with clamp connections, and dendrohyphidia (small, spiderweb-like hyphae)–a characteristic, which although common in the family Corticiaceae, is seldom encountered in the Polyporaceae. The spores of Fuscocerrena portoricensis are hyaline, cylindrical, and non-amyloid, measuring 5–7 by 2–2.5 μm.

== Habitat and distribution ==
Fuscocerrena portoricensis is found in eastern North America, Central America, and South America, and has also been collected in Cuba and Jamaica. It grows on decomposing deciduous wood.
