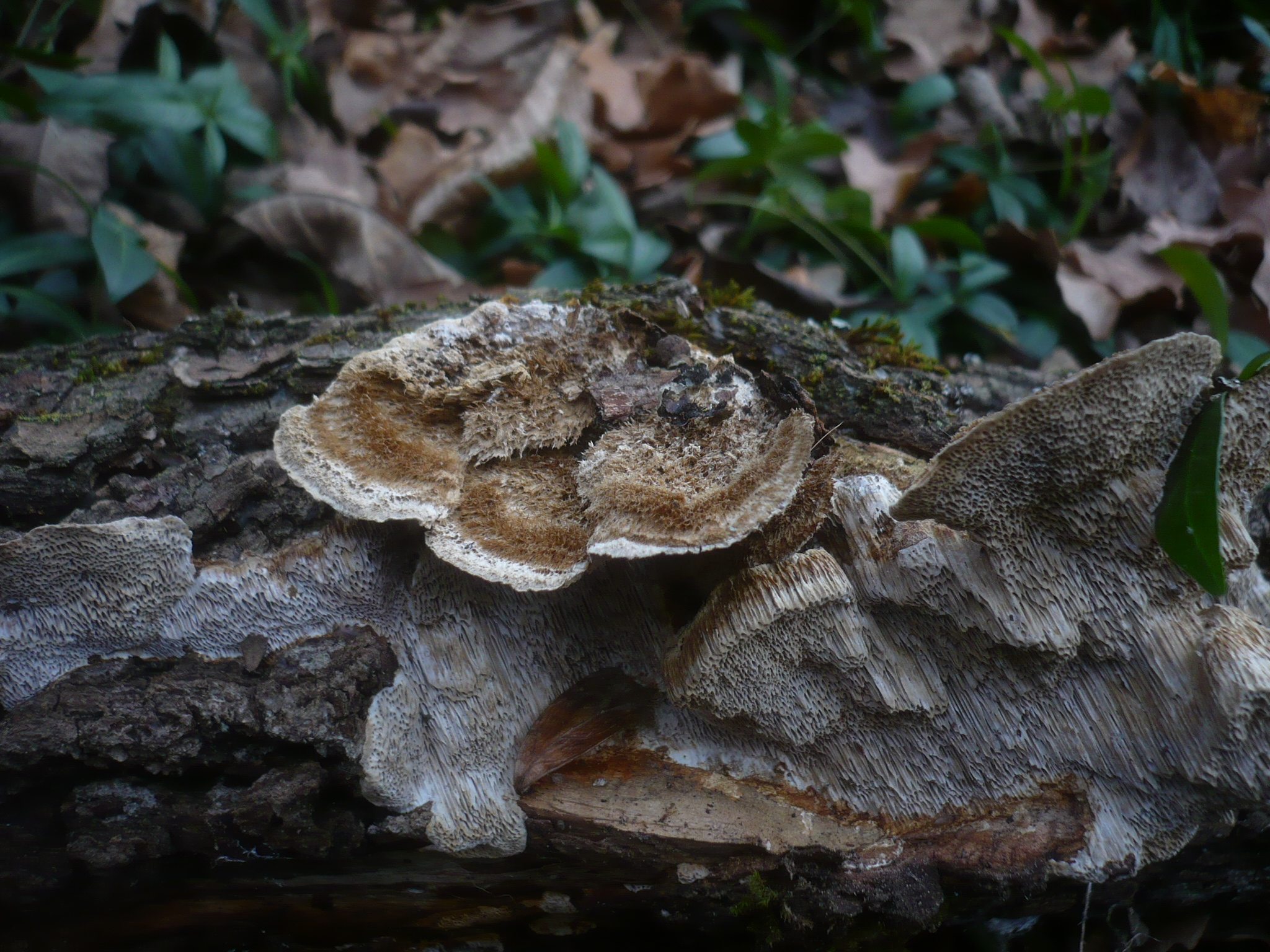
- Coriolopsis gallica

Scientific classification
- Kingdom: Fungi
- Division: Basidiomycota
- Class: Agaricomycetes
- Order: Polyporales
- Family: Polyporaceae
- Genus: Coriolopsis; Murrill (1905)

Type species
- Coriolopsis occidentalis (Klotzsch) Murrill (1905)

Synonyms
- Trametella Pinto-Lopes (1952)

= Coriolopsis =

Genus of fungi

Coriolopsis is a genus of fungi in the family Polyporaceae. It was circumscribed by American mycologist William Alphonso Murrill in 1905. The genus is cosmopolitan, with most species in tropical areas. The generic name combines the name Coriolus with the Ancient Greek word ὄψις ("appearance").

== Species ==
As of June 2017, Index Fungorum accepts 21 species of Coriolopsis:

- Coriolopsis albobadia (Lloyd) T.Hatt. & Sotome (2013)
- Coriolopsis antleroides Douanla-Meli & Ryvarden (2007)
- Coriolopsis badia (Berk.) Murrill (1907) – Philippines, Sierra Leone
- Coriolopsis bataanensis Murrill (1908)
- Coriolopsis brunneoleuca (Berk.) Ryvarden (1972) – Australia
- Coriolopsis burchellii (Berk. ex Cooke) Ryvarden (1988)
- Coriolopsis byrsina (Mont.) Ryvarden (1972)
- Coriolopsis daedaleoides (Berk.) Ryvarden (1972) – Papua New Guinea
- Coriolopsis fumosa Murrill (1912)
- Coriolopsis gallica (Fr.) Ryvarden (1973) – Africa, Europe, North America
- Coriolopsis helvola (Fr.) Ryvarden (1972) – Sierra Leone
- Coriolopsis luteo-olivacea (Berk.) Teng (1963)
- Coriolopsis luteola (X.Q.Zhang & J.D.Zhao) J.D.Zhao (1989) – China
- Coriolopsis occidentalis (Klotzsch) Murrill (1905) – Africa, Asia, South America
- Coriolopsis phaea (Lév.) Teng (1963)
- Coriolopsis phocina (Berk. & Broome) Murrill (1907)
- Coriolopsis pruinata (Klotzsch) Teng (1963) – Mauritius
- Coriolopsis suberosifusca (Corner) T.Hatt. & Sotome (2013)
- Coriolopsis taylorii Murrill (1908)
- Coriolopsis tuberculata Ryvarden (2000)
- Coriolopsis turgida (Lloyd) Teng (1963)
