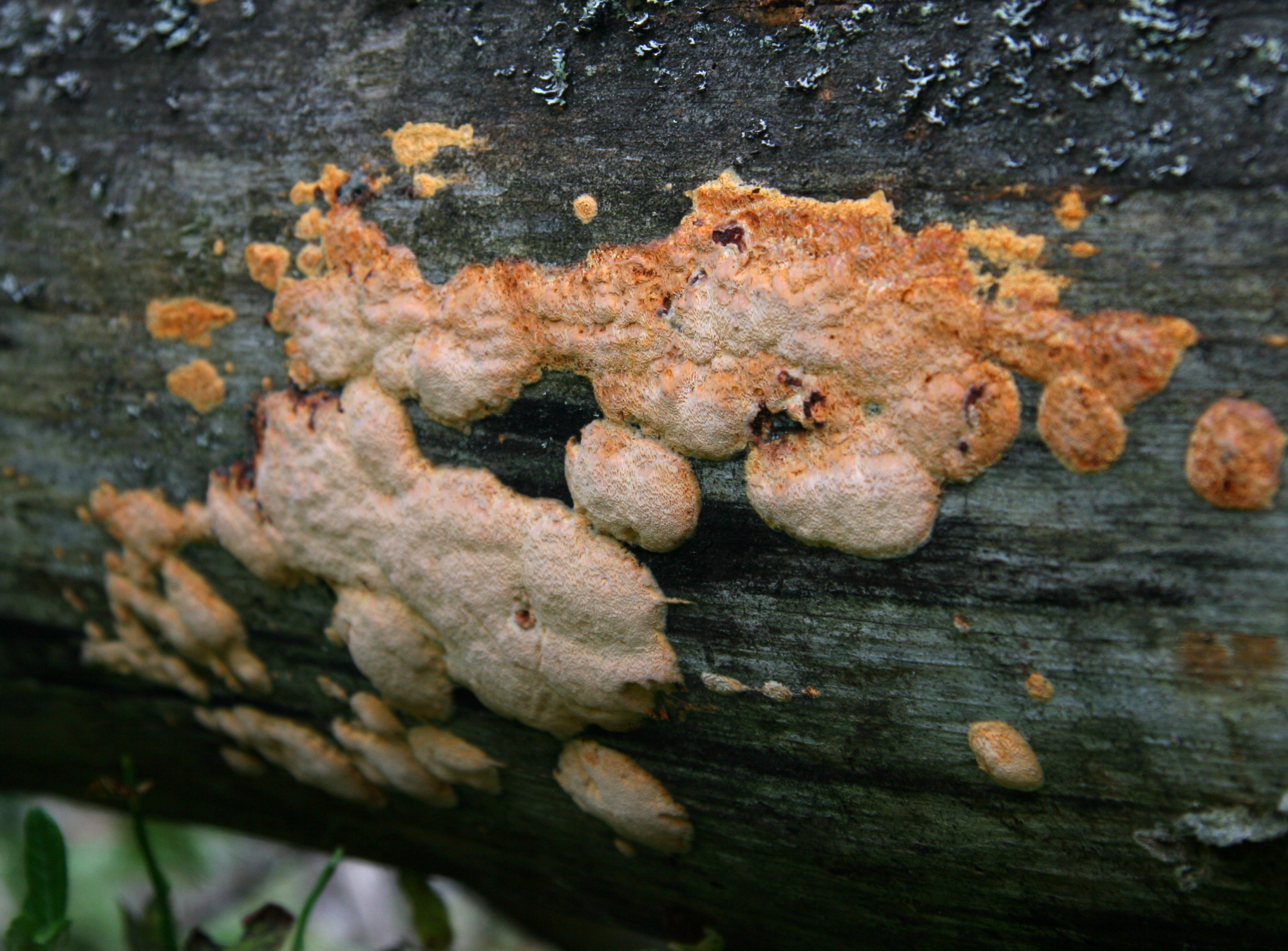

Scientific classification
- Kingdom: Fungi
- Division: Basidiomycota
- Class: Agaricomycetes
- Order: Polyporales
- Family: Polyporaceae
- Genus: Erastia; Niemelä & Kinnunen (2005)

Type species
- Erastia salmonicolor (Berk. & M.A.Curtis) Niemelä & Kinnunen (2005)

Synonyms
- Sarcoporia salmonicolor (Berk. & M.A. Curtis) Teixeira 1986; Postia salmonicolor (Berk. & M.A. Curtis) M.J. Larsen & Lombard 1986; Hapalopilus salmonicolor (Berk. & M.A. Curtis) Pouzar 1967; Hapalopilus aurantiacus (Rostk.) Bondartsev & Singer 1941; Leptoporus salmonicolor (Berk. & M.A. Curtis) Pat. 1900; Poria polyspora (P. Karst.) Sacc. 1895; Sarcoporia polyspora P. Karst. 1894; Poria mutans var. tenuis Peck 1890; Poria aurantiaca (Rostk.) P. Karst. 1888; Physisporus aurantiacus (Rostk.) P. Karst. 1887; Poria salmonicolor (Berk. & M.A. Curtis) Sacc. 1886; Polyporus salmonicolor Berk. & M.A. Curtis 1849; Polyporus aurantiacus Rostk. 1838

= Erastia =

Genus of fungi

Erastia is a fungal genus in the family Polyporaceae. It is a monotypic genus, containing the single European species Erastia salmonicolor, or the salmon bracket. Erastia was circumscribed by Finnish mycologists Tuomo Niemelä and Juha Kinnunen in 2005. It is named in honour of the Estonian mycologist Erast Parmasto, "the eminent researcher of fungal taxonomy and cladistics".
