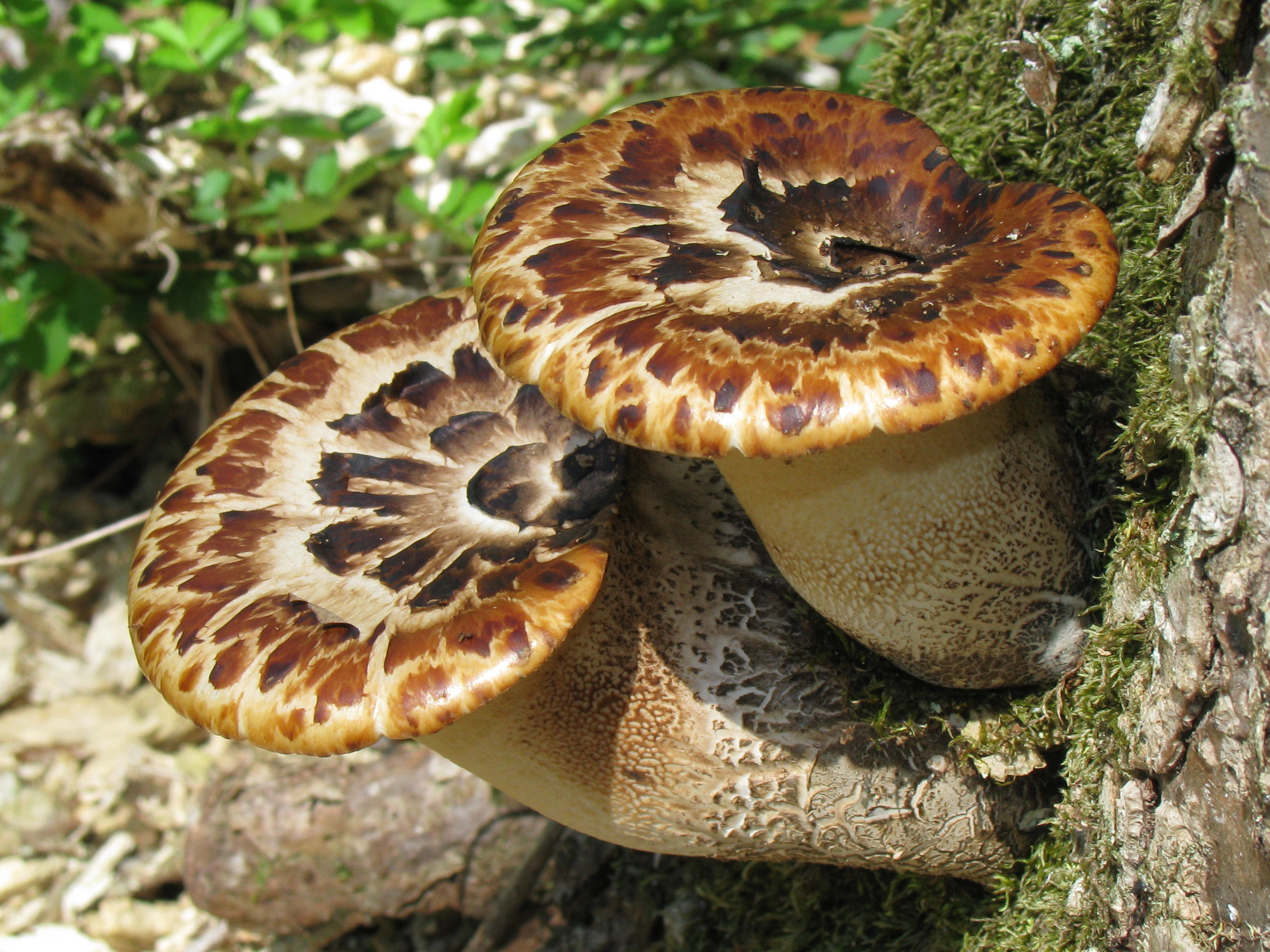
- Dryad's saddle (Cerioporus squamosus)

Scientific classification
- Kingdom: Fungi
- Division: Basidiomycota
- Class: Agaricomycetes
- Order: Polyporales
- Family: Polyporaceae; Fr. ex Corda (1839)

Type genus
- Polyporus P.Micheli ex Adans. (1763)

Synonyms
- Ganodermataceae (Donk) Donk (1948); Coriolaceae Singer (1961); Cryptoporaceae Jülich (1981); Echinochaetaceae Jülich (1981); Fomitaceae Jülich (1981); Grammotheleaceae Jülich (1981); Haddowiaceae Jülich (1981); Microporaceae Jülich (1981); Pachykytosporaceae Jülich (1981); Perenniporiaceae Jülich (1981); Sparsitubaceae Jülich (1981); Lophariaceae Boidin, Mugnier & Canales (1998); Trametaceae Boidin, Mugnier & Canales (1998)

= Polyporaceae =

Family of fungi

The Polyporaceae (/pɔːliːpoʊreɪsiˌaɪ, -siːˌiː/) are a family of poroid fungi belonging to the Basidiomycota. The flesh of their fruit bodies varies from soft (as in the case of the dryad's saddle illustrated) to very tough. Most members of this family have their hymenium (fertile layer) in vertical pores on the underside of the caps, but some of them have gills (e.g. Panus) or gill-like structures (such as Daedaleopsis, whose elongated pores form a corky labyrinth). Many species are brackets, but others have a definite stipe – for example, Polyporus badius.

Most of these fungi have white spore powder but members of the genus Abundisporus have colored spores and produce yellowish spore prints. Cystidia are absent.

== Taxonomy ==
In his 1838 work Epicrisis Systematis Mycologici seu Synopsis Hymenomycetum, Elias Magnus Fries introduced the "Polyporei". August Corda published the name validly the following year, retaining Fries's concept. American mycologist William Alphonso Murrill, in a series of publications in the early 1900s, classified the polypores into a more organized family of 78 genera, including 29 that were monotypic, and 39 that were new to science. Around the same time as Murrill, Curtis Gates Lloyd devoted considerable effort in sorting polypore taxonomy, and amassed a large and diverse collection of fruit bodies from around the world. In his 1953 monograph The Polyporaceae of the European U.S.S.R. and Caucasia, Apollinarii Semenovich Bondartsev included 54 genera in the Polyporaceae, which he further divided into five subfamilies and 10 tribes. Several works contributing to the systematics of the Polyporaceae were published in the following decades, including Marinus Anton Donk (1960, 1964), Gordon Heriot Cunningham (1965), and David Pegler (1973).

== Genera ==
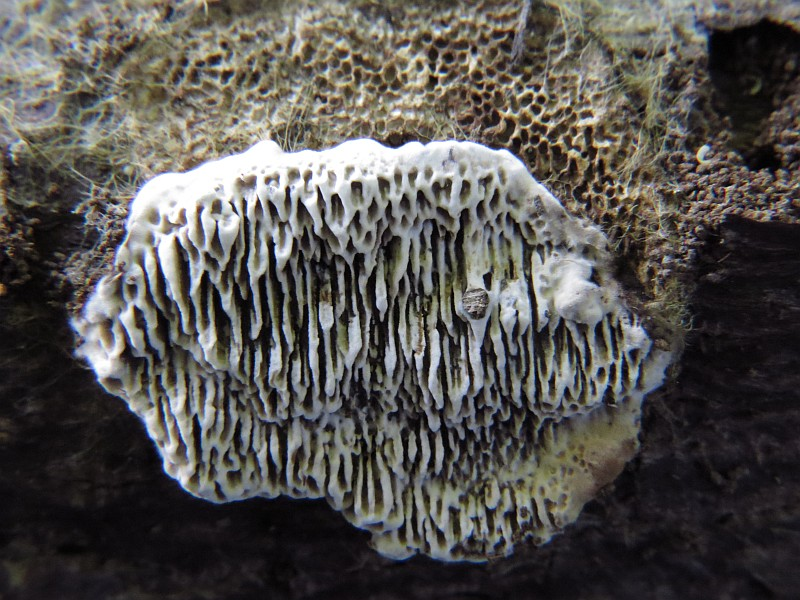
Datronia mollis

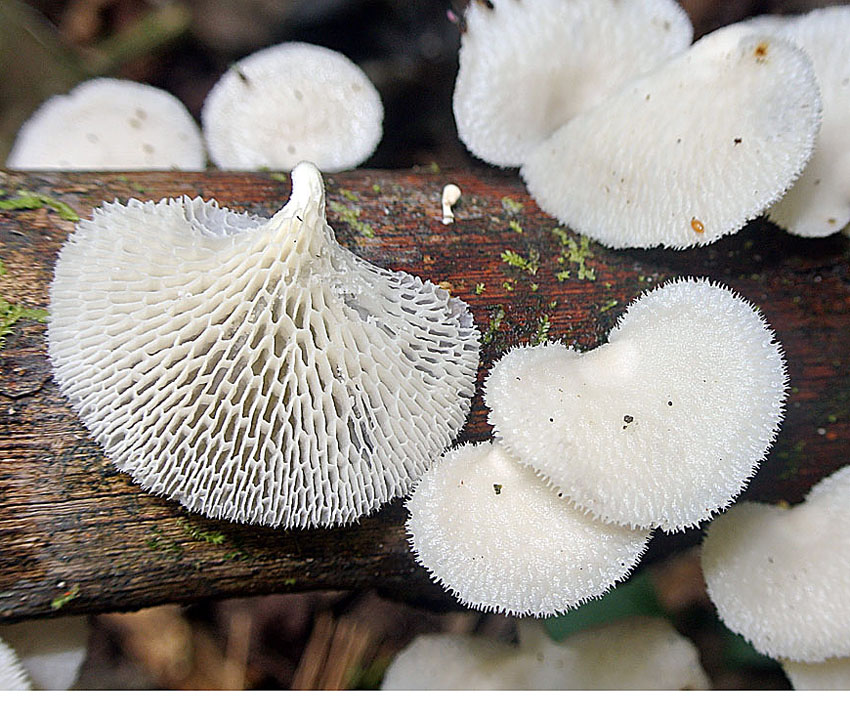
Favolus tenuiculus

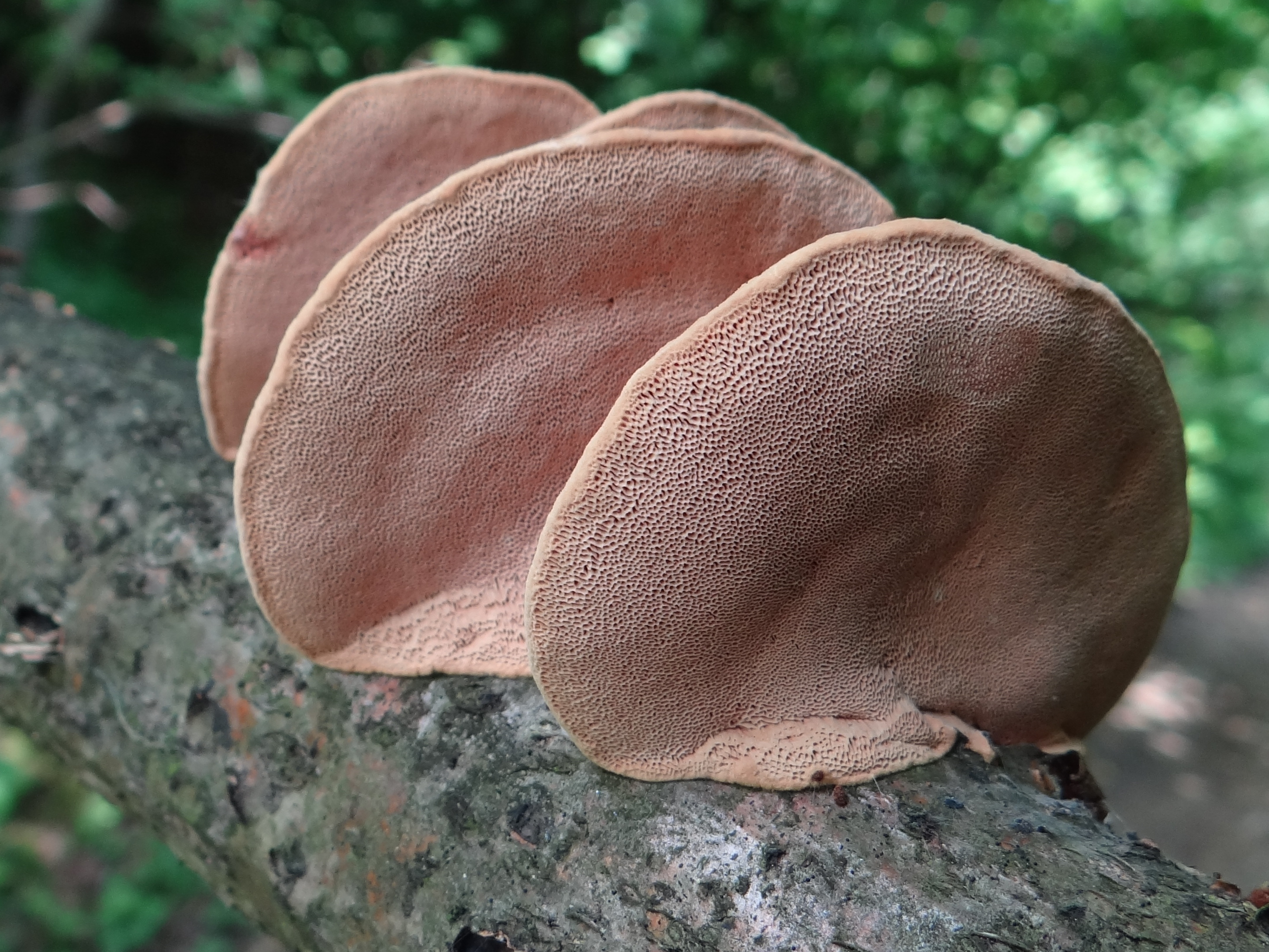
Hapalopilus nidulans

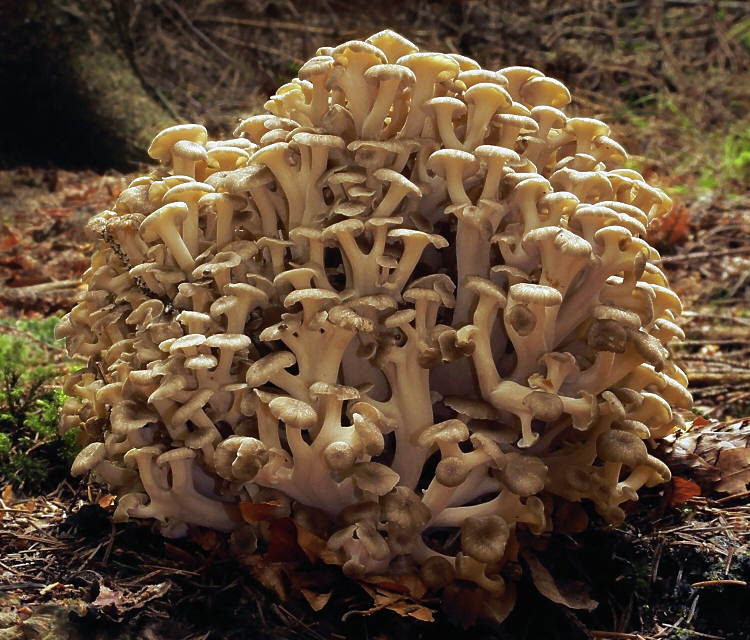
Polyporus umbellatus

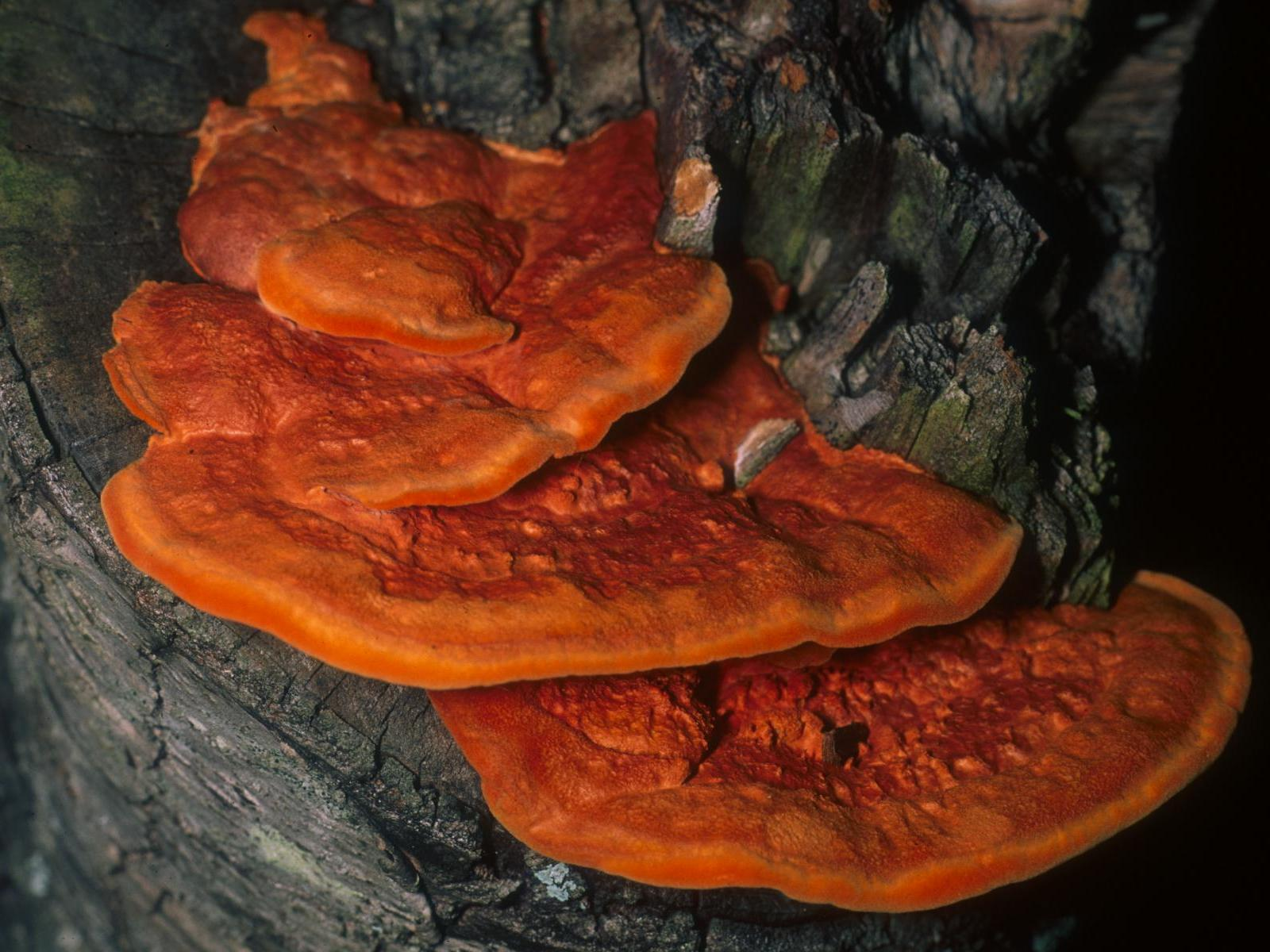
Pycnoporus cinnabarinus

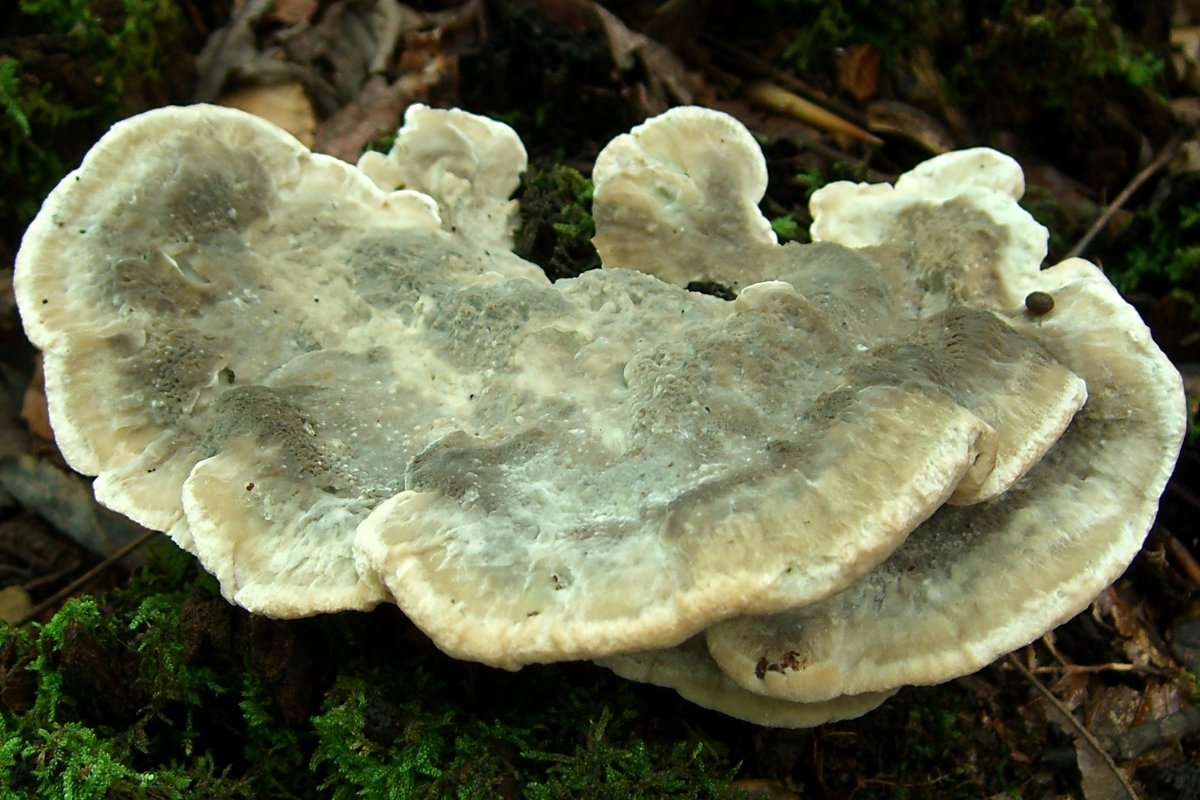
Tyromyces galactinus

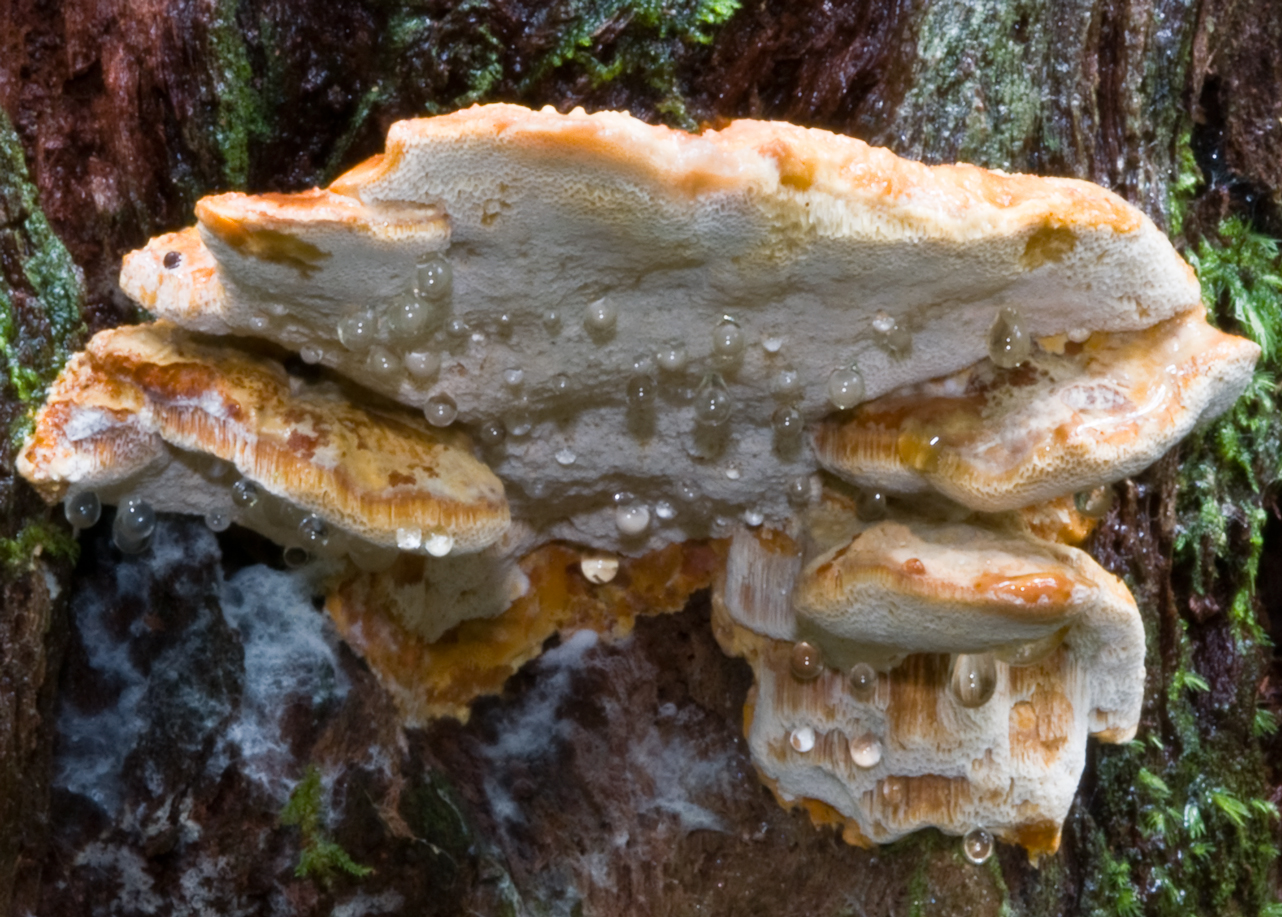
Ryvardenia cretacea

As of April 2018, Index Fungorum accepts 114 genera and 1621 species in the Polyporaceae:

- Abundisporus Ryvarden (1999); 7 species
- Amyloporia Singer (1944); 5 species
- Amyloporiella A.David & Tortič (1984); 1 species
- Atroporus Ryvarden (1973); 3 species
- Aurantiporus Murrill (1905); 5 species
- Australoporus P.K.Buchanan & Ryvarden (1988); 1 species
- Austrolentinus Ryvarden (1991); 1 species
- Cellulariella Zmitr. & Malysheva (2014); 2 species
- Cerrena Gray (1821); 7 species
- Cerarioporia F.Wu, L.W.Zhou & Jing Si; 1 species
- Colospora Miettinen & Spirin (2015); 1 species
- Coriolopsis Murrill (1905); 21 species
- Crassisporus B.K. Cui & Xing Ji (2019); 4 species
- Cryptomphalina R.Heim (1966); 1 species
- Cryptoporus (Peck) Shear (1902); 2 species
- Cystidiophorus Bondartsev & Ljub. (1963); 1 species
- Daedaleopsis J.Schröt. (1888); 9 species
- Datronia Donk (1966); 8 species
- Datroniella B.K.Cui, Hai J.Li & Y.C.Dai (2014); 5 species
- Dentocorticium (Parmasto) M.J.Larsen & Gilb. (1974); 7 species
- Dextrinoporus H.S.Yuan (2018); 1 species
- Dichomitus D.A.Reid (1965); 24 species
- Diplomitoporus Domański (1970); 20 species
- Earliella Murrill (1905); 1 species
- Echinochaete D.A.Reid (1963); 5 species
- Epithele (Pat.) Pat. (1900); 24 species
- Epithelopsis Jülich (1976); 2 species
- Erastia Niemelä & Kinnunen (2005); 1 species
- Faerberia Pouzar (1981); 1 species
- Favolus Fr. (1828); 25 species
- Flammeopellis Y.C.Dai, B.K.Cui & C.L.Zhao (2014); 1 species
- Fomes (Fr.) Fr. (1849); 59 species
- Funalia Pat. (1900); 7 species
- Fuscocerrena Ryvarden (1982); 1 species
- Globifomes Murrill (1904); 1 species
- Grammothele Berk. & M.A.Curtis (1868); 19 species
- Grammothelopsis Jülich (1982); 7 species
- Hapalopilus P.Karst. (1881); 15 species
- Haploporus Bondartsev & Singer (1944); 6 species
- Hexagonia Fr. (1836); 41 species
- Hymenogramme Mont. & Berk. (1844); 1 species
- Laccocephalum McAlpine & Tepper (1895); 5 species
- Laetifomes T.Hatt. (2001); 1 species
- Leifiporia Y.C.Dai, F.Wu & C.L.Zhao (2016); 2 species
- Leiotrametes Welti & Courtec. (2012); 2 species
- Lentinus Fr. (1825); 120 species
- Lenzites Fr. (1836); 25 species
- Leptoporus Quél. (1886); 12 species
- Lignosus Lloyd ex Torrend (1920); 8 species
- Lithopolyporales R.K.Kar, N.Sharma, A.Agarwal & R.Kar (2003); 1 species
- Lloydella Bres. (1901); 3 species
- Lopharia Kalchbr. & MacOwan (1881); 15 species
- Loweporus J.E.Wright (1976); 8 species
- Macrohyporia I.Johans. & Ryvarden (1979); 3 species
- Megasporia B.K.Cui, Y.C.Dai & Hai J.Li (2013); 7 species
- Megasporoporia Ryvarden & J.E.Wright (1982); 4 species
- Megasporoporiella B.K.Cui, Y.C.Dai & Hai J.Li (2013); 5 species
- Melanoderma B.K.Cui & Y.C.Dai (2011); 2 species
- Melanoporella Murrill (1907); 1 species
- Microporellus Murrill (1905); 23 species
- Microporus P.Beauv. (1805); 12 species
- Mollicarpus Ginns (1984); 1 species
- Mycobonia Pat. (1894); 1 species
- Myriothele Nakasone (2013); 1 species
- Navisporus Ryvarden (1980); 6 species
- Neodatronia B.K.Cui, Hai J.Li & Y.C.Dai (2014); 2 species
- Neodictyopus Palacio, Robledo, Reck & Drechsler-Santos; 3 species
- Neofavolus Sotome & T.Hatt. (2013); 4 species
- Neofomitella Y.C.Dai, Hai J.Li & Vlasák (2015); 3 species
- Nigrofomes Murrill (1904); 2 species
- Pachykytospora Kotl. & Pouzar (1963); 3 species
- Panus Fr. (1838); 40 species
- Perenniporia Murrill (1942); 100 species
- Perenniporiella Decock & Ryvarden (2003); 5 species
- Perenniporiopsis C.L.Zhao (2017); 1 species
- Phaeotrametes Lloyd ex J.E.Wright (1966); 1 species
- Piloporia Niemelä (1982); 2 species
- Podofomes Pouzar (1966); 3 species
- Polyporus P.Micheli ex Adans. (1763); 279 species
- Porogramme (Pat.) Pat. (1900); 7 species
- Poronidulus Murrill (1904); 2 species
- Pseudofavolus Pat. (1900); 6 species
- Pseudopiptoporus Ryvarden (1980); 2 species
- Pseudomegasporoporia 1 species
- Pycnoporus P.Karst. (1881); 4 species
- Pyrofomes Kotl. & Pouzar (1964); 7 species
- Roseofavolus T.Hatt. (2003); 1 species
- Royoporus A.B.De (1996); 2 species
- Rubroporus Log.-Leite, Ryvarden & Groposo (2002); 2 species
- Ryvardenia Rajchenb. (1994); 2 species
- Sarcoporia P.Karst. (1894); 3 species
- Skeletocutis Kotl. & Pouzar (1958); 43 species
- Sparsitubus L.W.Hsu & J.D.Zhao (1980); 1 species
- Spongipellis Pat. (1887); 9 species
- Stiptophyllum Ryvarden (1973); 1 species
- Thermophymatospora Udagawa, Awao & Abdullah (1986); 1 species
- Tinctoporellus Ryvarden (1979); 4 species
- Trametes Fr. (1836); 195 species
- Trametopsis Tomšovský (2008); 1 species
- Tyromyces P.Karst. (1881); 119 species
- Truncospora Pilát (1953); 10 species
- Vanderbylia D.A.Reid (1973); 7 species
- Wolfiporia Ryvarden & Gilb. (1984); 6 species
- Xerotus Fr. (1828); 16 species
- Yuchengia B.K.Cui & Steffen (2013); 1 species

In a proposed family-level classification of the Polyporales based on molecular phylogenetics, Alfredo Justo and colleagues propose synonymizing the Ganodermataceae with the Polyporaceae, and accept 44 genera in this family: Abundisporus, Amauroderma, Cerarioporia, Colospora, Cryptoporus, Datronia, Datroniella, Dendrodontia, Dentocorticium, Dichomitus, Donkioporia, Earliella, Echinochaete, Epithele, Favolus, Fomes, Fomitella, Ganoderma, Grammothele, Grammothelopsis, Hexagonia, Haploporus, Hornodermoporus, Lentinus, Lignosus, Lopharia, Megasporia, Megasporoporia, Melanoderma, Microporellus, Microporus, Neodatronia, Neofavolus, Pachykytospora, Perenniporia, Perenniporiella, Pseudofavolus, Pyrofomes, Tinctoporellus, Tomophagus, Trametes, Truncospora, Vanderbylia, and Yuchengia.
