= List of peach and nectarine diseases =

This article is a list of diseases of peaches and nectarines (Peach: Prunus persica; Nectarine: P. persica var. nucipersica).

== Bacterial diseases ==
Bacterial diseases
Bacterial canker	Pseudomonas syringae pv. syringae
Bacterial spot = bacteriosis	Xanthomonas pruni = X. arboricola pv. pruni = X. campestris pv. pruni
Crown gall	Agrobacterium tumefaciens
Phony disease = phony peach	Xylella fastidiosa

== Fungal diseases ==
Fungal diseases
Alternaria rot	Alternaria alternata Alternaria spp.
Anthracnose	Glomerella cingulata [teleomorph] (archaic) Colletotrichum gloeosporioides species complex: C. siamense; C. fructicola; Colletotrichum acutatum species complex: C. fioriniae; C. nymphaeae; C. simmondsii
Armillaria crown and root rot	Armillaria mellea A. solidipes Armillaria bulbosa Armillaria tabescens = Clitocybe tabescens
Brown rot blossom blight and fruit rot	Monilinia fructicola Monilinia laxa
Cercospora leaf spot	Cercospora circumscissa Cercospora rubrotincta
Ceratocystis canker	Ceratocystis fimbriata
Constriction canker = Fusicoccum canker, Phomopsis shoot blight	Phomopsis amygdali = Fusicoccum amygdali
Cytospora canker	Leucostoma persoonii Cytospora leucostoma [anamorph]
Fusarium canker	Fusarium spp.
Gummosis (blister canker in Japan)	Botryosphaeria dothidea = Botryosphaeria berengeriana Fusicoccum aesculi [anamorph] Botryosphaeria obtusa Botryosphaeria rhodina Botryosphaeria ribis
Green fruit rot	Botrytis cinerea Botryotinia fuckeliana [teleomorph] Monilinia fructicola Monilinia laxa
	Sclerotinia sclerotiorum
Leaf curl	Taphrina deformans
Phymatotrichopsis root rot	Phymatotrichopsis omnivora = Phymatotrichum omnivorum
Phytophthora crown and root rot	Phytophthora cactorum Phytophthora cambivora Phytophthora citricola Phytophthora citrophthora Phytophthora cryptogea Phytophthora drechsleri Phytophthora megasperma Phytophthora parasitica Phytophthora syringae Phytophthora sp.
Powdery mildew	Podosphaera spp.
Pythium root rot	Pythium ultimum
Rhizoctonia root rot	Rhizoctonia solani Thanatephorus cucumeris [teleomorph]
Ripe fruit rots
Aspergillus rot	Aspergillus niger
Blue mold	Penicillium sp.
Botrytis rot	Botrytis cinerea Botryotinia fuckeliana [teleomorph]
Sour rot	Geotrichum candidum Candida albicans
Fusarium rot	Fusarium avenaceum Gibberella avenacea [teleomorph] Fusarium oxysporum Fusarium solani Nectria haematococca [teleomorph]
Gilbertella rot	Gilbertella persicaria
Phomopsis fruit rot	Phomopsis sp.
Pink fruit rot	Trichothecium roseum
Rhizopus rot	Rhizopus arrhizus Rhizopus circinans Rhizopus stolonifer
Mucor rot	Mucor spp. Mucor piriformis
...
Rust	Tranzschelia discolor f.sp. persica
Scab	Cladosporium carpophilum = Fusicladium carpophilum Venturia carpophila [teleomorph] Cladosporium spp.
Shot hole	Wilsonomyces carpophilus = Stigmina carpophila
Silver leaf	Chondrostereum purpureum
Verticillium wilt	Verticillium dahliae
Wood decay (Pathogenicity has not been proven for these fungi; other wood decay fungi that cause significant diseases include Armillaria mellea, Armillaria tabescens, and Chondrostereum purpureum.)	Antrodia albida Ceriporia spissa Coriolopsis gallica Daedaleopsis confragosa Dendrophora albobadia Fomitopsis cajanderi Fomitopsis meliae Fomitopsis nivosa Fomitopsis palustris Fomitopsis pinicola Fomitopsis rosea Ganoderma annularis Ganoderma applanatum Ganoderma brownii Ganoderma lobatum Ganoderma lucidum Gloeophyllum mexicanum Gloeophyllum sepiarium Gloeophyllum trabeum Gloeoporus dichrous Inonotus dryophilus Irpex lacteus Laeticorticium roseum Laetiporus sulphureus Lenzites betulina Meruliopsis ambiguus Oxyporus corticola Oxyporus latemarginatus Oxyporus populinus Oxyporus similis Perenniporia fraxinophila Perenniporia medulla-panis Phanerochaete velutina Phellinus ferreus Phellinus ferruginosus Phellinus gilvus Phellinus pomaceus Pycnoporus cinnabarinus Schizophyllum commune Schizophyllum paradoxa Stereum hirsutum Stereum ochraceo-flavum Trametes elegans Trametes hirsuta Trametes pubescens Trametes versicolor Trichaptum biforme Tyromyces chioneus Tyromyces galactinus

== Nematodes, parasitic ==
Nematodes, parasitic
Dagger nematode	Xiphinema americanum Xiphinema rivesi
Lesion nematode	Pratylenchus penetrans Pratylenchus vulnus
Ring nematode	Mesocriconema xenoplax = Criconemella xenoplax
Root knot nematode	Meloidogyne arenaria Meloidogyne hapla Meloidogyne incognita Meloidogyne javanica

== Viral and viroid diseases ==
(Also uncharacterized graft-transmissible pathogens [GTP])

Viral and viroid diseases
Asteroid spot = cherry Utah dixie spot	GTP
Bark and wood grooving	GTP
Blotch	GTP
Calico	GTP
Chlorosis	GTP
Chlorotic spot	GTP
Enation	Peach enation virus
Dark green sunken mottle	genus Trichovirus, Apple chlorotic leaf spot virus (ACLSV)
Latent mosaic	Peach latent mosaic viroid
Line pattern	genus Ilarvirus, Prunus necrotic ringspot virus (PNRSV) genus Ilarvirus, Apple mosaic virus (ApMV)
Line pattern and leaf curl = cherry line pattern leaf curl	GTP (associated with an isometric particle)
Mosaic	Peach mosaic virus
Mottle	GTP
Mule's ear	GTP (associated with PNRSV)
Necrotic ringspot	genus Ilarvirus, Prunus necrotic ringspot virus (PNRSV)
Oil blotch	GTP
Plum pox = Sharka	genus Potyvirus, Plum pox virus (PPV)
Prunus stem pitting	genus Nepovirus, Tomato ringspot virus (ToRSV)
Purple mosaic	GTP
Rosette and decline	genus Ilarvirus, Prunus necrotic ringspot virus (PNRSV) + genus Ilarvirus, Prune dwarf virus (PDV)
Rosette mosaic	Peach rosette mosaic virus
Seedling chlorosis	GTP
Shoot stunting (= almond enation)	genus Nepovirus, Tomato black ring virus (TBRV)
Star mosaic	GTP
Stubby twig	GTP
Stunt	genus Ilarvirus, Prune dwarf virus (PDV) + genus Ilarvirus, Prunus necrotic ringspot virus (PNRSV)
Wart	GTP
Willow leaf rosette	Strawberry latent ringspot virus (SLRSV) + an unknown sap-transmissible virus
Yellow bud mosaic	genus Nepovirus, Tomato ringspot virus (ToRSV)
Yellow mosaic	GTP
Yellow mottle	GTP

== Phytoplasma diseases ==
Phytoplasmal and spiroplasmal diseases
Apricot chlorotic leaf roll	Phytoplasma
Little peach (= yellows)	Phytoplasma
Red Suture (= yellows)	Phytoplasma
Rosette	Phytoplasma
X-Disease	Phytoplasma
Yellow leaf roll	Phytoplasma
Yellows	Phytoplasma

== Miscellaneous diseases and disorders diseases ==
Miscellaneous diseases and disorders diseases
Peach tree short life	Complex of ring nematode, bacterial canker, Cytospora canker, and/or cold injury
