= List of apricot diseases =

This article is a list of diseases of apricots (Prunus armeniaca).

== Bacterial diseases ==
Bacterial diseases
Bacterial canker and blast	Pseudomonas syringae pv. syringae
Bacterial spot	Xanthomonas pruni = X. arboricola pv. pruni = X. campestris pv. pruni
Crown gall	Agrobacterium tumefaciens

== Fungal diseases ==
Fungal diseases
Alternaria spot and fruit rot	Alternaria alternata
Armillaria crown and root rot (shoestring crown and root rot)	Armillaria mellea Rhizomorpha subcorticalis [anamorph]
Brown rot blossom and twig blight and fruit rot	Monilinia fructicola Monilinia laxa
Ceratocystis canker	Ceratocystis fimbriata
Cytospora canker	Cytospora leucostoma Leucostoma persoonii [teleomorph]
Dematophora root rot	Rosellinia necatrix Dematophora necatrix [anamorph]
Eutypa dieback	Eutypa lata Cytosporina spp. [anamorph]
Green fruit rot	Botrytis cinerea Botrytis cinerea [teleomorph] Sclerotinia sclerotiorum
Leaf spot	Phyllosticta circumscissa
Phytophthora crown and root rot	Phytophthora cactorum Phytophthora cambivora Phytophthora cinnamomi Phytophthora citricola Phytophthora dreschsleri Phytophthora megasperma Phytophthora syringae
Phytophthora pruning wound canker	Phytophthora syringae
Powdery mildew	Podosphaera spp.
Replant problems	Fungi and others (see under Miscellaneous Disorders)
Rhizopus fruit rot	Rhizopus arrhizus Rhizopus circinans Rhizopus stolonifer
Ripe fruit rot	Aspergillus niger Cladosporium spp. Mucor spp. Penicillium expansum Penicillium italicum
Scab	Cladosporium carpophilum Venturia carpophila [teleomorph]
Shot hole	Wilsonomyces carpophilus = Stigmina carpophila
Silver leaf	Chondrostereum purpureum
Verticillium wilt	Verticillium dahliae
Wood rots (pathogenicity has not been proven for these fungi)	Cerrena unicolor Coprinus spp. Coriolopsis gallica Daedaleopsis confragosa Dendrophora albobadia Dendrophora erumpens Fomes fomentarius Fomitopsis cajanderi Fomitopsis pinicola Fomitopsis rosea Ganoderma applanatum Ganoderma lucidum Gloeophyllum sepiarium Gloeophyllum trabeum Gloeoporus dichrous Grandinia granulosa = Hyphodontia aspera Heterobasidion annosum (unconfirmed); Hyphodermella corrugata Inonotus dryophilus Irpex lacteus Laetiporus sulphureus Oxyporus corticola Oxyporus latemarginatus Oxyporus populinus Perenniporia fraxinophila Perenniporia medulla-panis Phellinus ferreus Phellinus ferruginosus Phellinus gilvus Phellinus igniarius Phellinus pomaceus Pholiota spp. Pholiota varius Pycnoporus cinnabarinus Schizophyllum commune Stereum spp. Trametes elegans Trametes hirsuta Trametes versicolor

== Nematodes, parasitic ==
Nematodes, parasitic
Dagger	Xiphinema americanum Xiphinema rivesi
Lesion	Pratylenchus vulnus
Ring	Criconemella xenoplax
Root-knot	Meloidogyne arenaria Meloidogyne incognita Meloidogyne javanica

== Viral diseases ==
includes uncharacterized graft-transmissible pathogens [GTP]

Viral diseases
Bare twig and unfruitfulness	genus Nepovirus, Strawberry latent ringspot virus genus Tobamovirus, Cucumber green mottle mosaic virus
Line pattern & Necrotic ring spot	genus Ilarvirus, Prunus necrotic ringspot virus (PNRSV)
Peach mosaic	genus Trichovirus, Cherry mottle leaf virus (CMLV)
Plum pox (= Sharka)	genus Potyvirus, Plum pox virus (PPV)
Prunus stem pitting	genus Nepovirus, Tomato ringspot virus (ToRSV)
Pseudopox	genus Trichovirus, Apple chlorotic leaf spot virus (ACLSV)
Viral gummosis	genus Ilarvirus, Prune dwarf virus (PDV)

== Graft-transmissible pathogens [GTP] ==
Graft-transmissible pathogens [GTP]

Asteroid spot (= Peach asteroid spot)
Cherry mottle leaf
Chlorotic leaf mottle
Deformation mosaic (associated with an isometric particle)
Moorpark mottle
Peach yellow mottle
Pucker leaf
Ring pox (= Spur cherry?)
Stone pitting

== Phytoplasmal diseases ==
Phytoplasmal diseases
Chlorotic leaf roll (= Apple proliferation)	Witches' broom

== Miscellaneous diseases or disorders ==
Miscellaneous diseases or disorders
Apricot gumboil	Unknown etiology (nontransmissible)
Replant problems	Bacteria, fungi, nematodes, viruses, nutrients, toxins and environmental conditions (?)
