= List of avocado diseases =

This article is a list of diseases of avocados (Persea americana).

== Bacterial diseases ==
Bacterial diseases
Bacterial canker	Pseudomonas syringae Xanthomonas campestris
Blast and bacterial fruit spot	Pseudomonas syringae
Crown gall	Agrobacterium tumefaciens

== Fungal diseases ==
Fungal diseases
Anthracnose	Colletotrichum gloeosporioides; Glomerella cingulata [teleomorph]
Armillaria root rot Shoestring root rot	Armillaria mellea; Rhizomorpha subcorticalis [anamorph]
Black mildew	Asteridiella perseae; Irene perseae
Branch canker	Botryosphaeria disrupta; Botryosphaeria obtusa; Physalospora obtusa; Botryosphaeria quercuum; Physalospora glandicola; Botryosphaeria rhodina; Physalospora rhodina; Physalospora abdita; Physalospora fusca
Butt rot	Ganoderma zonatum; Ganoderma sulcatum
Cercospora spot (blotch)	Pseudocercospora purpurea
Clitocybe root rot	Armillaria tabescens; Clitocybe tabescens
Collar rot	Sclerotinia sclerotiorum
Dematophora root rot	Dematophora necatrix; Rosellinia necatrix [teleomorph]
Dieback	Diplodia cacaoicola; Phomopsis sp.
Fruit rot (includes stem end rot & fruit spots)	Botryodiplodia spp.; Botryosphaeria obtusa; Botryosphaeria quercuum; Botryosphaeria rhodina; Botrytis cinerea; Botrytis vulgaris; Botryotinia fuckeliana [teleomorph]; Colletotrichum gloeosporioides; Cylindrocladium scoparium; Calonectria kyotensis [teleomorph]; Dothiorella aromatica; Dothiorella gregaria; Fusarium decemcellulare; Albonectria rigidiuscula [teleomorph]; Lasiodiplodia theobromae; Diplodia natalensis; Nectria pseudotrichia; Tubercularia lateritia [anamorph]; Pestalotia spp.; Pestalotiopsis versicolor; Phomopsis perseae; Rhizopus stolonifer; Sclerotinia sclerotiorum; Sclerotinia libertiana
Heart rot	Oxyporus latemarginatus; Poria latemarginata
Leaf spots	Bipolaris sorokiniana; Cochliobolus sativus [teleomorph]; Pestalotia spp.; Pestalotiopsis adusta; Phyllachora gratissima; Phyllosticta micropuncta; Phyllosticta perseae
Phomopsis spot	Phomopsis spp.
Physalospora canker	Physalospora perseae
Phytophthora crown rot	Phytophthora cinnamomi; Phytophthora citricola
Phytophthora trunk canker	Phytophthora cinnamomi; Phytophthora citricola; Phytophthora heveae
Phytophthora root rot	Phytophthora cinnamomi
Pink rot	Trichothecium roseum; Cephalothecium roseum
Powdery mildew	Oidium spp.
Rhizoctonia seed and root rot	Rhizoctonia solani; Thanatephorus cucumeris [teleomorph]
Root and bark rot	Fusarium spp.
Root rot	Pythium spp.
Rosellinia root rot	Rosellinia bunodes
Rusty blight	Colletotrichum gloeosporioides; Colletotrichum nigrum
Scab (fruit & leaf)	Sphaceloma perseae
Seedling blight	Phytophthora palmivora; Sclerotium rolfsii; Athelia rolfsii [teleomorph]
Smudgy spot	Helminthosporium spp.
Sooty blotch	Akaropeltopsis sp.
Tar spot	Phyllachora gratissima
Verticillium wilt	Verticillium dahliae
Wood rots	Fomitopsis supina; Polyporus supinus; Laetiporus sulphureus; Polyporus sulphureus; Sporotrichum versisporum [anamorph]; Rigidoporus ulmarius; Fomes geotropus; Trametes hirsuta; Polyporus hirsutus

== Viruslike diseases ==
Viruslike diseases
Sunblotch	Avocado sunblotch viroid
Trunk pitting	Graft transmissible agent

== Miscellaneous diseases and disorders ==
Miscellaneous diseases and disorders
Algal spot	Cephaleuros virescens Kunze
Blackstreak	Unknown cause
Dieback	Copper deficiency
Edema	Physiological
Littleleaf rosette	Zinc deficiency
Tipburn	Excess mineral salts
