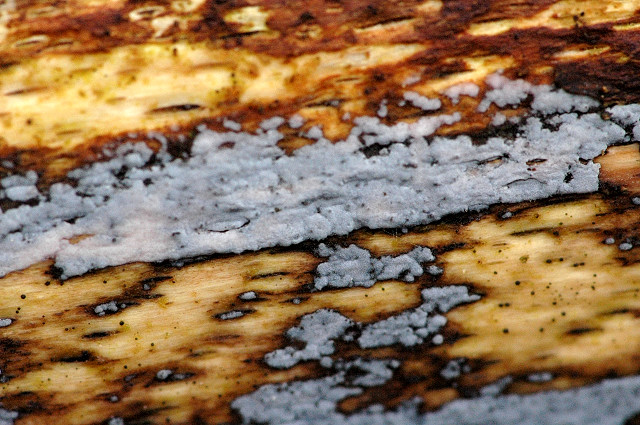
- Tulasnella violea

Scientific classification
- Kingdom: Fungi
- Division: Basidiomycota
- Class: Agaricomycetes
- Order: Cantharellales
- Family: Tulasnellaceae
- Genus: Tulasnella; J.Schröt. (1888)

Type species
- Tulasnella lilacina J.Schröt. (1888)

Synonyms
- Hormomyces Bonord. (1851); Pachysterigma Johan-Olsen ex Bref. (1888); Prototremella Pat. (1888); Muciporus Juel (1897); Gloeotulasnella Höhn. & Litsch. (1908); Hormisciopsis Sumst. (1914); Epulorhiza R.T. Moore (1987)

= Tulasnella =

Genus of fungi

Tulasnella is a genus of effused (patch-forming) fungi in the order Cantharellales. Basidiocarps (fruit bodies), when visible, are typically smooth, ceraceous (waxy) to subgelatinous, frequently lilaceous to violet-grey, and formed on the underside of fallen branches and logs. They are microscopically distinct in having basidia with grossly swollen sterigmata (or epibasidia) on which basidiospores are formed. One atypical species, Tulasnella aurantiaca, produces orange to red, gelatinous, pustular anamorphs on wood. Some species form facultative mycorrhizas with orchids and liverworts. Around 80 species of Tulasnella are known worldwide.

== Taxonomy ==
=== History ===
Tulasnella was originally circumscribed by German mycologist Joseph Schröter in 1888, partly based on an earlier illustration by Charles Tulasne, after whom the new genus was named. Schröter believed the unusual basidia sufficiently distinct to warrant the creation of a new genus which he considered intermediate between Sebacina (then used for most effused "heterobasidiomycetes" with septate basidia) and Thelephora (then used for many effused "holobasidiomycetes" with conventional non-septate basidia). The genus was subsequently placed among the "heterobasidiomycetes" by most authors.

Between 1909 and 1928, French mycologists Hubert Bourdot and Amédée Galzin described more than a dozen new species of Tulasnella from collections made in France. In the USA, American mycologist D.P Rogers published a review of the Tulasnellaceae in 1933 in which he extended the definition of Gloeotulasnella, originally established to accommodate cystidiate species, to include "all mucous forms", though Gloeotulasnella was subsequently considered synonymous with Tulasnella by most authors. Later, in Australia, Jack Warcup and P.H.B. Talbot described several new Tulasnella species isolated from orchid mycorrhizas. In 1987 American mycologist Royall T. Moore proposed the new genus Epulorhiza for anamorphic (hyphal) states of Tulasnella previously referred to the form genus Rhizoctonia. In the UK in the 1990s, Peter Roberts described additional new species of Tulasnella and monographed the genus in a series of papers with a worldwide key to species.

=== Current status ===
Molecular research, based on cladistic analysis of DNA sequences, has confirmed Tulasnella as a distinct genus, but has placed it within the Cantharellales rather than in its own order the Tulasnellales.

Following changes to the International Code of Nomenclature for algae, fungi, and plants, the practice of giving different names to teleomorph and anamorph forms of the same fungus has been discontinued, meaning that Epulorhiza has become a synonym of the earlier name Tulasnella. As a result, existing anamorphic species have been transferred to Tulasnella and new anamorphic species have been described in this genus.

Molecular research has also shown that the anamorphic, pustular, wood-inhabiting genus Hormomyces is a synonym of Tulasnella, not Tremella as previously thought.

An updated morphological key to species was published in 2016.

== Association with orchids ==
In 1899 French botanist Noël Bernard discovered that orchid seeds require a fungal associate to germinate and most if not all orchids maintain this mycorrhizal association with fungi throughout their lifecycle. In the 1960s, cultures derived from orchid mycorrhizas that were induced to form teleomorphs (fruit bodies) showed that Tulasnella species (together with Rhizoctonia species) were frequent associates of terrestrial orchids in Australia. Direct DNA sequencing of orchid mycorrhizas has confirmed this association on a global scale, for both terrestrial and epiphytic orchids. Most recently described anamorphic Tulasnella species have been isolated from orchid mycorrhizas, but many more await formal description.

== Association with liverworts ==
Molecular research has shown that thalloid liverworts in the family Aneuraceae associate frequently and perhaps exclusively with species of Tulasnella, ether in a mycorrhizal or parasitic relationship.

== Species ==
=== Species currently accepted by Species Fungorum ===
- Tulasnella aggregata (L.S. Olive) L.S. Olive (1957)
- Tulasnella albertensis (Currah & Zelmer) J. Mack & P. Roberts (2021)
- Tulasnella albida Bourdot & Galzin (1928)
- Tulasnella allantospora Wakef. & A. Pearson (1923)
- Tulasnella amonilioides (P.R.M. Almeida, N. Van den Berg & Góes-Neto) S. Fujimori, J.P. Abe, I. Okane & Y. Yamaoka (2019)
- Tulasnella anaticula (Currah) S. Fujimori, J.P. Abe, I. Okane & Y. Yamaoka (2019)
- Tulasnella andina D. Cruz, J.P. Suárez & M. Piepenbr. (2015)
- Tulasnella anguifera P. Roberts (1992)
- Tulasnella asymmetrica Warcup & P.H.B. Talbot (1967)
- Tulasnella aurantiaca (Bonord.) J. Mack & Seifert (2021)
- Tulasnella australiensis Arifin, T.W. May & C.C. Linde (2021)
- Tulasnella balearica P. Roberts (1996)
- Tulasnella bifrons Bourdot & Galzin (1924)
- Tulasnella bourdotii Jülich (1982)
- Tulasnella brinkmannii Bres. (1920)
- Tulasnella bucina Duhem & Schultheis (2014)
- Tulasnella calendulina (Zelmer & Currah) J. Mack & P. Roberts (2021)
- Tulasnella calospora (Boud.) Juel (1897)
- Tulasnella concentrica Arifin, T.W. May & C.C. Linde (2021)
- Tulasnella conidiata L.S. Olive (1957)
- Tulasnella convivalis Trichies (2007)
- Tulasnella cruciata Warcup & P.H.B. Talbot (1971)
- Tulasnella cumulopuntioides S. Fujimori, J.P. Abe, I. Okane & Y. Yamaoka (2018)
- Tulasnella curvispora Donk (1966)
- Tulasnella cystidiophora Höhn. & Litsch. (1906)
- Tulasnella danica Hauerslev (1987)
- Tulasnella deliquescens (Juel) Juel (1914)
- Tulasnella dendritica S. Fujimori, J.P. Abe, I. Okane & Y. Yamaoka (2018)
- Tulasnella densa Arifin, T.W. May & C.C. Linde (2021)
- Tulasnella dissitispora P. Roberts (1994)
- Tulasnella echinospora P. Roberts (2004)
- Tulasnella eichleriana Bres. (1903)
- Tulasnella ellipsoidea S. Fujimori, J.P. Abe, I. Okane & Y. Yamaoka (2018)
- Tulasnella epiphytica (O.L. Pereira, Rollemb. & Kasuya) J. Mack & P. Roberts (2021)
- Tulasnella eremophila M. Dueñas, Tellería & M.P. Martín (2015)
- Tulasnella falcifera P. Roberts (1992)
- Tulasnella fuscoviolacea Bres. (1900)
- Tulasnella griseorubella Litsch. (1933)
- Tulasnella guttulata L.S. Olive (1957)
- Tulasnella helicospora Raunk. (1918)
- Tulasnella hyalina Höhn. & Litsch. (1908)
- Tulasnella inclusa (M.P. Christ.) Donk (1966)
- Tulasnella inquilinia (Currah, Zettler & McInnis) J. Mack & P. Roberts (2021)
- Tulasnella interrogans P. Roberts (1992)
- Tulasnella irregularis Warcup & P.H.B. Talbot (1980)
- Tulasnella kiataensis Arifin, Reiter, T.W. May & C.C. Linde (2022)
- Tulasnella kirschneri D. Cruz, J.P. Suárez & M. Piepenbr. (2015)
- Tulasnella kongoensis P. Roberts (1997)
- Tulasnella korungensis Arifin, T.W. May & C.C. Linde (2022)
- Tulasnella lilacina J. Schröt. (1888)
- Tulasnella multinucleata Arifin, T.W. May & C.C. Linde (2022)
- Tulasnella nerrigaensis Arifin, T.W. May & C.C. Linde (2022)
- Tulasnella occidentalis Arifin, T.W. May & C.C. Linde (2021)
- Tulasnella pacifica L.S. Olive (1957)
- Tulasnella pallida Bres. (1903)
- Tulasnella pallidocremea Jülich (1976)
- Tulasnella papillata (L.S. Olive) L.S. Olive (1957)
- Tulasnella permacra P. Roberts (1993)
- Tulasnella phuhinrongklaensis Rachanarin, Suwannar. & Lumyong (2018)
- Tulasnella pinicola Bres. (1903)
- Tulasnella prima C.C. Linde & T.W. May (2017)
- Tulasnella pruinosa Bourdot & Galzin (1924)
- Tulasnella punctata Arifin, T.W. May & C.C. Linde (2021)
- Tulasnella quasiflorens P. Roberts (1994)
- Tulasnella robusta Gresl. & Rajchenb. (2001)
- Tulasnella rogersii (L.S. Olive) L.S. Olive (1957)
- Tulasnella rosea Arifin, T.W. May & C.C. Linde (2021)
- Tulasnella saveloides P. Roberts (1993)
- Tulasnella secunda C.C. Linde & T.W. May (2017)
- Tulasnella sphaerospora G.W. Martin (1939)
- Tulasnella sphagneti C.C. Linde & T.W. May (2017)
- Tulasnella subasymmetrica Arifin, Reiter, T.W. May & C.C. Linde (2022)
- Tulasnella subglobospora Hjortstam (1983)
- Tulasnella thelephorea (Juel) Juel (1914)
- Tulasnella tomaculum P. Roberts (1993)
- Tulasnella traumatica (Bourdot & Galzin) Sacc. & Trotter (1912)
- Tulasnella valentini Van de Put (1997)
- Tulasnella vernicosa Bourdot & Galzin (1928)
- Tulasnella tubericola K. Solís, Barriuso, Garcés-Claver & V. González (2017)
- Tulasnella violea (Quél.) Bourdot & Galzin (1909)
- Tulasnella warcupii C.C. Linde & T.W. May (2017)
- Tulasnella zooctonia Drechsler (1969)

=== Species currently regarded as synonyms by Species Fungorum ===
- T. albolilacea Bourdot & Galzin (1924) = Tulasnella pallida
- T. anceps Bres., Syd. & P. Syd. (1910) = Rhizoctonia anceps, Ceratobasidiaceae
- T. araneosa Bourdot & Galzin (1924) = Tulasnella pruinosa
- T. caroliniana (L.S. Olive) L.S. Olive (1957) = Tulasnella allantospora
- T. cinchonae Racib. (1909) - Rhizoctonia species, Ceratobasidiaceae
- T. cremea Jülich (1982) = Tulasnella thelephorea
- T. eichleriana var. lilaceocinerea Bourdot & Donk (1930) = Tulasnella eichleriana
- T. grisea (Racib.) Sacc. & P. Syd. (1902) = Rhizoctonia solani, Ceratobasidiaceae
- T. incarnata sensu auct. = Tulasnella violea
- T. inclusa sensu auct. = Tulasnella thelephorea
- T. intrusa Hauerslev (1989) = Tulasnella albida
- T. lactea Bourdot & Galzin (1924) = Tulasnella eichleriana
- T. lividogrisea Rick (1934) = Auriculariales species
- T. metallica Rick (1934) = Scotomyces subviolaceus, Ceratobasidiaceae
- T. microspora Wakef. & A. Pearson (1923) = Tulasnella eichleriana
- T. obscura Bourdot & Galzin (1924) = Tulasnella eichleriana
- T. rosella Bourdot & Galzin (1924) = Tulasnella deliquescens
- T. rubropallens Bourdot & Galzin (1924) = Tulasnella allantospora
- T. sordida Bourdot & Galzin (1924) = Tulasnella pinicola
- T. tremelloides Wakef. & A. Pearson (1918) = Tulasnella pinicola
- T. violacea sensu auct. = Tulasnella pallida
- T. vitrea Rick (1934) = Basidiodendron species, Auriculariales
