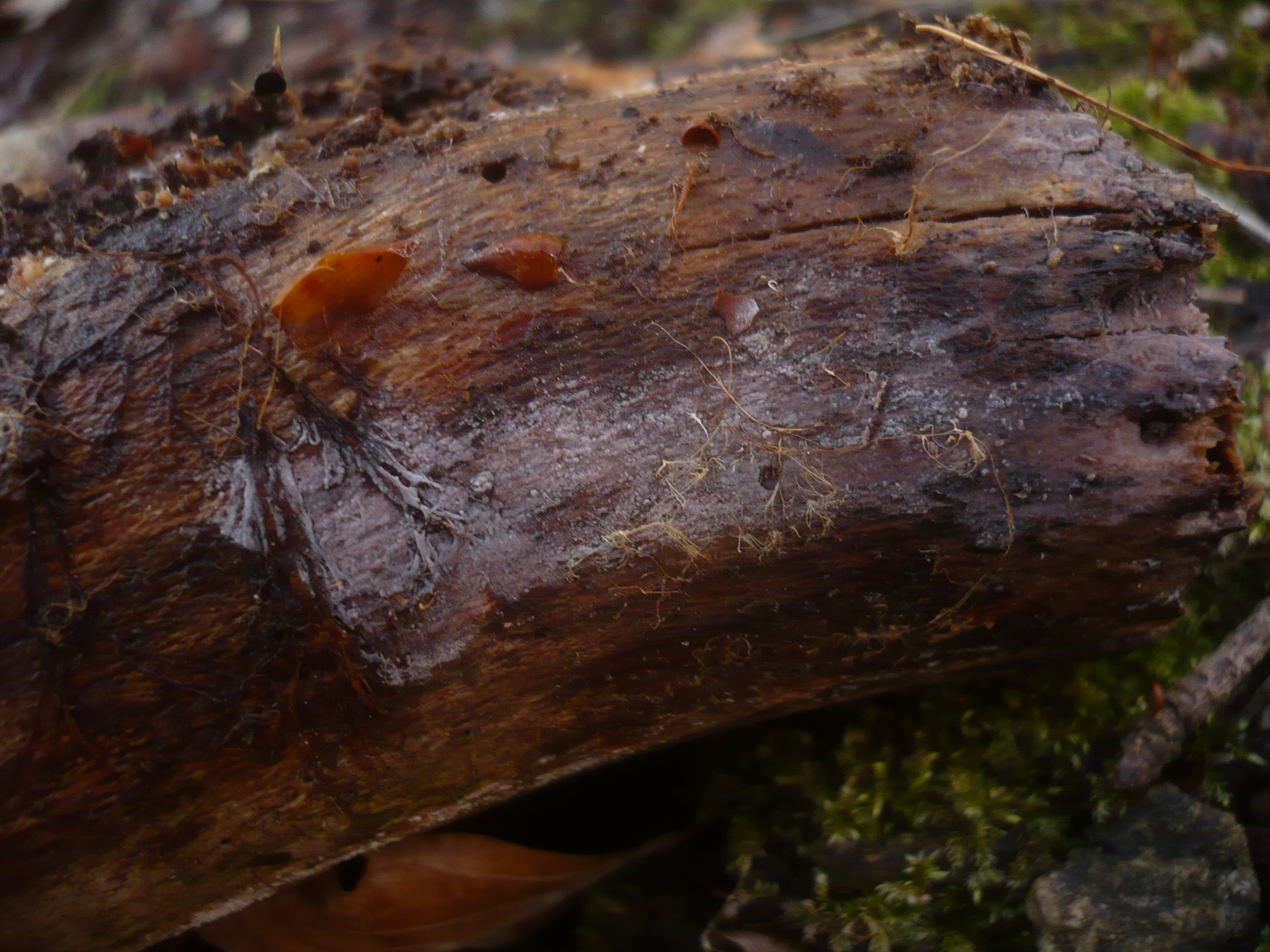
- Tulasnella violea, Austria

Scientific classification
- Domain: Eukaryota
- Kingdom: Fungi
- Division: Basidiomycota
- Class: Agaricomycetes
- Order: Cantharellales
- Family: Tulasnellaceae
- Genus: Tulasnella
- Species: T. violea

Binomial name
- Tulasnella violea (Quél.) Bourdot & Galzin (1909)

Synonyms
- Hypochnus violeus Quél. (1883); Corticium violeum (Quél.) Costantin & L.M. Dufour (1891)

= Tulasnella violea =

Species of fungus

Tulasnella violea is a species of fungus in the order Cantharellales. Basidiocarps (fruit bodies) are typically smooth, ceraceous (waxy), violet-pink or lilaceous to grey, and occur on the underside of fallen branches and logs. It is one of the more conspicuous Tulasnella species and appears to be distributed worldwide. Though normally saprotrophic, Tulasnella violea can form a mycorrhizal association with orchids.

== Taxonomy ==
The species was originally described in 1883 by French mycologist Lucien Quélet who emphasized the lilac-pink colour of the fruit bodies and gave basidiospore measurements, but failed to notice the distinctive basidia and placed it among the corticioid fungi in the old form genus Hypochnus. The species was transferred to Tulasnella by French mycologists Hubert Bourdot and Amédée Galzin in 1909. In his 1933 review of the Tulasnellaceae American mycologist Donald P. Rogers extended the concept of T. violea, which he considered "highly variable", to include as synonyms a number of previously described species including T. eichleriana and T. thelephorea. In a 1994 revision of species, British mycologist Peter Roberts rejected Rogers' synonymy, but noted that differences in spore sizes suggested it was "possible that more than one taxon is involved" under the name T. violea.

Molecular research, based on cladistic analysis of DNA sequences, has confirmed T. violea represents a species distinct from T. eichleriana, though type specimens have not yet been sequenced. According to a 2016 paper, it remains possible that "more than one taxon is involved" under the name T. violea.

== Description ==
Basidiocarps (fruit bodies) are effused, smooth, ceraceous (waxy), violet-pink to grey. Microscopically the hyphae are 3.5–5(−7) μm wide, lacking clamp connections. The basidia are mostly clavate, 8–16 x 5–9 μm. The sterigmata are globose to ellipsoid, becoming clavate, fusiform, or mitriform (mitre-shaped), 4.5–6.5 μm wide, variously extending up to 35 μm long. The majority of basidiospores are globose to broadly ellipsoid, 5.5–9 x 5.5–7.5 μm. The anamorph produces monilioid hyphae (chains of swollen hyphal compartments), with compartments up to 8.5 μm diam.
