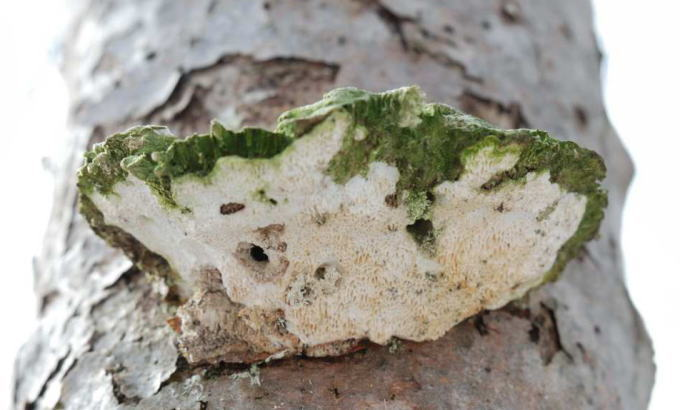
- Oxyporus populinus

Scientific classification
- Kingdom: Fungi
- Division: Basidiomycota
- Class: Agaricomycetes
- Order: Hymenochaetales
- Family: Schizoporaceae
- Genus: Oxyporus (Bourdot & Galzin) Donk (1933)

Type species
- Oxyporus populinus (Schumach.) Donk (1933)

Synonyms
- Boudiera Lázaro Ibiza (1917); Coriolus sect. Oxyporus Bourdot & Galzin (1925)

= Oxyporus =

Genus of fungi

Oxyporus is a genus of polypore fungi in the family Schizoporaceae. An individual family Oxyporaceae was described for the genus. A number of species in this genus are plant pathogens, causing a white rot. The genus is widely distributed.

== Taxonomy ==
Oxyporus was first classified as a section of the genus Coriolus by Hubert Bourdot & Amédée Galzin in 1925. Marinus Anton Donk promoted the section to generic status in 1933. Boudiera, a genus proposed by Lázaro Ibiza in 1917, is a synonym. The type species is Oxyporus populinus.

== Description ==
The fruit bodies of Oxyporus species can exist in either a pileate (with cap and stipe) form, or a resupinate form (like a crust on the surface of the substrate). In the latter case, the crust is typically broadly attached to the substrate and has a fibrous to woody texture. Pileate fruit bodies are white to deep cream in color, have a velvety texture, and are frequently covered with mosses. The pore surface is white to light yellowish, with pores that are small and isodiametric, rarely large and angular. The tube layer is single or divided into distant layers, in which case it has layers of tissue between the tube layers. The flesh is white to cream. The hyphal system is monomitic; the generative hyphae are thin to thick-walled and sparingly branched. Most species have and abundance of simple septate cystidia that are encrusted at the tip. Basidiospores are spherical to broadly ellipsoid, thin- to thick-walled, smooth, hyaline, and have a negative reaction to Melzer's reagent. Species of Oxyporus grow on both conifers and hardwoods, causing a white rot.

== Pathogenicity ==
Oxyporus corticola has been isolated from the lymphocutaneous tissues of a beagle and a German Shepherd. The risk factors for infection with O. corticola are not yet known.

== Uses ==
Oxyporus latemarginatus produces the industrially significant enzymes lignin peroxidase and manganese peroxidase (but not laccase), which are used in bioremediation, biopulping, and biobleaching. The fungus was investigated for its ability to degrade lignin in kenaf (Hibiscus cannabinus) chips. This species also produces an antifungal compound, 5-pentyl-2-furaldehyde, that inhibits the mycelial growth of Alternaria alternata, Botrytis cinerea, Colletotrichum gloeosporioides, Fusarium oxysporum f. sp. lycopersici, and Rhizoctonia solani by mycofumigation. It has been investigated for use as a biofumigant.

== Species ==
- Oxyporus andinus
- Oxyporus borealis
- Oxyporus brunneus
- Oxyporus bucholtzii
- Oxyporus cervinogilvus
- Oxyporus cinnamomeus
- Oxyporus connatus
- Oxyporus corticola
- Oxyporus cuneatus
- Oxyporus fragilis
- Oxyporus ginkgonis
- Oxyporus lacerus
- Oxyporus latemarginatus
- Oxyporus lilaceus
- Oxyporus macroporus
- Oxyporus mollis
- Oxyporus neotropicus
- Oxyporus obducens
- Oxyporus pellicula
- Oxyporus phellodendri
- Oxyporus piceicola
- Oxyporus populinus
- Oxyporus ravidus
- Oxyporus rufipusillus
- Oxyporus schizoporoides
- Oxyporus similis
- Oxyporus sinensis
- Oxyporus spiculifer
- Oxyporus subflavus
- Oxyporus subpopulinus
- Oxyporus subulatus
