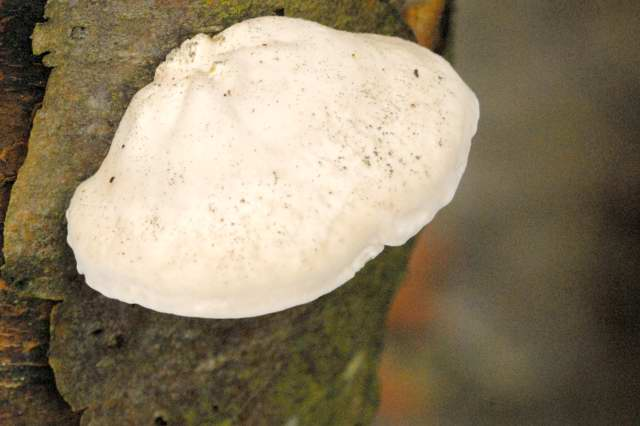

Scientific classification
- Kingdom: Fungi
- Division: Basidiomycota
- Class: Agaricomycetes
- Order: Polyporales
- Family: Incrustoporiaceae
- Genus: Tyromyces
- Species: T. chioneus

Binomial name
- Tyromyces chioneus (Fr.) P.Karst. (1881)

Synonyms
- Boletus candidus Pers. (1801); Polyporus chioneus Fr. (1815); Polyporus albellus Peck (1878); Bjerkandera chionea (Fr.) P.Karst. (1881); Leptoporus chioneus (Fr.) Quél. (1886); Polystictus chioneus (Fr.) Gillot & Lucand (1890); Ungularia chionea (Fr.) Lázaro Ibiza (1916); Leptoporus albellus (Peck) Bourdot & L.Maire (1920); Leptoporus albellus subsp. chioneus (Fr.) Bourdot & Galzin (1925); Leptoporus lacteus f. albellus (Peck) Pilát (1938); Tyromyces albellus (Peck) Bondartsev& Singer (1941)

= Tyromyces chioneus =

Species of fungus

Tyromyces chioneus
- Mycological characteristics
- Pores on hymenium
- No distinct cap or convex
- Hymenium attachment is irregular or not applicable
- Lacks a stipe
- Spore print is white
- Ecology is saprotrophic
- Edibility is unknown

Tyromyces chioneus, commonly known as the white cheese polypore, is a species of polypore fungus. A widely distributed fungus, it has a circumpolar distribution, in temperate boreal pine forests, of Asia, Europe, and North America, causes white rot in dead hardwood trees, especially birch.

== Taxonomy ==
The species was first described as Polyporus chioneus by Elias Fries in 1815. It was transferred to the genus Tyromyces by Petter Karsten in 1881. Tyromyces chioneus is the type species of Tyromyces. The specific epithet chioneus means "snow", referring to its white color. It is commonly known as the "white cheese polypore".

== Description ==
The fruit bodies are semicircular to fan-shaped brackets that measure up to 8 cm (3 in) deep by 12 cm (5 in) wide, with a thickness of 0.5–2 cm (1/4–3/4 in). The upper surface is initially white before aging to yellowish or grayish, and has a texture ranging from smooth to tomentose. The undersurface features white to cream-colored, round to angular pores measuring 3–4 per millimeter. The flesh is soft and fleshy when young, but becomes hard and brittle in age or when dry. It has a mild or indistinct taste and a pleasant odor.

It has a white spore print and the spores are smooth, cylindrical, hyaline (translucent), with dimensions of 4–5 by 1.5–2 μm. The basidia are club-shaped, four-spored, and measure 10–15 by 4–5 μm; they have a clamp at their base. The hyphal system is dimitic, consisting of generative and skeletal hyphae. The generative hyphae have clamps and are intricately branched. The skeletal hyphae, in contrast, are thick-walled, rarely branched, and measure 2–4.5 μm in diameter. Although cystidia are absent from the hymenium, there are fused cystidioles (immature cystidia) measuring 15–20 by 4–5 μm.

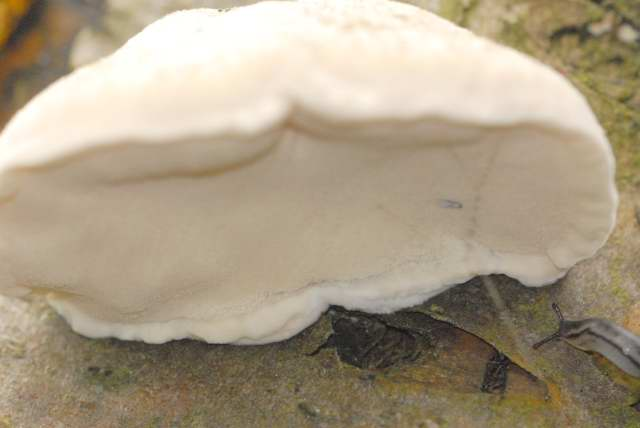
Pore surface

== Distribution and ecology ==
Tyromyces chioneus has a circumpolar distribution, in temperate boreal pine forests, including Asia, Europe, and North America.

It causes white rot in dead hardwood trees. Its most common host is birch. In Greenland, it is common on Betula pubescens.

This fungus has been recorded as a favored food of the pleasing fungus beetle Aporotritoma pulchra.

== Potential uses ==
The species is inedible.

Cultures of the fungus have been shown to contain a sesquiterpene with anti-HIV activity in laboratory experiments.
