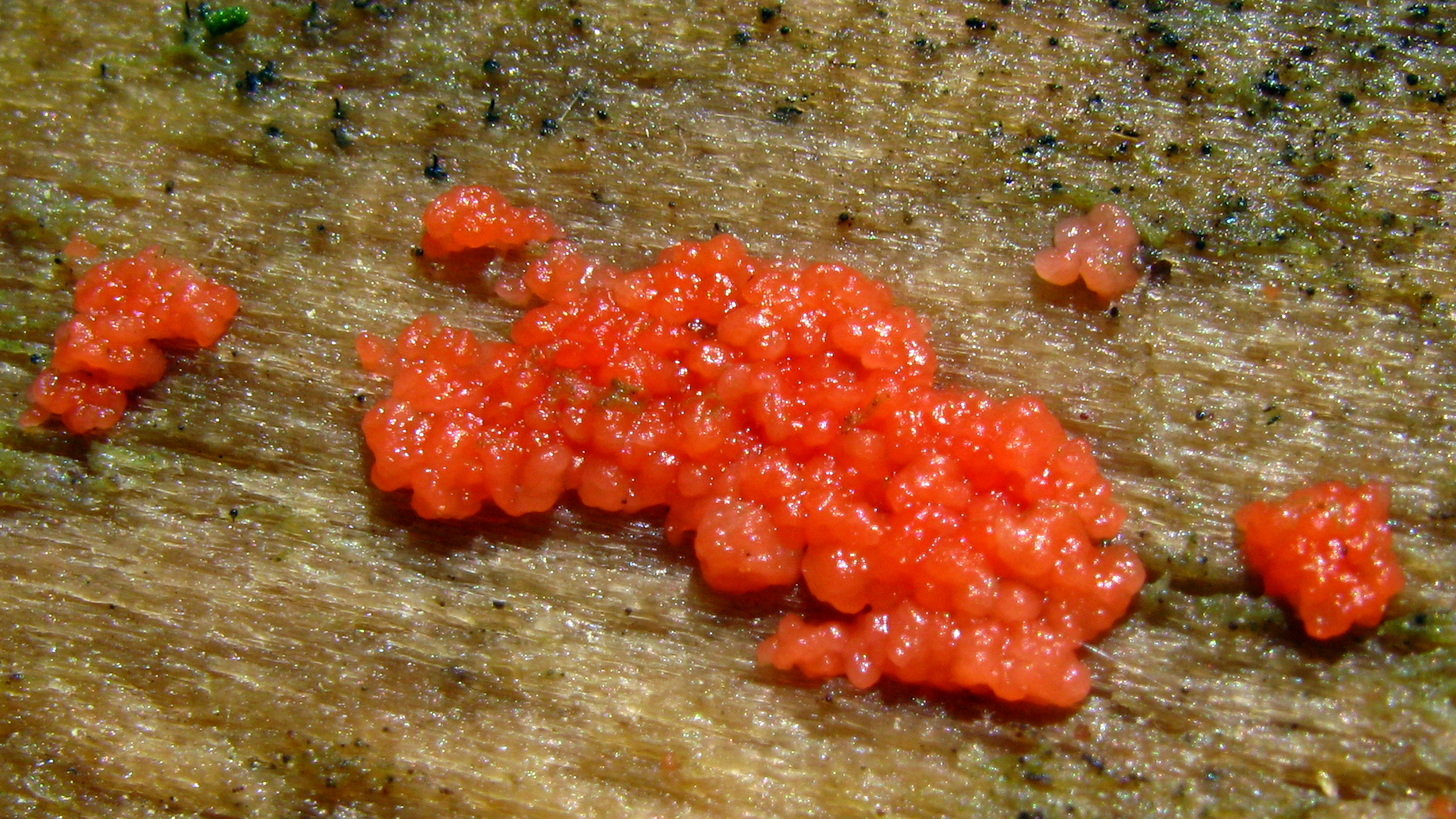
- Tulasnella aurantiaca, Ohio, USA

Scientific classification
- Kingdom: Fungi
- Division: Basidiomycota
- Class: Agaricomycetes
- Order: Cantharellales
- Family: Tulasnellaceae
- Genus: Tulasnella
- Species: T. aurantiaca

Binomial name
- Tulasnella aurantiaca (Bonord.) J. Mack & Seifert (2021)

Synonyms
- Hormomyces aurantiacus Bonord. (1851); Hypsilophora callorioides Kalchbr. & Cooke (1880); Hypsilophora fragiformis Cooke (1880); Hormomyces callorioides (Kalchbr. & Cooke) Sacc. (1888); Hormomyces fragiformis (Cooke) Sacc. (1888); Hormisciopsis gelatinosa Sumst. (1914)

= Tulasnella aurantiaca =

Species of fungus

Tulasnella aurantiaca is a species of fungus in the order Cantharellales. It produces orange-red, pustular, gelatinous anamorphic states on dead, deciduous wood. Originally described from Europe, it also occurs in North America where the species appears to be more common.

== Taxonomy ==
Tulasnella aurantiaca was first published in 1851 by German mycologist Hermann Friedrich Bonorden who placed it in a new genus, Hormomyces. Microscopically, the species produces branched chains of hyaline, globose conidia and no teleomorphic (basidia-bearing) state is known. As a result, its disposition and relationships have long been uncertain. French mycologist Narcisse Théophile Patouillard suggested that Hormomyces aurantiacus was an anamorph of a Dacrymyces species. Italian mycologist Pier Andrea Saccardo later suggested that H. aurantiacus might be the anamorph of Tremella mesenterica, a view accepted by influential Dutch mycologist M.A. Donk. Molecular research, based on cladistic analysis of DNA sequences, has, however, shown that the species is an anamorphic member of the genus Tulasnella.
