= Galzinia =

Scientific classification
- Kingdom: Fungi
- Division: Basidiomycota
- Class: Agaricomycetes
- Genus: Galzinia; Bourdot (1922)

Type species
- Galzinia pedicellata Bourdot (1922)

Species
- G. cymosa G. cystidiata G. ellipsospora G. forcipata G. geminispora G. longibasidia G. oberwinkleri G. vesana

Genus of fungi

Galzinia is a genus of fungi in the class Agaricomycetes. Basidiocarps (fruit bodies) are thin, effused, corticioid, and typically occur on rotten, fallen wood. Molecular research, based on cladistic analysis of DNA sequences, suggests the genus may be polyphyletic. The type species has not yet been sequenced, but Galzinia longibasidia belongs in the Polyporales.
