= Charles Tulasne =

French painter

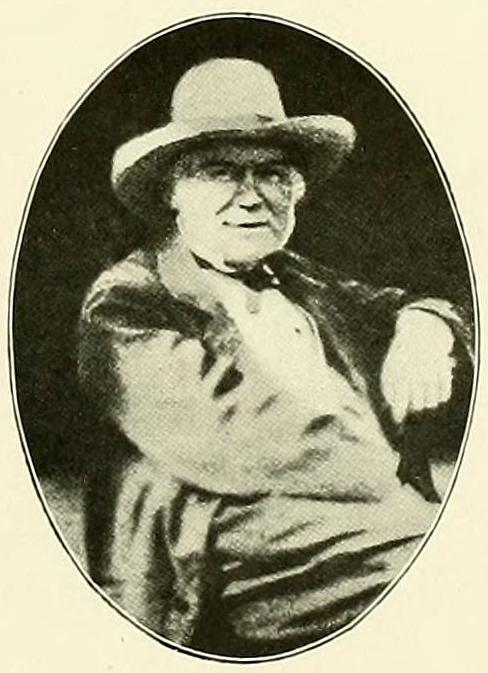
- Born: 5 September 1816; Langeais, France
- Died: 28 August 1884 (aged 67); Hyères, France
- Scientific career
- Fields: Physician; Mycology

Charles Tulasne (5 September 1816 – 28 August 1884) was a French medical doctor, mycologist and illustrator born in Langeais in the département of Indre-et-Loire.

He received his medical doctorate in 1840 and practiced medicine in Paris until 1854. Afterwards he worked with his older brother Louis René Tulasne (1815–1885) in the field of mycology. He died in Hyères, département of Var.

In addition to assisting his brother with the classification and study of fungi, Charles Tulasne collaborated with Louis on numerous scientific publications. He is known for his excellent illustrations, particularly in the three-volume Selecta Fungorum Carpologia. Regarding the artistic quality of his work, Charles Tulasne is sometimes referred to as "The Audubon of Fungi".

In 1872, Joseph Schröter circumscribed a genus of effused (patch-forming) fungi in the Tulasnellaceae family, Tulasnella was named in Tulasne's honour.
