= Fomitella =

Scientific classification
- Kingdom: Fungi
- Division: Basidiomycota
- Class: Agaricomycetes
- Order: Polyporales
- Family: Fomitopsidaceae
- Genus: Fomitella; Murrill (1905)

Type species
- Fomitella supina (Sw.) Murrill (1905)

Species
- Fomitella fumosipora Fomitella malaysiana Fomitella rhodophaea Fomitella supina

Genus of fungi

Fomitella is a genus of fungi in the family Fomitopsidaceae. The genus was described in 1905 by American mycologist William Alphonso Murrill with F. supina as the type species.
