= Oxyporus latemarginatus =

Scientific classification
- Kingdom: Fungi
- Division: Basidiomycota
- Class: Agaricomycetes
- Order: Hymenochaetales
- Family: Schizoporaceae
- Genus: Oxyporus
- Species: O. latemarginatus

Binomial name
- Oxyporus latemarginatus (Durieu & Mont.) Donk (1966)

Synonyms
- Chaetoporus ambiguus (Bres.) Bondartsev & Singer (1941); Irpex concrescens Lloyd (1915); Polyporus cokeri Murrill (1920); Polyporus latemarginatus Durieu & Mont. (1856); Polyporus roseitingens Murrill (1920); Poria ambigua Bres. (1897); Poria cokeri Murrill (1920); Poria excurrens var. macrostoma Speg. (1898); Poria geoderma Speg. (1898); Poria lacerata Murrill (1920); Poria latemarginata (Durieu & Mont.) Cooke (1886); Poria roseitingens Murrill (1920); Poria salicina Murrill (1920); Rigidoporus latemarginatus (Durieu & Mont.) Pouzar (1966); Trametes latemarginata (Durieu & Mont.) Pat. (1904)

Species of fungus

Oxyporus latemarginatus is a shelf fungus which is significant as a plant pathogen causing white rot in trees. It does not belong to the "true" shelf fungi or polypores (Polyporales), but instead to the more ancient Hymenochaetales.

This species is a favored food of adults and larvae of the widespread American pleasing fungus beetle Ischyrus quadripunctatus.

== See also ==
- List of apricot diseases
- List of avocado diseases
- List of citrus diseases
- List of peach and nectarine diseases
- List of Platanus diseases
- List of sweetgum diseases
