= Mesocriconema xenoplax =

Scientific classification
- Kingdom: Animalia
- Phylum: Nematoda
- Class: Chromadorea
- Order: Rhabditida
- Family: Criconematidae
- Genus: Mesocriconema
- Species: M. xenoplax

Binomial name
- Mesocriconema xenoplax (Raski, 1952)

Synonyms
- Criconemella xenoplax Criconemoides xenoplax Criconemoides nainitalense Macroposthonia nainitalensis Criconema pruni Macroposthonia pruni Mesocriconema pruni Criconemoides pruni

Species of roundworm

Mesocriconema xenoplax is a species of plant parasitic nematode. Nematodes of this particular species are collectively called ring nematodes.

== Hosts and symptoms ==
It has a wide host range, infecting many woody plants, and it is known to infect all species of the genus Prunus, which includes peach, almond, apricot, cherry, and plum. It also infects various other fruit trees, and grapes, in particular. There have been studies that have shown large concentrations of ring nematodes in peppermint, as well. Symptoms can include, but are not limited to: root-pruning, decreased nutrient uptake, vascular damage, possible death of shoots and limbs, and stunted plant growth. With the reduced nutrient uptake, some cases have shown that the change in ratio if carbon:nitrogen can make plants infected by ring nematodes more susceptible to bacterial canker cause by Pseudomonas syringae, (Lownsberry, et al. 1977).

== Anatomy and morphology ==
Ring nematodes are easily distinguished by distinctive coarse ridges, known as annulations, around the body.

Females have a long, wide stylet, and have "knobs" that allow for the attachment of the stylet muscles. Head is broad, and the lip region shape is variable and sometimes there are four extra submedial lobes. The tail is broadly round, and the terminus is most often a small, simple, rounded button. The vulva is very distinctly open, and appears more posterior than usual.

Male ring nematodes tend to be much thinner than females, and they lack a stylet. They also lack a distinct esophagus, which renders them incapable of feeding. Their spicules are simple and slender, and can be straight or slightly curved.

Juveniles are much smaller than the adults, but tend to resemble adult females more than adult males.

== Life cycle ==
Ring nematodes live their lives as migratory ectoparasites. This means that they do not enter the plant cell, but instead use their large stylet to feed on the root tips from outside the plant. The nematode moves through pores in the soil, and finds a root to feed on. It inserts its stylet into an epidermal cell on the plant, feeds for a certain amount of time, then moves along to a different locations, and feeds on a different root.

Diagram showing the life cycle of plant parasitic nematode, Mesocriconema Xenoplax

General life cycle for Mesocriconema xenoplax and migratory ectoparasites:

1. Adult females deposit single eggs in the soil, every two to four days.
2. First molt occurs within the egg, taking a first stage juvenile (J1) to a second stage juvenile (J2).
3. Second stage juveniles (J2) hatch from the egg in 11–15 days.
4. Second stage juveniles (J2) molt to third stage juveniles (J3) in three to five days.
5. Third stage juveniles (J3) molt to fourth stage juveniles (J4) in four to seven days, then become adults five to six days later.
6. Adult females begin to lay eggs in two to three days. Males rarely observed.

== Environment and distribution ==
Ring nematodes has a very broad distribution range. It has been reported in six of the seven continents: North and South America, Europe, Africa, Australia, and Asia—most notably India and Japan. In the United States, it is especially prevalent in California, and on the west coast. Being a migratory ectoparasite, Mesocriconema xenoplax spends its life in the soil. It can be found in many different types of soil, including: highly porous soils, some silt and clay soils, and especially very sandy soils. It can be sensitive to dehydration and acidic soils, so soils that contain more moisture, and higher pH values, create the best environment.

== Economic importance ==
Mesocriconema xenoplax has a wide host range, so it can cause economic problems for a variety of plants. Ring nematodes can be extremely devastating to peach trees. Infection of ring nematodes can cause peach trees to be more susceptible to bacterial canker and cold damage. This leads to peach tree short life disease, thus vastly reducing peach yields. Along with peaches, it can cause problems with grapes as well. A survey of Swiss vineyards showed that ring nematodes were the most abundant and damaging nematode species that led to low yield. Another study found that 85% percent of vineyards in Oregon contained Mesocriconema xenoplax, and could cause anywhere from 33% yield loss to 78% percent yield loss. Some studies have shown damage and yield loss to pineapples, sugarcane, cherries, and almonds. One particular study showed that Mesocriconema xenoplax caused 40,000 hectares of almonds to suffer. losses in California. It has been known to cause damage to turf grasses, making it difficult on golf courses.

== Management ==
Some chemical ways to manage nematodes, especially in peach, are fumigation, and nematicides. Pre-plant fumigation should be used in areas that are none to be infected with nematodes, or more susceptible to ring nematode infestation. Nematicides can be used to help combat ring nematodes as well. Studies have found that both pre- plant, and post-plant nematicides have been able to manage ring nematodes, especially in peach species that are susceptible to bacterial canker and peach short tree life disease. Some non-chemical ways to control or manage ring nematodes are crop rotations, soil sanitation, and cultural practices such as removing plant debris, planting certified seeds, and the use of antagonistic cover crops. These are plants that release chemical compounds into the soil that are toxic to the nematodes. Host resistance to ring nematode has been hard to find. In order to control Mesocriconema xenoplax, the eggs that are laid by females would need to be eliminated. The nematodes overwinter and survive as eggs, so getting rid of them would help control ring nematodes.

== See also ==
- List of almond diseases
- List of apricot diseases
- List of pecan diseases
- List of peach and nectarine diseases
- List of Persian walnut diseases
- List of grape diseases
