= Warcupia =

Scientific classification
- Domain: Eukaryota
- Kingdom: Fungi
- Division: Ascomycota
- Class: Pezizomycetes
- Order: Pezizales
- Family: Pyronemataceae
- Genus: Warcupia; Paden & J.V.Cameron (1972)

Type species
- Warcupia terrestris Paden & J.V.Cameron (1972)

Genus of fungi

Warcupia is a genus of fungi in the family Pyronemataceae. A monotypic genus, it contains the single species Warcupia terrestris, first isolated from soil samples found near the University of Victoria campus, and also from soil from Sierra National Forest in Fresno County, California. The genus is named in honour of Dr. Jack Warcup.
