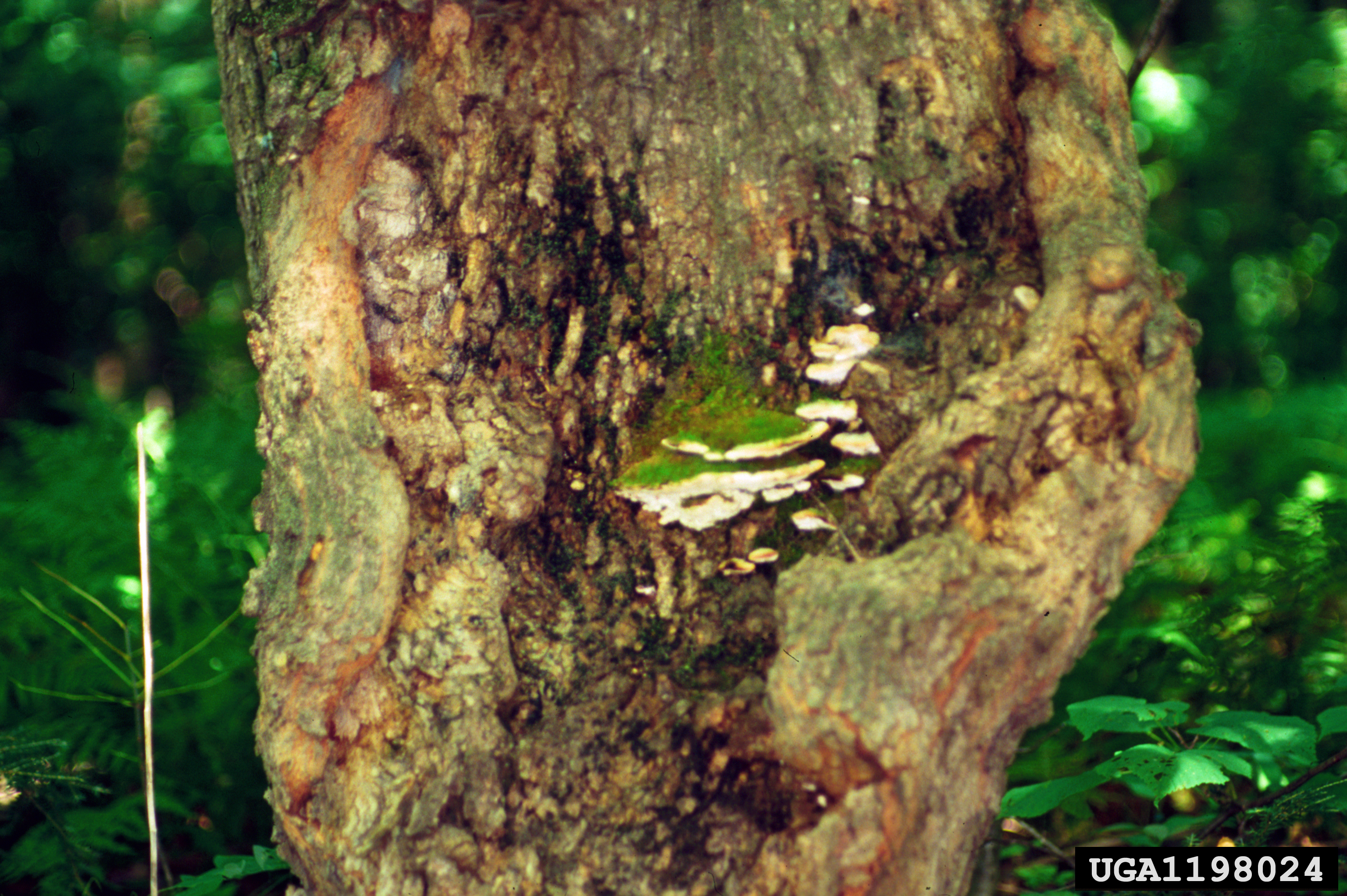
- Fruit bodies

Scientific classification
- Kingdom: Fungi
- Division: Basidiomycota
- Class: Agaricomycetes
- Order: Hymenochaetales
- Family: Schizoporaceae
- Genus: Oxyporus
- Species: O. populinus

Binomial name
- Oxyporus populinus (Schumach.) Donk (1933)

Synonyms
- List: Boletus populinus Schumach. (1803); Boudiera connata (Weinm.) Lázaro Ibiza (1916); Coriolus connatus (Weinm.) Quél. (1888); Flaviporus connatus (Weinm.) G.Cunn. (1965); Fomes connatus (Weinm.) Gillet (1878); Fomes populinus (Schumach.) Cooke (1885); Leptoporus connatus (Weinm.) Quél. (1886); Polyporus connatus Schwein. (1832); Polyporus connatus Weinm. (1826); Polyporus cremeus Bres. ex Lloyd (1915); Polyporus neesii var. connatus (Weinm.) Fr. (1828); Polyporus populinus (Schumach.) Fr. (1821); Rigidoporus populinus (Schumach.) Pouzar (1966); Rigidoporus populinus (Schumach.) Teixeira (1992); Scindalma connatum (Weinm.) Kuntze (1898); Scindalma populinum (Schumach.) Kuntze (1898); Trametes connata (Weinm.) Fr. (1849); Trametes populina (Schumach.) Fr. (1849); Trametes secretanii G.H.Otth (1866); Xanthochrous connatus (Schwein.) Pat. (1900)

= Oxyporus populinus =

Species of fungus

Oxyporus populinus, also known as the mossy maple polypore and poplar bracket, is a species of fungus in the family Schizoporaceae. It is a plant pathogen that affects trees.

It is typically white (sometimes gray near the center and/or pinkish near the margin), more or less semicircular, and 2.5–20 centimetres (1–8 in) wide, with tough flesh which is inedible.

== See also ==
- List of apricot diseases
- List of peach and nectarine diseases
- List of Platanus diseases
- List of sweetgum diseases
