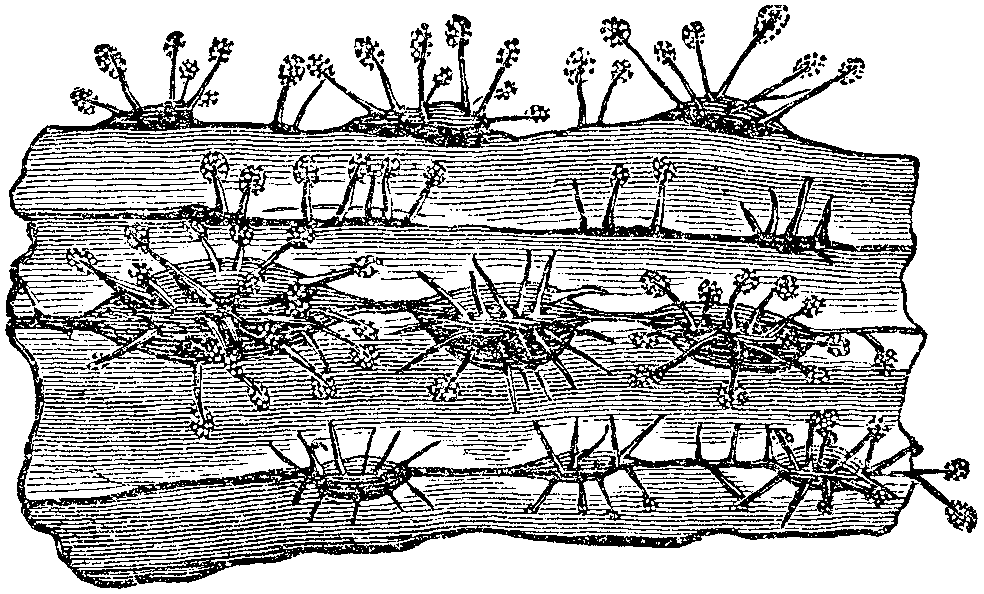
- Dematóphora necátrix [sic!], illustration #346 in M. Cilenšek: Naše škodljive rastline (1892)

Scientific classification
- Domain: Eukaryota
- Kingdom: Fungi
- Division: Ascomycota
- Class: Sordariomycetes
- Order: Xylariales
- Family: Xylariaceae
- Genus: Rosellinia
- Species: R. necatrix

Binomial name
- Rosellinia necatrix Berl. ex Prill. (1904)

Synonyms
- Dematophora necatrix R. Hartig (1883); Hypoxylon necatrix (Berl. ex Prill.) P.M.D. Martin (1976); Pleurographium necator (R. Hartig) Goid. (1935)

= Rosellinia necatrix =

Species of fungus

Rosellinia necatrix is a fungal plant pathogen infecting several hosts including apples, apricots, avocados, cassava, strawberries, pears, hop. citruses and Narcissus, causing white root rot.
