= Stilbotulasnella =

Scientific classification
- Kingdom: Fungi
- Division: Basidiomycota
- Class: Agaricomycetes
- Order: Cantharellales
- Family: Tulasnellaceae
- Genus: Stilbotulasnella; Oberw. & Bandoni (1982)

Type species
- Stilbotulasnella conidiophora Oberw. & Bandoni (1982)

Genus of fungi

Stilbotulasnella is a fungal genus in the Tulasnellaceae family. The genus is monotypic, containing the single species Stilbotulasnella conidiophora, found in Hawaii.
