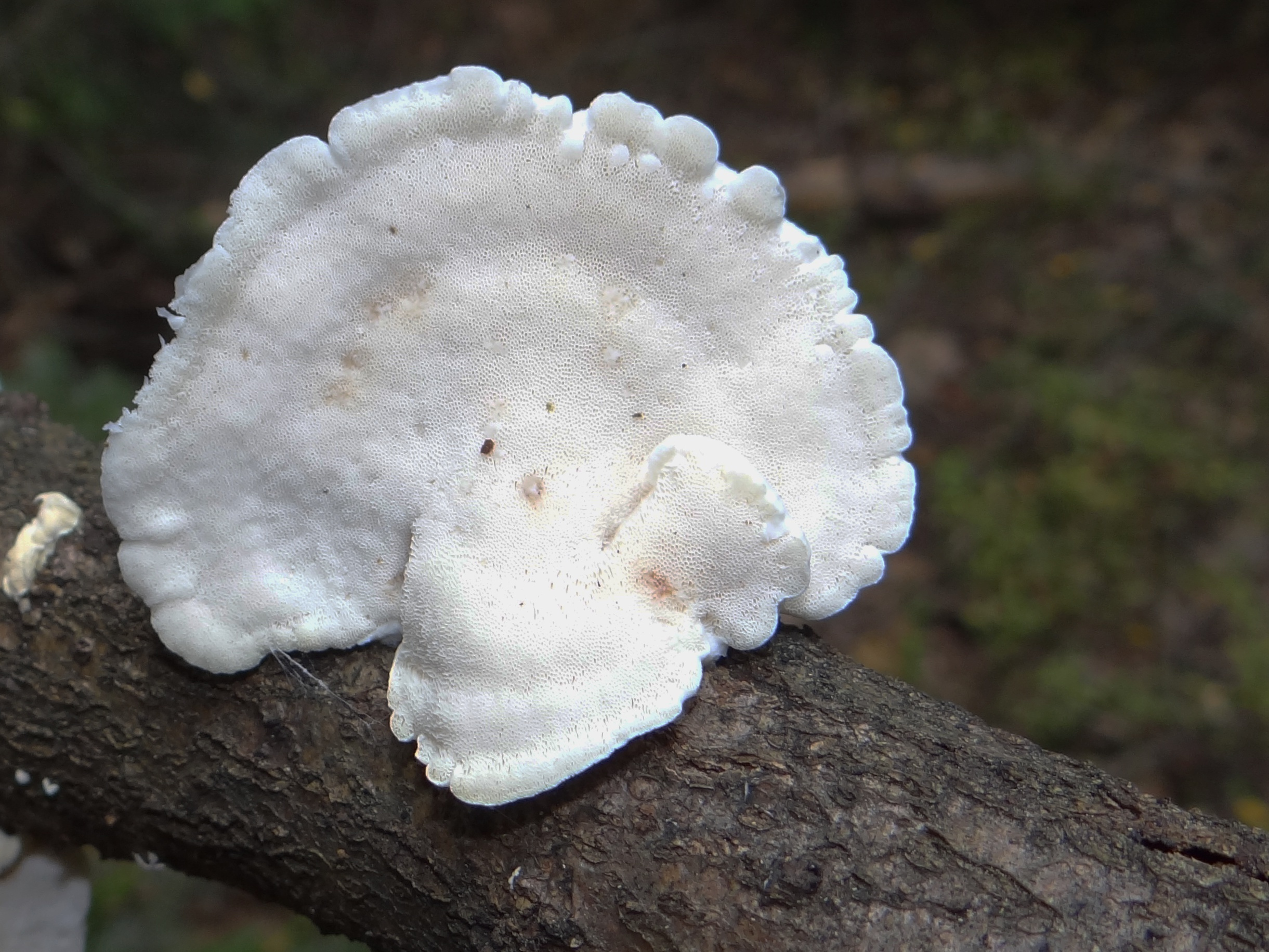
- Tyromyces chioneus

Scientific classification
- Kingdom: Fungi
- Division: Basidiomycota
- Class: Agaricomycetes
- Order: Polyporales
- Family: Incrustoporiaceae
- Genus: Tyromyces; P.Karst. (1881)

Type species
- Tyromyces chioneus (Fr.) P.Karst. (1881)

= Tyromyces =

Genus of fungi

Tyromyces is a genus of poroid fungi in the family Polyporaceae. It was circumscribed by mycologist Petter Karsten in 1881. The type species is the widely distributed Tyromyces chioneus, commonly known as the white cheese polypore. The phylogenetic position of Tyromyces within the Polyporales is uncertain, but it appears that it does not belong to the "core polyporoid clade". Tyromyces is polyphyletic as it is currently circumscribed, and has been described as "a dumping place for monomitic white-rot species with thin-walled spores."

The genus name is derived from the Ancient Greek words τυρός ("cheese") and μύχης (fungus").

== Description and ecology ==
Tyromyces fungi have fruit bodies that are pileate (i.e., with a cap) to resupinate (crust-like). Fruit bodies are short-lived, and often mostly white, but turning a darker colour when dry. The colour of the pore surface is usually white to cream, sometime with greenish tinges. Like the cap surface, it darkens when dry.

A fungus growing on a pine (Pinus) log was recorded as food of the little-known pleasing fungus beetle Haematochiton elateroides, and identified as a species of Antrodia. However, "A."odora – which was considered the most likely candidate for this particular fungus – is nowadays placed in Tyromyces, which among the Polyporales is not even particularly closely related to Antrodia. Meanwhile, the white cheese polypore T.chioneus is confirmed as a favored food of the pleasing fungus beetle Aporotritoma pulchra, a rather close relative of H.elateroides.

=== Microscopic characteristics ===
The hyphal system is either monomitic (meaning the fungus contains only generative hyphae, which in this case have clamps) or dimitic, containing both generative and skeletal hyphae. The spores are smooth, thin-walled, and hyaline (translucent). They are allantoid (long with rounded ends) to ovoid (egg-shaped), and are non-reactive with Melzer's reagent. There are no cystidia in the hymenium, although there may be cystidioles (sterile cells of about the same diameter and shape as an immature basidium that protrude beyond the surface of the hymenium).

Tyromyces are white rot fungi with a cosmopolitan distribution.

== Species ==
As of September 2016, Index Fungorum accepts 119 species of Tyromyces.

- Tyromyces albiformis Quanten (1997) – Papua New Guinea
- Tyromyces albogilvus (Berk. & M.A.Curtis) Murrill (1907)
- Tyromyces albovinaceus Corner (1989)
- Tyromyces albus Ryvarden (2013)
- Tyromyces allantoideus M.P.Christ. (1960) – Europe
- Tyromyces amarus (Hedgc.) J.Lowe (1975)
- Tyromyces apalus Bondartsev (1953)
- Tyromyces aquosus (Henn.) Ryvarden (2014) – Brazil
- Tyromyces armeniacus J.D.Zhao & X.Q.Zhang (1983) – China
- Tyromyces atroalbus (Rick) Rajchenb. (1987)
- Tyromyces atrostrigosus (Cooke) G.Cunn. (1965)
- Tyromyces aurantiacus (Komarova) Komarova (1964)
- Tyromyces avellaneialbus Murrill (1938)
- Tyromyces bibulus (Pers.) Bondartsev & Singer (1941)
- Tyromyces carbonicola Corner (1992)
- Tyromyces carpatorossicus (Pilát ex Pilát) Bondartsev (1953)
- Tyromyces catervatus (Berk.) G.Cunn. (1965)
- Tyromyces chioneus (Fr.) P.Karst. (1881)
- Tyromyces cinereobrunneus Bitew & Ryvarden (2004) – Ethiopia
- Tyromyces cinnamomeiporus Corner (1989)
- Tyromyces cinnamomeus M.Mata & Ryvarden (2010) – Costa Rica
- Tyromyces citriniporus Corner (1992)
- Tyromyces corniculatus Corner (1989)
- Tyromyces corticicola Corner (1989)
- Tyromyces crassisporus Log.-Leite & J.E.Wright (1991)
- Tyromyces crispellus (Peck) Murrill (1907)
- Tyromyces dacrydii Corner (1989)
- Tyromyces descendens Corner (1989)
- Tyromyces dianthicolor Corner (1989)
- Tyromyces duplexus M.Mata & Ryvarden (2010) – Costa Rica
- Tyromyces duracinus (Pat.) Murrill (1907) – South America
- Tyromyces eberhardtii (Pat.) Ryvarden (1983)
- Tyromyces ethiopicus Bitew & Ryvarden (2004) – Ethiopia
- Tyromyces exiguus (Colenso) G.Cunn. (1965)
- Tyromyces falcatus G.Cunn. (1965)
- Tyromyces favulus Corner (1989)
- Tyromyces formosanus T.T.Chang & W.N.Chou (1999)
- Tyromyces fumidiceps G.F.Atk. (1908) – North America
- Tyromyces galactinus (Berk.) J.Lowe (1975) – Portugal

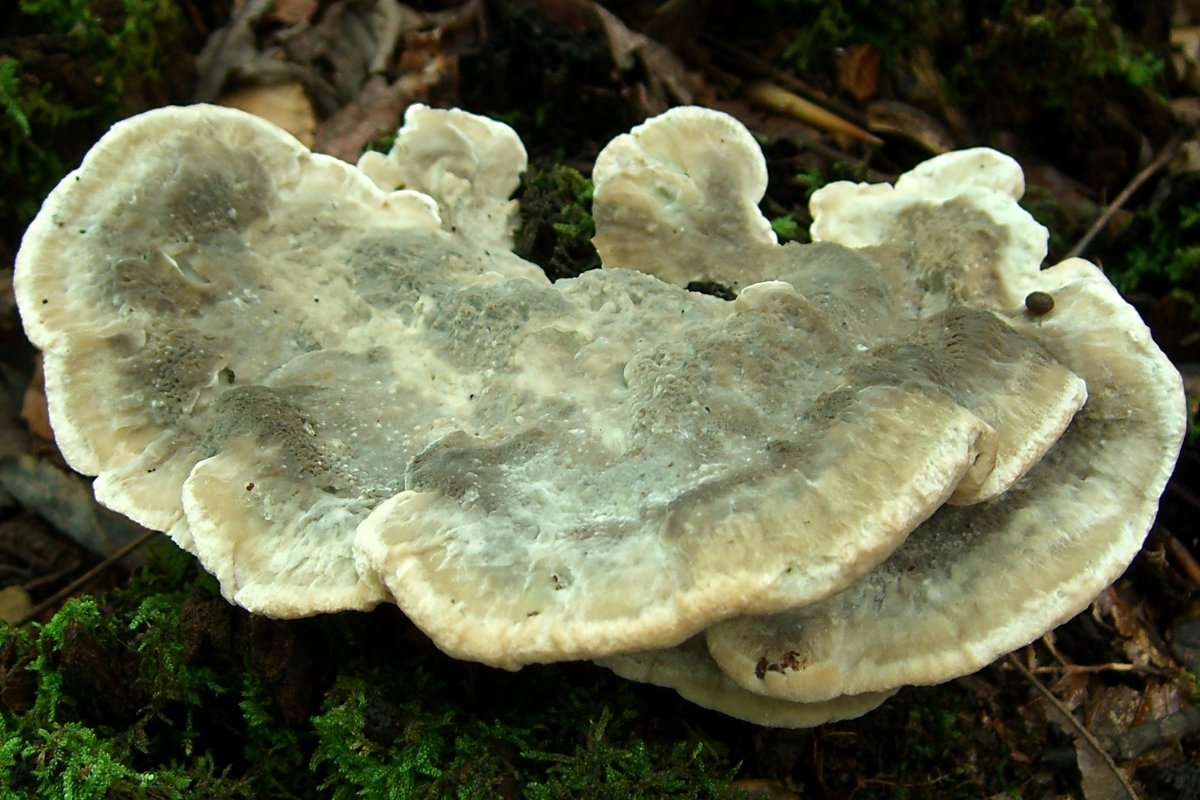
T. galactinus

- Tyromyces gilvellus (Pilát) Komarova (1964)
- Tyromyces globosporus Ipulet & Ryvarden (2005) – Africa
- Tyromyces gollanii (Massee) S.Ahmad (1972)
- Tyromyces hispidulinanus Corner (1989)
- Tyromyces humeana (Murrill) J.Lowe (1975)
- Tyromyces hyalinus (Berk.) Ryvarden (1980)
- Tyromyces hypocitrinus (Berk.) Ryvarden (1984)
- Tyromyces illudens (Overh. & J.Lowe) J.Lowe (1975) – New South Wales
- Tyromyces imbricatus J.D.Zhao & X.Q.Zhang (1983)
- Tyromyces incarnatus Imazeki (1954)
- Tyromyces inodermatus Corner (1989)
- Tyromyces interponens Corner (1989)
- Tyromyces irpiceus Corner (1989)
- Tyromyces kmetii (Bres.) Bondartsev & Singer (1941)

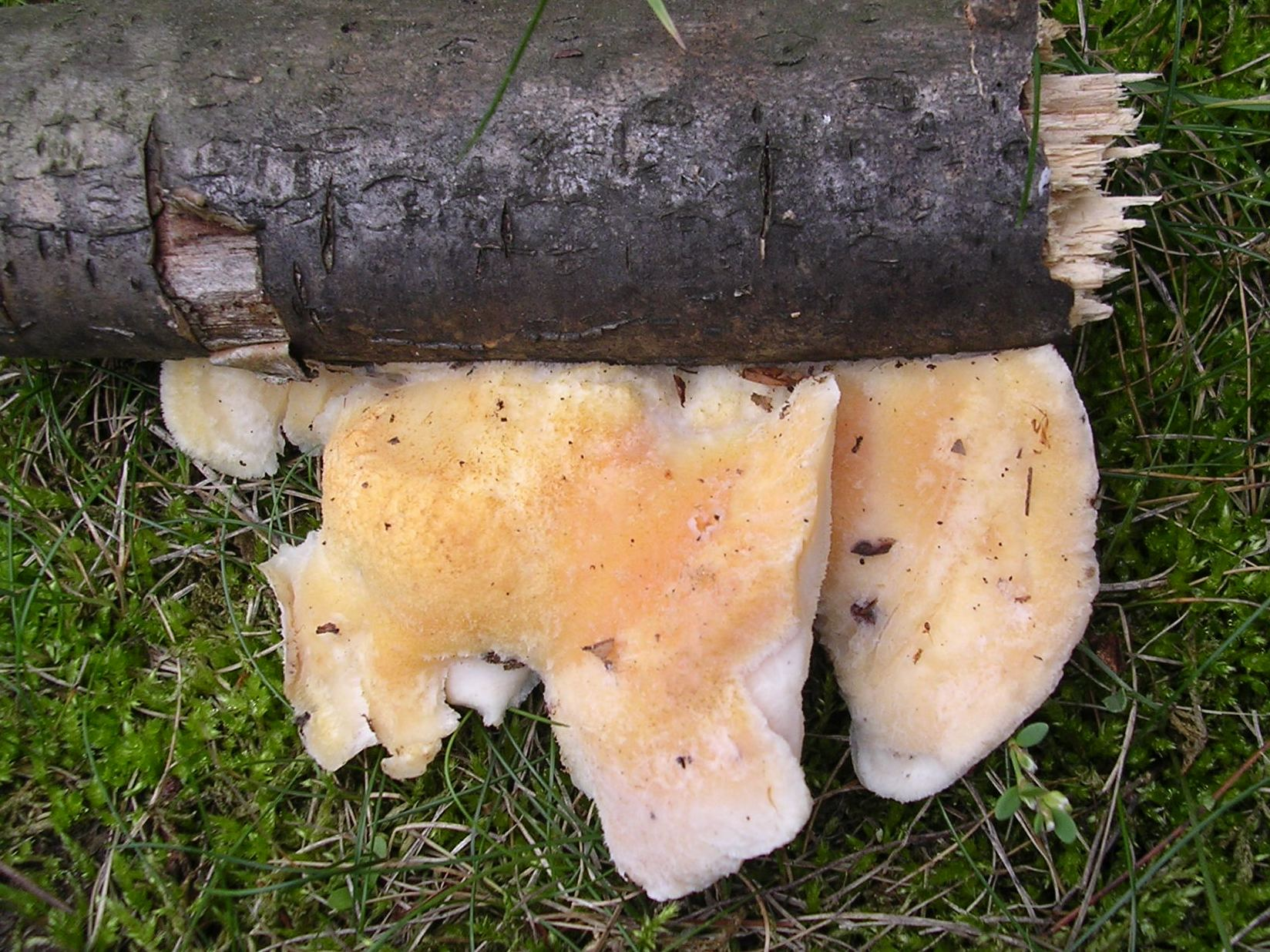
T. kmetii

- Tyromyces lacteus (Fr.) Murrill (1907) – Great Britain
- Tyromyces languidus Corner (1989)
- Tyromyces leucomallus (Berk. & M.A.Curtis) Murrill (1907)
- Tyromyces leucospongia (Cooke & Harkn.) Bondartsev & Singer (1941) – United States

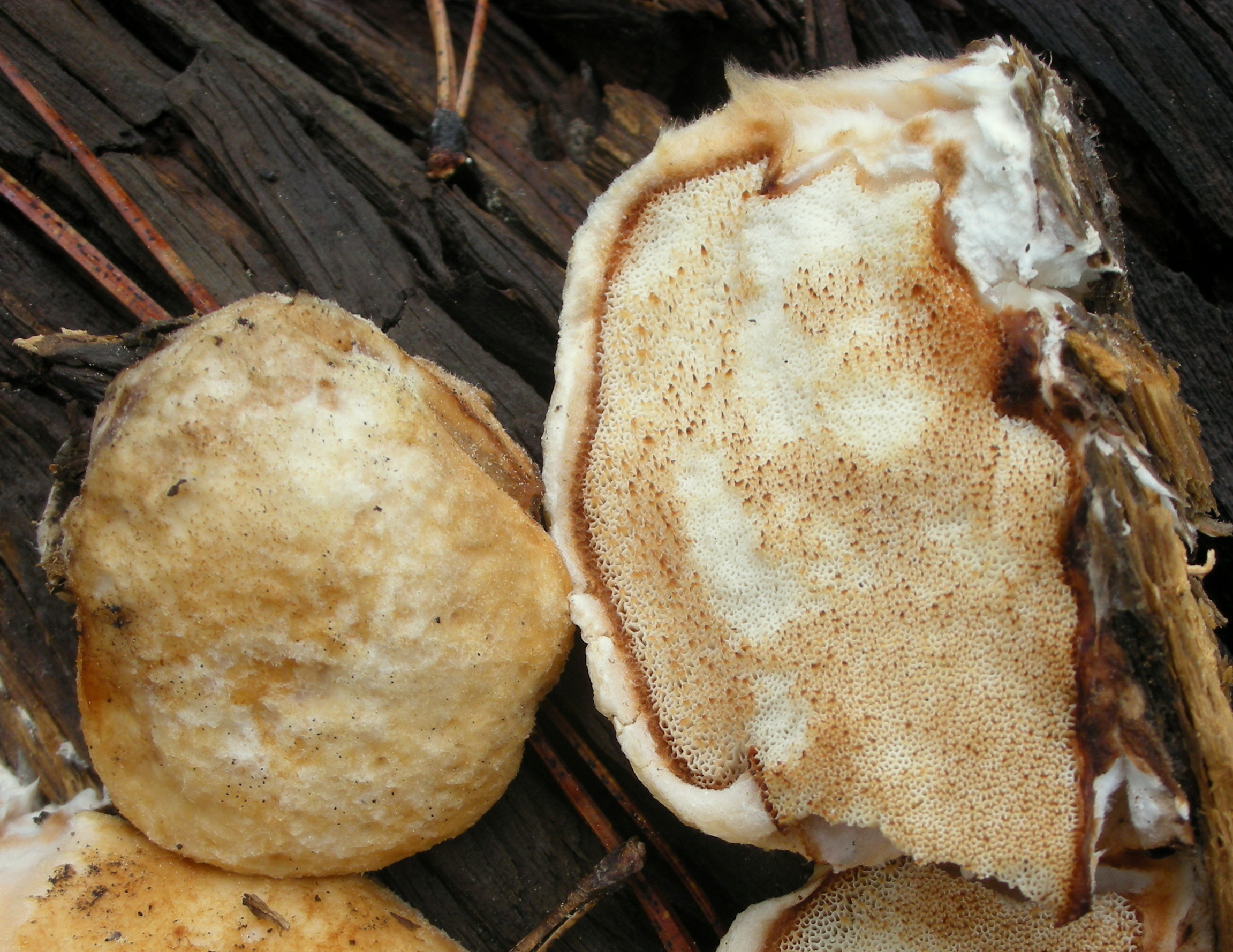
T. leucospongia

- Tyromyces levis Corner (1989)
- Tyromyces limitatus Ryvarden (2000)
- Tyromyces lineatus (Overh.) J.Lowe (1975)
- Tyromyces magnisporus Murrill (1940)
- Tyromyces marianii (Bres.) Ryvarden (1988)
- Tyromyces mediocris Corner (1989)
- Tyromyces merrittii Murrill (1908)
- Tyromyces mexicanus Ryvarden & Guzmán (2001) – Mexico
- Tyromyces mollicaseus Corner (1989)
- Tyromyces navarroi M.Mata & Ryvarden (2010) – Costa Rica
- Tyromyces nemorosus Corner (1989)
- Tyromyces neostrigosus Ryvarden & Iturr. (2003)
- Tyromyces nodulosus Ryvarden (2000)
- Tyromyces ochraceicarneus Corner (1992)
- Tyromyces ochraceivinosus Corner (1989)
- Tyromyces odorus (Sacc.) Zmitr. (2018) (formerly in Antrodia)
- Tyromyces olivascens (Corner) T.Hatt. (2003)
- Tyromyces oxyporoides Ryvarden & Iturr. (2011)
- Tyromyces pendens Ipulet & Ryvarden (2005)
- Tyromyces perskeletalis Corner (1989)
- Tyromyces pinguis Corner (1992)
- Tyromyces polyetes Parmasto (1959)
- Tyromyces polyporoides Ryvarden & Iturr. (2003)
- Tyromyces praeguttulatus (Murrill) Ryvarden (1985)
- Tyromyces pseudoalbidus Bondartseva (1970)
- Tyromyces pseudohoehnelii Bondartsev & Komarova (1959)
- Tyromyces pulcherrimus (Rodway) G.Cunn. (1965) – Australia

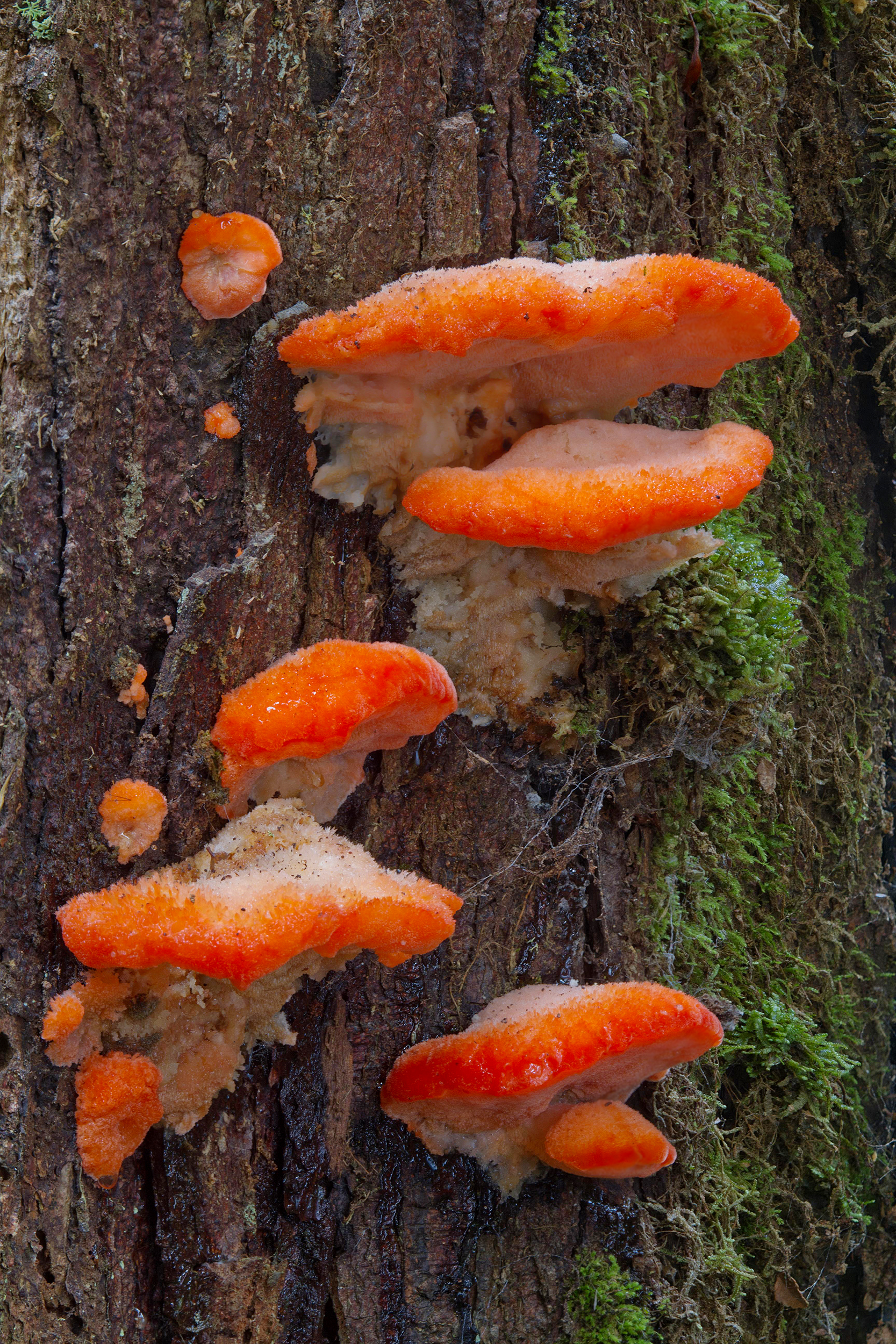
T. pulcherrimus

- Tyromyces pulviniformis Corner (1989)
- Tyromyces pusillicaesius Corner (1989)
- Tyromyces pusillus (Fr.) G.Cunn. (1965)
- Tyromyces raduloides (Henn.) Ryvarden (1980)
- Tyromyces reticulatomarginatus (Pilát) Bondartsev & Singer (1941)
- Tyromyces rhodomelon Corner (1989)
- Tyromyces rubrifuscescens Corner (1989)
- Tyromyces rufipendens Corner (1989)
- Tyromyces rufipileatus Corner (1989)
- Tyromyces sambuceus (Lloyd) Imazeki (1943)
- Tyromyces satakei (Imazeki) Quanten (1997)
- Tyromyces semilimitatus Ryvarden & Iturr. (2011)
- Tyromyces setiger (Cooke) Teng (1963)
- Tyromyces sinapicolor Corner (1992)
- Tyromyces singeri Ryvarden (1987)
- Tyromyces squamosellus Núñez & Ryvarden (1999)
- Tyromyces squamulosus (Bres.) Ryvarden (1988) – Japan
- Tyromyces stenomitis Corner (1989)
- Tyromyces subacutus (Murrill) Ryvarden (1985)
- Tyromyces sublacteus M.P.Christ. (1960) – Europe
- Tyromyces subradiatus Corner (1989)
- Tyromyces subroseiporus Corner (1989)
- Tyromyces subrubescens Corner (1989)
- Tyromyces subviridis Ryvarden & Guzmán (2001) – Mexico
- Tyromyces sulfureiceps Corner (1989)
- Tyromyces tephronotus (Berk.) G.Cunn. (1965) – Tasmania
- Tyromyces tephrus (Pat.) Ryvarden (1983)
- Tyromyces tibeticus J.D.Zhao & X.Q.Zhang (1983)
- Tyromyces toatoa G.Cunn. (1965) – New Zealand
- Tyromyces tristaniae Corner (1989)
- Tyromyces viride Ryvarden & Guzmán (2001) – Mexico
- Tyromyces vitellinus Ryvarden & Hauskn. (2006)
- Tyromyces vivii Homble ex Ryvarden (2003)
- Tyromyces xuchilensis (Murrill) Ryvarden (1985) – Bolivia, China
- Tyromyces zameriensis (Pilát) Bondartsev (1953)
