= Oxyporus similis =

Scientific classification
- Domain: Eukaryota
- Kingdom: Fungi
- Division: Basidiomycota
- Class: Agaricomycetes
- Order: Hymenochaetales
- Family: Schizoporaceae
- Genus: Oxyporus
- Species: O. similis

Binomial name
- Oxyporus similis (Bres.) Ryvarden (1972)

Synonyms
- Poria similis Bres. (1925); Chaetoporus similis (Bres.) J.E.Wright (1964)

Species of fungus

Oxyporus similis is a species of fungus in the Schizoporaceae family. A plant pathogen, it is found in the Pacific Northwest region of the United States, where it grows on the trunks of black cottonwood (Populus trichocarpa). It also affects peach and nectarines.

== See also ==
- List of peach and nectarine diseases
