= Tyromyces subviridis =

Scientific classification
- Domain: Eukaryota
- Kingdom: Fungi
- Division: Basidiomycota
- Class: Agaricomycetes
- Order: Polyporales
- Family: Incrustoporiaceae
- Genus: Tyromyces
- Species: T. subviridis

Binomial name
- Tyromyces subviridis Ryvarden & Guzmán (2001)

Species of fungus

Tyromyces subviridis is a species of fungus in the family Polyporaceae. Found in Mexico, it was described as new to science in 2001 by mycologists Leif Ryvarden and Gastón Guzmán. The type collection was made in Cofre de Perote (Veracruz), where it was found fruiting on a log of unidentified origin. Characteristics of the fungus include its smooth, narrow, cap, the grey to pale green colour of the pore surface and tooth-like pore mouths, and tubes that contrast with the distinctly paler context.
