= Oxyporus piceicola =

Scientific classification
- Domain: Eukaryota
- Kingdom: Fungi
- Division: Basidiomycota
- Class: Agaricomycetes
- Order: Hymenochaetales
- Family: Schizoporaceae
- Genus: Oxyporus
- Species: O. piceicola

Binomial name
- Oxyporus piceicola B.K.Cui & Y.C.Dai (2009)

Species of fungus

Oxyporus piceicola is a species of white rot fungus in the family Schizoporaceae. Found in China, the crust fungus was described as new to science in 2009. The specific epithet piceicola refers to the tree genus Picea, upon which the type specimen was collected. Oxyporus piceicola is found in China. The type locality was in Huanglong Scenic and Historic Interest Area in Jiuzhaigou County.
