= Tyromyces mexicanus =

Scientific classification
- Domain: Eukaryota
- Kingdom: Fungi
- Division: Basidiomycota
- Class: Agaricomycetes
- Order: Polyporales
- Family: Incrustoporiaceae
- Genus: Tyromyces
- Species: T. mexicanus

Binomial name
- Tyromyces mexicanus Ryvarden & Guzmán (2001)

Species of fungus

Tyromyces mexicanus is a species of fungus in the family Polyporaceae. Found in Mexico, it was described as new to science in 2001 by mycologists Leif Ryvarden and Gastón Guzmán. The type collection was made in Cofre de Perote (Veracruz), where it was found fruiting on a dead coniferous log in a spruce and pine forest. The fungus is characterized by its dark, grooved cap, white pore surface, and a thin context that is coloured white to grey.
