= Rosellinia bunodes =

Scientific classification
- Kingdom: Fungi
- Division: Ascomycota
- Class: Sordariomycetes
- Order: Xylariales
- Family: Xylariaceae
- Genus: Rosellinia
- Species: R. bunodes

Binomial name
- Rosellinia bunodes (Berk. & Broome) Sacc. (1882)

Synonyms
- Hypoxylon bunodes (Berk. & Broome) P.M.D. Martin (1976); Hypoxylon bunodes (Berk. & Broome) P.M.D. Martin (1967); Rosellinia echinata Massee (1901); Rosellinia zingiberis F. Stevens & Atienza (1931); Sphaeria bunodes Berk. & Broome (1875)

Species of fungus

Rosellinia bunodes is a plant pathogen infecting several hosts including avocados, bananas, cacao and tea.

Rosellinia bunodes is the causal agent of black root rot of many herbaceous and woody perennials in both tropical and sub-tropical regions of the world. Closely related species – namely R. pepo and R. nectarix – cause symptomatically similar diseases, but distinguishing between species can be quite difficult without the help of molecular (DNA) analysis, since survival structures are rarely observed in both the field and laboratory. Species in the genus Rosellinia can be microscopically identified by the characteristic pear-shaped (piriform) swelling near the septa of adjacent hyphal cells. Taxonomically, Rosellinia spp. are classified as Sordariomycetes within Ascomycota.

== Signs, symptoms, and hosts ==
Rosellinia bunodes is a facultative soil saprophyte capable of infecting a wide range of hosts, including native forest species and important agricultural crops like tea, citrus, coffee, yam, fig, rubber, cassava, banana, avocado, pepper, potato, cocoa, ginger, daffodils, yerba mate and poplar. New reports of susceptible hosts are also still occasionally reported. Outbreaks of black root rot in agricultural systems and the wild often occur in circular patches. Despite the pathogen's wide host range, disease signs and symptoms typically present in the same manner regardless of host species. Symptoms and disease progression have been likened to those caused by Phytophthora spp. and Armillaria spp.

Importantly, R. bunodes is capable of infecting hosts at any age or developmental stage, from young seedlings to mature trees, and shows rapid root colonization abilities on susceptible hosts. The earliest symptoms are visible just seven days after inoculation in vitro as brown lesions on roots that progressively darken to black. Dark discoloration of vascular bundles is visible shortly thereafter.

Once inside the vascular tissue, R. bunodes compromises xylem flow and transport of nutrients to aerial parts of the host resulting in chlorosis, wilting, dry die-back, leaf drop, and eventually host death. In controlled laboratory experiments, vegetative symptoms like chlorosis and wilting in two-year-old poplar (Populus deltoides) saplings were observed 14 days after inoculation, and field observations describe death of mature trees within 3–4 years. In 6-month-old coffee seedlings, 98% died within 10 days of inoculation with R. bunodes.

Early signs of R. bunodes colonization include white, cottony growth on roots that also progressively darken with age. As mycelia grow, they form dense mats over roots and at the base of tree trunks that thicken into irregular knots and aggregate into rhizomorphs. Over time mycelia darken to form black, branching strands firmly attached to host roots; occasionally black dots are visible before this color change, indicating production of asexual and sexual survival structures. Darkened, mature hyphae can also develop and function as microsclerotia, however germination of microsclerotia has never been achieved in a laboratory setting nor observed in nature.

== Disease cycle ==
Teleomorphic stages of Rosellinia spp. are only occasionally observed in the wild and have never been observed in laboratory cultures. The anamorph (Dematophora spp.) is most commonly found. Because survival structures have not been produced in culture, environmental conditions that promote sexual reproduction in R. bunodes are not known. In the wild, smooth, dark perithecia that contain ascospores have been identified and, when present, can be used in species identification. Additionally, R. bunodes produces ephemeral conidia as secondary inoculum and synemma as asexually produced survival structures, suggesting that black root rot is polycyclic in nature. Rosellinia bunodes' mycelia can also aggregate and extend through the soil as rhizomorphs to cause new infections on nearby susceptible hosts. Mycelia can also infect new hosts through root connections in the soil. The saprophytic nature of R. bunodes allows the fungus to survive easily without a host, and the pathogen can increase inoculum by colonizing dead or felled trees and stumps with large underground root masses.

== Environment ==
Even though R. bunodes has only been found in tropic and sub-tropic environments, it is distributed worldwide with outbreaks occurring mainly in the Americas, Africa, India, Indonesia, the Philippines, and Sri Lanka. Considered an opportunistic root pathogen, R. bunodes typically infects plants that are already stressed from abiotic and/or biotic factors such as nematode or insect attack and poor soil nutrient levels/availability. Acidic and humid soils as well as those containing high levels of organic matter are frequently associated with occurrences of black root rot. Similarly, the disease can become increasingly impactful when land is replanted (with coffee for example) and organic material from the previous crop has not been removed.

== Management ==
Since R. bunodes is opportunistic and attacks already weakened or stressed hosts, preventing black root rot can be achieved by maintaining good soil drainage and appropriate soil fertility as well as appropriate control of nematodes and insect pests. Horticultural practices such as canopy pruning to reduce soil humidity can also be effective in disease prevention. Removal of crop residue, dead or felled trees, and in situ burning of stumps have likewise shown to be helpful in preventing the build-up of inoculum.

Despite best management practices, black root rot can still occur necessitating human intervention. Root pruning and digging various styles of trenches to eliminate root contacts is one way of preventing disease spread. This approach is labor-intensive and may only be feasible for small-scale growers or for very localized outbreaks. Fungicide treatments usually include broad-spectrum approaches such as metam sodium, benzimidazoles, chlorophenyls, imidazole, morpholine, oxathiin, triazoles, and some inorganic compounds. Some research has shown biocontrols using mycorrhizal or mycoparasitic fungi (i.e.: Trichoderma spp., Clonostachys spp., Glomus manihotis, and Entrophospora colombiana) to be effective in suppressing the disease, but it is not clear if these interventions are successful only in certain environments or in specific host-pathogen combinations. Biocontrol interventions, however, are most effective when used in conjunction with cultural practices like canopy pruning and liming soil to raise pH. Crop rotation or including non-host species as part of planting schemes can also restrict the spread of the pathogen. Soil solarization has also shown to eliminate up to 75% of inoculum for closely related Rosellinia spp., but has not been evaluated with R. bunodes.
