= Tyromyces toatoa =

Scientific classification
- Domain: Eukaryota
- Kingdom: Fungi
- Division: Basidiomycota
- Class: Agaricomycetes
- Order: Polyporales
- Family: Incrustoporiaceae
- Genus: Tyromyces
- Species: T. toatoa

Binomial name
- Tyromyces toatoa G.Cunn. (1965)

Species of fungus

Tyromyces toatoa is a species of poroid fungus found in New Zealand. It was described as a new species by G. H. Cunningham in 1965. The type collections were made by Joan Dingley, who found the fungus in Taupō, Mount Ruapehu, near Whakapapa Stream. She found it fruiting on the bark of dead branches and trunks of Phyllocladus alpinus, at an elevation of 1,000 metres (3,300 ft). The specific epithet toatoa evokes the Māori name of the host plant.

== Description ==
The fungus is characterized by its dark surface and thin cuticle of the small, effused-reflexed caps. The spores of T. toatoa are more or less sausage-shaped (suballantoid), measuring 4–5 by 1.5–2 μm.
