= Cercospora rubrotincta =

Scientific classification
- Domain: Eukaryota
- Kingdom: Fungi
- Division: Ascomycota
- Class: Dothideomycetes
- Order: Capnodiales
- Family: Mycosphaerellaceae
- Genus: Cercospora
- Species: C. rubrotincta

Binomial name
- Cercospora rubrotincta Ellis & Everh., (1887)

Synonyms
- Passalora rubrotincta (Ellis & Everh.) U. Braun, (1995)

Species of fungus

Cercospora rubrotincta is a fungal plant pathogen. It can cause leaf spot in stone fruits.

== See also ==
- List of peach and nectarine diseases
