= Jack Warcup =

John Henry Warcup (29 October 1921 – 15 May 1998) was a New Zealand-born mycologist. He moved to the United Kingdom to undertake his PhD, examining distribution of fungi through soil profiles at Lakenheath Warren, in the University of Cambridge's botany department. He worked as a member of the Botany Department in the British Forestry Commission until 1951, when he accepted a position as a senior microbiologist in the Department of Plant Pathology at the then Waite Agricultural Research Institute, University of Adelaide where he worked until his retirement in 1986. In 1996 he was honoured by the British Mycological Society, becoming a Centenary Fellow. Warcup published over 70 papers in international peer-reviewed journals and was best known for his work with orchid mycorrhizal fungi, along with Aspergillus and Penicillium species. He was the patron of the Australasian Mycological Society. Two monotypic genera of fungi, Warcupia (Pyronemataceae) and Warcupiella (Trichocomaceae), along with two species of orchid mycorrhizal fungi Tulasnella warcupii (Tulasnellaceae), and Serendipita warcupii (Serendipitaceae) are named in his honour.

== Selected works ==
- Warcup JH (1950) The soil-plate method for isolation of fungi from soil. Nature. 166: 117–118. Citations as of 17/04/2013: 363.
- Warcup JH (1951) The ecology of soil fungi. Trans. Brit. Mycol. Soc. 34: 376–399. Citations as of 17/04/2013: 133.
- Warcup JH (1957) Studies on the occurrence and activity of fungi in a wheat-field soil. Trans. Brit. Mycol. Soc. 40: 237–259. Citations as of 17/04/2013: 116.
- Warcup JH & Talbot PHB (1967) Perfect states of Rhizoctonias associated with orchids. New Phytologist. 66: 631. Citations as of 17/04/2013: 113.
- Warcup JH (1981) The Mycorrhizal Relationships of Australian Orchids. New Phytologist. 87: 371–381. Citations as of 17/04/2013: 108.
