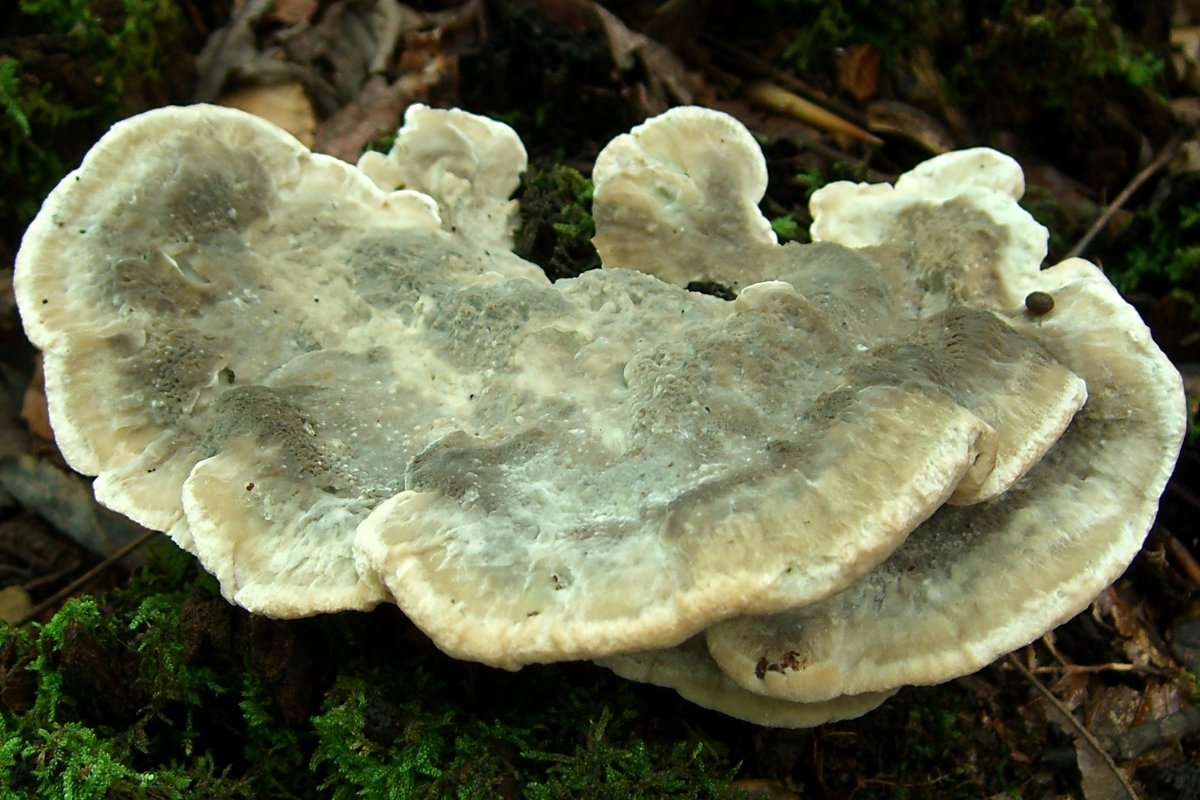

Scientific classification
- Domain: Eukaryota
- Kingdom: Fungi
- Division: Basidiomycota
- Class: Agaricomycetes
- Order: Polyporales
- Family: Incrustoporiaceae
- Genus: Tyromyces
- Species: T. galactinus

Binomial name
- Tyromyces galactinus (Berk.) J.Lowe (1975)

Synonyms
- Polyporus galactinus Berk. (1847); Leptoporus galactinus (Berk.) Pat. (1900); Spongipellis galactinus (Berk.) Pat. (1900); Polyporus iowensis Lloyd (1925); Tyromyces galactinus (Berk.) Bondartsev (1953); Leptoporellus galactinus (Berk.) Spirin (2001)

= Tyromyces galactinus =

Species of fungus

Tyromyces galactinus is a species of poroid fungus in the family Polyporaceae. Found in North America, is a plant pathogen that causes a white rot in broad-leaved trees. The fungus was first described by Miles Joseph Berkeley in 1847. The type was collected near Waynesville, Ohio, where it was found growing on rotting trunks. Although originally placed in genus Tyromyces by Russian mycologist Appollinaris Semenovich Bondartsev in 1953, the name is invalid as it did not confirm to the rules for naming species. Josiah Lincoln Lowe transferred the fungus to Tyromyces validly in 1975.

== See also ==
- List of Platanus diseases
- List of peach and nectarine diseases
