= Dendrophora erumpens =

Scientific classification
- Kingdom: Fungi
- Division: Basidiomycota
- Class: Agaricomycetes
- Order: Russulales
- Family: Peniophoraceae
- Genus: Dendrophora
- Species: D. erumpens

Binomial name
- Dendrophora erumpens (Burt) Chamuris, Mycotaxon 28(2): 544 (1987)

Synonyms
- Peniophora erumpens (Burt) Boidin, (1961); Stereum erumpens Burt, (1920); Stereum versiforme f. erumpens (Burt) Killerm., (1943)

Species of fungus

Dendrophora erumpens is a plant pathogen.
