= Asteridiella perseae =

Scientific classification
- Kingdom: Fungi
- Division: Ascomycota
- Class: Sordariomycetes
- Order: Meliolales
- Family: Meliolaceae
- Genus: Asteridiella
- Species: A. perseae

Binomial name
- Asteridiella perseae (F. Stevens) Hansf., (1957)

Synonyms
- Irene perseae (F. Stevens) Toro, (1925)

Species of fungus

Asteridiella perseae is a plant pathogen that causes black mildew on avocado.
