= Fomitopsis supina =

Scientific classification
- Kingdom: Fungi
- Division: Basidiomycota
- Class: Agaricomycetes
- Order: Polyporales
- Family: Fomitopsidaceae
- Genus: Fomitopsis
- Species: F. supina

Binomial name
- Fomitopsis supina (Sw.) Murrill, 1978

Synonyms
- List: Boletus supinus Sw. (1806) Fomes hemileucus (Berk. & M.A.Curtis) Sacc. (1885) Fomes rubritinctus Murrill (1903) Fomes scleromyces (Berk. & M.A.Curtis) Cooke (1885) Fomes subolivaceus (Berk. & M.A.Curtis) Cooke (1885) Fomes supinus (Sw.) Cooke (1885) Fomes valenzuelianus (Mont.) Sacc. (1888) Fomitella supina (Sw.) Murrill (1905) Microporus rudis (Lév.) Kuntze (1898) Phellinus subolivaceus (Berk. & M.A.Curtis) Pat. (1900) Phellinus valenzuelianus (Mont.) Pat. (1900) Polyporus hemileucus Berk. & M.A.Curtis (1868) Polyporus rudis Lév. (1846) Polyporus scleromyces Berk. & M.A.Curtis (1868) Polyporus subolivaceus Berk. & M.A.Curtis (1868) Polyporus supinus (Sw.) Fr. (1821) Polyporus supinus var. ater Rick (1940) Polyporus valenzuelianus Mont. (1842) Polystictus rudis (Lév.) Cooke (1886) Scindalma hemileucum (Berk. & M.A.Curtis) Kuntze (1898) Scindalma scleromyces (Berk. & M.A.Curtis) Kuntze (1898) Scindalma subolivaceum (Berk. & M.A.Curtis) Kuntze (1898) Scindalma supinum (Sw.) Kuntze (1898) Scindalma valenzuelianum (Mont.) Kuntze (1898) Ungulina hemileuca (Berk. & M.A.Curtis) Pat. (1900)

Species of fungus

Fomitopsis supina is a species of fungus in the family Fomitopsidaceae. It is a plant pathogen that affects avocados.

== See also ==
- List of avocado diseases
