= Botryosphaeria quercuum =

Scientific classification
- Kingdom: Fungi
- Division: Ascomycota
- Class: Dothideomycetes
- Order: Botryosphaeriales
- Family: Botryosphaeriaceae
- Genus: Botryosphaeria
- Species: B. quercuum

Binomial name
- Botryosphaeria quercuum (Schwein.) Sacc. (1882)

Synonyms
- Botryosphaeria advena Ces. & De Not. (1863); Botryosphaeria dasylirii (Peck) Theiss. & Syd. (1915); Botryosphaeria hoffmannii Höhn. (1904); Botryosphaeria melanops (Tul.) G.Winter (1887); Dothidea dasylirii Peck (1882); Dothidea melanops Tul. Melanops quercuum (Schwein.) Rehm, (1919); Melogramma quercuum (Schwein.) Berk. (1876); Phyllachora dasylirii (Peck) Sacc. (1883); Physalospora lagunculariae Rehm (1901); Puiggarina lagunculariae (Rehm) Speg. (1919); Sphaeria quercuum Schwein. (1822)

Species of fungus

Botryosphaeria quercuum is a fungal plant pathogen that causes cankers in avocado, dieback on mango and leaf spot in natal plum (carissa grandiflora).
