= Meruliopsis ambigua =

Scientific classification
- Kingdom: Fungi
- Division: Basidiomycota
- Class: Agaricomycetes
- Order: Polyporales
- Family: Irpicaceae
- Genus: Meruliopsis
- Species: M. ambigua

Binomial name
- Meruliopsis ambigua (Berk.) Ginns, (1976)

Species of fungus

Meruliopsis ambigua is a plant pathogen.
