= Phyllachora gratissima =

Scientific classification
- Kingdom: Fungi
- Division: Ascomycota
- Class: Sordariomycetes
- Order: Phyllachorales
- Family: Phyllachoraceae
- Genus: Phyllachora
- Species: P. gratissima

Binomial name
- Phyllachora gratissima Rehm, (1892)

Species of fungus

Phyllachora gratissima is a plant pathogen infecting avocados.
