= Peach enation virus =

Virus classification
- Group: Group IV ((+)ssRNA)
- Class: Pisoniviricetes
- Order: Picornavirales
- Family: Secoviridae
- Genus: Nepovirus
- Species: Peach enation virus

Species of virus

Peach enation virus is a plant pathogenic virus of the family Comoviridae.
