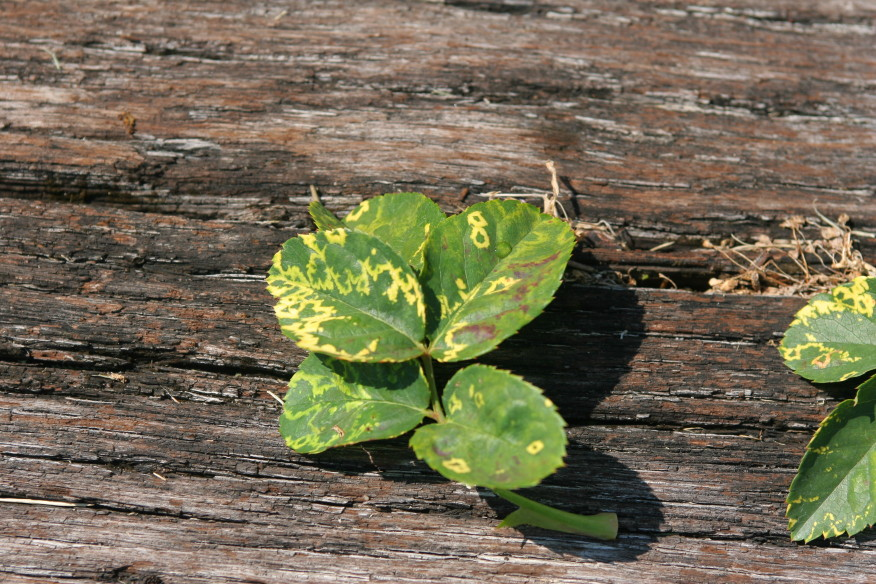
- Mosaic virus can appear as subtle blotches on the leaves of the plant, or more extreme discolouration.

Virus classification
- (unranked): Virus
- Realm: Riboviria
- Kingdom: Orthornavirae
- Phylum: Kitrinoviricota
- Class: Alsuviricetes
- Order: Martellivirales
- Family: Bromoviridae
- Genus: Ilarvirus
- Species: Ilarvirus PNRSV

Synonyms
- European plum line pattern virus hop B virus hop C virus peach ringspot virus plum line pattern virus Prunus ringspot virus red currant necrotic ringspot virus rose chlorotic mottle virus rose line pattern virus rose vein banding virus rose yellow vein mosaic virus

= Prunus necrotic ringspot virus =

Species of virus

Prunus necrotic ringspot virus (PNRSV) is a plant pathogenic virus causing ring spot diseases affecting species of the genus Prunus, as well as other species such as rose (Rosa spp.) and hops (Humulus lupulus). PNRSV is found worldwide due to easy transmission through plant propagation methods and infected seed. The virus is in the family Bromoviridae and genus Ilarvirus. Synonyms of PNRSV include European plum line pattern virus, hop B virus, hop C virus, plum line pattern virus, sour cherry necrotic ringspot virus, and peach ringspot virus.

== Hosts and symptoms ==
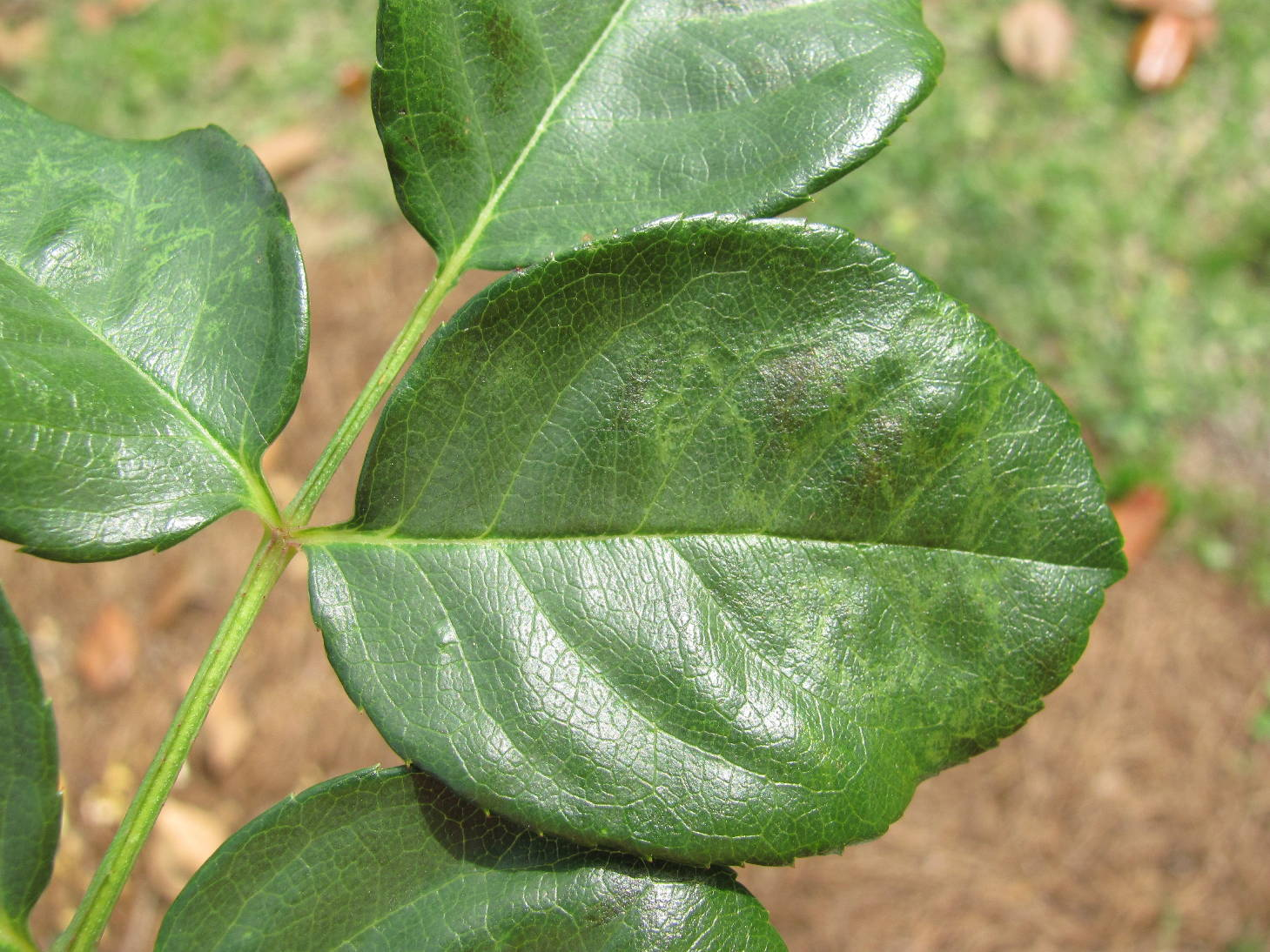
More subtle patterning indicating rose mosaic virus.

All cultivated species of the genus Prunus, which includes plums, cherries, apricots, almonds, and peaches, are susceptible to one or more strains of PNRSV. Hops and rose are also susceptible to infection by the virus. Other susceptible hosts used for diagnosis include Chenopodium quinoa Willd., sunflower (Helianthus annus), and Momordica balsamina.

Symptoms on orchard trees can include death of buds and roots, reduced tree survival and uniformity, and increased susceptibility to winter injury. Some common symptoms also include necrotic "shot holes" in leaves or rugosity and mosaic symptoms. In sweet cherries, PNRSV causes reduced leaf size and produces diffused chlorotic rings and/or spots. Generally, symptoms of PNRSV appear in the year following infection, and then becomes symptomless, although some strains cause recurrent symptoms annually. Although adult trees can show recovery from initial symptoms, keeping young trees virus-free is important because the virus can cause long-lasting stunting compared to healthy trees. Symptom severity varies due to host cultivar and viral isolate.

== Transmission and epidemiology ==
PNRSV can be transmitted through plant propagation methods, making spread through tree nursery stock and root grafting in orchards problematic. The virus also has been shown to infect and transmit through pollen and seeds. PNRSV has been shown to be transmitted by bees carrying infected pollen into orchards. PNRSV infects all seed parts, therefore infection of seed can occur from an infected pollen grain, ovule, or both. Seed transmission incidence can be different among different species or varieties of hosts; host factors that control viral seed transmission, however, are unknown. Cross pollination with PNRSV infected pollen to healthy plants has shown that the virus can also infect the fruit and not just seeds. The virus can also be transmitted by thrips, however the contribution and importance of thrips transmission is unknown.

As of September 2021, there have been 631 PNRSV isolates from 33 countries deposited in NCBI GenBank, showing that the virus is a great international traveler. The long-distance transmission among countries is most likely in plant materials carried by human. Phylogenetic and population genetic analyses indicated that the common ancestor of current PNRSV isolates was originated from America continent.

== Management and control ==
The most important measure in controlling PNRSV is through planting of certified virus-free trees. Tree nurseries producing propagative material can use thermotherapy (keeping cultures at 38˚ C for at least 20 days), and/or apical meristem cultures to eliminate PNRSV. Prompt removal of infected trees is often recommended as a control strategy, but is not practical for most growers. Field studies have shown that planting of same or similar cultivars near an infected orchard favored earlier infection than when different cultivars were grown, indicating that planting of unrelated cultivars could help slow spread of the virus and allow healthy trees to bear fruit before infection. Genetically engineered resistance may be a possibility for control in the future using RNA interference silencing.
