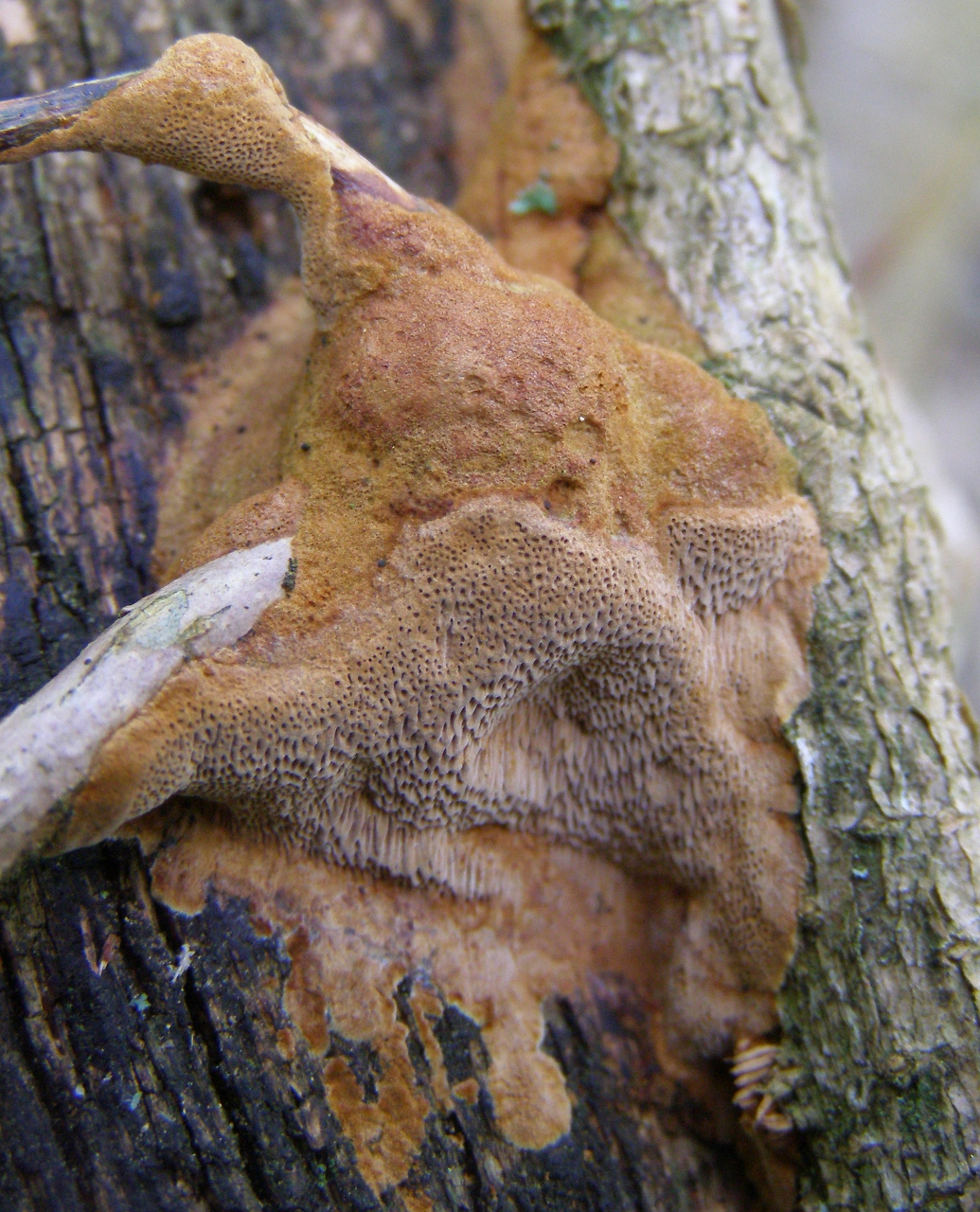

Scientific classification
- Domain: Eukaryota
- Kingdom: Fungi
- Division: Basidiomycota
- Class: Agaricomycetes
- Order: Hymenochaetales
- Family: Hymenochaetaceae
- Genus: Phellinus
- Species: P. ferreus

Binomial name
- Phellinus ferreus (Pers.) Bourdot & Galzin, (1928)

= Phellinus ferreus =

Species of fungus

Phellinus ferreus is a plant pathogen infecting stone fruit trees.
