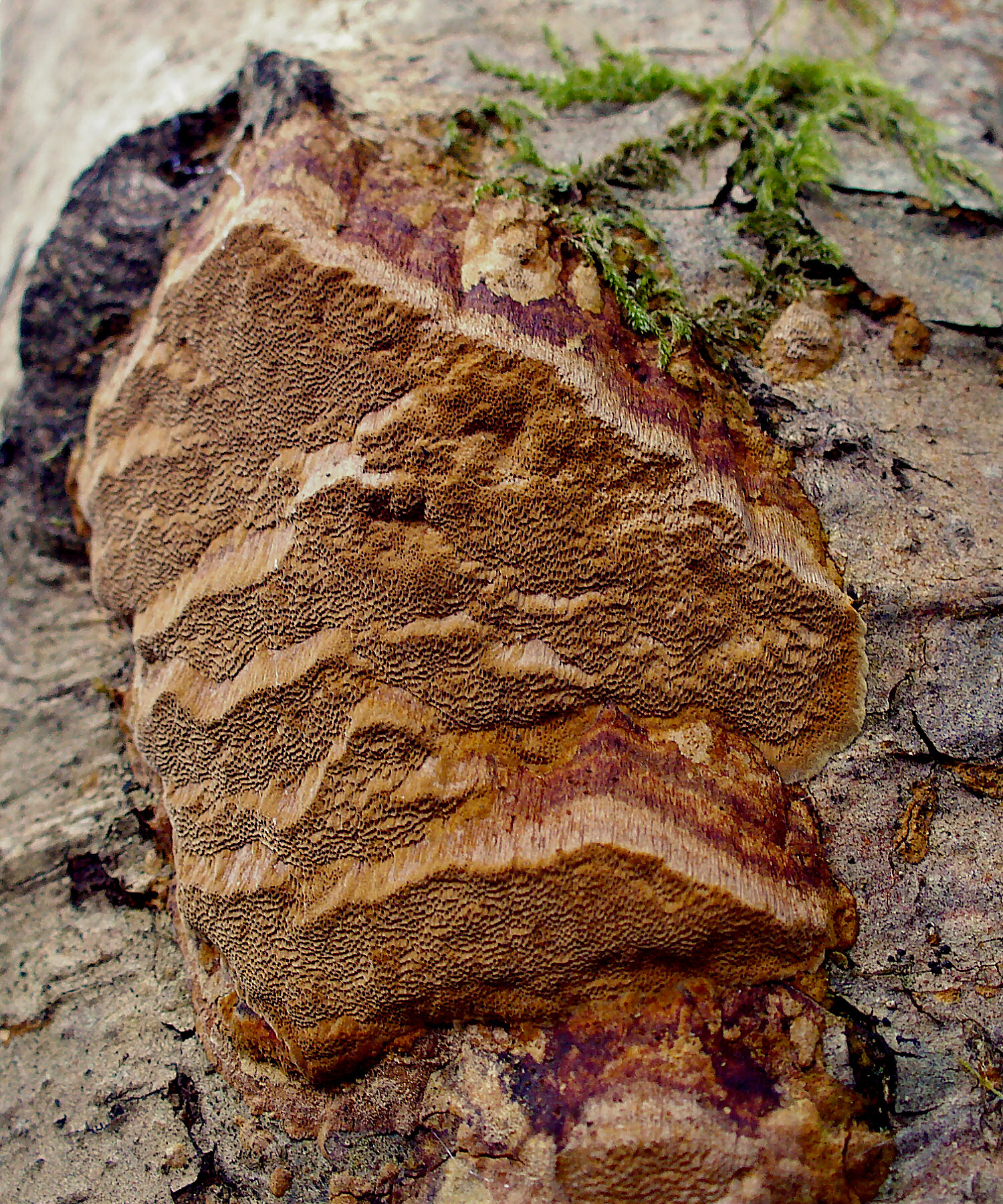
- Phellinus ferruginosus found growing on Alnus rubra in LBA Park, Olympia, Washington, USA

Scientific classification
- Kingdom: Fungi
- Division: Basidiomycota
- Class: Agaricomycetes
- Order: Hymenochaetales
- Family: Hymenochaetaceae
- Genus: Phellinus
- Species: P. ferruginosus

Binomial name
- Phellinus ferruginosus (Schrad.) Pat., (1900)

= Phellinus ferruginosus =

Species of fungus

Phellinus ferruginosus is a plant pathogen. It is inedible.
