= Amédée Galzin =

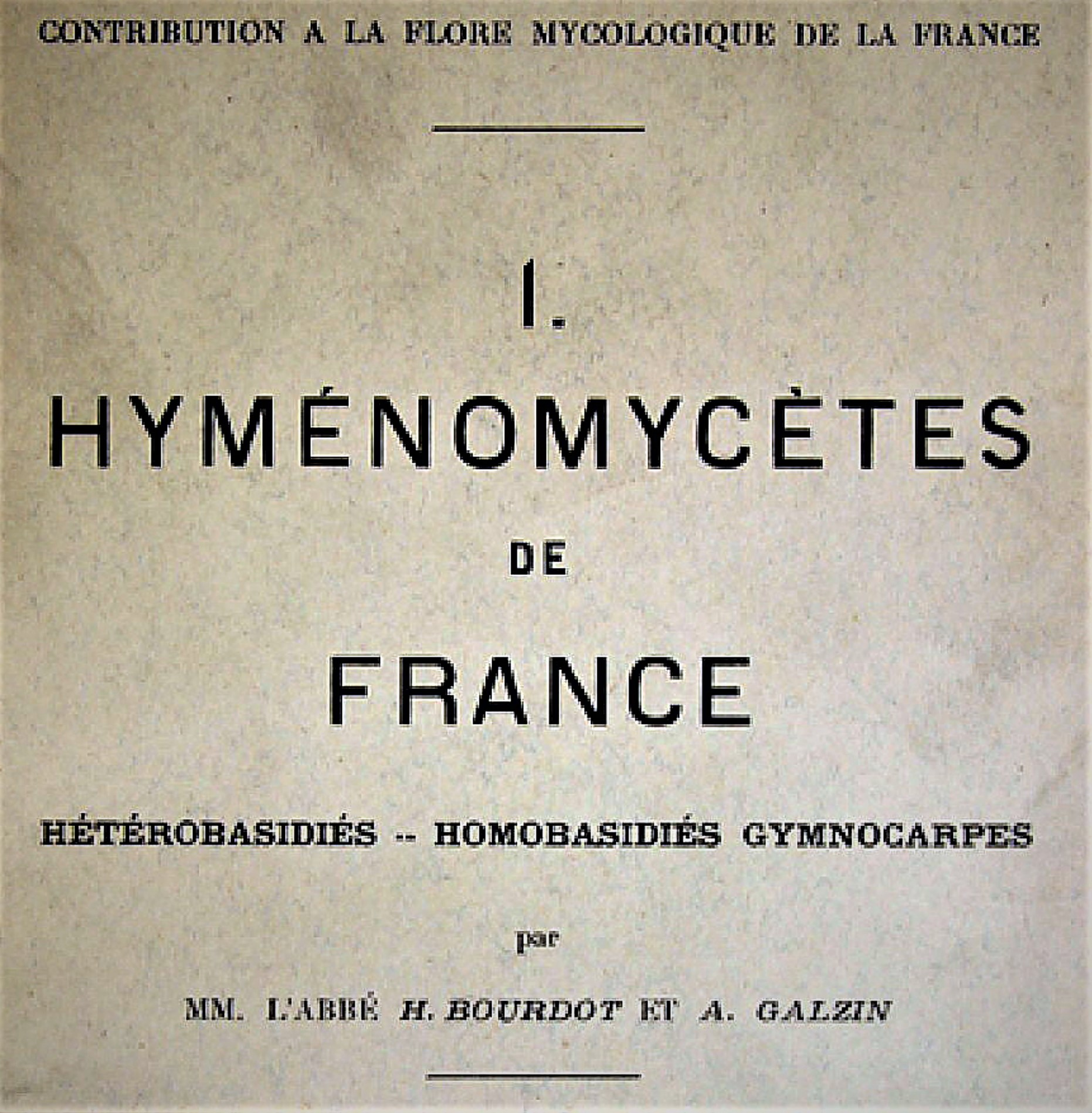

Amédée Galzin (1 May 1853, Parrinet, Aveyron – 14 February 1925, Parrinet) was a French veterinarian and mycologist.

In 1878, he obtained his degree from the veterinary college in Toulouse. From 1879 to 1905, he served as a military veterinarian, becoming a knight of the Legion of Honour in 1899.

With Abbé Hubert Bourdot, he was co-author of a series of publications (11 parts, 1909 to 1925) involving Hymenomycetes native to France; all parts being published in the Bulletin de la Société Mycologique de France. With Bourdot, he also wrote Heterobasidiae nondum descriptae (Descriptions of a few jelly fungi).

With Bourdot, he was the taxonomic authority of the fungi genus Oxyporus, as well as of numerous mycological species.
