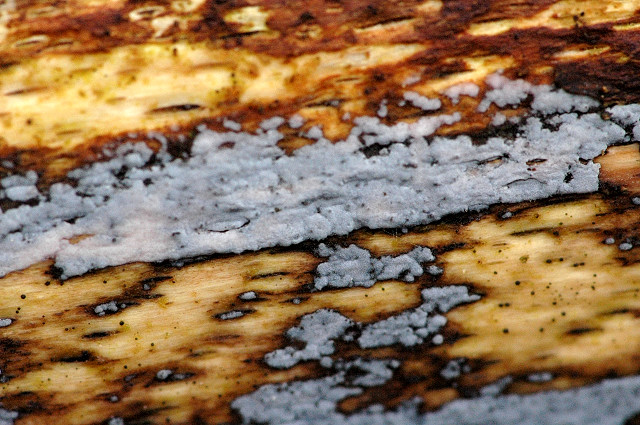
- Tulasnella violea

Scientific classification
- Kingdom: Fungi
- Division: Basidiomycota
- Class: Agaricomycetes
- Order: Cantharellales
- Family: Tulasnellaceae; Juel

Type genus
- Tulasnella J. Schröt.

Genera
- Stilbotulasnella; Tulasnella

= Tulasnellaceae =

Family of fungi

The Tulasnellaceae are a family of fungi in the order Cantharellales. The family comprises mainly effused (patch-forming) fungi formerly referred to the "jelly fungi" or heterobasidiomycetes. Species are wood- or litter-rotting saprotrophs, but many are also endomycorrhizal associates of orchids and some have also been thought to form ectomycorrhizal associations with trees and other plants.

== Taxonomy ==
=== History ===
The family was described in 1897 by the Swedish botanist and mycologist Hans Oscar Juel to accommodate species of fungi producing basidiocarps (fruit bodies) having distinctive basidia with grossly swollen sterigmata. He included two genera: Tulasnella itself and the poroid genus Muciporus (the latter subsequently found to be no more than Tulasnella species growing over the surface of old polypores). In 1900, the French mycologist Narcisse Patouillard included the Tulasnellaceae within the heterobasidiomycetes or "jelly fungi" and in 1922 British mycologist Carleton Rea placed the family in its own order, the Tulasnellales, within the heterobasidiomycetes.

=== Current status ===
Molecular research, based on cladistic analysis of DNA sequences, has confirmed the Tulasnellaceae as distinct, but has placed the family within the Cantharellales, close to the Ceratobasidiaceae. A standard 2008 reference work estimated that the family contains three genera and over 50 species.

== Description ==
All but one of the species within the family form smooth, effused, corticioid basidiocarps that are distinguished microscopically by their distinctive "tulasnelloid" basidia. The monotypic genus Stilbotulasnella forms basidiocarps with similar basidia, but with an erect, "stilboid" anamorph. The latter genus has not been sequenced, but was originally described as belonging within the Tulasnellaceae.

== Habitat and distribution ==
Basidiocarps of the Tulasnellaceae are typically found in woodland, on the underside of fallen wood or in leaf litter. They are believed to be soil fungi and many species have also been isolated from the roots of terrestrial and epiphytic orchids. They may also form ectomycorrhizal associations with trees and other plants. Their distribution is cosmopolitan.
