= Hubert Bourdot =

French Roman Catholic priest and mycologist

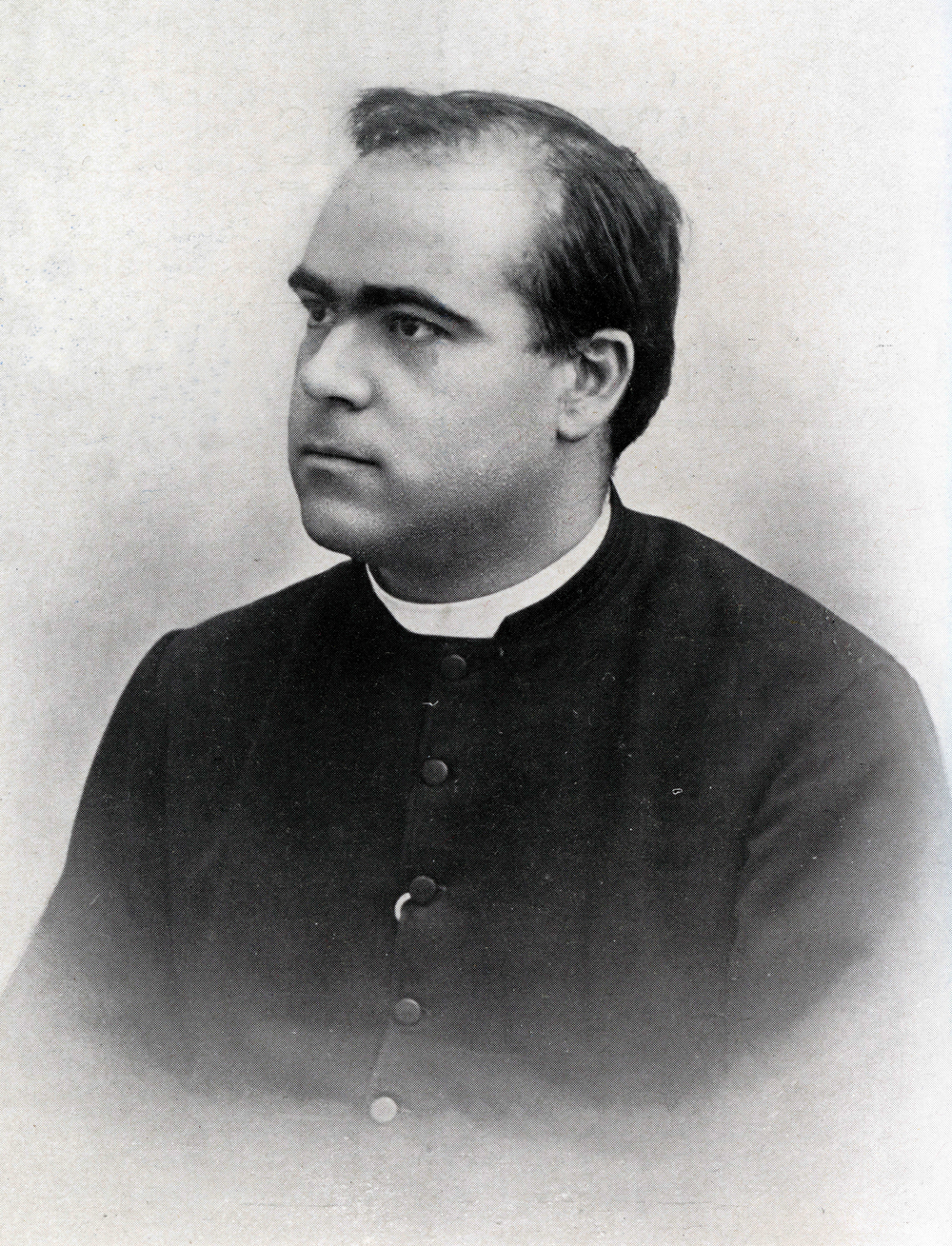
Hubert Bourdot

Hubert Bourdot (30 October 1861 – 30 September 1937) was a French Roman Catholic priest and mycologist who was a native of Imphy, a community in the department of Nièvre.

From 1898 until his death, Bourdot was a parish priest in Saint-Priest-en-Murat. He was a member of the Société mycologique de France, serving as its vice-president in 1919, and later becoming an honorary president (1929). He bequeathed his mycological collection to the Museum National d'Histoire Naturelle in Paris.

With mycologist Amédée Galzin (1853–1925), he was co-author of a series of publications (1909–1925) involving Hymenomycetes native to France (published in the Bulletin de la Société Mycologique de France).

== Selected publications ==
- Hyménomycètes de France: I. Heterobasidiés, 1909
- Hyménomycètes de France: II. Homobasidiés: Clavariés et Cyphellés, 1910
- Hyménomycètes de France: III. Corticiées: Corticium, Epithele, Asterostromella, 1911
- Hyménomycètes de France: IV. Corticiées: Vuilleminia, Aleurodiscus, Dendrothele, Gloeocystidium, Peniophora, 1912
- Hyménomycètes de France: V. Hydnées, 1914
- Hyménomycètes de France: VI. Asterostromés, 1920
- Hyménomycètes de France: VII. Stereum, 1921
- Hyménomycètes de France: VIII. Hymenochaete, 1923
- Hyménomycètes de France: IX. Meruliés, 1923
- Hyménomycètes de France. X. Phylactèriés, 1924
- Hyménomycètes de France, XI., 1925
- Heterobasidiae nondum descriptae, 1924 (descriptions of a few jelly fungi), with Galzin in: Bulletin de la Société Mycologique de France.
- Contribution à la Flore Mycologique de la France: I. Hyménomycètes de France. Hétérobasidiés-Homobasidiés Gymnocarpes, with Galzin (761 pp.), 1927.
