= Government Botanical Garden =

Botanical garden in Tamil Nadu, India

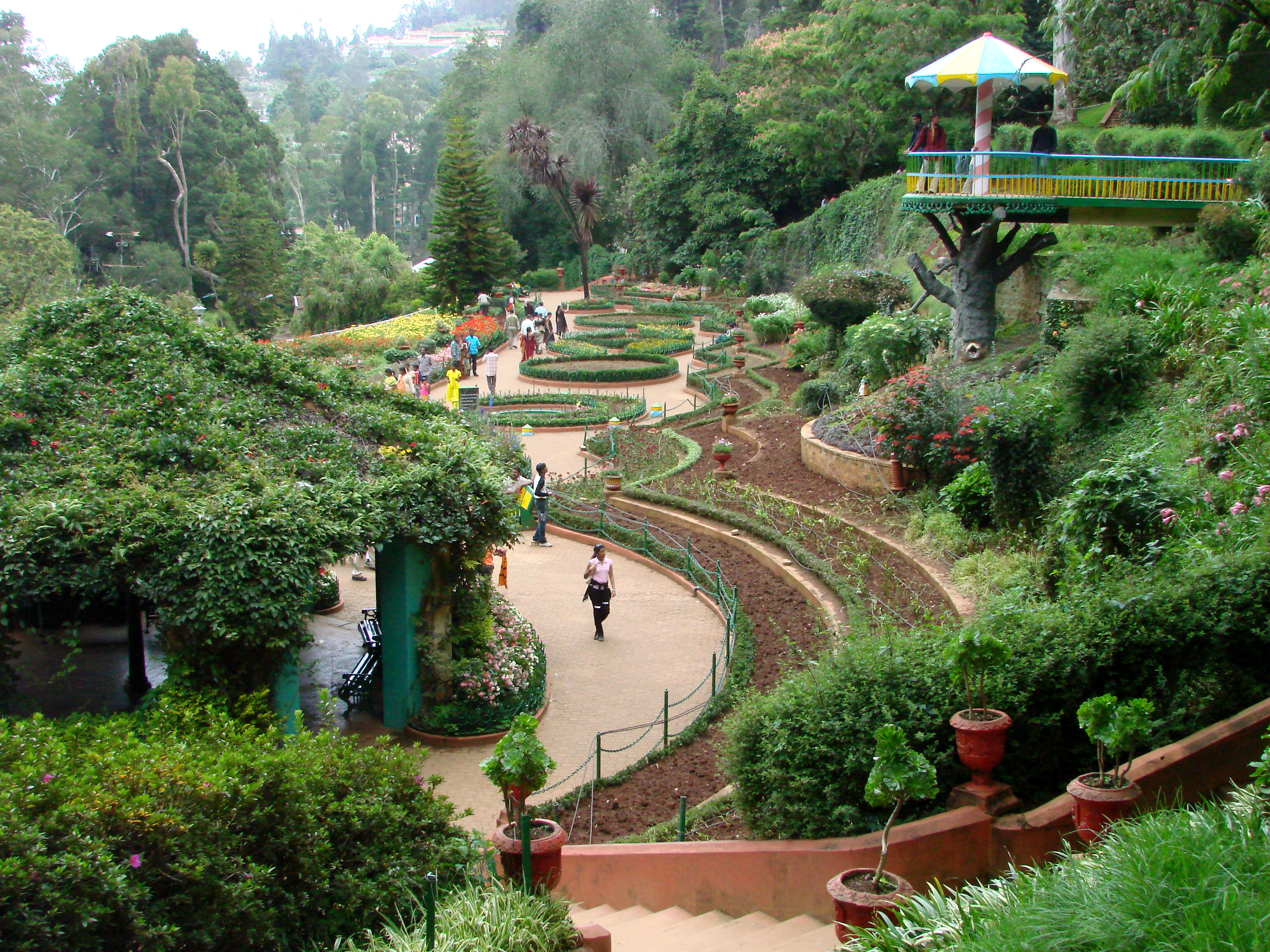
- Government Botanical Garden, Ooty
- Interactive map of Government Botanical Garden
- Type: Botanical Garden
- Location: Ooty (Udhagamandalam)
- Coordinates: 11.418752°N 76.711038°E
- Area: 22 hectares (54 acres)
- Opened: 1847
- Owner: Government of Tamil Nadu
- Operator: Horticulture Department, Government of Tamil Nadu
- Status: Open
- Species: 650
- Collections: Cork tree, Paper bark tree, Monkey puzzle tree

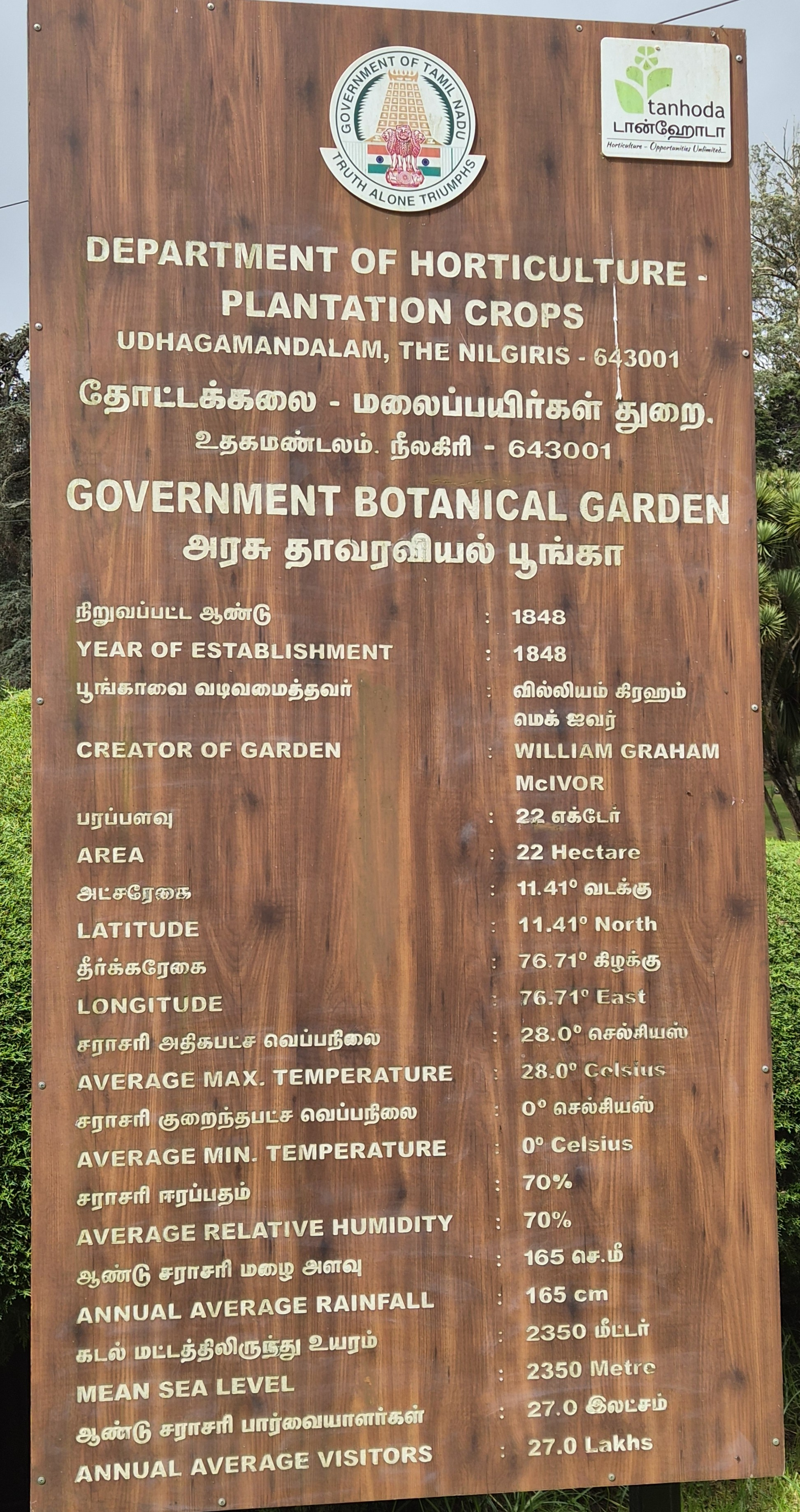
Informational board

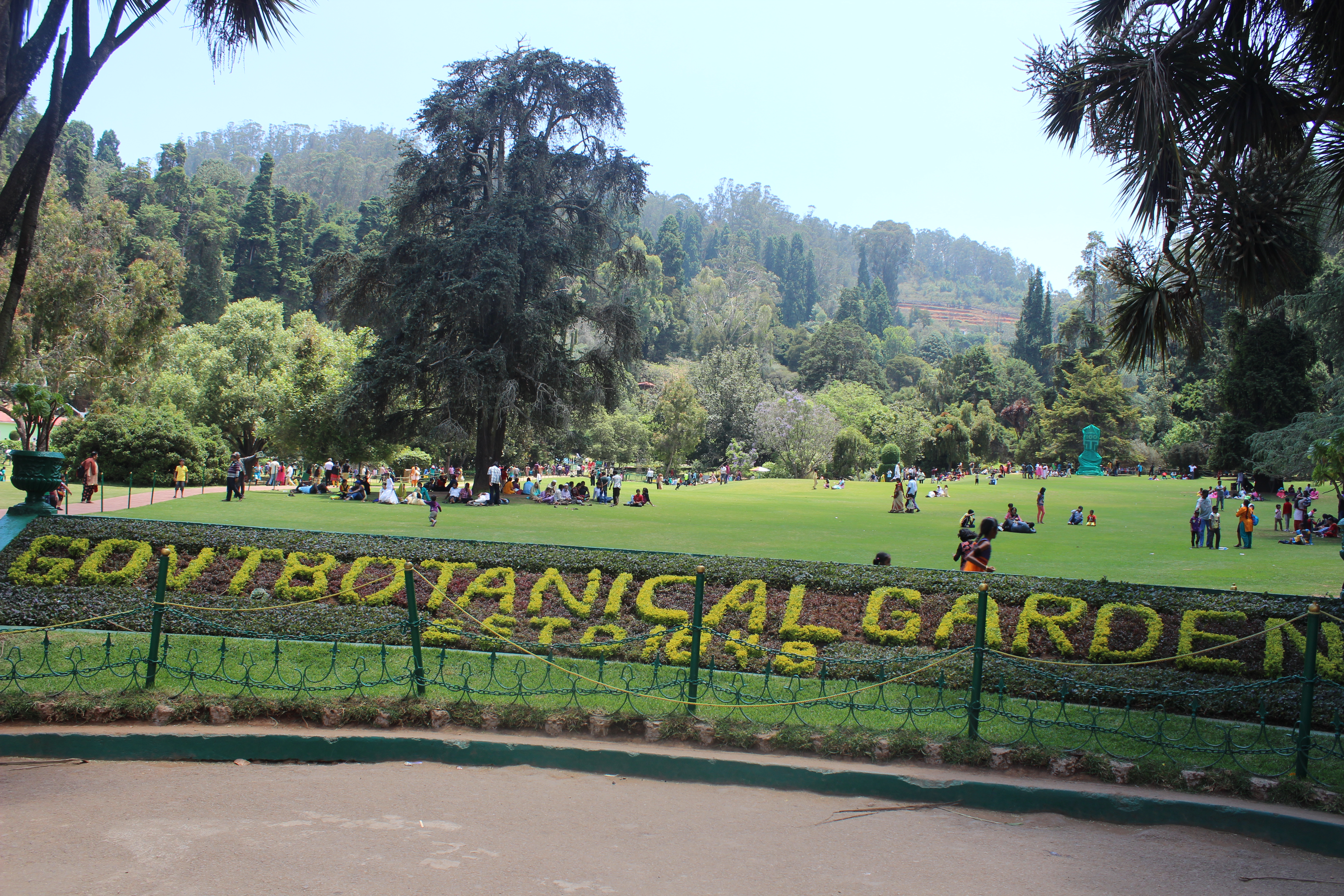
Botanical Garden

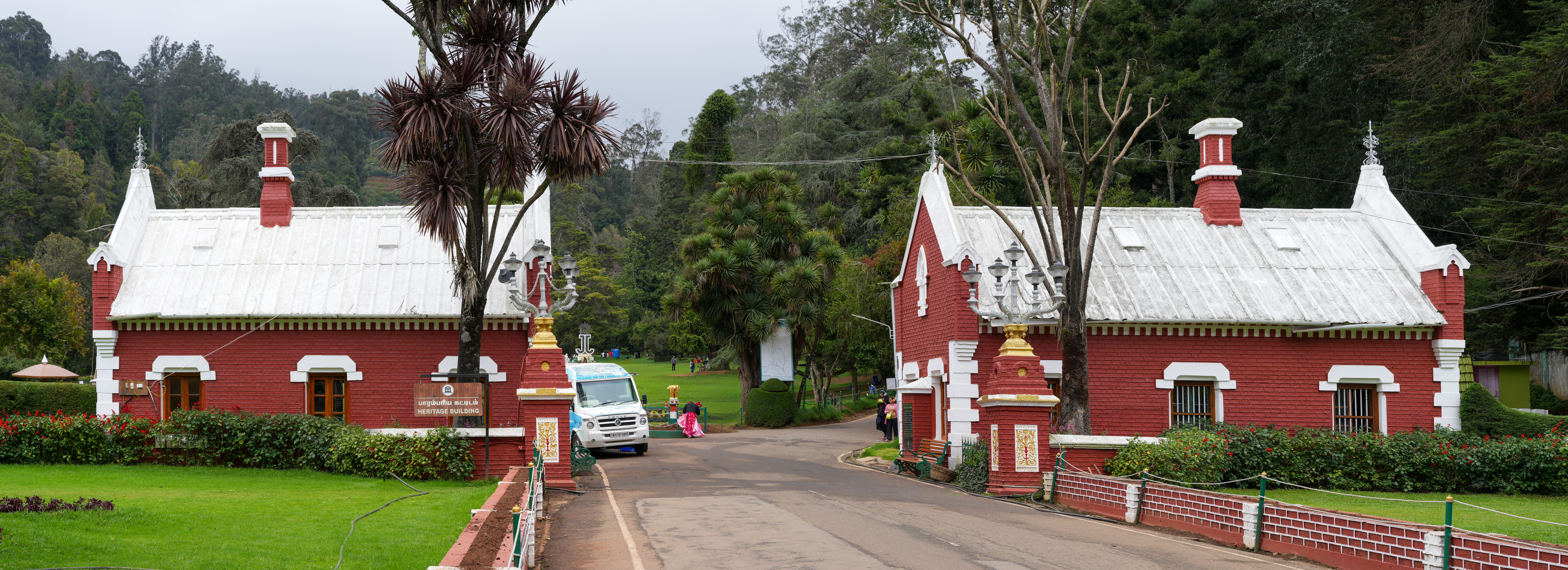
Gate Building near entrance (built 1859)

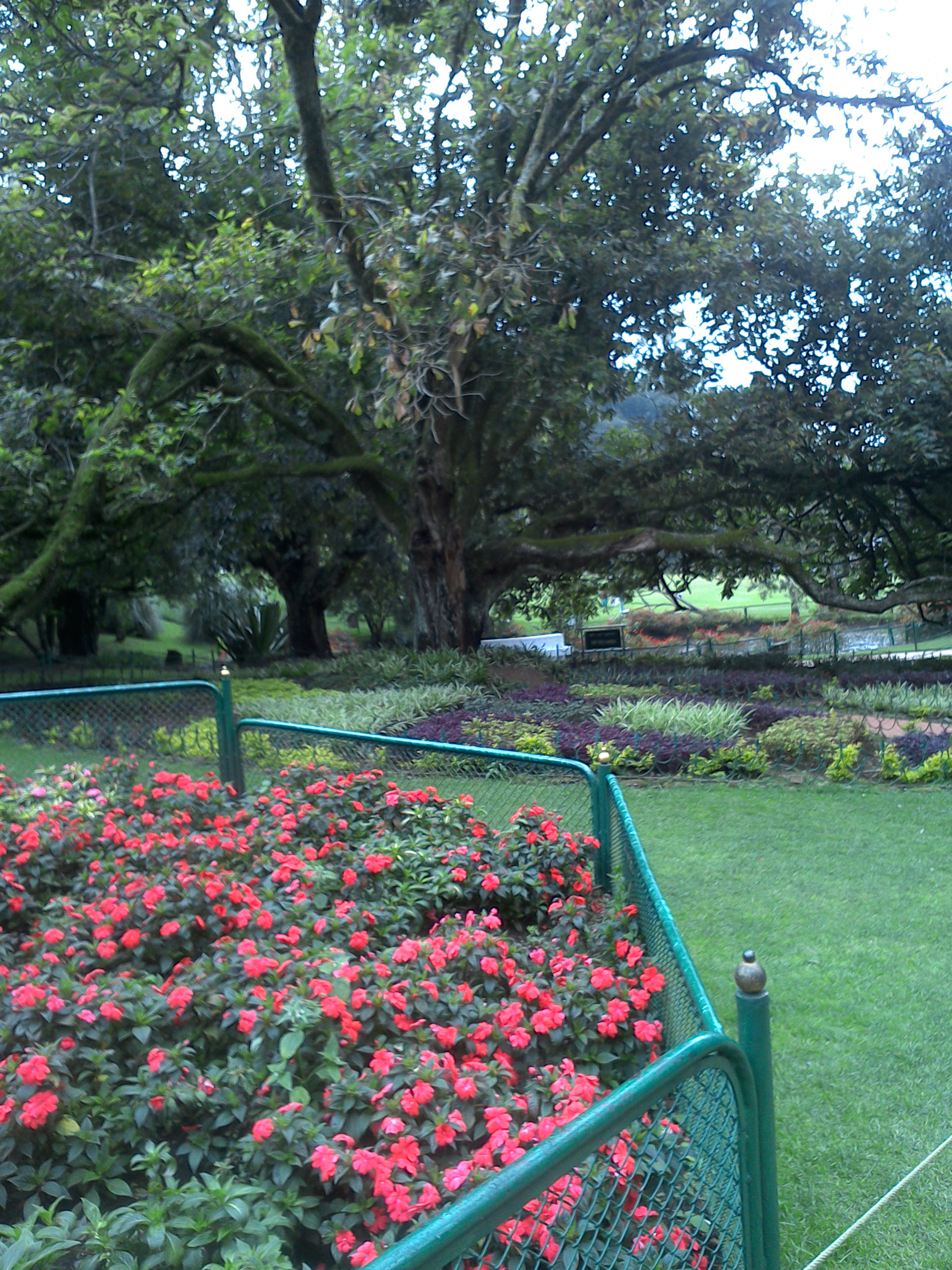

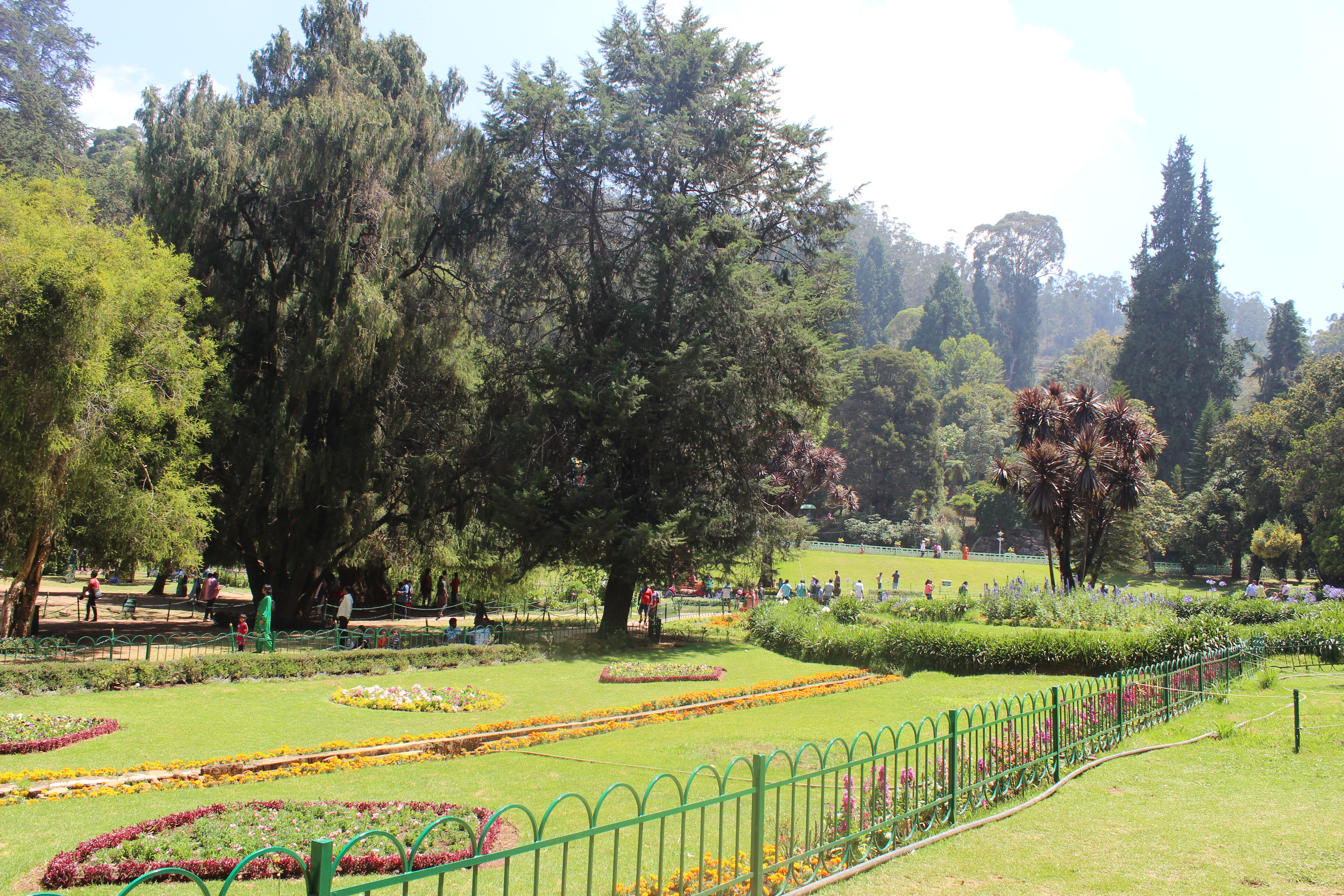
Botanical garden view

The Government Botanical Garden is a botanical garden in Udhagamandalam, near Coimbatore (Ooty), Tamil Nadu state, India laid out in 1848. The gardens, divided into several sections, cover an area of around 22 hectares (54 acres), and lie on the lower slopes of Doddabetta peak. The garden has a terraced layout. It is maintained by the Tamil Nadu Horticulture Department.

It ascends the slopes of the hill at an elevation of 2250–2500 metres above mean sea level. The garden enjoys a temperate climate, with an average rainfall of 140 cm, the most of which is received during south-west monsoon, with frosty nights from November to February. The maximum and minimum temperatures are 28 °C and 0 °C respectively.

== History ==
The Government Botanical Garden, Udhagamandalm, was established in 1848. Its architect was William Graham McIvor. The Marquis of Tweedale prepared the initial layout during the late 1840s. The gardens were established by a subscription of Rs 3 per month amongst the European residents for the purpose of supplying vegetables at a reasonable cost. During the time that Ootacamund was under British control, considerable cultivation of vegetables for the market was carried on by the European settlers and others. Captain Molyneux of the 2nd European Regiment managed the vegetable cultivation. The subscribers received vegetables free of cost. But this arrangement did not work out and in early 1847, a fund was raised by means of donations and subscriptions with a view to forming a horticultural society and a public garden.

There were very few horticulturists at that time. Seeds and saplings were not available locally, but were available in nearby jungles. It was proposed to establish a public garden. For this purpose, wood was selected between Lushington Hall (the present Hebron School) and General Sewell's Property (the present Raj Bhavan). Shortly after

the formation of the society, the committee requested state aid for providing a scientific and practical gardener and funds to meet his salary. This suggestion was accepted, and Mr. W.G. McIvor from the Royal Botanic Gardens, Kew, was sent to Ootacamund by the East India Company. He arrived in March 1848, converted the upper portion, which was a forest, and the lower portion, which was a swamp, into a beautiful garden. He submitted a report at the end of 1848 to the East India Company in London. He took ten years to complete the layout of the garden.

== Collections ==
The gardens have around a thousand species, both exotic and indigenous, of plants, shrubs, ferns, trees, herbal and bonsai plants. In the centre of the gardens lie a fossilized tree trunk estimated to be 20 million years old. The gardens consist of several lawns with flowering plants, ponds with lilies, beds of flowers and ferns laid out in an Italian style, several plots of flowering plants, a variety of medicinal plants.

== Sections ==
The present botanical gardens are divided into six sections: the Lower Garden, New Garden, Italian Garden, Conservatory, Fountain Terrace and Nurseries.

=== Lower Garden ===
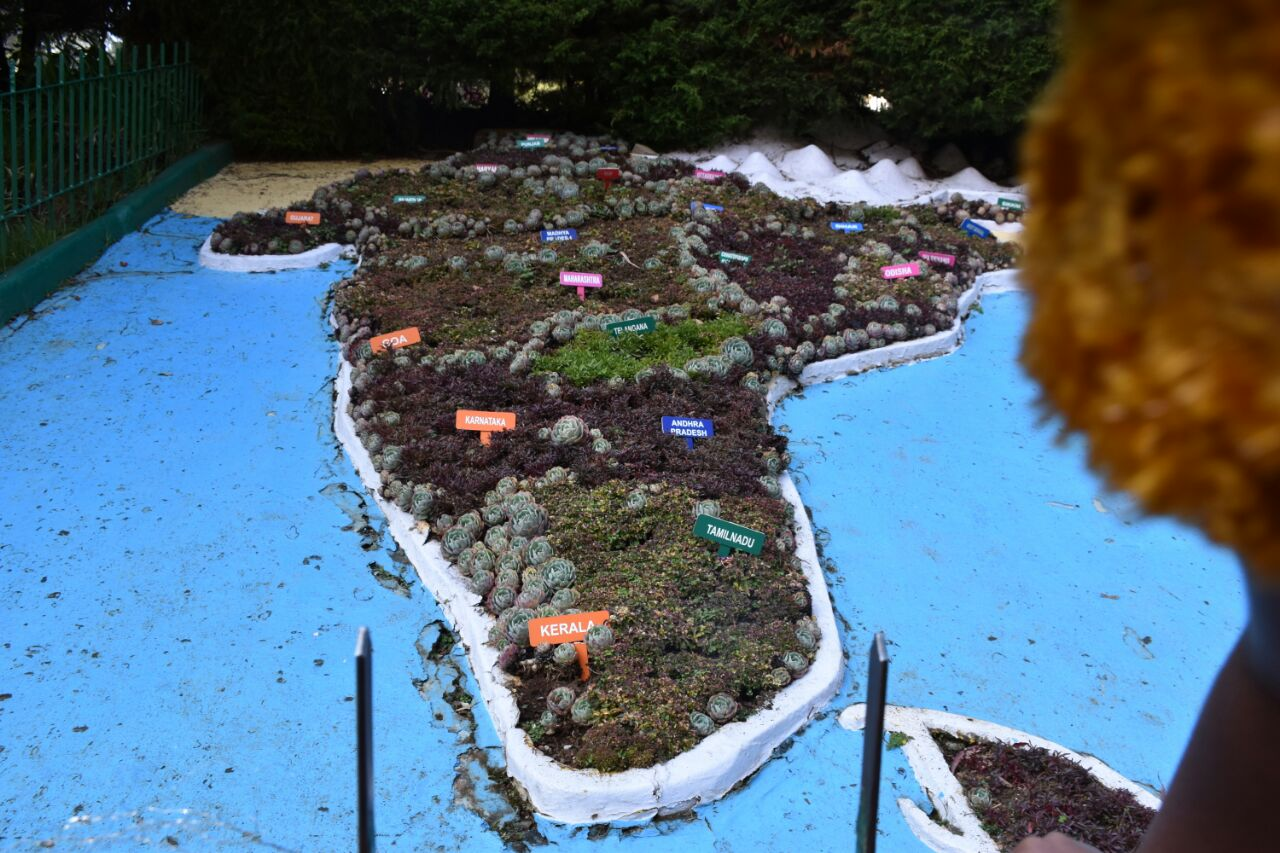
Botanical map of Indian states

The lower garden comprises the entrance and the lower lawns. The entrance of the garden leads into an extensive lush green lawn of Kikiyu grass (Pennisetum Clandestinum) which is known for its springy vigour. A fern house with 127 species of ferns is situated on the left along the road leading to Raj Bhavan amidst another expanse of lawns and historic gatehouses. The prime attractions in this section are the carpet-bet design of the map of the Indian Union laid out with selective plants and the fossil trunk of 20 million years old, erected on a pedestal.

Tree species of botanical interest such as Hymenosporum flavum, Cordyline australis, Cedrus deodara, Cupressus funebris, Araucaria bidwillii, Cupressus macrocarpa, Cryptomeria japonica, Eucalyptus maculata, Eucalyptus citriodora, Salix babylonica, Salix heterophylla, Podocarpus taxifolia, Dracaena lanuginosa, Pinus patula, Rhododendron arboreum, Quercus montana, Quercus cerris, Quercus serrata, Quercus griffithii, Quercus ilex, and Magnolia grandiflora can be seen alongside the lawn.

=== New Garden ===
The new garden developed recently, comprises the area between the front garden and the crescent-shaped pond at the bandstand. This section consists of:

- A rose garden with three hundred varieties of hybrid tea roses, Floribunda and Polyanthas rose varieties.
- Large number of flowerbeds designed to match the slopes and contour of this area.
- Carpet-bed emblems of the Government of Tamil Nadu and the Government of India.
- Natural ponds with aquatic plants.

Important tree species such as Taxodium mucronatum, Pieris ovalifolia, Juniperus virginiana, Eucalyptus eugenioides, Pinus wallichiana, Photinia lindleyana, Pinus canariensils, Ginkgo biloba, Araucaria cunninghamii and Cupressus lawsoniana are planted all over the section.

=== Italian Garden ===
This garden was first laid out by Italian prisoners of during the Second World War. They were placed under the control of the Military station in Ootacamund. Asters, ageratum, balsam, begonia, petunia, pansy, phlox, cosmos, zinnia and perennial flowers like salvia, delphinium, larkspur, and dahlia are the main attraction in this garden.

The informal landscape of the garden from the entrance, merge into the formal fashioned beds laid out in an Italian pattern, surrounding the centrally situated octagonal bandstand. This part of the garden looks attractive with several varieties of colourful annuals. In the foreground, is a crescent-shaped lily pond for growing several varieties of aquatic plant species. The tree species grown in this part of the garden are Prunus cerasoides, Saurauja nepaulensis, Grevillea hilliana, Aesculus punduana, Pinus sabineana, Cupressus torulosa, Syncarpia glomulifera, Pinus roxburghii, Albizzia julibrissin, etc.

=== The Conservatory ===
The public conservatory was constructed in 1912 with the objective of grouping various flowering plants. Colourful annuals and perennials like Cineraria, Schizanthus, Calceolaria, Balsam, Cyclamen, Gloxinia, Tuberous begonia, Coleus, Geranium, Chrysanthemum, Primulas, Tydea, Achemenes, etc., find a place in this conservatory.

The bog garden lies towards the east of this conservatory and forms an adjunct to provide a good site for marsh loving plants such as the Weeping willow, Hedychium, Arum, Hydrangea etc.

=== The Nurseries ===
The nurseries which are about 100 metres above the lower lawns, consist of eight glass-houses and a series of terraces for introduction and breeding of exotic plants. The glass-houses are utilized for growing Begonias, Ferns, Cacti, Succulents, Orchids and Bulbous plants for providing a continuous supply of potted plants to be grouped periodically in the conservatories. The terraces are utilised for growing plants for cut flowers, seed and also for trial purposes.

== The flower show ==
The first flower show was organised in the year 1896 by the chairman of the Nilgiris Agri-Horticultural Society, Mr.J.H. Tremenhere, the then Collector of Nilgiris. The government took over the flower show from the Nilgiris Agri-Horticultural Society in 1980 by forming a committee called the Nilgiris Flower and Fruit Show Committee. The flower show attracts about 150,000 tourists each year from all over the world.

The flower show is held for two to five days. The inauguration of the show is held on the first day and on the second day, prizes are distributed to winners of various competitions held in connection with flower show. About 250 exhibitors participate in different categories on the day of flower show. Several government departments and voluntary agencies also display their activities for the benefits of the flower lovers and tourists.

More than 50 varieties of potted plants, 150 varieties of cut flowers, various kinds of tropical and temperate vegetables and tropical and temperate fruits are exhibited by the competitors. The floral decorations, Indian and Japanese flower arrangements, vegetable carving, Flower Rangoli, Bonsai, etc., are the major attractions during the show days. The exclusive cut flower stalls from large private and public gardens are also an attraction during the show days. 59 rolling cups, 250 cups and cash prizes are awarded to the best competitors and exhibitors.

A garden competition is also held involving Estate Gardens, Private Cottage Gardens, Public Gardens and various other categories of gardens, to create greater awareness among flower growers. On an average, about 200 gardens compete in the event. Garden competition is held prior to the flower show and best gardens are awarded prizes and cups.

== The Fossil Tree Trunk ==
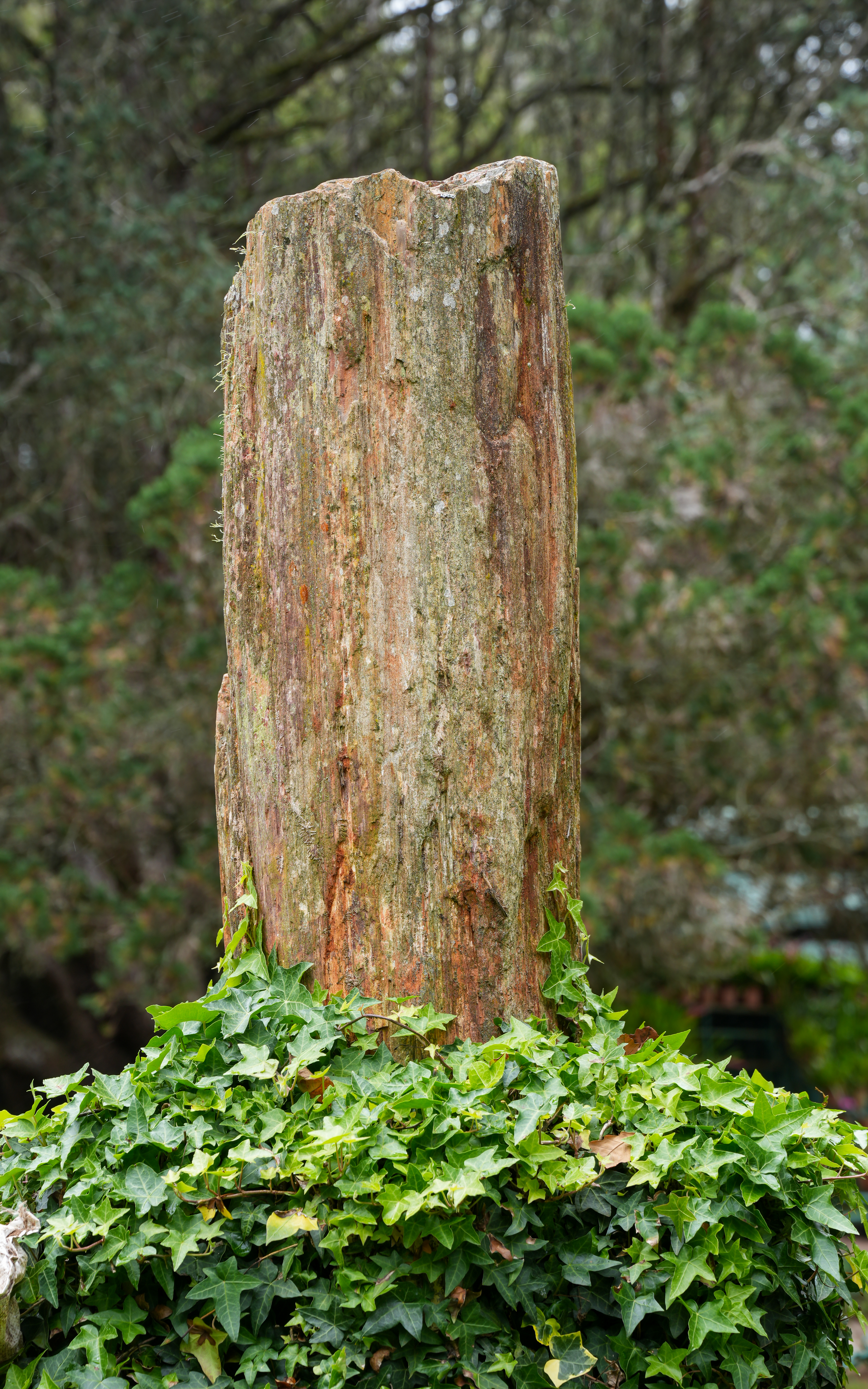
20 million year old fossil tree trunk

The fossil tree trunk displayed in the garden is from 20 million years old. Trees carried by rivers and deposited in inland lakes were transformed with replacement of the woody matter by silica give rise to fossil tree trunks (see Polystrate fossil). The fossil tree was presented by the Geological Survey of India, from the National Fossil Park, Tiruvakkarai, South Arcot district, Tamil Nadu.

== Arboretum ==
The arboretum covers 1.58 ha. which was established during the year 1992 and maintained by Department of Horticulture with Hill Area Development Programme funds and it is situated near the lake, Udhagai. It was established with an aim of conserving native and indigenous trees. The micro watershed area leading to Ooty lake was neglected and the feeder line feeding water to Ooty was contaminated with urban waste and agricultural chemicals. The area is a natural habitat of both indigenous and migratory birds. To conserve flora and fauna of the Nilgiri, the area was developed into the Arboretum. During the year 2005–2006, it was rehabilitated by the funds provided by the Hill Area Development Programme to the tune of 12.50 lakhs by providing permanent fencing, a food path and other infrastructure facilities. Various indigenous and exotic tree species of are grown in arboretum and conserved. About 80 trees have been planted in the arboretum. The different type of tree species planted in arboretum are Alnus nepalensis, Callistemon lanceolatus, Cupressus macrocarpa, Eugenia apiculata, Hypericum hookerianum, Podocarpus elongata, Populus deltoides, Quercus macrocarpa, Salix babylonica, Taxodium mucronatum, and Prunus pissardii.

In order to add more species to the arboretum the following tree species were also planted: Celtis tetrandra, Dillenia pentagyna, Elaeocarpres ferrugineus, Elaeocarpres oblongus, Evodia lunuankenda, Glochidion neilgherrense, Ligustrum perrotetti, Litsaea ligustrina, Litsaea wightiana, Meliosma arnotiana, Meliosma wightii, Michelia champaca, Michelia nilagirica, Pygeum gardneri, Syzygium amothanum, Syzygium montanum, Alnus nepalensis, Viburnum erubescens, Podocarpus wallichianus, Rhodomyrtus tomentosa, Rapanea wightiana, Ternstroemia japonica, Microtropis microcarpa, Psychotria congesta, Photinea notoniana, Cedrela toona, Symplocos cochinchinensis, Elaeocarpus ganitrus, Platanus orientalis, Jacaranda mimosaefolia, and Magnolia grandiflora

== The Toda Mund ==
The garden is also famous for the Toda hill called the Toda mund. This place gives the visitors an insight into the lives of the original tribes of Ooty called the Todas.

== Photo gallery ==
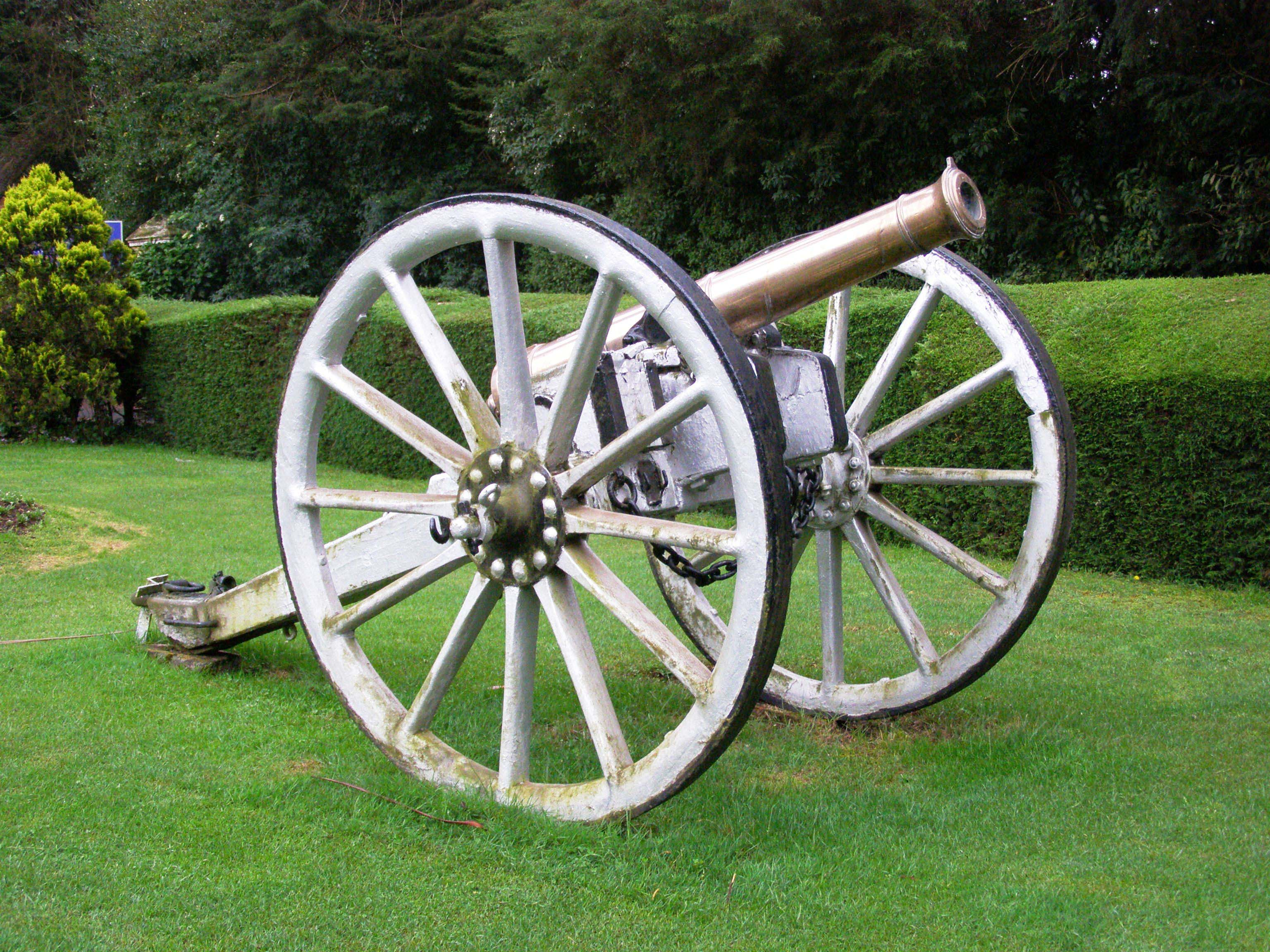

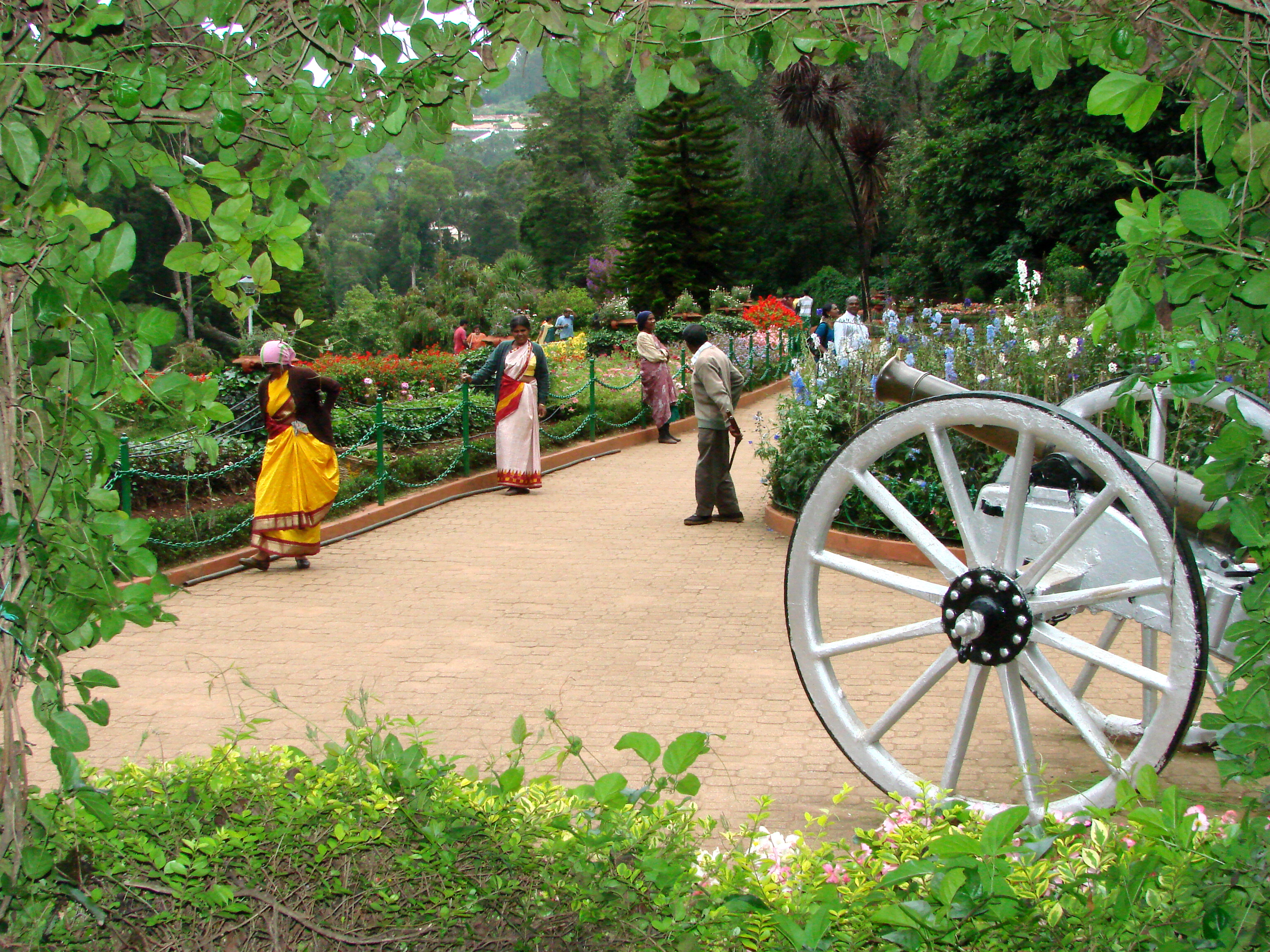

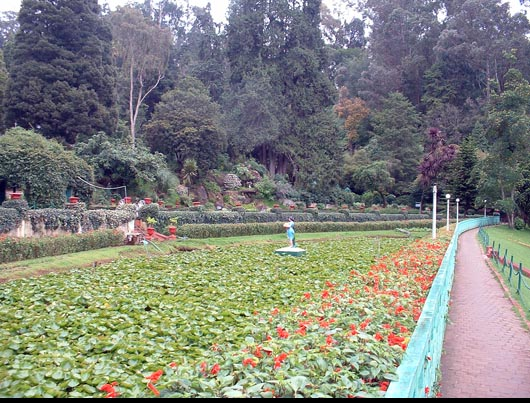
Lotus pond

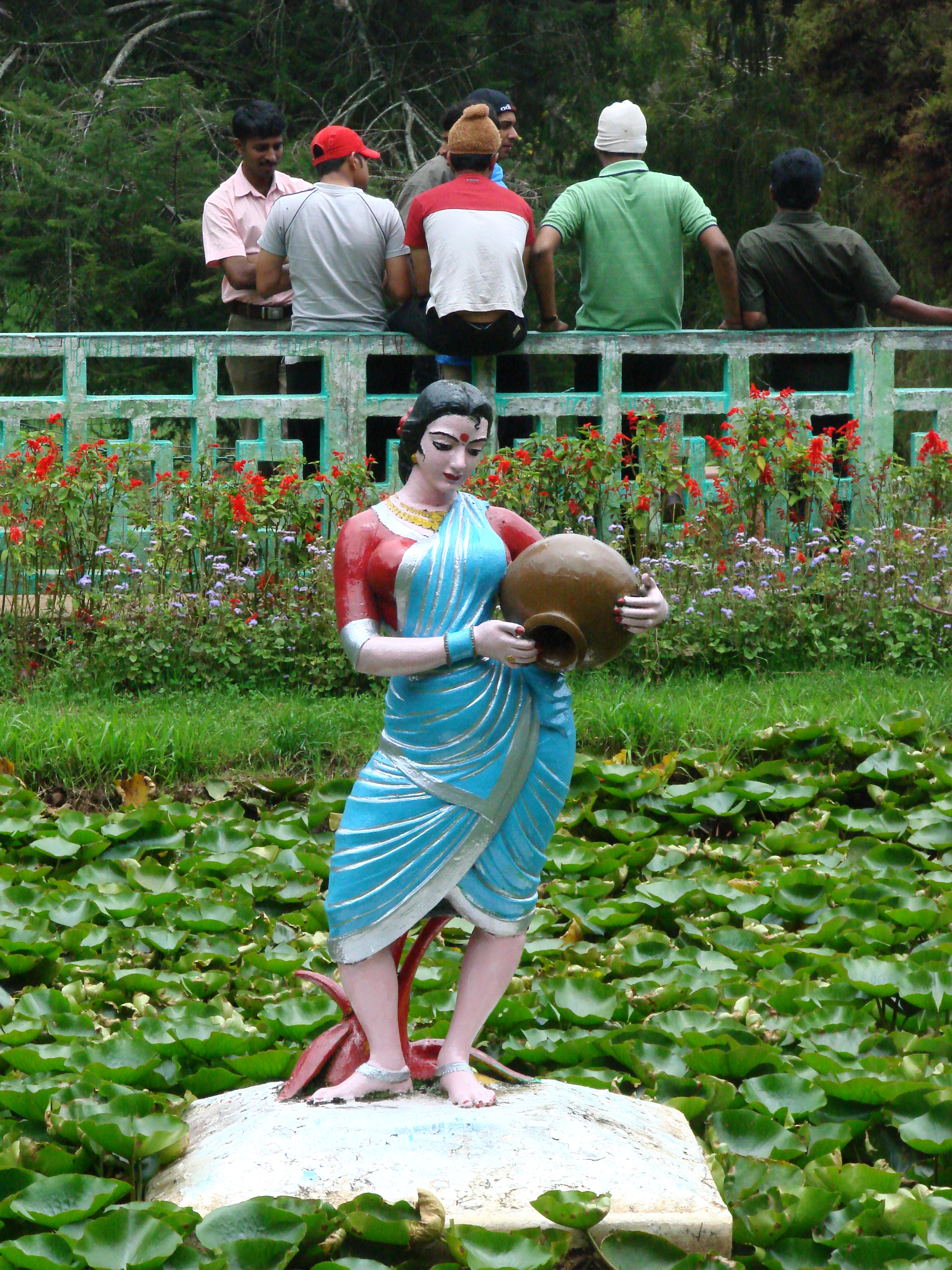

Sunken garden

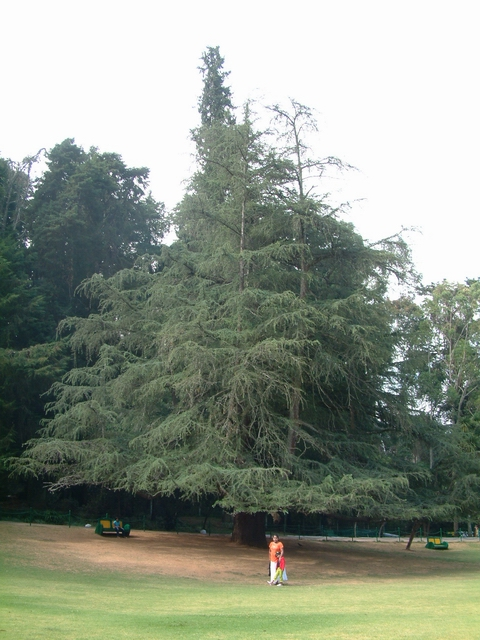

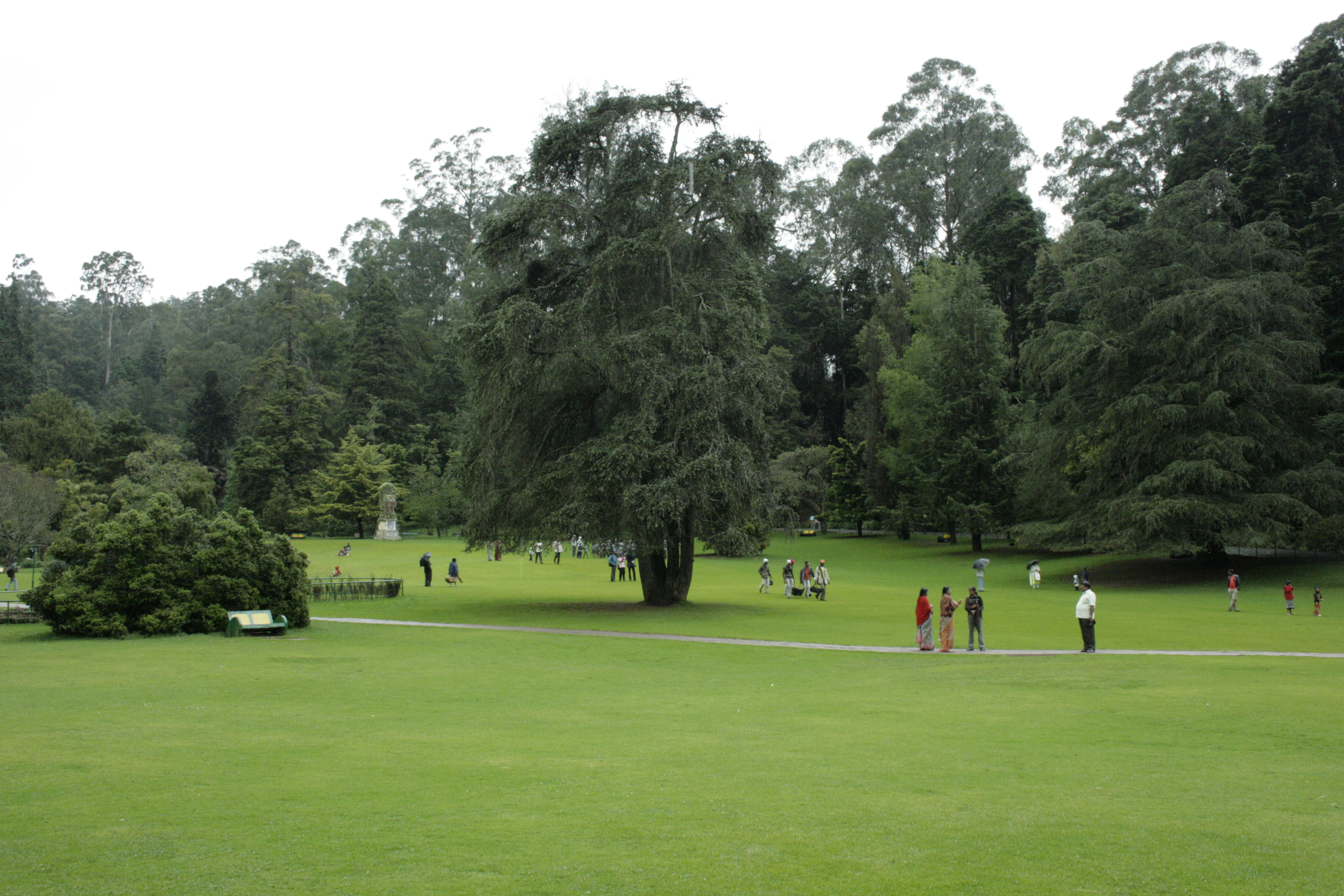

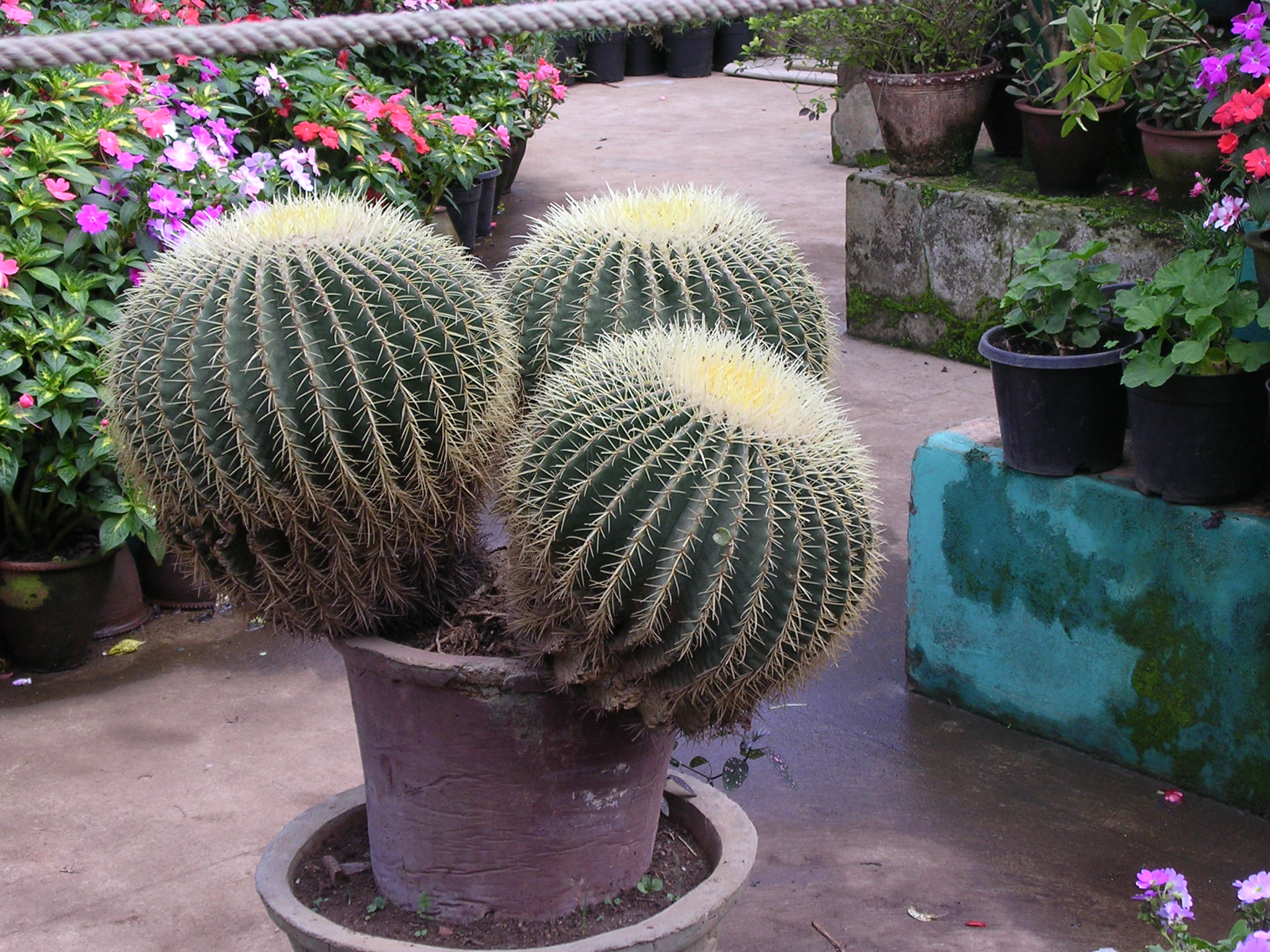
Echinocactus grusonii

== In popular culture ==
A number of song and dance routines have been filmed in the gardens. These include sequences in Suhaag (1979), Teri rab ne banadi jodi, starring Shashi Kapoor, Parveen Babi, Rekha and Amitabh Bachchan; and the song Sato janam me, from Dilwale (1994) starring Ajay Devgn.

== See also ==
- List of botanical gardens in India
- List of botanical gardens
- Herbalism
