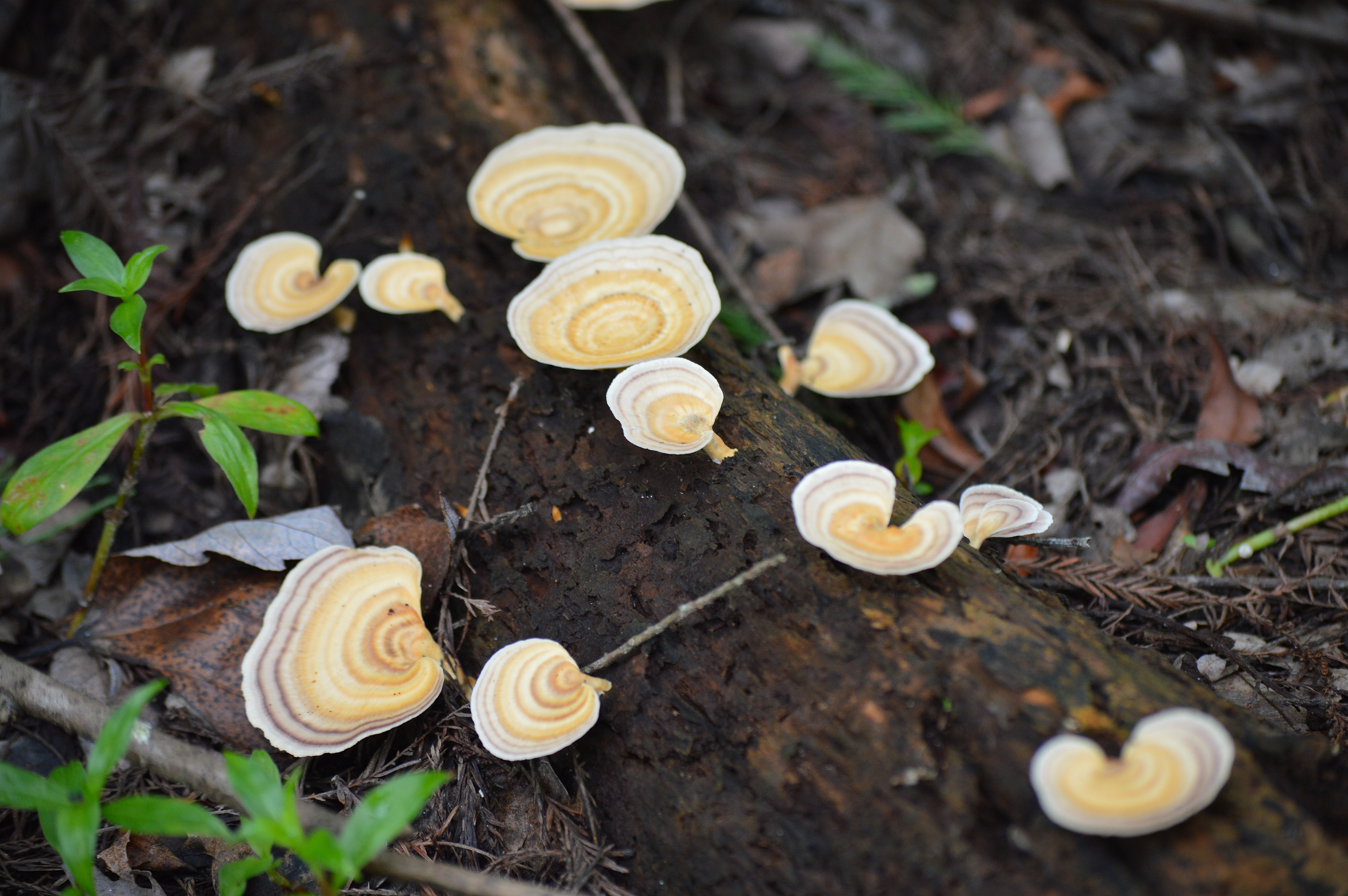
- Microporellus obovatus

Scientific classification
- Kingdom: Fungi
- Division: Basidiomycota
- Class: Agaricomycetes
- Order: Polyporales
- Family: Polyporaceae
- Genus: Microporellus; Murrill (1905)

Type species
- Microporellus dealbatus (Berk. & M.A.Curtis) Murrill (1905)

Synonyms
- Cystostiptoporus Dhanda & Ryvarden (1975)

= Microporellus =

Genus of fungi

Microporellus is a genus of poroid fungi in the family Polyporaceae.

== Taxonomy ==
The genus was circumscribed by American mycologist William Murrill in 1905 with Microporellus dealbatus as the type species. Murrill intended to the genus to contain polypores with stipes. The generic concept was emended in 1985 by David and Rachenberg. After examining the type of Polyporus dealbatus, they reported for the first time the presence of dextrinoid skeletal hyphae and incrusted cystidia, a unique combination of characters in the Polyporales. Ryvarden and Dhandha had previously (1975) used this combination of characters to erect Cystostiptoporus, a genus that had Cystostiptoporus indicus as the type species. Due to the Principle of Priority, the earlier-published name is preferred, and Cystostiptoporus was therefore sunk into synonymy with Microporellus. In 1987, E. J. H. Corner further emended Microporellus by including species without cystidia, and also some trimitic species. Decock broadened the genus in 2001 by including two species with stipes: Microporellus celtis, and M. peninsularis. The latter fungus has since been transferred back to its original genus Vanderbylia.

== Species ==
- Microporellus adextrinoideus Decock (2007)
- Microporellus amazonicus P.S.Medeiros & Ryvarden (2011)
- Microporellus brasiliensis Ryvarden & Decock (2002) – Brazil
- Microporellus brunneus Corner (1987) – Malaysia
- Microporellus celtis (T.T.Chang & W.N. Chou) Decock (2001) – Taiwan
- Microporellus clemensiae (Murrill) Ryvarden (1985)
- Microporellus collybiiformis (Beeli) Ryvarden (1974)
- Microporellus dealbatus (Berk. & M.A.Curtis) Murrill (1905)
- Microporellus ellipsosporus Decock & Ryvarden (2002) – Senegal
- Microporellus fuliginosus Corner (1987)
- Microporellus grandiporus Corner (1987)
- Microporellus holotephrus (Berk. & M.A.Curtis) Murrill (1905)
- Microporellus iguazuensis Rajchenb. (1987) – Argentina
- Microporellus inusitatus (Lloyd) Corner (1987)
- Microporellus labyrinthiformis Corner (1987)
- Microporellus nigripes Corner (1987)
- Microporellus obovatus (Jungh.) Ryvarden (1972)
- Microporellus pahangensis Corner (1987)
- Microporellus papuensis Decock (2007)
- Microporellus setigerus Corner (1987)
- Microporellus subumbonatus Corner (1987)
- Microporellus violaceocinerascens (Petch) A.David & Rajchenb. (1985)

Microporellus subincarnatus, described by E. J. H. Corner from Brazilian collections in 1987, was later shown to be the same species as Perenniporia stipitata.
