= Microporellus adextrinoideus =

Scientific classification
- Kingdom: Fungi
- Division: Basidiomycota
- Class: Agaricomycetes
- Order: Polyporales
- Family: Polyporaceae
- Genus: Microporellus
- Species: M. adextrinoideus

Binomial name
- Microporellus adextrinoideus Decock

Species of fungus

Microporellus adextrinoideus is a species of poroid fungus in the family Polyporaceae that was described as a new species in 2007. The holotype, collected in Ivindo National Park (Ogooué-Ivindo Province, Gabon), was found growing on soil among mosses at the base of a dead tree stump. The fungus makes a semicircular, cork-coloured fruit body that is up to 30 mm (1.2 in) tall. Its spores are more or less ellipsoid in shape, with typical dimensions of 6.4 by 4.7 μm. At the time of publication, M. adextrinoideus is the only Microporellus species having skeletal hyphae that are non-dextrinoid.
