= William Graham McIvor =

Scottish gardener and superintendent

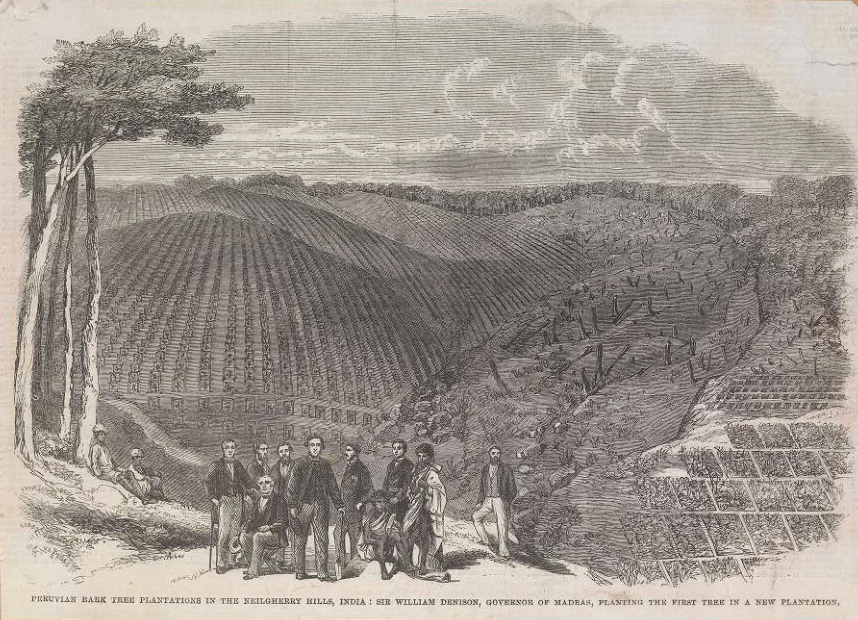
Drawing of the Cinchona plantations from Illustrated London News 6 December 1862. Sir William Denison sits with W.G. McIvor to his left (with a spade in his left hand and hat in right).

William Graham McIvor (1824 or 1825 - 8 June 1876) was a Scottish gardener and superintendent of the Neilgherry Cinchona plantations in Ootacamund, India who was responsible for the successful introduction of cinchona plants in the Nilgiris in the 1860s.

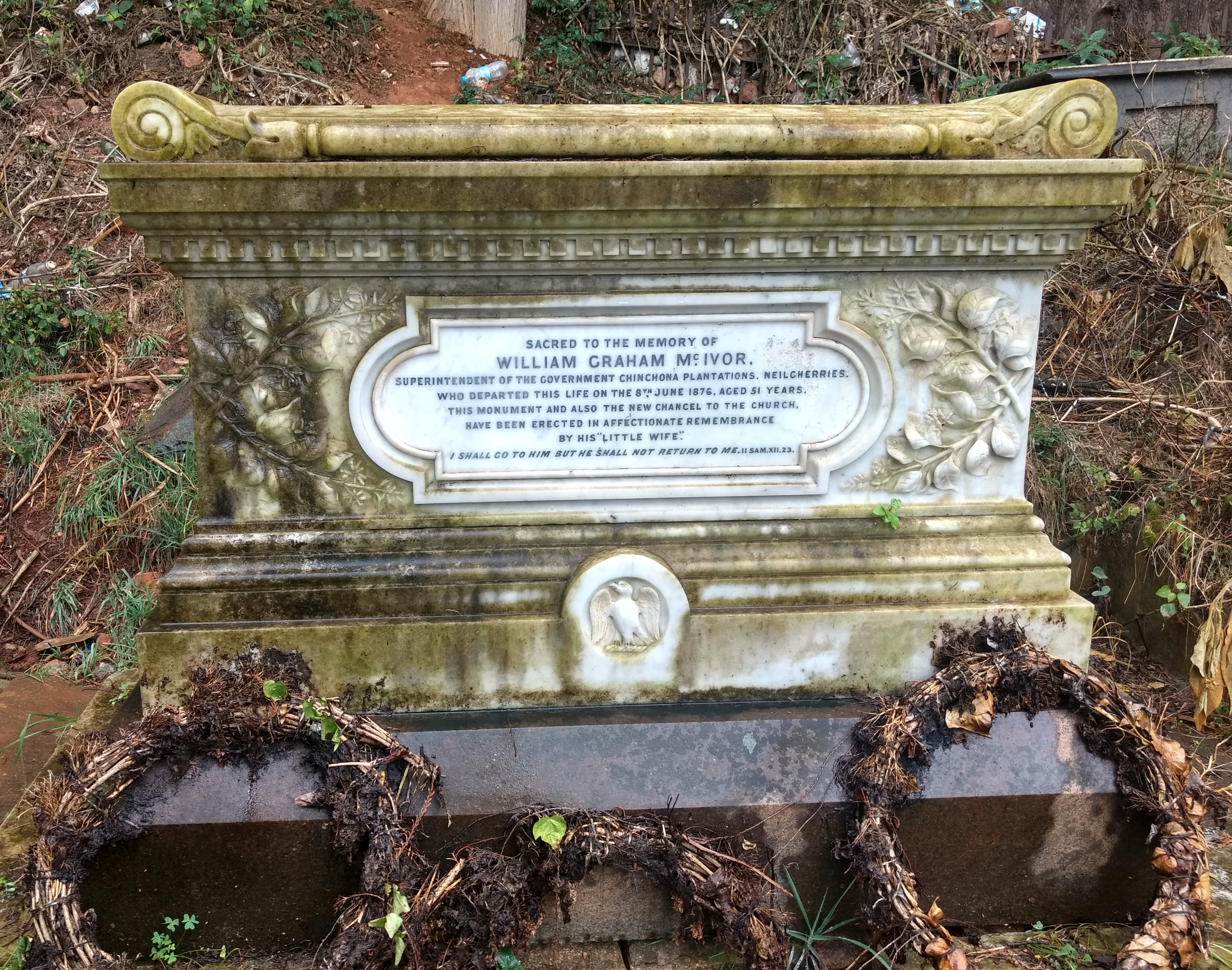
Tomb of McIvor at Ootacamund with relief showing Cinchona plants

McIvor was born in Dollar in Scotland where his father John had settled after working to establish a nursery garden at Crieff. McIvor trained in horticulture and arboriculture and worked at Kew before taking up in 1848, a position in southern India as superintendent of the yet to be established Ootacamund botanical garden. At Kew, McIvor took an interest in bryophytes and published an exsiccata of British hepatics under the title Hepaticae Britannicae, or, pocket herbarium of British Hepaticae, named and arranged according to the most improved system, by William Graham McIvor, Royal Gardens, Kew in 1847. He established the botanical garden at Ootacamund and worked there until his death. He married Anne, eldest daughter of Colonel Edwards of Iscoed, Denbighshire on 31 May 1850. McIvor received cinchona plants in 1861 that had been brought from South America by Clements Markham. The first set of plants died but later batches consisting of other species (especially Cinchona succirubra) did well. McIvor found that removing strips of barks and allowing them to heal by covering them in moss improved the sustainability of harvesting bark from the trees.

McIvor ran into troubles with the Madras Government on handling a subordinate who was given to drinking. He also faced labour shortages which were for a while solved by importing Chinese convicts from the Straits Settlements. The labour situation eased in 1877 due to the famine in the plains and an influx into the Niligiris. Unlike many others of the period who believed that deforestation had a negative effect on water flow in streams, he believed that water flows in streams increased as a result of the removal of trees in the Nilgiris. He pointed out that there was a great reduction in transpiration and that this might in turn have an effect on reduced rainfall.

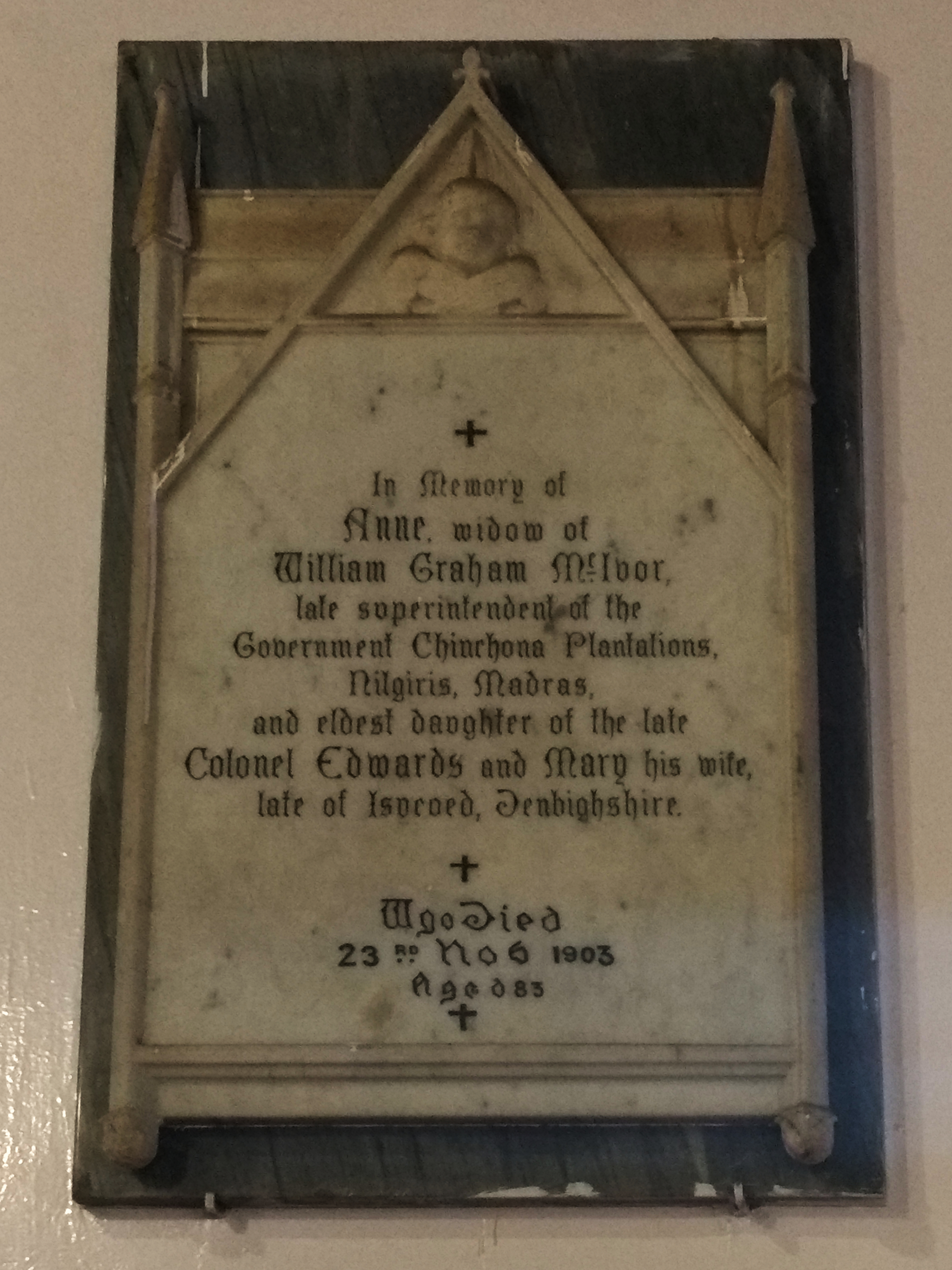
Memorial tablet to Anne McIvor at Ooty

His funeral was attended by most government officers and among those present included Colonel R. H. Beddome.

The standard author abbreviation McIvor is used to indicate this person as the author when citing a botanical name.
