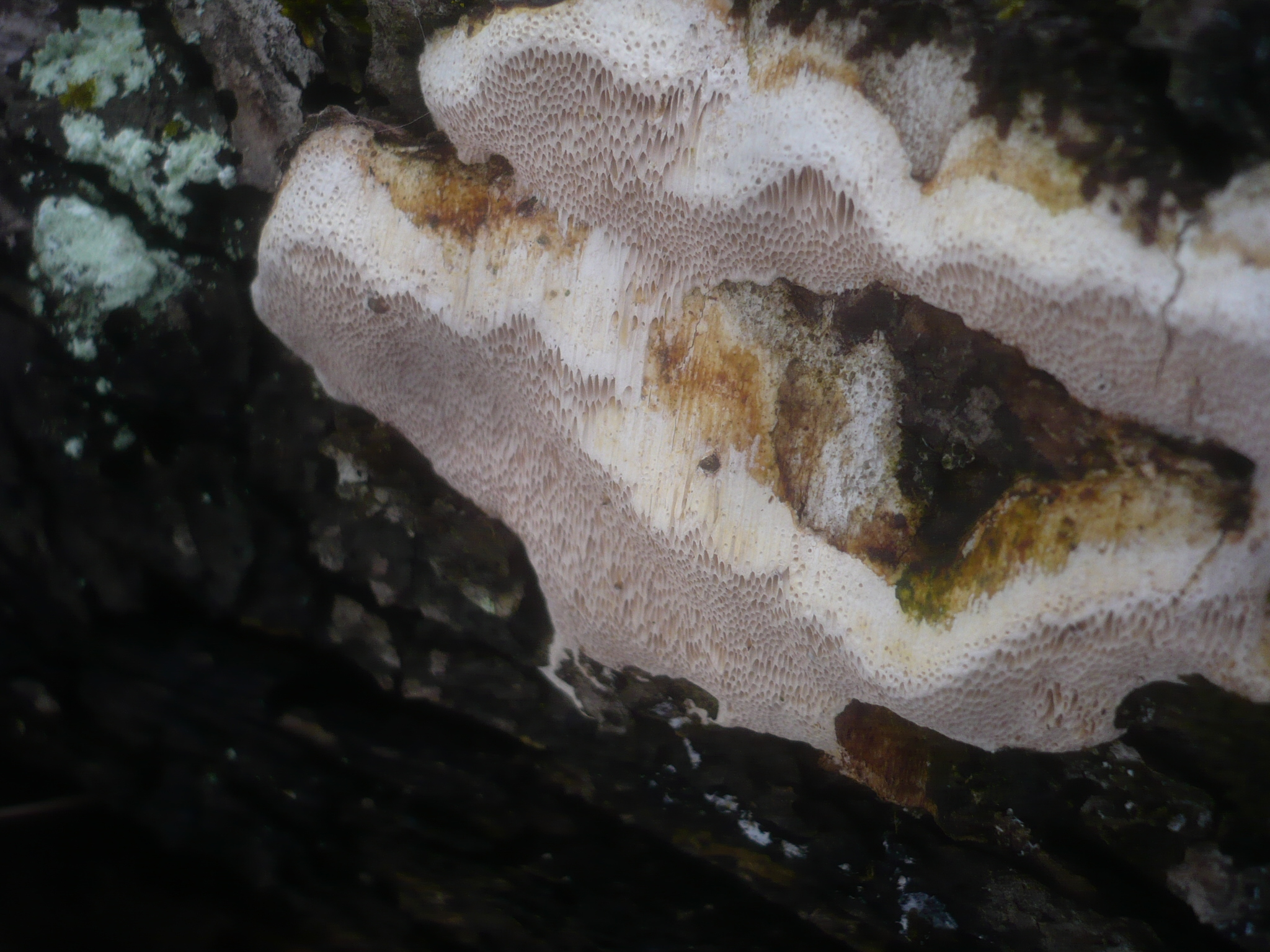
- Perenniporia medulla-panis

Scientific classification
- Kingdom: Fungi
- Division: Basidiomycota
- Class: Agaricomycetes
- Order: Polyporales
- Family: Polyporaceae
- Genus: Perenniporia; Murrill (1942)

Type species
- Perenniporia medulla-panis (Jacq.) Donk (1967)

Synonyms
- Poria Pers. (1794); Leptopora Raf. (1808); Physisporus Chevall. (1826); Poroptyche Beck (1888); Merulioporia Bondartsev & Singer (1941); Merulioporia Bondartsev & Singer (1943); Riopa D.A.Reid (1969); Loweporus J.E.Wright (1976); Hornodermoporus Teixeira (1993)

= Perenniporia =

Genus of fungi

Perenniporia is a cosmopolitan genus of bracket-forming or crust-like polypores in the family Polyporaceae. They are dimitic or trimitic with smooth, thick-walled basidiospores and cause a white rot in affected wood.

== Taxonomy ==
Perenniporia was proposed by American mycologist William Alphonso Murrill in 1943 to contain two species formerly placed in Poria, a genus formerly used to contain all crust-like poroid fungi. His description of the genus was: "Hymenophore become perennial, riding; context white or yellow; tubes pinkish, white or yellow, stratose in older specimens; spores hyaline." Murrill's concept was to move the species with annual fruit bodies (Poria unita and Poria nigriscens) into Perenniporia, retaining Poria for those that produced perennial fruit bodies. The genus name combines the Latin word perennis ("perennial") with the genus name Poria Edalat.

Murrill's designated type species, P. unita, had a broad and poorly defined species concept that included other species, including Perenniporia medulla-panis. Additionally, P. unita was discovered to be a nomen dubium, which also threatened the validity of the genus Perenniporia. To remedy this nomenclatural instability, Cony Decock and Joost Stalpers proposed to conserve Perenniporiella with P. medulla-panis as the type.

Although Truncospora has traditionally been considered a synonym of Perenniporia, molecular phylogenetic analysis shows that it is genetically unique and worthy of recognition as a distinct genus. Genera that have been segregated from Perenniporia include Perenniporiopsis and Perenniporiella.

== Ecology ==
"Poria" species have historically been listed as food for several animals, such as the pleasing fungus beetles Haematochiton elateroides and Ischyrus quadripunctatus. Whether this referred to a species nowadays placed in Perenniporia, or some other crust fungus, is rarely determinable today.

== Species ==
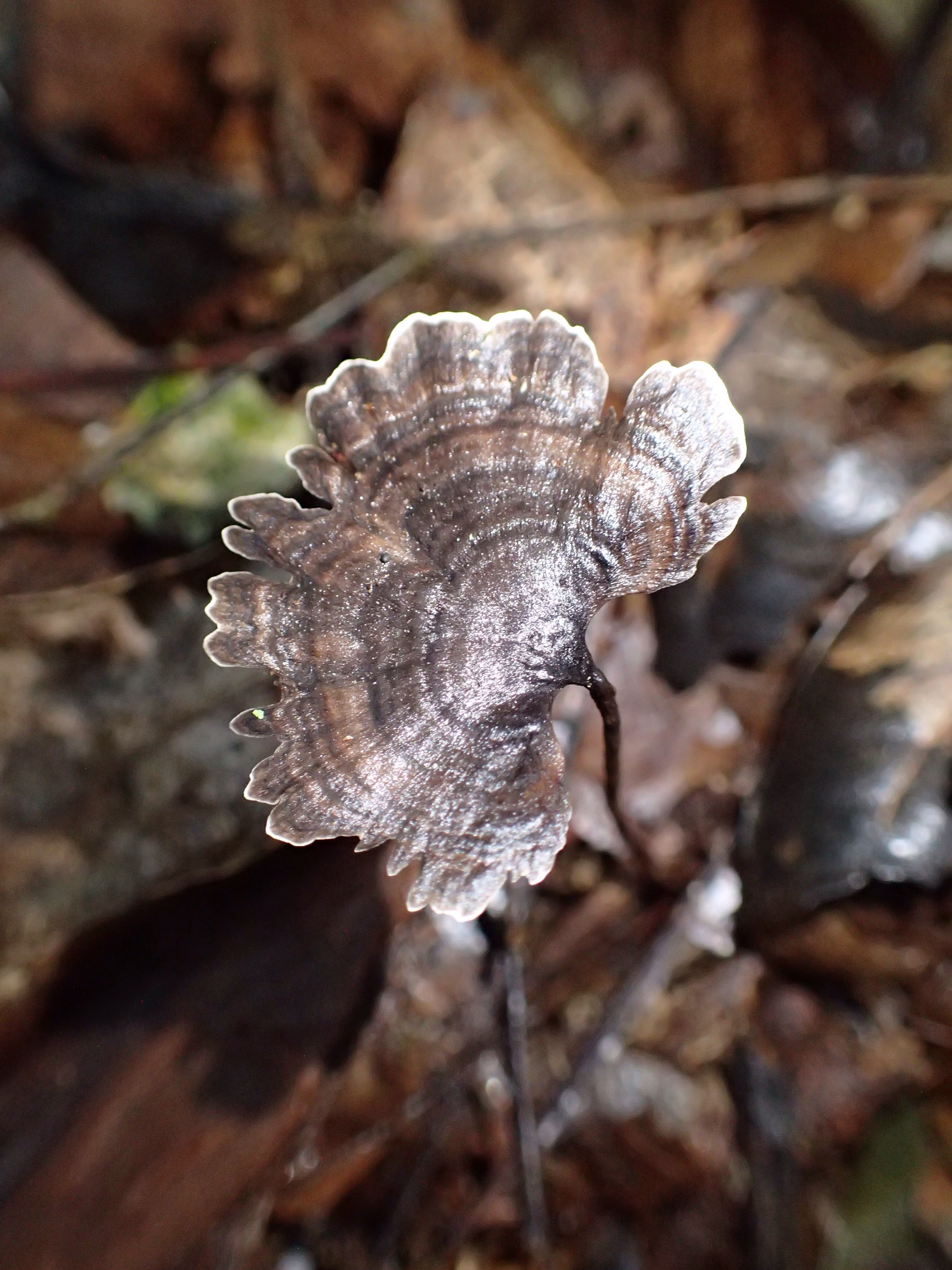
Perenniporia stipitata is named for its prominent stipe, a feature that is rare in genus Perenniporia.

The following species are accepted in the genus Perenniporia:

- P. abyssinica Decock & Bitew (2012)
- P. adnata Corner (1989)
- P. afrominuta Ryvarden (2018)
- P. afrostipitata T.W. Henkel & Ryvarden (2018)
- P. albocinnamomea Corner (1989)
- P. alboferruginea Decock (2011)
- P. alboincarnata (Pat. & Gaillard) Decock & Ryvarden (2011)
- P. amazonica M.A.De Jesus & Ryvarden (2010)
- P. amylodextrinoidea Gilb. & Ryvarden (1987)
- P. arenosobasus (Lloyd) Ryvarden (2022)
- P. bartholomei (Peck) Gibertoni & Bernicchia (2006)
- P. beninensis Olou & Ryvarden (2021)
- P. bostonensis C.L. Zhao (2018)
- P. brasiliensis C.R.S.de Lira, A.M.S.Soares, Ryvarden & Gibertoni (2017)
- P. centrali-africana Decock & Mossebo (2002)
- P. chiangraiensis F.Wu & X.H.Ji (2017)
- P. chromatica (Berk. & Cooke) Decock & Ryvarden (1999)
- P. citrinoalba B.K. Cui, C.L. Zhao & Y.C. Dai (2019)
- P. compacta Ryvarden & Gilb. (1984)
- P. contraria (Berk. & M.A.Curtis) Ryvarden (1972)
- P. corticola (Corner) Decock (2001)
- P. cremeopora Decock & Ryvarden (2000)
- P. cunninghami Decock, P.K.Buchanan & Ryvarden (2000)
- P. cystidiata Y.C.Dai, W.N.Chou & Sheng H.Wu (2002)
- P. dendrohyphidia Ryvarden (1988)
- P. densipora Ryvarden (2019)
- P. dipterocarpicola T.Hatt. & S.S.Lee (1999)
- P. djaensis Decock & Mossebo (2002)
- P. duplexa Ryvarden (2016)
- P. ellisiana (F.W.Anderson) Gilb. & Ryvarden (1985)
- P. ethiopica Gminder & Ryvarden (2021)
- P. eugeissonae P. Du & Chao G. Wang (2020)
- P. fergusii Gilb. & Ryvarden (1987)
- P. ferruginea Corner (1989)
- P. floridiana (Vlasák & Spirin) Ryvarden (2023)
- P. formosana T.T.Chang (1994)
- P. fraxinophila (Peck) Ryvarden (1972)
- P. fulviseda (Bres.) Dhanda (1981)
- P. ganodermoides Ryvarden, Gomes-Silva & Gibertoni (2016)
- P. globispora Ipulet & Ryvarden (2005)
- P. gomezii Rajchenb. & J.E.Wright (1982)
- P. guyanensis Decock & Ryvarden (2011)
- P. hainaniana B.K.Cui & C.L.Zhao (2013)
- P. hexagonoides T.Hatt. & S.S.Lee (1999)
- P. inflexibilis (Berk.) Ryvarden (1972)
- P. isabellina (Pat.) Ryvarden (1983)
- P. japonica (Yasuda) T.Hatt. & Ryvarden (1994)
- P. koreana Y.Jang & J.J.Kim (2015) – South Korea
- P. luteola B.K.Cui & C.L.Zhao (2013)
- P. malvena (Lloyd) Ryvarden (1989)
- P. martia (Berk.) Ryvarden (1972)
- P. medulla-panis (Jacq.) Donk (1967)
- P. meridionalis Decock & Stalpers (2006)
- P. mesoleuca (Petch) Ryvarden (1972)
- P. miniochroleuca Ryvarden (2019)
- P. minutopora Ryvarden & Decock (2000)
- P. mopanshanensis C.L. Zhao (2019)
- P. mundula (Wakef.) Ryvarden (1972)
- P. nanjenshana T.T.Chang & W.N.Chou (2000)
- P. nigra Metsebing, Fabrice, Oba, Mossebo & Ryvarden (2019)
- P. nonggangensis F.C.Huang & Bin Liu (2017)
- P. nouraguensis Decock (2016)
- P. ohiensis (Berk.) Ryvarden (1972)
- P. oviformis G.Cunn. ex P.K.Buchanan & Ryvarden (1988)
- P. paraguyanensis C.R.S.de Lira & Gibertoni (2017)
- P. parvispora Decock & Ryvarden (2000)
- P. pauciskeletalis Rajchenb. (1988)
- P. penangiana Corner (1989)
- P. permacilenta (Corner) T.Hatt. (2003)
- P. phloiophila Gilb. & M.Blackw. (1984)
- P. piperis (Rick) Rajchenb. (1987)
- P. podocarpi P.K.Buchanan & I.A.Hood (1992)
- P. prunicola Y.C. Dai, Yuan Yuan & Chao G. Wang (2024)
- P. pseudotephropora Chao G. Wang & F. Wu (2020)
- P. puerensis C.L.Zhao (2017) – China
- P. pulvinata Ryvarden (2019)
- P. punctata Hai J. Li & Jing Si (2018)
- P. reflexa Ryvarden (2020)
- P. roseoisabellina (Pat. & Gaillard) Ryvarden (1983)
- P. rosicola Y.C. Dai, Yuan Yuan & Chao G. Wang (2024)
- P. rosmarini A.David & Malençon (1979)
- P. rufidochmia (Corner) T.Hatt. & Sotome (2013)
- P. semistipitata (Lloyd) Gilb. & Ryvarden (1987)
- P. sinuosa Ryvarden (1987)
- P. sprucei Decock & Ryvarden (1999)
- P. stipitata Ryvarden (1987) – Brazil
- P. straminella (Bres.) Ryvarden (1988)
- P. subannosa (Bres.) Decock, S.Herrera & Ryvarden (2001)
- P. subcorticola Chao G. Wang & F. Wu (2020), synonym of Xanthoperenniporia subcorticola (Chao G. Wang & F. Wu) B.K. Cui & X. Ji (2023)
- P. subdendrohyphidia Decock (2001)
- P. subovoidea Decock & Ryvarden (2013)
- P. subrhizomorpha Xue W. Wang, L.W. Zhou & X.M. Tian (2021)
- P. substraminea B.K.Cui & C.L.Zhao (2014)
- P. subtephropora B.K.Cui & C.L.Zhao (2013)
- P. tibetica B.K.Cui & C.L.Zhao (2012)
- P. truncata (Lloyd) Ryvarden (1972)
- P. unita (Pers.) Murrill (1942)
- P. vanhullii Decock & Ryvarden (2015)
- P. variegata Ryvarden & Gilb. (1984)
- P. voeltzkowii (Henn.) Ryvarden (1980)
- P. xantha Decock & Ryvarden (1999)
- P. yinggelingensis B.K. Cui & Y.C. Dai (2019)
