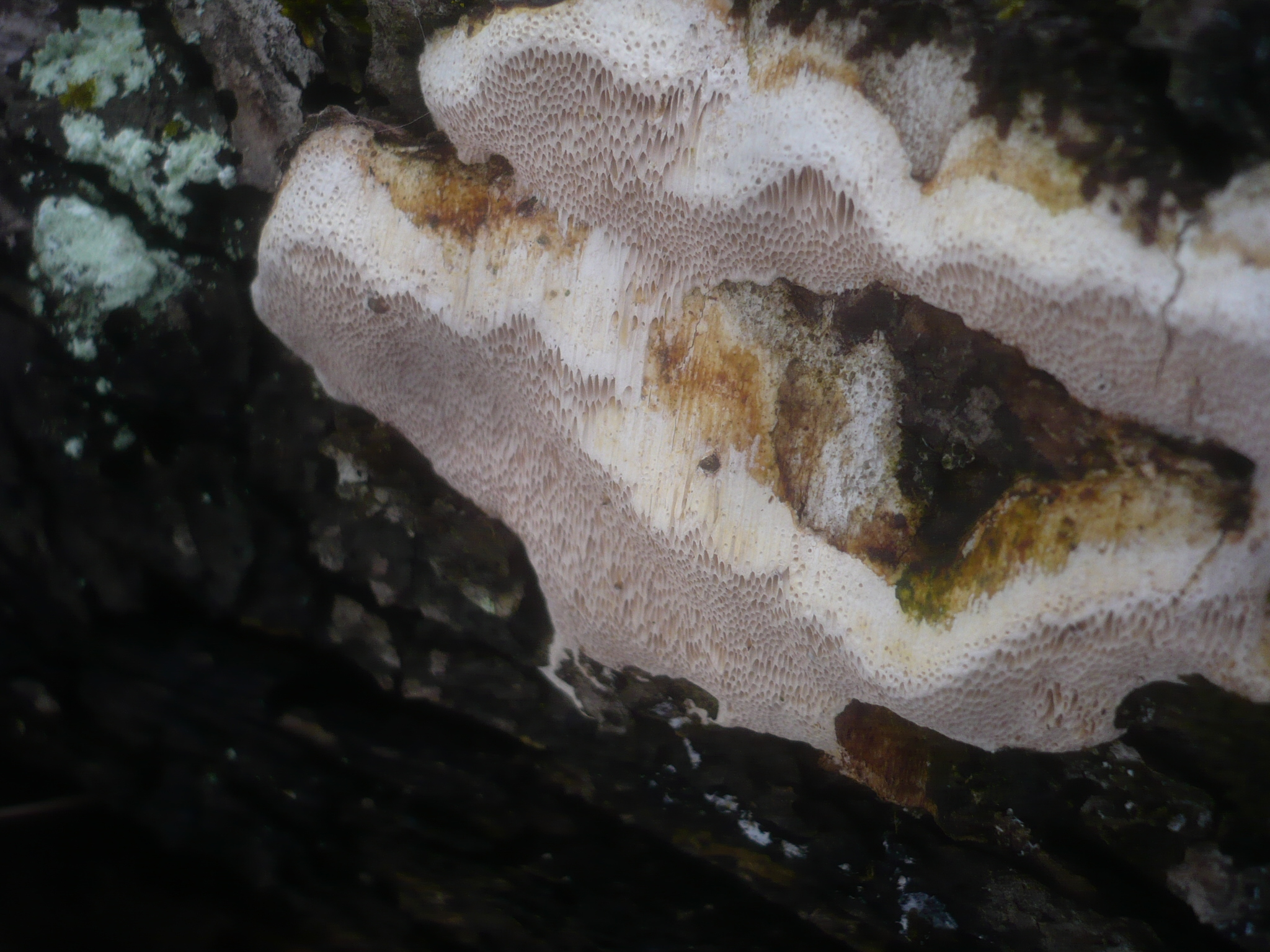

Scientific classification
- Domain: Eukaryota
- Kingdom: Fungi
- Division: Basidiomycota
- Class: Agaricomycetes
- Order: Polyporales
- Family: Polyporaceae
- Genus: Perenniporia
- Species: P. medulla-panis

Binomial name
- Perenniporia medulla-panis (Jacq.) Donk (1967)

Synonyms
- Boletus medulla-panis Jacq. (1778); Daedalea medullaris (Gray) Purton (1821); Fibuloporia unita (Pers.) Bondartsev (1953); Fomes unitus (Pers.) Komarova (1964); Fomes unitus (Pers.) J.Lowe (1964); Fomitopsis medulla-panis (Jacq.) Bondartsev & Singer, (1941); Fomitopsis unita (Pers.) Bondartsev (1953); Microporus limitatus (Berk. & M.A.Curtis) Kuntze (1898); Perenniporia chromatica (Berk. & Broome) Decock & Ryvarden (1999); Perenniporia unita (Pers.) Murrill (1942); Physisporus medulla-panis (Jacq.) Chevall. (1826); Physisporus unitus (Pers.) Gillet (1878); Polyporus alboincarnatus Pat. & Gaillard (1888); Polyporus chromaticus Berk. & Cooke (1876); Polyporus dryinus Berk. & Cooke (1878); Polyporus limitatus Berk. & M.A.Curtis (1872); Polyporus medulla-panis (Jacq.) Fr. (1821); Polyporus unitus Pers. (1825); Polyporus xylostromatis Fuckel (1873); Polystictus limitatus (Berk. & M.A.Curtis) Cooke (1886); Poria chromatica (Berk. & Cooke) Sacc. (1888); Poria dryina (Berk. & Cooke) Sacc. (1888); Poria laevis Speg. (1937); Poria limitata (Berk. & M.A.Curtis) Sacc. (1888); Poria medulla-panis (Jacq.) Pers. (1886); Poria unita (Pers.) Cooke (1886); Poria xylostromatis (Fuckel) Cooke (1886); Trametes medulla-panis (Jacq.) Pat. (1900)

= Perenniporia medulla-panis =

Species of fungus

Perenniporia medulla-panis is a species of poroid fungus in the family Polyporaceae. It is a plant pathogen that infects stone fruit trees. The species was first described by Nikolaus Joseph von Jacquin in 1778. Marinus Anton Donk transferred it to the genus Perenniporia in 1967.
