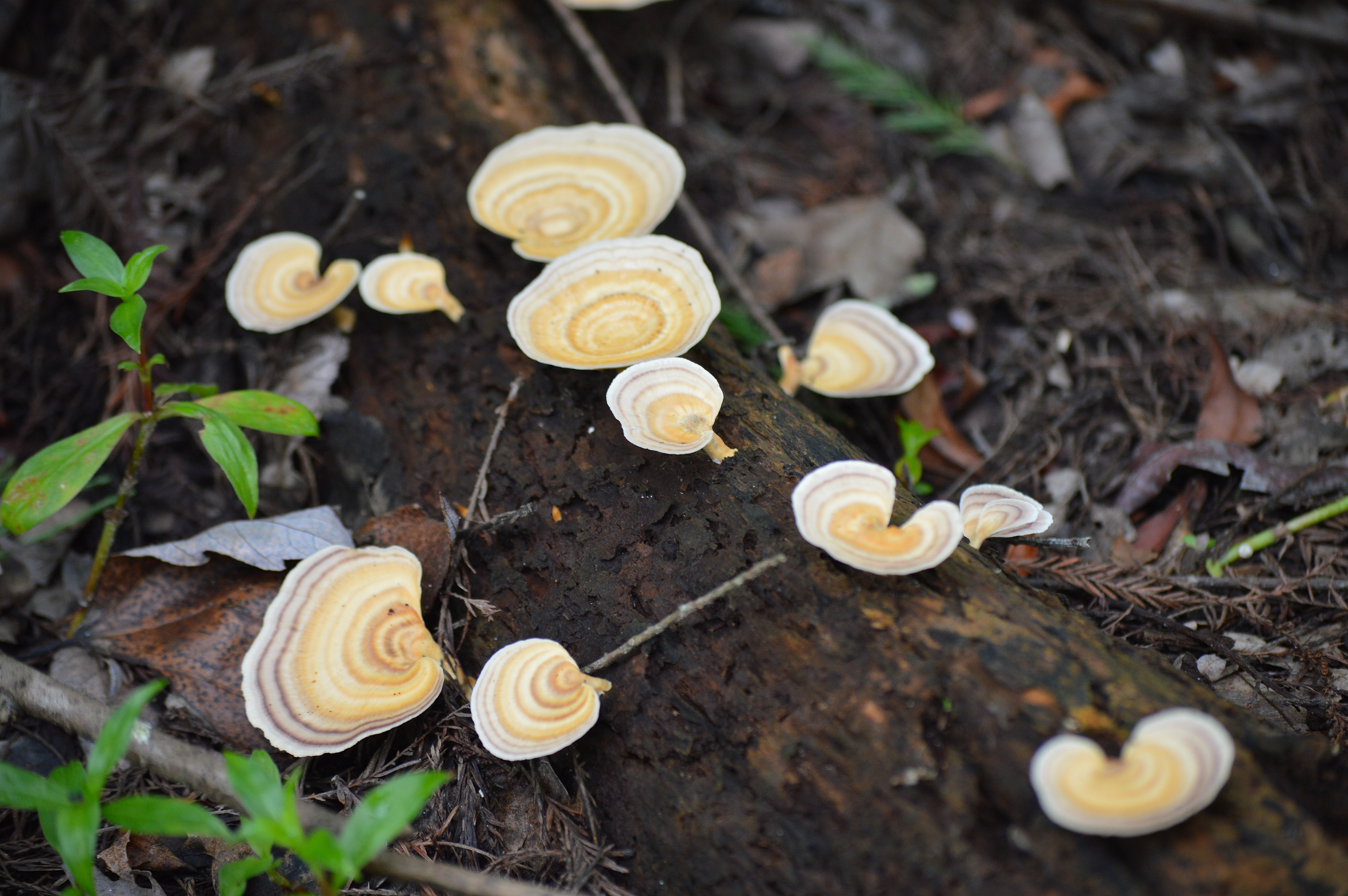

Scientific classification
- Kingdom: Fungi
- Division: Basidiomycota
- Class: Agaricomycetes
- Order: Polyporales
- Family: Polyporaceae
- Genus: Microporellus
- Species: M. obovatus

Binomial name
- Microporellus obovatus (Jungh.) Ryvarden (1972)

Synonyms
- Polyporus obovatus Jungh. (1838)

= Microporellus obovatus =

Species of fungus

Microporellus obovatus is a species of poroid fungus in the family Polyporaceae. It has been found in French Guiana, Guadeloupe, and various locales in Africa, India, and the United States.
