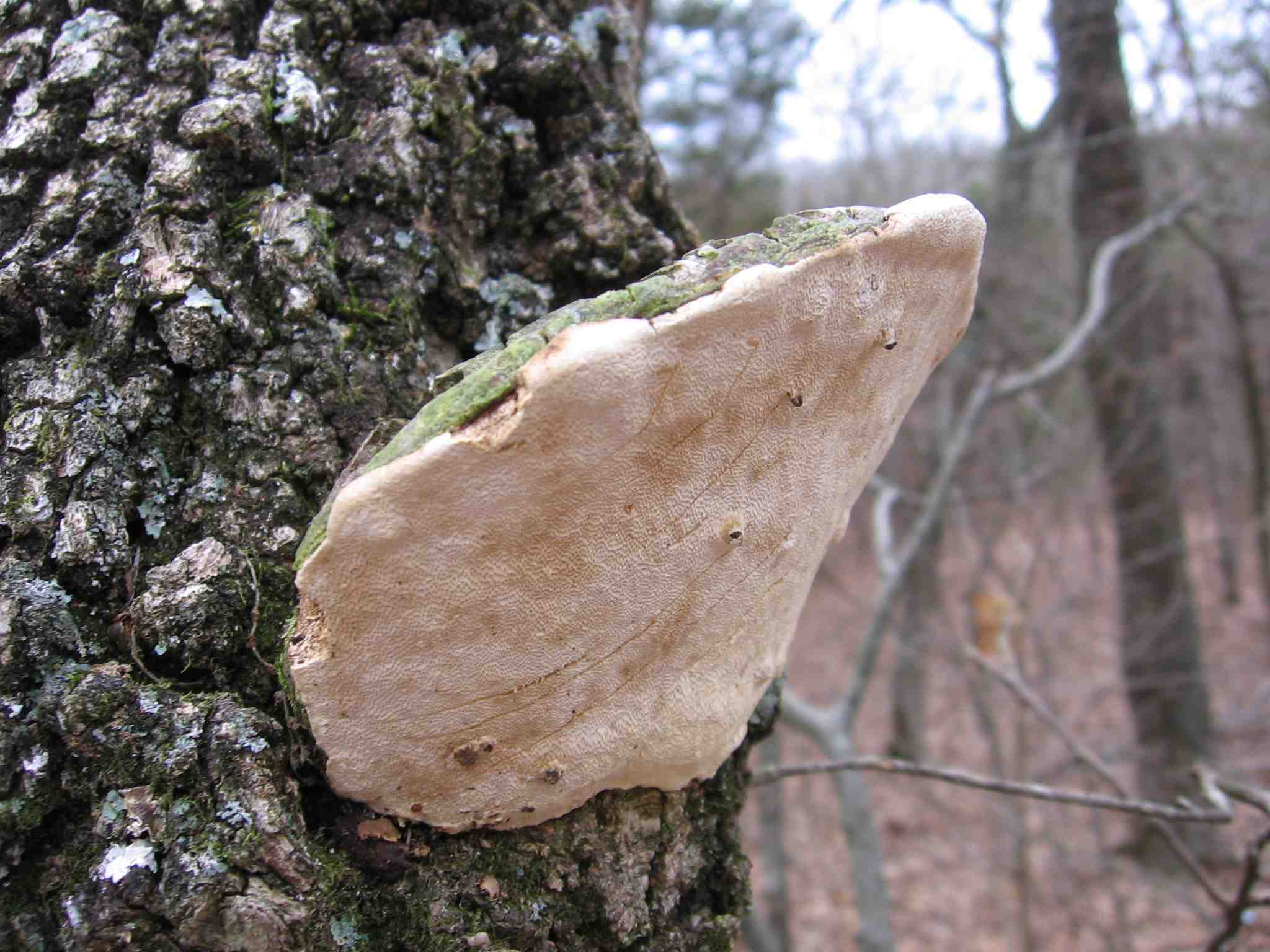

Scientific classification
- Domain: Eukaryota
- Kingdom: Fungi
- Division: Basidiomycota
- Class: Agaricomycetes
- Order: Polyporales
- Family: Polyporaceae
- Genus: Perenniporia
- Species: P. fraxinophila

Binomial name
- Perenniporia fraxinophila (Peck) Ryvarden (1972)

Synonyms
- Polyporus fraxinophilus Peck (1882); Fomes fraxinophilus (Peck) Sacc. (1888); Scindalma fraxinophilum (Peck) Kuntze (1898); Poria fraxinophila (Peck) J.E.Wright (1964)

= Perenniporia fraxinophila =

Species of fungus

Perenniporia fraxinophila is a species of fungus in the family Polyporaceae. It is a plant pathogen infecting ash trees.
