= Microporellus iguazuensis =

Scientific classification
- Kingdom: Fungi
- Division: Basidiomycota
- Class: Agaricomycetes
- Order: Polyporales
- Family: Polyporaceae
- Genus: Microporellus
- Species: M. iguazuensis

Binomial name
- Microporellus iguazuensis Rajchenb.

Species of fungus

Microporellus iguazuensis is a species of poroid fungus in the family Polyporaceae. Found in South America, it was described as a new species in 1987 by mycologist Mario Rajchenberg. The type was collected in Misiones Province, Argentina, in the Iguazú National Park. Characteristics of the fungus include the fruit body comprising a lateral stipe and multiple fan- or spoon-shaped caps. Microscopic characters include the dimitic hyphal system, relatively large basidia measuring 23–31 by 8–9 μm, and large ellipsoid to egg-shaped spores measuring 7–9 by 5–6 μm. The fungus was redescribed 23 years later after it was found in a polypore survey in the Atlantic rainforest of Rio Grande do Sul, southern Brazil. There it was growing on the ground amongst leaf litter, connected to roots of a living tree of Ocotea indecora.
