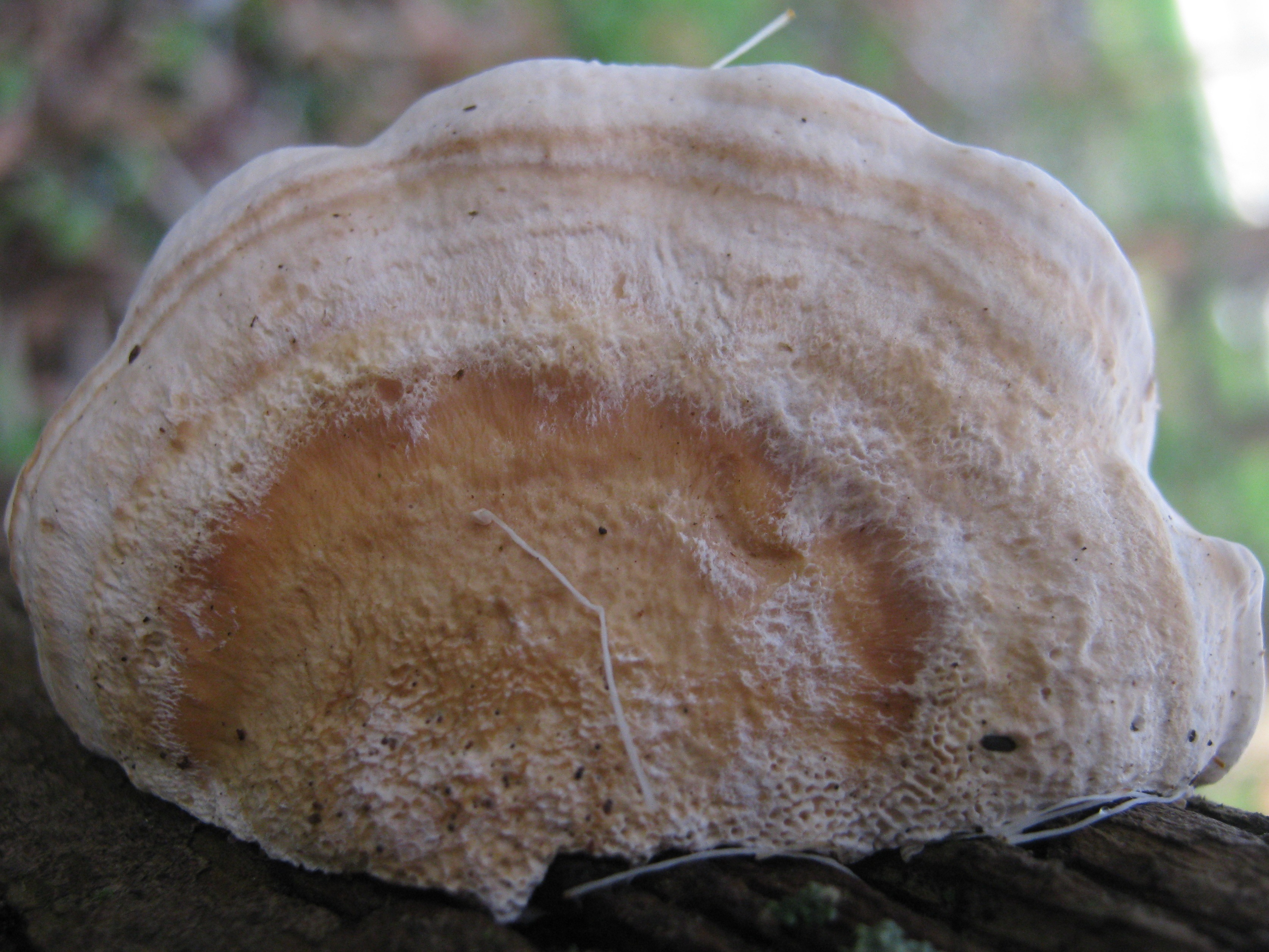
- Truncospora atlantica

Scientific classification
- Kingdom: Fungi
- Division: Basidiomycota
- Class: Agaricomycetes
- Order: Polyporales
- Family: Polyporaceae
- Genus: Truncospora; Pilát (1953)

Type species
- Polyporus ochroleucus Berk. (1845)

= Truncospora =

Genus of fungi

Truncospora is a genus of fungi in the family Polyporaceae.

== Taxonomy ==
The genus was originally proposed by Czech mycologist Albert Pilát in 1941, but this publication is invalid because a type species was not designated, contrary to the rules of botanical nomenclature. He published the genus validly in 1953 with two species: Truncospora oboensis, and the type, T. ochroleuca. Leif Ryvarden placed the genus in synonymy with Perenniporia in 1972, but molecular studies have shown that Truncospora is distinct genetically, and comprises part of the "core polyporoid clade", a grouping of fungi roughly equivalent to the family Polyporaceae.

The generic name Truncospora is derived from the Latin trunco ("I cut off") and the Ancient Greek σπορά ("spore").

== Description ==
Truncospora is characterized by relatively small, cap-forming fruit bodies that generally measure about 1.5–3 cm (0.6–1.2 in) long, 2.5–3.5 cm (1.0–1.4 in) wide, and 1–4 cm (0.4–1.6 in) thick. The skeletal hyphae range from non-dextrinoid to dextrinoid, and the spores are truncate and strongly dextrinoid.

== Species ==
The following species in are accepted in the genus Truncospora:

- Truncospora arizonica Spirin & Vlasák (2014) – USA
- Truncospora atlantica Spirin & Vlasák (2014) – Macaronesia; Iberian Peninsula
- Truncospora castanea (Corner) Zmitr. (2018)
- Truncospora detrita (Berk.) Decock (2011) – Africa
- Truncospora livida (Kalchbr.) Zmitr. (2018)
- Truncospora macrospora B.K.Cui & C.L.Zhao (2013) – China
- Truncospora mexicana Vlasák, Spirin & Kout (2014) – Mexico
- Truncospora oboensis Decock (2011) – São Tomé
- Truncospora ochroleuca (Berk.) Pilát (1953)
- Truncospora ornata Spirin & Bukharova (2014) – East Asia
- Truncospora tephropora Spirin & Bukharova (2014) – East Asia
- Truncospora tropicalis (Mont.) Zmitr. (2018)
- Truncospora truncatospora (Lloyd) S. Ito 1955
- Truncospora wisconsinensis C.L.Zhao & Pfister (2015) – USA
