= Perenniporia puerensis =

Scientific classification
- Domain: Eukaryota
- Kingdom: Fungi
- Division: Basidiomycota
- Class: Agaricomycetes
- Order: Polyporales
- Family: Polyporaceae
- Genus: Perenniporia
- Species: P. puerensis

Binomial name
- Perenniporia puerensis C.L.Zhao (2017)

Species of fungus

Perenniporia puerensis is a poroid crust fungus in the family Polyporaceae. Found in Yunnan, China, it was described as a new species in 2017. The crust-like fruit body of the fungus have a yellow to ochraceous pore surface, with 4 to 6 pores per millimetre. P. puerensis has a dimitic hyphal system with non-dextrinoid and cyanophilous skeletal hyphae that are encrusted with pale-yellow crystals. The spores are egg-shaped to somewhat spherical, thick-walled, non-dextrinoid, and cyanophilous, with dimensions of 4.3–5.5 by 3.7–4.7 μm.
