= Truncospora macrospora =

Scientific classification
- Domain: Eukaryota
- Kingdom: Fungi
- Division: Basidiomycota
- Class: Agaricomycetes
- Order: Polyporales
- Family: Polyporaceae
- Genus: Truncospora
- Species: T. macrospora

Binomial name
- Truncospora macrospora B.K.Cui & C.L.Zhao (2013)

Species of fungus

Truncospora macrospora is a species of poroid fungus in the family Polyporaceae. It was described as new to science in 2013 by Chinese mycologists Bao-Kai Cui and Chang-Lin Zhao. The fungus, found in southwest China, is distinguished by its annual growth habit, and the distinct dark brownish crust on its caps. The semicircular caps measure about 1.5–3 cm (0.6–1.2 in) long, 2.5–3.5 cm (1.0–1.4 in) wide, and 1–4 cm (0.4–1.6 in) thick. Microscopic characteristics include its relatively large spores (for which the fungus is named), measuring 16.5–19.5 by 8.0–9.5 μm, which have a strongly dextrinoid reaction. The type was collected in the Gaoligong Mountains (Baoshan, Yunnan) at an altitude of 2,400 metres (7,900 ft), where it was found growing on a fallen angiosperm branch.

Molecular phylogenetic analysis demonstrated a close relationship of T. macrospora to Truncospora ochroleuca. This latter species is distinguished by its cream to ochre cap, and smaller spores that measure 14.0–17.0 by 7.0–9.5 μm.
