= Perenniporiella =

Scientific classification
- Kingdom: Fungi
- Division: Basidiomycota
- Class: Agaricomycetes
- Order: Polyporales
- Family: Polyporaceae
- Genus: Perenniporiella; Decock & Ryvarden (2003)

Type species
- Perenniporiella neofulva (Lloyd) Decock & Ryvarden 2003

Species
- P. chaquenia P. micropora P. neofulva P. pendula P. tepeitensis

Genus of fungi

Perenniporiella is a genus of five species of polypore fungi in the family Polyporaceae. The genus was segregated from Perenniporia by Cony Decock and Leif Ryvarden in 2003 with P. neofulva as the type species.

== Species ==
- Perenniporiella chaquenia Robledo & Decock (2009) – Argentina
- Perenniporiella micropora (Ryvarden) Decock & Ryvarden (2003)
- Perenniporiella neofulva (Lloyd) Decock & Ryvarden (2003)
- Perenniporiella pendula Decock & Ryvarden (2003)
- Perenniporiella tepeitensis (Murrill) Decock & R.Valenz. (2010) – Mexico; Southeastern United States
