= Microporellus papuensis =

Scientific classification
- Kingdom: Fungi
- Division: Basidiomycota
- Class: Agaricomycetes
- Order: Polyporales
- Family: Polyporaceae
- Genus: Microporellus
- Species: M. papuensis

Binomial name
- Microporellus papuensis Decock

Species of fungus

Microporellus papuensis is a species of poroid fungus in the family Polyporaceae that was described as new in 2007. It was found growing from the ground (possibly on a buried root) in Madang, Papua New Guinea, and is only known to occur in the type locality.

== Description ==
The fungus is characterised by fruit bodies featuring a cap that is laterally attached to the stipe (pleuropodal), to shelf-like (applanate), to slightly convex in shape. The caps are whitish to greyish white; when fresh, there are some violet tints that disappear. Pores on the underside of the cap are medium-sized (relative to other Microporellus species), numbering 3–5 per millimetre. Microscopic characteristics include the presence of cystidia in the hymenium, and more or less spherical to tear-shaped spores that measure 6.5–7.5 by 5.0–6.0 μm.
