= Perenniporia meridionalis =

Scientific classification
- Domain: Eukaryota
- Kingdom: Fungi
- Division: Basidiomycota
- Class: Agaricomycetes
- Order: Polyporales
- Family: Polyporaceae
- Genus: Perenniporia
- Species: P. meridionalis

Binomial name
- Perenniporia meridionalis Decock & Stalpers (2006)

Species of fungus

Perenniporia meridionalis is a poroid crust fungus in the family Polyporaceae. It was described as a new species by Cony Decock and Joost Stalpers in 2006. The holotype specimen was collected in the Province of Nuoro in Italy, where it was found growing on dead wood of Quercus ilex. Distinguishing characteristics of this fungus include its relatively large pores (typically numbering 3 or 4 per millimetre), the hyaline vegetative hyphae that are yellowish to slightly dextrinoid in Melzer's reagent, and large spores measuring 6.0–7.7 by 4.5–6.2 μm. P. meridionalis occurs in central and southern Europe, where it is found in warmer forested areas, usually on dead oak wood. It has also been reported to occur in North America.
