= Perenniporia podocarpi =

Scientific classification
- Domain: Eukaryota
- Kingdom: Fungi
- Division: Basidiomycota
- Class: Agaricomycetes
- Order: Polyporales
- Family: Polyporaceae
- Genus: Perenniporia
- Species: P. podocarpi

Binomial name
- Perenniporia podocarpi P.K.Buchanan & Hood (1992)

Species of fungus

Perenniporia podocarpi is a species of resupinate (encrusting) polypore. It occurs widely but uncommonly on the New Zealand endemic podocarps Dacrydium cupressinum and Prumnopitys taxifolia. Basidiocarps are dimitic and grow up to 9 cm across, thick and cushion-like with a distinctive white or very pale cream spore surface with large pores. The basidiospores are extremely large for the genus, up to 27 μm in length.

As with other members of its genus, P. podocarpi causes a white rot in affected host plants.
