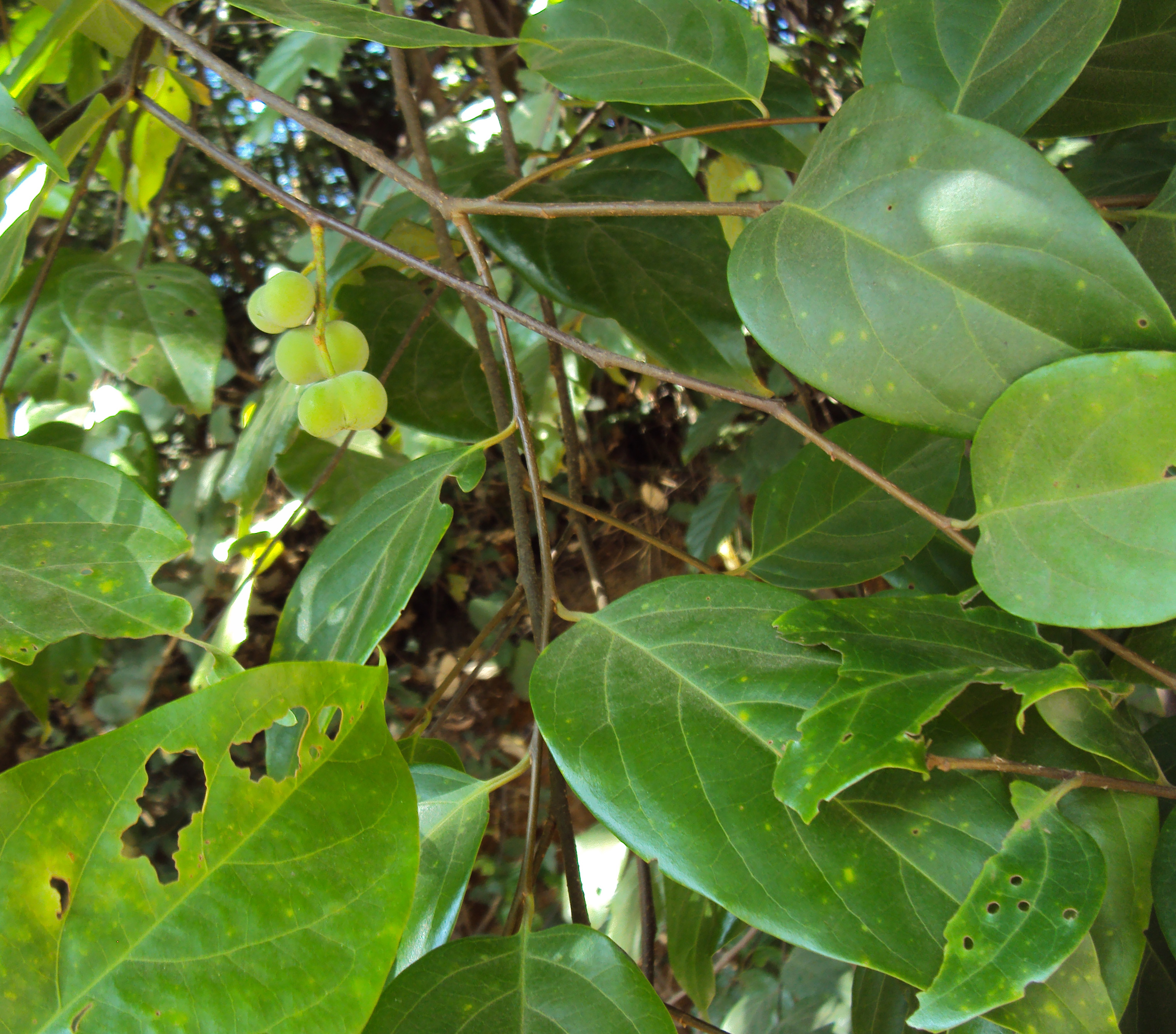

Conservation status
- Endangered (IUCN 2.3)

Scientific classification
- Kingdom: Plantae
- Clade: Tracheophytes
- Clade: Angiosperms
- Clade: Eudicots
- Clade: Rosids
- Order: Rosales
- Family: Rosaceae
- Genus: Prunus
- Species: P. ceylanica

Binomial name
- Prunus ceylanica (Wright) Miq.

Synonyms
- List: Polydontia ceylanica Wight; Pygeum acuminatum Colebr.; Pygeum ceylanicum Gaertn.; Pygeum cochinchinense J.E.Vidal; Pygeum gardneri Hook.f.; Pygeum glaberrimum Hook.f.; Pygeum parviflorum Craib; Pygeum parvifolium (Hook.f.) Koehne; Pygeum plagiocarpum Koehne; Pygeum sisparense Gamble; Pygeum tenuinerve Koehne; Pygeum wightianum Blume; Pygeum zeylanicum Gaertn.

= Prunus ceylanica =

Species of plant

Prunus ceylanica, the Ceylon cherry, is a species of plant in the family Rosaceae. It is a resident species to Sri Lanka and India.
