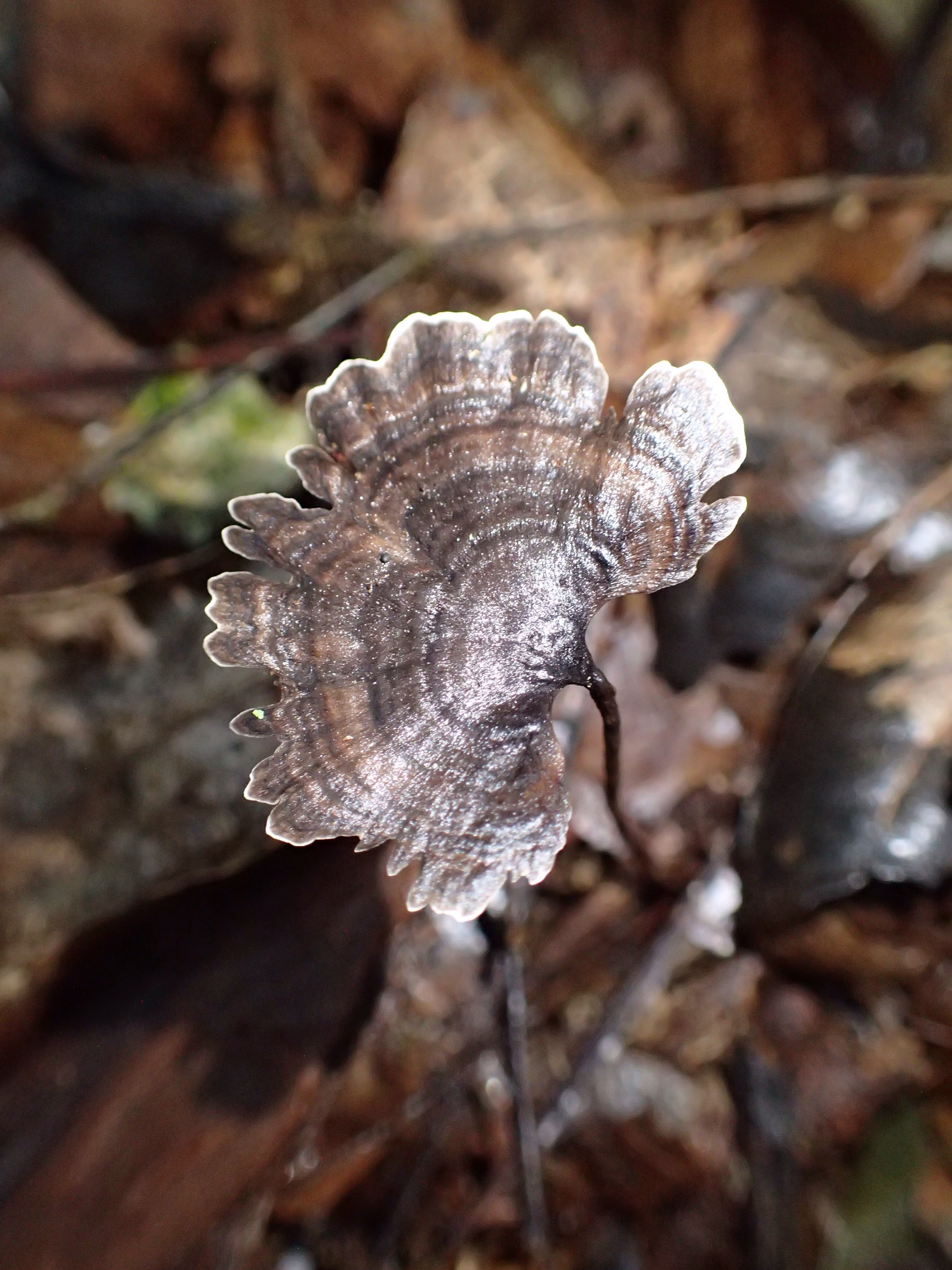

Scientific classification
- Domain: Eukaryota
- Kingdom: Fungi
- Division: Basidiomycota
- Class: Agaricomycetes
- Order: Polyporales
- Family: Polyporaceae
- Genus: Perenniporia
- Species: P. stipitata

Binomial name
- Perenniporia stipitata Ryvarden (1987)

Synonyms
- Microporellus subincarnatus Corner (1987)

= Perenniporia stipitata =

Species of fungus

Perenniporia stipitata is a species of poroid fungus in the family Polyporaceae. Found in Brazil, it was described as a new species in 1987 by Norwegian mycologist Leif Ryvarden.

== Taxonomy ==
The holotype of P. stipitata was collected in Caracaraí, a municipality in the state of Roraima. According to Cony Decock and Ryvarden, the fungus Microporellus subincarnatus, described by E. J. H. Corner from Brazilian collections in 1987, is the same species as P. stipitata.

== Description ==
The fungus features a stipe (up to 15 mm (0.6 in) long) that is laterally attached to its semicircular or fan-shaped cap. The presence of a stipe is unique in the genus Perenniporia. The cap surface is smooth, and ochre to pale brown in colour. The pores on the cap underside are tiny, measuring 8 to 10 per millimetre. It has a dimitic hyphal system with clamps in the generative hyphae; the skeletal hyphae are thick-walled and have a strong dextrinoid reaction with Melzer's reagent. Spores are more or less spherical to truncate, thick-walled, and measure 5–6 by 3–4 μm.
