= Bresadolia =

Scientific classification
- Kingdom: Fungi
- Division: Basidiomycota
- Class: Agaricomycetes
- Order: Polyporales
- Family: Polyporaceae
- Genus: Bresadolia; Speg.

Genus of fungi

Bresadolia is a genus of fungi in the family Polyporaceae. It contains six species.

== Species ==
Bresadolia contains the following species:

- Bresadolia craterella (Berk. & M.A. Curtis) Audet
- Bresadolia cuticulata (Y.C. Dai, Jing Si & Schigel) Audet
- Bresadolia hapalopus (H.J. Xue & L.W. Zhou) Audet
- Bresadolia mangifera Pat.
- Bresadolia paradoxa Speg.
- Bresadolia uda (Jungh.) Audet
