= Bresadolia uda =

Scientific classification
- Kingdom: Fungi
- Division: Basidiomycota
- Class: Agaricomycetes
- Order: Polyporales
- Family: Polyporaceae
- Genus: Bresadolia
- Species: B. udus

Binomial name
- Bresadolia udus (Jungh.) Zmitr. & Kovalenko

Synonyms
- Polyporus udus Jungh.; Polyporellus udus (Jungh.) P. Karst.; Tyromyces udus (Jungh.) G. Cunn.; Favolus udus (Jungh.) Zmitr. & Kovalenko; Polyporus maculatus Berk.; Polyporus squamosomaculatus Sacc.; Polyporus platyporus Berk.; Polyporus discoideus Berk. & M.A. Curtis; Polyporus glutinifer Berk. ex Cooke; Polyporus squamulosus Henn., in Engler, Pflanzenw; Polyporus fuscomaculatus Bres. & Pat., in Lloyd; Polyporus marbleae Murrill; Polyporus cornucopiae Lloyd; Favolus annamensis Pat.

Species of fungi

Bresadolia uda is a species of mushrooms. This mushroom likely represents a complex of similar species, some of which are awaiting description.

== Description ==
Hymenium is white porous with 3-4 pores per mm and tubes around 2 mm (0.08 in) deep, and dimitic white spores are 8-10 X 3-4 micrometers.

== Range ==

While it is described from Indonesia 200 years, it is only recently that the taxonomy has been tackled, revealing that there are likely to be several species involved. The original species, described by Junghuhn almost 200 years ago, seems to occur only in Indonesia, with specimens from China and Laos forming a sister clade. The specimens from Florida are even more distantly related to the specimens from the type locality in Indonesia than specimens from South America, also known as Breasadolia paradoxa, which Audet considers as a synonym of B. uda (likely incorrectly, based on DNA evidence).

== Habitat ==
It is found in tropical and subtropical forest habitats.

== Ecology ==
Bresadolia species are white rot saprophytic mushrooms. The mushroom is favored by insects, but is not known to be edible.

== Etymology ==
"Udus" means "wet" or "soaked" in Latin.

== Taxonomy ==
Taxonomic status of this mushroom from Florida remains unknown, with DNA evidence pointing towards it being a separate species from its relatives found at its type locality in Indonesia, China, and in South America.
