= Stypellopsis =

Scientific classification
- Domain: Eukaryota
- Kingdom: Fungi
- Division: Basidiomycota
- Class: Agaricomycetes
- Order: Auriculariales
- Genus: Stypellopsis; Spirin & Malysheva (2018)

Type species
- Stypellopsis hyperborea Spirin & Malysheva (2018)

Species
- Stypellopsis farlowii

Genus of fungi

Stypellopsis is a genus of fungi in the order Auriculariales. Basidiocarps (fruit bodies) are effused, gelatinous, crystalline or net-like and occur on fallen conifer wood. Species were formerly placed in Stypella or Protomerulius, but molecular research, based on cladistic analysis of DNA sequences, distinguishes Stypellopsis from these genera and from the morphologically similar genus Mycostilla. The type species occurs in northern Europe, Stypellopsis farlowii in North America.
