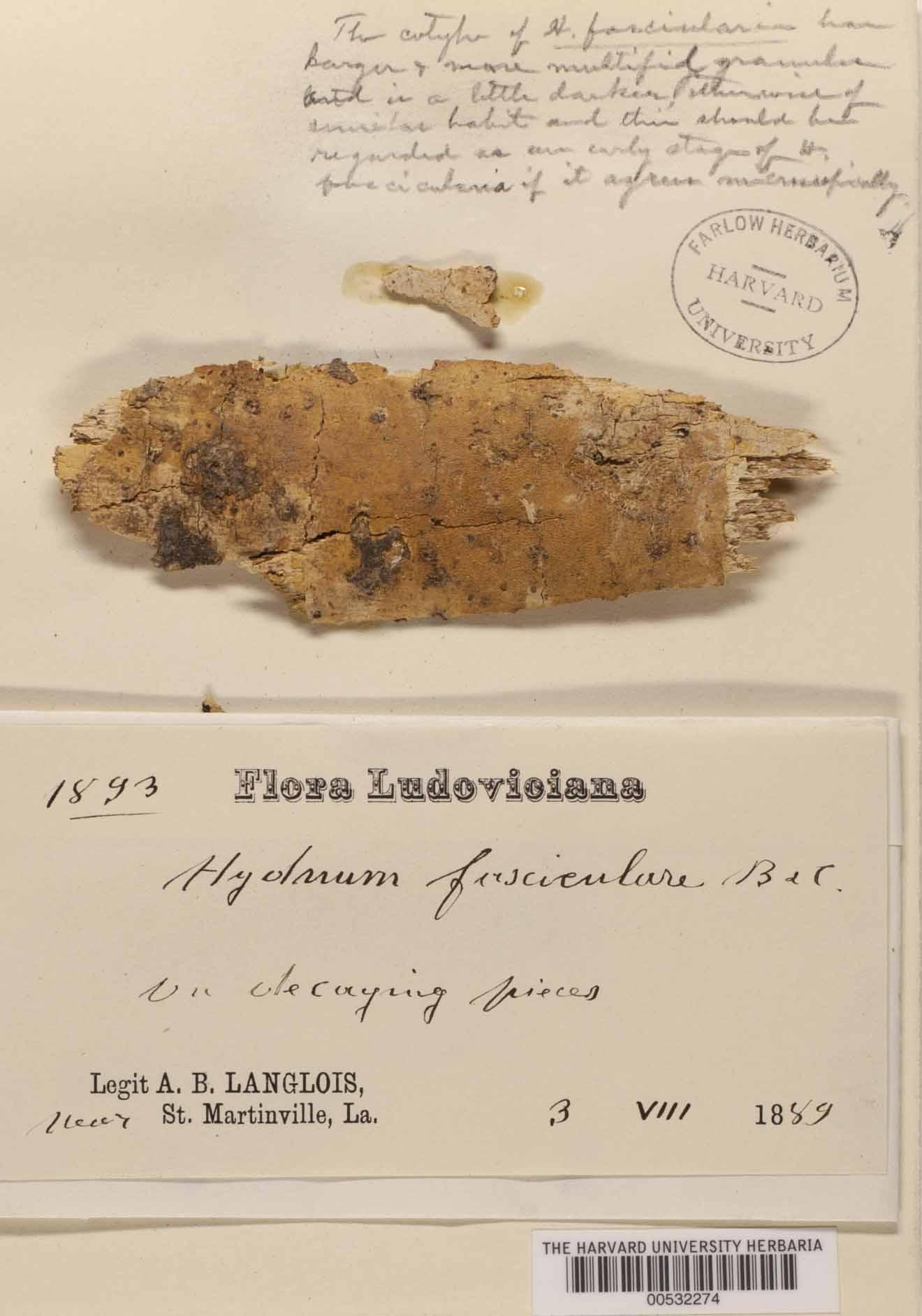

Scientific classification
- Domain: Eukaryota
- Kingdom: Fungi
- Division: Basidiomycota
- Class: Agaricomycetes
- Order: Auriculariales
- Family: Hyaloriaceae
- Genus: Protodontia
- Species: P. fascicularis

Binomial name
- Protodontia fascicularis Alb. & Schwein. and given the current name by Pilát ex Wojewoda

= Protodontia fascicularis =

Species of fungus

Protodontia fascicularis is a species of fungus in the order Auriculariales, first described by Johannes Baptista von Albertini & Lewis David de Schweinitz and given the current name by Albert Pilát ex Władysław Wojewoda.

== Distribution and habitat ==
It appears in Europe. It grows on dead wood of Abies alba and Pinus sylvestris.
