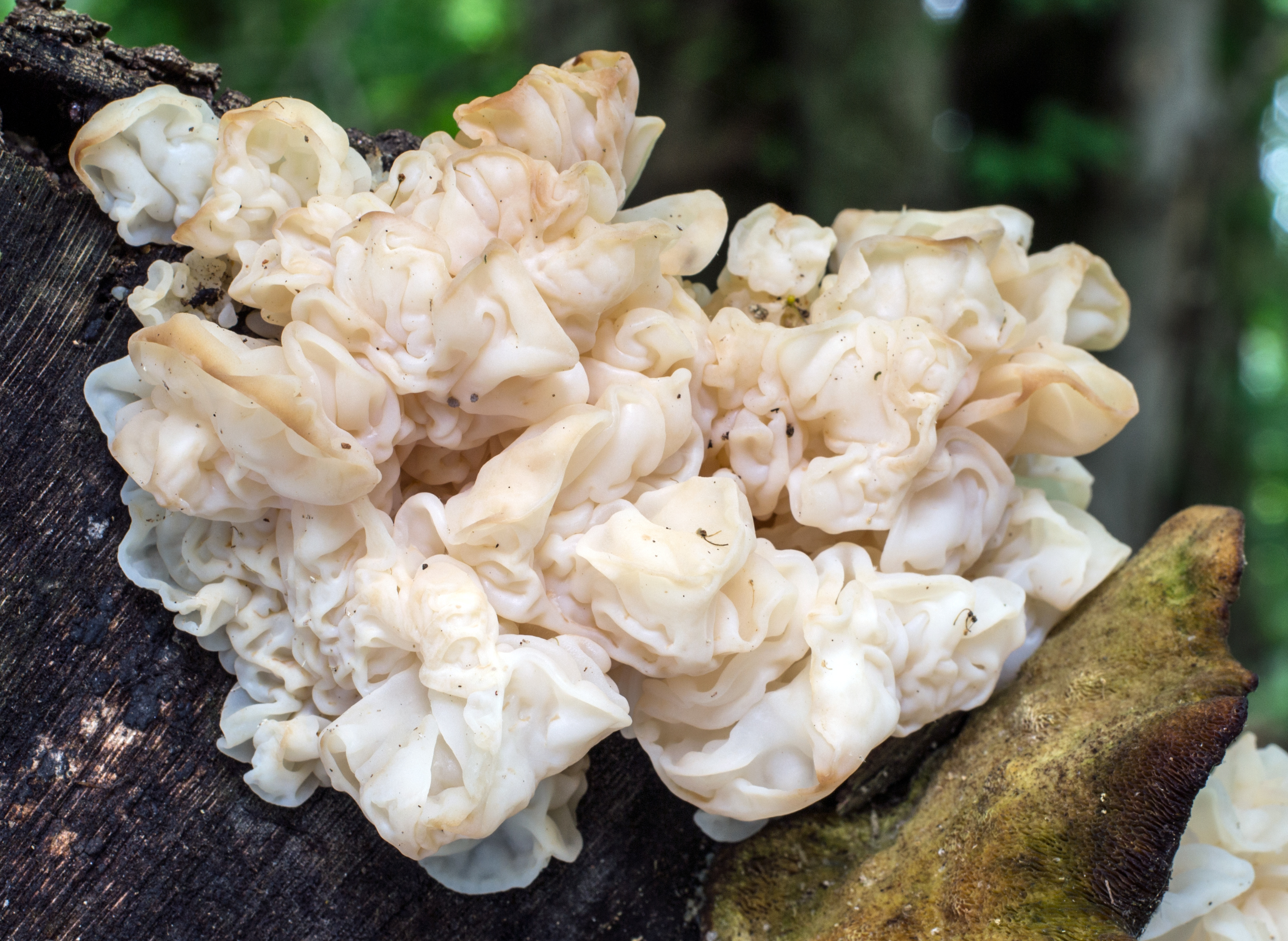
- Protohydnum album, Ohio, USA

Scientific classification
- Kingdom: Fungi
- Division: Basidiomycota
- Class: Agaricomycetes
- Order: Auriculariales
- Genus: Protohydnum; Möller (1895)

Type species
- Protohydnum cartilagineum Möller (1895)

Species
- P. album (Lloyd) Spirin; P. aureum (Lowy) Spirin; P. elasticum (Lowy) Spirin; P. elevatum V. Malysheva & Spirin; P. erumpens A. Savchenko & Spirin; P. galzinii (Bres.) Spirin & R.H. Nilsson; P. glabrum (Möller) Spirin; P. lactescens (Burt) Spirin & V. Malysheva; P. livescens (Bres.) Spirin & V. Malysheva; P. microperum (Kalchbr. & Cooke) Spirin; P. nudum Spirin & Ryvarden; P. ocellatum Alvarenga & K.H. Larss. P. pallidum Spirin & Ryvarden; P. pululahuanum (Pat.) Spirin; P. sucinum (Möller) Spirin & Alvarenga

Synonyms
- Sebacina subgen. Bourdotia Bres. (1908); Bourdotia (Bres.) Bres. & Torrend (1913); Ductifera Lloyd (1917); Gloeotromera Ervin (1956)

= Protohydnum =

Genus of fungi

Protohydnum is a genus of fungi in the order Auriculariales. Protohydnum cartilagineum, the type, occurs in Central and South America and produces effused, gelatinous basidiocarps (fruit bodies) on wood, wholly covered in small spines. Molecular research, based on cladistic analysis of DNA sequences, has shown that the genus is distinct, but that other similar-looking species previously referred to Protohydnum belong in the genera Hyalodon or Elmerina. More recent molecular research has shown that the genera Bourdotia and Ductifera, producing smooth, effused or lobed, gelatinous basidiocarps, are synonyms of Protohydnum.

== Taxonomy ==
The genus was first described from Brazil in 1895 by German mycologist Alfred Möller to accommodate Protohydnum cartilagineum, a species producing effused, cartilaginous-gelatinous basidiocarps on wood, wholly covered in small spines, and (microscopically) containing stalked, tremelloid (vertically septate) basidia. Several other species having similar features were later added to the genus.

Molecular research, based on cladistic analysis of DNA sequences, showed that Protohydnum cartilagineum represented a distinct genus in a clade that included species of Bourdotia and Ductifera. The European Protohydnum piceicola was found to be unrelated and moved to the new genus Hyalodon, whilst the south-east Asian Protohydnum sclerodontium was moved to the genus Elmerina. Subsequent research supported these results and indicated that Protohydnum, Bourdotia, and Ductifera represented a single genus, with Protohydnum the earliest name.

Bourdotia was originally published in 1908 by Italian mycologist Giacomo Bresadola as a subgenus of Sebacina having cystidia with oily contents (gloeocystidia). It was raised to the level of genus in 1913. Many additional effused species with gloeocystidia were subsequently described in Bourdotia until 1963, when Canadian mycologist E. Robena Luck-Allen transferred the majority into the genus Basidiodendron. Subsequently, only the type species Bourdotia galzinii, producing smooth, effused, gelatinous basidiocarps containing stalked basidia, was recognized within the genus.

Ductifera was originally published by American mycologist Curtis Gates Lloyd in 1917 to accommodate a South American species with lobed or foliose, gelatinous basidiocarps and distinct gloeocystidia. Additional species were later described within the genus.

== Description ==
Fruitbodies of Protohydnum species are formed on wood and are gelatinous, smooth (spiny in the type species), and variously effused, lobed, cerebriform (brain-like), or foliose. Microscopically, the hyphae have clamp connections, the basidia are tremelloid (vertically septate) and sometimes stalked. In some species, oil-filled gloeocystidia are present. Basidiospores are hyaline and ellipsoid to cylindrical.

== Distribution ==
Protohydnum album, with whitish, lobed to foliose fruit bodies, is a conspicuous species in eastern North America. It was formerly referred to P. pululahuanum, a similar-looking neotropical species. Most other Protohydnum species occur in Africa or the neotropics, but the effused P. galzinii and P. livescens are European, whilst P. elevatum is known from the Russian Far East.
