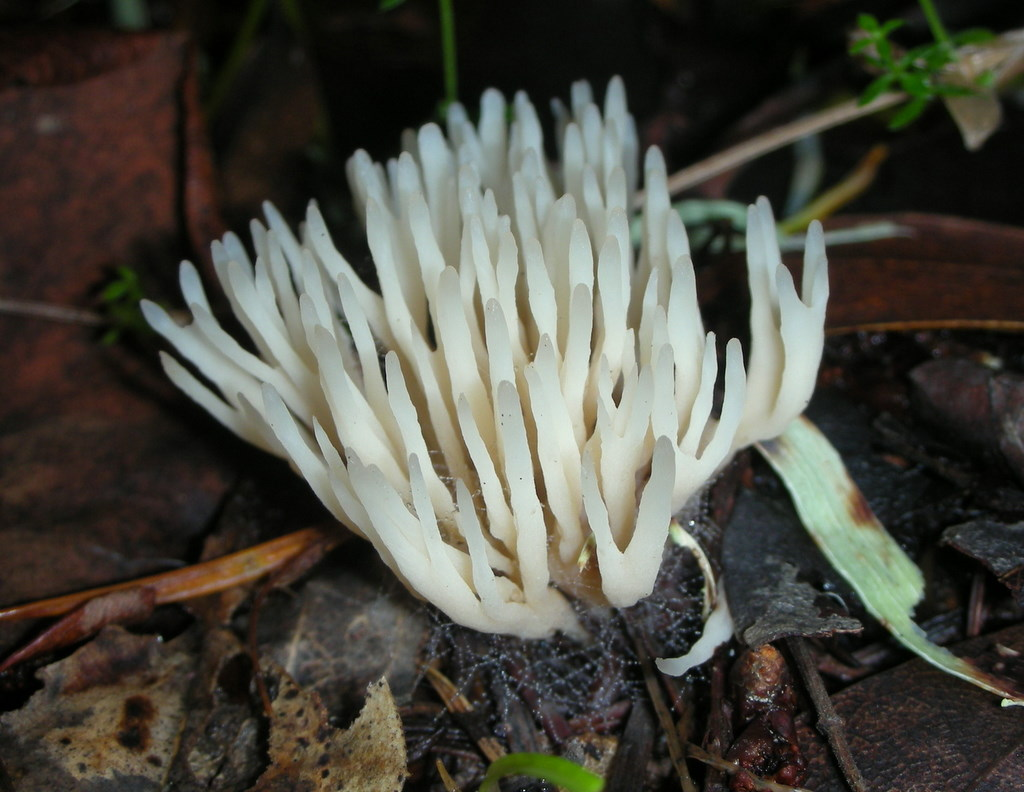
- Tremellodendropsis tuberosa

Scientific classification
- Kingdom: Fungi
- Division: Basidiomycota
- Class: Agaricomycetes
- Order: Tremellodendropsidales
- Family: Tremellodendropsidaceae
- Genus: Tremellodendropsis (Corner) D.A.Crawford (1954)

Type species
- Tremellodendropsis tuberosa (Grev.) D.A.Crawford (1954)

Synonyms
- Polyozus P.Karst. (1881) Pseudotremellodendron D.A.Reid (1956)

= Tremellodendropsis =

Genus of fungi

Tremellodendropsis is a genus of clavarioid fungi in the family Tremellodendropsidaceae. Species are distinguished microscopically by having partly septate basidia, a feature that led to their former placement within the Auriculariales or Tremellales. Molecular research, based on cladistic analysis of DNA sequences, has, however, shown that they form a distinct group within the Agaricomycetes.

== Species ==
- Tremellodendropsis clavulinoides
- Tremellodendropsis flagelliformis
- Tremellodendropsis pusio
- Tremellodendropsis semivestita
- Tremellodendropsis transpusio
- Tremellodendropsis tuberosa
