= Oliveonia =

Scientific classification
- Kingdom: Fungi
- Division: Basidiomycota
- Class: Agaricomycetes
- Order: Auriculariales
- Family: Oliveoniaceae
- Genus: Oliveonia; Donk (1958)

Type species
- Oliveonia fibrillosa (Burt) Donk (1958)

Species
- Oliveonia pauxilla Oliveonia subfibrillosa Oliveonia termitophila

Synonyms
- Heteromyces L.S. Olive (1957) (nom. illegit.); Oliveorhiza P. Roberts (1998)

Genus of fungi

Oliveonia is a genus of fungi in the order Auriculariales. Species form thin, effused, corticioid basidiocarps (fruit bodies) with microscopically prominent cystidia and aseptate basidia producing basidiospores that give rise to secondary spores. All species are believed to be saprotrophic, most growing on dead wood. The genus was originally published by American mycologist L.S. Olive in 1957 as Heteromyces, but this is an illegitimate later homonym of the lichen genus Heteromyces Müll.Arg. (1889). The genus was renamed Oliveonia by Dutch mycologist M.A. Donk in 1958.
