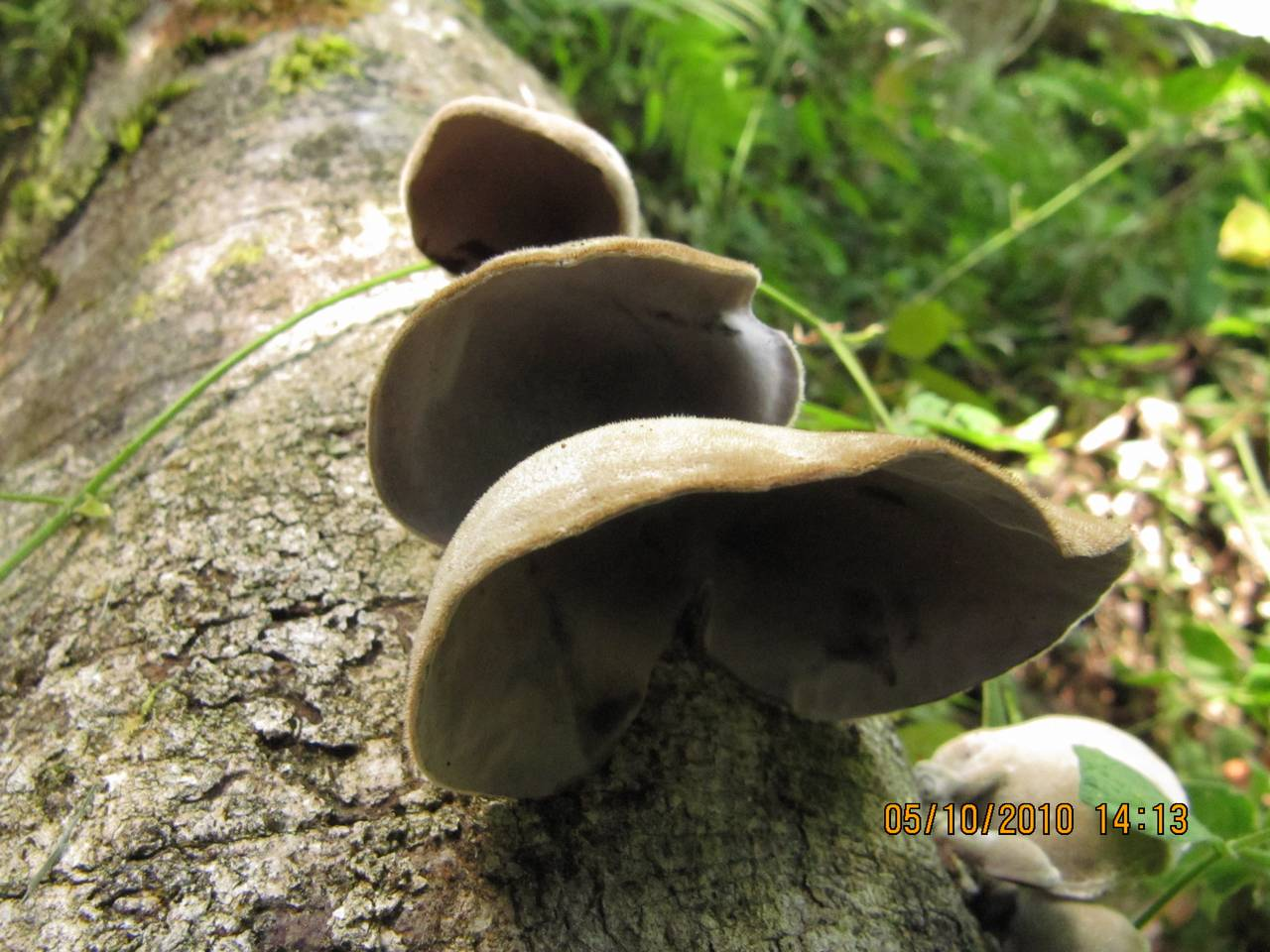
- On a dead broadleaf tree in Bolivia

Scientific classification
- Kingdom: Fungi
- Division: Basidiomycota
- Class: Agaricomycetes
- Order: Auriculariales
- Family: Auriculariaceae
- Genus: Auricularia
- Species: A. nigricans

Binomial name
- Auricularia nigricans (Fr.) Birkebak, Looney, & Sánchez-García (2013)

Synonyms
- Species synonymy: Peziza nigrescens Sw. (1788); Peziza nigricans Sw. (1806); Peziza nigricans Fr. (1822); Exidia hispidula Berk. (1839); Hirneola nigra Fr. (1848); Hirneola hispidula (Berk.) Berk. (1875); Auricula hispidula (Berk.) Kuntze (1881); Auricula nigra (Fr.) Kuntze (1881); Lachnea nigra (Fr.) Sacc. (1899); Auricularia nigra (Fr.) Earle. (1899); Auricularia nigrescens (Sw.) Farlow (1905); Auricularia hispidula (Berk.) Farlow (1905); Hirneola nigricans (Fr.) P.W. Graff (1917); Auricularia polytricha (Mont.) Sacc. (1885)) sensu auct. amer.

= Auricularia nigricans =

Species of fungus

Auricularia nigricans is a species of fungus in the family Auriculariaceae. Basidiocarps (fruitbodies} are gelatinous, ear-like, and grow on dead wood of broadleaf trees. It is found in southern and eastern Asia, North America, South America and the Caribbean.

The name Auricularia polytricha, when used by authors from the Americas, is a synonym of A. nigricans. When used by Asian authors, it likely refers instead to Auricularia cornea.

== Taxonomy ==
The species was first described in 1788 as Peziza nigrescens by the Swedish botanist Olof Swartz, based on a collection he made from Jamaica. In a later publication he changed the name to Peziza nigricans, which was accepted by the Swedish mycologist Elias Magnus Fries. For abstruse nomenclatural reasons, Fries's sanctioned name takes priority over Swartz's original name. In his monograph of Auricularia species, American mycologist Bernard Lowy rejected the name as being "doubtful" due to the habitat description being "ad terra", preferring to call the species Auricularia polytricha. Olof Swartz's original collection still exists, however, enabling the identity of his species to be confirmed. Molecular research, based on cladistic analysis of DNA sequences, has shown that Auricularia nigricans is distinct.

=== Auricularia polytricha ===
Auricularia polytricha was originally described as Exidia polytricha in 1834 in the work Voyage aux Indes-Orientales Botanique. Pt. 2. Cryptogamie. Although this record of the voyage was by Belanger, Montagne was the person who actually put it the form of a description, hence his author citation. The year 1834 was given in Montagne's later work (Syll. Crypt. XVIII. of 1856). There is a protologue in French in the Voyage, with the location "Sur le bois mort, dan las Gâtes orientales, prés de Gengy, presqu'ile de l'Inde" (On the dead wood, in the Eastern Ghats, near Gingee, Presque-isle of India). The combination Auricularia polytricha appeared in Saccardo's Syll. fung. VI (1885). This newer protologue gives a longer list of localities:

ad ligna in India orient (Belanger), in Java (Junghuan), in Ceylon, in Mexico, in ins. Cuba Amer. centr (C. Weight), in Brasilia, pr. Concepcion del Uruguay, Waima Novae Zelandiae, Maungaroa, Waitaki, Coromandel, Westland, Ohaeawai, Honkianga, Wellington (Teavers), in Hoew's et Chat's isl., ins. Tahiti.

on wood in East India [possibly also understood as a broader East Indies] (Belanger), in Java (Junghuan), in Ceylon, in Mexico, in the island of Cuba, Central America (C. Weight), in Brazil near Concepcion del Uruguay, Waima New Zealand, Maungaroa, Waitaki, Coromandel, Westland, Ohaeawai, Hokianga, Wellington (Teavers), Howe's and Chat's islands [possibly Lord Howe Island and Cat Island, The Bahamas?], island of Tahiti.

Lowy's 1952 monograph places the type locality of Auricularia polytricha in Jamaica instead of the Indian peninsula. It is unclear whether this is his change (possibly through conflating with the type locality of A. nigricans) or by an earlier author. The synonymization by Looney specifically specifies A. polytricha sensu auct. amer. (in the sense of American authors) without making a judgement on other uses of the name. Wu et al. (2021) made an error by disregarding the "sensu" specifier and stating that A. polytricha was originally described from Jamaica.

The East Asian sense of Auricularia polytricha started with Patouillard and Olivier (1907), according to Wu et al. (2021). In any case, there is no surviving collection from Belanger, so there is no way to determine whether the 1834 collection is A. nigricans, A. cornea, or a different species altogether.

Index Fungorum search lists the following infraspecific names under Auricularia polytricha:

Infraspecific names under Auricularia polytricha
Name	Authority	Locality
A. p. f. leucochroma	(Kobayasi) Kobayasi 1981	On dead trunk of Hibiscus glaber: Ogasawara-shoto, Japan
A. p. f. polytricha	(Mont.) Sacc. 1885	Same as original
A. p. f. tenuis	Kobayasi 1942	Micronesia
A. p. var. argentea	D.Z. Zhao & Chao J. Wang 1991 (nom. inval., Melbourne Art. 40.4)	On dried wood of Ulmus: Hebei, China
A. p. var. polytricha	(Mont.) Sacc. 1885	Same as original

Although Species Fungorum synonymize all listed above to A. nigricans, the two names described in East Asia (f. leucochroma and var. argentea) do not fall into the known range of A. nigricans. Indeed, Wu et al. (2021) found that the collection for A. p. var. argentea belongs in A. cornea.

== Description ==
Auricularia nigricans forms thin, rubbery-gelatinous fruit bodies that are ear-shaped and up to 60 mm (2.4 in) across and 4 mm (0.16 in) thick. The fruitbodies occur singly or in clusters. The upper surface is densely tomentose and ash-grey to yellowish brown. The spore-bearing underside is smooth and pinkish to brown.

=== Microscopic characters ===
The microscopic characters are typical of the genus Auricularia. The basidia are tubular, laterally septate, 50–75 × 3–6.5 μm. The spores are allantoid (sausage-shaped), 14.5–17 × 5–7 μm. The surface hairs are 650–1080 μm long.

=== Similar species ===
Auricularia cornea is similar but has much shorter surface hairs 200–400 μm long.

== Habitat and distribution ==
Auricularia nigricans is a wood-rotting species, typically found on dead attached or fallen wood of broadleaf trees. It is widely distributed in the Americas, from Louisiana and the Caribbean south to Argentina, but is not currently known elsewhere.
