= Psilochaete =

Scientific classification
- Domain: Eukaryota
- Kingdom: Fungi
- Division: Basidiomycota
- Class: Agaricomycetes
- Order: Auriculariales
- Family: incertae sedis
- Genus: Psilochaete; Spirin & V. Malysheva (2019)
- Species: P. multifora

Binomial name
- Psilochaete multifora Spirin & V. Malysheva (2019)

Genus of fungi

Psilochaete is a genus of fungi in the order Auriculariales. The type and only species, Psilochaete multifora, forms effused, gelatinous, basidiocarps (fruit bodies) that are reticulate (net-like). Molecular research, based on cladistic analysis of DNA sequences, indicates that Psilochaete is distinct from Protomerulius and similar genera. The species was originally described from Norway.
