= Protohydnum album =

- Protohydnum album Illinois, USA

Scientific classification
- Kingdom: Fungi
- Division: Basidiomycota
- Class: Agaricomycetes
- Order: Auriculariales
- Genus: Protohydnum
- Species: P. album

Binomial name
- Protohydnum album (Lloyd) Spirin (2025)

Synonyms
- Exidiopsis alba Lloyd (1913); Exidia alba (Lloyd) Burt (1921); Gloeotromera alba (Lloyd) Ervin (1956)

Species of fungus

Protohydnum album is a species of fungus in the order Auriculariales. Basidiocarps (fruit bodies) of this species are gelatinous, white, and lobed to foliaceous. The species occurs in eastern North America, where it was formerly known as Ductifera pululahuana.

== Taxonomy ==
The species was first described in 1913 by American mycologist Curtis Gates Lloyd. In 1956 Marion Ervin considered it sufficiently distinct from species of Exidiopsis and Exidia that she made it the type of her new genus Gloeotromera, which additionally included the South American G. pululahuana. Two years later, Kenneth Wells synonymized Gloeotromera with the earlier generic name Ductifera and also synonymized G. alba with the earlier G. pululahuana, creating the new name Ductifera pululahuana.

Molecular research, based on cladistic analysis of DNA sequences, has shown that Protohydnum and Ductifera represent a single genus, with Protohydnum the earliest name. Moreover, the North American Protohydnum album is shown to be distinct from the South American Protohydnum pululahuanum, as previously suggested by Ervin.

== Description ==
Fruit bodies of Protohydnum album are formed on wood and are gelatinous, smooth, white with brownish or ochraceous tints when old, pulvinate (cushion-shaped) at first becoming lobed, cerebriform (brain-like), or foliose. Microscopically, the hyphae have clamp connections, the basidia are tremelloid (vertically septate), not or only shortly stalked. Yellowish to brownish, oil-filled gloeocystidia are present. Basidiospores are hyaline, broadly cylindrical, 7.5-11 x 4-6 μm.

== Habitat and distribution ==
P. album is a conspicuous species in eastern North America and grows on dead wood of broadleaf trees.
