= Chha kh'nhei =

Cambodian stir fry dish

Cha kh'nhei
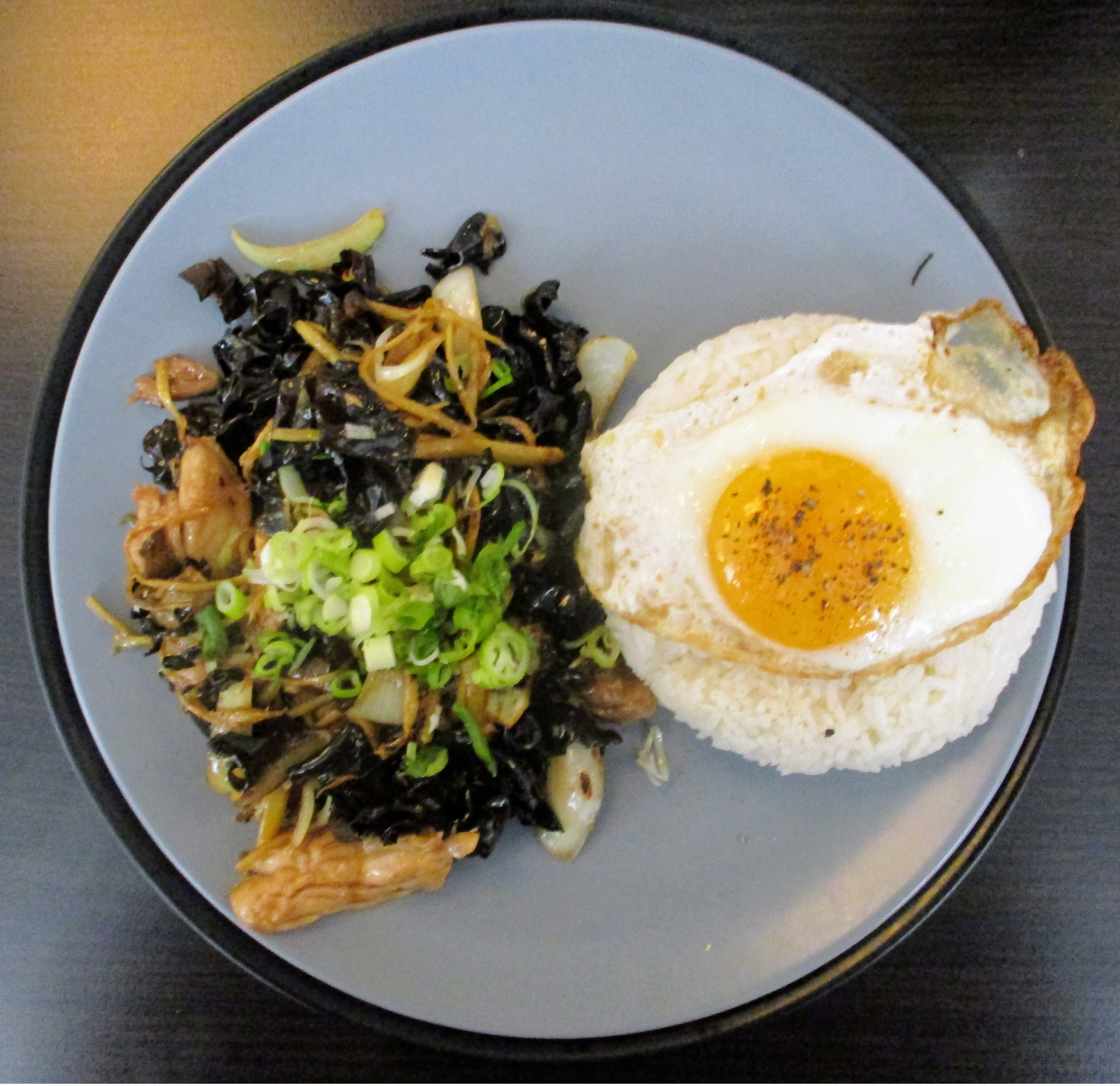
- Cha kh'nhei with stir-fried chicken, ginger, onion, woodear fungus, steamed rice and a fried egg
- Alternative names: chha kh'nhei, cha khnei, cha kney, cha k'nye
- Place of origin: Cambodia
- Associated cuisine: Cambodian cuisine
- Serving temperature: Hot
- Main ingredients: ginger root, meat, black pepper, garlic, soy sauce, palm sugar, holy basil leaves

Cha kh'nhei (Khmer: ឆាខ្ញី) is a Cambodian stir fry dish made from meat (usually chicken, eel, or frog) and ginger root flavoured with black pepper, garlic, soy sauce and palm sugar, and garnished with holy basil leaves. The ginger root is peeled, cut into matchstick size pieces, and cooked very briefly to retain its strong flavour and crunchy texture.

It is recommended to use firm young ginger, which doesn't have a tough and stringy texture. Garlic is cooked in a wok until golden before adding and stir-frying meat and finally adding sauce, sugar and julienned ginger.
