= Władysław Wojewoda =

Polish biologist and academic professor

- Born: 20 May 1932; Przemyśl, Poland
- Died: 3 November 2010 (aged 78); Kraków, Poland
- Resting place: Rakowicki Cemetery
- Education: Jagiellonian University
- Scientific career
- Fields: Botany; mycology
- Workplaces: Jagiellonian University, Polish Academy of Sciences
- Author abbrev. (botany): Wojewoda

Władysław Wojewoda (20 May 1932 – 3 November 2010) was a Polish biologist, academic professor, expert in botanics and mycology.

== Life ==
Wojewoda was born on 20 May 1932 in Przemyśl. He graduated from Biology and Earth Sciences Faculty of Jagiellonian University in Kraków and began work on Department of Plant Systematics and Geography. He earned a PhD with his work on “Macromycetes” of the Ojców National Park, in 1989 became a professor of nature sciences. In 1969–2003 he worked in W. Szafer Institute of Botany of the Polish Academy of Sciences. He's an author of over 300 papers, including monographies.

His most important achievements are:

- Monography of Auriculariales and Tremellales species in Poland,
- Checklist of Polish Larger Basidiomycetes,
- Red List of endangered macrofungi of Poland,
- Macrofungi of North Korea

He established a mushroom collection in Institute of Botany that grew to over 53,000 specimens. Its one of the most important fungi collections in Poland. He was a lecturer and thesis supervisor for MsC and PhD candidates. He studied fungi of Babia Góra, Gorce, na Spiš Magura, Ojcowski Park Narodowy, Tatra National Park, Niepołomice Forest and North Korea. He collaborated with Czechoslovak mycologists. Together with a fellow mycologist Barbara Gumińska they prepared an identification key of Polish macrofungi, his last work was "Laricifomes officinalis in the Gorce Mountains (S Poland)".

He was buried on Rakowicki Cemetery in Kraków.

== Important works ==
- 2003, Morphology of Some Rare and Threatened Polish Basidiomycota, Acta Mycologica, vol. 38, issue 1–2, Władysław Wojewoda
- Macrofungi of North Korea collected in 1982–1986 Polish Botanical Studies, Władysław Wojewoda, Halina Komorowska
- Invasive macrofungi (Ascomycota and Basidiomycota) in Poland, Dariusz Karasiński, Władysław Wojewoda
- Grzyby wielkoowocnikowe rezerwatu „Bór na Czerwonem” w Kotlinie Orawsko-Nowotarskiej (Karpaty Zachodnie), Halina Komorowska, Władysław Wojewoda
- Atlas of the Geographical Distribution of Fungi in Poland. 3., Władysław Wojewoda
- Atlas of the Geographical Distribution of Fungi in Poland. 2., Władysław Wojewoda
