= Ceratosebacina =

Scientific classification
- Domain: Eukaryota
- Kingdom: Fungi
- Division: Basidiomycota
- Class: Agaricomycetes
- Order: Auriculariales
- Family: incertae sedis
- Genus: Ceratosebacina; Roberts (1993)

Type species
- Ceratosebacina longispora (Hauerslev) P.Roberts (1993)

Species
- C. calospora C. longispora C. prolifera

Genus of fungi

Ceratosebacina is a genus of fungi in the order Auriculariales. The genus, which includes three species found in Europe, was circumscribed in 1993.
