= Heteroscypha =

Scientific classification
- Domain: Eukaryota
- Kingdom: Fungi
- Division: Basidiomycota
- Class: Agaricomycetes
- Order: Auriculariales
- Family: Heteroscyphaceae
- Genus: Heteroscypha; Oberw. & Agerer (1979)

Type species
- Heteroscypha applanata (P.H.B. Talbot) Oberw. & Agerer (1979)

Species
- Heteroscypha malmei

Genus of fungi

Heteroscypha is a genus of fungi in the order Auriculariales. Species form cup-shaped, cyphelloid basidiocarps (fruit bodies) with basidia that are wholly or partly septate. They are presumed to be saprotrophic, growing on dead wood. Originally described in the Tremellales, the genus was placed in its own family, the Heteroscyphaceae, by Jülich and included within the Auriculariales by Wells. Further research is required to determine its true disposition.
