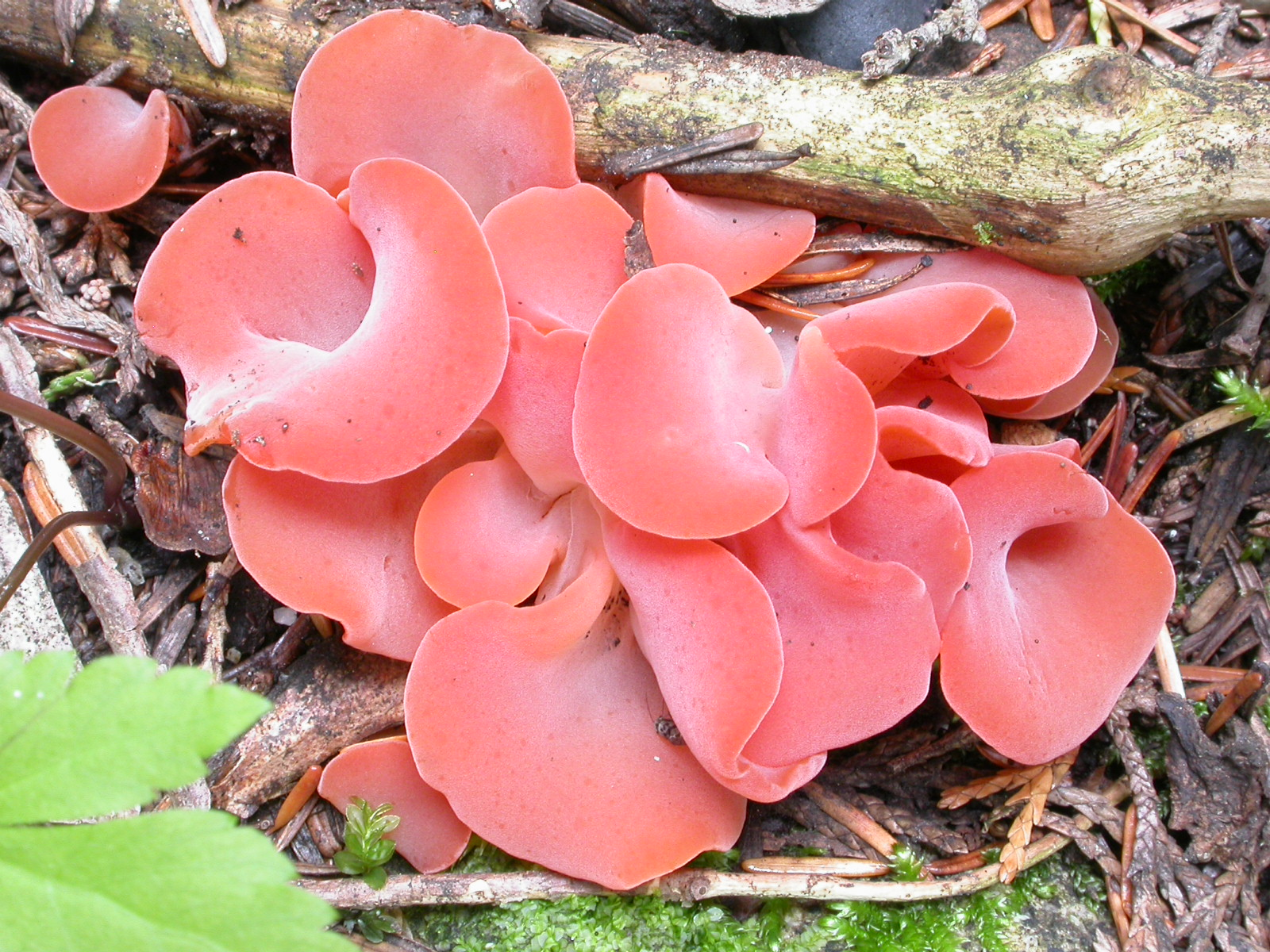

Conservation status
- Apparently Secure (NatureServe)

Scientific classification
- Kingdom: Fungi
- Division: Basidiomycota
- Class: Agaricomycetes
- Order: Auriculariales
- Genus: Guepinia; Fr.
- Species: G. helvelloides

Binomial name
- Guepinia helvelloides (DC.) Fr.

Synonyms
- Guepinia rufa (Jacq.) Beck; Gyrocephalus helvelloides (DC.) Keissl. Gyrocephalus rufus (Jacq.) Bref. Phlogiotis helvelloides (DC.) G.W. Martin; Phlogiotis rufa (Jacq.) Quél. Tremella helvelloides DC. Tremella rufa Jacq. Tremiscus helvelloides (DC.) Donk

= Guepinia =

Genus of fungi

Guepinia helvelloides
- Mycological characteristics
- Smooth hymenium
- Cap is depressed
- Hymenium attachment is irregular or not applicable
- Stipe is bare
- Spore print is white
- Ecology is saprotrophic
- Edibility is edible

Guepinia is a genus of fungus in the Auriculariales order. It is a monotypic genus, containing the single species Guepinia helvelloides, commonly known as the apricot jelly or salmon salad. The fungus produces salmon-pink, ear-shaped, gelatinous fruit bodies that grow solitarily or in small tufted groups on soil, usually associated with buried rotting wood. The fruit bodies are up to 10 cm (4 in) tall and up to 17 cm (6 3/4 in) wide; the stalks are not well-differentiated from the cap. It has a white spore deposit, and the oblong to ellipsoid spores measure 9–11 by 5–6 micrometers.

The fungus is widely distributed in the Northern Hemisphere, and has also been collected from South America. Although rubbery, the flesh is edible; it may be eaten raw with salads, pickled, or candied.

== Taxonomy ==
The species was first described and illustrated as Tremella rufa by Nicolaus Joseph von Jacquin in 1778. Elias Magnus Fries later (1828) called it Guepinia helvelloides in his Elenchus Fungorum, based on Augustin Pyramus de Candolle's Tremella helvelloides, both being names he sanctioned. This has made Tremella rufa and all names based on it unavailable for use, as they are conserved. Later, Lucien Quélet erected a separate monotypic genus Phlogiotis for Jacquin's species, whereas Julius Oscar Brefeld placed it (as Gyrocephalus rufa) in Persoon's small genus Gyrocephalus (rejected name for Gyromitra). The proper name for the fungus was debated for some time, as the name Guepinia is a homonym (pointed out by Fries in 1828), because it had been used by Toussaint Bastard in 1812 for a genus of flowering plants in the Cruciferae family. To further complicate matters, the generic name Teesdalia, originally considered to have priority over the name Guepinia for the plant genus, was later determined to have been validly published after Guepinia, rendering Teesdalia an illegitimate name. In 1982, changes in the International Code for Botanical Nomenclature gave protected status to all names adopted by Fries in the Elenchus Fungorum, and established Guepinia as the correct genus name.

Guepinia is variously classified in the Auriculariales order, with uncertain familial position (incertae sedis), or as part of the Exidiaceae family.

The genus is named after French mycologist Jean-Pierre Guépin (1779–1858). The mushroom is commonly known as the "red jelly fungus", or "apricot jelly".

== Description ==
The fruit bodies of Guepinia helvelloides grow singly or in small clumps. Although they can appear to be growing in the soil, their mycelium lives in buried wood. They are 4–10 cm (1 1/2–4 in) tall and 1–17 cm (1/2–6 3/4 in) wide, spoon- or tongue-shaped, and twisted like a cornet or horn so that they look like a slender funnel, cut out on one side and often with a wavy margin. The fruit bodies are flexible, 2–3.5 mm (1/16–1/8 in) thick, and smooth on the outer side which they are usually attenuated on the underside into a cylindrical or depressed stem that is up to 5 cm (2 in) high and about 1.5 cm (1/2 in) thick. The stem is normally covered with a white tomentum at the base. The upper side (inside) of the fruit body is usually quite sterile or with a few isolated basidia and is slightly verrucose as a result of the densely crowded protruding ends of the hyphae. The sterile and fertile surfaces of the fruit body are almost the same color, transparent reddish-orange to flesh pink or flesh orange, at other times more purplish-red. The fruit bodies usually develop a slightly brownish tinge when they are old. The underside is usually slightly more vividly colored than the upper side. The flesh is gelatinous, softly so in the upper part of the fruit body and with a more cartilage-like consistency in the stem. It has a nondescript odor, and a watery, insignificant taste.

The hymenium is developed on the under (outer) side of the fruit body. The basidia (spore-bearing cells) consist of a globular part (the hypobasidia) to which inflated or elongated epibasidia are attached. In Guepinia, the hypobasidia are egg-shaped to ellipsoid, measuring 12–16 by 9–12 μm, and attached to fibril-like epibasidia that are 20–45 by 3–4 μm. The spore deposit is white, while the spores are 9–11 by 5–6 μm, hyaline (translucent), cylindrical to elongated ellipsoid in shape, and have a large oil drop.

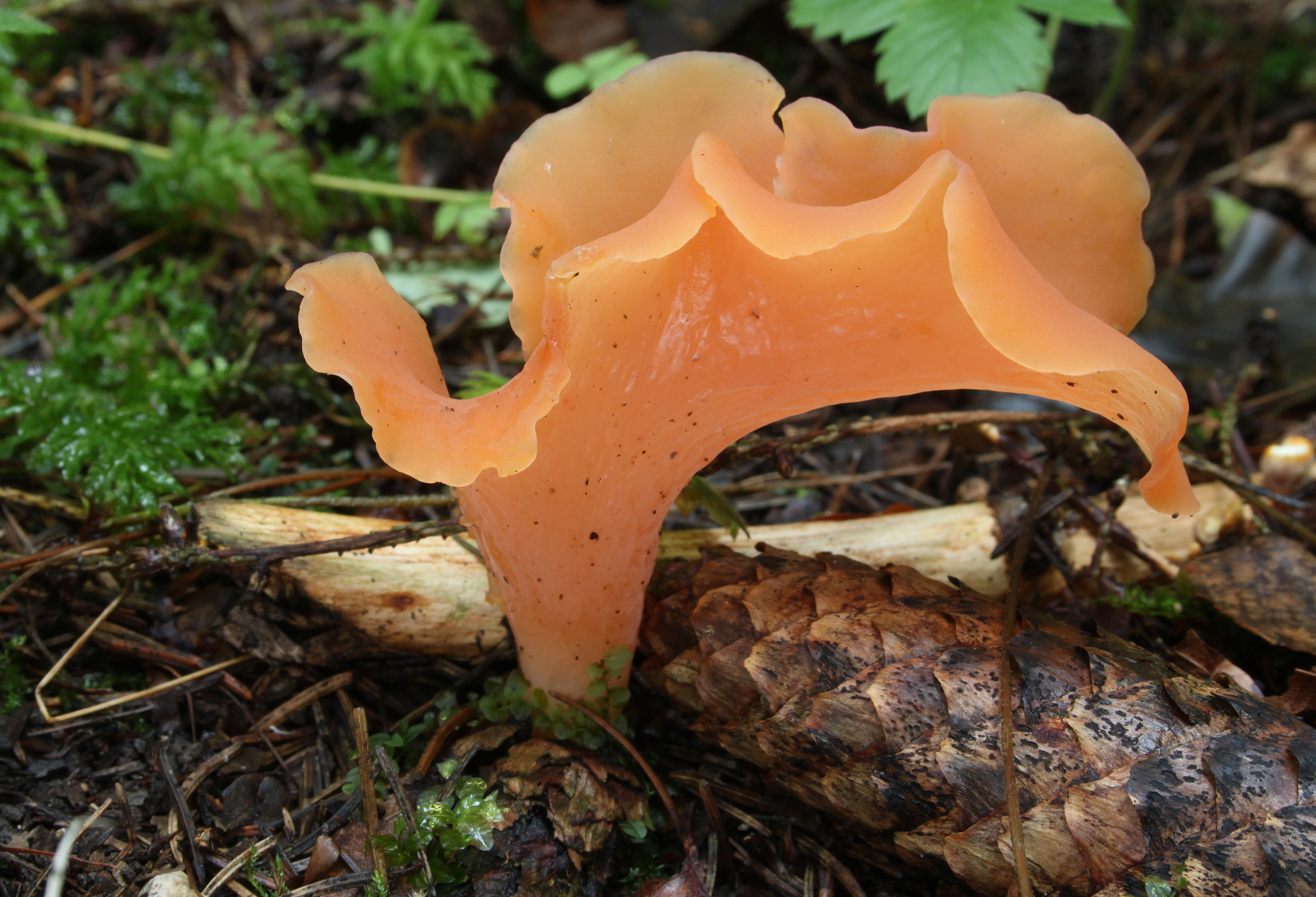
German specimen

=== Similar species ===
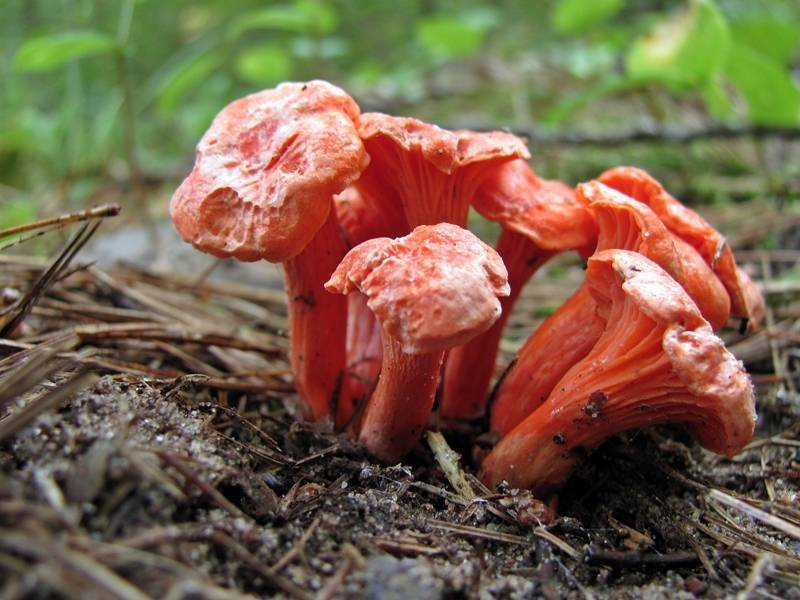
The red chanterelle (Cantharellus cinnabarinus) has ridges on the undersurface.

Guepinia helvelloides has a rather unusual appearance, and is not likely to be mistaken for other fungi. However, the red chanterelle species Cantharellus cinnabarinus is superficially similar; unlike G. helvelloides, however, it does not have a rubbery and gelatinous texture, and its undersurface is wrinkled, not smooth. Dacryopinax spathularia produces small fruit bodies, and Spathulariopsis velutipes has a white head.

== Habitat and distribution ==
Guepinia helvelloides is saprobic, deriving nutrients by breaking down organic matter. The fruit bodies of G. helveloides typically grow solitarily or in small tufts on soil, usually in association with buried rotting wood. Although the fruit bodies sometimes appear in the spring, they are more commonly found in the summer and autumn months. In North America, it is associated with coniferous forests. It is also found throughout temperate North America, from Canada to Mexico. Europe, Iran, and Turkey. It is also known from Brazil and Puerto Rico. The fungus has also been collected from the Qinling region of China.

== Uses ==
Guepinia helvelloides is an edible, but bland, fungus. Older specimens are usually tough and indigestible. It can be used raw in salads, for pickling in vinegar and also for preserving in sugar like candied fruit. One source reports using it to prepare a wine by fermenting with wine yeast.
