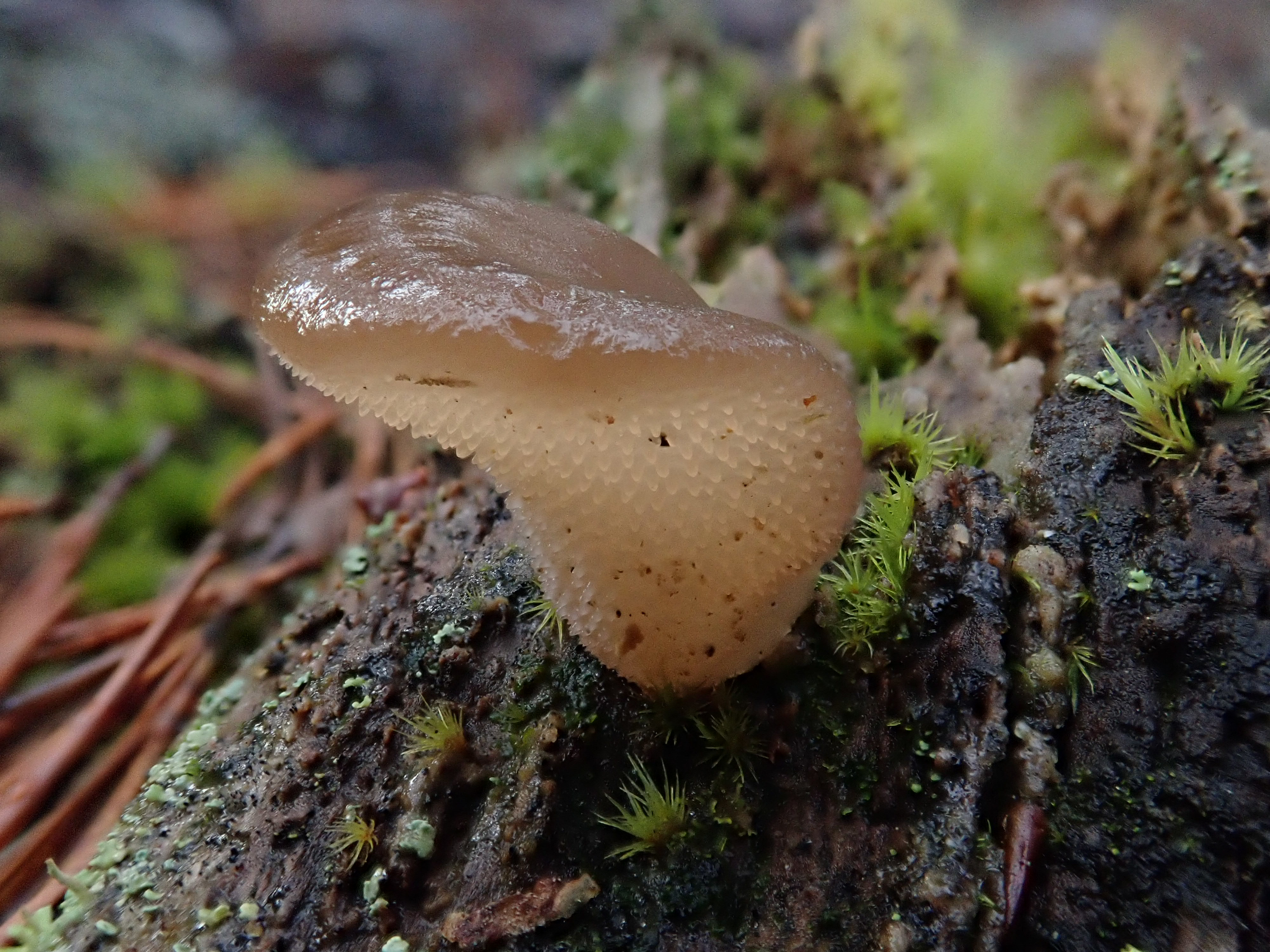
- Pseudohydnum gelatinosum, Abernethy Forest, Scotland

Scientific classification
- Kingdom: Fungi
- Division: Basidiomycota
- Class: Agaricomycetes
- Order: Auriculariales
- Family: incertae sedis
- Genus: Pseudohydnum
- Species: P. gelatinosum

Binomial name
- Pseudohydnum gelatinosum (Scop.) P.Karst. (1868)

Synonyms
- Hydnum gelatinosum Scop. (1772)

= Pseudohydnum gelatinosum =

Species of fungus

Pseudohydnum gelatinosum
- Mycological characteristics
- Teeth on hymenium
- No distinct cap
- Hymenium attachment is irregular or not applicable
- Lacks a stipe
- Ecology is saprotrophic
- Edibility is edible

Pseudohydnum gelatinosum, commonly known as the toothed jelly fungus, cat's tongue, or jelly tooth, is a species of fungus in the order Auriculariales. Its common names refer to its gelatinous consistency and hydnoid (toothed) undersurface. Found in Eurasia, the mushroom is edible.

== Description ==
The gelatinous fruit bodies are whitish to light grayish or tan, 2–7 centimetres (3/4–2 3/4 inches) wide and tall, with teeth up to 3 millimetres (1/8 in) long. The spore print is white. It has little to no flavour.

== Taxonomy ==
A subspecies, Pseudohydnum gelatinosum ssp. pusillum, is found in North America. It is the only toothed jelly fungus known in the region.

== Distribution and habitat ==
The species was thought to be cosmopolitan, but recent DNA evidence suggests that it is confined to Europe and northern Asia, with superficially similar (but distinct) taxa elsewhere. P. gelatinosum grows on dead conifer wood.

The North American species can be found near both coasts, between November– February on the west and July–September in other places. Western specimens usually have a distinct vertical stalk compared to those in the east.

== Uses ==
The jelly tooth is edible, perhaps even raw, although can benefit from marination. It is consumed as a wild food in parts of Bulgaria, Russia, and Siberia.
