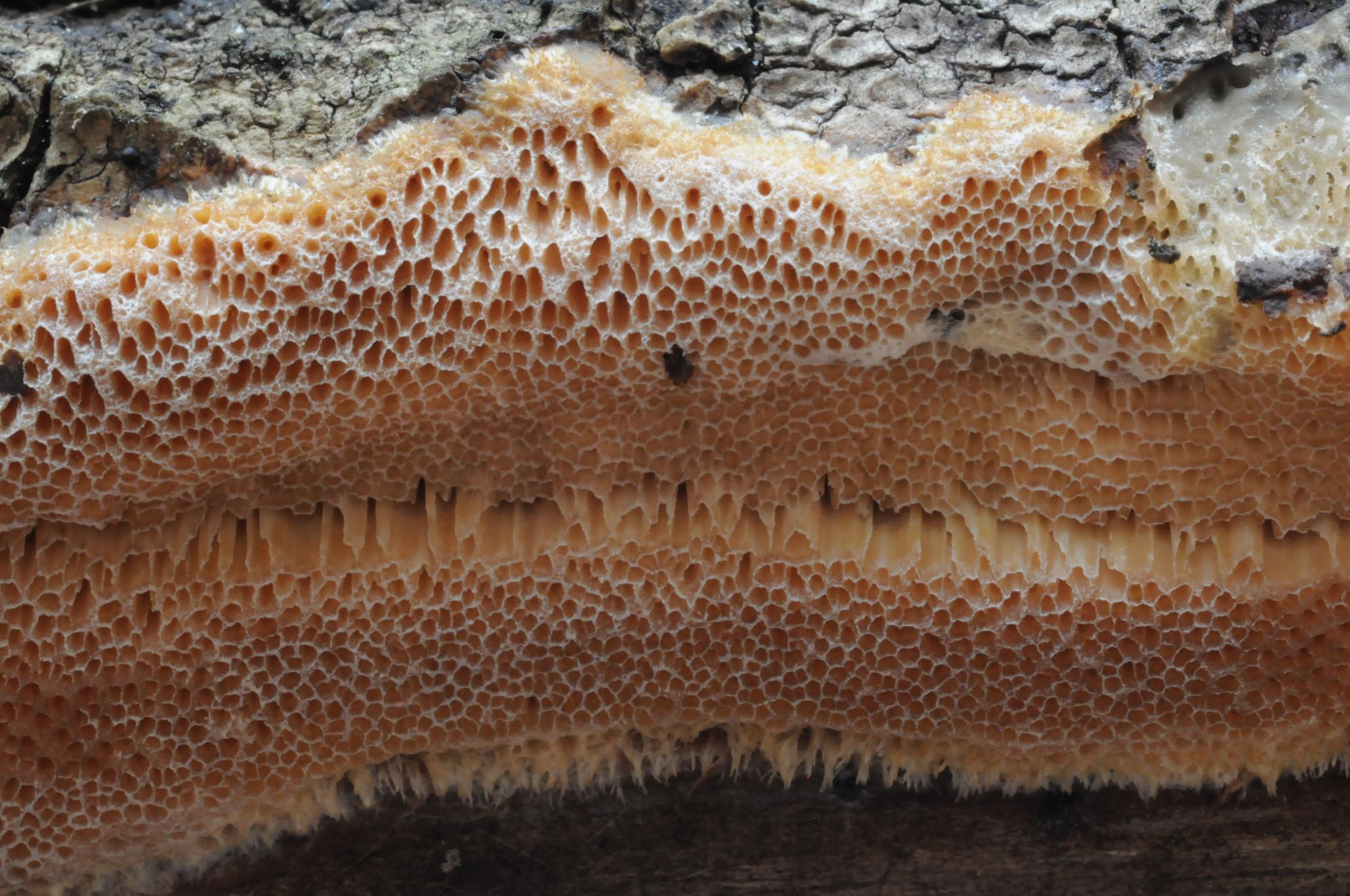

Scientific classification
- Domain: Eukaryota
- Kingdom: Fungi
- Division: Basidiomycota
- Class: Agaricomycetes
- Order: Auriculariales
- Family: Auriculariaceae
- Genus: Aporpium; Bondartsev & Singer (1944)

Type species
- Aporpium canescens (P. Karst.) Bondartsev & Singer (1944)

Species
- Aporpium caryae Aporpium macroporum

= Aporpium =

Genus of fungi

Aporpium is a genus of fungi in the order Auriculariales. Basidiocarps (fruit bodies) are formed on dead wood and have a poroid hymenium. Species were often formerly referred to the genera Elmerina or Protomerulius, but molecular research, based on cladistic analysis of DNA sequences, has shown that Aporpium is a distinct, mainly north temperate genus.
