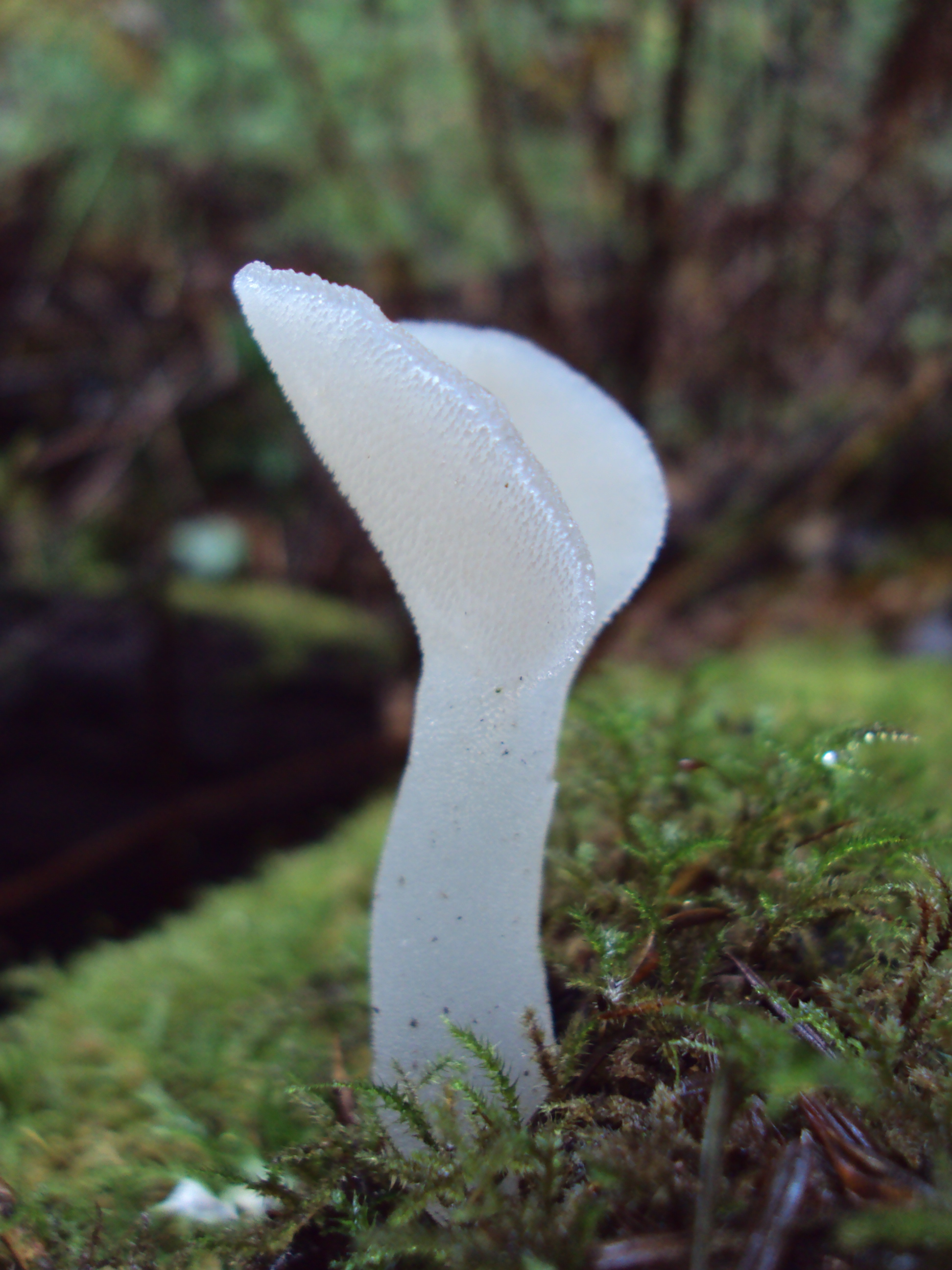
- Pseudohydnum species, USA

Scientific classification
- Kingdom: Fungi
- Division: Basidiomycota
- Class: Agaricomycetes
- Order: Auriculariales
- Family: incertae sedis
- Genus: Pseudohydnum; P. Karst. (1868)

Type species
- Pseudohydnum gelatinosum (Scop.) P. Karst. (1868)

Species
- Pseudohydnum alienum Pseudohydnum brunneiceps Pseudohydnum cystidiatum Pseudohydnum fusiformis Pseudohydnum gelatinosum Pseudohydnum himalayanum Pseudohydnum meridianum Pseudohydnum omnipavum Pseudohydnum orbiculare Pseudohydnum placibile Pseudohydnum rhododendri Pseudohydnum sinogelatinosum Pseudohydnum tasmanicum Pseudohydnum totarae Pseudohydnum umbrosum

= Pseudohydnum =

Genus of fungi

Pseudohydnum is a genus of fungi in the order Auriculariales. Basidiocarps (fruit bodies) are typically bracket-like and gelatinous, with or without a stipe, with a hydnoid (toothed) undersurface. The genus is widely distributed in both the northern and southern hemisphere, with over a dozen species currently described and others awaiting description.

== Taxonomy ==
The genus, first described by Finnish mycologist Petter Adolf Karsten in 1868, has not yet been classified with certainty into a family. Molecular research, based on cladistic analysis of DNA sequences, has confirmed Pseudohydnum as a natural (monophyletic) taxon.
