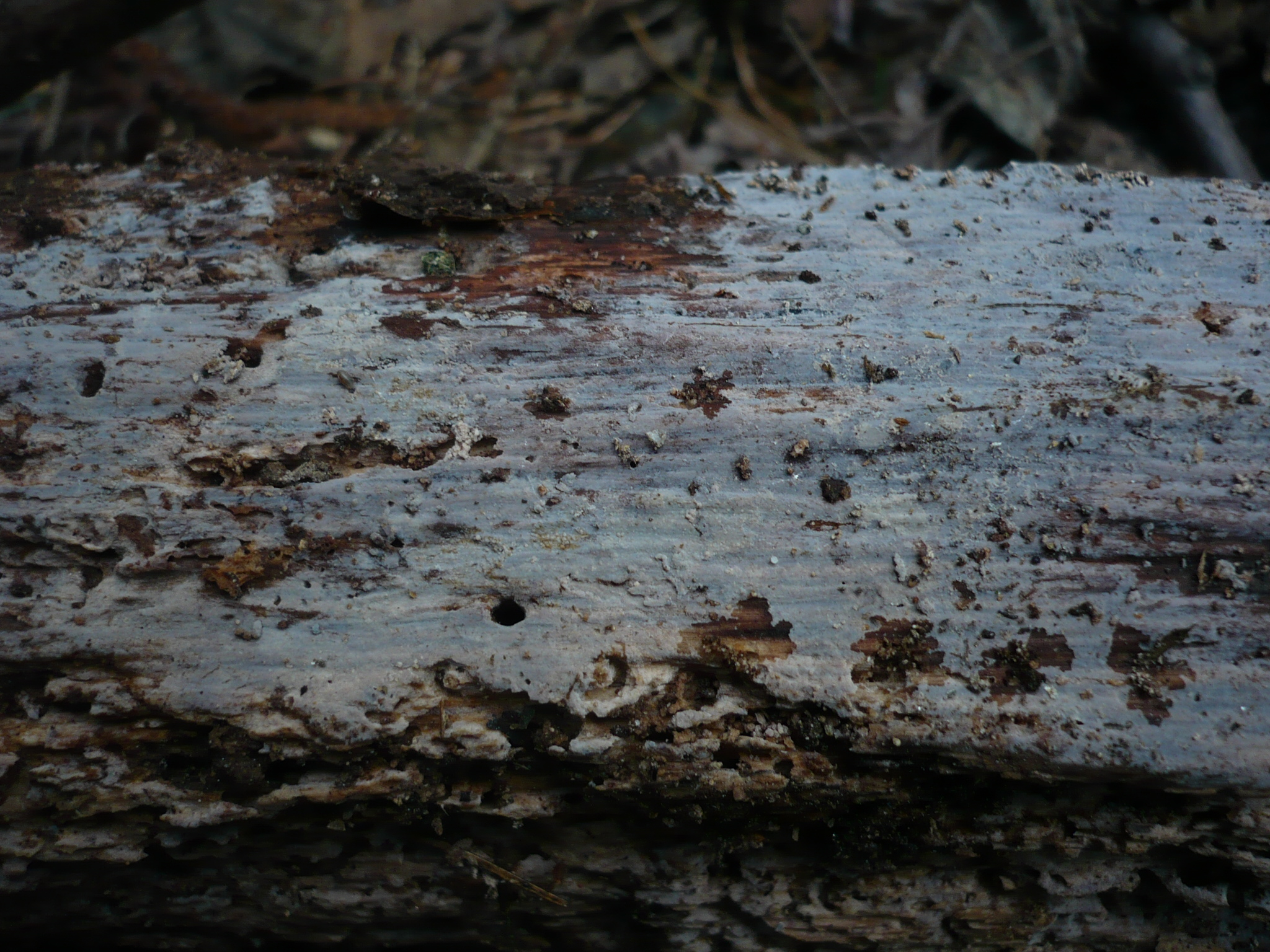
- Basidiodendron caesiocinereum

Scientific classification
- Domain: Eukaryota
- Kingdom: Fungi
- Division: Basidiomycota
- Class: Agaricomycetes
- Order: Auriculariales
- Family: incertae sedis
- Genus: Basidiodendron; Rick (1938)

Type species
- Basidiodendron luteogriseum Rick (1938)

= Basidiodendron =

Genus of fungi

Basidiodendron is a genus of fungi in the order Auriculariales. Basidiocarps (fruit bodies) are corticioid, thin, effused and are typically found on fallen wood. The genus is widespread in both temperate and tropical regions and contains over 30 species.

== Taxonomy ==
The genus was introduced for a single species by Brazilian mycologist Johannes Rick in 1938, but its modern interpretation was established by Canadian mycologist E. Robena Luck-Allen in 1963. She placed a number of species previously referred to Bourdotia into Basidiodendron based microscopically on their septate basidia, the presence of gloeocystidia, and the production of basidia on distinctive "involucrate" stalks.

Molecular research, based on cladistic analysis of DNA sequences, has substantially supported Luck-Allen's circumscription of Basidiodendron, though the less typical, larger-spored species remain as yet unsequenced.

== Species ==
- Basidiodendron alni
- Basidiodendron caesiocinereum
- Basidiodendron caucasicum
- Basidiodendron cinerellum
- Basidiodendron cinereum
- Basidiodendron cremeum
- Basidiodendron deminutum
- Basidiodendron excentrispora
- Basidiodendron eyrei
- Basidiodendron farinaceum
- Basidiodendron fulvum
- Basidiodendron glaucum
- Basidiodendron globisporum
- Basidiodendron grandinioides
- Basidiodendron groningae
- Basidiodendron inconspicuum
- Basidiodendron iniquum
- Basidiodendron luteogriseum
- Basidiodendron mexicanum
- Basidiodendron microsporum
- Basidiodendron minutisporum
- Basidiodendron nikau
- Basidiodendron olivaceum
- Basidiodendron parile
- Basidiodendron pelinum
- Basidiodendron pini
- Basidiodendron radians
- Basidiodendron remotum
- Basidiodendron rimosum
- Basidiodendron robenae
- Basidiodendron salebrosum
- Basidiodendron spiculosum
- Basidiodendron spinosum
- Basidiodendron trachysporum
- Basidiodendron walleynii
- Basidiodendron widdringtoniae
