= Hauerslevia =

Scientific classification
- Kingdom: Fungi
- Division: Basidiomycota
- Class: Agaricomycetes
- Order: Auriculariales
- Family: incertae sedis
- Genus: Hauerslevia; P. Roberts (1998)

Type species
- Hauerslevia pulverulenta (Hauerslev) P. Roberts (1998)

Genus of fungi

Hauerslevia is a fungal genus of uncertain familial placement (incertae sedis) in the order Auriculariales. The genus is monotypic, containing the single species Hauerslevia pulverulenta, known from Europe. Basidiocarps (fruit bodies) are effused, with partly septate basidia, conspicuous cystidia, and hyphae lacking clamp connections.
