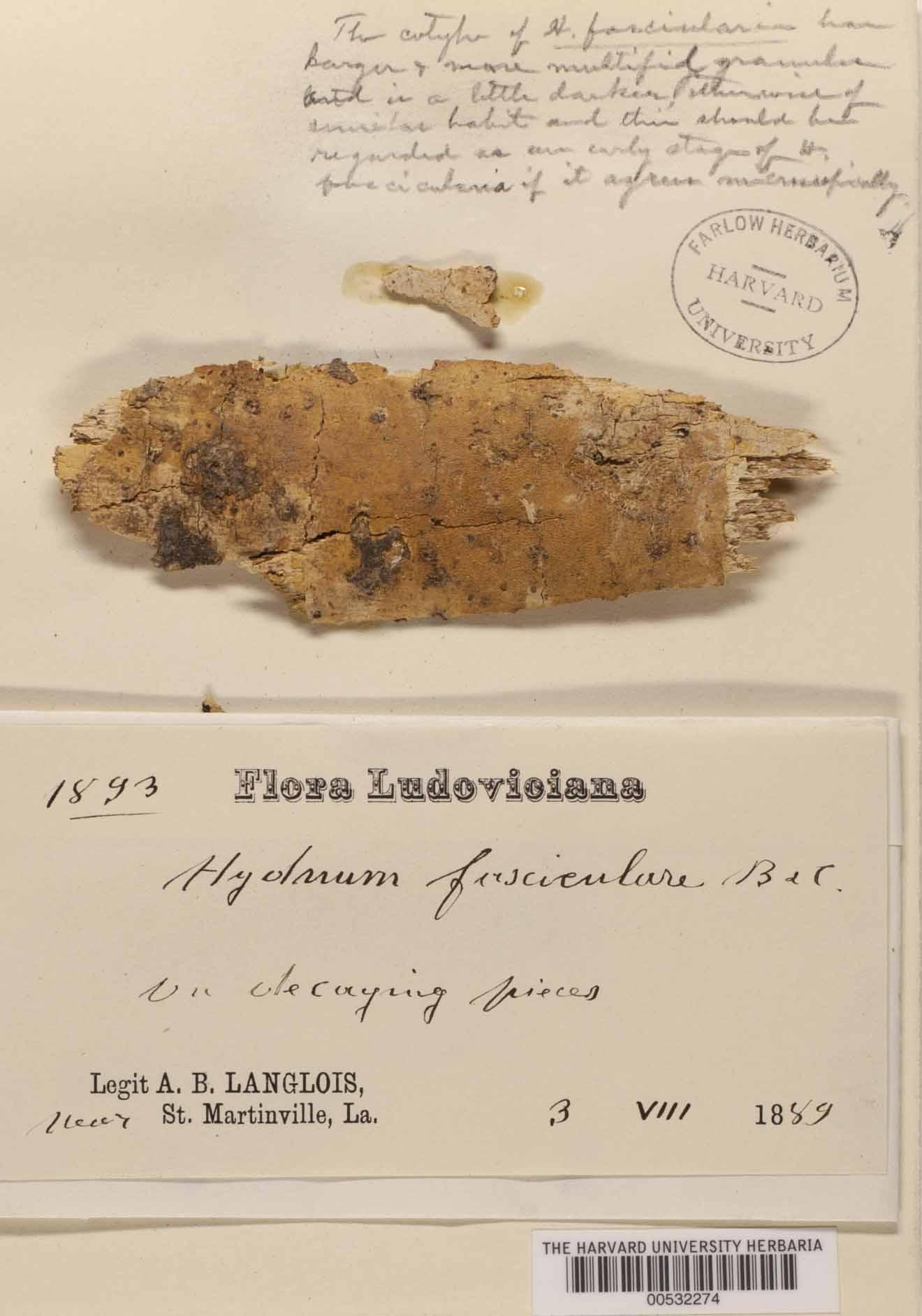
- Protodontia fascicularis

Scientific classification
- Domain: Eukaryota
- Kingdom: Fungi
- Division: Basidiomycota
- Class: Agaricomycetes
- Order: Auriculariales
- Family: Hyaloriaceae
- Genus: Protodontia

Type species
- Protodontia uda

Other species
- See text

= Protodontia =

Genus of fungi

Protodontia is a genus of fungi in order Auriculariales.

== Species ==
According to Catalogue of Life (as of April 2024), the genus has 6 accepted species:

- Protodontia africana A. Savchenko & Spirin
- Protodontia fascicularis (Alb. & Schwein.) Pilát ex Wojewoda
- Protodontia filicina Parmasto
- Protodontia insularis Spirin & Malysheva
- Protodontia oligacantha G.W. Martin
- Protodontia piceicola (Kühner ex Bourdot) G.W. Martin
