= Heterorepetobasidium =

Scientific classification
- Kingdom: Fungi
- Division: Basidiomycota
- Class: Agaricomycetes
- Order: Auriculariales
- Family: incertae sedis
- Genus: Heterorepetobasidium; Chee J.Chen & Oberw. (2002)

Type species
- Heterorepetobasidium subglobosum Chee J.Chen & Oberw. (2002)

Species
- H. ellipsoideum H. subglobosum

Genus of fungi

Heterorepetobasidium is a genus of fungi of uncertain familial placement (incertae sedis) in the order Auriculariales. The genus is widespread, especially in tropical regions, and contains two Taiwanese species, H. ellipsoideum and H. subglobosum.
