= Elmerina =

Scientific classification
- Kingdom: Fungi
- Division: Basidiomycota
- Class: Agaricomycetes
- Order: Auriculariales
- Family: Auriculariaceae
- Genus: Elmerina; Bres. (1912)

Type species
- Elmerina cladophora (Berk.} Bres. (1912)

Species
- Elmerina hexagonoides; Elmerina sclerodontia

Genus of fungi

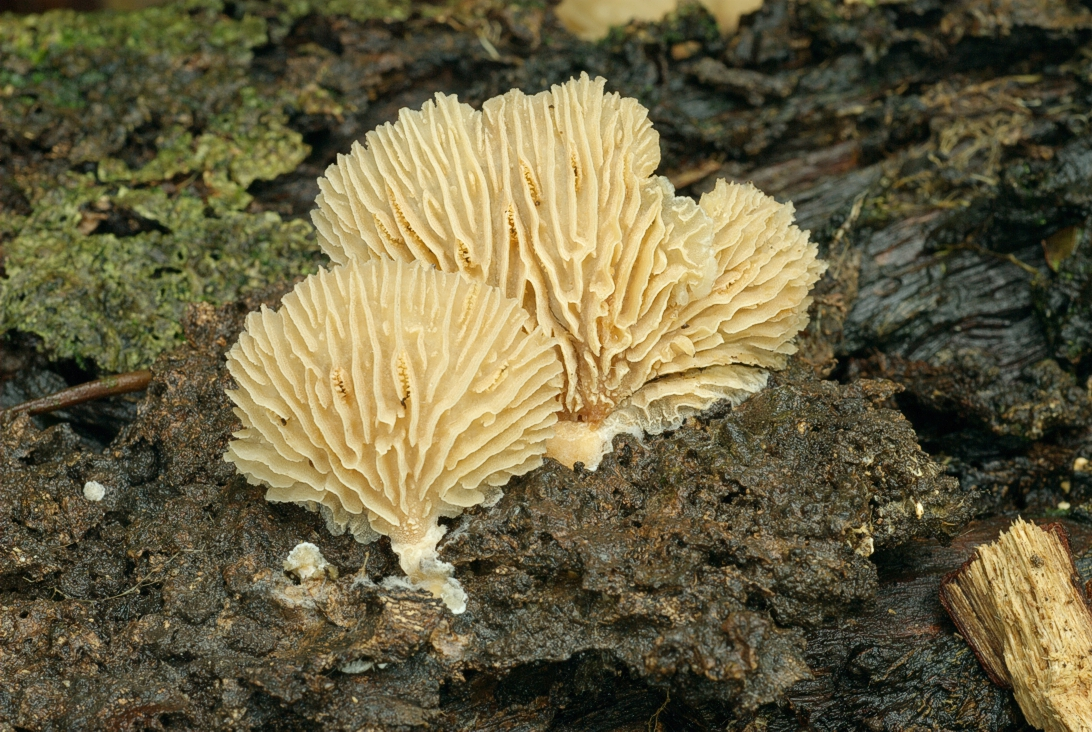
Elmerina holophaea, a polypore with gills.

Elmerina is a genus of fungi in the order Auriculariales. Basidiocarps (fruit bodies) are formed on dead wood and are either bracket-like with a poroid hymenium or densely clavarioid. Species are known from East Asia and Australia.

== Taxonomy ==
=== History ===
Elmerina was described by Italian mycologist Giacomo Bresadola to accommodate a distinctive polypore originally collected in the Philippines during the Challenger expedition. Bresadola named the genus in honour of Adolph Daniel Edward Elmer, an American botanist and plant collector. English mycologist Derek Reid later discovered that the basidia of the polypore were septate, thus placing the genus among the heterobasidiomycetes, and referred all species of poroid Auriculariales to Elmerina.

=== Current status ===
Molecular research, based on cladistic analysis of DNA sequences, has shown that Elmerina is a distinct genus, but only includes a minority of poroid Auriculariales, others being placed in the closely related genera Aporpium and Protodaedalea and the more distantly related genus Protomerulius. The densely spiny or clavarioid Elmerina sclerodontia is also included in the genus.
