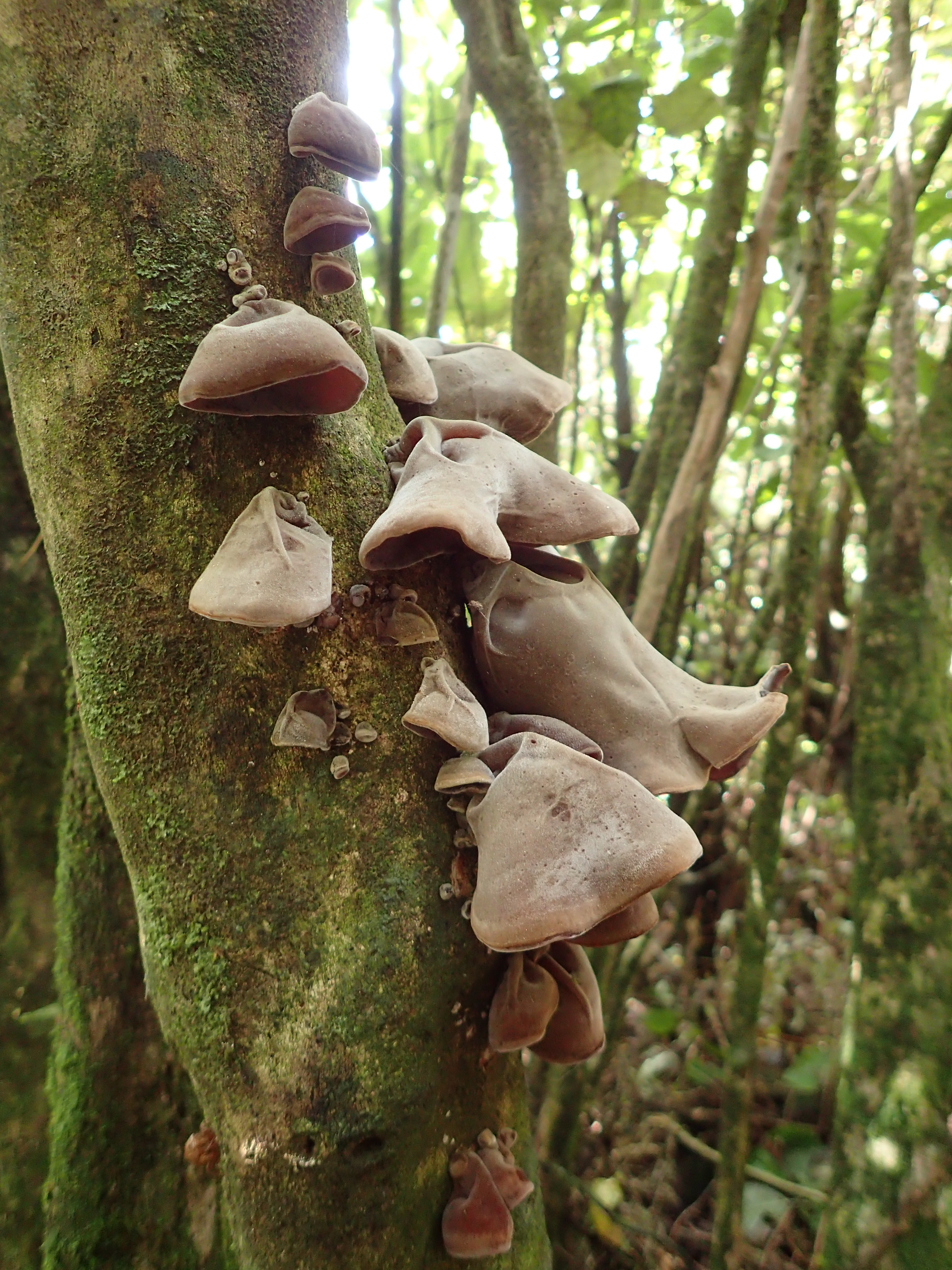
- Auricularia cornea, New Zealand

Scientific classification
- Kingdom: Fungi
- Division: Basidiomycota
- Class: Agaricomycetes
- Order: Auriculariales
- Family: Auriculariaceae
- Genus: Auricularia
- Species: A. cornea

Binomial name
- Auricularia cornea Ehrenb. (1820)

Synonyms
- Exidia cornea (Ehrenb.) Fr. (1822); Hirneola cornea (Ehrenb.) Fr. (1848)

= Auricularia cornea =

Species of fungus

Auricularia cornea, also known as hairy wood ear, is a species of fungus in the order Auriculariales. It is commercially cultivated in China, being a popular ingredient in many Chinese dishes and used in traditional Chinese medicine.

== Taxonomy ==
Auricularia cornea was originally described from Hawaii (Oahu) by German naturalist Christian Gottfried Ehrenberg in 1820. It was accepted as a distinct species by Bernard Lowy in his 1952 world monograph of Auricularia and subsequently confirmed as distinct by molecular research, based on cladistic analysis of DNA sequences.

Formerly, Auricularia cornea was often misidentified as A. polytricha. That species was originally described from the Eastern Ghats in India by French mycologist Camille Montagne in 1834, and (when used by American authors) is considered as a synonym of A. nigricans. The misidentification remains widespread, at least in Japan.

== Common names ==
The species is one of several gelatinous fungi known as wood ear, wood fungus, ear fungus, or tree ear fungus, alluding to their rubbery, ear-shaped fruitbodies.

In Hawaii it is known as pepeiao, which means "ear",. In New Zealand it is known as hakeke by Māori, while in the Philippines it is commonly referred to as taingang daga or tenga ng daga (rat's ears).

== Description ==
The fruit bodies are solitary or clustered, ear-shaped, laterally attached to wood, sometimes by a very short stalk, elastic, gelatinous, pale brown to reddish brown, rarely white, up to 9 centimetres (3 1/2 inches) wide and 2 mm thick. The upper surface is densely hairy and the lower surface is smooth.

Microscopically, the hairs on the upper surface are thick-walled, 180–425 × 6–9 μm. The basidia are cylindrical, hyaline, three-septate, 60–75 × 4–6 μm. The spores are hyaline, allantoid (sausage-shaped), and 14–16.5 × 4.5–6 μm.

== Habitat and distribution ==
Auricularia cornea grows on dead fallen or standing wood of broadleaf trees. The species is widely distributed in southern Asia, Africa, Australasia, the Pacific Islands, and South America.

== Uses ==
=== Culinary ===
Auricularia cornea is usually sold in dried form, and needs to be soaked in water before use. While almost tasteless, it is prized for its slippery but slightly crunchy texture, and its potential nutritional benefits. The slight crunchiness persists despite most cooking processes. Auricularia cornea is coarser than A. heimuer, and is more likely to be used in soups rather than stir fries.

Māori traditionally cooked wood ear fungus by steaming in an earth oven and eating with sow thistle and potatoes. From the 1870s to the 1950s, the fungus was collected and exported from New Zealand to China. The white, unpigmented form is now cultivated in China.

This fungus is used in Cantonese desserts.

=== Medicine ===
Although not evidence-based, according to traditional Chinese practitioners, eating dried and cooked wood ear can have health benefits for people with high blood pressure or cancer, and can prevent coronary heart disease and arteriosclerosis.
