= Patouillardina =

Scientific classification
- Domain: Eukaryota
- Kingdom: Fungi
- Division: Basidiomycota
- Class: Agaricomycetes
- Order: Auriculariales
- Family: Patouillardinaceae
- Genus: Patouillardina; Bres. (1906)

Type species
- Patouillardina cinerea Bres. (1906)

Genus of fungi

Patouillardina is a genus of fungi in the order Auriculariales. The type and only species, P. cinerea, forms waxy, effused, corticioid basidiocarps (fruit bodies) with basidia that are diagonally septate. The species is presumed to be saprotrophic, growing on dead wood. It was originally described from Brazil, but appears to be pantropical, having also been recorded from Brunei, Cambodia, Cameroon, Cuba, Guatemala, Mexico, Panama, and Tahiti.

The ascomycete genus Patouillardina G. Arnaud is an illegitimate later homonym. Both genera were named in honour of the French mycologist Narcisse Théophile Patouillard.
