= Endoperplexa =

Scientific classification
- Kingdom: Fungi
- Division: Basidiomycota
- Class: Agaricomycetes
- Order: Auriculariales
- Family: incertae sedis
- Genus: Endoperplexa; P.Roberts (1993)

Type species
- Endoperplexa dartmorica P.Roberts (1993)

Species
- E. dartmorica E. enodulosa E. obscura E. phlebioides E. subfarinacea E. tortola

Genus of fungi

Endoperplexa is a genus of fungi of uncertain familial placement (incertae sedis) in the order Auriculariales. The Dictionary of the Fungi (10th edition, 2008) report four species, but an additional two species have since been described or transferred into the genus.
