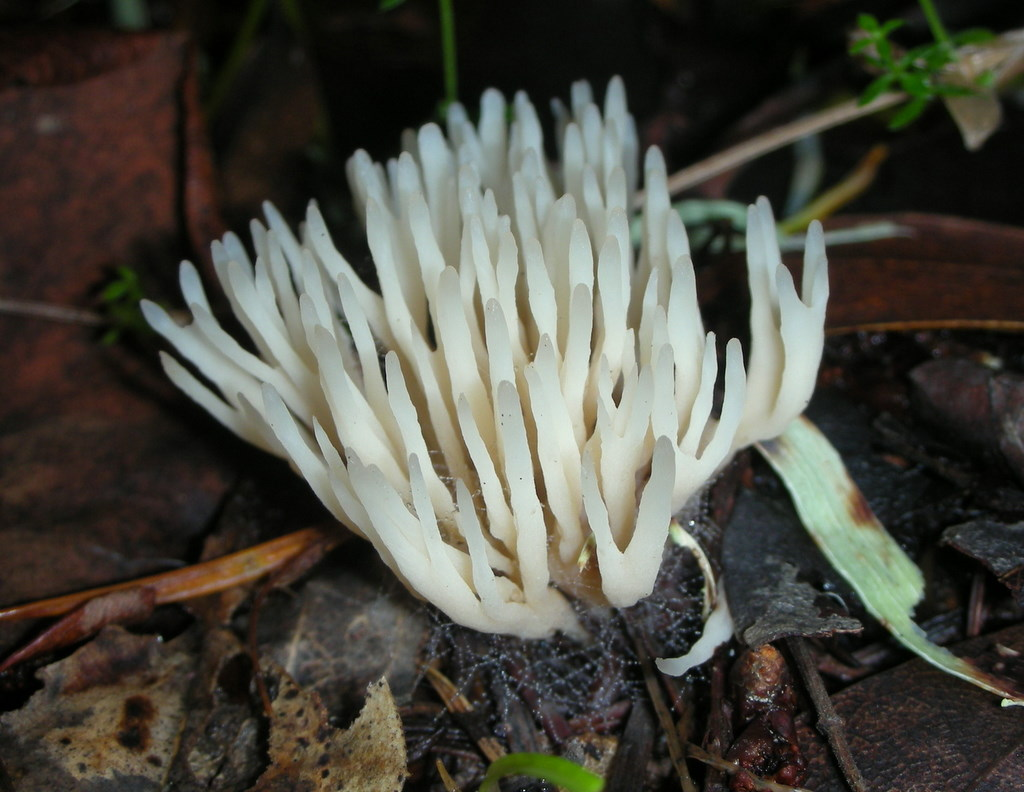

Scientific classification
- Kingdom: Fungi
- Division: Basidiomycota
- Class: Agaricomycetes
- Order: Tremellodendropsidales
- Family: Tremellodendropsidaceae
- Genus: Tremellodendropsis
- Species: T. tuberosa

Binomial name
- Tremellodendropsis tuberosa (Grev.) D.A.Crawford (1954)

Synonyms
- Merisma tuberosum Grev. (1825); Thelephora tuberosa (Grev.) Fr. (1828); Stereum tuberosum (Grev.) Massee (1892); Aphelaria tuberosa (Grev.) Corner (1950)

= Tremellodendropsis tuberosa =

Species of fungus

Tremellodendropsis tuberosa
- Mycological characteristics
- Smooth hymenium
- No distinct cap
- Hymenium attachment is irregular or not applicable
- Stipe is bare
- Spore print is white
- Edibility is unknown

Tremellodendropsis tuberosa, commonly known as the ashen coral, is a species of coral fungus in the family Tremellodendropsidaceae found in Eurasia and the Americas.

== Taxonomy ==
The species was first described as Merisma tuberosum by Scottish mycologist Robert Kaye Greville in 1825. D.A. Crawford transferred it to its current genus Tremellodendropsis in 1954, and made it the type species. It is classified in the subgenus Tremellodendropsis, which contains species with basidia that are partially partitioned (septate) at their apices; other species in this subgenus include Tremellodendropsis pusio and T. flagelliformis.

== Description ==
The fruit body is a coral-shaped structure ranging in height from 3 to 6 cm (1 1/8 to 2 3/8 in) and up to 5 cm (2 in) in diameter. The arms can be either unbranched, or sparsely branched, and the tips are rounded and frequently flattened. The fruit body is whitish, but tends to turn brownish in maturity. The tough stem is white, as is the flesh, and is covered with whitish mycelia at the base.

In deposit, the spores are white. Spores are elongated-elliptical or spindle-shaped, have a smooth surface, and measure 13–20 by 4.5–6.5 μm. The basidia (spore-bearing cells) often have longitudinal partitions at their apices.

Ramaria pallida looks superficially similar, but is light brown except for the whitish stalk base.

== Habitat and distribution ==
The fruit bodies grow on the ground in woods or clearings, singly or in groups. The fungus is known to occur in north temperate regions, including Europe and North America, and it is also found in South Brazil and Borneo.
