= Oliveoniaceae =

Scientific classification
- Kingdom: Fungi
- Division: Basidiomycota
- Class: Agaricomycetes
- Order: Auriculariales
- Family: Oliveoniaceae; P. Roberts (1998)

Genera
- Oliveonia; Sebacinella

Family of fungi

The Oliveoniaceae are a family of fungi in the order Auriculariales. Species form thin, effused, corticioid basidiocarps (fruit bodies) with aseptate basidia producing basidiospores that give rise to secondary spores. All species are believed to be saprotrophic, most growing on dead wood.
