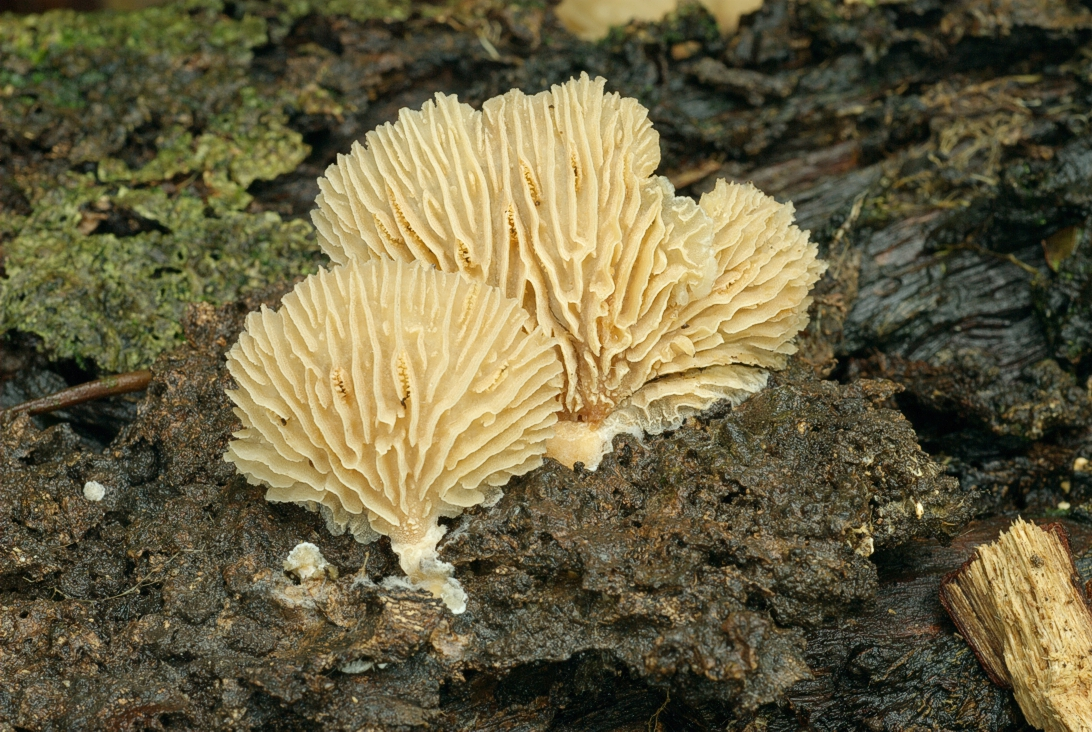
- Protodaedalea foliacea, Sumatra

Scientific classification
- Kingdom: Fungi
- Division: Basidiomycota
- Class: Agaricomycetes
- Order: Auriculariales
- Family: Auriculariaceae
- Genus: Protodaedalea; Imazeki (1955)

Type species
- Protodaedalea hispida Imazeki (1955)

Species
- Protodaedalea foliacea

= Protodaedalea =

Genus of fungi

Protodaedalea is a genus of fungi in the family Auriculariaceae. Species produce bracket-like basidiocarps (fruit bodies) on wood with a lamellate (gilled) undersurface. The genus currently comprises two species, both known from Asia.
