= Wood ear =

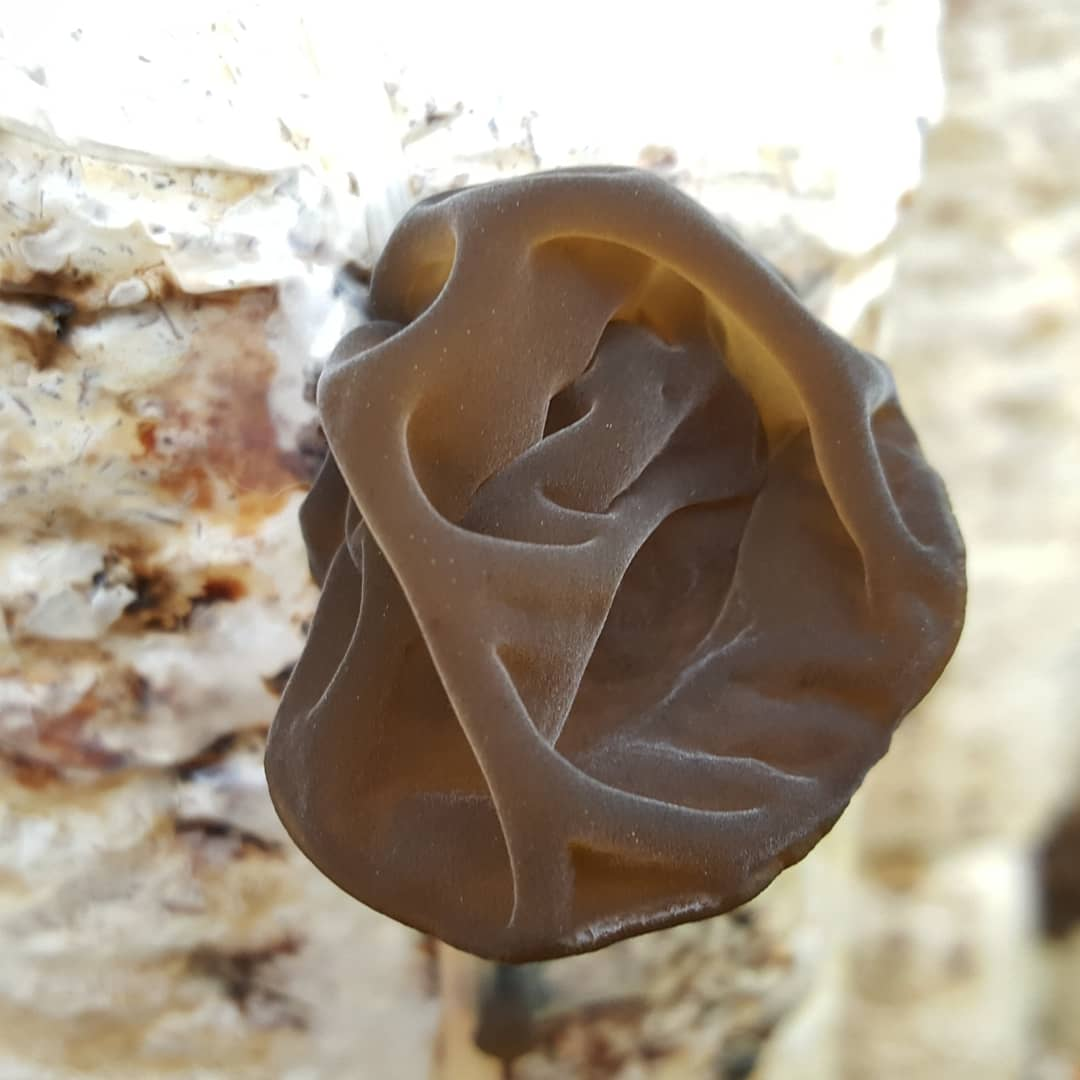
Auricularia heimuer

Wood-ear or tree ear (Chinese: 木耳; pinyin: mù'ěr, Korean: 목이 버섯), also translated wood jellyfish or tree jellyfish (Japanese: キクラゲ, Hepburn: ki-kurage), can refer to a few similar-looking edible fungi used primarily in Chinese cuisine; these are commonly sold in Asian markets shredded and dried. They are eaten cooked and added to dishes for texture, as their mild nature takes on the flavour of the dish.

- Auricularia heimuer (黑木耳, black ear fungus, cloud ear fungus), previously misdetermined as Auricularia auricula-judae
- Auricularia cornea (毛木耳, hairy wood ear), formerly denoted as Auricularia polytricha
- Tremella fuciformis (银耳, white/silver ear fungus)

The black and hairy wood ear fungi are similar in appearance and closely related. The white ear fungus is superficially similar but has important ecological, taxonomical, and culinary differences.

Other species in the genus Auricularia may be commonly called "wood ear" where they are found.

== See also ==
- Wood-decay fungus
