= Protomerulius =

Scientific classification
- Domain: Eukaryota
- Kingdom: Fungi
- Division: Basidiomycota
- Class: Agaricomycetes
- Order: Auriculariales
- Genus: Protomerulius; A.Møller (1895)

Type species
- Protomerulius brasiliensis A.Møller (1895)

Species
- Protomerulius africanus Protomerulius brachysporus Protomerulius commotus Protomerulius dubius Protomerulius hebes Protomerulius madidus Protomerulius microsporus Protomerulius minor Protomerulius pertusus Protomerulius subreflexus Protomerulius substuppeus

Synonyms
- Heterochaetella (Bourdot) Bourdot & Galzin (1928)

Genus of fungi

Protomerulius is a genus of fungi in the order Auriculariales. Basidiocarps (fruit bodies) are formed on dead wood and have an effused, smooth, spiny, or poroid hymenium. The genus is cosmopolitan.

== Taxonomy ==
The genus was originally described from Brazil to accommodate a fungus that resembled a polypore but microscopically had septate basidia. The genus name was subsequently extended to include other fungi with a similar combination of features.

Molecular research, based on cladistic analysis of DNA sequences, has shown, however, that the type species of Protomerulius, P. brasiliensis (a synonym of P. substuppeus) is not closely related to most other poroid species with septate basidia, some of which are now placed in the genera Aporpium, Elmerina, and Protodaedalea. Instead, it is closely related to several effused species with a smooth or spiny hymenium, including the type species of the genus Heterochaetella.
