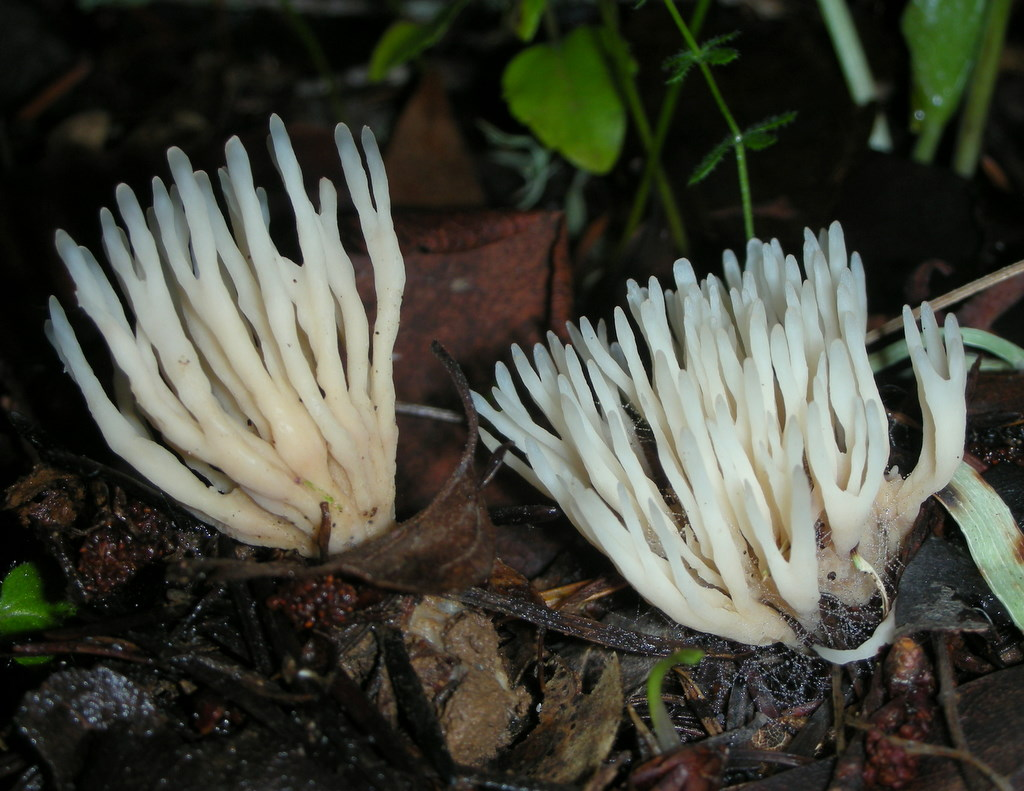
- Tremellodendropsis tuberosa

Scientific classification
- Kingdom: Fungi
- Division: Basidiomycota
- Class: Agaricomycetes
- Order: Tremellodendropsidales
- Family: Tremellodendropsidaceae; Jülich (1982)

Genera
- Tremellodendropsis

= Tremellodendropsidaceae =

Order of fungi

The Tremellodendropsidaceae are a family of fungi in the class Agaricomycetes. The family currently comprises a single genus containing a small group of clavarioid fungi with partly septate basidia.
