= Hyalodon =

Scientific classification
- Domain: Eukaryota
- Kingdom: Fungi
- Division: Basidiomycota
- Class: Agaricomycetes
- Order: Auriculariales
- Genus: Hyalodon; Malysheva & Spirin (2018)

Type species
- Hyalodon piceicola (Kühner ex Bourdot) Malysheva & Spirin (2018)

Species
- Hyalodon antui; Hyalodon sibiricus

Genus of fungi

Hyalodon is a genus of fungi in the order Auriculariales. Species occur on dead wood in Europe and Asia, producing effused, gelatininous basidiocarps (fruit bodies) covered in small spines. Molecular research, based on cladistic analysis of DNA sequences, has shown that the genus is distinct.
