= Mycostilla =

Scientific classification
- Kingdom: Fungi
- Division: Basidiomycota
- Class: Agaricomycetes
- Order: Auriculariales
- Genus: Mycostilla; Spirin & Malysheva (2018)

Type species
- Mycostilla vermiformis (Berk. & Broome) Spirin & Malysheva (2018)

species
- Mycostilla chromatica

Genus of fungi

Mycostilla is a genus of fungi in the order Auriculariales. The type, Mycostilla vermiformis, forms effused, gelatinous, crystalline or net-like basidiocarps (fruit bodies) on fallen conifer wood in Europe. The species was formerly placed in Stypella, but the latter genus is of uncertain disposition and appears unrelated to the Auriculariales. Molecular research, based on cladistic analysis of DNA sequences, distinguishes Mycostilla from morphologically similar genera.
