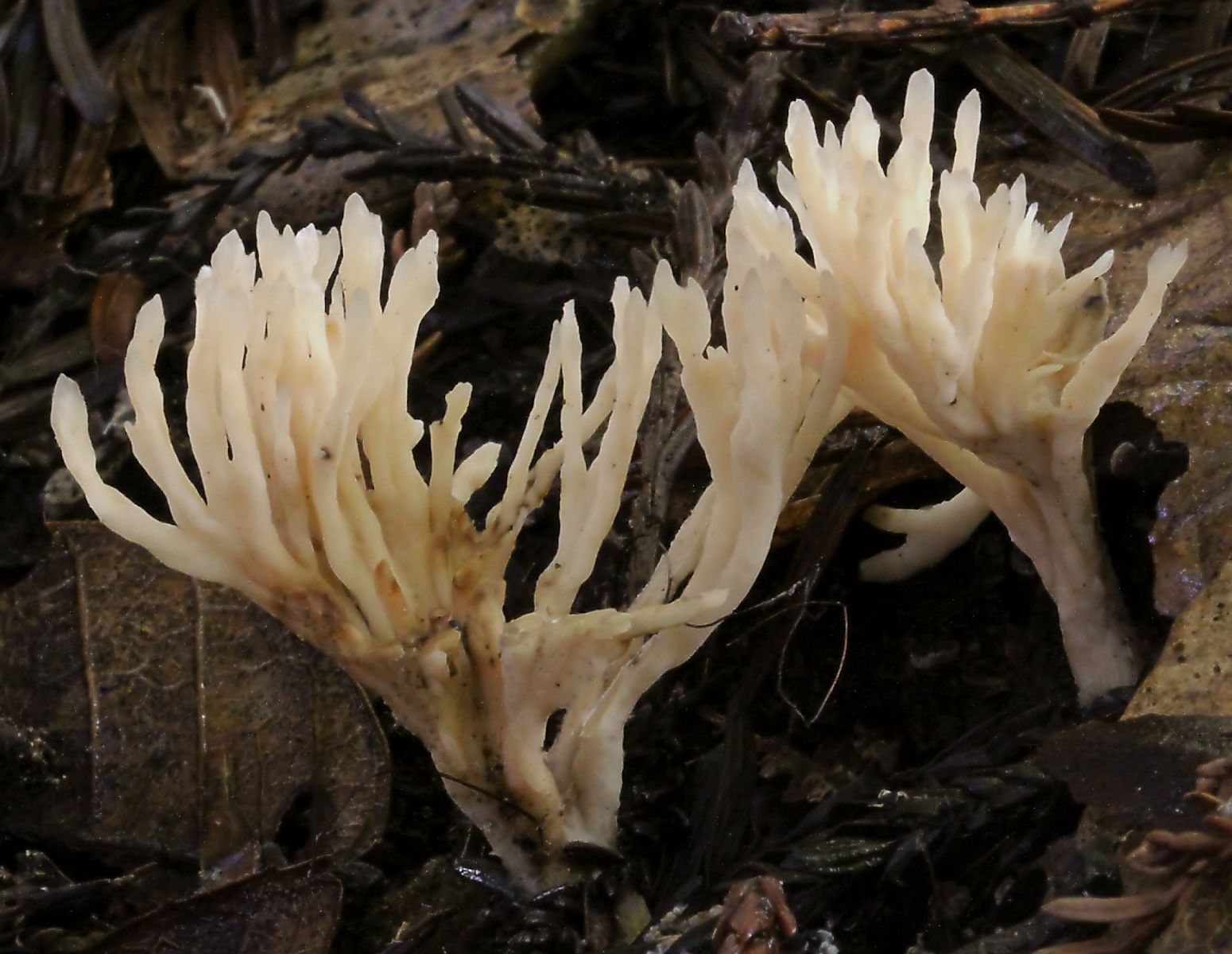
- Tremellodendropsis tuberosa

Scientific classification
- Kingdom: Fungi
- Division: Basidiomycota
- Class: Agaricomycetes
- Order: Tremellodendropsidales; Vizzini (2014)

Families
- Tremellodendropsidaceae

= Tremellodendropsidales =

Order of fungi

The Tremellodendropsidales are an order of fungi in the class Agaricomycetes. The order currently comprises a single family containing a small group of clavarioid fungi with partly septate basidia. The order was established as a result of molecular research, based on cladistic analysis of DNA sequences.
