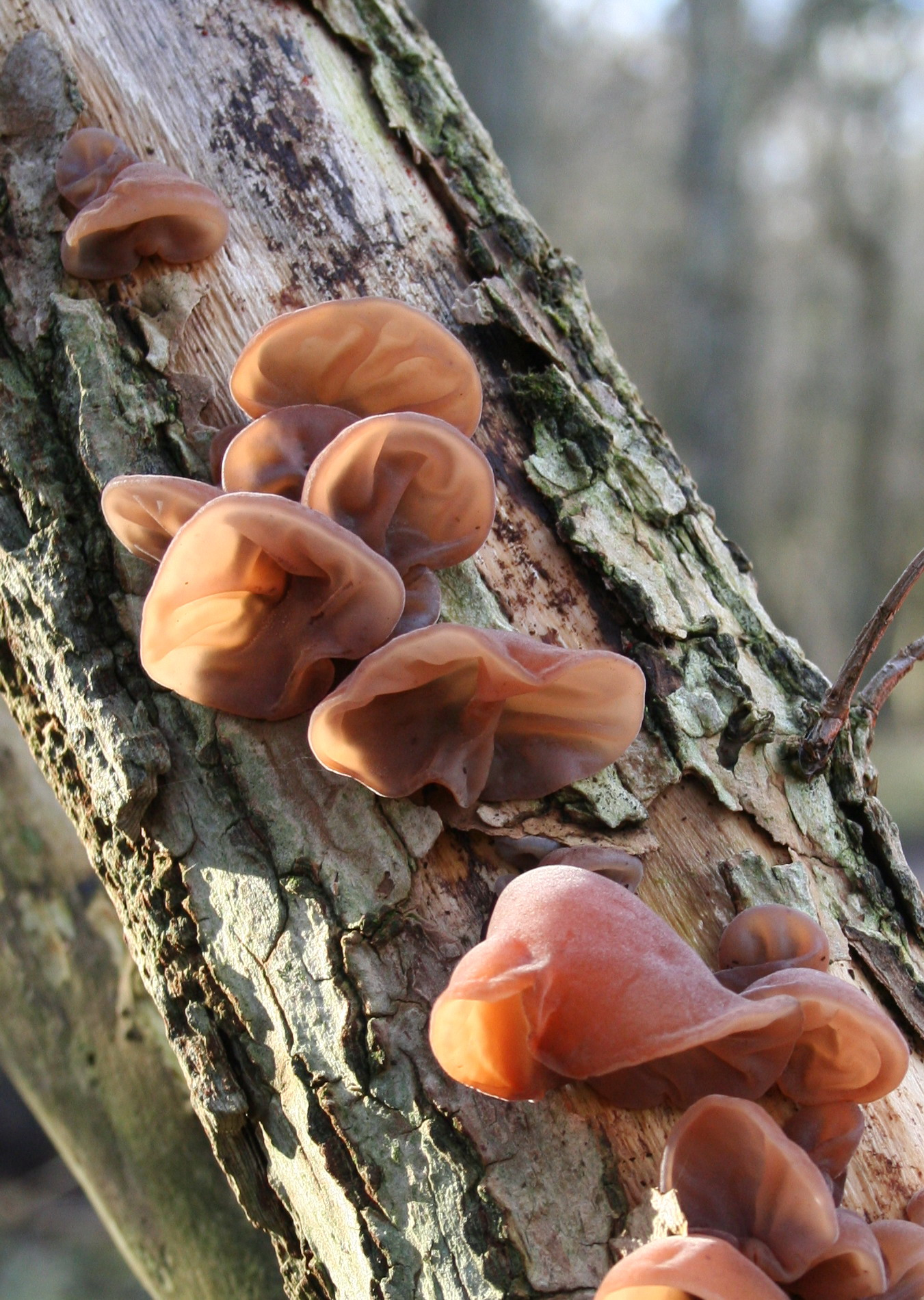
- Auricularia auricula-judae

Scientific classification
- Kingdom: Fungi
- Division: Basidiomycota
- Class: Agaricomycetes
- Order: Auriculariales; J. Schröt. (1889)

Families
- Auriculariaceae; Heteroscyphaceae; Hyaloriaceae; Oliveoniaceae; Patouillardinaceae genera incertae sedis (no family) Aporpium Atractobasidium Basidiodendron Ceratosebacina Crystallodon Dendrogloeon Endoperplexa Gelacantha Grammatus Guepinia Hauerslevia Heterorepetobasidium Heteroscypha Hyalodon Hydrophana Metabourdotia Metulochaete Mycostilla Myxariellum Ofella Ovipoculum Porpopycnis Protoacia Protodontia Protohydnum Protomerulius Protoradulum Pseudohydnum Psilochaete Renatobasidium Stypellopsis

Synonyms
- Aporpiales Bond. & M. Bond. (1960); Exidiales R.T. Moore (1996)

= Auriculariales =

Order of fungi

The Auriculariales are an order of fungi in the class Agaricomycetes. Species within the order were formerly referred to the "heterobasidiomycetes" or "jelly fungi", since many have gelatinous basidiocarps (fruit bodies) that produce spores on septate basidia. Around 200 species are known worldwide, placed in six or more families, though the status of these families is currently uncertain. All species in the Auriculariales are believed to be saprotrophic, most growing on dead wood. Fruit bodies of several Auricularia species are cultivated for food on a commercial scale, especially in China.

== Taxonomy ==
=== History ===
The order was established in 1889 by German mycologist Joseph Schröter to accommodate species of fungi having "auricularioid" basidia (more or less cylindrical basidia with lateral septa), including many of the rusts and smuts. In 1922, British mycologist Carleton Rea recognized the order as containing the families Auriculariaceae and Ecchynaceae, as well as the rusts (Coleosporiaceae and Pucciniaceae) and the smuts (Ustilaginaceae). Many subsequent authors, however, separated out the rusts and smuts and amalgamated the remaining Auriculariales with the Tremellales. Jülich (1981) also separated out the rusts and smuts, but recognized the remaining Auriculariales as an independent order, placing within them the families Auriculariaceae, Cystobasidiaceae, Paraphelariaceae, Saccoblastiaceae, Ecchynaceae, Hoehnelomycetaceae, and Patouillardinaceae.

A radical revision was undertaken in 1984, when American mycologist Robert Joseph Bandoni used transmission electron microscopy to investigate the ultrastructure of the septal pore apparatus in the Auriculariales. This revealed that species of fungi with "auricularioid" basidia were not necessarily closely related and that Auricularia had more in common with Exidia and its allies (with "tremelloid" basidia), than with other auricularioid fungi. Bandoni therefore amended the Auriculariales to include the family Auriculariaceae (with auricularioid basidia) together with the families Exidiaceae, Aporpiaceae, Hyaloriaceae, and Sebacinaceae (with tremelloid basidia). This revision was accepted by Wells (1994) who, however, amalgamated the Aporpiaceae and Hyaloriaceae (together with the Heteroscyphaceae) and added the families Patouillardinaceae (with diagonally septate basidia) and Tremellodendropsidaceae (with partly septate basidia). Roberts (1998) subsequently added the family Oliveoniaceae (with non-septate basidia).

=== Current status ===
Molecular research, based on cladistic analysis of DNA sequences, has substantially supported Bandoni's revised circumscription of the Auriculariales, but has moved the Sebacinaceae and the Tremellodendropsidaceae to their own separate orders, the Sebacinales and Tremellodendropsidales. The status of the constituent families has not yet been examined, but a clade containing Auricularia and Exidia species equates to the Auriculariaceae, whilst another containing Hyaloria and Myxarium species equates to the Hyaloriaceae.

== Description ==
The majority of species within the Auriculariales produce gelatinous basidiocarps (fruit bodies) on dead wood. In some these are conspicuous and may be ear-shaped, button-shaped, lobed, bracket-like, or effused. Their hymenophores (spore-bearing surfaces) may be smooth, warted, veined, toothed (as in the genus Pseudohydnum), cyphelloid (as in the genus Heteroscypha), or poroid (as in the genera Elmerina and Aporpium). Some species, however, produce dry, leathery, or web-like fruit bodies resembling those of the corticioid fungi.

== Distribution and habitat ==
All species within the Auriculariales are thought to be saprotrophs, most of them wood-rotters. They are typically found on dead attached or fallen wood, though a few (Guepinia species) are normally found on the ground. As a group, their distribution is cosmopolitan.

== Economic importance ==
Several species within the order are edible and two, Auricularia heimuer and Auricularia cornea, are cultivated on a commercial scale, particularly in China and southeast Asia.

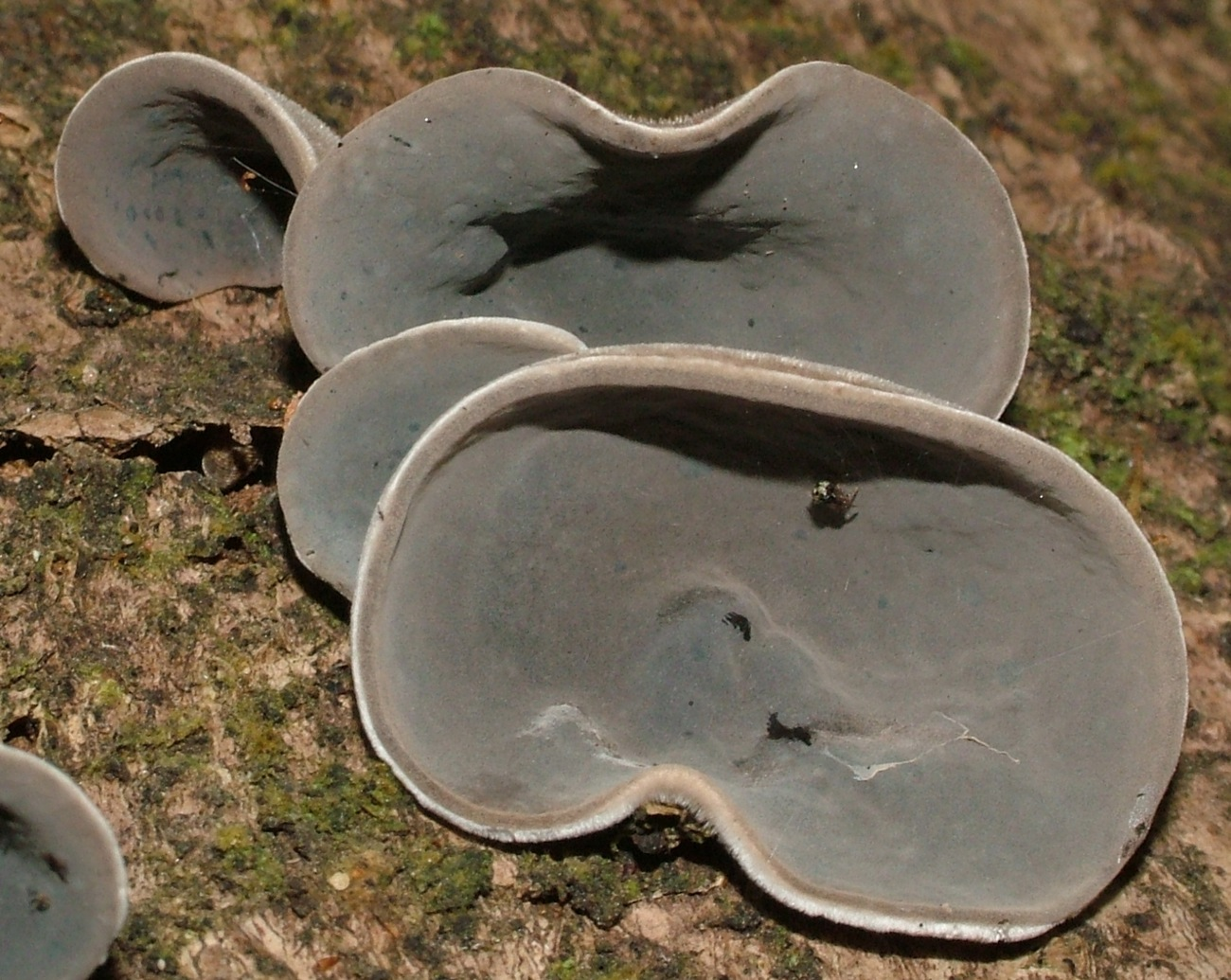
Auricularia cornea (Auriculariaceae)

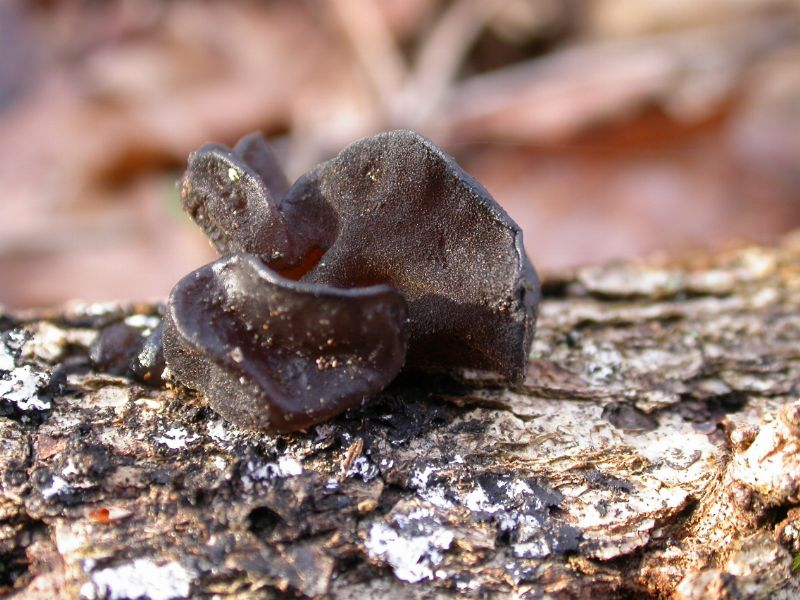
Exidia glandulosa (Auriculariaceae)

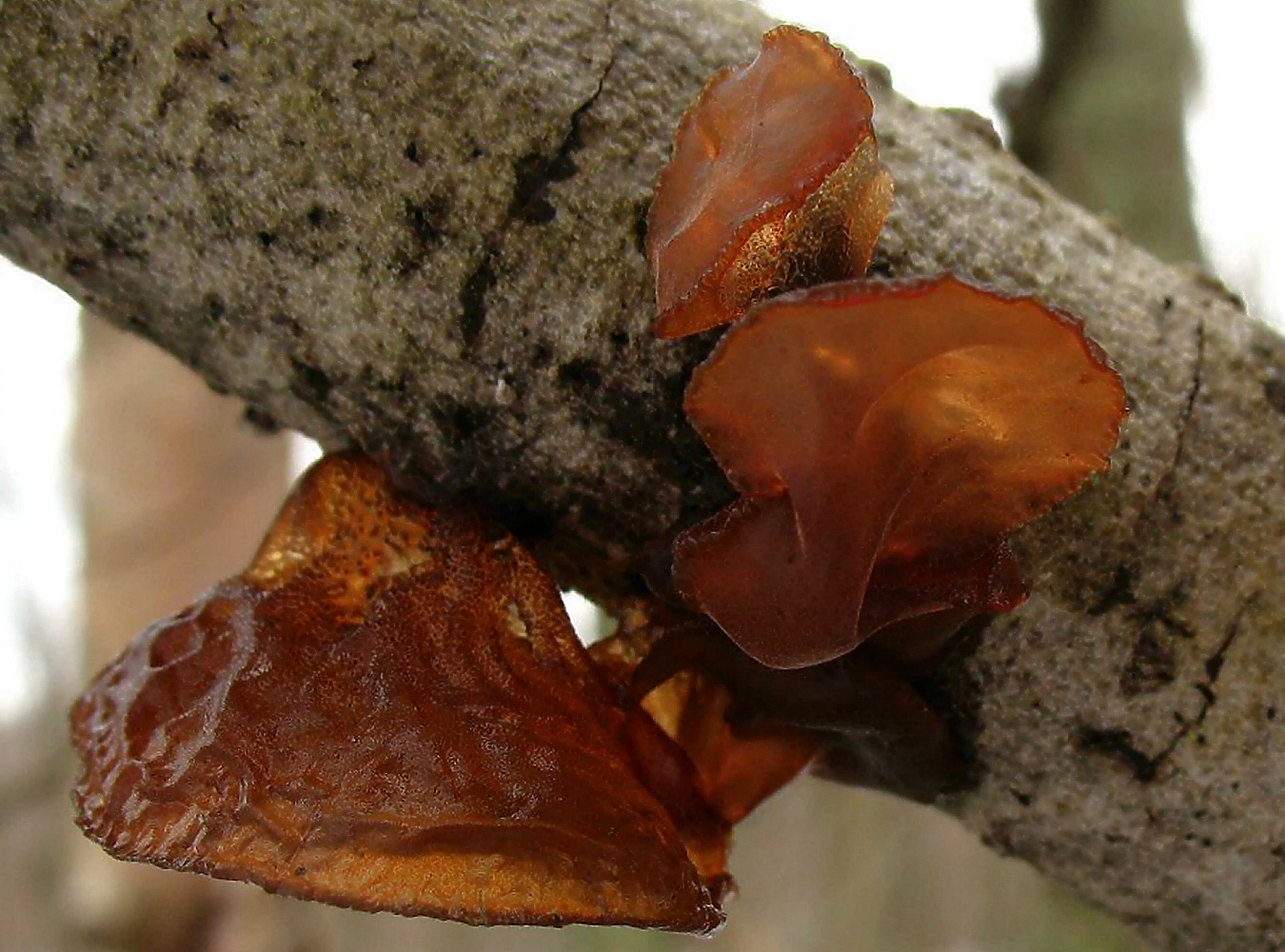
Exidia recisa (Auriculariaceae)

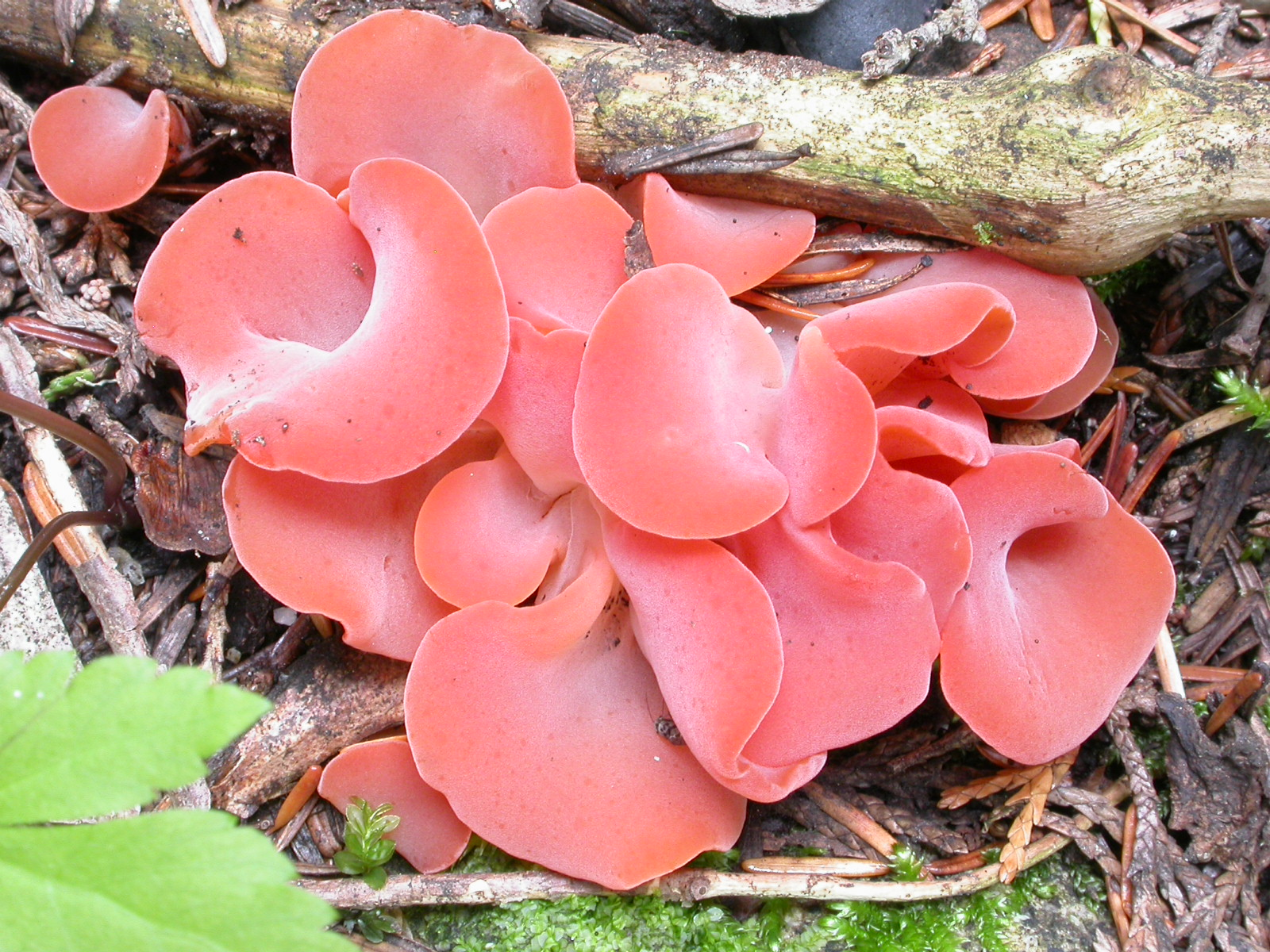
Guepinia helvelloides (incertae sedis)

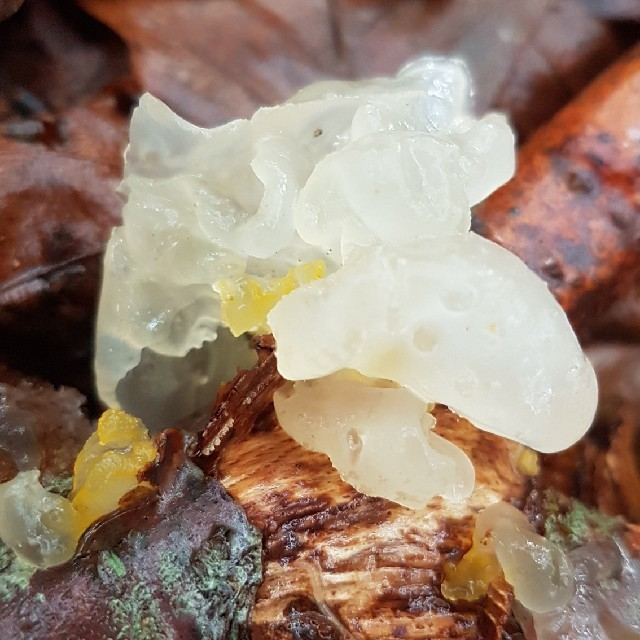
Myxarium nucleatum (Hyaloriaceae)

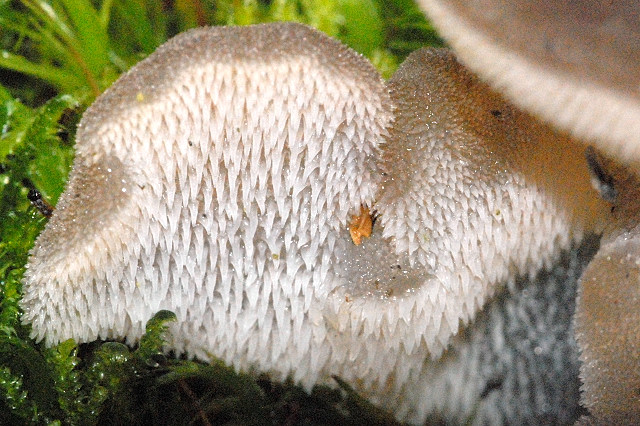
Pseudohydnum gelatinosum
(incertae sedis)
