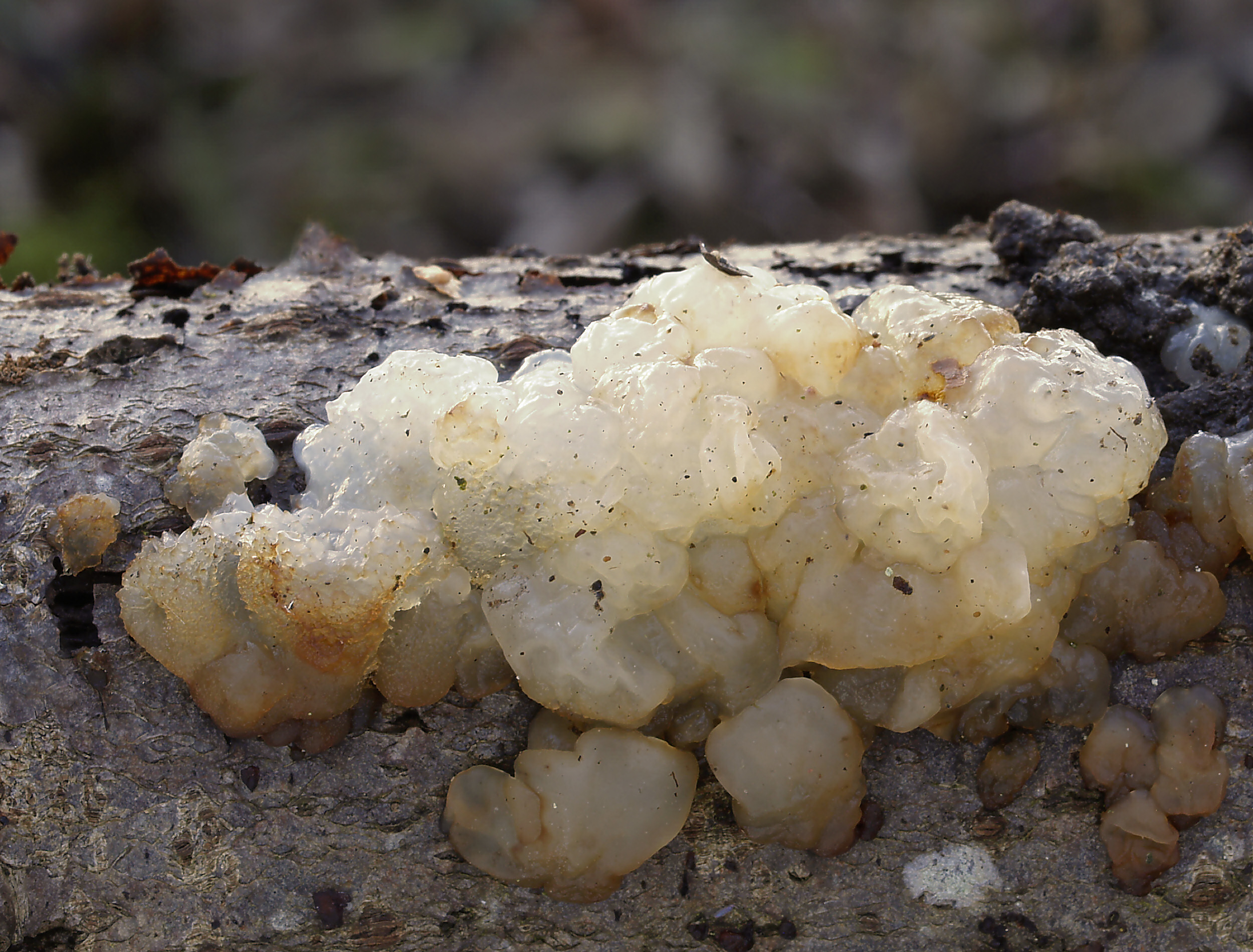

Scientific classification
- Kingdom: Fungi
- Division: Basidiomycota
- Class: Agaricomycetes
- Order: Auriculariales
- Family: Auriculariaceae
- Genus: Exidia
- Species: E. candida

Binomial name
- Exidia candida Lloyd (1916)

Synonyms
- Exidia villosa Neuhoff (1935); Exidia cartilaginea S. Lundell & Neuhoff (1935)

= Exidia candida =

Species of fungus

Exidia candida is a species of fungus in the family Auriculariaceae. Basidiocarps (fruit bodies) are gelatinous, whitish, and cushioned-shaped at first, becoming effused and corrugated.

It typically grows on logs and fallen branches of lime (Tilia species) and other broadleaved trees. The species occurs in both North America and Europe. A distinctive variety, Exidia candida var. cartilaginea, is bicoloured whitish and ochre to brown, grows preferentially on birch and alder, has a northerly distribution, and occurs in North America, Europe, and the Russian Far East.

== Taxonomy ==
The species was originally described from Washington state in 1916 by American mycologist Curtis Gates Lloyd. Molecular research, based on cladistic analysis of DNA sequences, has shown that Exidia candida is the same as the European E. villosa. The same research also shows that E. cartilaginea is a further synonym, though its distinctive morphology and habitat have led to its recognition as the varietal level as E. candida var. cartilaginea.

== Description ==
Exidia candida forms whitish, gelatinous fruit bodies that are cushion-shaped at first, later coalescing to become effused but irregularly corrugated or brain-like, around 20 centimetres (8 in) across by 2 cm (3/4 in) thick. Small, white, mineral inclusions are often visible within the fruit bodies. Fruit body margins may be villose (finely hairy). The spore print is white. Exidia candida var. cartilaginea is similarly shaped, but older fruitbodies often become ochraceous-brown at the centre, remaining whitish at the margins.

=== Microscopic characters ===
The microscopic characters are typical of the genus Exidia. The basidia are ellipsoid, septate, 11 to 16 by 8.5 to 11 μm. The spores are weakly allantoid (sausage-shaped), 9 to 15 by 3 to 5 μm.

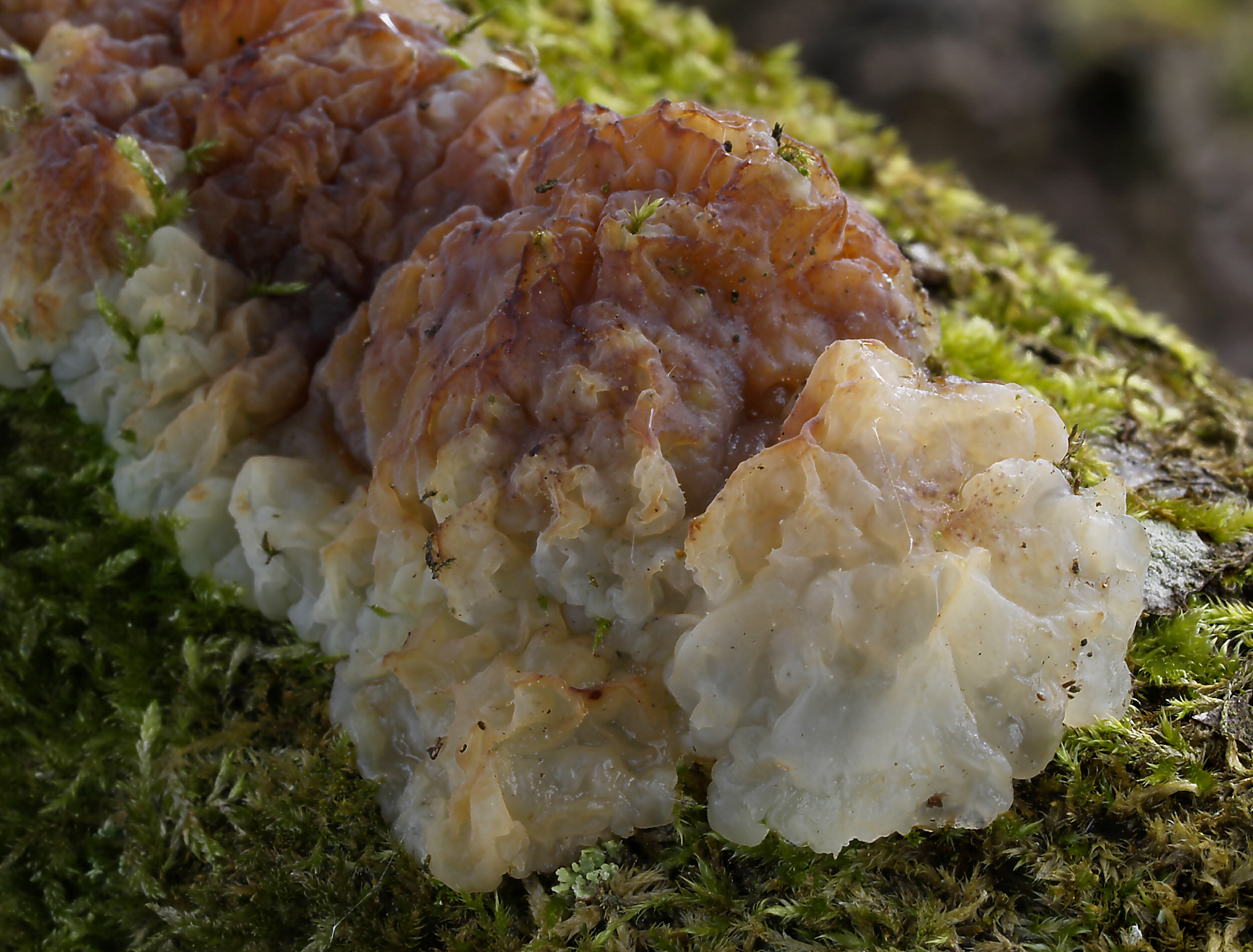
Exidia candida var. cartilaginea

=== Similar species ===
Fruit bodies of Exidia thuretiana are similarly coloured, but typically develop a pleated appearance when older. Fruit bodies lack mineral inclusions and are microscopically distinct in having larger spores (14 to 18 by 5 to 7.5 μm). Exidia thuretiana is a common and widespread species, with a preference for dead branches of beech. Fruit bodies of Myxarium nucleatum are also similar, but have larger, more visible mineral inclusions and are microscopically distinct in having basidia with an enucleate stalk.

== Habitat and distribution ==
Exidia candida is a wood-rotting species, typically found on dead attached twigs and branches of lime. It is widely distributed in North America and in continental Europe. Exidia candida var. cartilaginea grows preferentially on birch and alder, has a northerly distribution, and occurs in North America, northern Europe, and the Russian Far East.
