= Hirneolina =

Scientific classification
- Domain: Eukaryota
- Kingdom: Fungi
- Division: Basidiomycota
- Class: Agaricomycetes
- Order: Auriculariales
- Family: Auriculariaceae
- Genus: Hirneolina (Pat.) Bres. (1905)

Type species
- Hirneolina hirneoloides (Pat.) Sacc. & Trotter (1910)

Synonyms
- Sebacina sect. Hirneolina Pat. (1900)

Genus of fungi

Hirneolina is a genus of fungi in the order Auriculariales. Basidiocarps (fruit bodies) are effused, waxy, and occur on dead wood. Only the type species, described from Ecuador and reported from Brazil, is currently confirmed as belonging to the genus.

== Taxonomy ==
=== History ===
Hirneolina was originally published in 1900 by French mycologist Narcisse Patouillard as a subdivision of Sebacina, a genus then used for any species with tremelloid (vertically septate) basidia and effused basidiocarps. It was raised to the level of genus by Italian mycologist Giacomo Bresadola in 1905. An additional eight or so species were subsequently described in the genus. In 1969 American mycologist Kenneth Wells placed the type species, Hirneolina hirneoloides, within the genus Heterochaete, thereby reducing Hirneolina to a synonym.

=== Current status ===
Molecular research, based on cladistic analysis of DNA sequences, has indicated that Hirneolina hirneoloides is not closely related to Heterochaete and that Hirneolina is a distinct genus within the Auriculariaceae. Most other Hirneolina species have now, however, been referred to other genera, including Amphistereum. Eichleriella, and Heteroradulum.
