= Exidia zelleri =

Scientific classification
- Kingdom: Fungi
- Division: Basidiomycota
- Class: Agaricomycetes
- Order: Auriculariales
- Family: Auriculariaceae
- Genus: Exidia
- Species: E. zelleri

Binomial name
- Exidia zelleri Lloyd (1920)

Species of fungus

Exidia zelleri is a species of fungus in the family Auriculariaceae. Basidiocarps (fruit bodies) are gelatinous, grey-brown to black, button-shaped at first then sometimes coalescing and becoming irregularly effused. It grows on dead branches of broadleaved trees and is known from north-western North America and northern Europe.

== Taxonomy ==
The species was first described in 1920 from Oregon by mycologist Curtis Gates Lloyd.

== Description ==
The basidiocarps of E. zelleri are gelatinous, button-shaped to turbinate (top-shaped) and attached to the wood at a point, sometimes coalescing to form effused, irregular masses up to 8 cm across, grey brown to brownish black, darkening with age or when dry. All surfaces are smooth.

=== Microscopic characters ===
The translucent hyphae are thin-walled and form clamp connections. Basidia are septate, elliptical. 14.5 to 26 by 9 to 15 μm. Basidiospores are allantoid (sausage-shaped), 13 to 22 by 4 to 7 μm, with thin, smooth walls.

=== Similar species ===
Fruit bodies of Exidia crenata and Exidia recisa also occur on broadleaved trees in North America, but are typically reddish to orange-brown. Exidia glandulosa is brownish black and very similar, but has papillae (small pegs or pimples) on the upper surface.

== Distribution and habitat ==
Exidia zelleri was originally described from Oregon and has also been recorded from California, British Columbia, and Scandinavia. It was originally collected on dead wood of Acer, but has subsequently been reported on other broadleaved trees, particularly willow (Salix).
