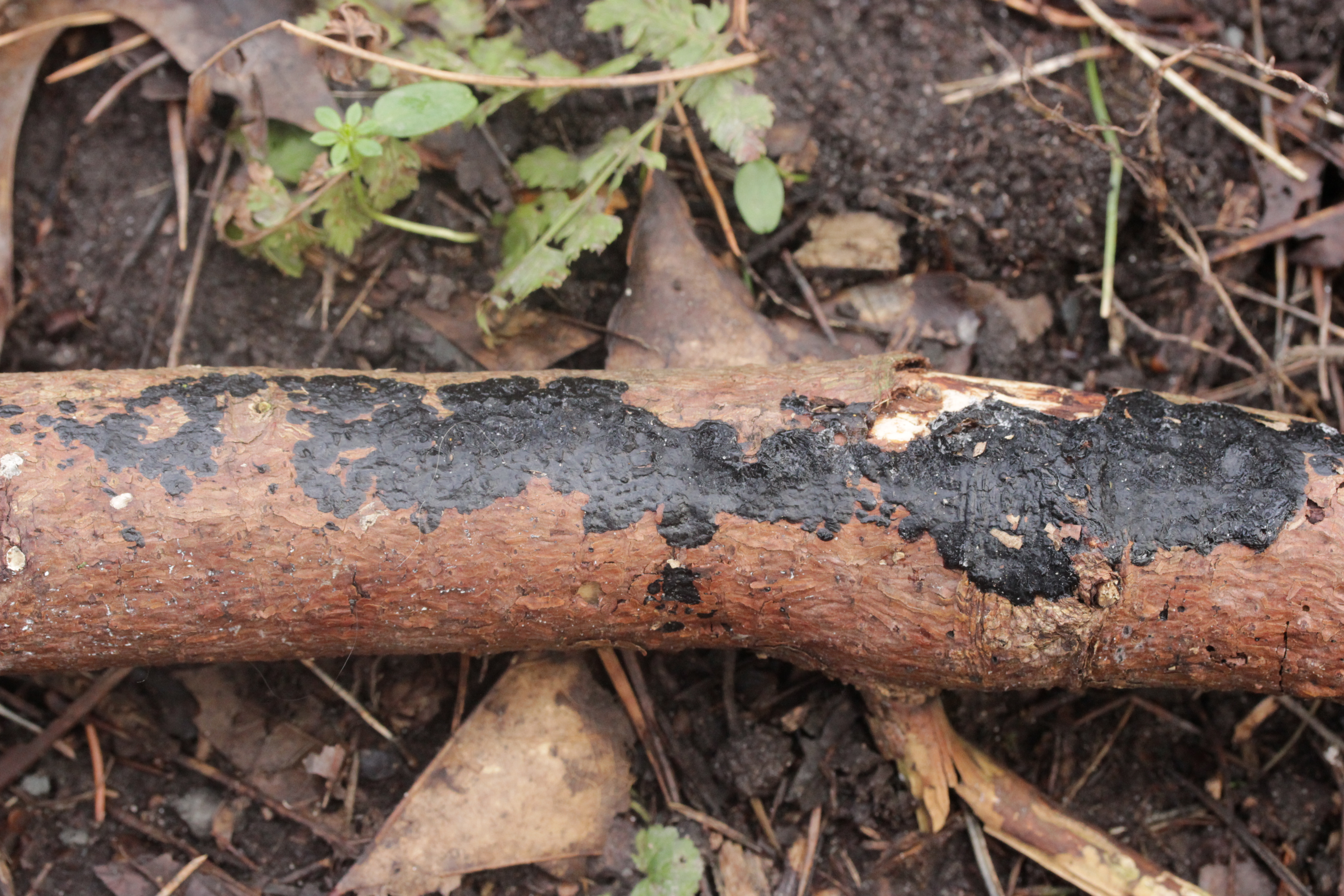

Scientific classification
- Kingdom: Fungi
- Division: Basidiomycota
- Class: Agaricomycetes
- Order: Auriculariales
- Family: Auriculariaceae
- Genus: Exidia
- Species: E. friesiana

Binomial name
- Exidia friesiana P. Karst. (1878)

= Exidia friesiana =

Species of fungus

Exidia friesiana is a species of fungus in the family Auriculariaceae. Basidiocarps (fruit bodies) are gelatinous, black, and button-shaped at first, later coalescing and drying to form tar-like patches. The species grows on dead branches of conifers in Europe and was formerly misinterpreted as Exidia pithya.

== Taxonomy ==
Exidia friesiana was originally found growing on spruce (Picea abies) in Finland and was described in 1878 by the Finnish mycologist Petter Karsten. It was treated as a synonym of E. pithya until the latter species was reinterpreted.

== Description ==
Exidia friesiana forms grey-black to black, gelatinous fruit bodies that are button-shaped at first, coalescing with age and forming effused patches up to 20 cm long. The upper, spore-bearing surface is smooth, becoming slightly furrowed. Fruit bodies become thin, black, and shining when dry, resembling patches of dried tar.

=== Microscopic characters ===
The microscopic characters are typical of the genus Exidia. The basidia are ellipsoid and septate. The spores are cylindrical and allantoid (sausage-shaped), 11 to 18 by 4 to 6.5 μm.

=== Similar species ===
Fruit bodies of Exidia pithya can also occur on conifers and are similarly coloured, but typically have small spines or warts on the surface. Fruit bodies of Ulocolla saccharina and E. umbrinella also occur on conifers, but are brown to orange-brown.

== Habitat and distribution ==
Exidia friesiana is a wood-rotting species, found on dead conifer branches. It was originally described from spruce, but is also known from fir (Abies species) and pine {Pinus species). It is widely distributed throughout continental Europe, but is absent from the British Isles.
