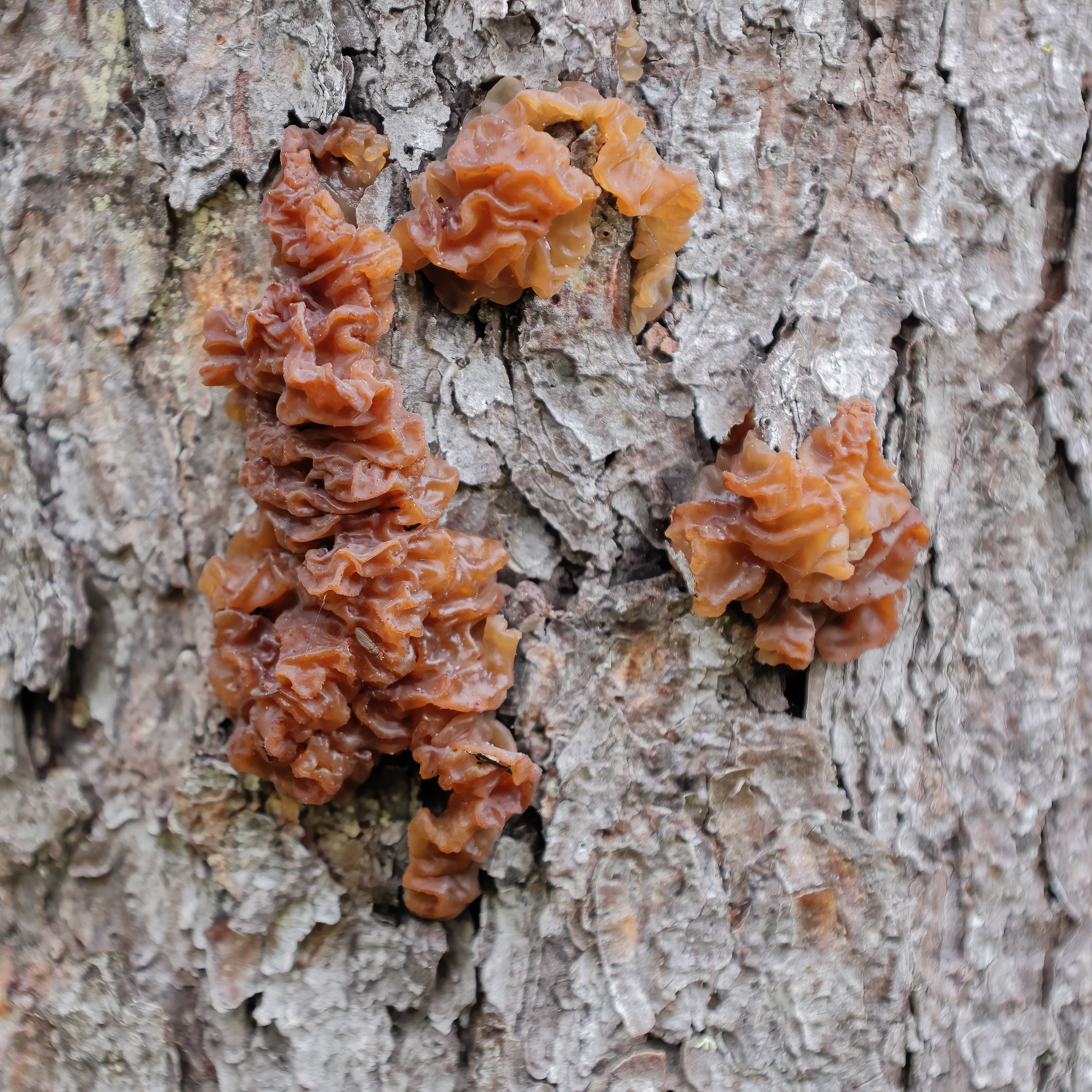
- Ulocolla pinicola on pine, Canada

Scientific classification
- Kingdom: Fungi
- Division: Basidiomycota
- Class: Agaricomycetes
- Order: Auriculariales
- Family: Auriculariaceae
- Genus: Ulocolla
- Species: U. pinicola

Binomial name
- Ulocolla pinicola (Peck) Spirin (2026)

Synonyms
- Tremella pinicola Peck (1886); Exidia pinicola (Peck) Coker (1920)

= Ulocolla pinicola =

Species of fungus

Ulocolla pinicola is a species of fungus in the family Auriculariaceae. Basidiocarps (fruit bodies) are gelatinous, reddish brown, button-shaped at first then often coalescing and becoming irregularly effused. It is a saprotroph, growing on dead branches of pine and other conifers in North America.

== Taxonomy ==
The species was first described in 1886 from New York as Tremella pinicola by mycologist Charles Horton Peck and placed in Exidia by William Chambers Coker in 1920. Recent molecular research, based on cladistic analysis of DNA sequences, has shown that the species belongs in a clade distinct from Exidia and is referable to the genus Ulocolla.

== Description ==
The basidiocarps of U. pinicola are yellowish to reddish brown, gelatinous, button-shaped at first but later coalescing to form effused, irregular, often brain-like or foliaceous masses up to 5 cm across and 2 cm thick. The surface is smooth.

=== Microscopic characters ===
The translucent hyphae are 1.0–6.5 μm in diameter, monomitic, branched, thin-walled, and form clamp connections. Hyphae frequently form anastomoses. Basidia are typically 13.5 to 19 μm long, elliptical, and consist of four longitudinally septate cells. Basidiospores are allantoid (sausage shaped), 9 to 13 by 3.5 to 5 μm, with thin, smooth walls.

=== Similar species ===
Specimens have generally been referred to Exidia saccharina (Ulocolla saccharina) until recently, but the latter species is only known from Europe. In North America, Exidia crenata produces fruit bodies of similar colour, but occurs on broadleaf trees.
