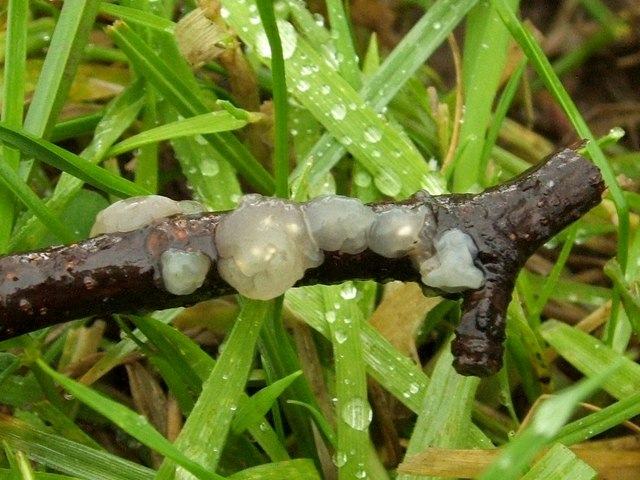
- In Scotland

Scientific classification
- Kingdom: Fungi
- Division: Basidiomycota
- Class: Agaricomycetes
- Order: Auriculariales
- Family: Hyaloriaceae
- Genus: Myxarium
- Species: M. nucleatum

Binomial name
- Myxarium nucleatum Wallr. (1833)

Synonyms
- List: Tremella nucleata Schwein. (1822); Naematelia nucleata (Schwein.) Fr. (1822); Exidia nucleata (Schwein.) Burt (1921); Tremella gemmata Lév. (1842); Naematelia gemmata (Lév.) Fr. (1874); Exidia gemmata (Lév.) Bourdot & Maire (1920); Naematelia atrata Peck (1872); Myxarium atratum (Peck) Ginns & M.N.L. Lefebvre (1993); Exidia alboglobosa Lloyd (1925); Exidia tremelloides L.S. Olive (1951); Myxarium tremelloides (L.S. Olive) Wojewoda (1981)

= Myxarium nucleatum =

Species of fungus

Myxarium nucleatum is a species of fungus in the family Hyaloriaceae. In the UK, it has been given the recommended English name of crystal brain. The fruit bodies are watery white, pustular or lobed, and gelatinous with small, white, mineral inclusions visible to the naked eye. It is a common, wood-rotting species in Europe, typically growing on dead attached or fallen branches of broadleaf trees. It is currently not clear whether collections from North America (where it is called granular jelly roll) and elsewhere represent the same species.

== Taxonomy ==
=== History ===
The species was originally described by Karl Friedrich Wilhelm Wallroth in 1833, who found it growing on hawthorn in Germany. He placed it in his new genus Myxarium based on its visible white inclusions which he interpreted as spores. Wallroth noted its similarity to Tremella nucleata, but nonetheless described Myxarium nucleatum as a new and separate species, using the same epithet.

Lewis David von Schweinitz had previously described Tremella nucleata from the United States, a species that was later transferred to the genus Exidia by Burt. Many subsequent publications, summarized by Donk (1966) and Reid (1970), discussed whether the European Myxarium nucleatum is conspecific with the American Exidia nucleata. The consensus, based on morphological similarity, was that they are the same.

=== Current status ===
Molecular research, based on cladistic analysis of DNA sequences, has indicated that M. nucleatum belongs in a clade separate from Exidia. Furthermore, at least three similar species of Myxarium occur in northern Europe, with a single American collection appearing distinct.

== Description ==
Myxarium nucleatum forms scattered, pustular, gelatinous fruit bodies 2 to 20 millimetres (1/8 to 3/4 inch) in diameter. These often coalesce, forming compound fruit bodies that may be irregularly cerebriform (brain-like) and up to 6 centimetres (2 1/4 in) across. Fruit bodies are hyaline (colourless) to whitish, occasionally with yellowish tints. Opaque, white, spherical, mineral inclusions are visible with the naked eye and are made of calcium oxalate. The spore-bearing surface (hymenium) is smooth. With age, the fruit bodies may become brownish and eventually dry to a thin, varnish-like film. The spore print is white.

=== Microscopic characters ===
The basidia are ellipsoid, longitudinally septate, and measure 10.5–13 × 8–10.5 μm, with a stalk cell up to 30 μm long that becomes enucleate on maturity. The spores are allantoid (sausage-shaped), measuring 8–14 × 3.5–5.5 μm. Hyphae are produced in a gelatinous matrix and are clamped, hyaline, and 1 to 3.5 μm wide.

=== Similar species ===
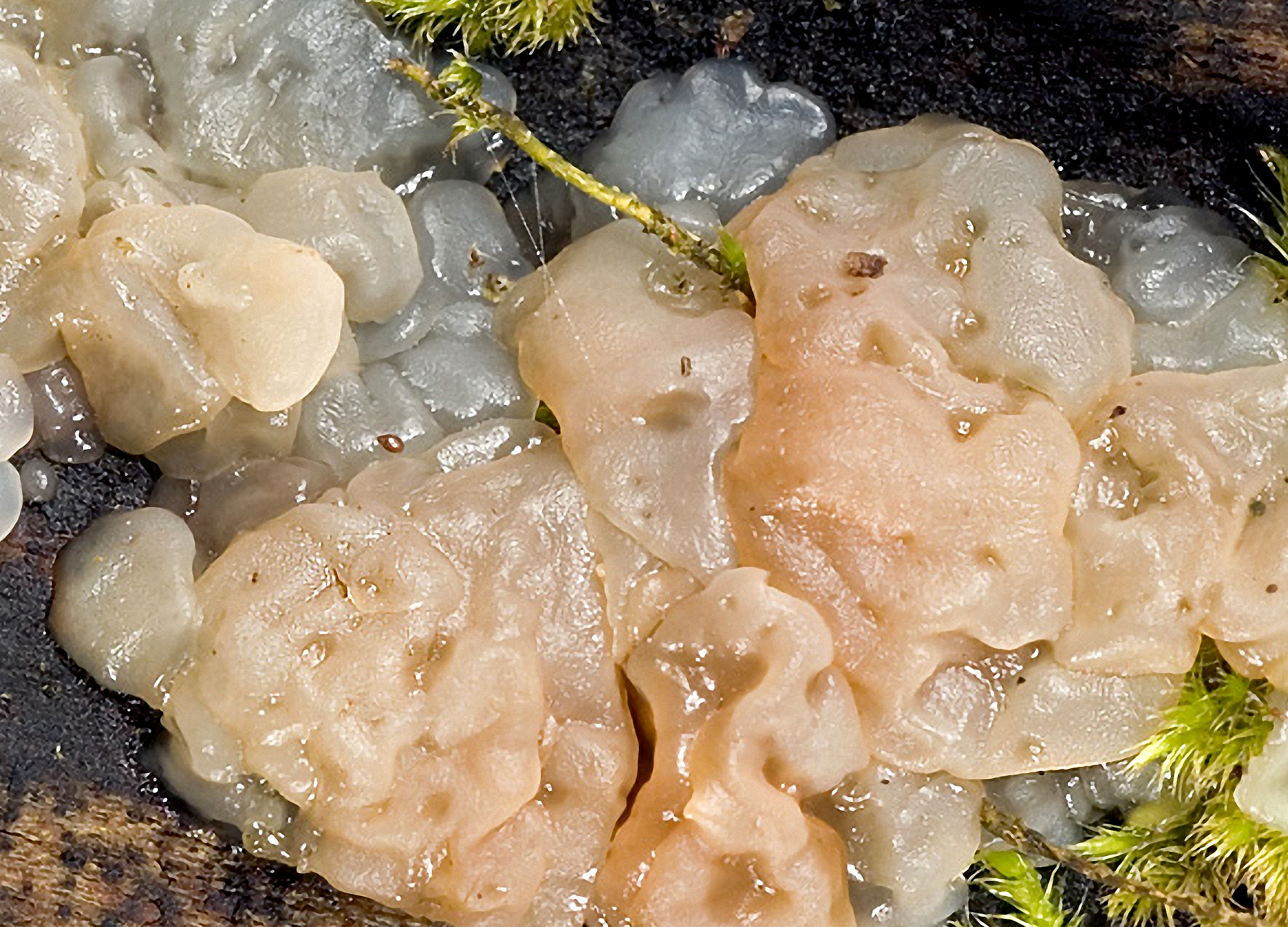
Exidia thuretiana is a lookalike species.

In Europe, Myxarium hyalinum (formerly considered synonymous with M. nucleatum) is very similar. Its fruit bodies tend to be more ochraceous or brownish with mineral inclusions less evident, except in older, coalesced specimens. Microscopically, it has slightly larger basidiospores, 9–16.5 x 4–6 μm. M. populinum is known from poplar and willow in northern Europe, and lacks mineral inclusions visible with the naked eye. M. cinnamomescens is another, similar northern species, also lacking mineral inclusions.

Fruit bodies of Exidia thuretiana are similarly coloured, but are typically more opaque and often appear pleated. They do not (or very rarely) contain white, granular inclusions. Microscopically, E. thuretiana can easily be distinguished by its sessile (not stalked) basidia. Fruit bodies of several gelatinous Tremella species may also appear similar, but never contain granular inclusions. All can be distinguished microscopically by their non-allantoid spores.

Ductifera pululahuana, Exidia repanda, E. saccharina, and Naematelia encephala are also similar.

== Distribution and habitat ==
Myxarium nucleatum typically fruits in autumn and winter. In its current, wide sense it is distributed in Europe, North, Central and South America, and New Zealand.

The species is often found in association with old pyrenomycetes, but is presumed to be a wood-rotting species, typically found on dead attached or fallen branches. It was originally recorded on hawthorn, but is also known from many other broadleaf trees and shrubs, including beech, ash, sycamore, and ivy.

== Ecology ==
In Europe, the fruit bodies can serve as host to the parasite Zygogloea gemellipara. This fungus has "auricularioid" basidia (more or less cylindrical basidia with lateral septa) and forms thin thread-like hyphae in the hymenium of its host. The hyphae of the parasite attach to the host hyphae through twisting, tendril-like haustorial cells.
