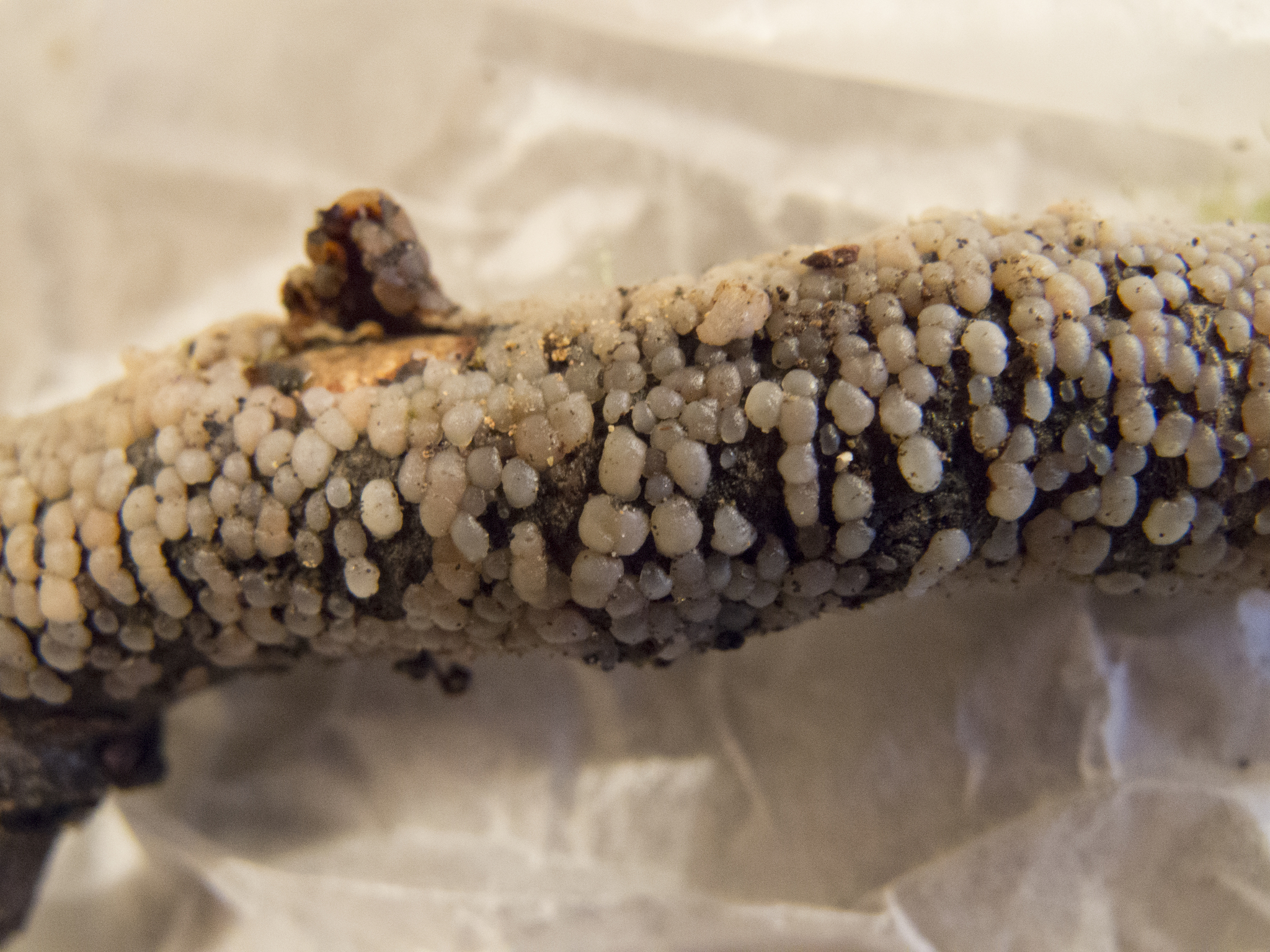
- Exidia nothofagi the former type species of Pseudostypella

Scientific classification
- Domain: Eukaryota
- Kingdom: Fungi
- Division: Basidiomycota
- Class: Agaricomycetes
- Order: Auriculariales
- Family: Exidiaceae
- Genus: Pseudostypella; McNabb (1969)

Type species
- Pseudostypella nothofagi McNabb (1969)

Species
- None

= Pseudostypella =

Obsolete genus of fungi

Pseudostypella is an obsolete fungal genus in the family Exidiaceae. The genus previously contained two species: Pseudostypella nothofagi found in New Zealand, and Pseudostypella translucens. However, both have been moved to other genera. P. nothofagi is now Exidia nothofagi, and P. translucens is now Phaeotremella translucens.
