= Adustochaete =

Scientific classification
- Kingdom: Fungi
- Division: Basidiomycota
- Class: Agaricomycetes
- Order: Auriculariales
- Family: Auriculariaceae
- Genus: Adustochaete; Alvarenga & K.H. Larss. (2019)

Type species
- Adustochaete rava Alvarenga & K.H. Larss. (2019)

Species
- Adustochaete interrupta; Adustochaete nivea; Adustochaete yunnanensis

Genus of fungi

Adustochaete is a genus of fungi in the family Auriculariaceae. Species produce effused basidiocarps (fruit bodies) on wood, typically covered in small sterile spines or pegs. The genus was created as a result of molecular research, based on cladistic analysis of DNA sequences, to accommodate two species from Brazil and Mexico that are not closely related to the older and superficially similar genus Heterochaete. Two additional species, from Brazil and China, have since been described.
