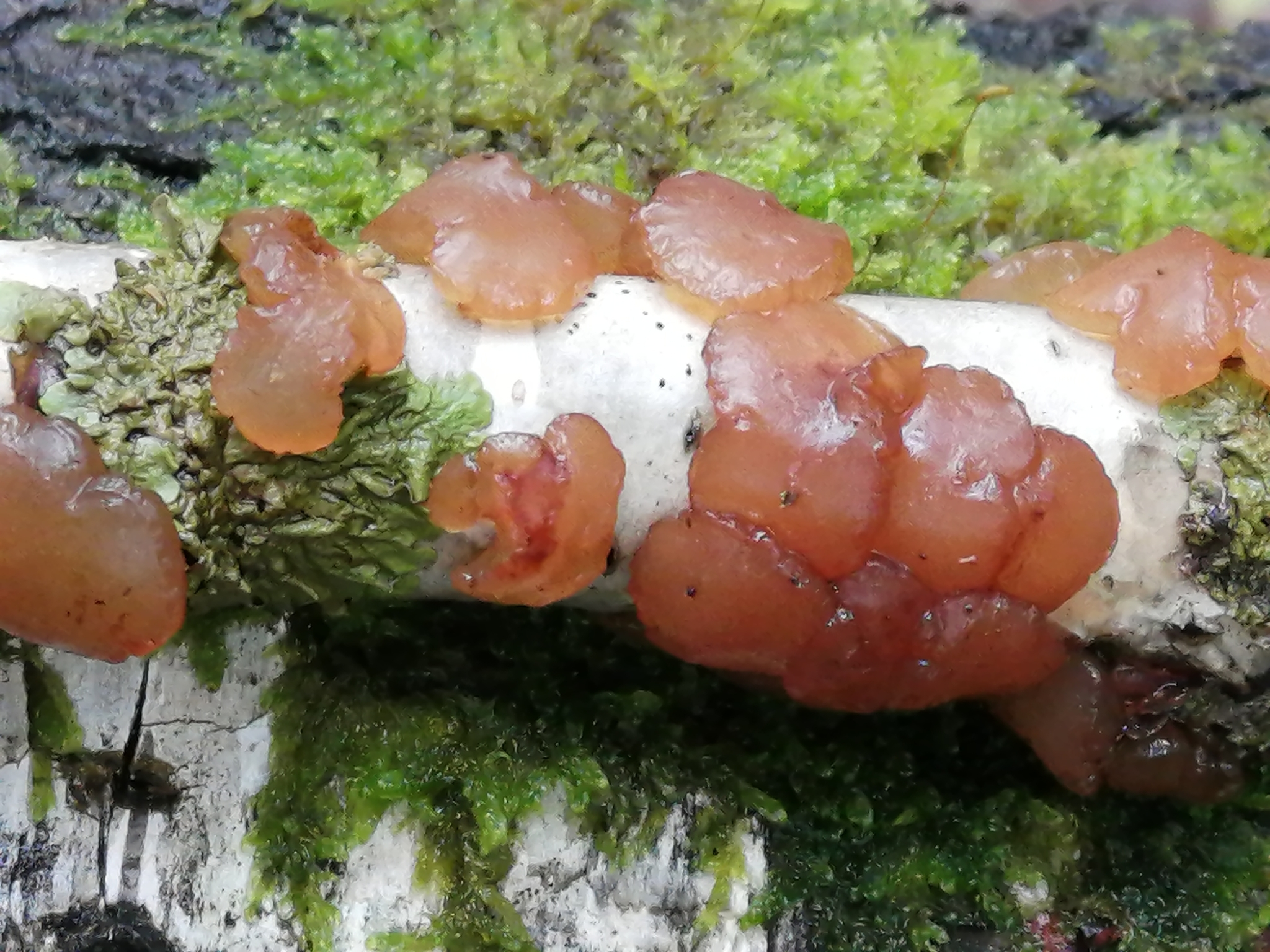

Scientific classification
- Kingdom: Fungi
- Division: Basidiomycota
- Class: Agaricomycetes
- Order: Auriculariales
- Family: Auriculariaceae
- Genus: Descidia
- Species: D. repanda

Binomial name
- Descidia repanda (Fr.) Spirin (2026)

Synonyms
- Exidia repanda Fr. (1822); Tremella repanda (Fr.) Spreng. (1827); Ulocolla repanda (Fr.) Bres. (1932); Exidia qinghaiensis S.R. Wang & Thorn (2021)

= Descidia repanda =

Species of fungus

Descidia repanda, also known as birch jelly, is a species of fungus in the family Auriculariaceae. Basidiocarps (fruit bodies) are gelatinous, orange-brown, and button-shaped. It grows on dead attached twigs and branches of birch (Betula species) and has been recorded from Europe and northern Asia.

== Taxonomy ==
The species was originally described from Sweden in 1822 as Exidia repanda by mycologist Elias Magnus Fries. Molecular research, based on cladistic analysis of DNA sequences, has shown that the species does not belong in Exidia sensu stricto but should be placed in the newly described genus Descidia.

== Description ==
Descidia repanda forms reddish brown, gelatinous fruit bodies that are firm and button-shaped, around 3 cm across. The fruit bodies typically grow gregariously, but do not normally coalesce. The upper, spore-bearing surface is smooth and shiny, whilst the undersurface is smooth and matt. Fruit bodies are attached to the wood at a point, but do not have a stem. The spore print is white.

=== Microscopic characters ===
The microscopic characters are typical of the genus Exidia. The basidia are ellipsoid, septate, 12.5 to 15 by 7.5 to 10 μm. The spores are allantoid (sausage-shaped), 12 to 14 by 2.5 to 3.5 μm.

=== Similar species ===
Fruit bodies of Exidia recisa are similarly coloured, but are conical, pendulous, and typically occur on willow (Salix spp). Fruit bodies of E. umbrinella are also similar, but the species only occurs on conifers and is uncommon. In North America, E. crenata is similar, but has conical to pendulous fruit bodies and typically occurs on oak. The widespread E. glandulosa has much darker, blackish brown fruit bodies with sparse warts or small, peg-like projections on their surface.

== Habitat and distribution ==
Descidia repanda is a wood-rotting species found on dead twigs and branches of birch. It is widely distributed in Europe and has also been reported from China, Japan, and the Russian Far East. It is not known to occur in North America.
