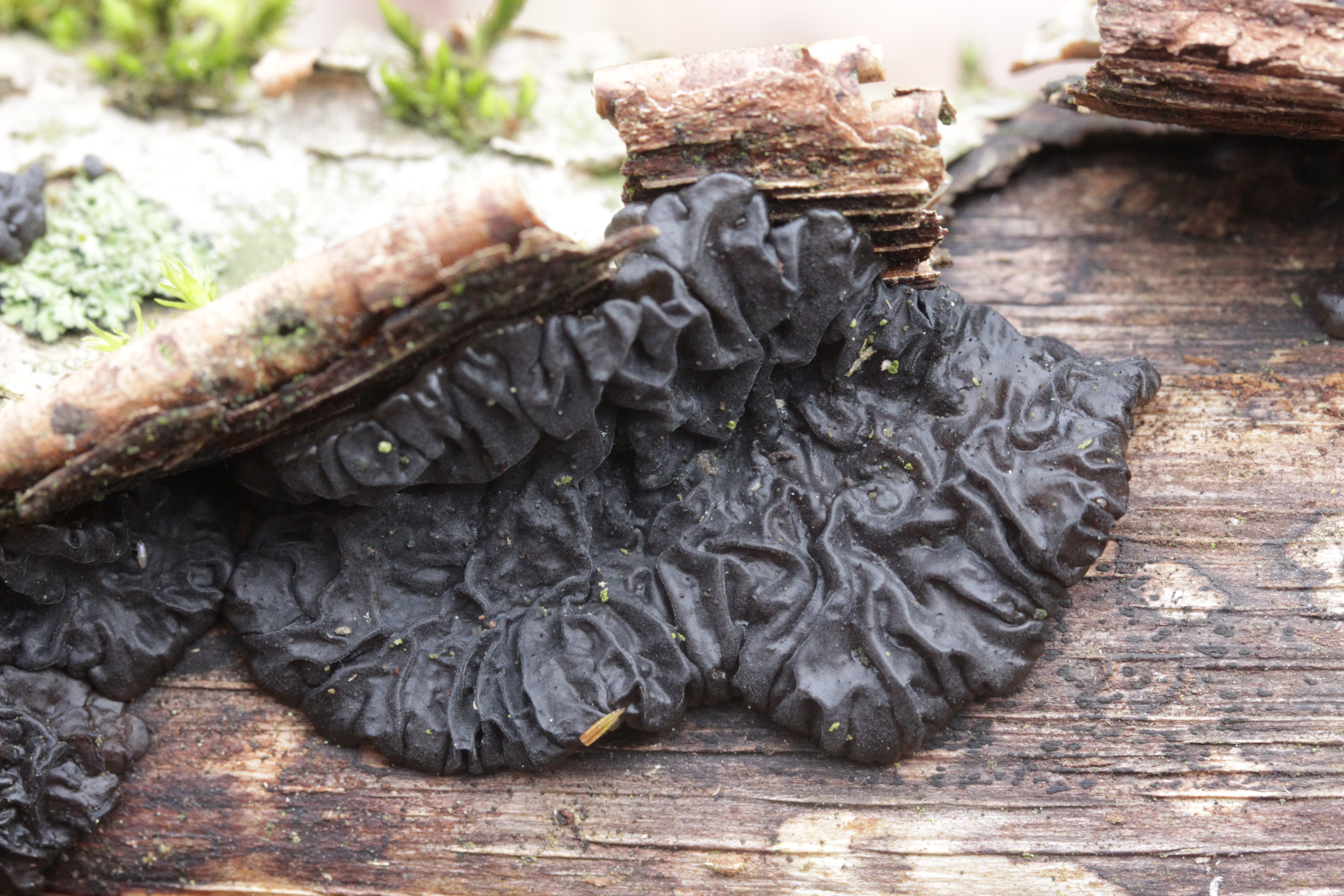

Scientific classification
- Kingdom: Fungi
- Division: Basidiomycota
- Class: Agaricomycetes
- Order: Auriculariales
- Family: Auriculariaceae
- Genus: Exidia
- Species: E. pithya

Binomial name
- Exidia pithya Fr. (1822)

Synonyms
- Tremella nigricans With. (1776); Exidia nigricans (With.) P. Roberts (2009); Exidia plana Donk (1966)

= Exidia pithya =

Species of fungus

Exidia pithya is a species of fungus in the family Auriculariaceae. In the UK, it has the recommended English name of warlock's butter. It produces black, gelatinous basidiocarps (fruit bodies) and is a common, wood-rotting species in Europe, typically growing on dead attached branches of broadleaf trees, more rarely conifers. It was formerly known as Exidia nigricans and has been much confused with Exidia friesiana.

== Taxonomy ==
The species was originally found growing on pine and was described in 1822 by the Swedish mycologist Elias Magnus Fries. The name was subsequently applied to all similarly coloured Exidia species growing on conifers in Europe.

Tremella nigricans was described from England by Withering in 1776, based on a phrase name published by Dillenius in 1741. It was subsequently considered a synonym of Exidia glandulosa, until Donk revised species concepts in 1966 and placed it in synonymy with E. plana.

A revision of the genus Exidia has shown that two similar species occur on conifers in Europe: Exidia friesiana, with a smooth surface, is restricted to conifers, whilst E. pithya (synonym E. nigricans), characterized by Fries as having a papillate surface (with small spines or projections), occurs infrequently on conifers and more typically on broadleaf trees.

=== Common name ===
Both Dillenius (1741) and Withering (1776) gave the English name for Exidia nigricans as "Witches' butter", though this name has subsequently also been applied to other gelatinous fungi, including E. glandulosa and the yellow Tremella mesenterica. It is said to be based on a folk belief that witches milk cows at night and scatter the butter they create in the process around.

== Description ==
Exidia pithya forms dark sepia to blackish, rubbery-gelatinous fruit bodies that are button-shaped at first and up to 5 centimetres (2 inches) across. The fruitbodies occur in groups and coalesce to form effused, irregular masses up to 30 cm (12 in) across. The upper, spore-bearing surface becomes irregularly folded, shiny, and dotted with small pimples or pegs. The individual fruitbodies are each attached to the wood at the base.

=== Microscopic characters ===
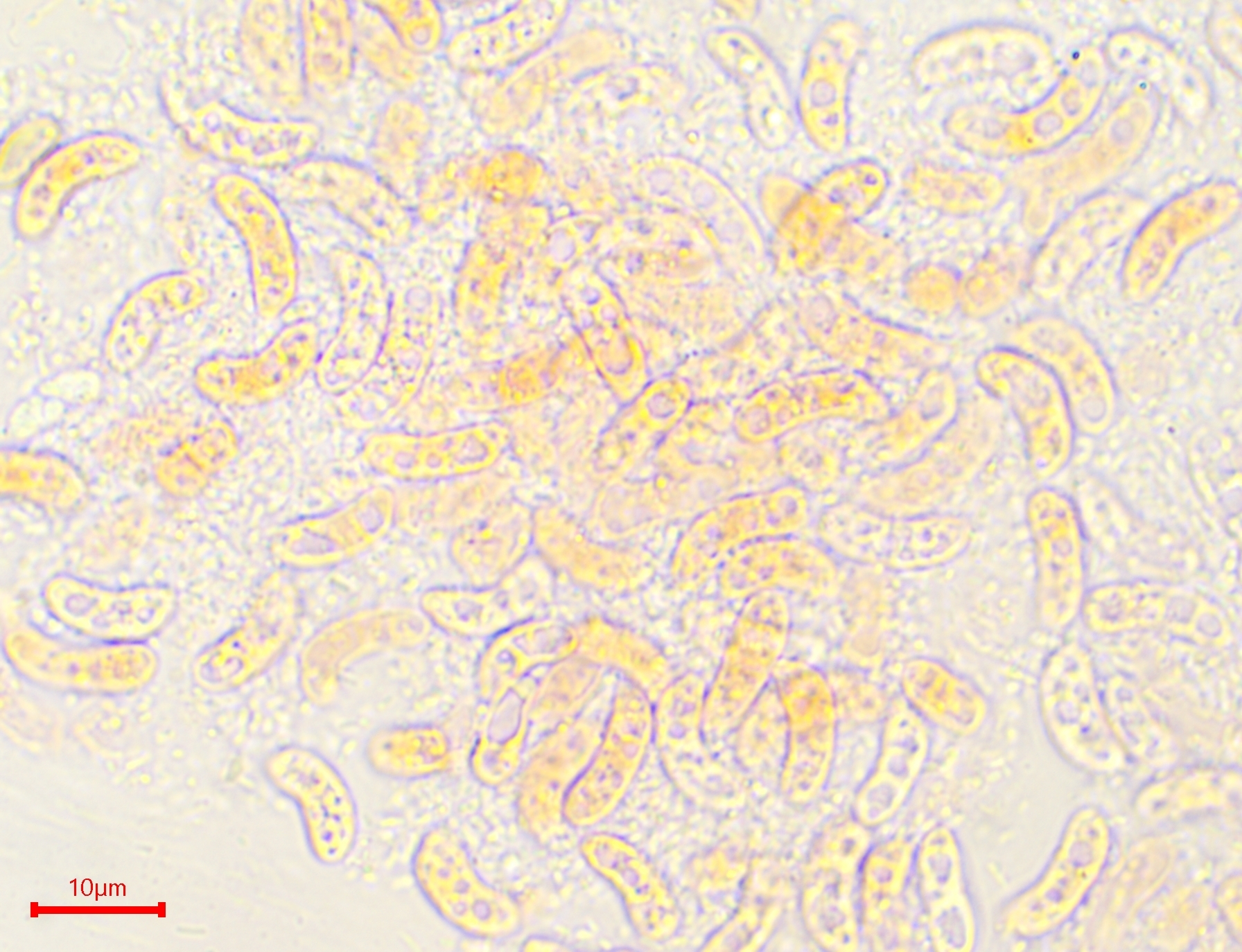
Sausage-shaped spores

The microscopic characters are typical of the genus Exidia. The basidia are ellipsoid, septate, 11–20 × 8–12 μm. The spores are cylindrical, allantoid (sausage-shaped), 8–16.5 × 3–5.5 μm.

=== Similar species ===
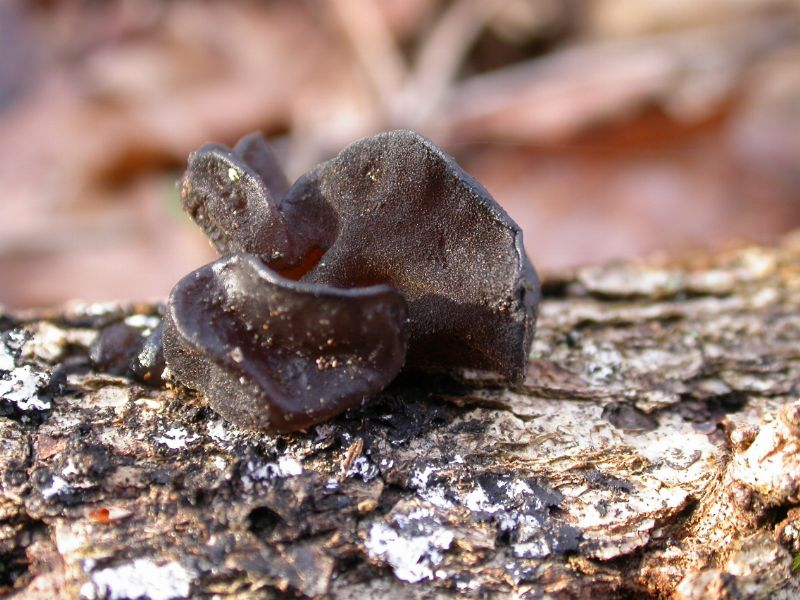
Exidia glandulosa

On conifers, Exidia friesiana is very similar, but has a smooth surface without small pimples or pegs. On broadleaf trees, Exidia spiculata is similar, but also has a smooth surface. Exidia glandulosa and Exidia truncata are frequently confused with E. pithya but produce discrete, top-shaped fruitbodies that rarely if ever coalesce.

== Habitat and distribution ==
Exidia pithya is a wood-rotting species, typically found on dead attached branches of a wide range of broadleaf trees and, less frequently, conifers. It persists for some while on fallen branches and logs. It is widely distributed in Europe, but its presence in North America is uncertain.
