= Exidia spiculata =

Scientific classification
- Kingdom: Fungi
- Division: Basidiomycota
- Class: Agaricomycetes
- Order: Auriculariales
- Family: Auriculariaceae
- Genus: Exidia
- Species: E. spiculata

Binomial name
- Exidia spiculata Schwein. (1832)

Synonyms
- Exidia glandulosa f. populi Neuhoff (1936); Exidia inflata Cazenave & G. Gruhn (2024)

Species of fungus

Exidia spiculata is a species of fungus in the family Auriculariaceae. The gelatinous basidiocarps (fruit bodies) are blackish and button-shaped, coalescing with age. It is a wood-rotting fungus found in North America and northern Eurasia, growing on dead attached branches of broadleaf trees. The species has recently been distinguished from the very similar Exidia pithya (formerly E. nigricans).

== Taxonomy ==
The species was originally described from Pennsylvania in 1832 by the German-American mycologist Lewis David de Schweinitz. The name was synonymised by Neuhoff with Exidia glandulosa which he characterized as a coalescing species on broadleaf trees. A revision by Donk re-interpreted Exidia glandulosa as a turbinate species, renaming E. glandulosa sensu Neuhoff as Exidia plana (later E. nigricans, now Exidia pithya).

Recent molecular research, based on cladistic analysis of DNA sequences, has shown that two blackish, coalescing species occur on broadleaf trees in Europe and North America: Exidia pithya, with occasional papillae or small pegs on the upper surface; and E. spiculata, with an entirely smooth surface.

== Description ==
Exidia spiculata forms dark sepia to blackish, rubbery-gelatinous fruit bodies that are button-shaped at first, later coalescing to form compound fruit bodies up to 4cm across. The upper, spore-bearing surface becomes irregularly folded, shiny, smooth, but occasionally (when old) dotted with white mineral inclusions. The undersurface is smooth, more rarely finely punctate.

=== Microscopic characters ===
The microscopic characters are typical of the genus Exidia. The basidia are ellipsoid, septate, 10–14 × 7–10.5 μm. The spores are cylindrical, allantoid (sausage-shaped), 10–15.5 × 3–4 μm.

=== Similar species ===
Exidia pithya is very similar, but typically has scattered, spine or peg-like projections on its upper surface, never has mineral inclusions, and, when coalesced, can be much larger, up to 30cm across. Microscopically, its spores are slightly wider (up to 5.5 μm across).

== Habitat and distribution ==
Exidia spiculata is a wood-rotting species, found on dead attached or recently fallen branches of broadleaf trees. It is known from Canada and the northern USA, Europe (mainly Scandinavia), and northern Asia (Russia).
