= Exidia umbrinella =

Scientific classification
- Domain: Eukaryota
- Kingdom: Fungi
- Division: Basidiomycota
- Class: Agaricomycetes
- Order: Auriculariales
- Family: Auriculariaceae
- Genus: Exidia
- Species: E. umbrinella

Binomial name
- Exidia umbrinella Bres. (1900)

Species of fungus

Exidia umbrinella is a species of fungus in the family Auriculariaceae. Basidiocarps (fruit bodies) are gelatinous, orange-brown, and turbinate (top-shaped). It grows on dead attached twigs and branches of conifers in Europe.

== Taxonomy ==
The species was originally found growing on larch and fir in Hungary and Italy and was described in 1900 by Italian mycologist Giacomo Bresadola.

== Description ==
Exidia umbrinella forms yellowish to reddish brown, gelatinous fruit bodies that are button-shaped at first, becoming more pendulous with age, and around 2.5 cm (1 in) across. The fruit bodies typically grow gregariously, but do not normally coalesce. The upper, spore-bearing surface is smooth becoming slightly furrowed. Fruit bodies are attached to the wood at a point, sometimes with a short stem. The spore print is white.

=== Microscopic characters ===
The microscopic characters are typical of the genus Exidia. The basidia are ellipsoid and septate. The spores are weakly allantoid (sausage-shaped), 11 to 18 by 3 to 5 μm.

=== Similar species ===
Fruit bodies of Exidia repanda and E. recisa are similar, but occur on broad leaved trees. Fruit bodies of E. saccharina are similarly coloured and occur on conifers, but typically coalesce to form large, irregular clumps.

== Habitat and distribution ==
Exidia umbrinella is a wood-rotting species, typically found on dead attached twigs and branches. It was originally described from fir (Abies species) and larch (Larix species), but has also been reported on spruce and pine (Picea and Pinus species). It has been recorded from Andorra, Austria, France, Germany, Hungary, Italy, Liechtenstein, North Macedonia, Poland, and Ukraine.
