= Exidia alveolata =

Scientific classification
- Kingdom: Fungi
- Division: Basidiomycota
- Class: Agaricomycetes
- Order: Auriculariales
- Family: Auriculariaceae
- Genus: Exidia
- Species: E. alveolata

Binomial name
- Exidia alveolata Pat. (1893)

Species of fungus

Exidia alveolata is a species of fungus in the family Auriculariaceae. Basidiocarps (fruit bodies) are gelatinous, pale smoky brown, alveolate (shallowly pitted like a honeycomb), and with sparse pegs or spicules on the surface. The species is currently known only from its original collection in Ecuador.

== Description ==
Exidia alveolata forms smoky brown, gelatinous fruit bodies that are effused and alveolate, around 4 centimetres (1 1/2 in) across. Small hyphal pegs or spicules are scattered on the surface.

=== Microscopic characters ===
The microscopic characters are typical of the genus Exidia. The basidia are ellipsoid, septate, 14 to 17 by 10 to 12.5 μm. The spores are weakly allantoid (sausage-shaped), 10.5 to 16 by 4 to 6 μm.
