= Exidia aeruginosa =

Scientific classification
- Kingdom: Fungi
- Division: Basidiomycota
- Class: Agaricomycetes
- Order: Auriculariales
- Family: Auriculariaceae
- Genus: Exidia
- Species: E. aeruginosa

Binomial name
- Exidia aeruginosa P. Roberts

Species of fungus

Exidia aeruginosa is a species of fungus in the family Auriculariaceae. Basidiocarps (fruit bodies) are gelatinous, brown to bluish green, and occur on twigs. The species is currently known only from Jamaica.
