= Exidia purpureocinerea =

Scientific classification
- Kingdom: Fungi
- Division: Basidiomycota
- Class: Agaricomycetes
- Order: Auriculariales
- Family: Auriculariaceae
- Genus: Exidia
- Species: E. purpureocinerea

Binomial name
- Exidia purpureocinerea MacOwan (1882)

Species of fungus

Exidia purpureocinerea is a species of fungus in the family Auriculariaceae. Basidiocarps (fruit bodies) are gelatinous, densely covered in small spines, purple-grey, and cushioned-shaped at first, becoming effused. The species occurs in southern Africa on dead wood.

== Taxonomy ==
The species was originally described from Boschberg (in the Sneeuberge) in 1882 by Yorkshire-born, South African botanist and mycologist Peter MacOwan.

== Description ==
Exidia purpureocinerea forms purple-grey, gelatinous fruit bodies that are cushion-shaped at first, later coalescing to become irregularly effused. The surface is densely covered in small spines. The spore print is white.

=== Microscopic characters ===
The microscopic characters are typical of the genus Exidia. The basidia are ellipsoid, septate, 14 to 18 by 10.5 to 12 μm. The spores are weakly allantoid (sausage-shaped), 14 to 18 by 4.5 to 5.5 μm.

=== Similar species ===
The original description notes that Exidia purpureocinerea is similar to E. glandulosa, but differs in its colour and denser smaller papillae (spines). The densely spiny, coalescing fruit bodies are typical of the genus Tremellochaete and the South African species resembles the New Zealand species Tremellochaete novozealandica.

== Habitat and distribution ==
Exidia purpureocinerea is a wood-rotting species. It is currently only known from South Africa.
