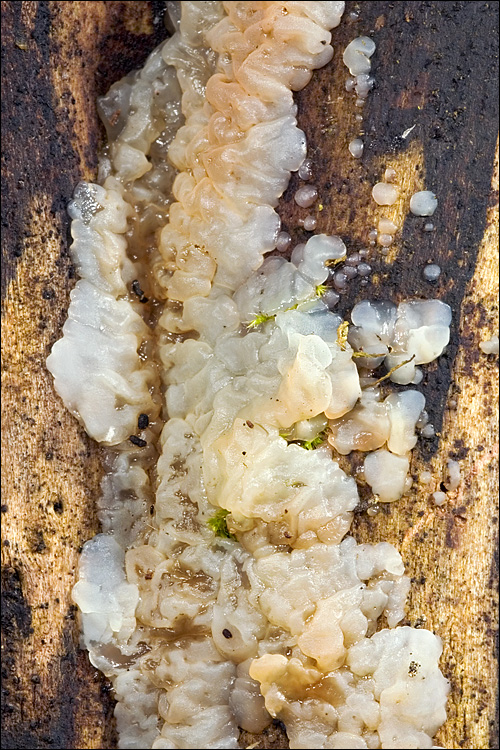

Scientific classification
- Kingdom: Fungi
- Division: Basidiomycota
- Class: Agaricomycetes
- Order: Auriculariales
- Family: Auriculariaceae
- Genus: Descidia
- Species: D. thuretiana

Binomial name
- Descidia thuretiana (Lév.) Spirin (2026)

Synonyms
- Tremella thuretiana Lév. (1848); Exidia thuretiana (Lév.) Fr. (1874)

= Descidia thuretiana =

Species of fungus

Descidia thuretiana (common name white brain) is a jelly fungus in the family Auriculariaceae. The fruit bodies are white and gelatinous with brain-like folds. It is a common, wood-rotting species in Europe, typically growing on dead attached or fallen branches of broadleaf trees, especially beech.

== Taxonomy ==
The species was originally found growing on beech in France and was described in 1848 by Joseph-Henri Léveillé as Tremella thuretiana. It was subsequently transferred to the genus Exidia by Fries in 1874.

Donk preferred the name Exidia albida (Huds.) Bref. for this species, but most later authors have followed Reid in considering E. albida a nomen dubium (name of uncertain application) that might originally have referred to any whitish or transparent jelly fungus.

Molecular research, based on cladistic analysis of DNA sequences, has shown that the species does not belong in Exidia sensu stricto but should be placed in the newly described genus Descidia.

The epithet "thuretiana" compliments botanist Gustave Thuret, owner of the Château de Rentilly, in the grounds of which E. thuretiana was first collected. The recommended English name is "white brain".

== Description ==
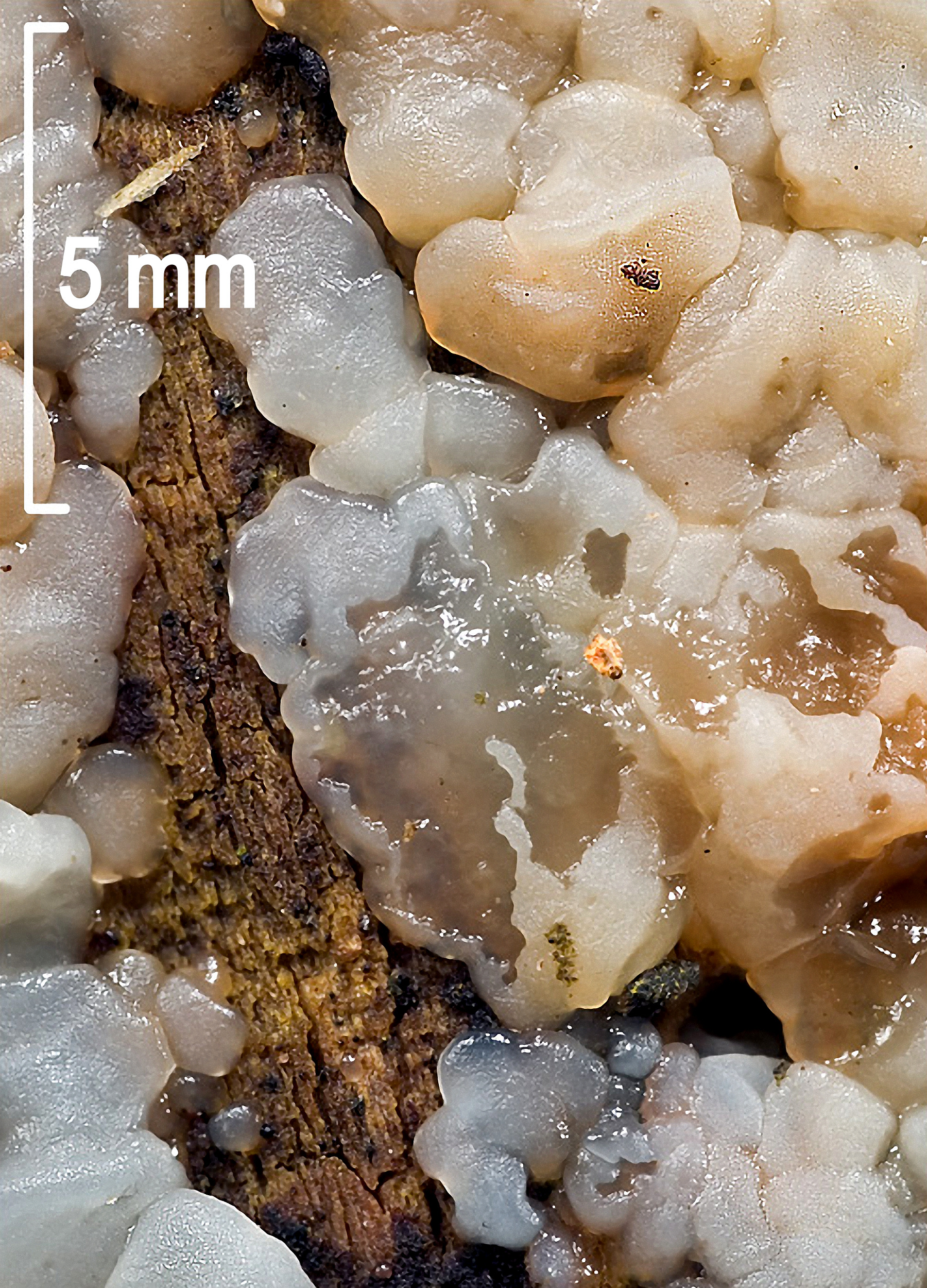
Fruit bodies are smooth, opaque, and gelatinous.

Descidia thuretiana forms shallowly pulvinate (cushion-shaped), gelatinous fruit bodies that individually measure up to 2 centimetres (3/4 inch) in diameter. The fruit bodies quickly coalesce, often running along the underside of branches and extending up to 30 cm (4 in). They typically appear undulating or pleated and are whitish, occasionally with grey or brown tints. The upper, spore-bearing surface (hymenium) is smooth and opaque, but is frequently furrowed and folded. It can have a pruinose (powder-like) coating. With age, the hymenium becomes a thin, horny, yellowish film. The spore print is white. The fungus does not have any distinct taste or odour.

=== Microscopic characters ===
The microscopic characters are typical of effused species in the genus Exidia. The basidia are ellipsoid, longitudinally septate, and measure 17–28 x 11–19 μm. The spores are allantoid (sausage-shaped), with dimensions of 12–20 x 5.5–8 μm. Hyphae have a diameter ranging from 0.5 to 6 μm.

=== Similar species ===
Fruit bodies of Myxarium nucleatum are similarly coloured, but are typically pustular or lobed (never appearing pleated) and usually contain conspicuous, white, granular inclusions. Microscopically Myxarium species can be distinguished by their stalked basidia.

== Habitat and distribution ==
Descidia thuretiana is a wood-rotting species, typically found on dead attached or fallen branches. It was originally recorded on beech and frequently occurs on this substrate, but is also known from other broadleaf trees and shrubs, including oak, hazel, ash, and apple. Descidia thuretiana typically fruits in autumn and winter. It is widely distributed in Europe, North Africa, and northern Asia. It has been collected from Greenland.
