= Fibulosebacea =

Scientific classification
- Kingdom: Fungi
- Division: Basidiomycota
- Class: Agaricomycetes
- Order: Auriculariales
- Family: Auriculariaceae
- Genus: Fibulosebacea; K. Wells & Raitv.

Type species
- Fibulosebacea strigosa (Bourdot & Galzin) K. Wells & Raitv.

Genus of fungi

Fibulosebacea is a genus of fungi in the family Auriculariaceae. The genus is monotypic, containing the single species Fibulosebacea strigosa, found in Europe.
