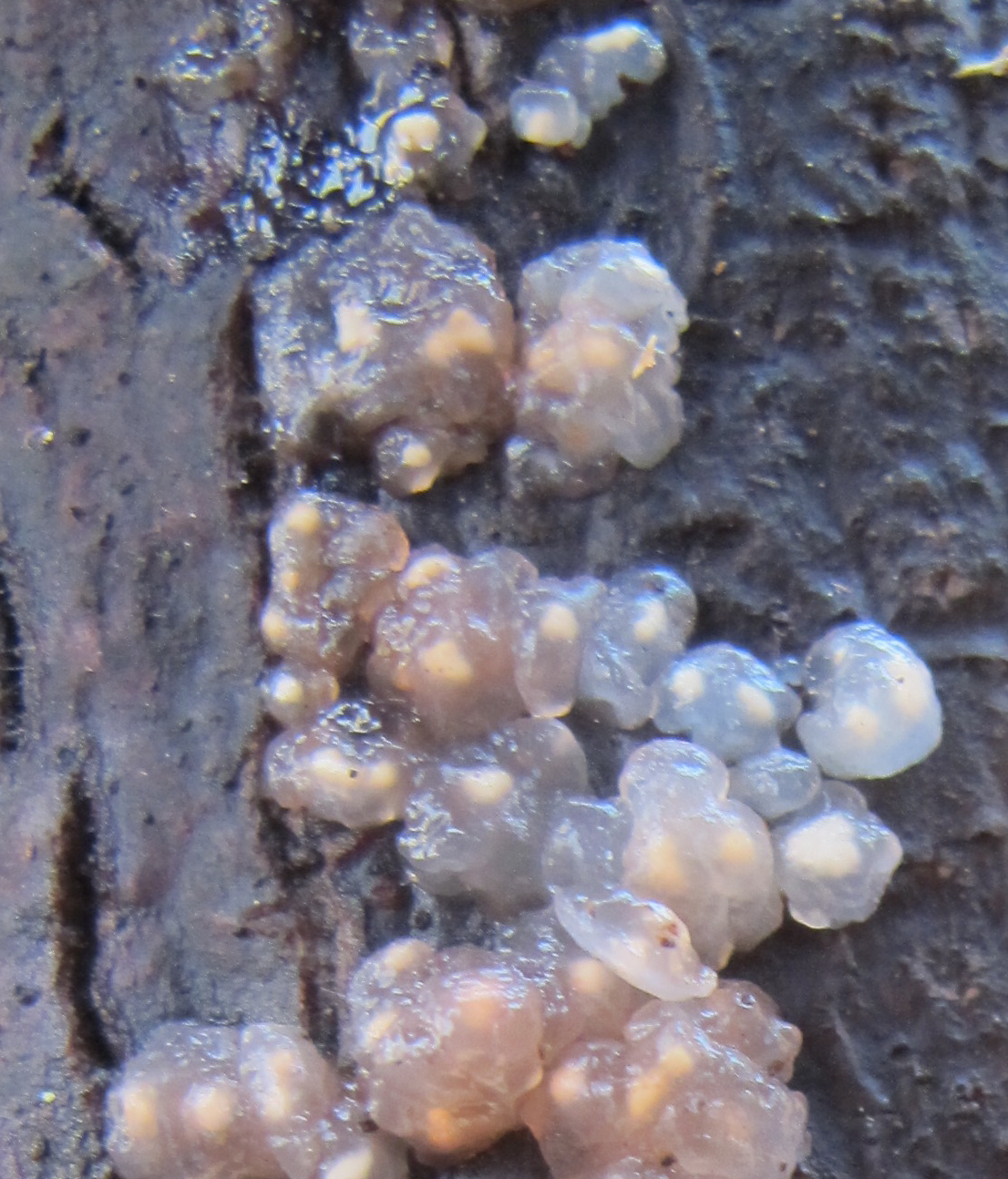
- Myxarium nucleatum, USA

Scientific classification
- Kingdom: Fungi
- Division: Basidiomycota
- Class: Agaricomycetes
- Order: Auriculariales
- Family: Hyaloriaceae
- Genus: Myxarium; Wallr. (1833)

Type species
- Myxarium nucleatum Wallr. (1833)

Species
- M. cirratulum M. corticale M. crozalcii M. crystallinum M. denticulatum M. evanidum M. frumentaceum M. fugacissimum M. grilletii M. guianense M. hyalinum M. inconspicuum M. legonii M. mesomorphum M. minutissimum M. mirabilis M. podlachicum M. populinum M. rotundum M. simile M. spiniferum M. varium

Synonyms
- Microsebacina P. Roberts (1993)

= Myxarium =

Genus of fungi

Myxarium is a genus of fungi in the family Hyaloriaceae. Basidiocarps (fruit bodies) are gelatinous and effused or pustular. The genus is cosmopolitan. All species grow on dead wood or dead herbaceous stems.

== Taxonomy ==
=== History ===
The genus was originally described by Karl Friedrich Wilhelm Wallroth in 1833 based on the visible white inclusions in the basidiocarps of the type species, Myxarium nucleatum, which he interpreted as spores (they are in fact crystals of calcium oxalate). The genus was synonymized with Exidia by subsequent authors, until revived by Dutch mycologist M.A. Donk in 1966. The revised concept of Myxarium emphasized the microscopic presence of septate basidia with enucleate stalk cells ("myxarioid" basidia), a feature absent in Exidia. Additional species were added to the genus on this basis.

=== Current status ===
Molecular research, based on cladistic analysis of DNA sequences, indicates that Myxarium is distinct from Exidia and forms a natural (monophyletic) group of species related to the type. Not all fungi with "myxarioid" basidia belong to the genus, however, and at least one species (M. fugacissimum) lacks such basidia.
