= Crystallodon =

Scientific classification
- Domain: Eukaryota
- Kingdom: Fungi
- Division: Basidiomycota
- Class: Agaricomycetes
- Order: Auriculariales
- Family: incertae sedis
- Genus: Crystallodon; Alvarenga (2021)
- Species: C. subgelatinosum

Binomial name
- Crystallodon subgelatinosum (Bodman) Alvarenga & Gibertoni (2021)

Genus of fungi

Crystallodon is a genus of fungi in the order Auriculariales. The type and only species, Crystallodon subgelatinosum, forms effused, gelatinous, basidiocarps (fruit bodies) covered with small, sterile spines on fallen wood. The species was formerly placed in Heterochaete, but molecular research, based on cladistic analysis of DNA sequences, indicates that Crystallodon is distinct. The species was originally described from Panama and has also been recorded from Brazil.
