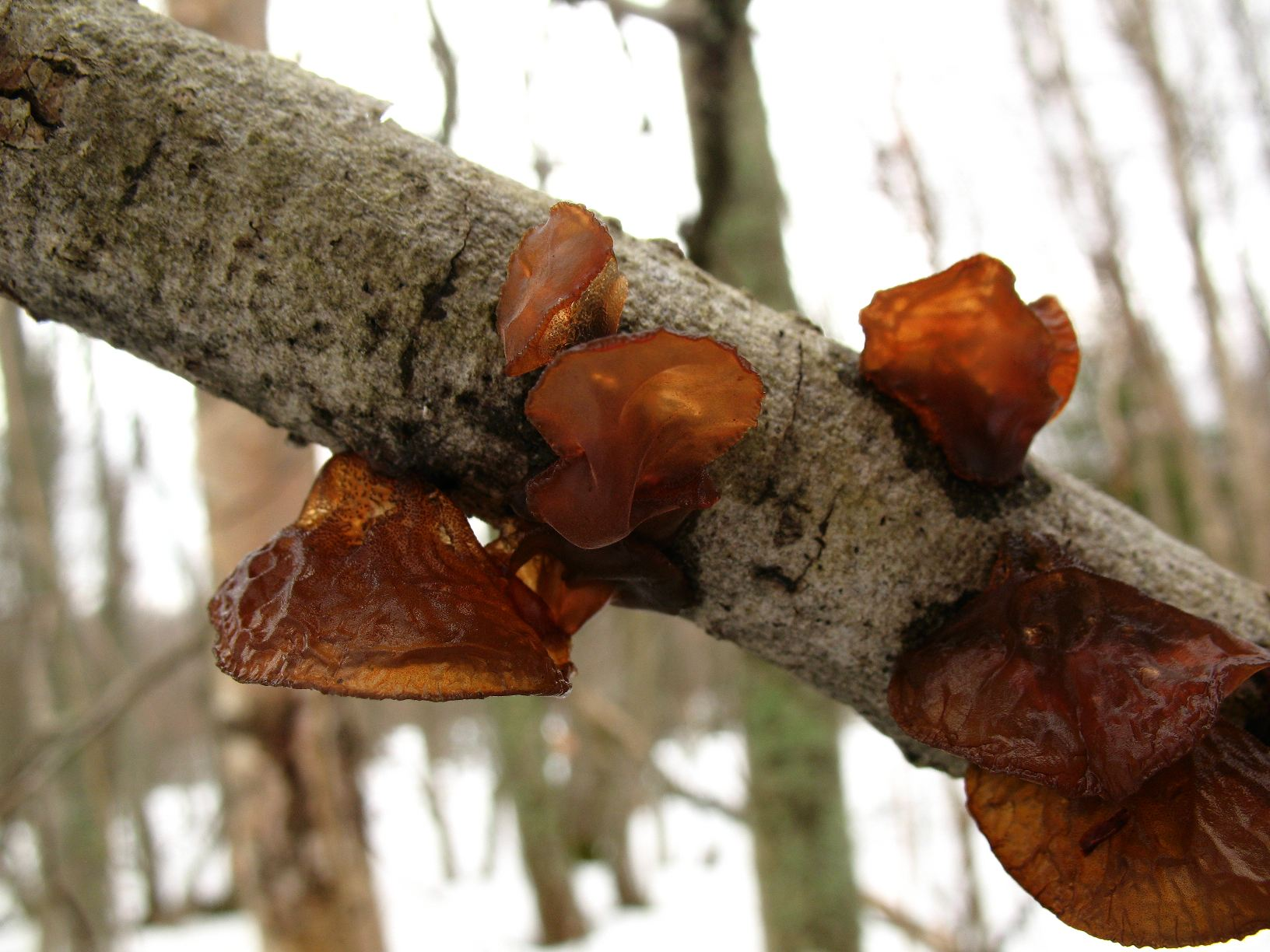

Scientific classification
- Kingdom: Fungi
- Division: Basidiomycota
- Class: Agaricomycetes
- Order: Auriculariales
- Family: Auriculariaceae
- Genus: Exidia
- Species: E. recisa

Binomial name
- Exidia recisa (Ditmar) Fr. (1822)

Synonyms
- Tremella recisa Ditmar (1813); Tremella salicum Pers. (1822)

= Exidia recisa =

Species of fungus

Exidia recisa is a species of fungus in the family Auriculariaceae. In the UK, it has the recommended English name of amber jelly. Basidiocarps (fruit bodies) are gelatinous, orange-brown, and turbinate (top-shaped). It typically grows on dead attached twigs and branches of willow and is found in Europe and possibly elsewhere, though it has long been confused with the North American Exidia crenata.

== Taxonomy ==
The species was originally found growing on willow in Germany and was described in 1813 by L.P.F. Ditmar as Tremella recisa. It was transferred to the genus Exidia by Fries in 1822. Tremella salicum (the epithet means "of willow") has long been considered a synonym.

Molecular research, based on cladistic analysis of DNA sequences, has shown that Exidia recisa is part of a complex of similar species, including Exidia crenata in North America and Exidia yadongensis in eastern Asia.

The epithet "recisa" means "cut-off", with reference to the shape of the fruit bodies.

== Description ==
Exidia recisa forms orange-brown or amber, gelatinous fruit bodies that are firm and shallowly conical at first, becoming lax and pendulous with age, and around 2.5 centimetres (1 in) across. The fruit bodies typically grow gregariously, but do not normally coalesce. The upper, spore-bearing surface is smooth and shiny, whilst the undersurface is smooth and matt. The fruit bodies attach to wood at a point, but do not have a stem. The spore print is white.

=== Microscopic characters ===
The microscopic characters are typical of the genus Exidia. The basidia are ellipsoid, septate, 8 to 15 by 6 to 10 μm. The spores are allantoid (sausage-shaped), 14 to 15 by 3 to 3.5 μm.

=== Similar species ===
In Europe, fruit bodies of Exidia repanda are similarly coloured and microscopically indistinguishable. The fruit bodies are button-shaped, however, never becoming conical and pendulous, and the species typically occurs on birch, never on willow. Fruit bodies of Exidia umbrinella are also similar, but the species only occurs on conifers and is uncommon. Exidia brunneola is also uncommon and occurs on poplar. The widespread E. glandulosa has much darker, blackish brown fruit bodies with sparse warts or small, peg-like projections on their surface.

== Habitat and distribution ==
Exidia recisa is a wood-rotting species, typically found on dead attached twigs and branches. It was originally recorded on willow and most frequently occurs on this substrate, although it has also been reported on alder, and Prunus species. Exidia recisa typically fruits in autumn and winter. It is widely distributed in Europe, but its distribution elsewhere is uncertain because it has only recently been distinguished from morphologically similar species in North America and Asia. Based on DNA sequencing, it is said to be present in North America as well as the more common E. crenata.
