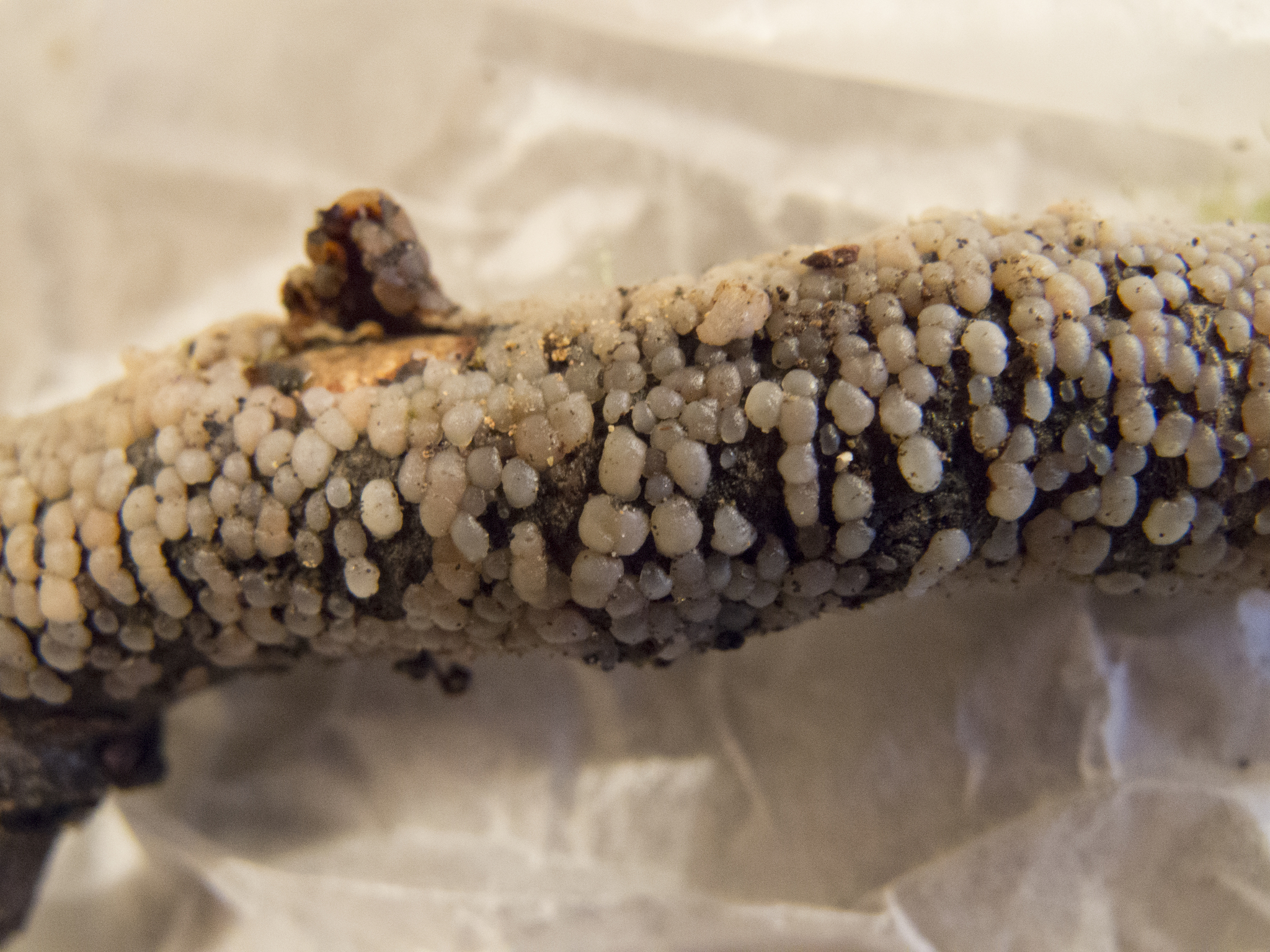
- Exidia nothofagi found on a branch of Nothofagus cliffortioides

Scientific classification
- Kingdom: Fungi
- Division: Basidiomycota
- Class: Agaricomycetes
- Order: Auriculariales
- Family: Auriculariaceae
- Genus: Exidia
- Species: E. nothofagi

Binomial name
- Exidia nothofagi (McNabb) J.A. Cooper (2023)

Synonyms
- Pseudostypella nothofagi McNabb (1969)

= Exidia nothofagi =

Species of fungus

Exidia nothofagi is a species of fungus in the family Auriculariaceae. Basidiocarps (fruit bodies) are gelatinous, pallid, minute and pustular at first then coalescing and becoming irregularly effused. It grows on dead branches of southern beech and is known from New Zealand.

== Taxonomy ==
The species was first described in 1969 from New Zealand by mycologist R.F.R. McNabb who placed it in his new genus Pseudostypella based on its minute, gregarious fruit bodies which he considered unlike those of more typical Exidia species. It was transferred to Exidia by J.A. Cooper in 2023.

== Description ==
The basidiocarps of E. nothofagi are gelatinous, pustular, and densely gregarious, with individual fruit bodies up to 1 mm across, coalescing to form effused, irregular pale whitish yellow to pinkish grey masses up to 15 cm across.

=== Microscopic characters ===
The translucent hyphae are thin-walled and form clamp connections. Basidia are elliptical and consist of four longitudinally septate cells. Basidiospores are allantoid (sausage shaped), 12 to 16 by 4.5 to 5.5 μm, with thin, smooth walls.

== Distribution and habitat ==
Exidia nothofagi was originally described from New Zealand where it has subsequently been recollected. It has been found on dead wood of Nothofagus species (southern beech) and may be restricted to this host genus.
