= Proterochaete =

Scientific classification
- Kingdom: Fungi
- Division: Basidiomycota
- Class: Agaricomycetes
- Order: Auriculariales
- Family: Auriculariaceae
- Genus: Proterochaete; Spirin & V. Malysheva (2019)

Type species
- Proterochaete adusta (Burt) Spirin & V. Malysheva (2019)

Synonyms
- Heterocorticium S.H.He, T.Nie & Yue Li (2023)

Genus of fungi

Proterochaete is a genus of fungi in the family Auriculariaceae. Species produce thin, effused, corticioid basidiocarps (fruit bodies) with a smooth or spiny surface on wood.

== Taxonomy ==
The genus was created as a result of molecular research, based on cladistic analysis of DNA sequences, which showed that Proterochaete adusta, previously referred to the genus Sebacina, formed its own unrelated and distinct clade. A subsequent revision added a further ten species to Proterochaete, some of which had previously been referred to the genera Exidiopsis and Heterocorticium. The latter genus was shown to be a synonym of Proterochaete.
