= Zygogloea =

Scientific classification
- Domain: Eukaryota
- Kingdom: Fungi
- Division: Basidiomycota
- Subdivision: Pucciniomycotina
- Genus: Zygogloea; P. Roberts (1994)

Type species
- Zygogloea gemellipara P. Roberts (1994)

Genus of fungi

Zygogloea is a genus of fungi in the phylum Basidiomycota. The type and only species, Zygogloea gemellipara, is an hymenial parasite of Myxarium nucleatum and produces no visible basidiocarps (fruit bodies) of its own. The species has "auricularioid" basidia (more or less cylindrical basidia with lateral septa), septate basidiospores, and forms unusual twinned zygoconidia. The hyphae of the parasite attach to the host hyphae through twisting, tendril-like haustorial cells. Zygogloea gemellipara was described from England and has also been reported from Belgium. The genus has been referred to the Pucciniomycotina, but its place within this subdivision is unknown.
