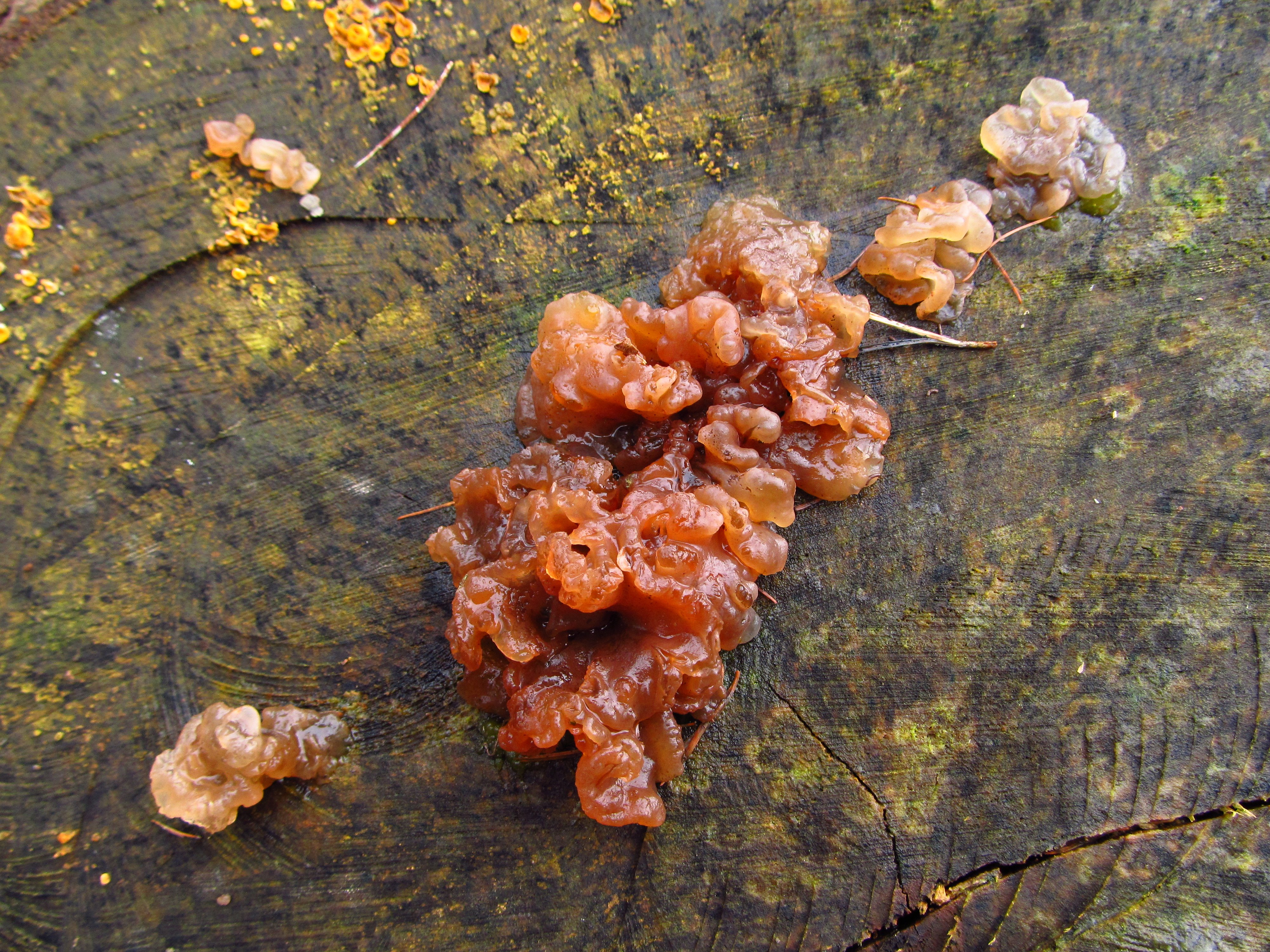
- Ulocolla saccharina, Germany

Scientific classification
- Kingdom: Fungi
- Division: Basidiomycota
- Class: Agaricomycetes
- Order: Auriculariales
- Family: Auriculariaceae
- Genus: Ulocolla; Bref. (1888)

Type species
- Ulocolla saccharina (Fr.) Bref. (1888)

Species
- U. corticioides; U. grisea; U. griseobrunnea; U. orbiculata; U. pinicola; U. saccharina; U. subrepanda

Synonyms
- Sclerotrema Spirin & Malysheva (2017)

= Ulocolla =

Genus of fungi

Ulocolla is a genus of fungi in the family Auriculariaceae. Species produce button-shaped, irregular, or effused, gelatinous basidiocarps (fruit bodies) on wood. Several were previously referred to the genera Exidia and Exidiopsis.

== Taxonomy ==
The genus was originally created in 1888 by German mycologist Julius Brefeld to accommodate two species, one of which, U. saccharina, was subsequently selected as the type. Ulocolla was treated as a synonym of Exidia until it was shown to be distinct as a result of molecular research, based on cladistic analysis of DNA sequences. The genus Sclerotrema, introduced for S. griseobrunneum, is now considered a synoynym.
