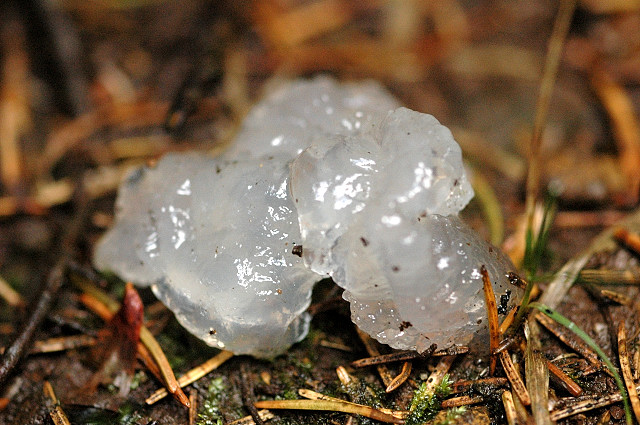
- Myxarium nucleatum

Scientific classification
- Kingdom: Fungi
- Division: Basidiomycota
- Class: Agaricomycetes
- Order: Auriculariales
- Family: Hyaloriaceae; Lindau (1900)

Genera
- Hyaloria; Myxarium

Synonyms
- Myxariaceae Jülich (1981)

= Hyaloriaceae =

Family of fungi

The Hyaloriaceae are a family of fungi in the order Auriculariales. Species within the family have gelatinous basidiocarps (fruit bodies) that produce spores on septate basidia and, as such, were formerly referred to the "heterobasidiomycetes" or "jelly fungi". All appear to be saprotrophic, growing on dead wood or plant remains. Less than 30 species are currently included within the Hyaloriaceae, but the family has not been extensively researched.

== Taxonomy ==
=== History ===
The family was established in 1900 by German mycologist Gustav Lindau to accommodate a single, neotropical species, Hyaloria pilacre. Lindau considered his new family to be close to the Tremellaceae, but distinguished by the "angiocarpous" or gasteroid development of its fruit bodies (meaning that the spore-bearing hymenia were covered until maturity, rather than exposed). The Hyaloriaceae were placed within the order Tremellales by most subsequent authors, until 1984, when American mycologist Robert Joseph Bandoni revised this group of fungi and placed the family within the Auriculariales. Wells (1994) later extended the Hyaloriaceae to include other genera with "myxarioid" basidia (septate basidia with an enucleate stalk), previously placed in the Aporpiaceae or Myxariaceae.

=== Current status ===
Initial molecular research, based on cladistic analysis of DNA sequences, has supported the placement of the Hyaloriaceae within the Auriculariales and has also supported Wells' placement of the genus Myxarium within the family, though not all genera with "myxarioid" basidia are included.

== Description ==
Species within the Hyaloriaceae form gelatinous fruit bodies that are pustular, lobed, or effused (Myxarium species) or resemble miniature puffballs (Hyaloria species). Microscopically, all possess "myxarioid" basidia.

== Distribution and habitat ==
Species appear to be saprotrophic, growing on dead wood or plant remains. Their distribution is cosmopolitan.
