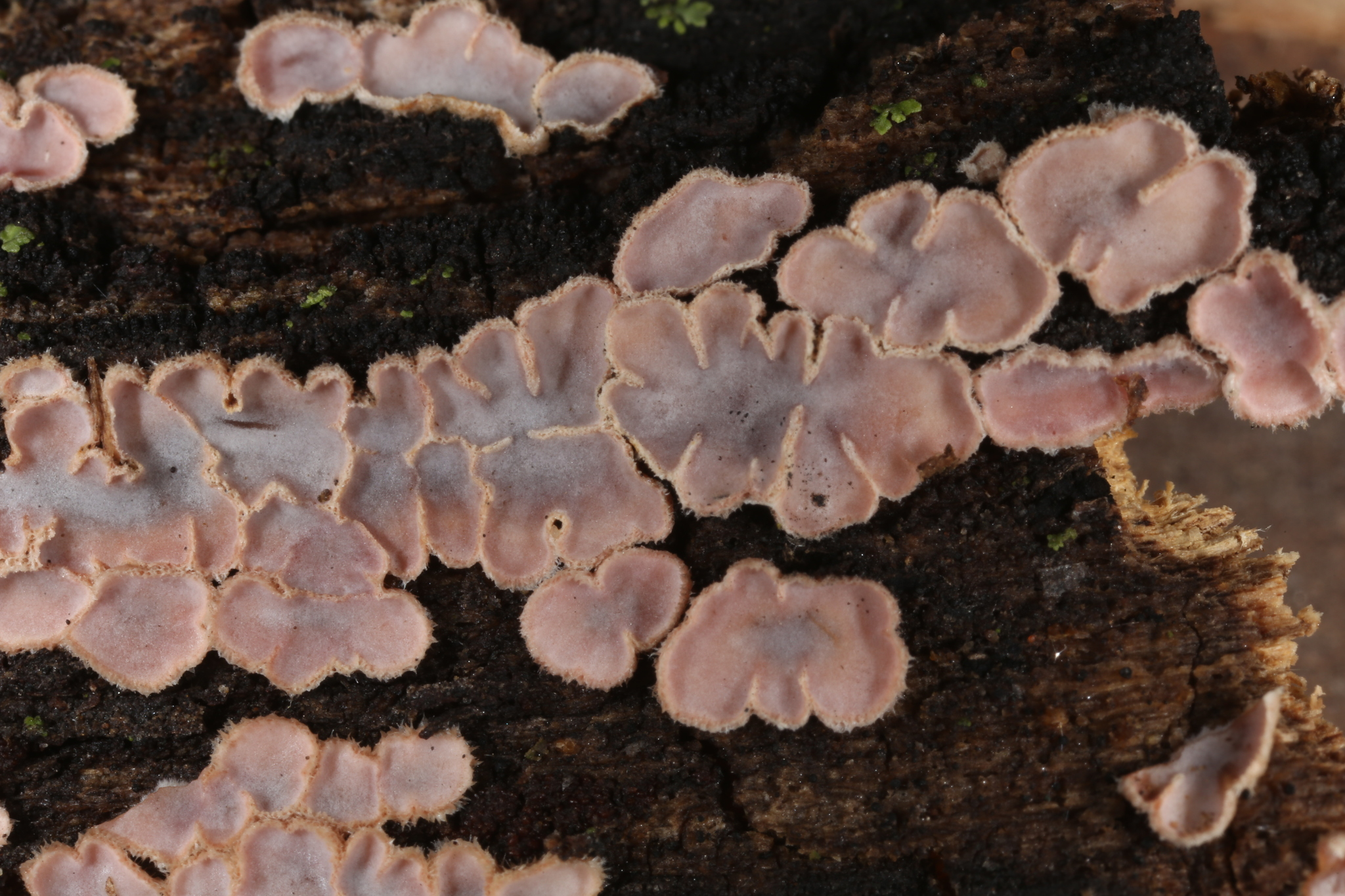
- Amphistereum schrenkii

Scientific classification
- Kingdom: Fungi
- Division: Basidiomycota
- Class: Agaricomycetes
- Order: Auriculariales
- Family: Auriculariaceae
- Genus: Amphistereum; Spirin & V. Malysheva (2017)

Type species
- Amphistereum schrenkii (Burt) Spirin & V. Malysheva (2017)

Species
- Amphistereum leveilleanum

= Amphistereum =

Genus of fungi

Amphistereum is a genus of fungi in the family Auriculariaceae. Species produce cupulate to effused, leathery basidiocarps (fruit bodies) on wood. Microscopically, fruit bodies have a dimitic hyphal system. The genus is currently only known from North and South America.

== Taxonomy ==
The genus was created as a result of molecular research, based on cladistic analysis of DNA sequences, which showed that two species previously referred to the genus Eichleriella formed a related, but distinct grouping.
