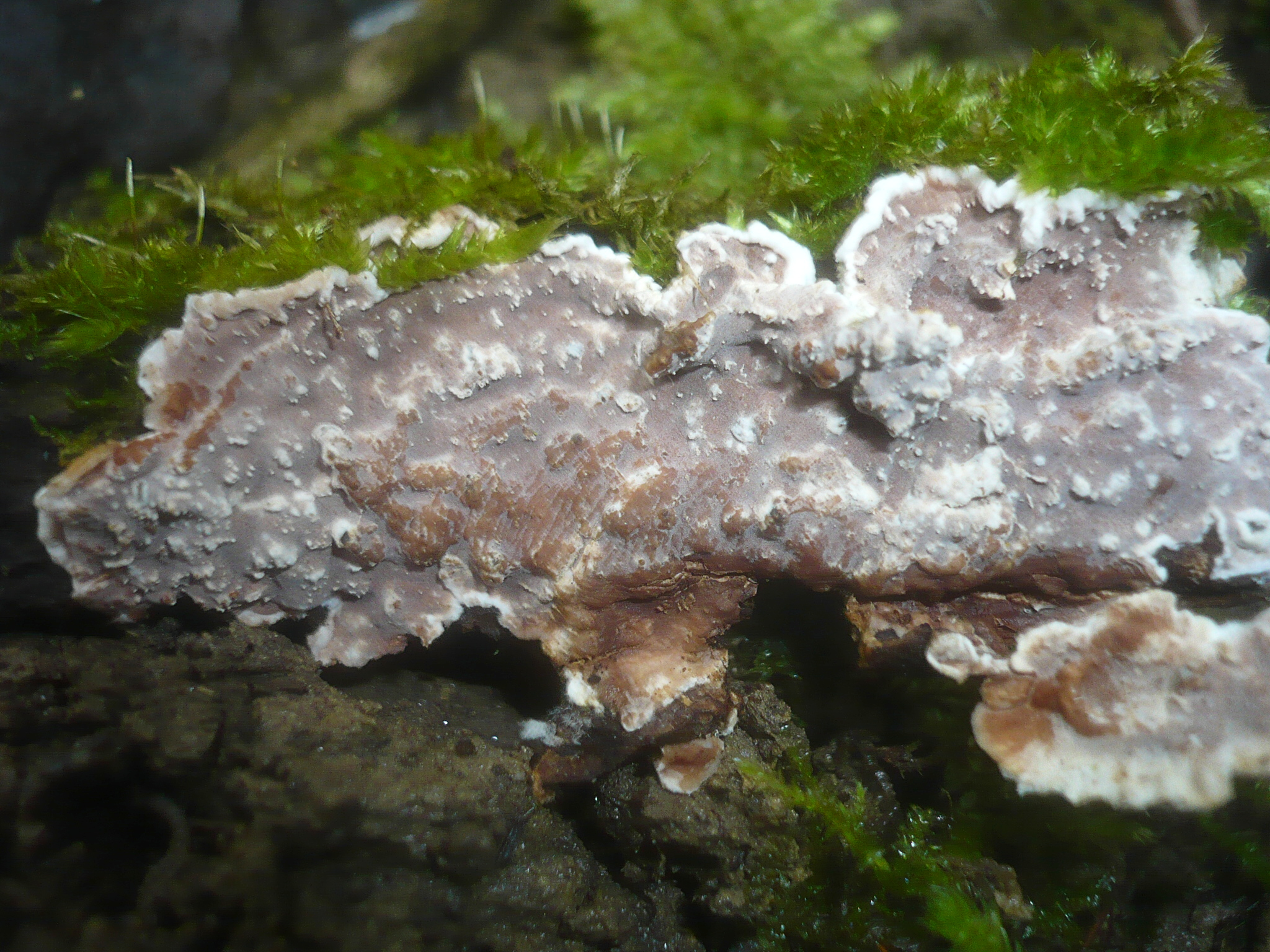
- Heteroradulum deglubens

Scientific classification
- Domain: Eukaryota
- Kingdom: Fungi
- Division: Basidiomycota
- Class: Agaricomycetes
- Order: Auriculariales
- Family: Auriculariaceae
- Genus: Heteroradulum; Lloyd. ex Spirin & Malysheva (2017)

Type species
- Heteroradulum kmetii (Bres.) Spirin & Malysheva (2017)

Species
- Heteroradulum adnatum Heteroradulum australiense Heteroradulum brasiliense Heteroradulum deglubens Heteroradulum labyrinthinum Heteroradulum lividofuscum Heteroradulum maolanense Heteroradulum mussooriensis Heteroradulum niveum Heteroradulum spinulosum

Synonyms
- Grammatus H.S. Yuan & C. Decock (2018)

= Heteroradulum =

Genus of fungi

Heteroradulum is a genus of fungi in the order Auriculariales. Species produce effused, leathery basidiocarps (fruit bodies) on wood, often pinkish red and partly or wholly covered in small sterile spines. The genus was originally published in 1917 by American mycologist Curtis Gates Lloyd under the facetious pseudonym "McGinty", rendering the name invalid. It was validated a century later to accommodate a group of species formerly placed in the genera Eichleriella or Heterochaete, but not closely related to either.
