= Heterochaete =

Scientific classification
- Kingdom: Fungi
- Division: Basidiomycota
- Class: Agaricomycetes
- Order: Auriculariales
- Family: Auriculariaceae
- Genus: Heterochaete; Pat. (1892)

Type species
- Heterochaete andina Pat. & Lagerh. (1892)

Genus of fungi

Heterochaete is a genus of fungi in the order Auriculariales. Species produce effused, gelatinous, waxy, or leathery basidiocarps (fruit bodies) on wood, partly or wholly covered in small sterile spines or pegs. The presence of these sterile spines distinguishes the genus from Exidiopsis, species of which are microscopically similar but have smooth basidiocarps.

Heterochaete was monographed by Bodman in 1952 who accepted some 29 species worldwide, most of them from the tropics and subtropics. On the basis of morphological differences, Bodman considered the genus to be heterogeneous and this has been confirmed by molecular research, based on cladistic analysis of DNA sequences. As a result, several species previously placed in Heterochaete have now been referred to the genera Crystallodon, Eichleriella, Heteroradulum, Hirneolina, Metulochaete, and Tremellochaete.

DNA research has also indicated that the type species, H. andina, is congeneric with Exidiopsis making Heterochaete an earlier name for Exidiopsis, though no name changes have yet been made on this basis. Most of the 30 or so residual species in Heterochaete have yet to be re-assessed.
