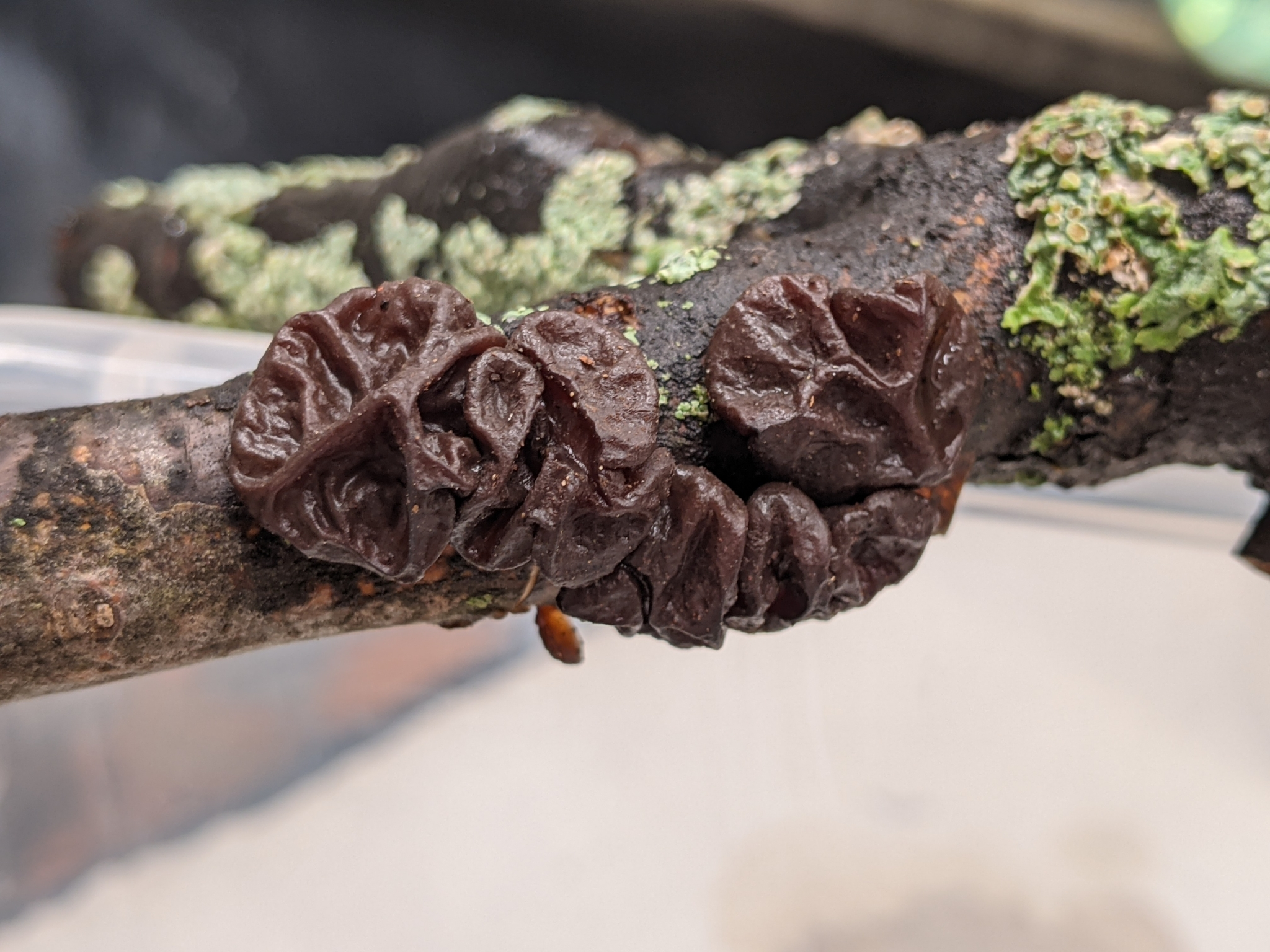

Scientific classification
- Domain: Eukaryota
- Kingdom: Fungi
- Division: Basidiomycota
- Class: Agaricomycetes
- Order: Auriculariales
- Family: Auriculariaceae
- Genus: Exidia
- Species: E. crenata

Binomial name
- Exidia crenata (Schwein.) Fr. (1822)

Synonyms
- Tremella crenata Schwein. (1822)

= Exidia crenata =

Species of fungus

Exidia crenata is a species of fungus in the family Auriculariaceae. It has the English name of amber jelly roll. Basidiocarps (fruit bodies) are gelatinous, brown to orange-brown, and turbinate (top-shaped). It typically grows on dead attached twigs and branches of broadleaved trees and is found in North America.

== Taxonomy ==
The species was originally described from North Carolina in 1822 by German-American mycologist Lewis David de Schweinitz as Tremella crenata. It was transferred to the genus Exidia by Fries in the same year. Exidia crenata was widely considered a synonym of the European Exidia recisa until molecular research, based on cladistic analysis of DNA sequences, showed that the American species is distinct.

== Description ==
The gelatinous fruit bodies are amber, 8–25 millimetres (3/8–1 inch) wide, and 4–12 mm (3/16–1/2 in) thick. They can be translucent and tend to be moist and/or glossy. The spore print is white.

=== Similar species ===
Similar species include E. recisa and members of the genera Auricularia and Phaeotremella.

== Habitat and distribution ==
Exidia crenata is a wood-rotting species, typically found on dead attached twigs and branches of broadleaf trees, particularly oak. It is widely distributed in eastern North America, where it can be found from September through May, thriving in winter.
