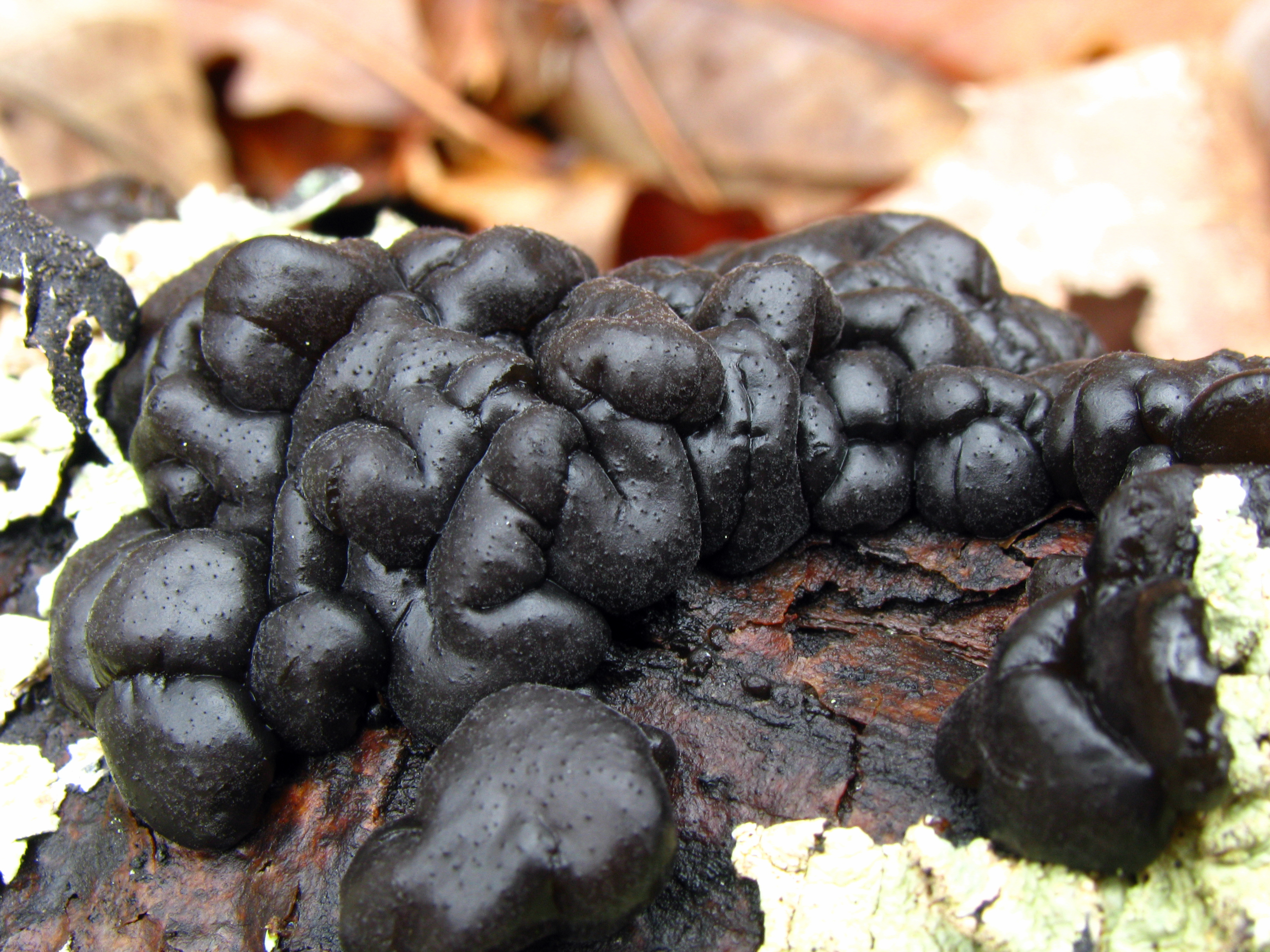
- Exidia glandulosa

Scientific classification
- Kingdom: Fungi
- Division: Basidiomycota
- Class: Agaricomycetes
- Order: Auriculariales
- Family: Auriculariaceae
- Genus: Exidia; Fr.

Type species
- Exidia glandulosa (Bull.) Fr.

Synonyms
- Tremellochaete Raitv. (1964)

= Exidia =

Genus of fungi

Exidia is a genus of fungi in the family Auriculariaceae. The species are saprotrophic, occurring in attached or recently fallen dead wood, and produce gelatinous basidiocarps (fruit bodies). The fruit bodies are diverse: pustular, lobed, button-shaped, cup-shaped, or effused. Several species, including the type species Exidia glandulosa, have sterile pegs or pimples on their spore-bearing surface. The genus has a cosmopolitan distribution and over 25 species are currently recognized worldwide.

== Taxonomy ==
Exidia species were originally placed in the genus Tremella along with many other gelatinous fungi. The genus Exidia was separated from Tremella by Fries in 1822, based mainly on fruit body shape. Fries initially included species now assigned to Auricularia within the genus.

Tremellochaete was originally created in 1964 by Estonian mycologist Ain Raitviir to accommodate Tremellochaete japonica, a species with a notably spiny hymenium that appeared morphologically intermediate between Exidia and Heterochaete. The genus was initially thought to be distinct as a result of molecular research, based on cladistic analysis of DNA sequences. But subsequent research has reduced it to synonymy with Exidia.

Molecular research has indicated that Exidia as formerly circumscribed was an artificial grouping. Accordingly, some species previously placed in Exidia have now been transferred to the genera Descidia and Ulocolla, leaving Exidia sensu stricto as a natural grouping. A number of species have, however, yet to be sequenced.

== Description ==
Exidia fruit bodies are gelatinous, most non-effused species having a distinct spore-bearing upper surface and a sterile undersurface. These surfaces are either smooth or (in some species) covered in dense or scattered sterile pegs or pimples. Fruit bodies grow either separately or in groups, in which case they may coalesce.

=== Microscopic characters ===
Exidia fruit bodies are composed of hyphae with clamp connections in a gelatinous matrix. The spore-bearing surface is initially covered in a layer of branched hyphidia below which the basidia are formed. The basidia are tremelloid (ellipsoid and vertically septate), giving rise to long, sinuous sterigmata or epibasidia on which the basidiospores are produced. These spores are allantoid (sausage-shaped) or less commonly oblong to cylindrical.

== Species ==
The list below comprises species of Exidia (including those now referred to Descidia and Ulocolla) that have recently been described or redescribed. Species marked with an asterisk have been sequenced and belong to Exidia sensu stricto. Some additional older species may also be valid, but lack a modern description. The type locality (but not the wider distribution) is given for each species.

Image	Name	Type Locality
	Exidia aeruginosa	Jamaica
	Exidia alveolata	Ecuador
	Exidia ambipapillata	Guatemala
	Exidia antiguae	Guatemala
	Exidia brunneola	Finland
	Exidia candida*	USA
	Exidia ciliata*	Brazil
	Exidia compacta	USA
	Exidia crenata*	USA
	Exidia cystidiata	USA
	Exidia delita*	France
	Exidia friesiana*	Finland
	Exidia glandulosa*	France
	Exidia impressa*	France
	Exidia inornata*	France
	Exidia japonica*	Japan
	Exidia lutea	Guatemala
	Exidia maracensis	Brazil
	Exidia maya	Guatemala
	Exidia mexicana	Mexico
	Exidia nothofagi	New Zealand
	Exidia panamensis	Panama
	Exidia pergamena	Brazil
	Ulocolla pinicola	USA
	Exidia pithya*	Sweden
	Exidia plumbescens*	USA
	Exidia purpureocinerea	South Africa
	Exidia pusilla	Brunei
	Exidia recisa*	Germany
	Exidia reflexa	China
	Descidia repanda	Sweden
	Ulocolla saccharina	Sweden
	Exidia repleta*	France
	Exidia saturata*	France
	Exidia semiorbis*	Russia
	Exidia spiculata*	USA
	Exidia straminea*	France
	Exidia subglandulosa*	China
	Exidia tanzanica*	Tanzania
	Descidia thuretiana	France
	Exidia truncata*	Sweden
	Exidia tucumanensis	Argentina
	Exidia umbrinella*	Italy
	Exidia uvapassa*	Japan
	Exidia yadongensis*	China
	Exidia zelleri*	USA
