= Eichleriella =

Scientific classification
- Kingdom: Fungi
- Division: Basidiomycota
- Class: Agaricomycetes
- Order: Auriculariales
- Family: Auriculariaceae
- Genus: Eichleriella; Bres. (1903)

Type species
- Eichleriella incarnata Bres.

Species
- Eichleriella alliciens Eichleriella alpina Eichleriella bactriana Eichleriella bambusicola Eichleriella crocata Eichleriella delicata Eichleriella desertorum Eichleriella discolor Eichleriella flavida Eichleriella leucophaea Eichleriella macrospora Eichleriella shearii Eichleriella sicca Eichleriella sinensis Eichleriella tenuicula Eichleriella xinpingensis

Genus of fungi

Eichleriella is a genus of fungi in the order Auriculariales. Species produce effused or cupulate, waxy to leathery basidiocarps (fruit bodies) on wood, with a smooth to spiny surface. The genus currently contains more than 15 species.

Molecular research, based on cladistic analysis of DNA sequences, has redefined the genus, with some species now placed in Heteroradulum and others transferred to Eichleriella from Heterochaete. Eichleriella was named by Italian mycologist Giacomo Bresadola in honour of Bogumił Eichler (1843 - 1905), Polish botanist and mycologist.
