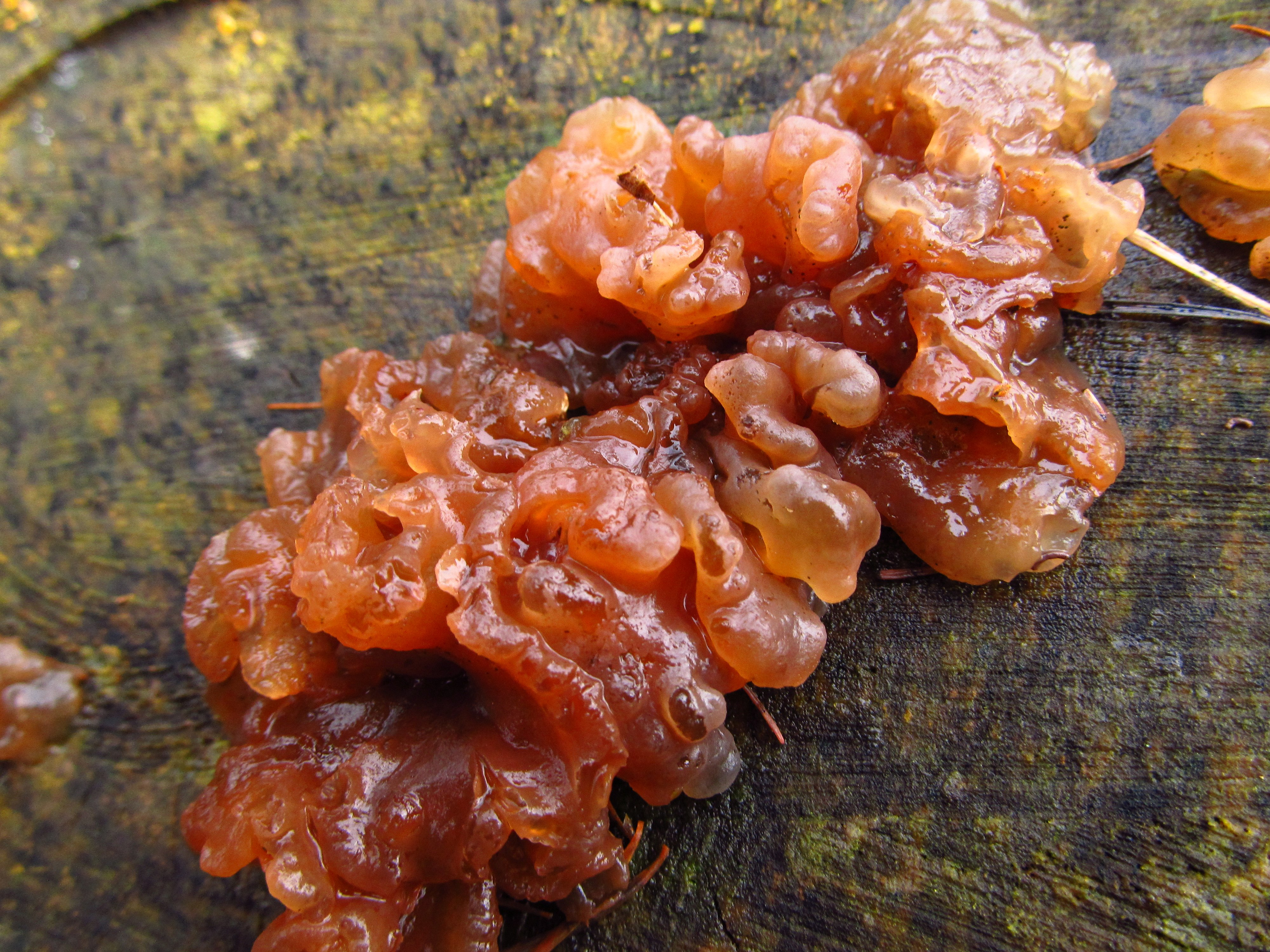
- Ulocolla saccharina, Niederrhein, Germany

Scientific classification
- Kingdom: Fungi
- Division: Basidiomycota
- Class: Agaricomycetes
- Order: Auriculariales
- Family: Auriculariaceae
- Genus: Ulocolla
- Species: U. saccharina

Binomial name
- Ulocolla saccharina (Alb. & Schwein.) Bref. (1888)

Synonyms
- Tremella spiculosa var. saccharina Alb. & Schwein. (1805); Exidia saccharina (Alb. & Schwein.) Fr. (1822); Tremella saccharina (Alb. & Schwein.) J. Becker (1828); Dacrymyces saccharinus (Alb. & Schwein.) Sacc. & Traverso (1910); Exidia subsaccharina F. Wu, Rivoire, Tohtirjap & Y.C. Dai (2023)

= Ulocolla saccharina =

Species of fungus

Ulocolla saccharina is a species of fungus in the family Auriculariaceae. Basidiocarps (fruit bodies) are gelatinous, reddish brown, button-shaped at first then often coalescing and becoming irregularly effused. It has the recommended English name of pine jelly. It is a saprotroph, growing on dead branches of pine in Europe.

== Taxonomy ==
The species was first described in 1805 from Germany as Tremella spiculosa var. saccharina by mycologists Johannes Baptista von Albertini and Lewis David de Schweinitz and raised to species level in Exidia by Elias Magnus Fries in 1822. Recent molecular research, based on cladistic analysis of DNA sequences, has shown that the species belongs in a clade distinct from Exidia and is referable to the genus Ulocolla.

== Description ==
The basidiocarps of U. saccharina are orange-brown, gelatinous, button-shaped at first but later coalescing to form effused, irregular, often ridged or folded masses up to 20 cm across and 2 cm thick. The surface is smooth or occasionally with small, scattered, spiny projections.

=== Microscopic characters ===
The translucent hyphae are 1.0–6.5 μm in diameter, monomitic, branched, thin-walled, and form clamp connections. Hyphae frequently form anastomoses. Basidia are typically 15 to 22.5 μm long, elliptical, and consist of four longitudinally septate cells. Basidiospores are allantoid (sausage shaped), 10 to 18 by 4 to 6 μm, with thin, smooth walls.

=== Similar species ===
Fruit bodies of Ulocolla subrepanda may also occur on pine in Europe and are not easily distinguishable in the field, but have smaller spores under 11.5 μm long. Ulocolla subrepanda may also occur on spruce and larch, whereas U. saccharina is only known on pine. The two species were considered to be synonyms until recently and descriptions prior to 2026 may combine features of both.

== Distribution and habitat ==
Ulocolla saccharina is most common in Scandinavia, but can also be found elsewhere in Europe. A similar species, Ulocolla pinicola, occurs in North America.

== Conservation status ==
Ulocolla saccharina is currently listed on the register of protected and endangered fungi of Poland.
