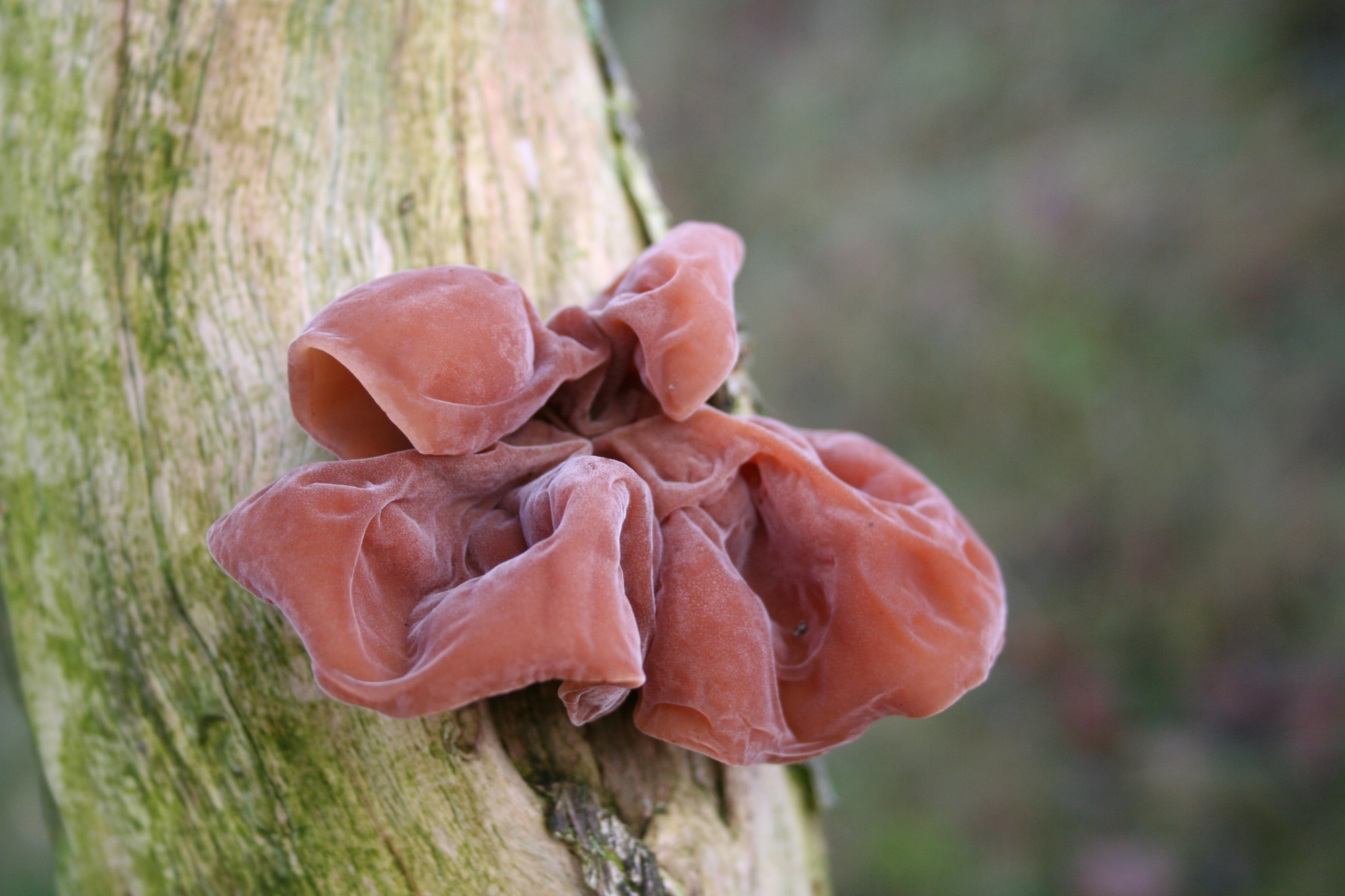
- Auricularia auricula-judae

Scientific classification
- Kingdom: Fungi
- Division: Basidiomycota
- Class: Agaricomycetes
- Order: Auriculariales
- Family: Auriculariaceae; Fr. ex Lindau (1897)

Genera
- Adustochaete; Amphistereum; Aporpium; Auricularia; Eichleriella; Elmerina; Exidia; Exidiopsis; Heterochaete; Heteroradulum; Hirneolina; Proterochaete; Protodaedalea; Scrupulispora; Tegmenticium; Ulocolla

Synonyms
- Aporpiaceae Bondartsev & Bondartseva (1960); Exidiaceae R.T.Moore (1978)

= Auriculariaceae =

Family of fungi

The Auriculariaceae are a family of fungi in the order Auriculariales. Species within the family were formerly referred to the "heterobasidiomycetes" or "jelly fungi", since many have gelatinous basidiocarps (fruit bodies) that produce spores on septate basidia. Around 100 species are known worldwide. All are believed to be saprotrophic, most growing on dead wood. Fruit bodies of several Auricularia species are cultivated for food on a commercial scale, especially in China.

== Taxonomy ==
=== History ===
The family was established in 1897 by German mycologist Gustav Lindau to accommodate species of fungi having "gymnocarpous" basidiocarps (with the hymenium exposed) and "auricularioid" basidia (more or less cylindrical basidia with lateral septa). It included not only the genus Auricularia, but also Platygloea, Jola, Saccoblastia, and Stypinella (= Helicobasidium). In 1922, British mycologist Carleton Rea recognized the family as containing the genera Auricularia, Eocronartium, Helicobasidium, Platygloea, and Stilbum. Both Lindau and Rea placed the family within the Auriculariales, but some subsequent authors placed it within the Tremellales.

A radical revision was undertaken in 1984, when American mycologist Robert Joseph Bandoni used transmission electron microscopy to investigate the ultrastructure of the septal pore apparatus in the Auriculariales. This revealed that species of fungi with "auricularioid" basidia were not necessarily closely related and that Auricularia had more in common with Exidia and its allies (with "tremelloid" basidia), than with other auricularioid fungi. Bandoni therefore limited the Auriculariaceae to the genus Auricularia.

=== Current status ===
Molecular research, based on cladistic analysis of DNA sequences, has confirmed that the Auriculariaceae belong within the order Auriculariales, but has also indicated that the family is not distinguishable from the Exidiaceae. A clade containing Auricularia and Exidia species (plus their allies) equates to the Auriculariaceae.

== Description ==
The majority of species within the Auriculariaceae produce gelatinous basidiocarps (fruit bodies) on dead wood. In some these are conspicuous and may be ear-shaped, button-shaped, lobed, or effused. Their hymenophores (spore-bearing surfaces) may be smooth, warted, veined, spiny, or poroid. Some species, however, produce dry, leathery, or web-like fruit bodies resembling those of the corticioid fungi.

== Distribution and habitat ==
All species within the Auriculariaceae are thought to be saprotrophs, most of them wood-rotters typically found on dead attached or fallen wood. As a group, their distribution is cosmopolitan. The Auriculariaceae currently contain some 15 genera.

== Economic importance ==
Several species within the order are edible and two, Auricularia heimuer and Auricularia cornea, are cultivated on a commercial scale, particularly in China and southeast Asia. They are widely exported, in a dried or powdered state, as "black fungus", "cloud ears", or "wood ears".

== See also ==
- List of Basidiomycota families
