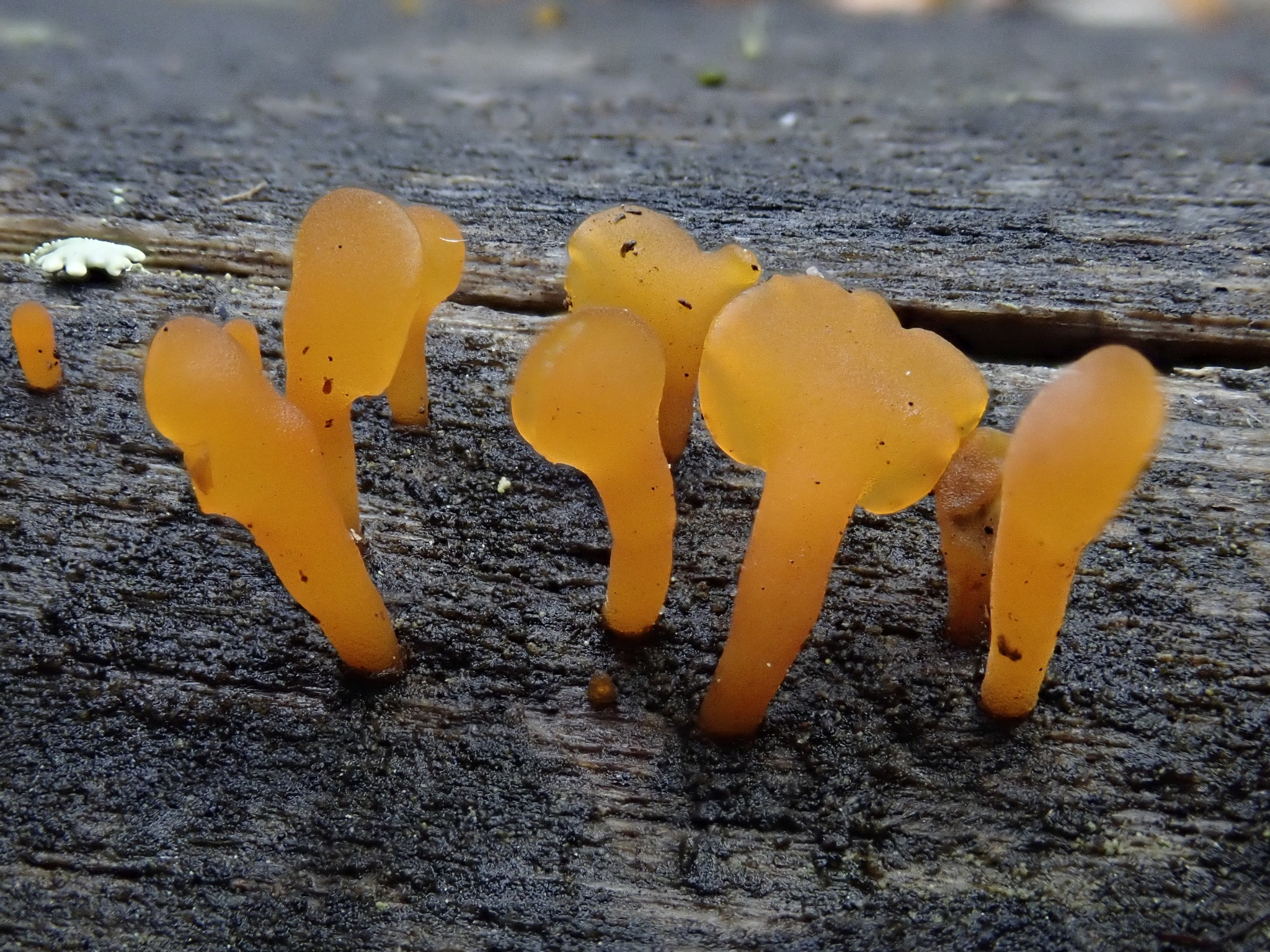
- Dacrymyces spathularia, Australia

Scientific classification
- Kingdom: Fungi
- Division: Basidiomycota
- Class: Dacrymycetes
- Order: Dacrymycetales
- Family: Dacrymycetaceae
- Genus: Dacrymyces
- Species: D. spathularia

Binomial name
- Dacrymyces spathularia (Schwein.) Alvarenga

Synonyms
- Cantharellus spathularia (Schwein.) Schwein.; Dacryopinax spathularia (Schwein.) G.W. Martin; Dacryopinax spathularia f. agariciformis (Lloyd) D.A. Reid; Guepinia agariciformis Lloyd; Guepinia spathularia (Schwein.) Fr.; Guepinia spathularia f. alba G.W. Martin; Guepiniopsis spathularia (Schwein.) Pat.; Masseeola spathulata (Schwein.) Kuntze; Merulius spathularia Schwein.

= Dacrymyces spathularia =

Species of fungus

Dacrymyces spathularia is a species of fungus in the family Dacrymycetaceae. Basidiocarps (fruit bodies) are gelatinous, frequently spathulate (spoon-shaped), and grow on wood, mainly in the tropics and subtropics. The fungus is edible and is commercially cultivated for use as an additive in the food industry.

== Taxonomy ==
The species was first described as Merulius spathularius by German-American mycologist Lewis David de Schweinitz based on a collection from North Carolina in the United States. It was moved to the newly created genus Dacryopinax by American mycologist G. W. Martin in 1948 in recognition of its fruit bodies' frequently spathulate shape. Microscopically, however, the species is not typical of the genus and this has been confirmed by recent molecular research, based on cladistic analysis of DNA sequences. Dacryopinax spathularia is not closely related to the type species (Dacryopinax elegans) and belongs elsewhere. It has been placed in a widely defined Dacrymyces, but this latter genus still awaits a comprehensive revision.

== Description ==
The fruit bodies of Dacrymyces spathularia are gregarious, often clustered, and have a distinct stipe (stem) and fertile head that is flattened and fan-like (spathulate) or less commonly palmate. They are tough-gelatinous to cartilaginous and yellow to orange, usually 0.5–2.5 cm (1/4–1 in) tall and between 0.3 and 1.2 cm wide. Microscopically, the species has cylindrical basidiospores that become septate at maturity, measuring 7–11.5 by 3.5–4.5 μm.

=== Similar species ===
It resembles Guepiniopsis buccina and young specimens of Dacrymyces chrysospermus.

== Habitat and distribution ==
Dacrymyces spathularia grows on both rotting coniferous and broadleaf wood; it has even been reported to grow on polyester rugs. It is widely distributed in Asia, Africa, Australia and the Pacific, North and South America, but is not known from Europe.

== Uses ==
Dacryopinax spathularia is edible. The species is commercially cultivated to produce long-chain glycolipids used as a natural preservative in soft drinks. The process involves fermentation of Dacryopinax spathularia using glucose as a carbon source in aerobic submerged culture.

In China fruit bodies are called guìhuā'ěr (桂花耳, literally "sweet osmanthus ear", referring to their resemblance to osmanthus flowers). They are sometimes included in a vegetarian dish called Buddha's delight.
