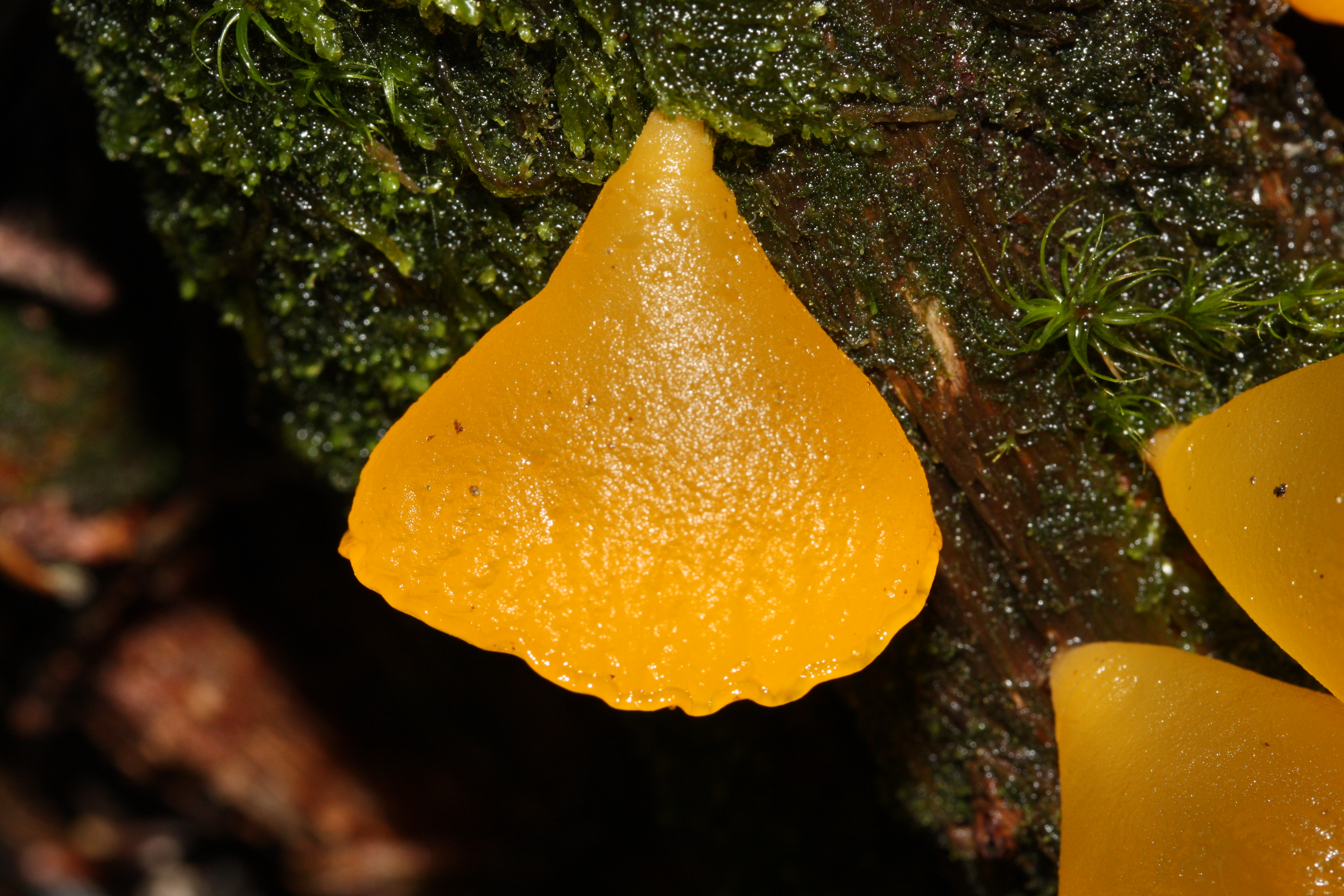

Scientific classification
- Kingdom: Fungi
- Division: Basidiomycota
- Class: Dacrymycetes
- Order: Dacrymycetales
- Family: Dacrymycetaceae
- Genus: Guepiniopsis
- Species: G. alpina

Binomial name
- Guepiniopsis alpina (Tracy & Earle) Brasf. (1938)

Synonyms
- Guepinia alpina Tracy & Earle (1901); Heterotextus alpinus (Tracy & Earle) G.W.Martin (1932)

= Guepiniopsis alpina =

Species of fungus

Guepiniopsis alpina
- Mycological characteristics
- Smooth hymenium
- No distinct cap
- Hymenium attachment is irregular or not applicable
- Stipe is bare
- Ecology is saprotrophic
- Edibility is unknown

Guepiniopsis alpina, commonly known as the jelly cup, alpine jelly cone, or poor man's gumdrop, is a species of fungus in the family Dacrymycetaceae. The small, gelatinous fruit bodies are orange and cone- or cup-shaped, producing a yellowish spore print.

Found in western North America and Iran, the fungus grows on decaying conifer wood. It is of little to no culinary interest.

== Taxonomy ==
The fungus was first described in 1901 by Samuel Mills Tracy and Franklin Sumner Earle under the name Guepinia alpina in 1901. It was later transferred to Heterotextus in 1932, and then to Guepiniopsis in 1938.

It is commonly known as the "jelly cup", "alpine jelly cone", or "poor man's gumdrop".

== Description ==
The fruit bodies are cone-shaped, measuring up to 2.5 cm (1 in) across. They hang from a narrow attachment to the substrate. They are bright yellow to orange, with a gelatinous texture and a smooth and sticky surface on top, but have external hairs. The dried fruit bodies deepen to reddish-orange and become hard. The basidiospores are produced on the inner surface of the cup and are yellowish in deposit. The spores are sausage shaped, 11–18 by 4–6 μm, and have three or four septa. Like all members of the Dacrymycetes, the basidia are Y-shaped.

=== Similar species ===
Species with which G. alpina could be confused include Bisporella citrina, Dacrymyces capitatus (up to 3 millimetres wide), and D. stillatus (never cone-shaped). Guepiniopsis chrysocomus is a related species with a somewhat similar appearance. It has a yellow fruit body, larger spores, and uses rotting hardwood as a substrate.

== Habitat and distribution ==
The fruit bodies grow scattered, in groups, or clusters on decaying, bark-free conifer wood. A snowbank fungus, it is most common at higher elevations after snowmelt in the spring. It is found in North America west of the Rocky Mountains. In 2010, it was recorded for the first time in Iran. It may also appear in Sweden.

== Edibility ==
The edibility of G. alpina is unknown, but it is too small to be considered for the table. It has been claimed to be edible, but tastes bland at best. One guide classifies it as inedible.
