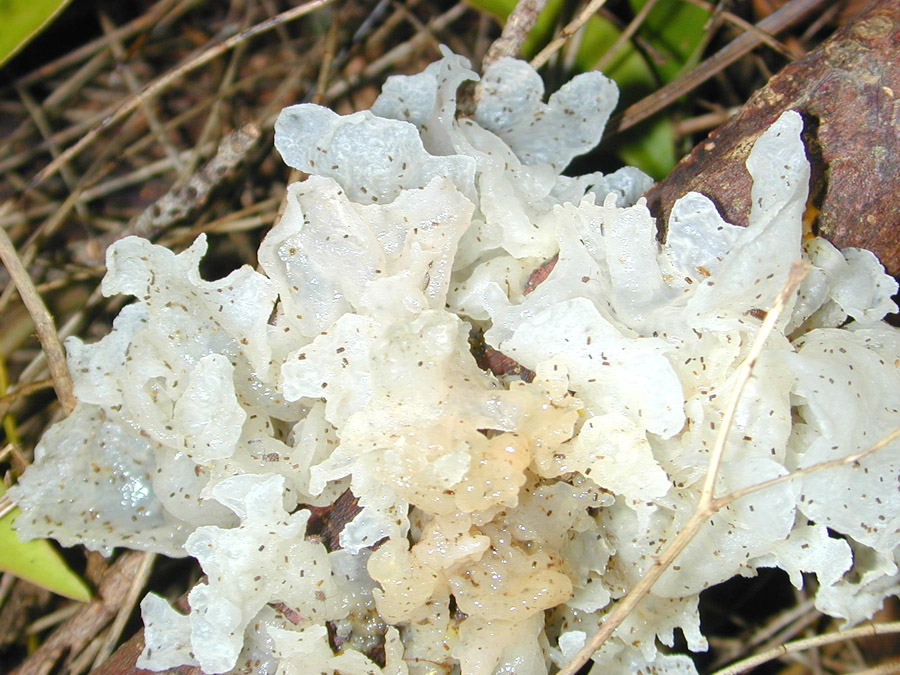
- A jelly fungus (Tremella cf. fuciformis)

Scientific classification
- Kingdom: Fungi
- Division: Basidiomycota
- Subdivision: Agaricomycotina

Orders with jelly fungus species
- Tremellales; Auriculariales; Dacrymycetales; Sebacinales

= Jelly fungus =

Jelly fungi

Group of fungi

Jelly fungi are a paraphyletic group of several heterobasidiomycete fungal orders from different classes of the subphylum Agaricomycotina: Tremellales, Dacrymycetales, Auriculariales and Sebacinales. These fungi are so named because their foliose, irregularly branched fruiting body is, or appears to be, the consistency of jelly. Actually, many are somewhat rubbery and gelatinous. When dried, jelly fungi become hard and shriveled; when exposed to water, they return to their original form.

Many species of jelly fungi can be eaten raw; poisonous jelly fungi are rare [needs source] and may not even exist. However, many species have an unpalatable texture or taste. They may or may not be sought in mushroom hunting due to their taste, which is described as similar to that of soil. However, some species, Tremella fuciformis for example, are not only edible but prized for use in soup and vegetable dishes.

== Notable jelly fungi ==
- Ascocoryne sarcoides – jelly drops, purple jellydisc (often mistaken for basidiomycota but is not)
- Auricularia auricula-judae species complex
  - Auricularia auricula-judae – wood ear, jelly ear, Judas' ear
  - Auricularia heimuer – wood ear, black fungus, cloud ear
- Auricularia cornea – hairy wood ear
- Calocera cornea
- Calocera viscosa – yellow tuning fork, yellow stagshorn fungus
- Dacrymyces palmatus – orange jelly
- Dacrymyces spathularia
- Exidia glandulosa – black jelly roll, witches' butter
- Exidia recisa – amber jelly roll, willow brain
- Guepiniopsis alpina – golden jelly cone
- Myxarium nucleatum – crystal brain, granular jelly roll
- Naematelia aurantialba species complex
- Phaeotremella foliacea – jelly leaf
- Phlogiotis helvelloides – apricot jelly
- Pseudohydnum gelatinosum – jelly tooth, jelly tongue
- Tremella fuciformis – snow fungus
- Tremella mesenterica – witches' butter, yellow brain fungus
- Tremellodendron and Sebacina spp. – jellied false corals
