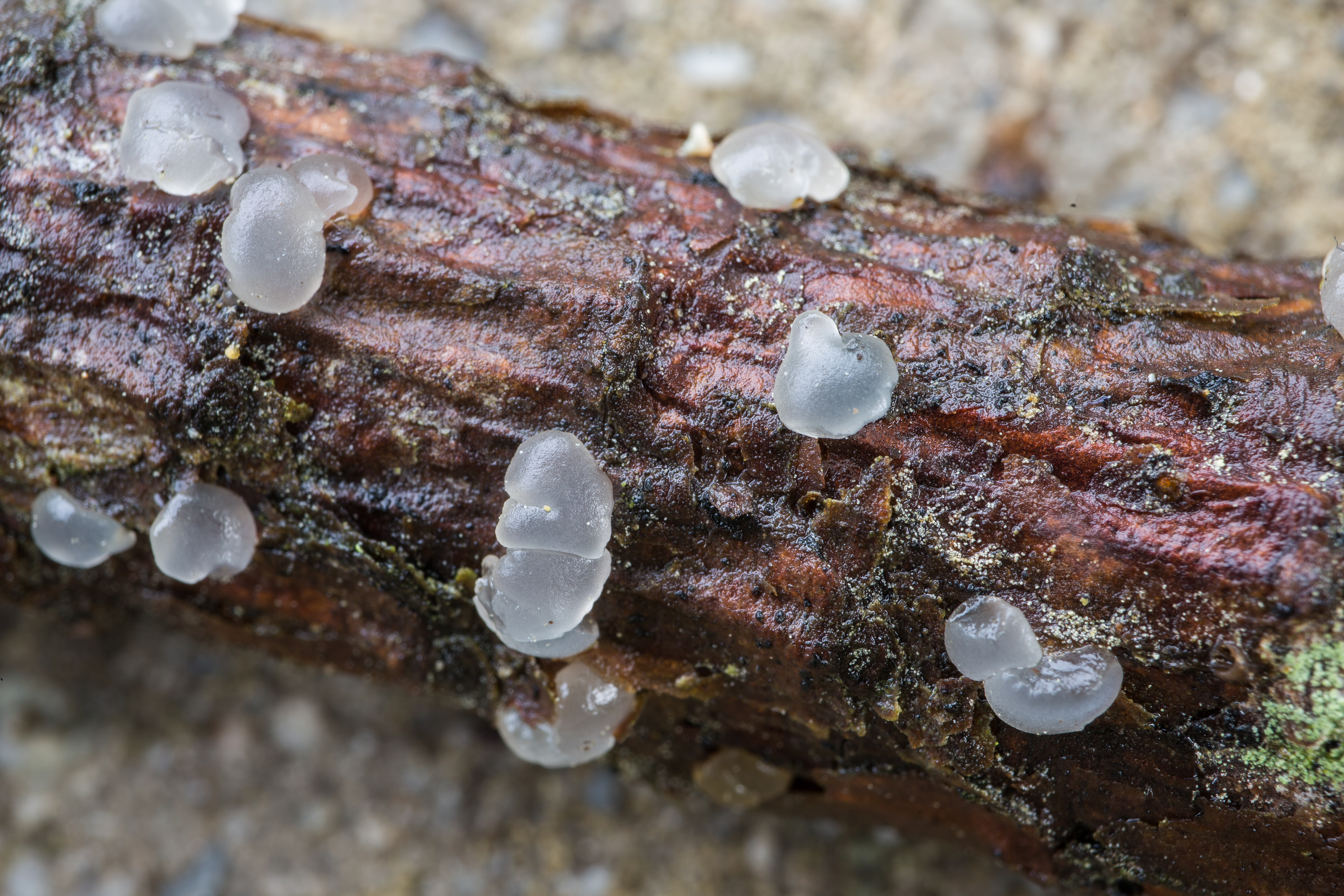
- Cerinomyces tortus

Scientific classification
- Kingdom: Fungi
- Division: Basidiomycota
- Class: Dacrymycetes
- Order: Dacrymycetales
- Family: Cerinomycetaceae
- Genus: Cerinomyces; G.W.Martin (1949)

Type species
- Cerinomyces pallidus G.W.Martin (1949)

= Cerinomyces =

Class of fungi

Cerinomyces is a genus of fungi in the order Dacrymycetales. Species are saprotrophs and occur on dead wood. As originally conceived, the genus comprised species of the Dacrymycetes having effused, corticioid basidiocarps (fruit bodies). Molecular research, based on cladistic analysis of DNA sequences, has however shown that this circumscription is not valid. As a result, the genus now contains some (but not all) species having corticioid basidiocarps and some additional species (previously referred to Dacrymyces) with gelatinous, pustular basidiocarps. Around 30 species have been described worldwide.
