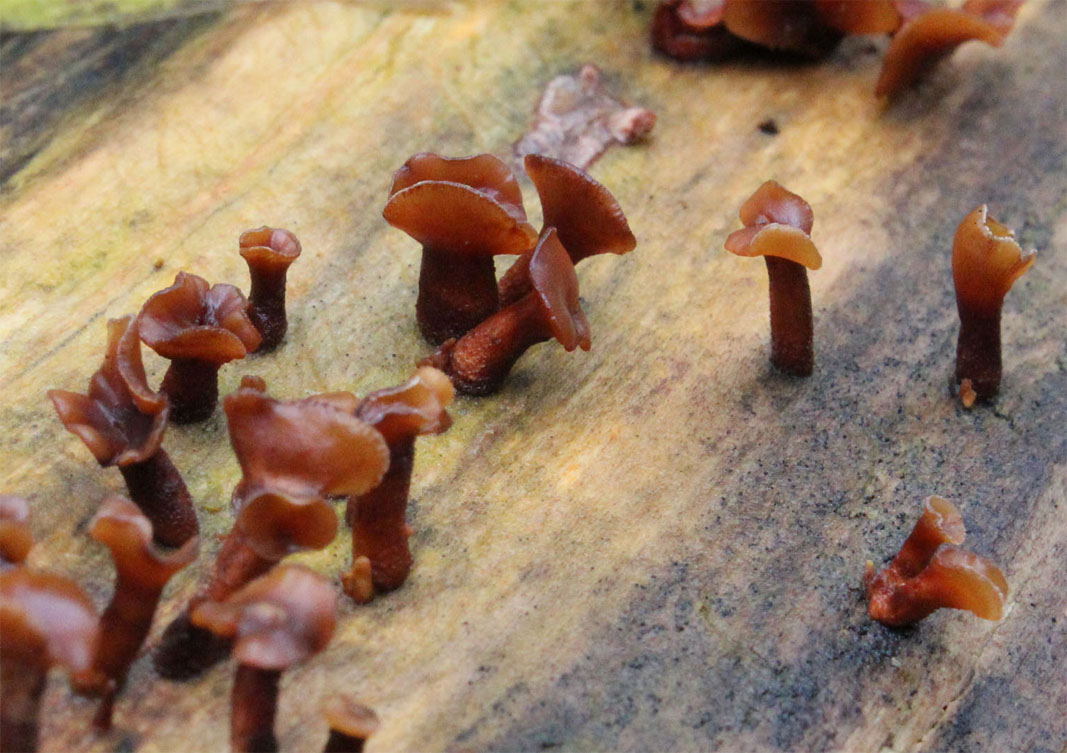

Scientific classification
- Domain: Eukaryota
- Kingdom: Fungi
- Division: Basidiomycota
- Class: Dacrymycetes
- Order: Dacrymycetales
- Family: Dacrymycetaceae
- Genus: Dacryopinax
- Species: D. elegans

Binomial name
- Dacryopinax elegans (Berk. & M.A.Curtis) G.W.Martin (1948)

Synonyms
- Guepinia elegans Berk. & M.A.Curtis (1849)

= Dacryopinax elegans =

Species of jelly fungus

Dacryopinax elegans is a species of jelly fungus in the family Dacrymycetaceae. It was originally formally described as Guepinia elegans by Miles Berkeley and Moses Ashley Curtis in 1849. George Willard Martin transferred it to the genus Dacryopinax in 1948.

The fruit bodies have upside-down cups 3–15 millimetres (1/8–5/8 in) across. Similar species include Guepiniopsis buccina and some in Auricularia.

It appears from June to October in the eastern United States west of New England.
