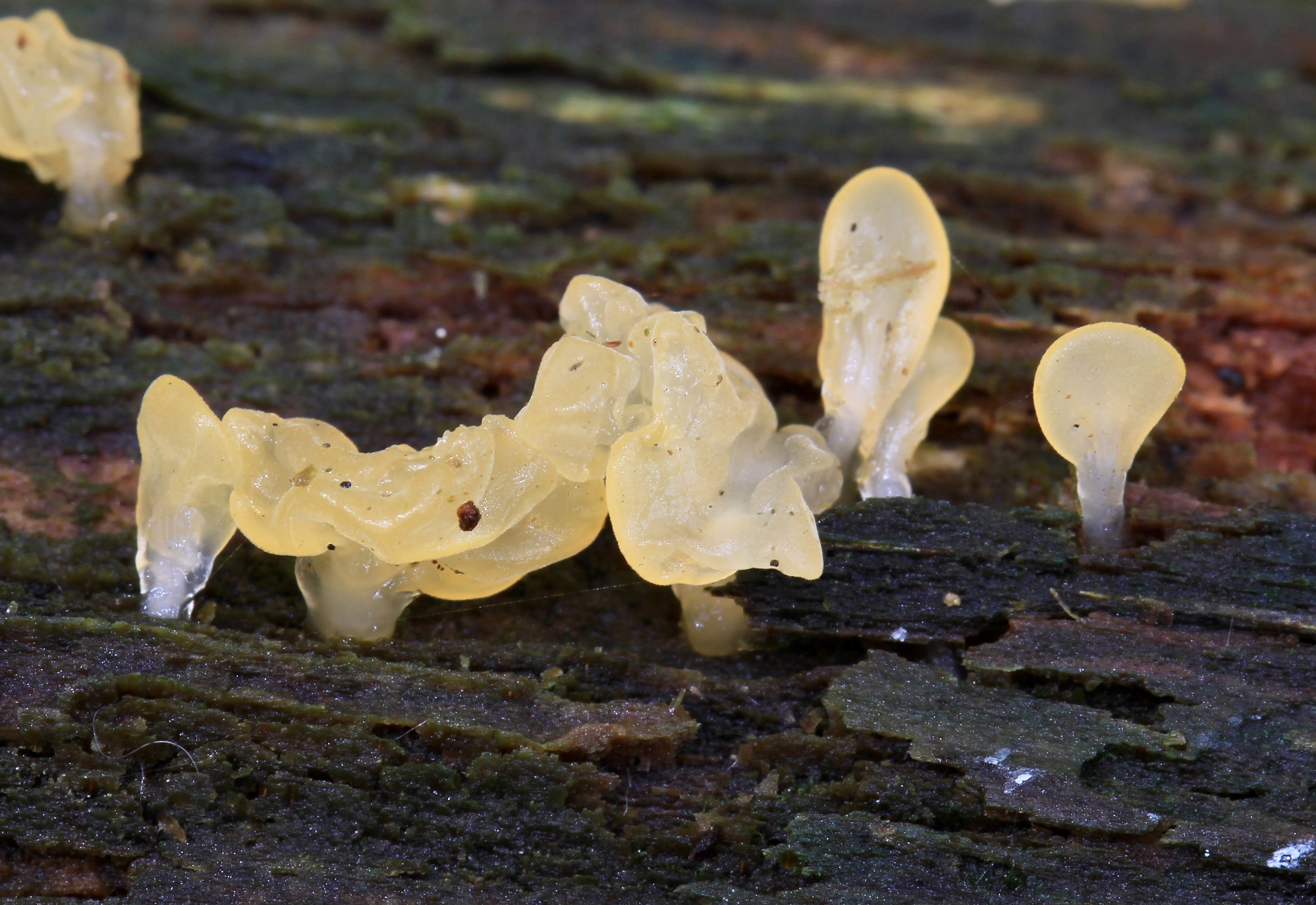

Scientific classification
- Kingdom: Fungi
- Division: Basidiomycota
- Class: Dacrymycetes
- Order: Dacrymycetales
- Family: Dacrymycetaceae
- Genus: Calocera
- Species: C. pallidospathulata

Binomial name
- Calocera pallidospathulata D.A. Reid (1974)

= Calocera pallidospathulata =

Species of fungus

Calocera pallidospathulata is a species of fungus in the family Dacrymycetaceae. In the UK, it has the recommended English name of pale stagshorn. Basidiocarps (fruit bodies) are gelatinous, pale yellow, and spathulate (widening towards the apex). It typically grows on logs and dead wood of both broadleaved trees and conifers. It is mainly found in Great Britain, but has also been recorded from continental Europe.

== Taxonomy ==
The species was originally described from Yorkshire, England in 1974 by British mycologist Derek Reid.

== Description ==
Calocera pallidospathulata forms pale yellowish, gelatinous fruit bodies up to 1 cm tall, comprising a whitish or pallid stalk and a pale yellowish, fertile head that is typically thin, flattened, and spathulate (widening towards the apex). The fruit bodies typically grow gregariously, but do not coalesce.

=== Microscopic characters ===
Hyphae lack clamp connections. The basidia are two-spored and typical of the Dacrymycetaceae. The spores are weakly allantoid (sausage-shaped), 10 to 13 by 3.5 to 4 μm, thin-walled, becoming tardily 1 to 3-septate.

== Habitat and distribution ==
Calocera pallidospathulata is a wood-rotting species, typically found on logs and dead wood of both broadleaved trees and conifers. It was originally described from England and is locally common in Great Britain, but has also been recorded from Belgium, the Netherlands and Norway. Since its initial discovery in Yorkshire, Calocera pallidospathulata has spread rapidly through much of England and into Wales and Scotland. Since the species is conspicuous, it seems probable that it is an invasive introduction from another continent, possibly North America.
