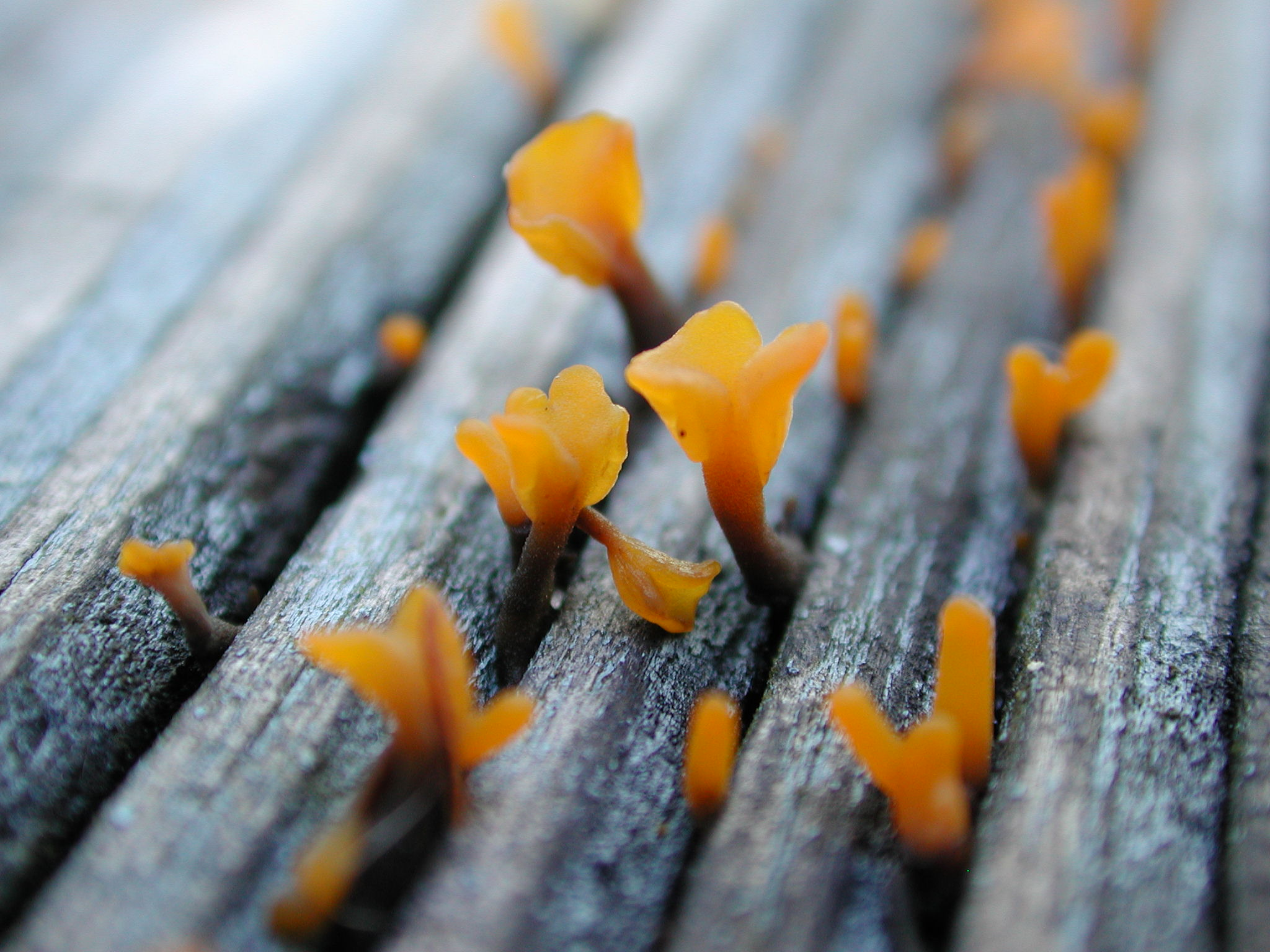
- Dacryopinax spathularia

Scientific classification
- Domain: Eukaryota
- Kingdom: Fungi
- Division: Basidiomycota
- Class: Dacrymycetes
- Order: Dacrymycetales
- Family: Dacrymycetaceae
- Genus: Dacryopinax; G.W.Martin (1948)

Type species
- Dacryopinax elegans (Berk. & M.A.Curtis) G.W.Martin (1948)

Species
- ~15; see text

= Dacryopinax =

Genus of fungi

Dacryopinax is a genus of fungi in the family Dacrymycetaceae. The genus is widespread, especially in tropical regions, and contains about 15 species. Dacryopinax was circumscribed by American mycologist George Willard Martin in 1948. A taxonomic monograph was published by McNabb (1965).

Dacryopinax species are common wood inhabiting fungi worldwide, mostly producing brown rot wood decay. Genomic analysis of Dacryopinax primogenitus revealed the loss of genes for class II peroxidases necessary for lignin degradation, supporting observations of a brown rot physiology.

== Species ==
The genus consists of the following species:

- Dacryopinax aurantiaca
- Dacryopinax crenata
- Dacryopinax dennisii
- Dacryopinax elegans
- Dacryopinax felloi
- Dacryopinax fissus
- Dacryopinax foliacea
- Dacryopinax formosus
- Dacryopinax imazekiana
- Dacryopinax indacocheae
- Dacryopinax lowyi
- Dacryopinax macrospora
- Dacryopinax martinii
- Dacryopinax maxidorii
- Dacryopinax parmastoensis
- Dacryopinax petaliformis
- Dacryopinax primogenitus
- Dacryopinax spathularia
- Dacryopinax sphenocarpa
- Dacryopinax taibaishanensis
- Dacryopinax xizangensis
- Dacryopinax yungensis
