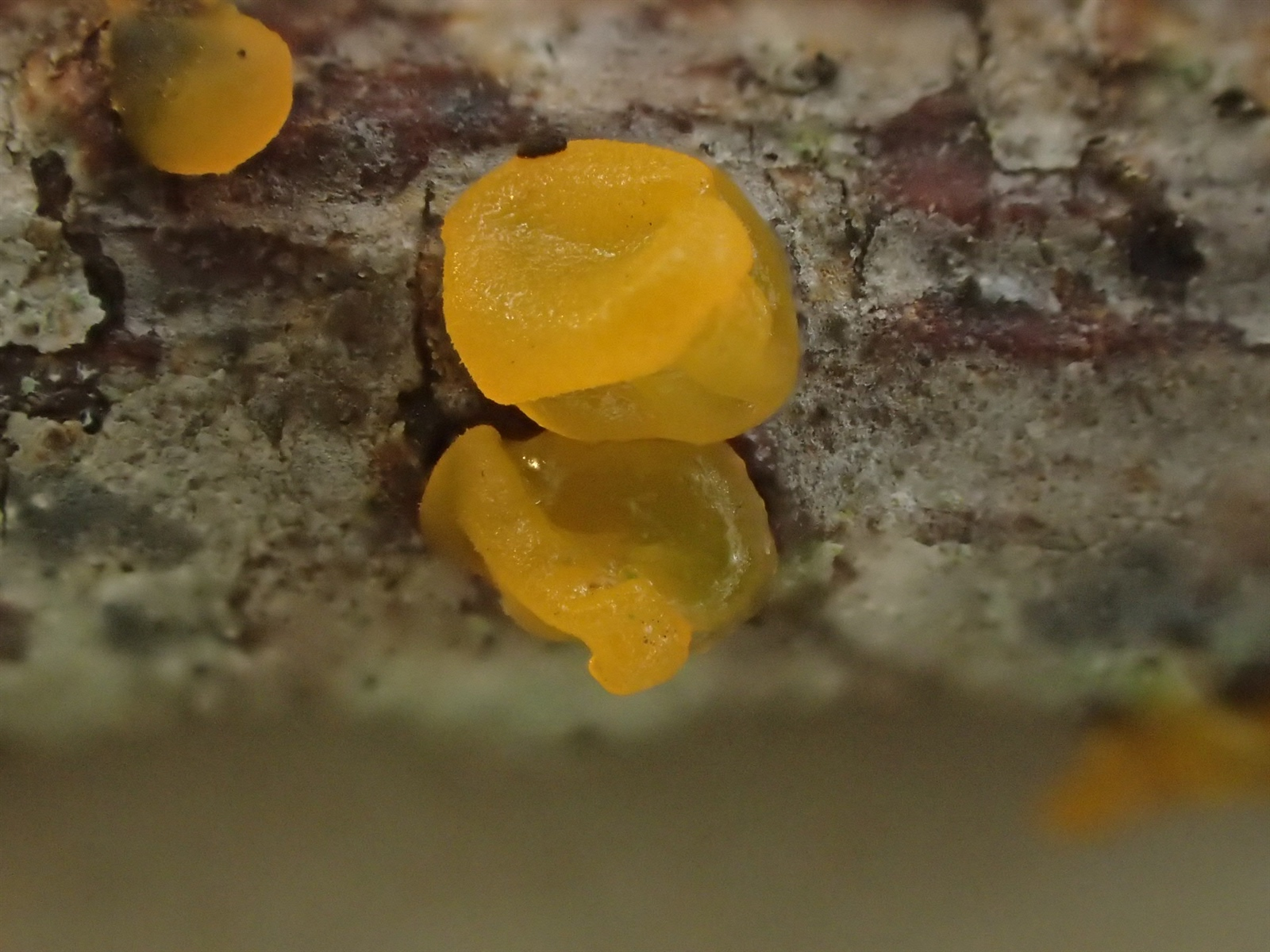

Scientific classification
- Kingdom: Fungi
- Division: Basidiomycota
- Class: Dacrymycetes
- Order: Dacrymycetales
- Family: Dacrymycetaceae
- Genus: Dacrymyces
- Species: D. ovisporus

Binomial name
- Dacrymyces ovisporus Bref. (1888)

= Dacrymyces ovisporus =

Species of fungus

Dacrymyces ovisporus is a species of fungus in the family Dacrymycetaceae. It produces small, gelatinous, bright orange to amber fruit bodies on dead conifer wood. The fungus is characterised by its relatively large, nearly spherical spores that develop multiple internal partitions as they mature. First described in Germany in 1888, D. ovisporus has a widespread but uncommon distribution across North America and Europe, where it contributes to the decomposition of woody debris in boreal and temperate forests.

== Description ==
Dacrymyces ovisporus produces small, clustered fruit bodies (basidiocarps) that begin as tiny pustules 2–4 mm across before coalescing into irregular, convoluted masses attached at a single point on the substrate. Fresh basidiocarps are firm-gelatinous and show a bright orange to amber colour, fading to dark amber or brown when dry. Internally, the fungal hyphae are thin-walled, smooth and embedded in a gelatinous matrix, each bearing a clamp connection where septa occur.

Under the microscope, the hymenium comprises simple, cylindrical dikaryophyses—sterile supporting cells with thick walls and clamp connections—alongside the spore-bearing basidia. The basidia are cylindrical to slightly club-shaped, measuring 40–70 × 5–10 micrometre (μm), and each carries two long sterigmata. Spores (basidiospores) are relatively large (14–20 × 8–11 μm), more or less spherical (subglobose) to broadly oval, thin-walled and apiculate (with a small pointed scar). They initially possess thin, single septa but mature into muriform spores partitioned by transverse, longitudinal and oblique septa. Germination occurs either by extending a germ tube or by forming asexual conidia.

== Habitat and distribution ==
Dacrymyces ovisporus is a saprotrophic fungus that forms its gelatinous basidiocarps exclusively on the dead wood of gymnosperms, particularly conifers. It typically fruits on fallen trunks and branches in boreal and temperate forests, where it contributes to the breakdown of woody debris.

First described by Julius Oscar Brefeld in Germany at the close of the nineteenth century, D. ovisporus has a transatlantic distribution. In North America, it has been collected in Canada, while European records—though few—span Austria, Bulgaria, the Czech Republic, Estonia, Finland, Norway, Poland, Portugal, Scotland, Spain and Sweden. These scattered reports suggest that, despite a wide range, the species remains uncommon in Europe.
