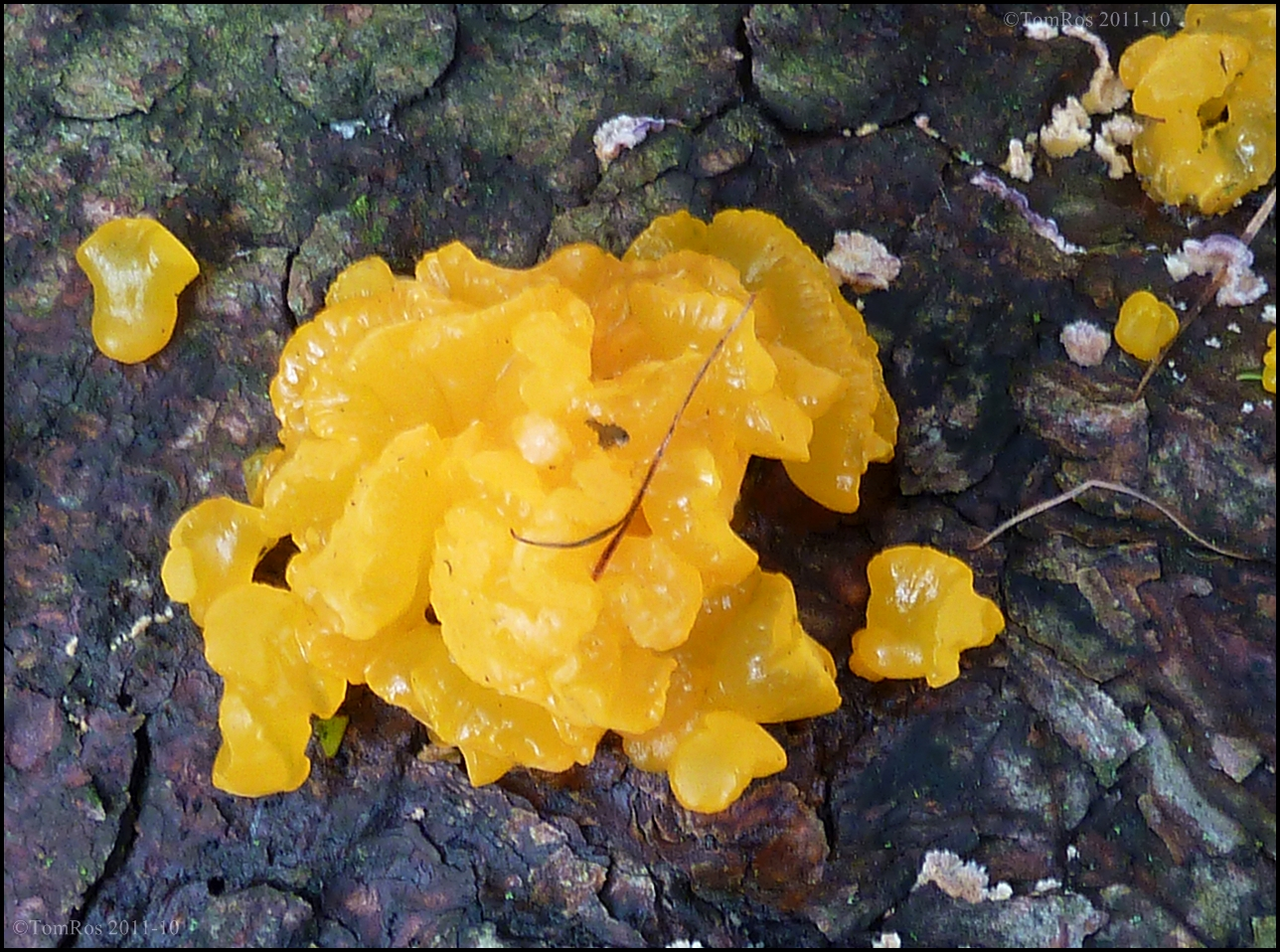
- Dacrymyces chrysospermus, Ontario, Canada

Scientific classification
- Kingdom: Fungi
- Division: Basidiomycota
- Class: Dacrymycetes
- Order: Dacrymycetales
- Family: Dacrymycetaceae
- Genus: Dacrymyces
- Species: D. chrysospermus

Binomial name
- Dacrymyces chrysospermus Berk. & M.A.Curtis (1873)

Synonyms
- Dacrymyces palmatus Bres. 1904; Tremella palmata Schwein. (1832) nom. illegit.

= Dacrymyces chrysospermus =

Species of fungus

Dacrymyces chrysospermus is a species of jelly fungus in the family Dacrymycetaceae. In the UK it has the recommended English name of orange jelly spot; in North America it is known as orange jelly or orange witch's butter.

== Description ==
The species is saprotrophic and grows on dead coniferous wood. The basidiocarps are gelatinous, bright orange, and extremely variable in shape, but typically stoutly stipitate with a spoon- or cup-shaped, spore-bearing head. They are frequently erumpent in groups, often coalescing to form complex masses up to 6 cm (2 1/2 in) across. Microscopically it is distinguished from most other species of Dacrymyces by its comparatively large (18–23 by 6.5–8 μm), 7-septate basidiospores.

=== Similar species ===
Tremella mesenterica and Naematelia aurantia are macroscopically identical to D. chrysospermus but can be distinguished by their growth on hardwood as well as their microscopic characteristics. Despite looking so similar, they belong to a different class of fungi, Tremellomycetes.

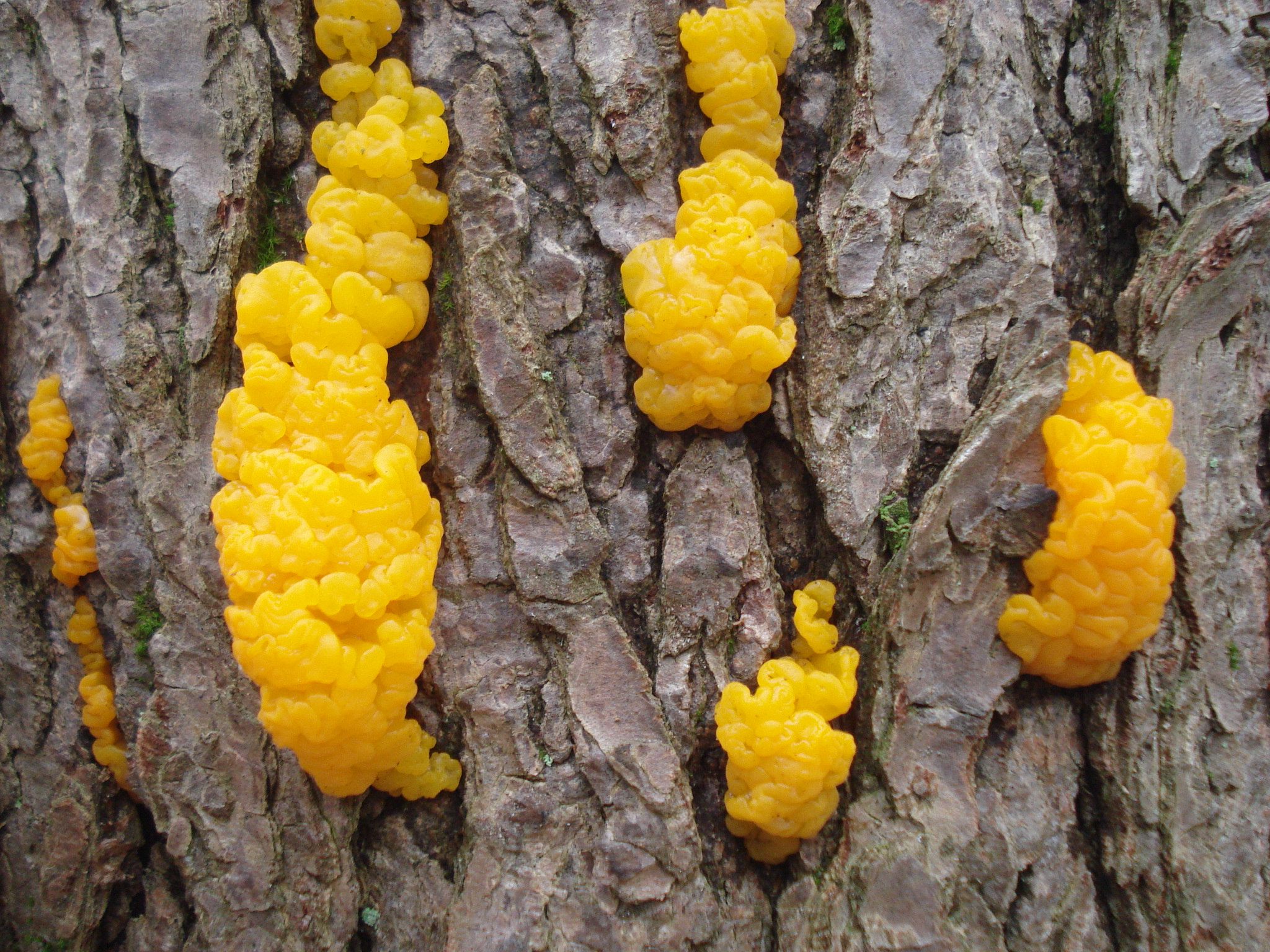
Fruit bodies on hemlock, Pennsylvania

Dacryopinax spathularia and species of Femsjonia can also be similar.

== Distribution ==
Dacrymyces chrysospermus was originally described in New England, but the species is now understood to be distributed worldwide on a variety of conifers. D. chrysospermus is considered common across North America, and specimens have been collected in South America, Europe, Asia, and Australia.
