= Dacryoscyphus =

Scientific classification
- Kingdom: Fungi
- Division: Basidiomycota
- Class: Dacrymycetes
- Order: Dacrymycetales
- Family: Dacrymycetaceae
- Genus: Dacryoscyphus; R.Kirschner & Zhu L.Yang (2005)

Type species
- Dacryoscyphus chrysochilus R.Kirschner & Zhu L.Yang (2005)

Genus of fungi

Dacryoscyphus is a genus of anamorphic fungi in the Dacrymycetales order. The genus is monotypic, containing the single species Dacryoscyphus chrysochilus, found in China. The genus and species were formally described in 2005.
