= Staghorn =

Staghorn may refer to:

- The Horn (anatomy) of a stag
- Xylaria hypoxylon, a fungus commonly called Stag's horn or Candlesnuff
- Calocera viscosa, a fungus commonly called Yellow Stagshorn or Stagshorn Fungus
- Staghorn calculus, a type of kidney stone
- Staghorn coral, a branching coral
- Rhus typhina, a shrub commonly called Staghorn sumac
- Lycopodium clavatum, a moss commonly called Staghorn moss
- Platycerium, a fern commonly called Staghorn fern
- Pacific staghorn sculpin, a type of fish
- Staghorn (He-Man), an action figure from the Mattel
- Struvite, a type of kidney stone, also referred to as Staghorn calculus
