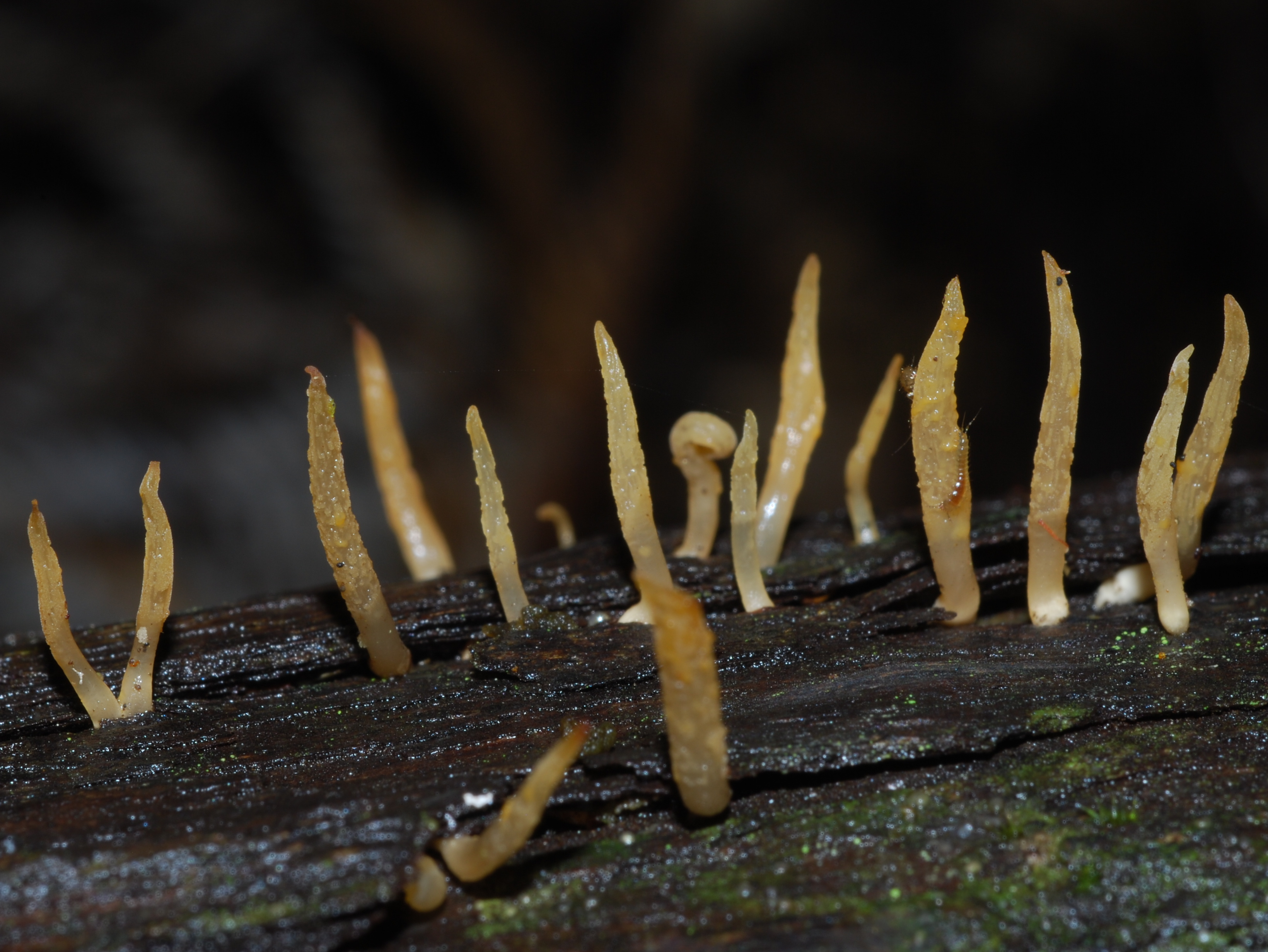

Scientific classification
- Kingdom: Fungi
- Division: Basidiomycota
- Class: Dacrymycetes
- Order: Dacrymycetales
- Family: Dacrymycetaceae
- Genus: Calocera
- Species: C. cornea

Binomial name
- Calocera cornea (Batsch) Fr. (1827)

Synonyms
- Clavaria cornea Batsch (1783); Corynoides cornea (Batsch) Gray (1821); Calocera cornes (Batsch) Fr. (1827)

= Calocera cornea =

Species of fungus

Calocera cornea
- Mycological characteristics
- Smooth hymenium
- No distinct cap
- Hymenium attachment is irregular or not applicable
- Stipe is bare
- Spore print is white
- Ecology is saprotrophic
- Edibility is inedible

Calocera cornea is a jelly fungus that grows on decaying wood. It is a member of the Dacrymycetales, an order of fungi characterized by their unique "tuning fork" basidia.

Its yellow, finger-like, tapering basidiocarps are somewhat gelatinous in texture. In typical specimens the basidiocarps become up to 3 mm in diameter, and 2 cm in height. The hymenium covers the sides of the basidiocarps, each basidium producing and forcibly discharging only two basidiospores.

It is inedible. Calocera viscosa is related.
