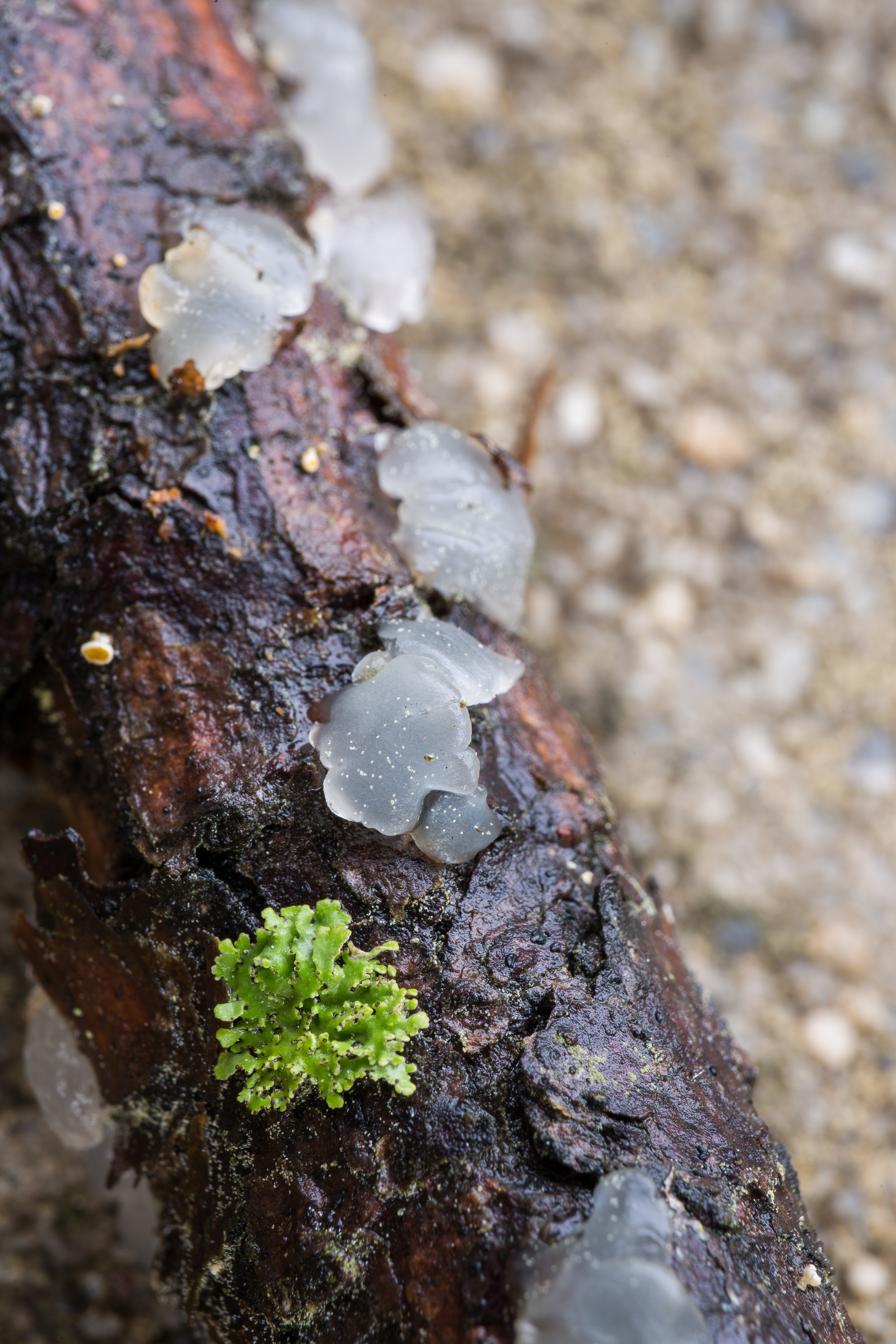
- Cerinomyces tortus, formerly Dacrymyces tortus

Scientific classification
- Kingdom: Fungi
- Division: Basidiomycota
- Class: Dacrymycetes
- Order: Dacrymycetales
- Family: Cerinomycetaceae; Jülich (1982)

Type genus
- Cerinomyces G.W.Martin (1949)

= Cerinomycetaceae =

Class of fungi

The Cerinomycetaceae are a family of fungi in the order Dacrymycetales. The family currently contains the single genus Cerinomyces which has a cosmopolitan distribution.

Species within the Cerinomycetaceae are saprotrophs and occur on dead wood. As originally conceived, the family comprised all species of the Dacrymycetes having effused, corticioid basidiocarps (fruit bodies). Molecular research, based on cladistic analysis of DNA sequences, has however shown that this circumscription is not valid. As a result, the family now contains some (but not all) species having corticioid basidiocarps and some species (previously referred to the Dacrymycetaceae) with gelatinous, pustular basidiocarps.
