= Cerinosterus =

Scientific classification
- Kingdom: Fungi
- Division: Basidiomycota
- Class: Dacrymycetes
- Order: Dacrymycetales
- Family: Dacrymycetaceae
- Genus: Cerinosterus; R.T.Moore (1987)

Type species
- Cerinosterus luteoalbus (de Hoog) R.T.Moore (1987)

Genus of fungi

Cerinosterus is a genus of anamorphic fungi in the order Dacrymycetales. The genus is monotypic, containing the single species Cerinosterus luteoalbus. The species and genus was formally described in 1987. Cerinosterus is similar in morphology to Sporothrix; common features include hyphal septa with dolipores and imperforate parenthesomes.
