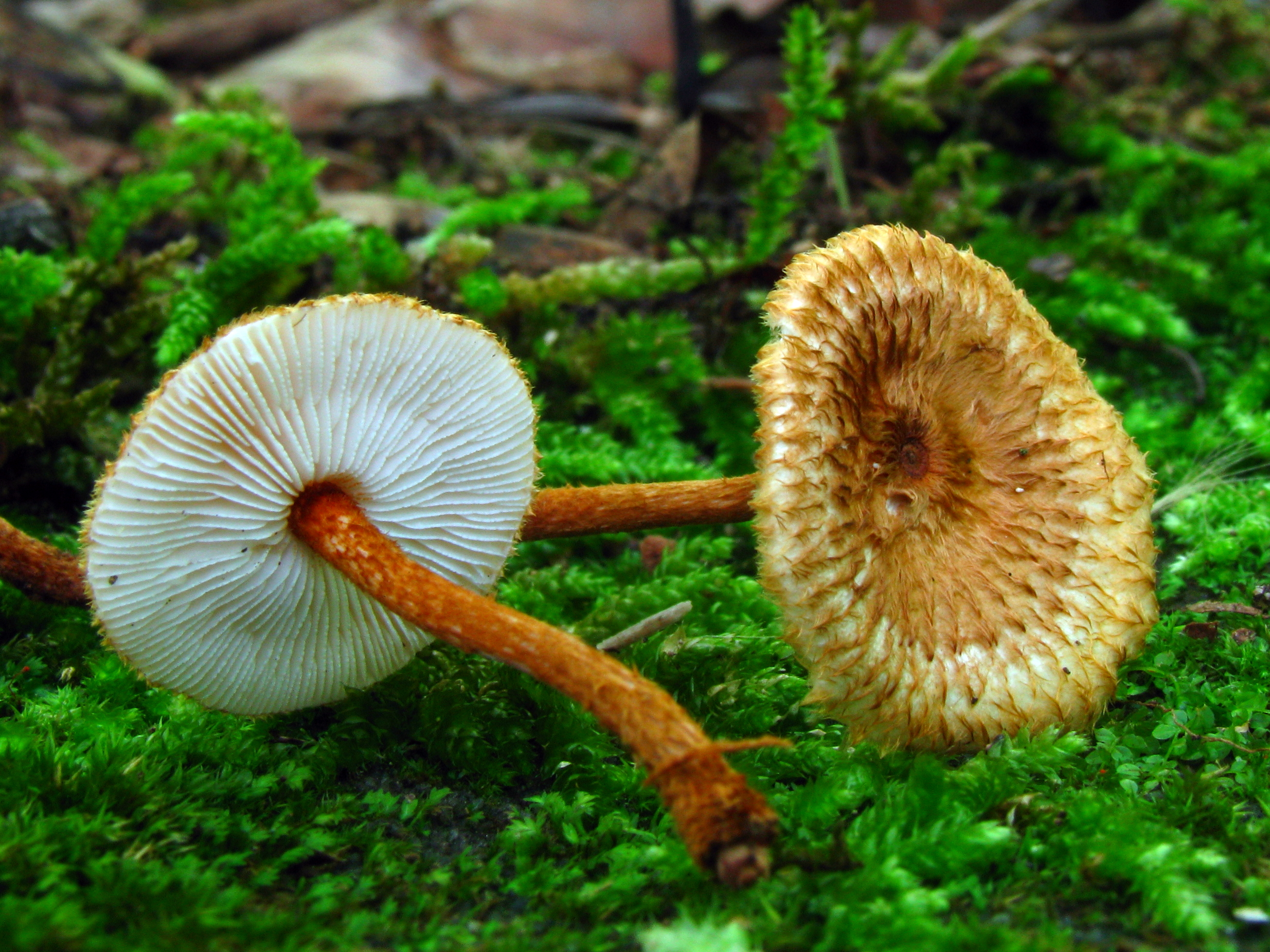
- Crinipellis zonata

Scientific classification
- Domain: Eukaryota
- Kingdom: Fungi
- Division: Basidiomycota
- Class: Agaricomycetes
- Order: Agaricales
- Family: Marasmiaceae
- Genus: Crinipellis; Pat. (1889)

Type species
- Crinipellis stipitaria (Fr.) Pat. (1889)

= Crinipellis =

Genus of fungi

Crinipellis is a genus of fungus in the family Marasmiaceae. The genus has a widespread distribution and contains about 65 species.

== Taxonomy ==
The genus was circumscribed by French mycologist Narcisse Théophile Patouillard in 1889.

=== Species ===
- Crinipellis actinophora
- Crinipellis albipes
- Crinipellis albocapitata
- Crinipellis alcalivirens
- Crinipellis atrovinosa
- Crinipellis australis
- Crinipellis austrorubida
- Crinipellis beninensis
- Crinipellis bisulcata
- Crinipellis brasiliensis
- Crinipellis brunneipurpurea
- Crinipellis brunneoaurantiaca
- Crinipellis brunnescens
- Crinipellis calderi
- Crinipellis calosporus
- Crinipellis campanella
- Crinipellis carecomoeis
- Crinipellis catamarcensis
- Crinipellis cervinoalba
- Crinipellis chrysochaetes
- Crinipellis commixta
- Crinipellis coroicae
- Crinipellis corticalis
- Crinipellis corvina
- Crinipellis cremoricolor
- Crinipellis cupreostipes
- Crinipellis dicotyledonum
- Crinipellis dipterocarpi
- Crinipellis dusenii
- Crinipellis eggersii
- Crinipellis excentrica
- Crinipellis filiformis
- Crinipellis foliicola
- Crinipellis furcata
- Crinipellis galeropsidoides
- Crinipellis ghanaensis
- Crinipellis glaucospora
- Crinipellis goossensiae
- Crinipellis gracilis
- Crinipellis hepatica
- Crinipellis herrerae
- Crinipellis hirticeps
- Crinipellis hygrocyboides
- Crinipellis insignis
- Crinipellis iopus
- Crinipellis kisanganensis
- Crinipellis macrosphaerigera
- Crinipellis malesiana
- Crinipellis mauretanica
- Crinipellis maxima
- Crinipellis megalospora
- Crinipellis metuloidophora
- Crinipellis mexicana
- Crinipellis mezzanensis –Italy
- Crinipellis micropilus
- Crinipellis minutula
- Crinipellis minutuloides
- Crinipellis mirabilis
- Crinipellis missionensis
- Crinipellis molfinoana
- Crinipellis multicolor
- Crinipellis nigricaulis
- Crinipellis nsimalensis
- Crinipellis ochracea
- Crinipellis ochraceopapillata
- Crinipellis omotricha
- Crinipellis pallidibrunnea
- Crinipellis palmarum
- Crinipellis patouillardii
- Crinipellis pedemontana
- Crinipellis perpusilla
- Crinipellis phyllophila
- Crinipellis piceae
- Crinipellis podocarpi
- Crinipellis procera
- Crinipellis pseudopalmarum
- Crinipellis pseudosplachnoides
- Crinipellis pseudostipitaria
- Crinipellis purpurea
- Crinipellis rhizomaticola
- Crinipellis rhizomorphica
- Crinipellis roseola
- Crinipellis roseorubella
- Crinipellis rubella
- Crinipellis rubida
- Crinipellis rubiginosa
- Crinipellis rustica
- Crinipellis sapindacearum
- Crinipellis sardoa
- Crinipellis sarmentosa
- Crinipellis scabella
- Crinipellis schevczenkoi
- Crinipellis schini
- Crinipellis septotricha
- Crinipellis sinensis
- Crinipellis siparunae
- Crinipellis squamosa
- Crinipellis stupparia
- Crinipellis substipitaria
- Crinipellis subtomentosa
- Crinipellis tabtim
- Crinipellis tenuipilosa
- Crinipellis ticoi
- Crinipellis tomentosa
- Crinipellis trichialis
- Crinipellis trinitatis
- Crinipellis tucumanensis
- Crinipellis urbica
- Crinipellis velutipes

== See also ==
- List of Marasmiaceae genera
