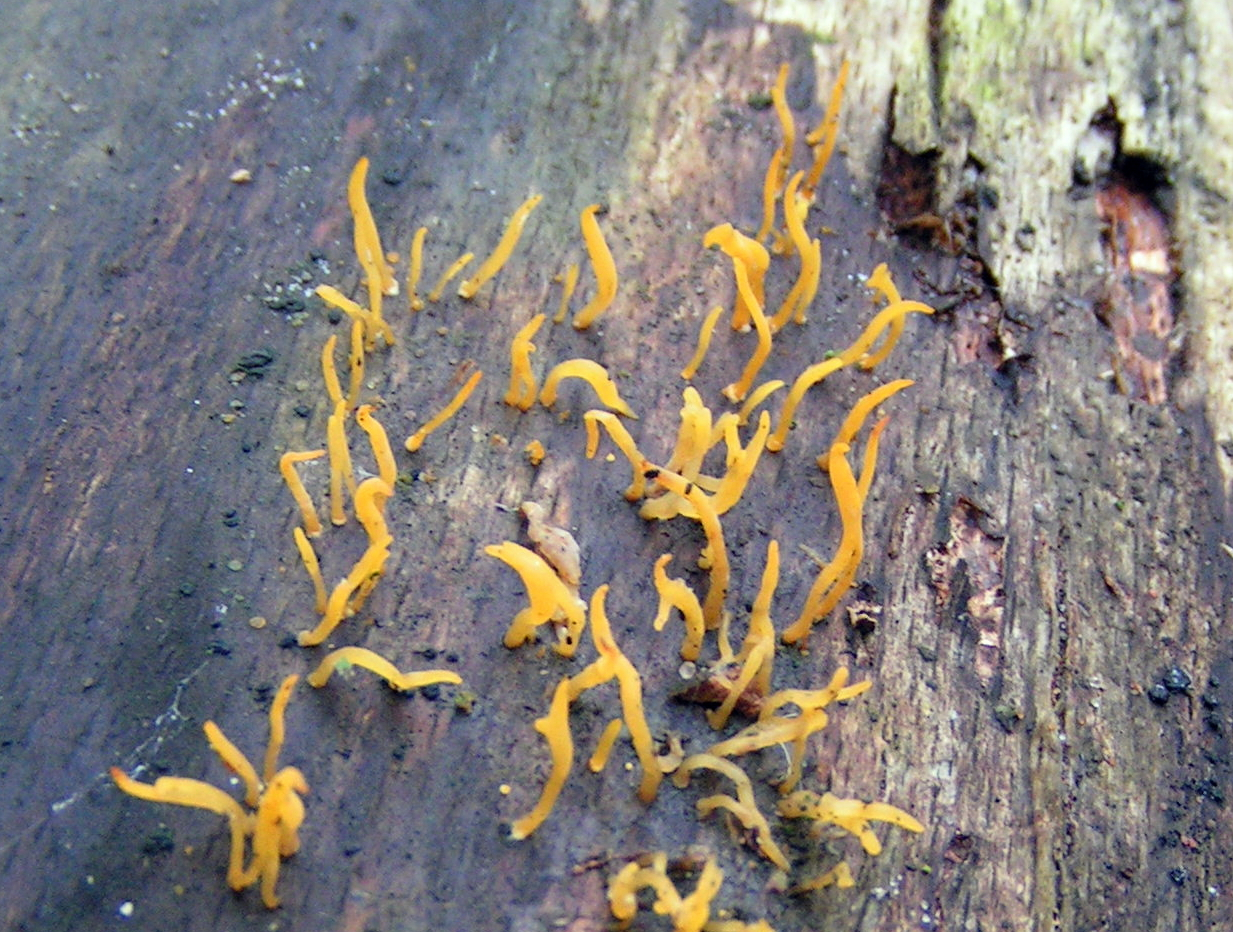
- Calocera cornea growing on a log

Scientific classification
- Domain: Eukaryota
- Kingdom: Fungi
- Division: Basidiomycota
- Class: Dacrymycetes
- Order: Dacrymycetales
- Family: Dacrymycetaceae
- Genus: Calocera (Fr.) Fr. (1825)

Type species
- Clavaria viscosa (Pers.) Fr. (1827)

Species
- 15, see text

Synonyms
- Clavaria subgen. Calocera Fr. (1821) Caloceras Fr. ex Wallr. (1833); Dacryomitra Tul. & C.Tul. (1872)

= Calocera =

Genus of fungi

Calocera is a fungal genus in the Dacrymycetes order. It is widely distributed and contains 15 species.

== Etymology ==
Calocera is derived from the Greek words kalós, "beautiful", and kéras, "horn". In English it is called stagshorn, which also describes its similarity with the horn of an animal.

== Species ==
- Calocera australis
- Calocera bambusicola
- Calocera clavata
- Calocera cornea
- Calocera furcata
- Calocera fusca
- Calocera glossoides
- Calocera guepinioides
- Calocera lutea
- Calocera pallidospathulata
- Calocera sinensis
- Calocera viscosa
