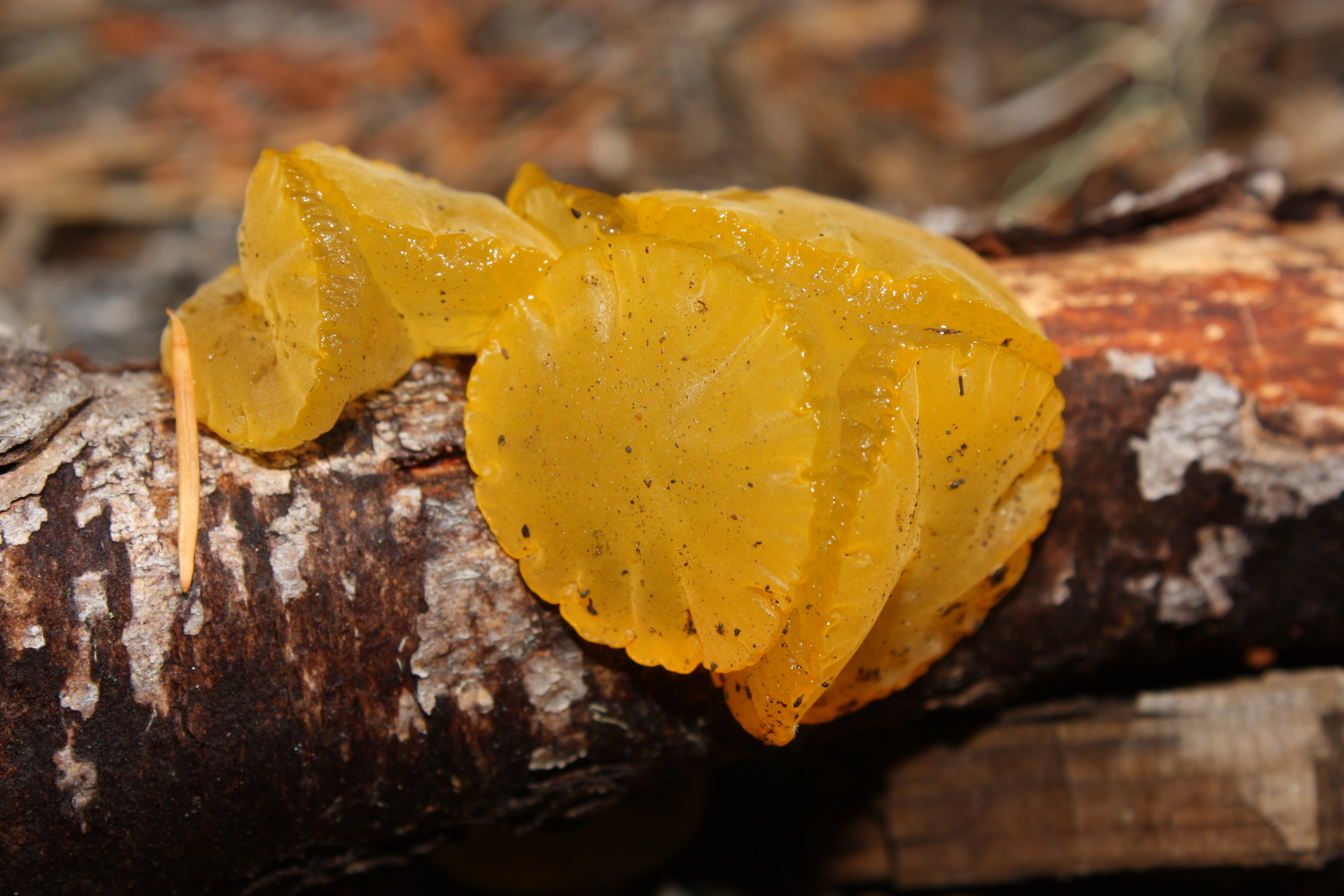
- Guepiniopsis alpina

Scientific classification
- Kingdom: Fungi
- Division: Basidiomycota
- Class: Dacrymycetes
- Order: Dacrymycetales
- Family: Dacrymycetaceae
- Genus: Guepiniopsis; Pat. (1883)

Type species
- Guepiniopsis tortus Pat. (1883)

Species
- G. alpina; G. buccina; G. estonica; G. fulva; G. oresbia; G. ovispora; G. pedunculata; G. suecica; G. tortus

= Guepiniopsis =

Genus of fungi

Guepiniopsis is a genus of fungi in the family Dacrymycetaceae. The genus contains about seven widely distributed species. Guepiniopsis was circumscribed by Narcisse Théophile Patouillard in 1883.
