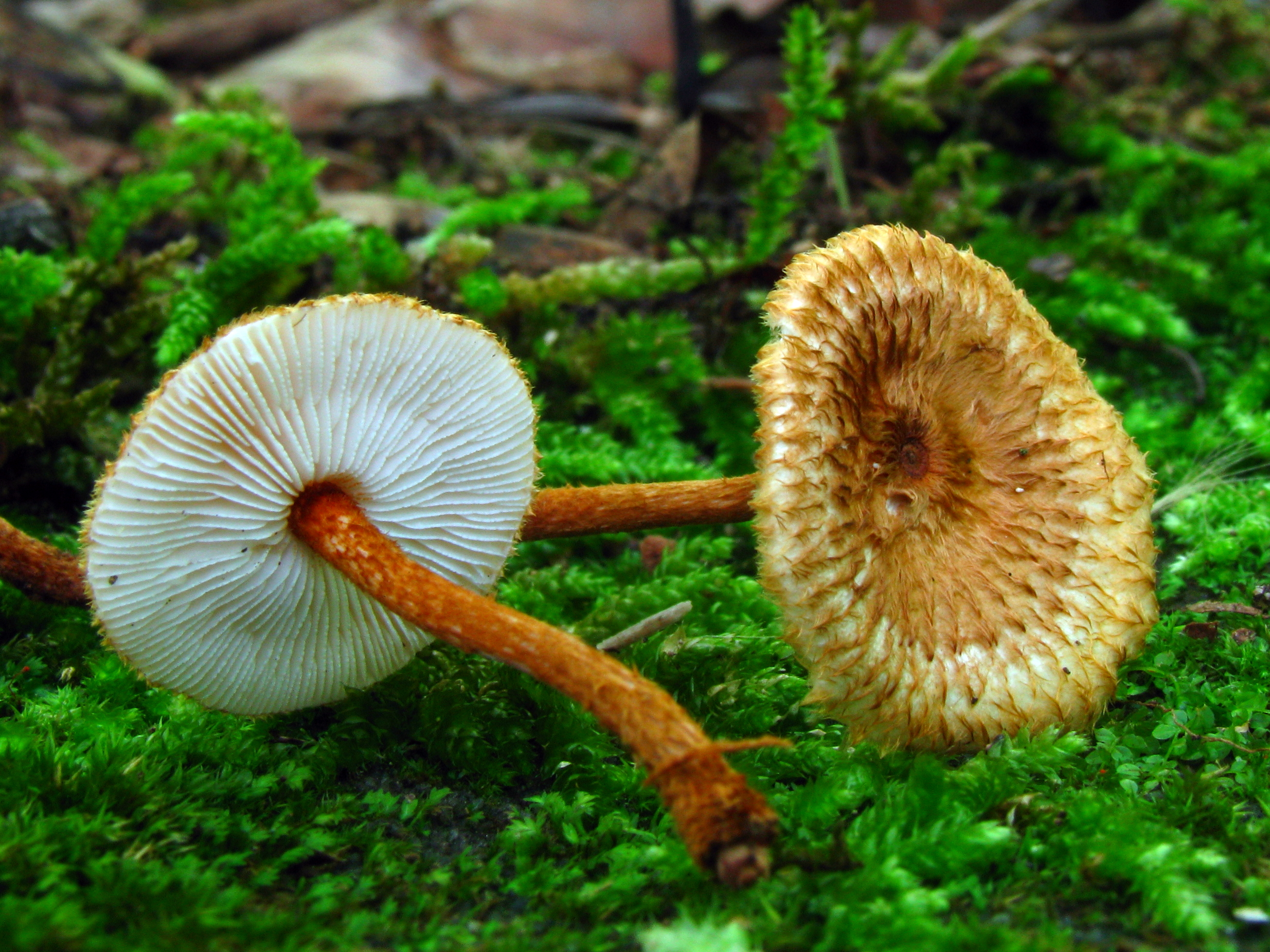

Scientific classification
- Kingdom: Fungi
- Division: Basidiomycota
- Class: Agaricomycetes
- Order: Agaricales
- Family: Marasmiaceae
- Genus: Crinipellis
- Species: C. zonata

Binomial name
- Crinipellis zonata (Peck.) Sacc.

Synonyms
- Agaricus zonatus Peck (1872); Collybia zonata (Peck) Peck (1896)

= Crinipellis zonata =

Species of fungus

Crinipellis zonata
- Mycological characteristics
- Gills on hymenium
- Cap is convex or flat
- Hymenium is free
- Stipe is bare
- Spore print is white
- Ecology is saprotrophic
- Edibility is unknown

Crinipellis zonata, commonly known as the zoned crinipellis or the zoned-cap collybia, is a species of gilled mushroom in the family Marasmiaceae. It is a little brown mushroom, distinctive because of its thick covering of coarse hairs, and differentiated from other members of Crinipellis by its slightly larger cap size, which reaches up to 25 mm (1.0 in) in diameter. The white gills on the underside of the cap are crowded closely together, and are free from attachment to the stem.

Saprobic, it grows on the dead wood of deciduous trees from late summer to autumn. The fungus is found commonly in eastern North America, but has also been collected in Portugal and Korea. The variety C. zonata var. cremoricolor, found in eastern North America, may be distinguished microscopically by its longer spores. The species is of unknown edibility.

== Taxonomy ==
The species was first named as Agaricus zonatus by American mycologist Charles Horton Peck in 1872, based on specimens found near Albany, New York. He later transferred it to the genus Collybia in 1896. It was given its current name by the Italian botanist Pier Andrea Saccardo.

Crinipellis zonata is classified in subsection Crinipellis of section Crinipellis in the genus Crinipellis, according to Rolf Singer's 1986 arrangement of the Agaricales. Species in this subsection have elongated spores, and typically lack cystidia on the sides of gills. A 2009 phylogenetic analysis of several Crinipellis and Moniliophthora species (Moniliophthora are anamorphic fungi parasitic on cocoa and previously included in Crinipellis) demonstrated that C. zonata formed a clade with C. rhizomaticola, C. scabella, and C. nigricaulis. The conclusions of this analysis, based on the DNA sequences of ribosomal DNA coding for internal transcribed spacers, are inconsistent with the morphology-based classification given by Singer.

The mushroom is commonly known as the "zoned Crinipellis" or the "zoned-cap Collybia".

== Description ==
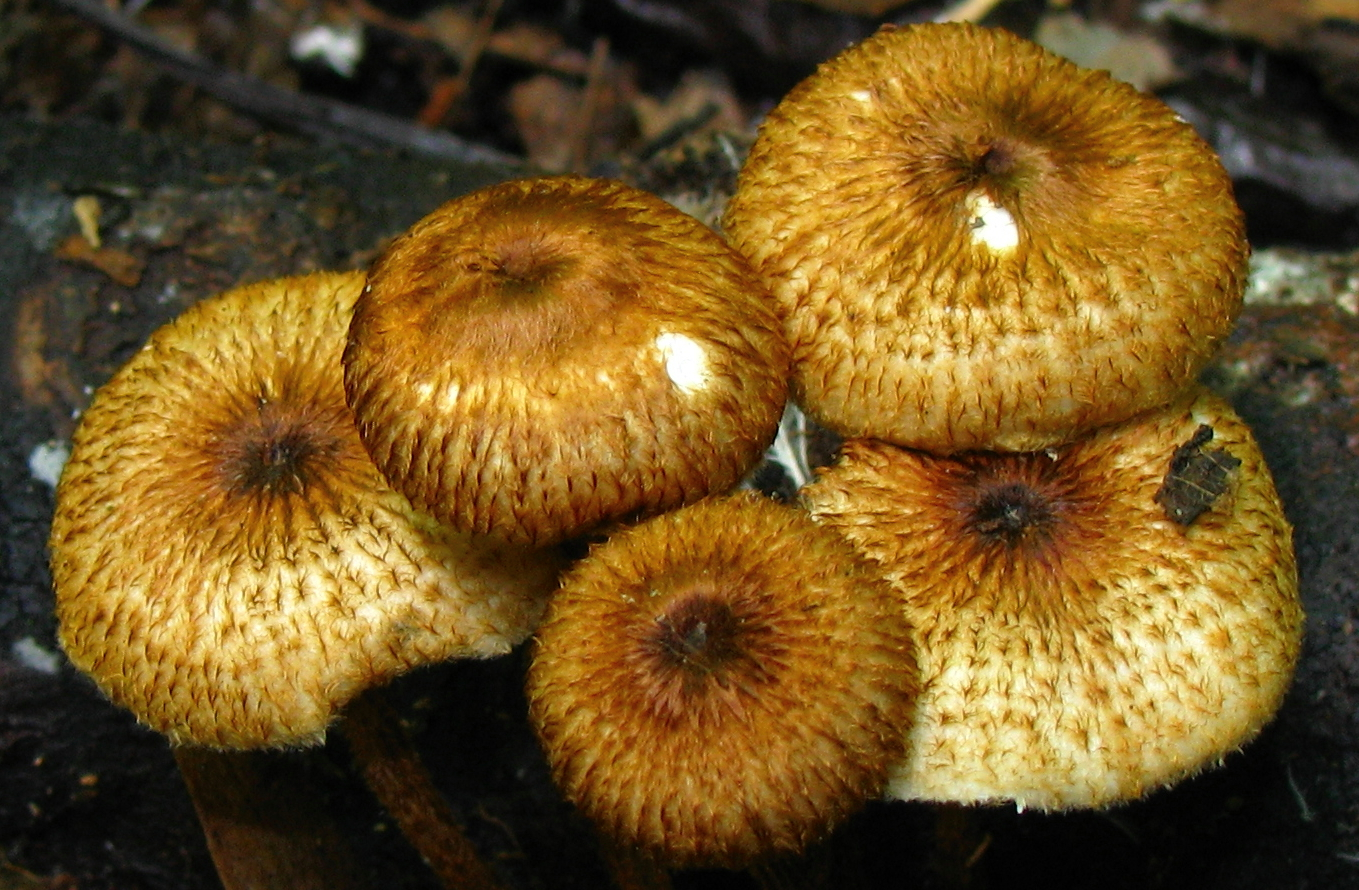
Fruit bodies can grow in small clusters on decaying hardwood.

Crinipellis zonata is a little brown mushroom with a cap of 1 to 2.5 cm (0.4 to 1.0 in) in diameter, which is convex (sometimes approaching flat) in shape. Typically, it has a small, distinctive depression in the centre, while the whole cap is densely hairy and dry. There are often concentric zones of both color and texture. The cap is tawny or cream, while the hairs (which are set in lines) are tawny. The white gills are close and narrow, and free or nearly free from the stem. The gills do not discolor. The stem is between 25 and 50 mm (1.0 and 2.0 in) in height, by 1 to 2 mm (0.04 to 0.08 in) thick. Like the cap, it is densely covered in tawny hairs. Although the stem is hollow, the cap has an insubstantial layer of white flesh.

The spore print is white, and the smooth, elliptical spores are 4–6 by 3–5 μm in size. The basidia (spore-bearing cells) are four-spored, club-shaped, and measure 25–30 by 6.0–6.5 μm. C. zonata has basidioles—basidium-like cells in the hymenium that lack the slender projections known as sterigmata that attach to spores. The basidioles are 15–28 by 3.0–8.0 μm, and range in shape from club-shaped to cylindrical to fusoid (fuse-like). The cheilocystidia (cystidia found on the edges of gills) are 20–45 by 5.0–9.0 μm, cylindrical, club-shaped or fusoid, irregular, and branched or coral-like. Pleurocystidia (cystidia found on the gill face) are absent. The "hairs" on the cap surface are about 50–800 by 4.0–10 μm, and roughly cylindrical with an irregular base; the hairs on the stem are similar to the cap hairs. The cap and stem hairs are dextrinoid, meaning that they are stained yellowish-brown or reddish-brown by the iodine of Melzer's reagent. Clamp connections are present in all tissues.

=== Variety cremoricolor ===
In 1989, Scott Redhead reduced the species Crinipellis cremoricolor (originally described by Robert L. Shaffer and Margaret G. Weaver in 1965, based on specimens found near the University of Michigan Biological Station) to a variety of C. crinipellis. The variety cremoricolor is found in eastern North America and has longer spores than the nominate variety, measuring 7–12 by 3.8–5 μm. According to Shaffer and Weaver, it differs macroscopically from the typical variety in having cream- to buff-colored cap and stem, and pale pinkish-cinnamon gills.

=== Similar species ===
Though similar in appearance to other members of Crinipellis, such as C. stipitaria and C. piceae, C. zonata has a slightly larger cap. The Ghanaian species Crinipellis ghanaensis is also similar, but may be distinguished by its lighter-colored cap without a "corrugated appearance", and its distribution.

== Distribution and ecology ==
Crinipellis zonata is saprobic, living on the debris or roots of hardwoods; it contains wood-decaying enzymes that can break down the polycyclic aromatic hydrocarbon pyrene. The mushrooms grow individually or in small clusters, and is found between August and September. In North America, it is distributed east of the Rocky Mountains, and has been recorded as far west as Indiana and Texas. In Europe, it has been collected in Portugal. It has also been collected in South Korea.

== Edibility ==
Fruit bodies of Crinipellis zonata have no distinct odor, and a mild to slightly mealy taste. Though the edibility is not known with certainty, author Roger Phillips lists the species as "Poisonous/Suspect", and Orson K. Miller Jr. lists it as nonpoisonous.
