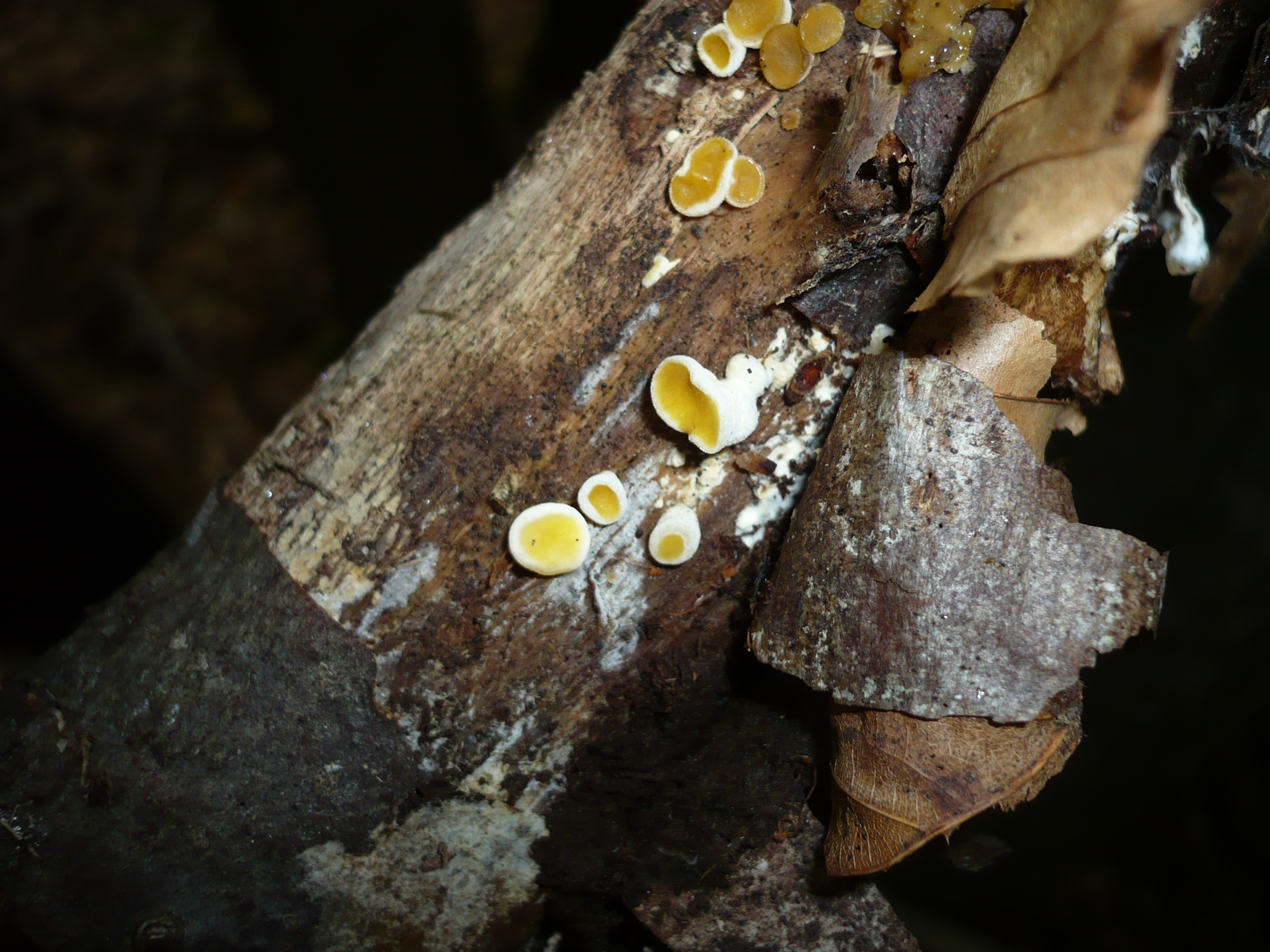
- Ditiola peziziformis

Scientific classification
- Kingdom: Fungi
- Division: Basidiomycota
- Class: Dacrymycetes
- Order: Dacrymycetales
- Family: Dacrymycetaceae
- Genus: Ditiola; Fr. (1822)

Type species
- Ditiola radicata (Alb. & Schwein.) Fr. (1822)

Species
- D. abieticola D. brasiliensis D. coccinea D. obliqua D. orientalis D. peziziformis D. radicata

= Ditiola =

Genus of fungi

Ditiola is a genus of fungi in the family Dacrymycetaceae. The genus contains about 10 widely distributed species. Ditiola was circumscribed by Elias Fries in 1822.
