= Dacryonaemataceae =

Scientific classification
- Kingdom: Fungi
- Division: Basidiomycota
- Class: Dacrymycetes
- Order: Dacrymycetales
- Family: Dacryonaemataceae; J.C. Zamora & S. Ekman (2020)

Type genus
- Dacryonaema Nannf. (1947)

Class of fungi

The Dacryonaemataceae are a family of fungi in the order Dacrymycetales. The family currently contains the single genus Dacryonaema with three known species from Europe and North America.
