= Crinipellis sarmentosa =

Scientific classification
- Kingdom: Fungi
- Division: Basidiomycota
- Class: Agaricomycetes
- Order: Agaricales
- Family: Marasmiaceae
- Genus: Crinipellis
- Species: C. sarmentosa

Binomial name
- Crinipellis sarmentosa (Berk.) Singer [as 'sarmentosus']

Species of fungus

Crinipellis sarmentosa, commonly known as Falso escoba, is a species of fungus in the family Marasmiaceae. It is a plant pathogen.
