= Unilacrymaceae =

Scientific classification
- Kingdom: Fungi
- Division: Basidiomycota
- Class: Dacrymycetes
- Order: Dacrymycetales
- Family: Unilacrymaceae; Shirouzu, Tokum. & Oberw. (2013)

Type genus
- Unilacryma Shirouzu, Tokum. & Oberw. (2013)

Class of fungi

The Unilacrymaceae are a family of fungi in the order Dacrymycetales. The family currently contains the single genus Unilacryma with two known species from Europe, North Asia, and North America. The family was originally placed within its own order, the Unilacrymales, but subsequent research suggests it is better accommodated within the Dacrymycetales.

As with other members of the Dacrymycetes, species within the Unilacrymaceae are saprotrophs, occur on dead wood, and have gelatinous basidiocarps. Microscopically all species have clamped hyphae, branched hyphidia, and muriform (multiseptate), subglobose to ellipsoid basidiospores. Unilacryma unispora is unique within the Dacrymycetes in having single-spored basidia.
