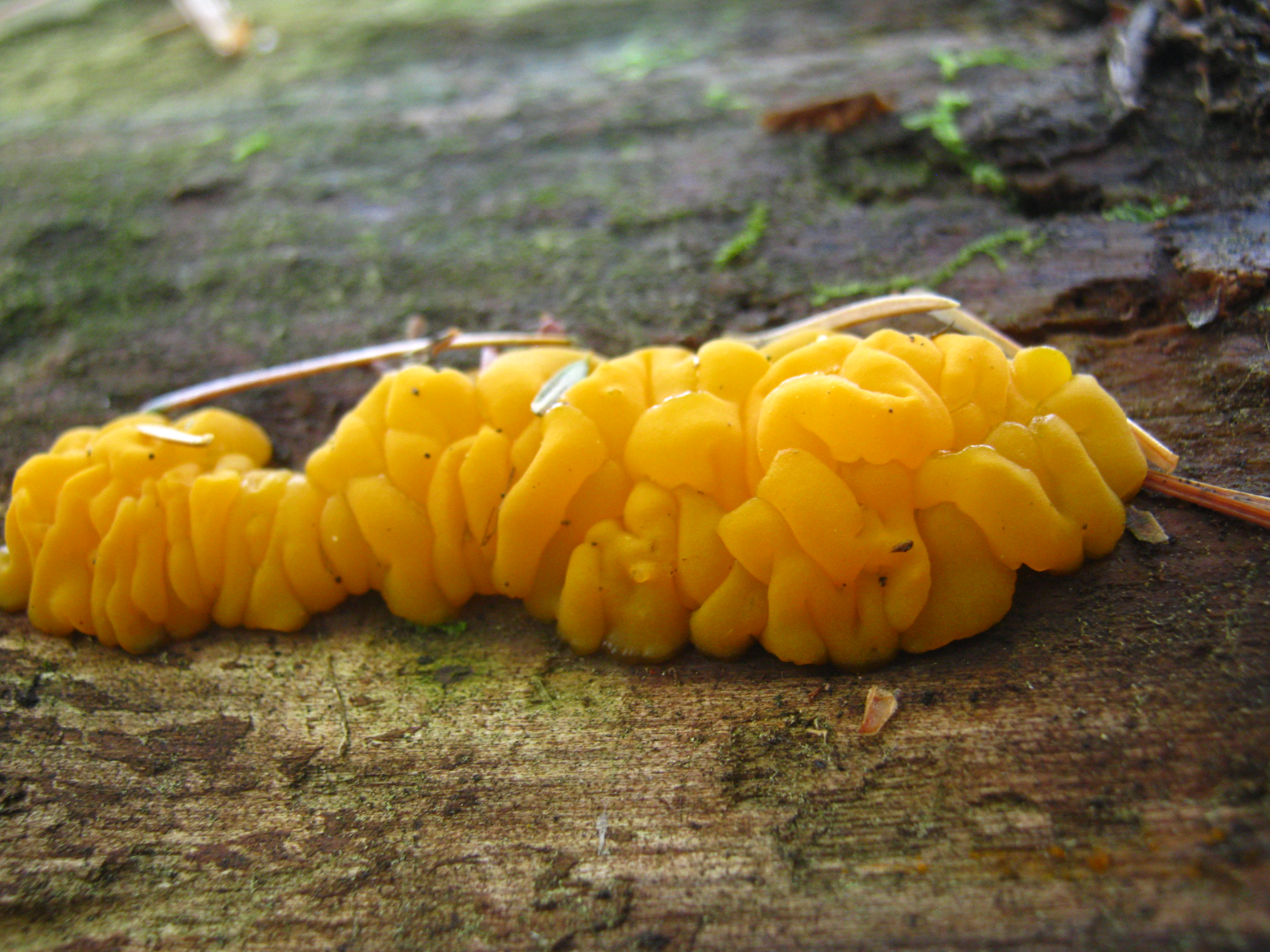
- Dacrymyces chrysospermus

Scientific classification
- Kingdom: Fungi
- Division: Basidiomycota
- Class: Dacrymycetes
- Order: Dacrymycetales
- Family: Dacrymycetaceae
- Genus: Dacrymyces; Nees (1817)

Type species
- Dacrymyces stillatus Nees (1817)

Species
- ~60, see text

Synonyms
- Hydromycus Raf. (1808)

= Dacrymyces =

Genus of fungi

Dacrymyces is a genus of fungi in the family Dacrymycetaceae. Species are saprotrophs and occur on dead wood. Their distribution is worldwide. Basidiocarps (fruit bodies) are ceraceous to gelatinous, often yellow to orange, and typically disc-shaped to cushion-shaped.

The genus has traditionally been differentiated from other genera in the Dacrymycetaceae on the basis of basidiocarp morphology, following (in recent years) the monograph of New Zealand mycologist Robert McNabb. Molecular research, based on cladistic analysis of DNA sequences, has however shown that morphology is not a good indicator of natural relationships within the Dacrymycetaceae. As a result, several species formerly referred to Dacrymyces have been moved to Dacryonaema or Dendrodacrys.

== Species ==
- Dacrymyces adpressus
- Dacrymyces albidus
- Dacrymyces ancyleus
- Dacrymyces ancoratus
- Dacrymyces aquaticus
- Dacrymyces aureosporus
- Dacrymyces australis
- Dacrymyces capitatus
- Dacrymyces ceraceus
- Dacrymyces chiangraiensis
- Dacrymyces chrysocomus
- Dacrymyces chrysospermus
- Dacrymyces citrinus
- Dacrymyces cokeri
- Dacrymyces confluens
- Dacrymyces corticioides
- Dacrymyces coryneoides
- Dacrymyces cupularis
- Dacrymyces cylindricus
- Dacrymyces cyrtosporus
- Dacrymyces dacryomitriformis
- Dacrymyces dictyosporus
- Dacrymyces duii
- Dacrymyces enatus
- Dacrymyces estonicus
- Dacrymyces falcatus
- Dacrymyces flabelliformis
- Dacrymyces grandinioides
- Dacrymyces intermedius
- Dacrymyces invisibilis
- Dacrymyces kobayasii
- Dacrymyces kohyasanus
- Dacrymyces lacrymalis
- Dacrymyces longistipitatus
- Dacrymyces marginatus
- Dacrymyces microsporus
- Dacrymyces minor
- Dacrymyces minutus
- Dacrymyces nigrescens
- Dacrymyces novae-zelandiae
- Dacrymyces olivei
- Dacrymyces ovisporus
- Dacrymyces pachysporus
- Dacrymyces parastenosporus
- Dacrymyces pedunculatus
- Dacrymyces pinacearum
- Dacrymyces pulchrus
- Dacrymyces punctiformis
- Dacrymyces san-augustinii
- Dacrymyces sichuanensis
- Dacrymyces stenosporus
- Dacrymyces stillatus
- Dacrymyces subantarcticensis
- Dacrymyces subarcticus
- Dacrymyces suecicus
- Dacrymyces tortus
- Dacrymyces variisporus
- Dacrymyces yunnanensis
