= Dacryonaema =

Scientific classification
- Kingdom: Fungi
- Division: Basidiomycota
- Class: Dacrymycetes
- Order: Dacrymycetales
- Family: Dacryonaemataceae
- Genus: Dacryonaema; Nannf. (1947)

Type species
- Dacryonaema rufum

Species
- Dacryonaema macnabbii Dacryonaema macrosporum

Class of fungi

Dacryonaema is a genus of fungi in the order Dacrymycetales. As with other members of the Dacrymycetes, species of Dacryonaema are saprotrophs, occur on dead wood, and have gelatinous basidiocarps. Microscopically all species have clamped hyphae and branched hyphidia.

The genus was originally described in 1947 by Swedish mycologist John Axel Nannfeldt, based on the single species Dacryonaema rufum which produces immature basidiocarps that are elongated, conical, and dark reddish brown, quite unlike those of other genera in the Dacrymycetes. Molecular research, based on cladistic analysis of DNA sequences, has confirmed Dacryonaema as monophyletic (a natural taxon) and added two further species to the genus both of which have more conventional pustular or disc-shaped basidiocarps. The genus is known from Europe and North America.
