= Crinipellis rhizomaticola =

Scientific classification
- Domain: Eukaryota
- Kingdom: Fungi
- Division: Basidiomycota
- Class: Agaricomycetes
- Order: Agaricales
- Family: Marasmiaceae
- Genus: Crinipellis
- Species: C. rhizomaticola

Binomial name
- Crinipellis rhizomaticola Antonín, R.Ryoo & H.D.Shin (2009)

Species of fungus

Crinipellis rhizomaticola is a species of fungus in the family Marasmiaceae. Found in Korea, where it grows in open woodland with Japanese red pine (Pinus densiflora), the fungus was described as a new species in 2009.
