= Charles Fuller Baker =

American entomologist

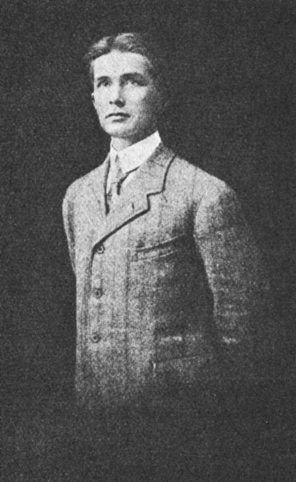
Charles Fuller Baker

Charles Fuller Baker (March 22, 1872 – July 22, 1927) was an American entomologist, botanist, agronomist and plant collector. He was the second dean of the University of the Philippines College of Agriculture, now part of the University of the Philippines Los Baños.

Baker was born in Lansing, Michigan, to Joseph Stannard and Alice Potter. He was a brother of Ray Stannard Baker. He was educated at Michigan Agricultural College where he received a degree in 1892 under A.J. Cook. He then worked with the Colorado Agricultural Experiment Station at Fort Collins especially researching the Hemiptera. He joined the H.H. Smith expedition to Colombia in 1898–99, collecting plants. Baker issued several exsiccatae, among them Plants of Southern Colorado together with Franklin Sumner Earle and Samuel Mills Tracy.John Michael Holzinger distributed the exsiccata-like series Mosses of Colorado. Distributed by J. M. Holzinger: collected by Carl F. Baker 1896 with specimens collected by him. In 1903 he received an MS from Stanford University and then taught at Pomona College and during this time worked on the Invertebrata Pacifica series. He worked in Santiago de las Vegas, Cuba from 1904 to 1907 at the agronomy research station there and then briefly at Para in Brazil. In 1912 he worked at the College of Agriculture, Los Baños in the Philippines as a professor and dean. He worked briefly at the Singapore botanical gardens in 1917. He died at Manila from chronic dysentery and is buried in the college at Los Baños. His collections of fungi were destroyed during the Japanese invasion of the Philippines during World War II. His collections of nearly 400,000 insects were transferred to the US National Museum.

The genera Bakeromyces and Bakerophoma were named in his honour. The beetle species Hesperopenna bakeri described from his collections was named after him.

The standard author abbreviation C.F.Baker is used to indicate this person as the author when citing a botanical name.
