= Samuel Mills Tracy =

American botanist (1847–1920)

Samuel Mills Tracy (1847–1920) was an American botanist.

== Biography ==
Samuel Tracy was born in 1847 in Hartford, Vermont. He lived in Illinois with his parents, and later moved to Wisconsin. When the Civil War broke out, he enlisted with the Union Army, serving a hundred days with a branch of the Wisconsin Volunteers. When he returned from his service, he started farming. In 1868 he received a Bachelor's degree, followed by a Master's three years later from Michigan State Agricultural College. Starting from 1871 to 1877 he worked in horticulture. Later in 1877 he was taken on at the University of Missouri as Professor of Botany. Ten years later, he became first Director of the Mississippi Experiment Station. Tracy is well known for his work in the taxonomy of various grasses, plant breeds, and for adapting numerous forage plants to the biomes of the Southern United States. He is perhaps best known for his work, Flora of Missouri, which was published in 1886.

== Selected works ==
The following list can be found at the Biodiversity Heritage Library:

- Tracy, S. M. (1886). "Catalogue of the phaenogamous and vascular cryptogamous plants of Missouri". Jefferson City, Missouri: Tribune Printing Co., State Printers and Binders.
- Nealley, G. C.; Pool, J.; Tracy, S. M.; Vasey, George (1888). "Report of an investigation of the grasses of the arid districts of Texas, New Mexico, Arizona, Nevada, and Utah, in 1887". Washington, D.C.: Government Printing Office.
- Bergen, Joseph Y.; Tracy, S. M. (1899). "Bergen's Elements of botany; key and flora. Southern United States edition". Boston, Massachusetts: Ginn & company.

Tracy edited the exsiccata-like series Plants of the Gulf States, collected and distributed by S. M. Tracy and was together with Charles Fuller Baker and Franklin Sumner Earle one of the editors of the exsiccata Plants of Southern Colorado.
