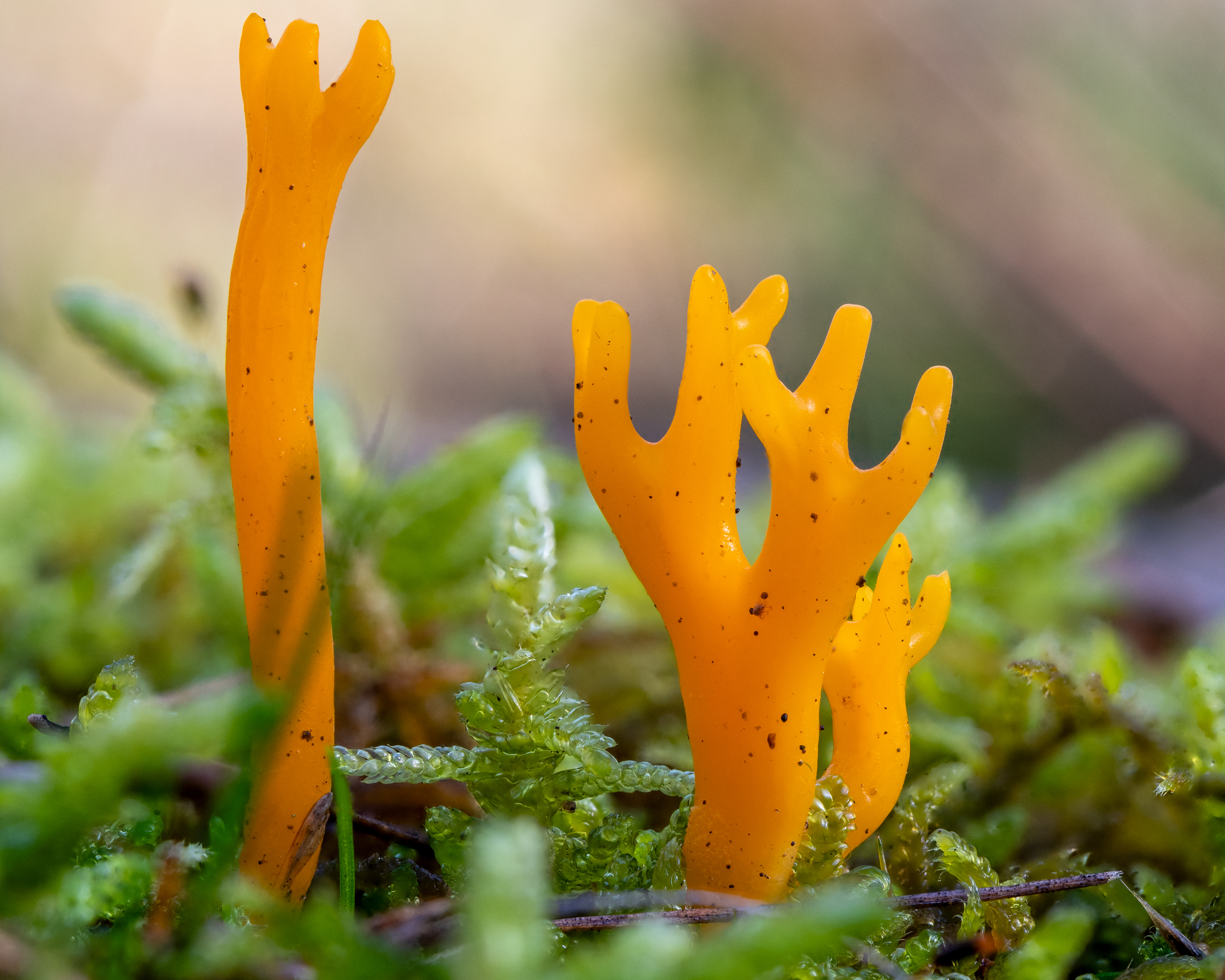
- Young fruit body of Calocera viscosa in Jockgrim, western Germany

Scientific classification
- Kingdom: Fungi
- Division: Basidiomycota
- Class: Dacrymycetes
- Order: Dacrymycetales
- Family: Dacrymycetaceae
- Genus: Calocera
- Species: C. viscosa

Binomial name
- Calocera viscosa (Pers.) Fr. (1827)

Synonyms
- Clavaria viscosa Pers. (1794); Clavaria aurea Humb. (1793) (nom. illegit.); Calocera flammea Wallr. (1833); Calocera cavarae Bres. (1896); Calocera viscosa var. cavarae (Bres.) McNabb (1965)

= Calocera viscosa =

Species of fungus

Calocera viscosa
- Mycological characteristics
- Smooth hymenium
- No distinct cap
- Hymenium attachment is irregular or not applicable
- Stipe is bare
- Spore print is white
- Ecology is saprotrophic

Calocera viscosa is a species of fungus in the family Dacrymycetaceae. In the United Kingdom, it has the recommended English name of yellow stagshorn. In North America it is variously called coral jelly fungus, jelly staghorn, yellow false coral, yellow tuning fork, and jelly antler.

The basidiocarps (fruit bodies) are small, gelatinous, bright golden yellow, and branched. Calocera viscosa grows on logs and dead wood of conifers. It is a common species throughout Europe and has also been recorded from North America, Asia, and Australia.

== Taxonomy ==
The species was originally described as Clavaria aurea by the German naturalist and explorer Alexander von Humboldt in 1793, but the name is illegitimate since it had already been used for a different species. The species was legitimately described as Clavaria viscosa from Germany in 1794 by South African-born mycologist Christiaan Hendrik Persoon. It was transferred to the genus Calocera by Swedish mycologist Elias Magnus Fries in 1827.

A white fungus from Italy was described as Calocera cavarae in 1896, but later studies suggested that this was only an aberrant form of C. viscosa lacking yellow pigments.

== Description ==
Calocera viscosa forms bright golden to orange-yellow (rarely white), firmly gelatinous fruit bodies up to 10 centimetres (4 in) tall, with a paler stem and coral-like branches.

The fruit bodies are too slight to be of culinary interest.

=== Microscopic characters ===
Hyphae lack clamp connections. The basidia are two-spored and typical of the Dacrymycetaceae. The spores are weakly allantoid (sausage-shaped), 8 to 12.5 by 3.5 to 4.5 μm, thin-walled, becoming tardily once-septate.

=== Similar species ===
Similar species include Calocera cornea and C. furcata, as well as Ramariopsis corcea and Clavulinopsis corniculata.

== Habitat and distribution ==
Calocera viscosa is a wood-decay fungus, found on logs and dead wood of conifers. It was originally described from Germany and is common throughout Europe, but has also been recorded from North America, Asia, and Australia. It appears from October to March on the West Coast of North America, and July to September elsewhere on the continent.
