= Franklin Sumner Earle =

American mycologist

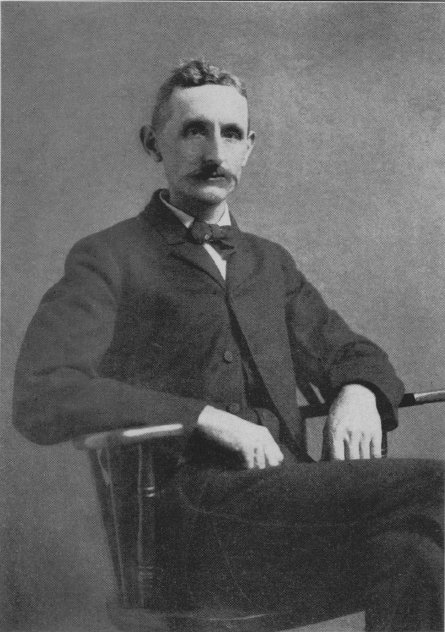
Earle circa 1903

Franklin Sumner Earle (September 4, 1856 – January 31, 1929) was an American mycologist who specialized in fungal plant diseases. He was the first ever mycologist to be employed at the New York Botanical Garden, and was the author of The Genera of North American Gill Fungi.

== Life ==
Franklin Sumner Earle was born in Dwight, Illinois, on September 4, 1856, to Parker Earle and Melanie Tracy. He spent much of his early youth at the Earle farm. Later he attended the University of Illinois at Urbana–Champaign sporadically in the 1880s, but never earned a degree. He studied with the mycologist Thomas Jonathan Burrill.

Soon after college, Earle served as the superintendent of the Mississippi Agriculture Experiment Station (1892–1895). Soon after that Earle worked as a biologist and horticulturist of the Alabama Agriculture Experiment Station (1895–1900).

Between 1890 and 1899 Earle was together with Arthur Bliss Seymour editor of the exsiccata works called Economic fungi.. With Charles Fuller Baker and Samuel Mills Tracy he distributed the exsiccata Plants of Southern Colorado. Together with his wife Esther Jane Skehan Earle he edited the exsiccata-like specimen series Plants of New Mexico (1900).

Earle worked as an Assistant Curator in charge of mycological collections at the New York Botanical Garden in 1901.

His sister was the fiction writer, Mary Tracy Earle.
