= Narcisse Théophile Patouillard =

French pharmacist and mycologist

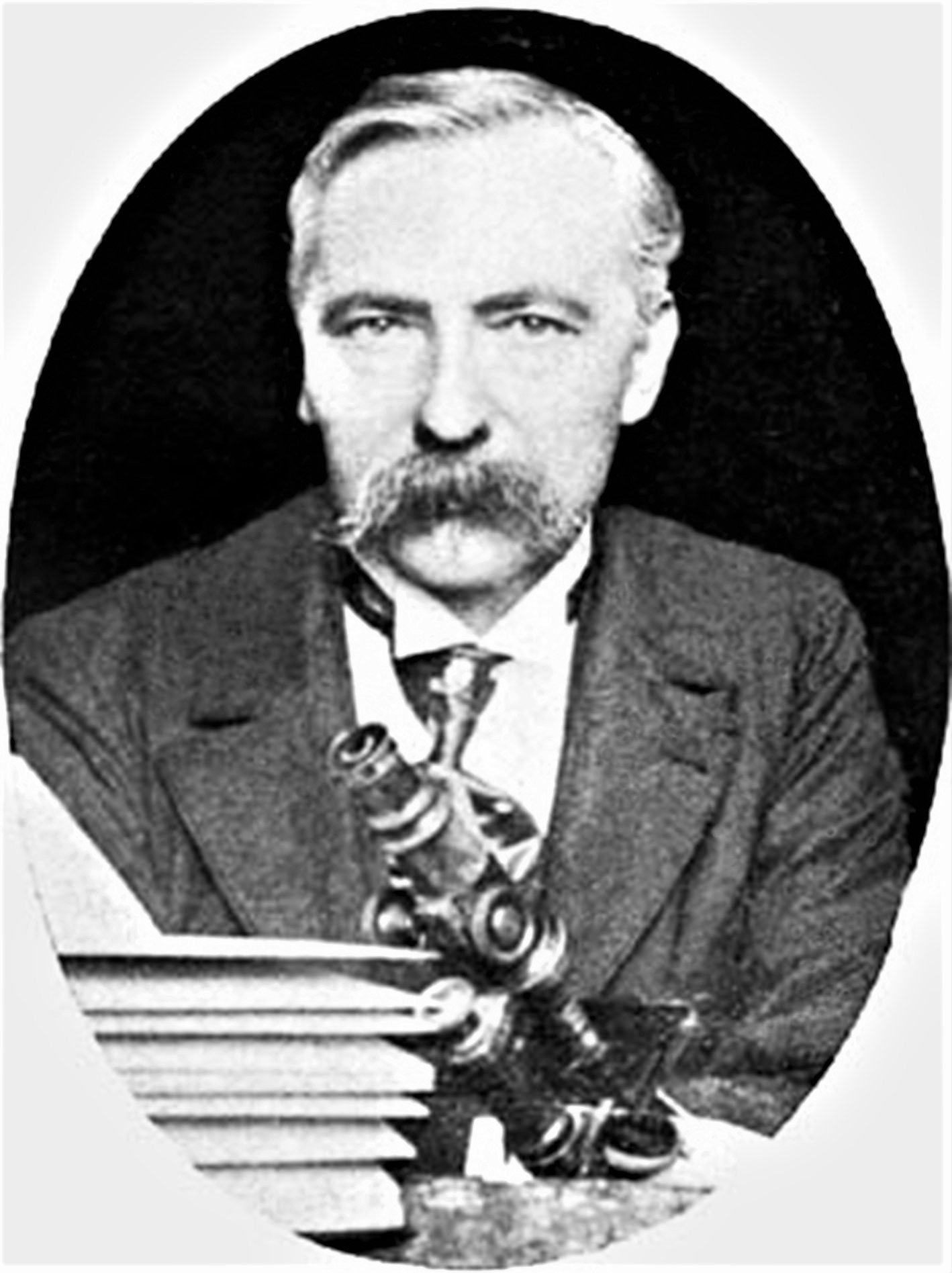
- Born: 2 July 1854
- Died: 30 March 1926 (aged 71)
- Scientific career
- Fields: Mycology
- Author abbrev. (botany): Pat.

Narcisse Théophile Patouillard (2 July 1854 – 30 March 1926) was a French pharmacist and mycologist.

He was born in Macornay, a town in the department of Jura. He studied in Besançon, then furthered his education at the École Supérieure de Pharmacie in Paris, where in 1884 he earned a diploma with a doctoral thesis involving the structure and classification of Hymenomycetes called "Des Hyménomycètes au point de vue de leur structure et de leur classification". With Jacques Emile Doassans he issued the exsiccata Champignons figurés et désechés (1880-1883).

Patouillard was a practicing pharmacist for more than forty years, first in Poligny (1881–84), and later in Fontenay-sous-Bois (1884–85), Paris (1886–1898) and Neuilly-sur-Seine (beginning in 1898). From 1893 to 1900, he was préparateur to the chair of cryptogamy at the École Supérieure de Pharmacie in Paris. In 1884 he was one of the founders of the Société mycologique de France and served as its third president in 1891–92. In 1920 he became an honorary member of the British Mycological Society. He died in Paris, aged 71.

Patouillard is highly regarded for his taxonomical work in mycology, and during his career, he described numerous genera and species of fungi. The following are some of the genera that he is the taxonomic authority of: Guepiniopsis, Hirsutella, Lacrymaria, Leucocoprinus, Melanoleuca and Spongipellis. A mycological species called Inocybe patouillardii (brick-red tear mushroom) is one of the species named after him.

He was the author of nearly 250 works, and was a leading authority on tropical mycology. Over 100 of his publications involved studies of fungi from diverse locales such as Brazil, Java, Guadeloupe, Mexico, New Caledonia, the Gambier Islands, Philippines, et al.

== Selected writings ==
- Tabulae analyticae Fungorum (Analytic tables of fungi), 1883–1889.
- Les Hyménomycètes d'Europe. Anatomie générale et classification des champignons supérieurs (The Hymenomycetes of Europe. General anatomy and classification of the higher fungi) 166 pp. 1887.
- Fragments mycologiques: Notes sur quelques champignons de la Martinique (Notes on certain mushrooms of Martinique) in Journal of Botany 3 pp. 335 - 343, 1889.
- Essai taxonomique sur les familles et les genres des Hyménomycètes (Taxonomic essay on the families and genera of Hymenomycetes), 1900.

== See also ==
- Category:Taxa named by Narcisse Théophile Patouillard
