= George Willard Martin =

American mycologist (1886–1971)

- Born: October 27, 1886; Brooklyn, New York
- Died: September 11, 1971 (aged 84)
- Education: Rutgers University; University of Chicago
- Scientific career
- Fields: Mycology
- Workplaces: University of Iowa
- Doctoral advisor: Thurlow Christian Nelson, Henry Chandler Cowles
- Author abbrev. (botany): G.W.Martin

George Willard Martin (October 27, 1886 – September 11, 1971) was an American mycologist. He was born in Brooklyn, New York. He received a bachelor of literature degree in 1912, and a Master of Science degree in 1915, both from Rutgers University. He received a PhD from the University of Chicago in 1922, under the direction of Thurlow Christian Nelson and Henry Chandler Cowles, and he published the results of his research in the Botanical Gazette in 1923 under the title "Food of the Oysters". Afterward, he began work at the University of Iowa, where he became a professor, and he was head of the Department of Botany from 1953 to 1955. He became an emeritus professor and was still an active researcher until after he turned 80. Martin was the associate editor for mycology for the journal The American Midland Naturalist.
