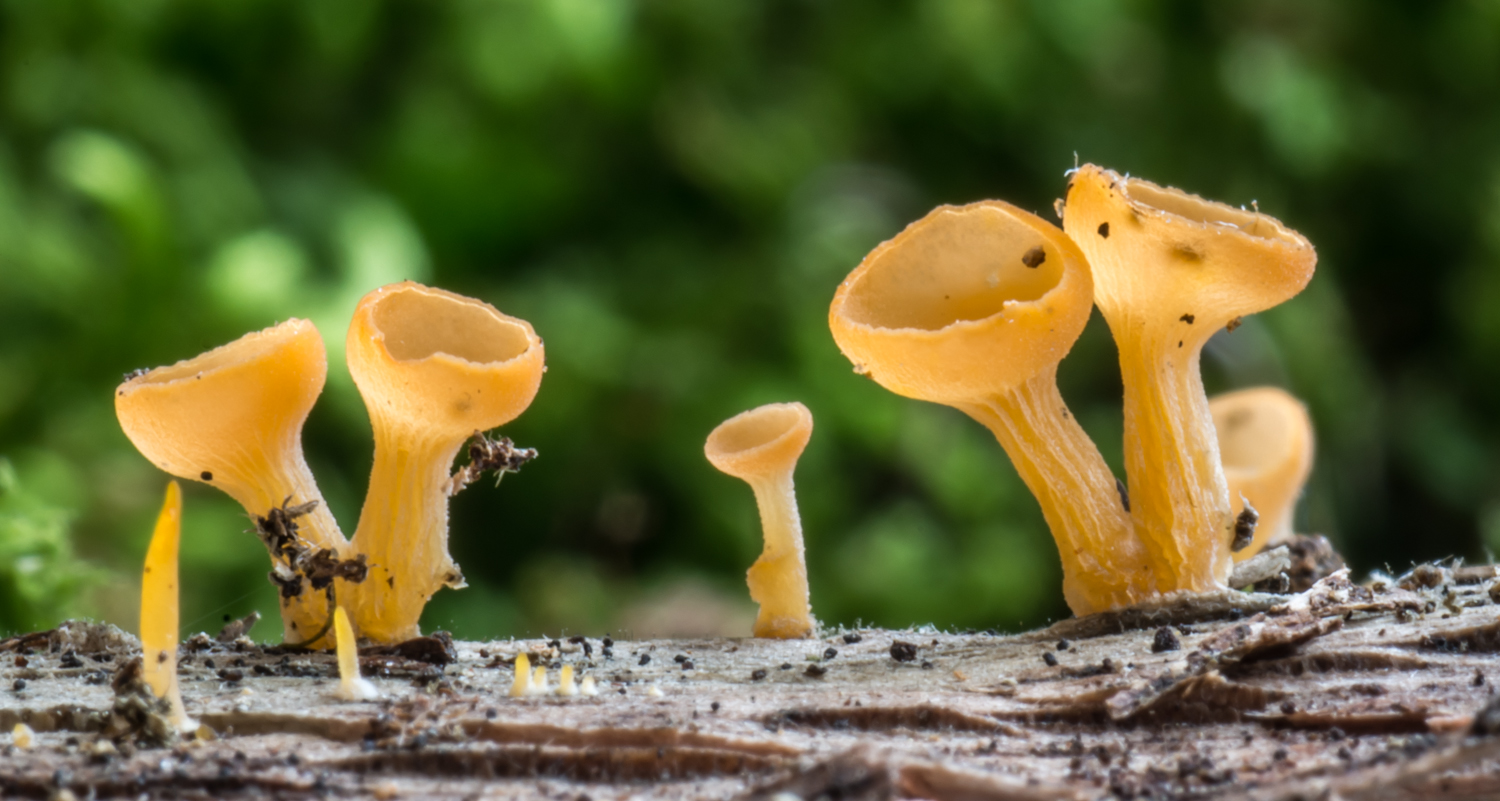
- Guepiniopsis buccina, New York

Scientific classification
- Kingdom: Fungi
- Division: Basidiomycota
- Class: Dacrymycetes
- Order: Dacrymycetales
- Family: Dacrymycetaceae; J. Schröt. 1888

Type genus
- Dacrymyces Nees (1816)

Genera
- Calocera; Cerinosterus; Dacryopinax; Dacryoscyphus; Dendrodacrys; Ditiola; Guepiniopsis; Femsjonia; Heterotextus

= Dacrymycetaceae =

Class of fungi

The Dacrymycetaceae are a family of fungi in the order Dacrymycetales. Species are saprotrophs and occur on dead wood. Their distribution is worldwide. Basidiocarps (fruit bodies) are ceraceous (waxy) to gelatinous, often yellow to orange, and variously clavarioid, disc-shaped, cushion-shaped, spathulate (spoon-shaped), or corticioid (effused).

Genera in the Dacrymycetaceae have traditionally been differentiated on basidiocarp morphology, in later years following the monographs of New Zealand mycologist Robert McNabb. Molecular research, based on cladistic analysis of DNA sequences, has however shown that morphology is not a good indicator of natural relationships. To date, only the recently described genus Dendrodacrys is monophyletic. The remaining genera await further research.
