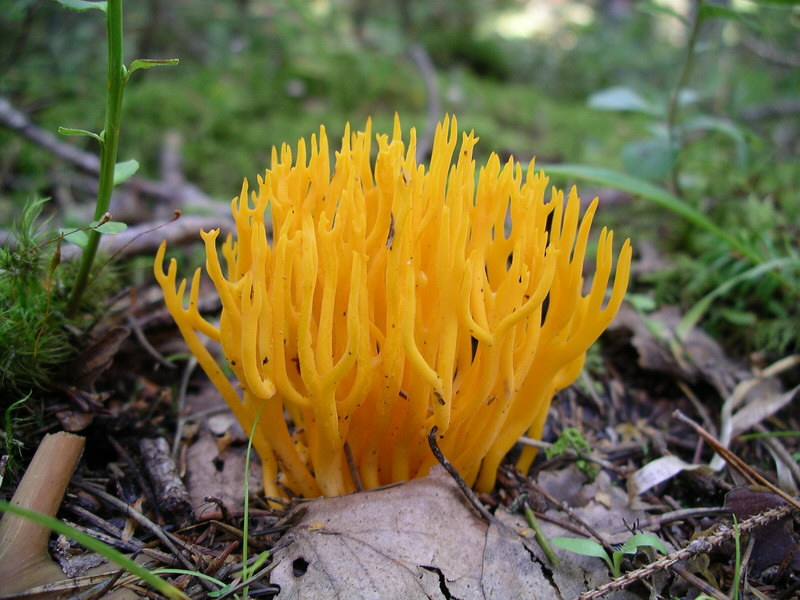
- Calocera viscosa on conifer wood

Scientific classification
- Kingdom: Fungi
- Division: Basidiomycota
- Subdivision: Agaricomycotina
- Class: Dacrymycetes; Doweld (2001)
- Order: Dacrymycetales; Henn. (1898)

Families
- Cerinomycetaceae; Dacrymycetaceae; Dacryonaemataceae; Unilacrymaceae

= Dacrymycetales =

Class of fungi

The Dacrymycetes are a class of fungi in the Basidiomycota. The class currently contains the single order Dacrymycetales, with a second proposed order Unilacrymales now treated at the family level. The order contains four families and has a cosmopolitan distribution.

All fungi in the Dacrymycetes are wood-rotting saprotrophs. Basidiocarps (fruit bodies) are ceraceous to gelatinous, typically yellow to orange as a result of carotenoid pigments, and variously corticioid (effused and patch-forming), disc- or cushion-shaped, spathulate, or clavarioid (club or coral-like). Microscopically, nearly all species have distinctive Y-shaped holobasidia.

Species were formerly placed in the Heterobasidiomycetes and are informally included in the "jelly fungi".
