= Stuffed bitter melon soup =

Vietnamese soup

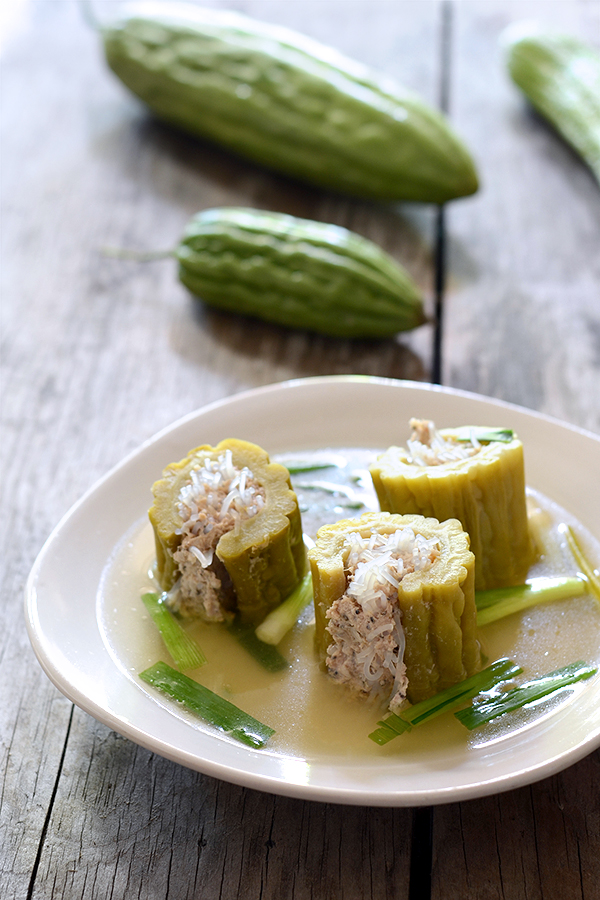
Soup made from stuffed bitter melon, from Vietnamese cuisine

Stuffed bitter melon soup or stuffed bitter gourd soup (canh khổ qua nhồi thịt) is a soup in Vietnamese cuisine which is popular in Asia. The New York Times also mentioned the dish as part of the Vietnamese Lunar New Year culture.

Its main ingredient is bitter melon with some different stuffed ingredients depending on who made it. The most used stuffed ingredient is pork.

== General information ==
Bitter melon has many names depending on the country that call them, for example, Gourd melon, ‘Mara’ in Thai, and ‘Leung Gwa’, which means ‘the cooling melon’ in Cantonese.

Bitter melon is in season in the summer while dried for off-season.

== Ingredients ==
The main ingredient is bitter melon stuffed with pork or fish. Condiments can include glass noodles or bean thread noodles, jelly ear, dried shrimp, shallot or green onion, sprigs of cilantro, egg-white, and soy sauce or fish sauce. The vegan version of bitter melon soup substitutes meat for sweetened seitan and scallions.
