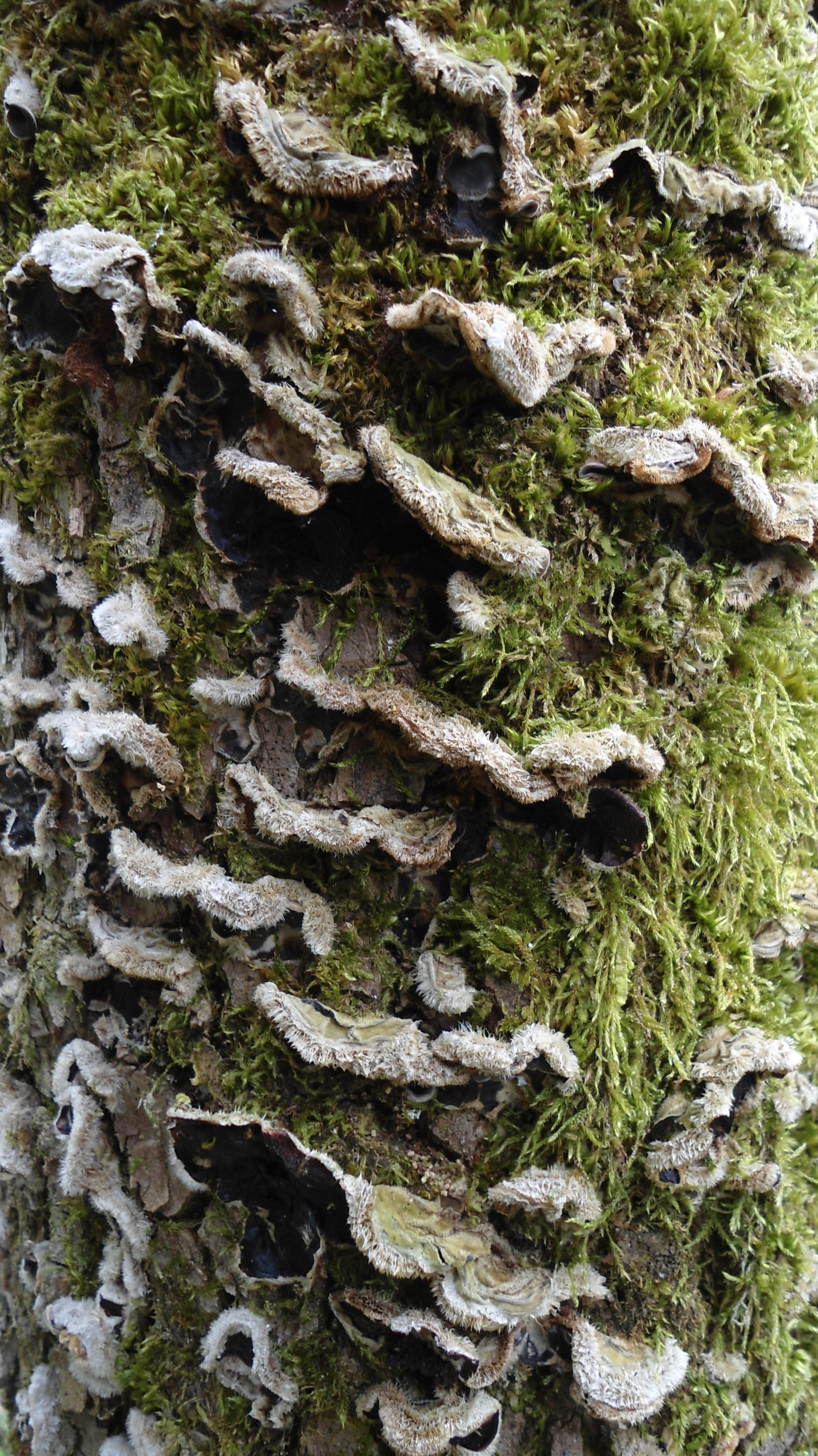

Scientific classification
- Domain: Eukaryota
- Kingdom: Fungi
- Division: Basidiomycota
- Class: Agaricomycetes
- Order: Auriculariales
- Family: Auriculariaceae
- Genus: Auricularia
- Species: A. mesenterica

Binomial name
- Auricularia mesenterica (Dicks.) Pers. 1822

Synonyms
- Species synonymy: Helvella mesenterica Dicks. (1785); Auricularia corrugata Sowerby (1800); Auricularia lobata Sommerf. (1826); Auricularia mesenterica var. lobata (Sommerf.) Rea (1922); Auricularia tremelloides Bull.(1787); Auricularia tremelloides var. fusca Bull. (1791); Auricularia tremelloides var. subcaerulea Bull. (1791); Auricularia tremelloides var. violacea Bull. (1791); Thelephora mesenterica Pers. (1801); Auricularia corrugata Sowerby (1800); Stereum mesentericum (Pers.) Gray (1821); Auricularia mesenteriformis Brongniart (1825)

= Auricularia mesenterica =

Species of fungus

Auricularia mesenterica, commonly known as the tripe fungus, is a species of fungus in the family Auriculariaceae. Basidiocarps (fruit bodies) are gelatinous and typically formed in coalescing tiers on stumps and logs. They are partly pileate, with hirsute, zoned caps, and partly resupinate, with smooth to wrinkled undersurfaces that spread over the wood. Auricularia mesenterica is a saprotroph on dead deciduous trees and shrubs. The species is restricted to Europe and Central Asia.

== Taxonomy and etymology ==
Auricularia mesenterica was described from England in 1785 by James Dickson as Helvella mesenterica and transferred to the genus Auricularia by Christiaan Hendrik Persoon in 1822. The species was considered to be cosmopolitan and was subsequently applied to collections from America, Asia, and Australia as well as Europe.

Molecular research, based on cladistic analysis of DNA sequences, has however shown that Auricularia mesenterica (as previously understood) is a complex of related species and that A. mesenterica sensu stricto is confined to Europe and Central Asia, with superficially similar but distinct species occurring elsewhere.

The specific epithet is a Latin adjective formed from the Ancient Greek word μεσεντέριον (mesentérion), "middle intestine", from μεσο- (meso-, "middle, center") and ἔντερον (énteron, "intestine"), referring to its shape.

== Description ==
This species forms bracket-like fruit bodies that first appear pale, rubbery, and button-like, expanding to typically 3 to 7 cm (1.2 to 2.8 in) across and hardening with age. The fruit bodies often merge into compound structures sometimes running along fallen trunks and branches for more than a metre (3.3 ft). The upper surface is grey to brown or buff, tomentose to hispid with concentric zones, while the underside is thickly gelatinous, irregularly folded radially and reddish brown. The spore print is white. Microscopically the basidia are auricularioid (tubular with three lateral septa) and the basidiospores are allantoid (sausage-shaped), 14 to 17 by 4.5 to 5 μm.

== Distribution and habitat ==
Originally described from England, the species is known to occur throughout Europe and into Central Asia as far as Uzbekistan. Basidiocarps are formed on various deciduous tree stumps and logs.

== Similar species ==
Other species in the Auricularia mesenterica complex include Auricularia brasiliensis in South America, A. pusio in Australia, A. africana in East Africa, and A. asiatica, A. orientalis, A. srilankensis, and A. submesenterica in Asia. Other species of Auricularia lack the zoned, hirsute upper surface found in the A. mesenterica complex. Some unrelated Stereum species may have similarly zoned caps, but their fruit bodies are leathery (not gelatinous) and their undersurfaces are often yellowish to orange.

== Uses ==
Before the fruit body fully matures and hardens, young specimens are said to be edible, but in some local populations, these fungi tend to bioaccumulate high levels of heavy metals from their environment. A. mesenterica has shown to have high levels of phenols, flavonoids, and antioxidant activity, having potential as antitumor agent.

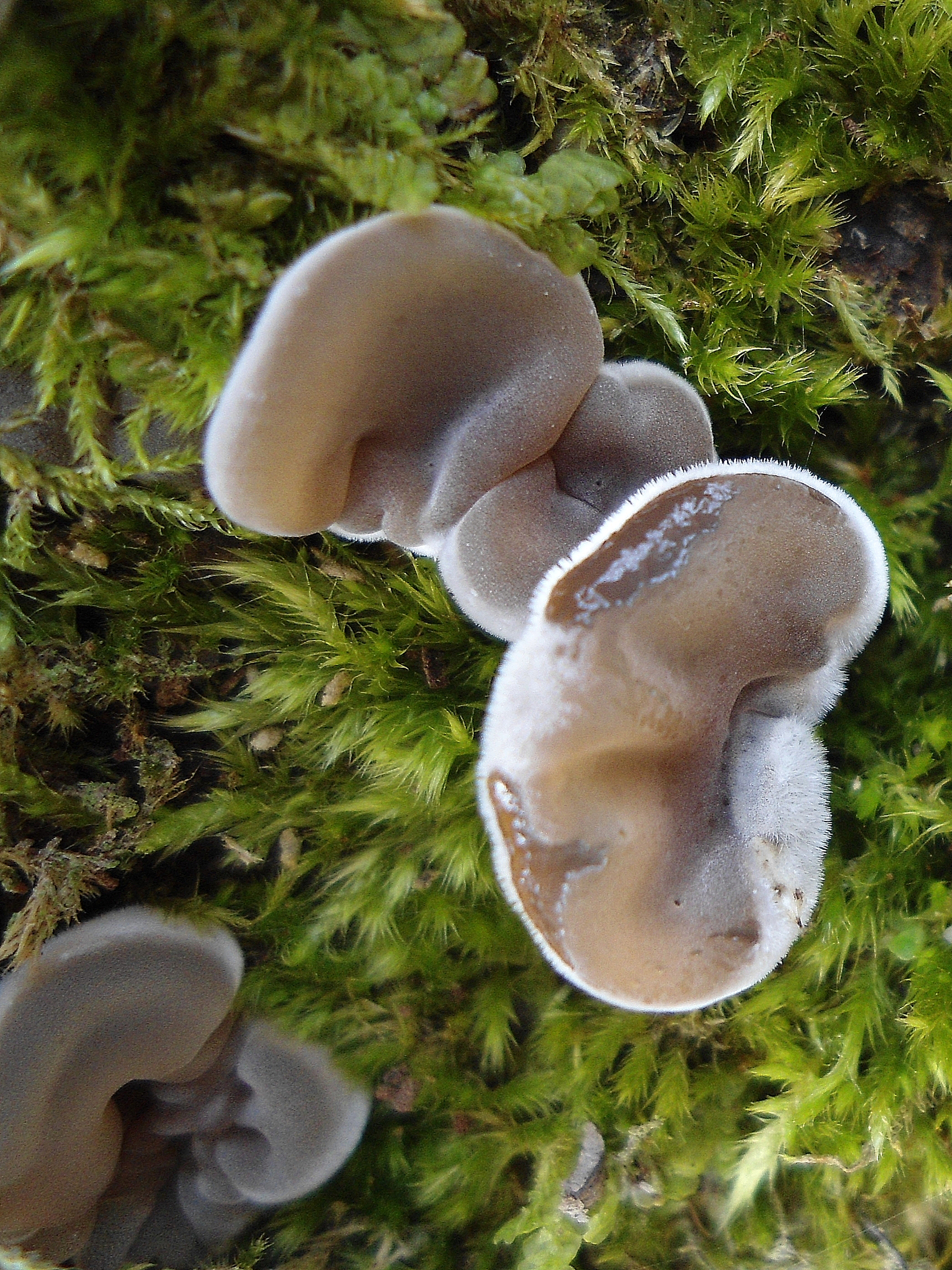
Young A. mesenterica

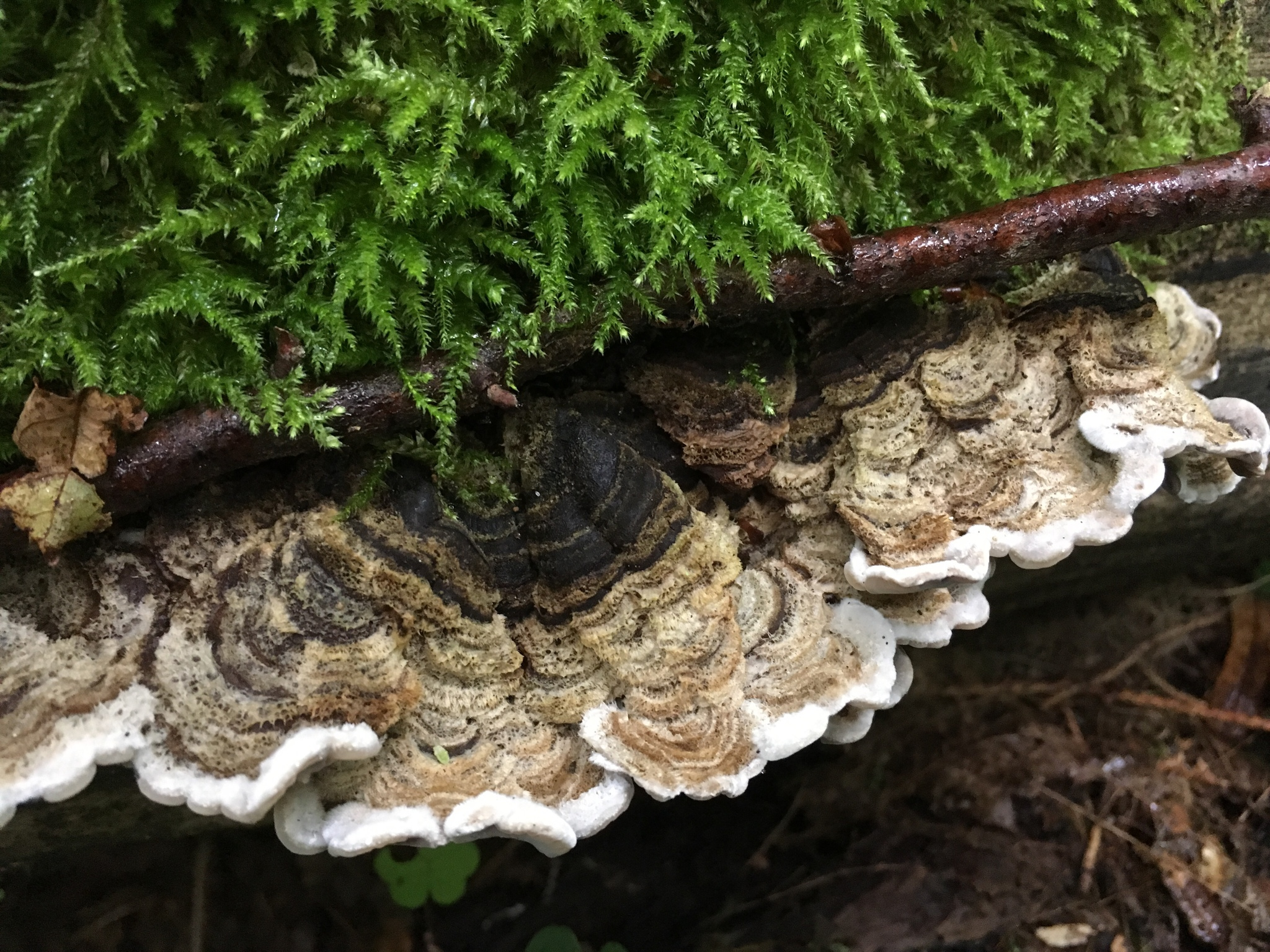
Mature A. mesenterica
