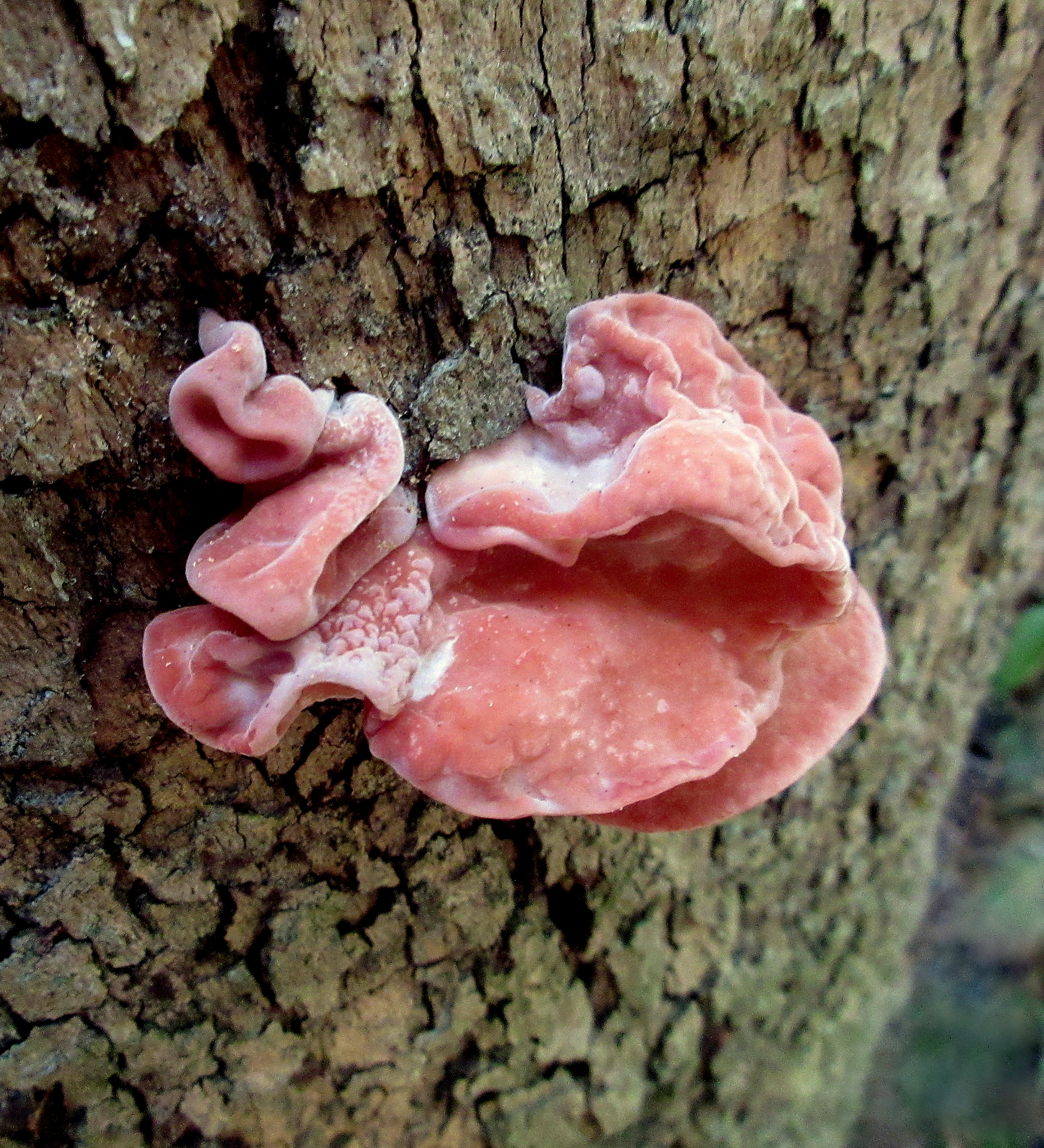
- Auricularia angiospermarum on dead broadleaf tree, Missouri

Scientific classification
- Domain: Eukaryota
- Kingdom: Fungi
- Division: Basidiomycota
- Class: Agaricomycetes
- Order: Auriculariales
- Family: Auriculariaceae
- Genus: Auricularia
- Species: A. angiospermarum

Binomial name
- Auricularia angiospermarum Y.C. Dai, F. Wu & D.W. Li (2015)

= Auricularia angiospermarum =

Species of fungus

Auricularia angiospermarum (wood ear or tree ear) is a species of fungus in the family Auriculariaceae. Basidiocarps (fruitbodies) are gelatinous, ear-like, and grow on dead wood of broadleaf trees. It is a North American species and was formerly confused with Auricularia auricula-judae which is confined to Europe.

== Taxonomy ==
The species was originally described in 2015 from Connecticut on a fallen oak trunk. It had previously been referred to Auricularia americana 'deciduous unit', but additional molecular research, based on cladistic analysis of DNA sequences, has shown that Auricularia angiospermarum is a distinct species.

== Description ==
Auricularia angiospermarum forms thin, brown, rubbery-gelatinous fruit bodies that are ear-shaped and up to 80 mm (3.1 in) across and 3 mm (0.12 in) thick. The fruitbodies occur singly or in clusters. The upper surface is finely pilose. The spore-bearing underside is smooth.

=== Microscopic characters ===
The microscopic characters are typical of the genus Auricularia. The basidia are tubular, laterally septate, 45–65 × 3.5–5 μm. The spores are allantoid (sausage-shaped), 13–15 × 5–5.5 μm.

=== Similar species ===
In North America, Auricularia americana is almost identical but grows on conifer wood. On wood of broadleaf trees, Auricularia fuscosuccinea occurs in southern North America and typically has cinnamon-brown to purplish-brown fruitbodies. Auricularia nigricans is also southern, but has a densely pilose upper surface.

== Habitat and distribution ==
Auricularia angiospermarum is a wood-rotting species, typically found on dead attached or fallen wood of broadleaf trees. It is widely distributed in North America, but is not currently known elsewhere.
