= Shinkan Co., Ltd. =

Japanese company based in Kobe, Japan

- Type: Private
- Industry: Food trading
- Founded: Kobe, Japan 1970
- Headquarters: Kobe, Japan
- Key people: Nobu-hiro Isagawa (President and CEO)
- Website: http://www.shinkan.jp

Shinkan Co., Ltd. (株式会社 神乾) is a Japanese company based in Kobe, Japan. Established in 1970, the company's line of business includes the wholesale distribution of groceries and related products. Shinkan is a member of JETRO.

== Products ==
- A variety of authentic Japanese dry, chilled and frozen foods (including JFDA brand products)
- Agricultural products (Shiitake mushroom, black fungus, dried radish, etc.)
