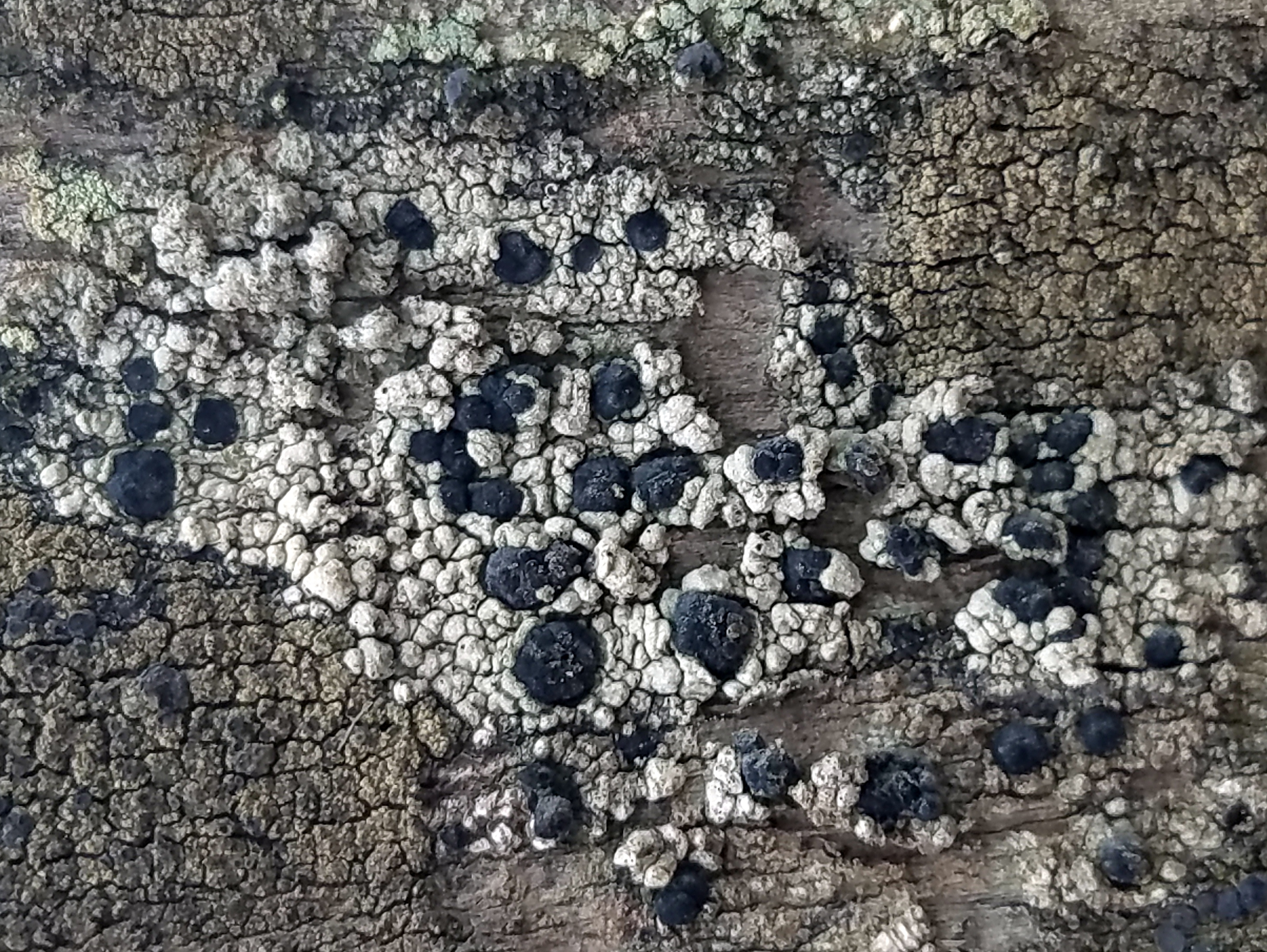

Conservation status
- Apparently Secure (NatureServe)

Scientific classification
- Kingdom: Fungi
- Division: Ascomycota
- Class: Lecanoromycetes
- Order: Caliciales
- Family: Caliciaceae
- Genus: Buellia
- Species: B. oidalea

Binomial name
- Buellia oidalea (Tuck.) Tuck.

= Buellia oidalea =

Species of crustose lichen

Buellia oidalea is a species of crustose lichen found along the Pacific coast of North America, from Coos County, Oregon to Baja California Sur.

== Morphology ==
The thallus of Buellia oidalea is crustose, varying from thin and rimose-areolate to thick and rugose-verrucose or even subsquamulose. The prothallus is often present, appearing black. The thallus surface is yellowish white to glaucous gray, smooth, and esorediate. The medulla is white and lacks calcium oxalate.

The apothecia of B. oidalea are lecideine and commonly found, ranging from 0.2 to 2 mm in diameter, and are sessile in nature. Initially, the disc is black, devoid of pruina, and flat, but as it matures, it becomes convex. The margin starts as distinct but eventually becomes excluded and black. The proper exciple measures between 35 and 95 μm in thickness, lacking secondary metabolites, and appears uniformly dark brown throughout, with carbonized cells smaller than 6 μm. It is transient and accompanied by a brown hypothecium, which is less than 280 μm thick. The epihymenium shares a continuous brown pigmentation with the outer exciple. The hymenium is hyaline, generously interspersed with oil droplets, and measures 115 to 165 μm in height. The tips of the paraphyses typically measure less than 3 μm in width and are adorned with distinct apical caps. Asci are clavate, of Bacidia-type, measuring 95 to 112 x 20 to 40 μm, and typically contain 8 spores.

The ascospores of B. oidalea typically exhibit a hyaline to ±olive coloration, eventually transitioning to brown, while often retaining unpigmented apices. They possess a muriform structure, comprising 13–40 cells in optical section, and are ellipsoid to oblong in shape, measuring (29.5-)33.7-[39.6]-45.5(-57) x (12.5-)13.3-[15.5]-17.7(-26.5) μm. The ascospores feature apical, lateral, and septal wall thickenings, with the apical thickenings often being permanent. Their proper wall is approximately 1.2 μm thick, and they lack a perispore, with no discernible ornamentation visible under DIC.

Pycnidia are rare, immersed with only the uppermost part protruding, and the wall is mainly pigmented in the upper part. The conidia are bacilliform, 4-6 x 1 μm.

== Chemistry ==
Spot tests show the thallus is K-, C+ orange (best seen under the microscope), P-. The medulla is K-, C-, P-. The lichen exhibits UV+ bright or pale yellow to orange fluorescence, and the medulla is nonamyloid in iodine reaction.

The secondary chemistry includes diploicin (major), isofulgidin (minor), an unknown (minor) compound, and 2,5-dichloro-3-O-methylnorlichexanthone (trace).

== Ecology and distribution ==
Buellia oidalea thrives on the bark and wood surfaces of trunks, branches, and twigs found on both broad-leaved and coniferous trees and shrubs. Its habitat encompasses various open environments along the Pacific coast, including dune areas, salt marshes, chaparral, and coastal deserts.

This species is predominantly found along the Pacific coast and islands of North America, spanning from Coos County, Oregon to Baja California Sur. Notably, within the Sonoran region, it has been documented in the coastal fog zones of southern California, Baja California, and Baja California Sur.

== Distinguishing features ==
Buellia oidalea is distinguished by its prominent muriform ascospores. While resembling Buellia oidaliella, it sets itself apart with notably larger spores featuring thickened, frequently unpigmented apices, along with a taller hymenium, and the lack of calcium oxalate.
