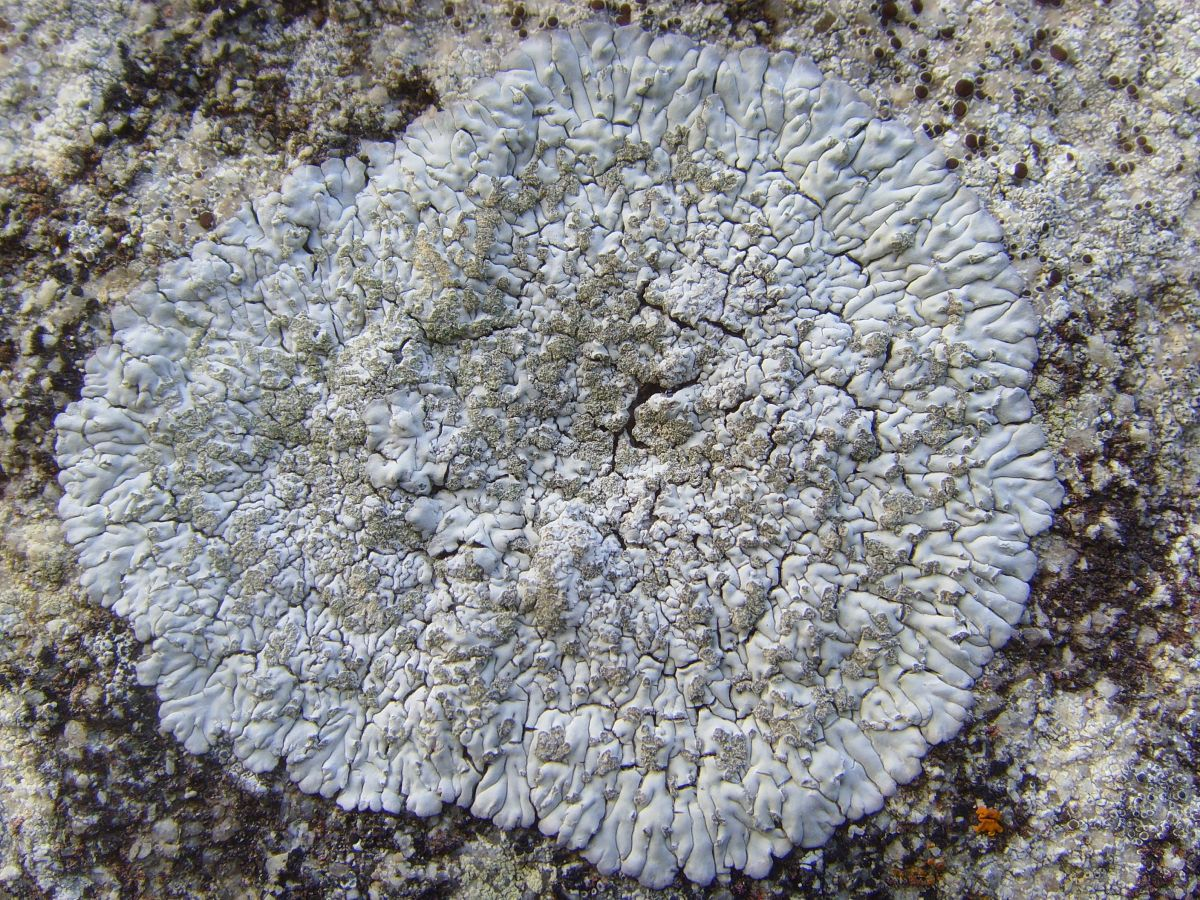

Scientific classification
- Kingdom: Fungi
- Division: Ascomycota
- Class: Lecanoromycetes
- Order: Caliciales
- Family: Caliciaceae
- Genus: Diploicia
- Species: D. canescens

Binomial name
- Diploicia canescens (Dicks.) A.Massal. (1852)

Synonyms
- List: Lichen canescens Dicks. (1785); Psora canescens (Dicks.) Hoffm. (1796); Lecidea canescens (Dicks.) Ach. (1803); Placodium canescens (Dicks.) DC. (1805); Lepidoma canescens (Dicks.) Gray (1821); Patellaria canescens (Dicks.) Wallr. (1831); Buellia canescens (Dicks.) De Not. (1846); Diplotomma canescens (Dicks.) Flot. (1849); Catolechia canescens (Dicks.) Anzi (1862)

= Diploicia canescens =

Species of lichenized fungus

Diploicia canescens is a widespread species of lichen-forming fungus in the family Caliciaceae. It is found throughout much of the world, occurring on every continent except Antarctica. It is a crustose lichen with distinctive lobed margins that grows in rosettes up to 6 cm (2.4 in) across, appearing white to pale gray with white-pruinose marginal lobes. The species contains various biologically active compounds including depsidones, depsides, and phthalides. It typically grows on rocks, old walls, and tree trunks, particularly favoring nutrient-enriched areas such as birds' perching stones, though it is sensitive to sulfur dioxide pollution. Two subspecies are recognized: D. c. canescens and D. c. australasica, which differ in their chemical composition.

== Taxonomy ==
Diploicia canescens was first described by James Dickson in 1785 as Lichen canescens. It was later assigned to a host of genera before being moved to its current genus, Diploicia, by Abramo Bartolommeo Massalongo in 1852. It is the type species for the genus. Some mycologists assign this species (and all other members of the genus Diploicia) to the genus Diplotomma, but genetic analysis suggests that this would make Diplotomma a polyphyletic group, and that the Diploicia species are more appropriately assigned to a separate genus. There are two subspecies, D. c. canescens and D. c. australasica, which differ in the chemistry of their thallus. D. c. canescens contains canesolide and buellolide, while D. c. australasica does not.

The genus name Diploicia derives from the Greek word diploos, meaning "two-fold" – a reference to its two-celled ascospores. The specific name canescens is Latin for "gray-haired" or "white with old age".

== Description ==
Diploicia canescens is a crustose lichen with lobed margins, a growth type known as "placodioid". It grows in rosettes up to 6 cm (2.4 in) across. The thallus, which can range in color from white to very pale gray, is typically darker in the center and very white-pruinose on the marginal lobes. These lobes are convex, becoming wider at the tips – up to 1 mm (0.04 in) wide. The center of the thallus is generally covered with soralia, which are flour-like and pale to slightly yellow in color. The photobiont of D. canescens is a green algae (chlorococcoid).

Like many lichens, D. canescens disperses primarily by means of symbiotic vegetative propagules; most are covered with extensive mats of soralia. Apothecia are rare, but where they occur are black, lecideine (meaning that they have no thalline margin), and measure 0.3–1 mm in diameter. Each ascus contains eight spores. Each spore is brown with a cell wall (called a septum) that divides it into two cells; it measures 10–15 μm x 5–8 μm. Observations in Ireland found apothecia only between the months of August and December. The production of spores increased over that time period, with peak germination occurring in October and November.

== Habitat and distribution ==
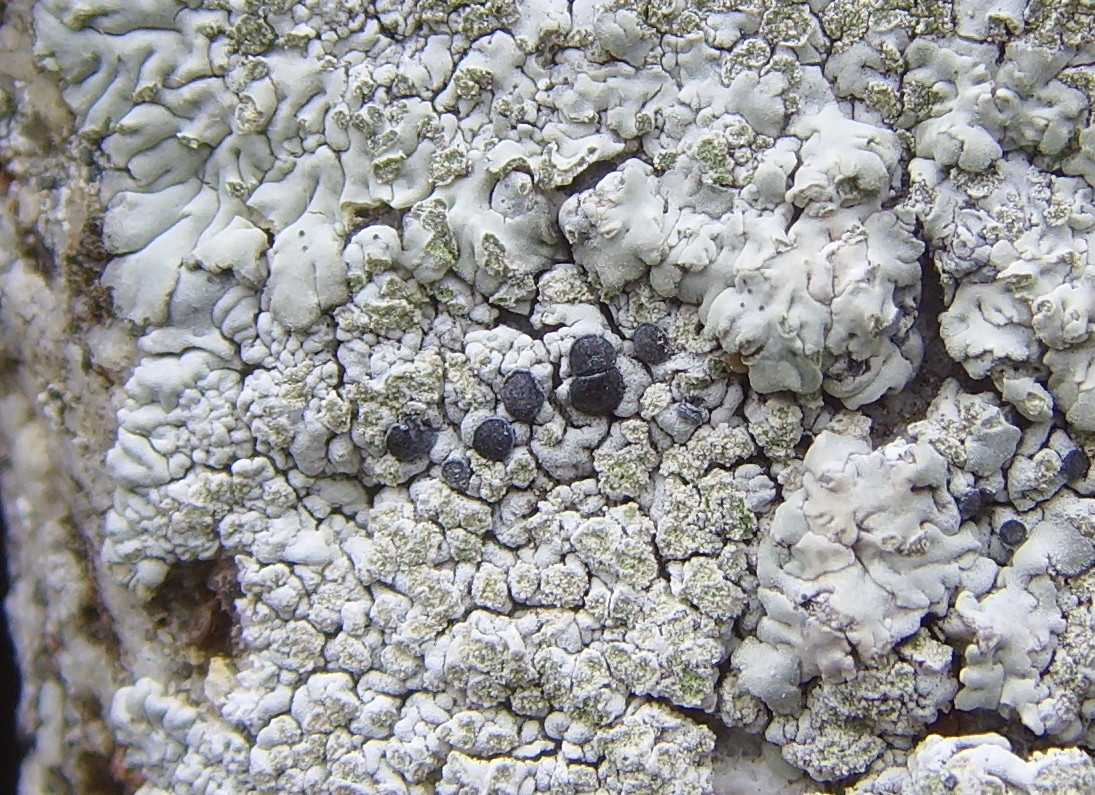
Close-up, showing apothecia and soralia

Diploicia canescens has been found on every continent but Antarctica, though it is less common on some continents than others. It was only added to the North American list in 1984; previous records actually referred to a different species.

Unlike some lichens, D. canescens occurs in abundance on both calcareous and siliceous substrates. It occurs on rocks, old walls, and tree trunks, favoring nutrient-enriched areas, such as birds' perching stones. In Nepal, Diploicia canescens has been reported at 4,650 m elevation in a compilation of published records; this reported range lies above the tree line used in the study.

== Ecology ==
Diploicia canescens contains various chemical compounds including depsidones (such as diploicin and scensidin), depsides (atranorin and chloroatranorin), phthalides (buellolide and canesolide), dechlorodiploicin, isofulgidin, and minor or trace amounts of dechloro-O-methyldiploicin and secalonic acids A, B, C. Derivatives of diploicin have been shown, in vitro, to be active against bacterial species including Mycobacterium smegmatis, Corynebacterium diphtheriae (mitis), and M. tuberculosis.

The overall status of D. canescens has not been evaluated by the International Union for Conservation of Nature. It is impacted by the presence of sulfur dioxide, and is slow to recolonize areas where such pollution has declined.

Diploicia canescens is attacked by lichenicolous fungi, including Arthonia diploiciae. As it often grows in nutrient-enriched areas, it is sometimes overgrown by alien green algae (green algae not incorporated into the lichen itself).
