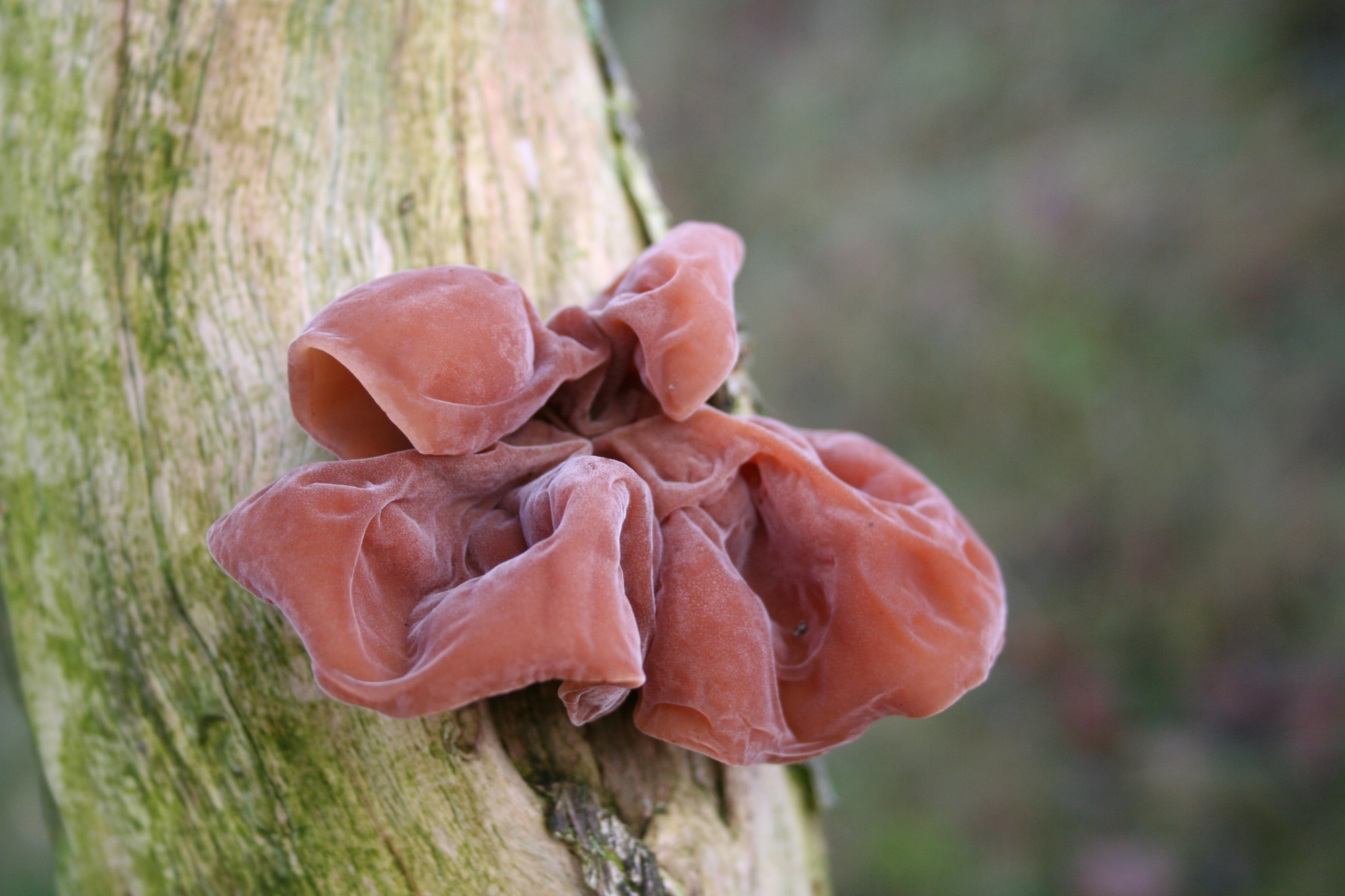
- Auricularia auricula-judae

Scientific classification
- Kingdom: Fungi
- Division: Basidiomycota
- Class: Agaricomycetes
- Order: Auriculariales
- Family: Auriculariaceae
- Genus: Auricularia; Bull. (1780)

Type species
- Auricularia mesenterica (Dicks.) Pers. (1822)

Species
- over 30

Synonyms
- Patila Adans. (1763); Conchites Paulet (1791); Agarico-gelicidium Paulet (1793); Zonaria Roussel (1806); Laschia Fr. (1830); Oncomyces Klotzsch (1843); Hirneola Fr. (1848); Laschia subgen. Auriculariella Sacc. (1888); Seismosarca Cooke (1889); Auricula Battarra ex Kuntze (1891); Auriculariella Clem. (1909)

= Auricularia =

Genus of fungi

Auricularia is a genus of fungi in the family Auriculariaceae. Basidiocarps (fruit bodies) are typically gelatinous and ear-shaped, with a slightly downy to conspicuously hirsute upper surface and an under surface that is smooth, wrinkled or veined. All species grow on wood. Several Auricularia species are edible and commercially cultivated on a large scale in China and East Asia.

== Taxonomy ==
The genus was first introduced in 1780 by French mycologist Pierre Bulliard for a range of different fungi producing fruit bodies with an ear-like shape. In 1822 Christian Hendrik Persoon restricted the genus to two gelatinous species, Auricularia mesenterica (which became the type species) and A. sambuci (a synonym of Auricularia auricula-judae). In 1848 Swedish mycologist Elias Magnus Fries accepted A. mesenterica within the genus but, on the basis of differences in fruitbody appearance, introduced a new genus, Hirneola, for most other species. This division into two genera was maintained by some authors until at least the 1960s, though American mycologist Bernard Lowy's monograph of the genus had accepted Hirneola as a synonym of Auricularia in 1952 .

Molecular research, based on cladistic analysis of DNA sequences, has shown that Auricularia (including Hirneola) forms a natural, monophyletic grouping. It has also shown that many species are more restricted in distribution than previously thought, resulting in the description of additional new taxa.

== Description ==
All species of Auricularia form thin, brownish, rubbery-gelatinous fruit bodies that are shelf-like or ear-shaped and up to 120 mm (4.7 in) across and 5 mm (0.20 in) thick. The fruitbodies occur singly or in clusters. The upper surface is finely pilose to densely hirsute. The spore-bearing underside is smooth, wrinkled, veined, or reticulate (net-like). Unpigmented white forms are occasionally encountered.

=== Microscopic characters ===
The spore-producing basidia are tubular, laterally septate, and (in some species) up to 100 μm long. The spores are allantoid (sausage-shaped), and (in some species) up to 22 μm long. Hairs on the upper surface are thick-walled, rounded or acute at the tip, and (in some species) up to 1 cm (0.39 in) long. When sectioned, some species show a central, medulla layer of parallel hyphae, others lack such a layer.

== Habitat, ecology and distribution ==
All species grow on wood and are saprotrophic wood-rotters, producing a white rot. Most occur on dead wood, but they can also be weakly parasitic on living wood. The majority of species grow on broadleaf trees and shrubs, but a few grow on conifers. Fruit bodies occur singly, in clusters, or in tiers.

The genus has a global distribution, with some species confined to the tropics, others to north temperate regions, and others to south temperate regions.

== Uses ==
At least three species are commercially cultivated for food on a large scale in China and East Asia. They include Auricularia heimuer (black wood ear or cloud ear), formerly misdetermined as Auricularia auricula-judae; Auricularia cornea (hairy wood ear), formerly denoted as A. polytricha; and Auricularia villosula.

Other species are eaten locally around the world. A study on the use of fungi by the Bini people of southern Nigeria found that the local inhabitants collected and ate a species similar to A. auricula-judae, but that it was not one of the fungi they used medicinally. Collection of Auricularia species has also been documented in Nepal. However, the Nepalese do not consider them all that good for eating; of the three grades given to edible fungi, they were given the worst. Additional places where Auricularia species have been recorded as locally gathered and consumed include Benin, Chile, Fiji, Ghana, Guatemala, India, Indonesia, Madagascar, Mexico, Mozambique, and Poland.

Several species, including the Asian cultivated species and the European A. auricula-judae (jelly ear or jew's ear), have been used in traditional medicine. They have also been investigated for potential pharmaceutical use.

== Species ==
Image	Name	Type Location	Distribution
	Auricularia africana Y.C. Dai & F. Wu (2021)	Uganda	East Africa
	Auricularia albida (Romell) Rick (1958)	Paraguay	Paraguay
	Auricularia americana Parmasto & I. Parmasto ex Audet, Boulet & Sirard (2003)	Canada	North America, China, Russian Far East
	Auricularia angiospermarum Y.C. Dai, F. Wu & D.W. Li (2015)	United States	North America
	Auricularia asiatica Bandara & K.D. Hyde (2016)	Thailand	China, Thailand, Indonesia
	Auricularia auricula-judae (Bull.) Quél. (1886)	France	Europe
	Auricularia australiana Y.C. Dai & F. Wu (2021)	Australia	Australia
	Auricularia brasiliana Y.C. Dai & F. Wu (2015)	Brazil	Brazil
	Auricularia camposii Y.C. Dai & F. Wu (2021)	Brazil	Brazil
	Auricularia cerrina Kout & Wu 2022	Czech Republic	Czech Republic
	Auricularia conferta Y.C. Dai & F. Wu (2021)	Australia	Australia
	Auricularia cornea Ehrenb. (1820)	Hawaii	Africa, South Asia, North America (Mexico), South America, South Pacific Islands, Australia, New Zealand
	Auricularia delicata (Mont. ex Fr.) Henn. (1893)	Guinea	West Africa
	Auricularia discensa Lloyd (1919)	Brazil	Brazil
	Auricularia eburnea L.J. Li & B. Liu (1985)	China	China
	Auricularia eminii Henn. (1893)	Congo	Africa
	Auricularia eximia (Berk. & Cooke) Kobayasi (1981)	Brazil	Brazil
	Auricularia fibrillifera Kobayasi (1973)	Papua New Guinea	New Guinea, China, Africa
	Auricularia fuscosuccinea (Mont.) Henn. (1893)	Cuba	North America (Mexico, Florida), South America, Caribbean
	Auricularia goossensiae Beeli (1926)	Congo	Congo
	Auricularia hainanensis L.J. Li (1987)	China	China
	Auricularia heimuer F. Wu, B.K. Cui & Y.C. Dai (2014)	China	China, Russian Far East, Japan (Aomori, Iwate, Niigata), Korea
	Auricularia hispida Iwade (1944)	Japan	Japan
	Auricularia incrassata Kobayasi (1973)	Papua New Guinea	Papua New Guinea
	Auricularia indica Massee (1914)	Singapore	Singapore
	Auricularia lateralis Y.C. Dai & F. Wu (2021)	China	China
	Auricularia mesenterica (Dicks.) Pers. (1822)	England	Europe, Uzbekistan
	Auricularia minor Kobayasi (1981)	Taiwan	Taiwan
	Auricularia minutissima Y.C. Dai, F. Wu & Malysheva (2015)	China	China, Russian Far East, Japan (Chiba, Kanagawa, Tokyo, Tottori)
	Auricularia nigricans (Sw.) Birkebak, Looney & Sánchez-García (2013)	Cuba	North America (Mexico, Florida), Central and South America, Caribbean, southern and eastern Asia
	Auricularia novozealandica Y.C. Dai & F. Wu (2021)	New Zealand	New Zealand
	Auricularia olivaceus B. Kumari, R.C. Upadhyay & Atri (2013)	India	India
	Auricularia orientalis Y.C. Dai & F. Wu (2015)	China	China
	Auricularia papyracea Yasuda (1918)	Japan	Japan
	Auricularia peltata Lloyd (1922)	Philippines	Philippines
	Auricularia pilosa Y.C. Dai, L.W. Zhou & F. Wu (2021)	Ethiopia	East Africa
	Auricularia rosea Burt (1921)	Costa Rica	Costa Rica
	Auricularia scissa Looney, Birkebak & Matheny (2013)	Dominican Republic	North America (Mexico, Florida), Caribbean
	Auricularia semipellucida Kobayasi (1942)	Taiwan	Taiwan
	Auricularia sinodelicata Y.C. Dai & F. Wu (2021)	China	China
	Auricularia sordescens Ces. (1879)	Malaysia	Malaysia
	Auricularia srilankensis Y.C. Dai & F. Wu (2021)	Sri Lanka	Sri Lanka
	Auricularia stellata Lloyd (1922)	Malaysia	Malaysia
	Auricularia subglabra Looney, Birkebak & Matheny (2013)	Costa Rica	Central and South America
	Auricularia submesenterica Y.C. Dai & F. Wu (2021)	China	China
	Auricularia tenuis (Lév.) Farl. (1905)	Indonesia	Indonesia
	Auricularia thailandica Bandara & K.D. Hyde (2015)	Thailand	China, Thailand, Japan (Okinawa)
	Auricularia tibetica Y.C. Dai & F. Wu (2015)	Tibet	China, Tibet
	Auricularia villosula Malysheva (2014)	Russian Far East	China, Russian Far East, Japan (Chiba, Kanagawa, Tokyo, Hyogo)
	Auricularia wrightii (Berk. & M.A. Curtis) Farl. (1905)	Cuba	Cuba
	Auricularia xishaensis L.J. Li 1985	China	China
