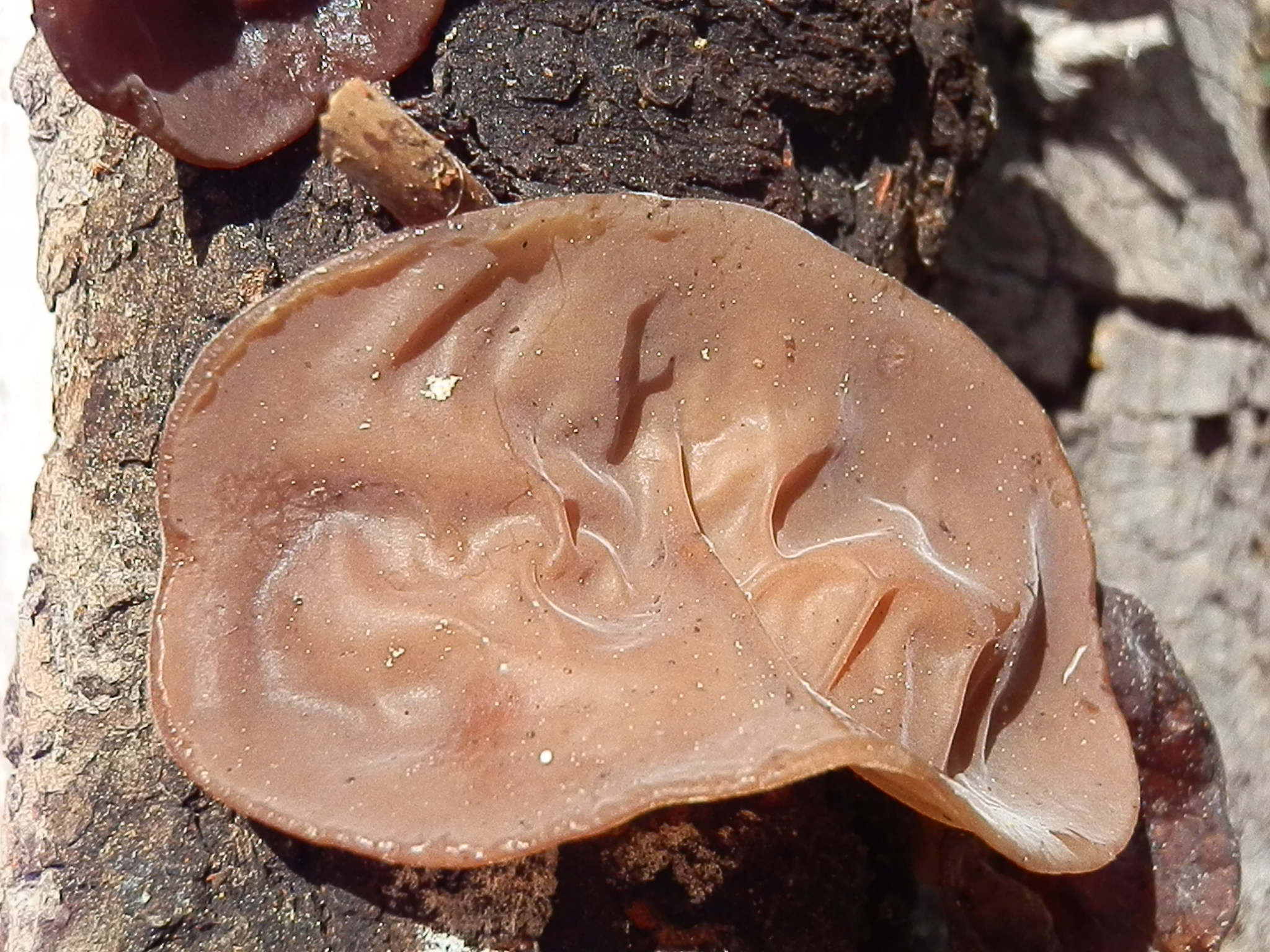
- Auricularia americana on dead conifer wood, Arizona

Scientific classification
- Kingdom: Fungi
- Division: Basidiomycota
- Class: Agaricomycetes
- Order: Auriculariales
- Family: Auriculariaceae
- Genus: Auricularia
- Species: A. americana

Binomial name
- Auricularia americana Parm. & I.Parm. ex Audet, Boulet & Sirard (2003)

= Auricularia americana =

Species of fungus

Auricularia americana is a species of fungus in the family Auriculariaceae found in North America and East Asia. Its basidiocarps (fruitbodies) are gelatinous, ear-like, and grow on dead conifer wood. They often appear on hardwoods or conifers after rain or wet conditions. And their fruiting temperature is around 59°F-72°F.

== Taxonomy ==
The species was originally described in 1987 from Quebec on Abies balsamea, but was not validly published until 2003. Molecular research, based on cladistic analysis of DNA sequences, has shown that Auricularia americana is a distinct species.

The species was formerly confused with Auricularia auricula-judae, which grows on broadleaf wood and is confined to Europe.

== Description ==
Auricularia americana forms thin, brown, rubbery-gelatinous fruit bodies that are ear-shaped and 2.5–10 centimetres (1–4 inches) across and about 3 millimetres (1/8 in) thick. The fruitbodies occur singly or in clusters. The upper surface is finely pilose. The spore-bearing underside is smooth. The spore print is white.

=== Microscopic characters ===
The microscopic characters are typical of the genus Auricularia. The basidia are tubular, laterally septate, 55–75 × 4–5 μm. The spores are allantoid (sausage-shaped), 12–16.5 × 4–5.5 μm.

=== Similar species ===
In North America, Auricularia angiospermarum is almost identical but grows on the wood of broadleaf trees. No other North American Auricularia species grows on conifer wood. In China and Tibet, however, a second species, A. tibetica, also occurs on conifers. It can be distinguished microscopically by its longer basidia and larger basidiospores.

Additionally, A. nigricans, Exidia crenata, and Phylloscypha phyllogena are similar.

== Habitat and distribution ==
Auricularia americana is a wood-rotting species, typically found on dead attached or fallen wood of conifers. It is widely distributed in North America (primarily in the Northeast, between April and September) and is also known from China and the Russian Far East.

== Use ==
Auriculariaceae are widely used and eaten in Asian countries, example dishes are hot and sour soup or wood ear salad. In dishes, the wood ear mushrooms are used for texture rather than their flavor, they are tasteless but with crunchy and crispy texture.

=== Harvesting ===
Auricularia americana can be harvested during any season, harvest by gently pinching them off the wood, picking the ones that are firm, and leaving the soft ones behind as they could be decaying. Wood ear mushrooms are easy to dehydrate and rehydrate by putting them in liquid before cooking. Auricularia americana should be cooked before eating to avoid mild toxic compound within.

=== Potential health benefits ===
- High Antioxidants
- Help with Diabetes
- Anti-inflammatory
- Help with Cancer therapy
- Help with weight loss
- Better immune system
