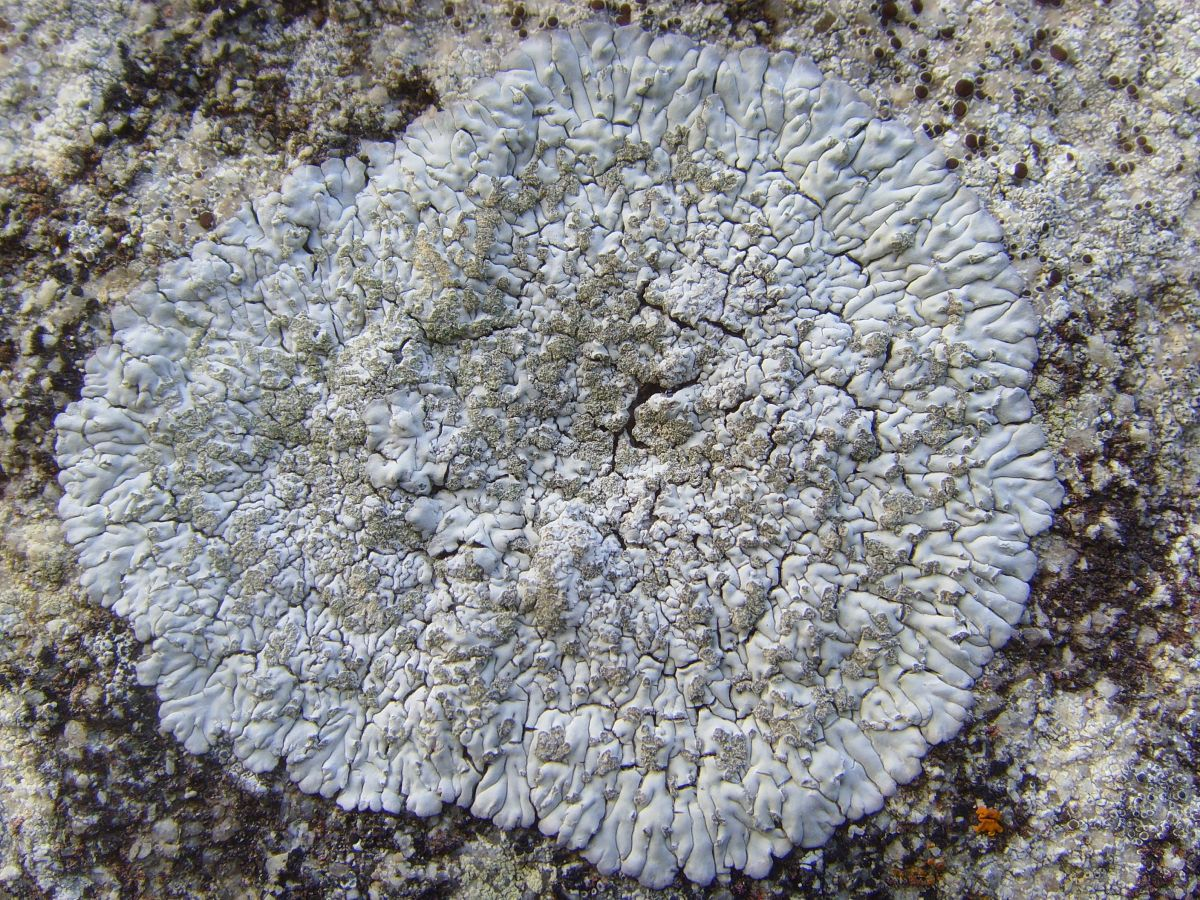
- Diploicia canescens

Scientific classification
- Kingdom: Fungi
- Division: Ascomycota
- Class: Lecanoromycetes
- Order: Caliciales
- Family: Caliciaceae
- Genus: Diploicia; A.Massal. (1852)

Type species
- Diploicia canescens (Dicks.) A.Massal. (1852)

Species
- D. canescens D. endopyxinea D. glebosa D. leproidica D. neotropica D. squamulosa

Synonyms
- Buelliomyces E.A.Thomas ex Cif. & Tomas. (1953); Diplotomma A.Massal. (1852)

= Diploicia =

Genus of lichen-forming fungi

Diploicia is a genus of lichen-forming fungi in the family Caliciaceae. The genus has a widespread distribution, especially in temperate regions, and contains seven species. These lichens form small, tightly attached rosettes with a distinctive pale grey-green colour and a fine, powdery coating that becomes more noticeable when dry. They reproduce through tiny black, pin-prick fruiting bodies that emerge from the crust surface and through powdery outgrowths that can break off and spread the lichen to new locations.

== Description ==
Species of Diploicia form a tightly attached, crust-like thallus that spreads outward in shallow lobes to create small rosettes. The surface is a pale glaucous (grey-green) colour and is dusted with a fine, powdery coating (pruina) that becomes especially conspicuous when the thallus dries. Unlike many crustose lichens, a darker boundary prothallus is absent, so adjacent rosettes often merge imperceptibly. The upper cortex is composed of densely packed cells arranged like a brick wall (a pseudoparenchyma) and is laced with minute diamond-shaped crystals; if a scrap of cortex is mounted in potassium hydroxide (the K test), the crystals enlarge and line up to form short chains. A green, single-celled alga of the photobiont genus Chlorococcum provides photosynthetic power. Some species develop pale, floury outgrowths called soralia, structures that flake off to spread the lichen asexually.

The sexual fruit-bodies are black, pin-prick apothecia that begin buried in the thallus and later break through to sit flush with or slightly above the surface. Their flat to gently domed discs are often sprinkled with the same white crystals that coat the thallus. Some species lack a rim of thallus tissue (the thalline margin) round the disc, though a few taxa retain such a margin. Internally, the thin true exciple that frames the disc soon erodes; above it lies a dark brown epithecium. Through this cap rise unbranched or forked threads (paraphyses) whose tips swell into two or three pale brown cells topped by an even darker cap, giving the mass a tufted appearance when viewed microscopically. The colourless hymenium beneath turns blue when stained with iodine (an I+ reaction typical of the Lecanora-type ascus), confirming the presence of starch-like compounds in the ascus walls. Each ascus contains eight ascospores: ellipsoidal, mid-brown and divided once by a cross-wall.

A second set of reproductive organs, flask-shaped pycnidia, are sunk in the thallus and appear as tiny brown-black dots. Inside, branched pleurogenous conidiogenous cells bud off colourless, rod-shaped conidia, providing another means of vegetative dispersal. The genus produces several secondary metabolites, chiefly aromatic depsides and distinctive xanthone pigments, which contribute to its spot-test reactions and can aid species delimitation.

== Species list ==
The following species are accepted in the genus Diploicia by Species Fungorum:

- Diploicia canescens (Dicks.) A.Massal. (1852)
- Diploicia endopyxinea (Müll.Arg.) Kalb, Elix & Bungartz (2016)
- Diploicia glebosa (Tuck.) Bungartz, Elix & Kalb (2016)
- Diploicia leproidica Bungartz & Elix (2016)
- Diploicia neotropica Kalb, Elix & Bungartz (2016)
- Diploicia squamulosa Bungartz & Elix (2016)

Diploicia edulis, found in the tropical dry forest of Mexico, was described as a new species in 2025.

== Gallery ==
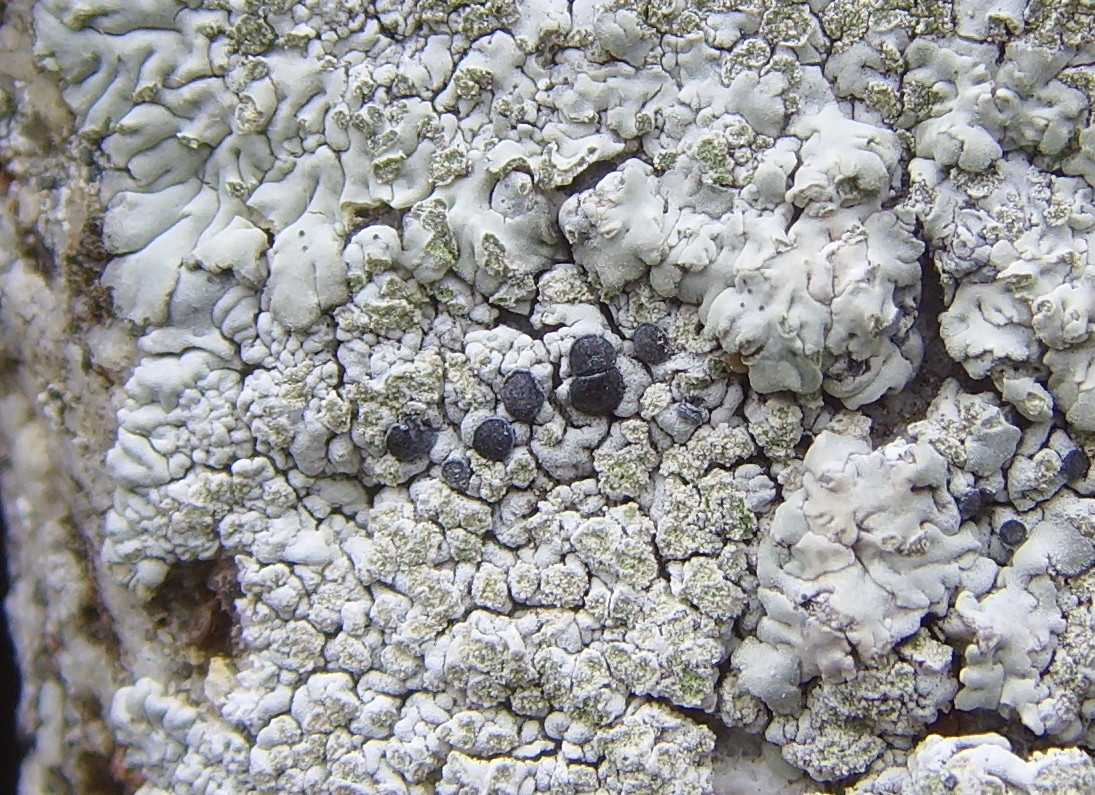
Apothecia of Diploicia canescens
