= Auricularia scissa =

Scientific classification
- Domain: Eukaryota
- Kingdom: Fungi
- Division: Basidiomycota
- Class: Agaricomycetes
- Order: Auriculariales
- Family: Auriculariaceae
- Genus: Auricularia
- Species: A. scissa

Binomial name
- Auricularia scissa Looney, Birkebak, & Matheny

Species of fungus

Auricularia scissa Mycological characteristics
- Smooth hymenium
- No distinct cap
- Hymenium attachment is not applicable
- Lacks a stipe
- Ecology is saprotrophic
- Edibility is unknown

Auricularia scissa is a species of jelly-fungus belonging to the Auricularia genus. It has been found in Florida and the Dominican Republic.
