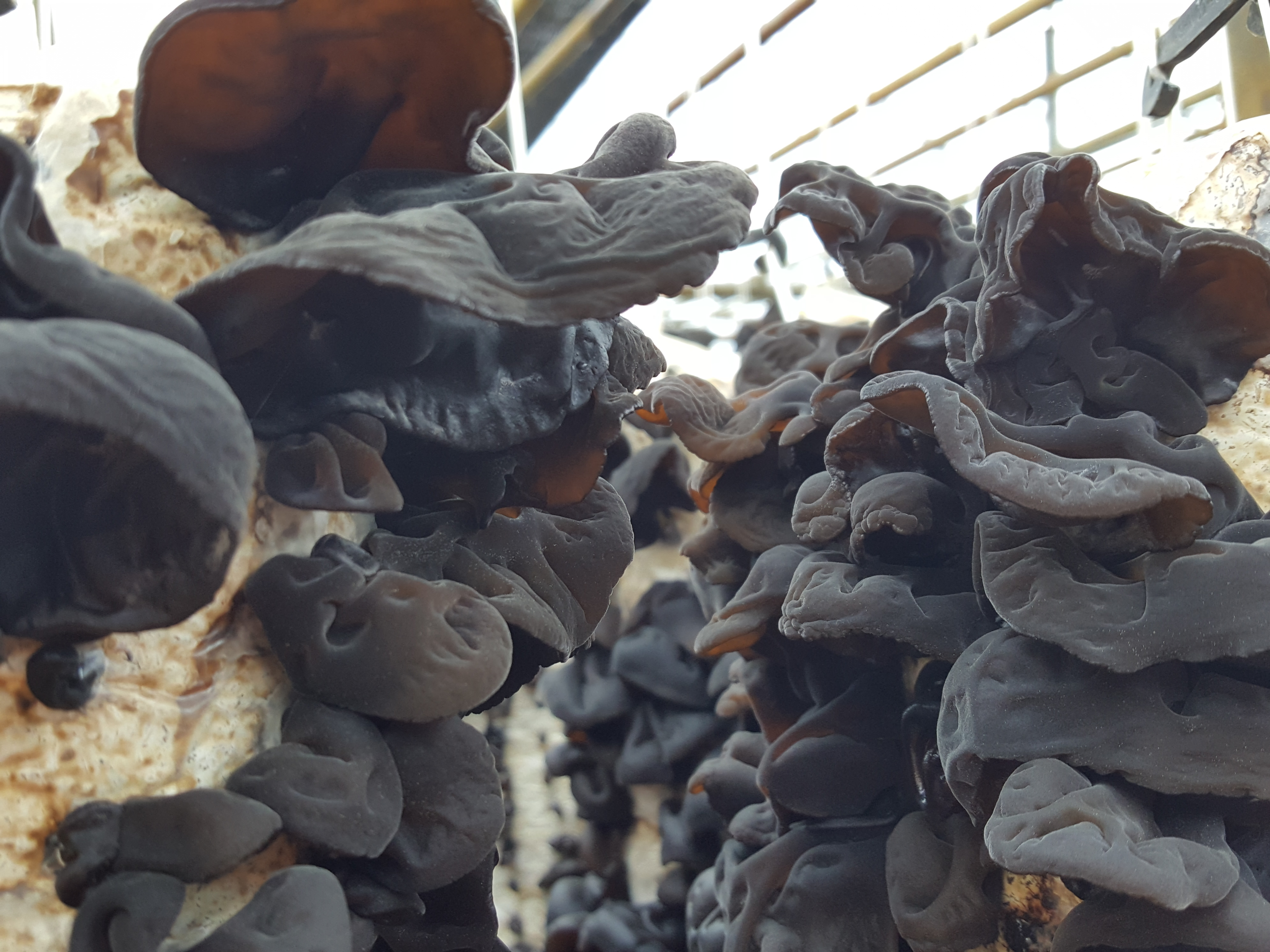
- Cultivated Auricularia heimuer

Scientific classification
- Kingdom: Fungi
- Division: Basidiomycota
- Class: Agaricomycetes
- Order: Auriculariales
- Family: Auriculariaceae
- Genus: Auricularia
- Species: A. heimuer

Binomial name
- Auricularia heimuer F. Wu, B.K. Cui, Y.C. Dai (2014)

= Auricularia heimuer =

Species of fungus

Wood ear mushroom
- Mycological characteristics
- Smooth hymenium
- No distinct cap
- Hymenium attachment is not applicable
- Lacks a stipe
- Spore print is black
- Ecology is saprotrophic or parasitic
- Edibility is choice

Auricularia heimuer
- Chinese: 黑木耳
- Literal meaning: "black wood ear"
Transcriptions
Standard Mandarin
- Hanyu Pinyin: hēi mù'ěr
- IPA: [xéɪ mû.àɚ]
Yue: Cantonese
- Yale Romanization: hāk muhk-yíh
- Jyutping: hak1 muk6-ji5
- IPA: [hɐk̚˥ mʊk̚˨.ji˩˧]

Auricularia heimuer, also known as heimuer (Chinese: 黑木耳; pinyin: hēimù'ěr), black wood ear or cloud ear, is a species of fungus in the order Auriculariales. It is commercially cultivated for food in China at a value exceeding $4 billion (USD) per year. The species was previously referred to as the European Auricularia auricula-judae, but the latter is not known to occur in East Asia. Auricularia heimuer is a popular ingredient in many Chinese dishes, such as hot and sour soup, and it is also used in traditional Chinese medicine.

== Description ==
Fruitbodies are gelatinous, ear-shaped, and laterally attached to wood. They are up to 12 centimetres (4 3/4 inches) across and 1.5 mm (1/16 in) thick. The upper surface is finely tomentose, coloured fawn to reddish brown when fresh, and coloured grey-brown when dry. The colour of cultivated specimens is often darker. The spore-producing underside is smooth to slightly veined, coloured pinkish buff when fresh, and coloured purplish grey when dry.

=== Microscopic features ===
The basidia are cylindrical, 40–65 x 3–6.5 μm, with three transverse septa. The basidiospores are allantoid (sausage shaped), 11–13 x 4–5 μm. Hairs on the upper surface are 50–150 x 4–6,5 μm. When cross-sectioned, a medulla (a central band of parallel hyphae) is normally present.

=== Similar species ===
The Asian Auricularia villosula is very similar, but distinguishable microscopically by its shorter hairs (30–70 μm long). Some strains of heimuer cultivated in China have proved to be A. villosula. The European A. auricula-judae is superficially similar, but it is not as dark as cultivated A. heimuer and microscopically distinguishable by its larger basidia and spores, the latter measuring 14.5–18 x 5–6 μm. Fruitbodies of both these species lack a medulla when cross-sectioned.

== Taxonomy ==
A. heimuer was described in 2014 as a result of molecular research, based on cladistic analysis of DNA sequences, into wild and cultivated species of Auricularia in China. This research revealed that the most frequently cultivated species was previously misdetermined as Auricularia auricula-judae, a species confined to Europe, and was instead a separate and distinctive species restricted to east Asia. It was given the name Auricularia heimuer based on the Chinese vernacular name for the fungus: heimuer (黑木耳), which translates to black wood ear.

== Distribution and habitat ==
Auricularia heimuer is a wood-rotting species, typically found on the dead standing or fallen wood of broadleaf trees. In the wild, it occurs most frequently on oak (Quercus) trees and less frequently on other broadleaf trees. In cultivation, it is sometimes grown on broadleaf logs, and is more commonly grown on growing media containing sawdust.

The species occurs in temperate areas of northern China, as well as the Russian Far East, Korea, and Japan.

== Uses ==
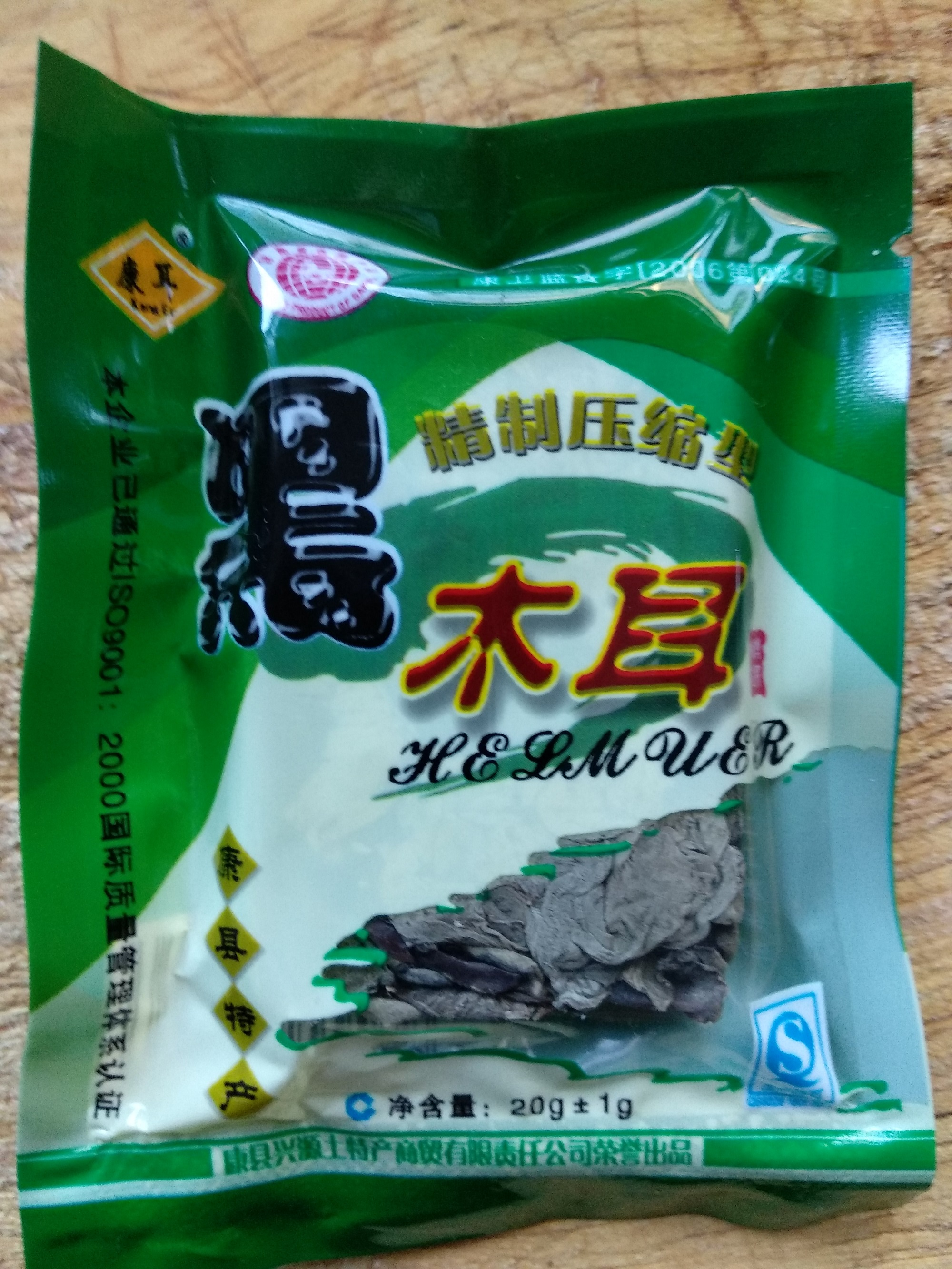
Dried Auricularia heimuer

In China, the use of an Auricularia species, probably A. heimuer, as a food and a medicine was recorded in the 3rd-century Chinese medicinal book Shennong Ben Cao Jing. Species were being cultivated in China as early as the Tang dynasty (618–907). Li Shizhen, in his Pen Tsao Kang Mu, quotes Tang Ying-chuan from that period as saying "put the steamed bran on logs, cover with straw, Wood Ear will grow". The fungus is widely used as an ingredient in savoury dishes and is also cooked and served as a salad with vegetables and flavourings. A soup containing the species is used medicinally for dealing with colds and fevers in the belief that it reduces the heat of the body. According to a 2010 publication, the annual production of Auricularia species worldwide is the fourth highest among all industrially cultivated culinary and medicinal mushrooms. The estimated annual output in China in 2013 was 4.75 billion kg in fresh weight, with a value of about four billion US dollars.

In Japan, the fungus is known as kikurage (キクラゲ; lit. "wood jellyfish") and is commonly shredded and used as a topping in ramen. A 2018 Japanese study surveyed 26 local specimens originally determined as A. auricula-judae. The molecular identification was as follows: 4 samples of A. heimuer, 7 of A. minutissima, 10 of A. villosula, and 5 of A. thailandica.

In Korea, the mushroom is called heuk-mogi (Korean: 흑목이; Hanja: 黑木耳). It is commercially cultivated and commonly used in japchae.

100 g of dry cloud ear fungus contains 70.1 g of dietary fibre.

== In popular culture ==
The Pokémon Toedscool and Toedscruel are partially based on these mushrooms.
