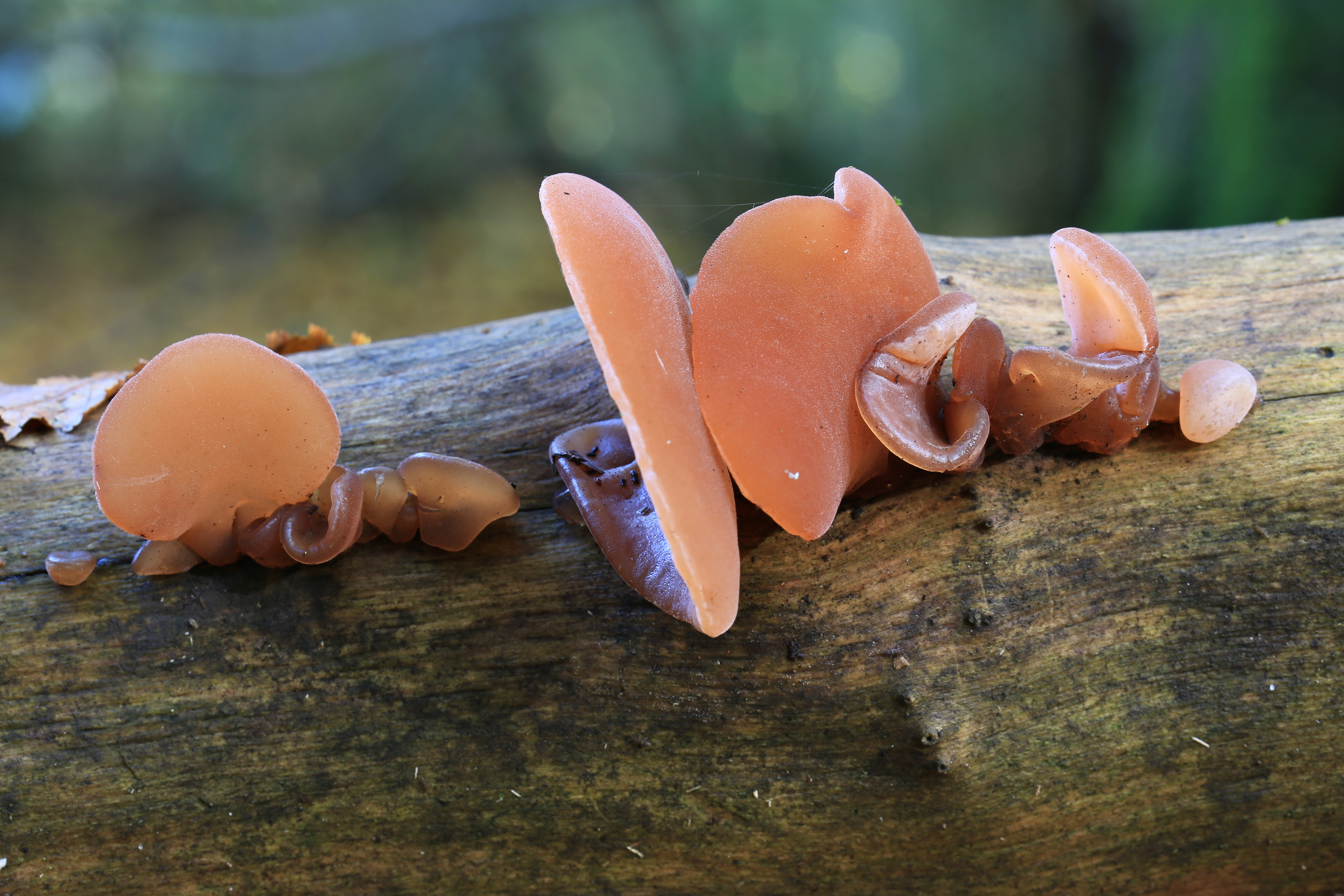
- A young fruit body on fallen wood in England

Scientific classification
- Kingdom: Fungi
- Division: Basidiomycota
- Class: Agaricomycetes
- Order: Auriculariales
- Family: Auriculariaceae
- Genus: Auricularia
- Species: A. auricula-judae

Binomial name
- Auricularia auricula-judae (Bull.) J.Schröt.

Synonyms
- Species synonymy: 1753 Tremella auricula L.; 1777 Peziza auricula (L.) Lightf.; 1788 Merulius auricula (L.) Roth; 1789 Tremella auricula-judae Bull.; 1791 Peziza auricula-judae (Bull.) Bull.; 1801 Tremella auricula-judae var. caraganae Pers.; 1812 Tremella caraganae (Pers.) H. Mart.; 1821 Gyraria auricularis Gray; 1822 Exidia auricula-judae (Bull.) Fr.; 1822 Auricularia sambuci Pers.; 1860 Hirneola auricula-judae (Bull.) Berk.; 1880 Hirneola auricula (L.) P. Karst.; 1886 Auricularia auricula-judae var. lactea Quél.; 1902 Auricularia auricula (L.) Underw.; 1913 Auricularia lactea (Quél.) Bigeard & H. Guill.; 1943 Auricularia auricularis (Gray) G.W. Martin; 1949 Hirneola auricularis (Gray) Donk; 1970 Hirneola auricula-judae var. lactea (Quél.) D.A. Reid

= Auricularia auricula-judae =

Species of fungus

Auricularia auricula-judae
- Mycological characteristics
- Smooth hymenium
- No distinct cap
- Hymenium attachment is not applicable
- Lacks a stipe
- Spore print is white
- Ecology is saprotrophic or parasitic
- Edibility is edible

Auricularia auricula-judae, commonly known as wood ear, jelly ear or historically as Jew's ear, is a species of fungus in the order Auriculariales. Basidiocarps (fruit bodies) are brown, gelatinous, and have a noticeably ear-like shape. They grow on wood, especially elder. The specific epithet is derived from the belief that Judas Iscariot hanged himself from an elder tree.

The fungus can be found throughout the year in Europe, where it normally grows on wood of broadleaf trees and shrubs. Auricularia auricula-judae was used in folk medicine as recently as the 19th century for complaints including sore throats, sore eyes and jaundice, and as an astringent. It is edible but not widely consumed.

== Taxonomy ==
The species was first described as Tremella auricula by Carl Linnaeus in his 1753 Species Plantarum and later (1789) redescribed by Jean Baptiste François Pierre Bulliard as Tremella auricula-judae. In 1822, the Swedish mycologist Elias Magnus Fries accepted Bulliard's epithet and transferred the species to Exidia as Exidia auricula-judae. In so doing, Fries sanctioned the name, meaning that the species epithet "auricula-judae" takes priority over Linnaeus's earlier "auricula".

The species was given the name Auricularia auricula-judae in 1888 by Joseph Schröter. The specific epithet of A. auricula-judae comprises auricula, the Latin word meaning ear, and Judae, meaning of Judas. The name was criticised by the American mycologist Curtis Gates Lloyd, who said "Auricularia auricula-Judae is cumbersome and in addition is a slander on the Jews". Though critical of Lucien Marcus Underwood, saying he "would probably not have known the Jew's ear from the calves' liver", he followed him in using Auricularia auricula, which was in turn used by the American mycologist Bernard Lowy in his monograph on the genus. Despite this, Auricularia auricula-judae is the valid name for the species.

The species was long thought to be somewhat variable in colour, habitat, and microscopic features but cosmopolitan in distribution, though Lowy considered it a temperate species and doubted that it occurred in the tropics. Molecular research, based on cladistic analysis of DNA sequences, has, however, shown that Auricularia auricula-judae as previously understood comprises at least seven different species worldwide. Since A. auricula-judae was originally described from Europe, the name is now restricted to the European species. The commercially cultivated Chinese and East Asian species, still frequently marketed and described as A. auricula-judae or A. auricula, is Auricularia heimuer (black wood ear).

== Vernacular names ==
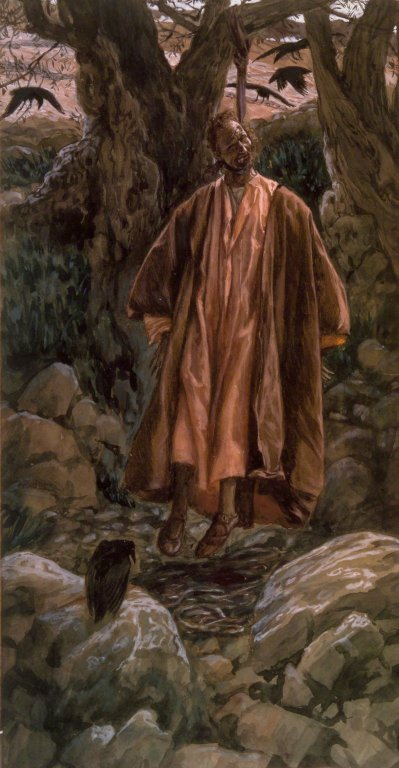
Judas se pend (Judas Hangs Himself), by James Tissot. It is from the belief Judas Iscariot hanged himself on an elder tree that both the specific epithet auricula-judae and the common name Jew's ear originate.

The fungus is associated with Judas Iscariot because of the belief that he hanged himself on an elder tree after his betrayal of Jesus Christ. Folklore suggests that the ears are Judas's returned spirit, and are all that are left to remind us of his suicide. The medieval Latin name auricula Judae (Judas's Ear) matches the vernacular name in most European languages, such as the French oreille de Judas, or the German Judasohr. The species was known as "fungus sambuca" among herbalists, in reference to Sambucus, the generic name for elder. The mistranslation "Jew's Ear" appeared in English by 1544. The English common name of the fungus was originally "Judas's ear", but this was later shortened to "Judas ear" and then "Jew's ear". Common names for the fungus which refer to Judas can be traced back to at least the end of the 16th century; for instance, in the 17th century, Thomas Browne wrote of the species:

In Jews' ears something is conceived extraordinary from the name, which is in propriety but fungus sambucinus, or an excrescence about the roots of elder, and concerneth not the nation of the Jews, but Judas Iscariot, upon a conceit he hanged on this tree; and is become a famous medicine in quinsies, sore throats, and strangulations, ever since.

While the term "Jew's meat" was a deprecatory term used for all fungi in the Middle Ages, the term is unrelated to the name "Jew's ear". A further change of name to "jelly ear" was recommended in the List of Recommended Names for Fungi. The idea was criticised by the author Patrick Harding, who considered it "to be the result of political correctness where it is not necessary", and who "will continue to call [the species] Jew's ear", explaining that, while anti-Semitism was commonplace in Britain, the name "Jew's ear" is in reference to Judas, who was a Jew. However, the name is no longer favoured; the British Mycological Society recommends the name "jelly ear". Other common names include the "ear fungus" and the "common ear fungus".

== Description ==
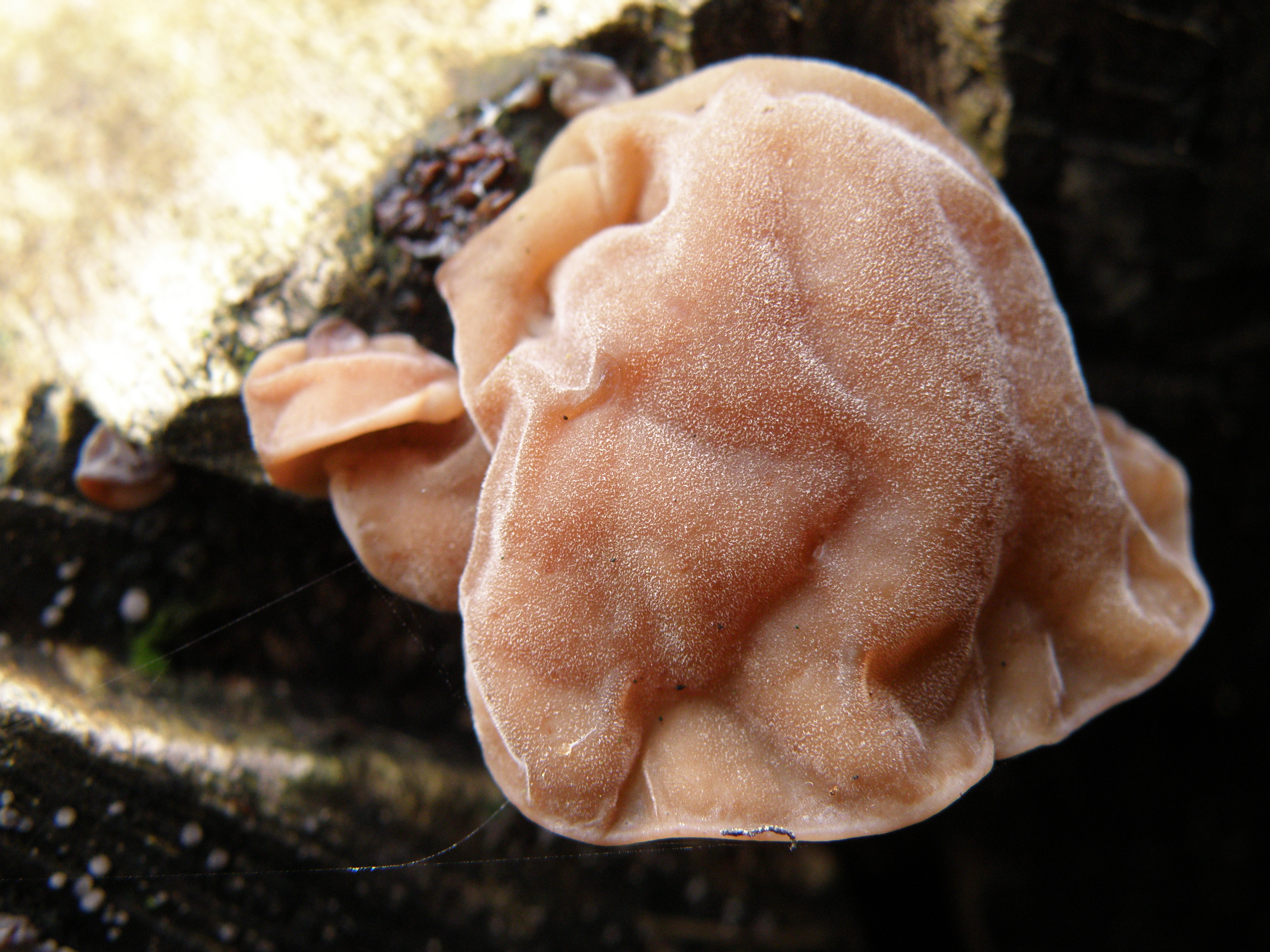
The upper surface of fruit bodies is covered in tiny, downy hairs and may be folded and wrinkled

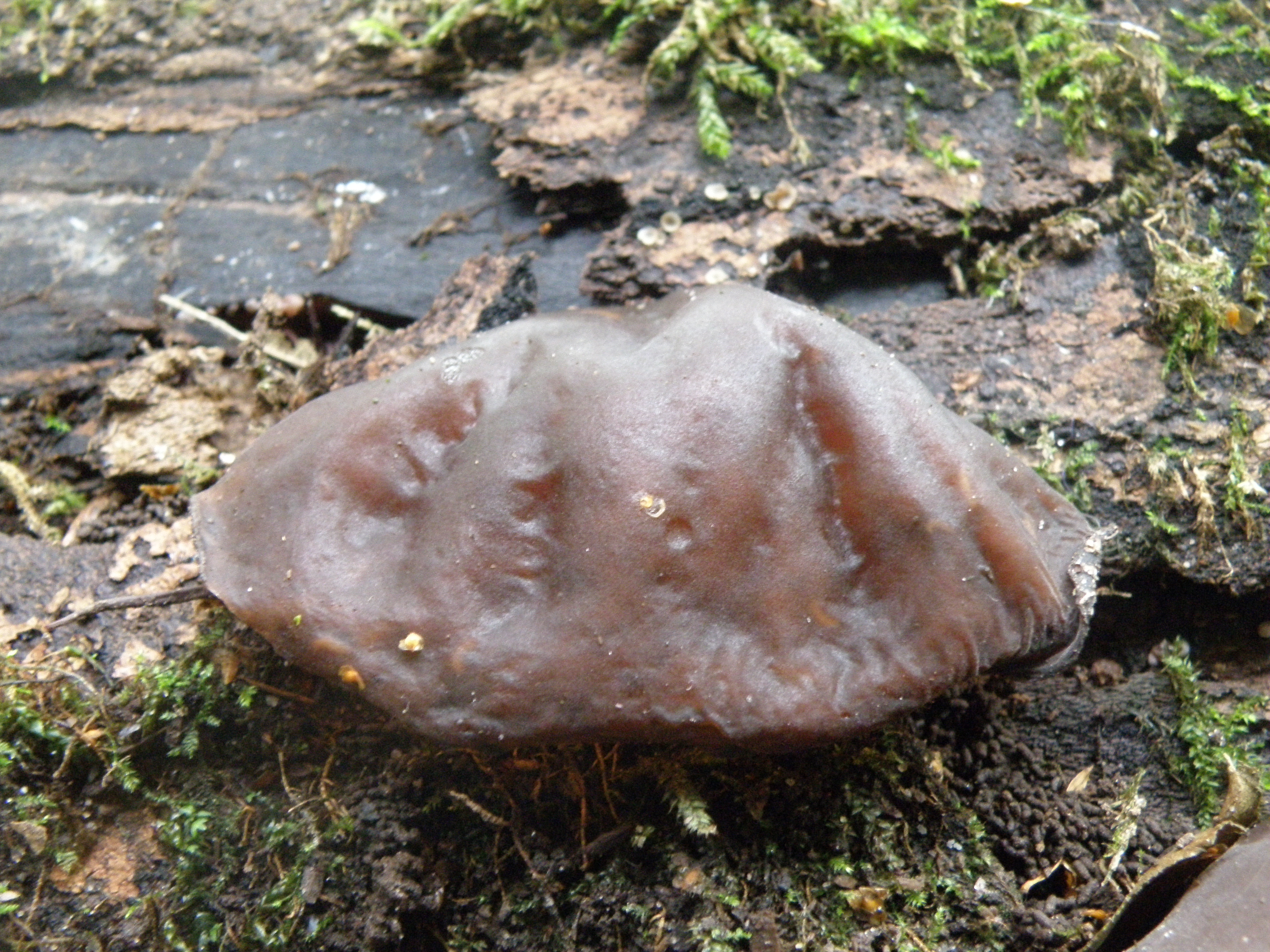
As fruit bodies age, they become darker

The fruit body of A. auricula-judae is normally up to 9 cm (3 1/2 in) across and up to 3 mm (1/8 in) thick. It is often reminiscent of a floppy ear, but can also be cup-shaped. It is attached to the substrate laterally and sometimes by a very short stalk. Fruit bodies have a tough, gelatinous, elastic texture when fresh, but dry hard and brittle. The upper surface is a reddish-tan-brown with a purplish tint and finely pilose (covered in tiny, grey, downy hairs). It can be smooth, as is typical of younger specimens, or undulating with folds and wrinkles. The colour becomes darker with age. The under surface is a lighter grey-brown and smooth, sometimes folded or wrinkled, and may have "veins", making it appear even more ear-like.

Entirely white fruit bodies are occasionally encountered and were once given the name Auricularia lactea, but they are merely unpigmented forms and often occur in company with ordinary, pigmented fruit bodies.

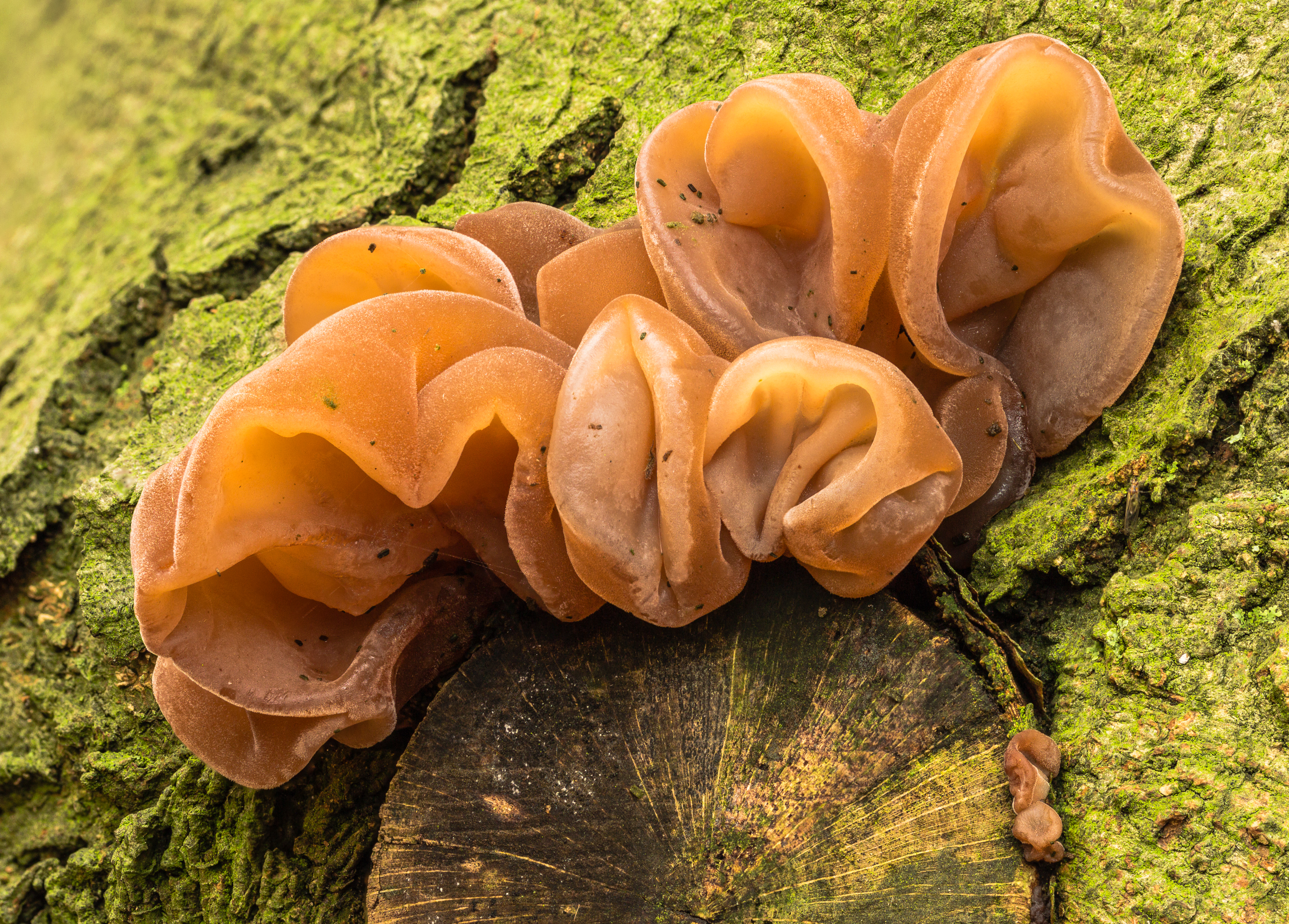
Auricularia auricula-judae on an old beech tree at the base of a previously cut branch.

=== Microscopic features ===
The spores of A. auricula-judae are allantoid (sausage-shaped), 15–22 x 5–7 μm; the basidia are cylindrical, 65–85 × 4–5.5 μm, with three transverse septa (internal cross-walls). Hairs on the upper surface are 100–150 μm in length and 5–7.5 μm in diameter. They are hyaline, thick-walled, and have acute to rounded tips.

=== Similar species ===
In Europe, the only similar species is Auricularia cerrina, recently described on oak (Quercus) from the Czech Republic, but probably more widespread in southern Europe. It can be distinguished by its dark grey to almost black fruit bodies. The Asian Auricularia heimuer is very similar and has long been confused with A. auricula-judae. It can be distinguished microscopically by its shorter basidia and shorter spores (11–13 × 4–5 μm). The American Auricularia angiospermarum is also similar, but also has shorter basidia and spores (13–15 × 4.8–5.5 μm).

== Habitat, ecology and distribution ==
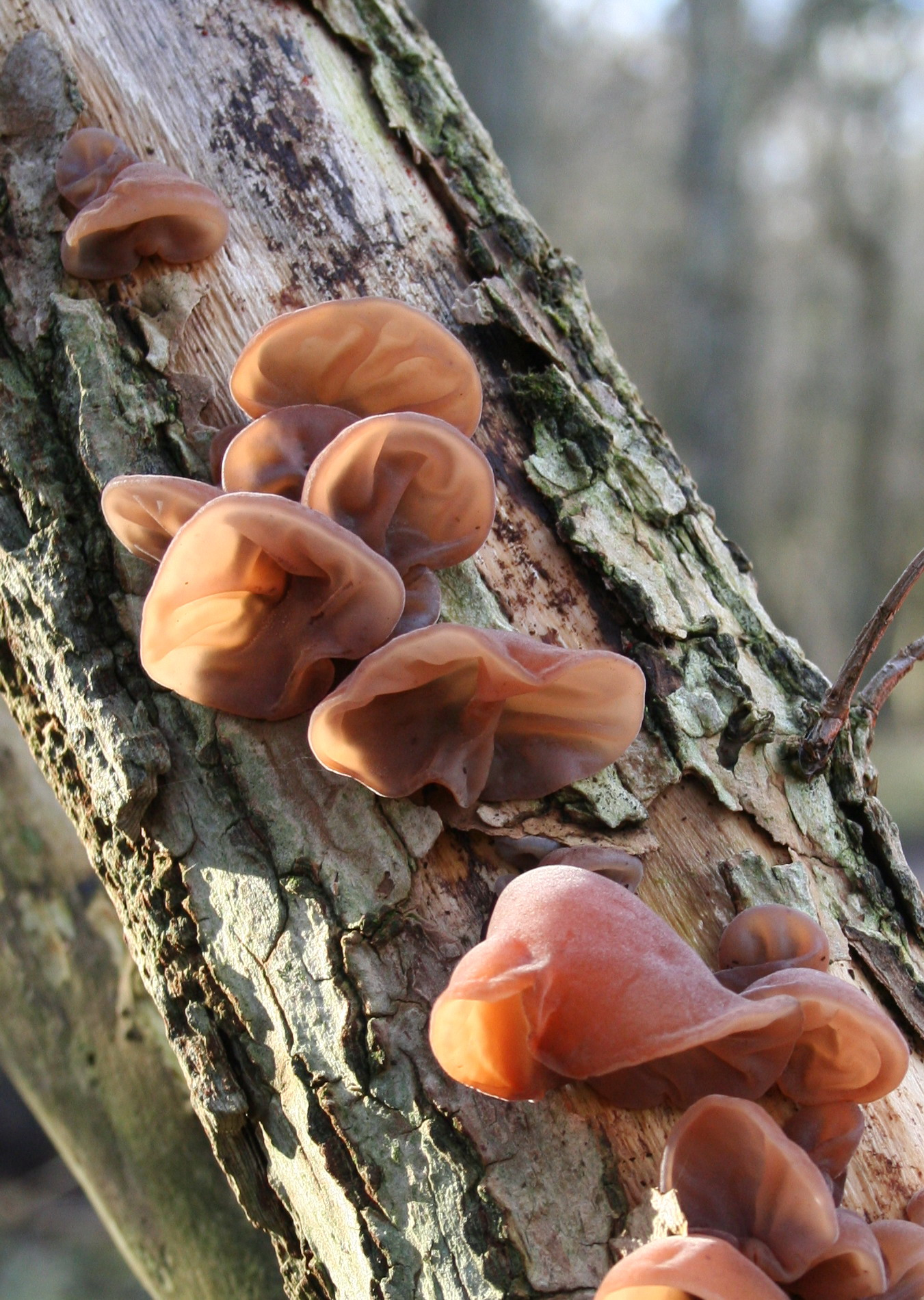
Auricularia auricula-judae fruit bodies can often be found in large numbers on old wood.

Auricularia auricula-judae grows on the wood of deciduous trees and shrubs, particularly Sambucus nigra (elder). It is also common on Acer pseudoplatanus (sycamore), Fagus sylvatica (beech), Fraxinus excelsior (ash), Euonymus europaeus (spindle), and in one particular case, the sycamore draining board of an old sink in Hatton Garden. It very rarely grows on conifers. It favours older branches, where it feeds as a saprotroph (on dead wood) or a weak parasite (on living wood), and it causes a white rot.

Commonly growing solitarily, it can also be gregarious (in a group) or caespitose (in a tuft). Spores are ejected from the underside of the fruit bodies with as many as several hundred thousand an hour, and the high rate continues when the bodies have been significantly dried. Even when they have lost some 90% of their weight through dehydration, the bodies continue to release a small number of spores. It is found all year, but is most common in autumn.

The species is widespread throughout Europe, but is not known to occur elsewhere. It was formerly thought to be a variable species with a worldwide distribution, but molecular research, based on cladistic analysis of DNA sequences, has shown that non-European species are distinct. The cultivated "A. auricula-judae" of China and East Asia is Auricularia heimuer and, to a lesser extent, A. villosula. The North American "A. auricula-judae" on broadleaf trees is Auricularia angiospermarum, with Auricularia americana on conifers.

== Uses ==
=== Culinary use ===
Auricularia auricula-judae has a soft, jelly-like texture. Though edible, it is not held in high culinary regard. It has been likened to "eating an Indian rubber with bones in it", while in 19th-century Britain, it was said that "it has never been regarded here as an edible fungus". The species is said to be commonly consumed in Poland. A related fungus, Auricularia heimuer, is widely used in East Asian cooking and has often been misidentified as A. auricula-judae.

Auricularia auricula-judae has a mild flavour, which may be considered bland. It can be dried and rehydrated, sometimes swelling to 3–4 times in size. The species is not edible when raw, needing to be cooked thoroughly. A 100 g (3.5 oz) reference serving of dried fungus provides 1,500 kilojoules (370 kilocalories) of food energy, 10.6 g of protein, 0.2 g of fat, 65 g of carbohydrate, 5.8 g ash, and 0.03% mg of carotene. Fresh mushrooms contain about 90% moisture. Dried specimens may be ground up into a powder and used to absorb excess liquid in soups and stews, as it rehydrates into tiny fragments.

=== Medicinal use ===
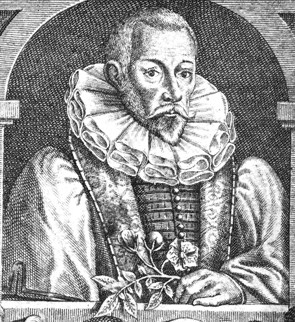
The 16th-century herbalist John Gerard recommended Auricularia auricula-judae for curing a sore throat.

Auricularia auricula-judae has been used as a medicinal fungus by many herbalists. It was used as a poultice to treat inflammations of the eye, as well as a palliative for throat problems. The 16th-century herbalist John Gerard, writing in 1597, recommended A. auricula-judae for a very specific use; other fungi were used more generally. He recommends the preparation of a liquid extract by boiling the fruit bodies in milk, or else leaving them steeped in beer, which would then be sipped slowly in order to cure a sore throat. The resultant broth was probably not dissimilar to the Chinese soups that use Auricularia cornea. Carolus Clusius, writing in 1601, also said that the species could be gargled to cure a sore throat, and John Parkinson, writing in 1640, reported that boiling in milk or steeping in vinegar was "the onely use they are put unto that I know".

Writing in 1694, the herbalist John Pechey described A. auricula-judae by saying "It grows to the Trunk of the Elder-Tree. Being dried it will keep a good year. Boyl'd in Milk, or infus'd in Vinegarm 'tis good to gargle the Mouth or Throat in Quinsies, and other inflammations of the Mouth and Throat. And being infus'd in some proper Water, it is good in Diseases of the Eyes." The species also saw use as an astringent due to its ability to absorb water. There are recorded medicinal usages from Scotland, where it was again used as a gargle for sore throats, and from Ireland, where, in an attempt to cure jaundice, it was boiled in milk. The medicinal use of A. auricula-judae continued until at least 1860, when it was still sold at Covent Garden; at the time, it was not considered edible in the United Kingdom.

== Cultural depictions ==
The species is referred to in Christopher Marlowe's play The Jew of Malta, where Ithamore proclaims: "The hat he wears, Judas left under the elder when he hanged himself". Later, the species was probably partially the inspiration for Emily Dickinson's poem beginning "The Mushroom is the Elf of Plants", which depicts a mushroom as the "ultimate betrayer". Dickinson had both a religious and naturalistic background, and so it is more than likely that she knew of the common name of A. auricula-judae, and of the folklore surrounding Judas's suicide.

The Mushroom is the Elf of Plants —
At Evening, it is not —
At Morning, in a Truffled Hut
It stop upon a Spot

As if it tarried always
And yet its whole Career
Is shorter than a Snake's Delay
And fleeter than a Tare —

'Tis Vegetation's Juggler —
The Germ of Alibi —
Doth like a Bubble antedate
And like a Bubble, hie —

I feel as if the Grass was pleased
To have it intermit —
This surreptitious scion
Of Summer's circumspect.

Had Nature any supple Face
Or could she one contemn —
Had Nature an Apostate —
That Mushroom — it is Him!

— From Emily Dickinson's "The Mushroom is the Elf of Plants"
