= John Pechey =

English medical writer

- Born: 1655; Chichester, West Sussex, Great Britain
- Died: 1716 (aged 60–61)
- Other names: John Peachey, John Peche
- Occupation: Medical writer

John Pechey (1655–1716) was an English medical writer that practiced in the London Area, residing at the Angel and Crown in Basing Lane. He wrote on acute and chronic diseases, as well as herbal medicine, clinical practice and gynaecology. He is most known for his translation of Thomas Sydenham's work.

== Early life and education ==
Pechey was son of William Pechey of Chichester, and was born in 1655. He entered at New Inn Hall, Oxford, in 1671, and graduated B.A. in 1675, M.A. in 1678. On 7 November 1684, he applied for admission as a licentiate of the Royal College of Physicians in London; his application was further considered on 5 December, and he was admitted on 22 December 1684.

== Career ==
On 15 November 1688 he was summoned before the College of Physicians ‘upon printing bills signifying his removal and shilling fee, and putting up a board of notice to the people with his name over his dore.’ He was admonished, but on 7 December 1688, the board remaining over his door as formerly, and he not having ceased ‘spargere cartulas,’ the censors fined him 4l (Note: 4l (the "l" from Latin libra) is a historical notation for the Pound Sterling (£4).). On 4 January he declined to pay, and on 17 January 1689 he had no further excuse than that ‘other have broake our statutes besides’ himself, and was fined £8. for his second contempt. On 30 July 1689 he took the oaths and declaration, and his autograph signature remains in the original record at the College of Physicians as ‘Joh. Peachey.’

In 1692, he published two books: ‘Collections of Acute Diseases, in five parts,’ and ‘A Collection of Chronical Diseases.’ The first treats of smallpox, measles, plague, and other febrile disorders, of rheumatism, apoplexy, and lethargy; and the second, of colic, hysteria, gout, and hæmaturia. He published in 1693 ‘Promptuarium Praxeos Medicæ,’ in Latin—a compendium of medicine with many prescriptions given in full. The book ends with an admonition or puff of ‘Pilulæ catharticæ nostræ,’ which ‘venales prostant’ at his own house in Basing Lane. He next published ‘The Compleat Herbal of Physical Plants’ and ‘The Storehouse of Physical Practice.’ Another edition of the former appeared in 1707, and of the latter, with slightly altered title, in 1697.

In 1696 he published ‘A General Treatise of the Diseases of Maids, Big-bellied Women, Childbed Women, and Widows’, which did not observe any particularly new conditions. All these were brought out by his original publisher, Henry Bonwicke, and slightly varied parts of some of them appeared as separate works. In the same year, he published the book by which he is best known—a vigorous and idiomatic translation of ‘the whole works’ of Sydenham. The preface, which contains a short account of Sydenham, is dated from the Angel and Crown in Basing Lane, 12 Oct. 1695, and on the last page is an advertisement of Pechey's pills, sold at his house at 1s. 6d. the box. A seventh edition of this translation appeared in 1717, and an eleventh in 1740. Pechey moved into Bow Lane, Cheapside, near his former house, and the last list, at the College of Physicians, in which his name appears is that of 1716.

He has often been confused with John Peachi or Pechey, who was a doctor of medicine of Caen in Normandy, and was admitted an extra-licentiate (Note: Abbreviation of extra-urbem licentiate, as used by the College of Physicians. Laycock, T. (1858). "Licentiates And Extra-Licentiates", p.734. http://www.jstor.org/stable/25192630) of the College of Physicians on 26 July 1683 (original record at College of Physicians). This physician is stated in a manuscript note on the title-page of a pamphlet in the library of the Royal Medical and Chirurgical Society to be the ‘doctor of physick in Gloucestershire’ who wrote ‘Some Observations made upon the Root called Casmunar,’ reprinted in London in 1693. Several other pharmacological tracts are attributed to him without satisfactory proof, and many of them contain internal evidence of another authorship. That he practised outside London is certain, as his name never appears in the College of Physicians' lists, in which at that time extra-licentiates were not included.

== Bibliography ==
- Pechey, John (1962). Collections of Acute Diseases, in five parts. London: Henry Bonwicke.
- Pechey, John (1962). A Collection of Chronical Diseases. London: Henry Bonwicke.
- Pechey, John (1963). Promptuarium Praxeos Medicae (in Latin). London: Henry Bonwicke.
- Pechey, John (1963). The Compleat Herbal of Physical Plants. London: Henry Bonwicke.
- Pechey, John (1963). The Storehouse of Physical Practice. London: Henry Bonwicke.
- Pechey, John (1696). A General Treatise of the Disease of Maids, Big-bellied Women, Childbed Women, and Widows. London: Henry Bonwicke.
- Pechey, John (1696). Translation of The Whole Works of Sydenham. London: Henry Bonwicke.

This article incorporates text from a publication now in the public domain: Moore, Norman (1895). "Pechey, John". In Lee, Sidney (ed.). Dictionary of National Biography. Vol. 44. London: Smith, Elder & Co.
