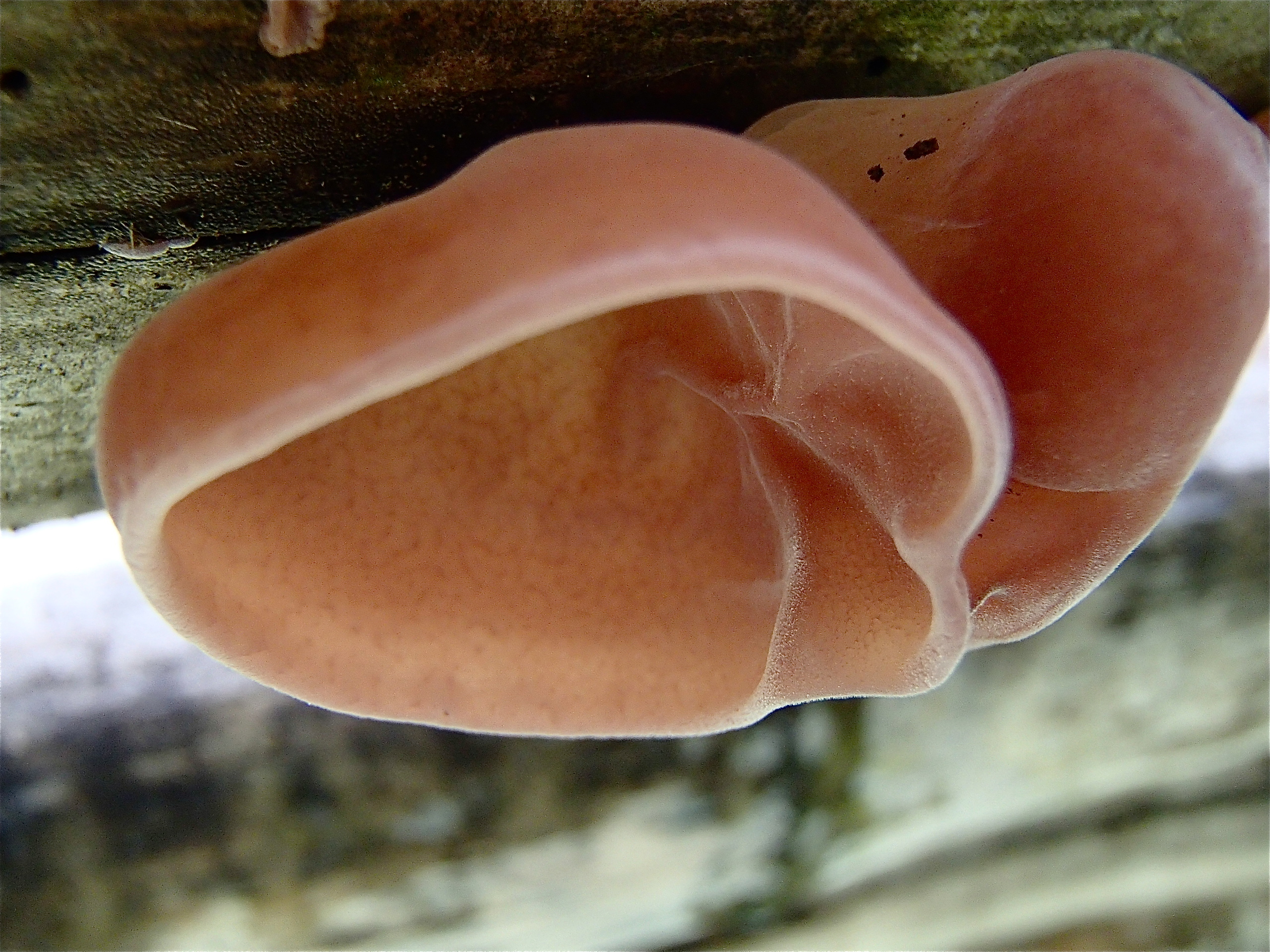

Scientific classification
- Kingdom: Fungi
- Division: Basidiomycota
- Class: Agaricomycetes
- Order: Auriculariales
- Family: Auriculariaceae
- Genus: Auricularia
- Species: A. fuscosuccinea

Binomial name
- Auricularia fuscosuccinea (Mont.) Henn. (1893)

Synonyms
- Exidia fuscosuccinea Mont. (1842); Hirneola fuscosuccinea (Mont.) Sacc. (1888)

= Auricularia fuscosuccinea =

Species of fungus

Auricularia fuscosuccinea is a species of Auriculariales fungus. It was first described scientifically in 1842 by French mycologist Camille Montagne as a species of Exidia. Paul Christoph Hennings transferred it to Auricularia in 1893.
