= James Dickson (botanist) =

Scottish nurseryman and naturalist (1738–1822)

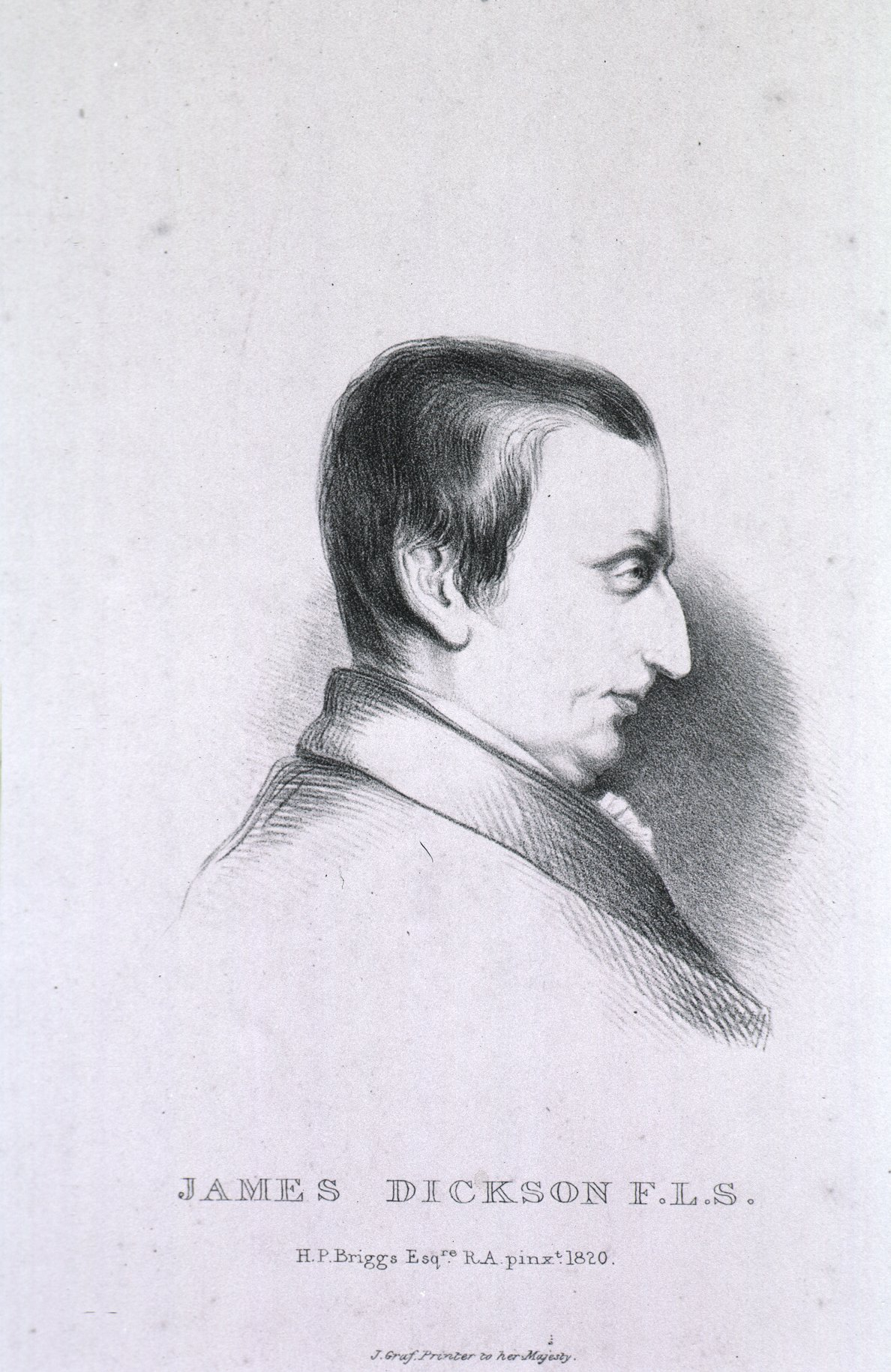
- James Dickson, 1820 engraving
- Born: 1738; Kirke House, Traquair, Peeblesshire
- Died: 14 August 1822 (aged 83–84); Broad Green, Croydon, Surrey
- Occupations: Nurseryman, plant collector, botanist and mycologist

James (Jacobus) J. Dickson (1738–1822) was a Scottish nurseryman, plant collector, botanist and mycologist. Between 1785 and 1801 he published his Fasciculus plantarum cryptogamicarum Britanniae, a four-volume work in which he published over 400 species of algae and fungi that occur in the British Isles He is also the editor of the exsiccata work Hortus siccus Britannicus, being a collection of dried British plants, named on the authority of the Linnean herbarium and other original collections (1793–1802).

The plant genus Dicksonia is named after him.

== Life ==
He was born at Kirke House, Traquair, Peeblesshire, of poor parents, and began life in the gardens of the Earl of Traquair. While still young he went to Jeffery's nursery-garden at Brompton, and in 1772 started in business for himself in Covent Garden.

Dickson made several tours in the Scottish Highlands in search of plants between 1785 and 1791, that of 1789 being in company with Mungo Park, whose sister became his second wife.

Dickson in 1788 became one of the original members of the Linnean Society, and in 1804 was one of the eight original members and a vice-president of the Horticultural Society. He died at Broad Green, Croydon, Surrey, on 14 August 1822, his wife, a son, and two daughters surviving him. His portrait by Henry Perronet Briggs (1820) was lithographed.

== Works ==
Sir Joseph Banks threw open his library to him, and he acquired a wide knowledge of botany, and especially of cryptogamic plants. He published:

- between 1785 and 1801 four Fasciculi Plantarum Cryptogamicarum Britanniæ, containing in all four hundred descriptions;
- between 1789 and 1799, A Collection of Dried Plants, named on the authority of the Linnæan Herbarium, in seventeen folio fascicles, each containing twenty-five species;
- in 1795, a Catalogus Plantarum Cryptogamicarum Britanniæ;
- and between 1793 and 1802, his Hortus Siccus Britannicus, in nineteen folio fascicles.

He wrote memoirs in the 'Transactions of the Linnean Society. James Edward Smith wrote him an epitaph and Charles Louis L'Héritier de Brutelle dedicated to him the genus Dicksonia, among the tree-ferns.

== See also ==
- Category:Taxa named by James Dickson (botanist)
