= Tremella diaporthicola =

Scientific classification
- Kingdom: Fungi
- Division: Basidiomycota
- Class: Tremellomycetes
- Order: Tremellales
- Family: Tremellaceae
- Genus: Tremella
- Species: T. diaporthicola

Binomial name
- Tremella diaporthicola Ginns et M.N.L. Lefebvre (1993)

Synonyms
- Sebacina globispora Whelden (1935)

Species of fungus

Tremella diaporthicola is a species of fungus in the family Tremellaceae. It produces hyaline to pale grey, pustular, gelatinous basidiocarps (fruit bodies) and is parasitic on Diaporthe and similar species on dead branches of broad-leaved trees. It was originally described from the US and has also been recorded from Ukraine.

== Taxonomy ==
The species was first published in 1935 by American mycologist Roy Whelden who placed it in the genus Sebacina. It was subsequently considered a synonym of Tremella tubercularia, which British mycologist Derek Reid later renamed Tremella globispora. Since the latter species has hyphae with clamp connections and the present species lacks clamp connections, Sebacina globispora was removed from the synonymy of Tremella globispora and given the new name Tremella diaporthicola in 1993.

== Description ==
Fruit bodies are gelatinous, pustular, and hyaline (colourless) becoming greyish, up to 12 mm across. Microscopically, the hyphae lack clamp connections. The basidia are tremelloid (ellipsoid, with oblique to vertical septa), 4-celled, 15 to 20 by 12 to 16 μm. The basidiospores are globose, smooth, 7.5 to 8 μm in diameter.

== Similar species ==
Tremella globispora, originally described from England but reported worldwide, is macroscopically very similar but differs microscopically in having hyphae with clamp connections. Most other Tremella species also have clamped hyphae.

== Habitat and distribution ==
Tremella diaporthicola is a parasite on pyrenomycetous Diaporthe species on wood (Fraxinus (ash) in the original collection). It was described from Kentucky, but has also been reported from Ukraine on Diatrypella species on Quercus (oak).
