= Tremella wrightii =

Scientific classification
- Kingdom: Fungi
- Division: Basidiomycota
- Class: Tremellomycetes
- Order: Tremellales
- Family: Tremellaceae
- Genus: Tremella
- Species: T. wrightii

Binomial name
- Tremella wrightii Berk. & M.A.Curtis (1868)

Species of fungus

Tremella wrightii is a species of fungus in the family Tremellaceae. It produces light brown to orange-brown, lobed, gelatinous basidiocarps (fruit bodies) and is parasitic on other fungi on dead branches of broad-leaved trees. It was originally described from Cuba.

== Taxonomy ==
Tremella wrightii was first published in 1868 by British mycologist Miles Joseph Berkeley and American mycologist Moses Ashley Curtis based on a collection made in Cuba by the American botanist Charles Wright, after whom it was named.

== Description ==
Fruit bodies are firm, gelatinous, light brown to orange-brown, up to 5 cm (2 in) across, and lobed, often with inflated horn-like processes. Microscopically, the basidia are tremelloid (subglobose to ellipsoid, with oblique to vertical septa), 4-celled, 11 to 18 by 8 to 11 μm. The basidiospores are ellipsoid, smooth, 5.5 to 7.5 by 4 to 6 μm.

== Similar species ==
Tremella coffeicolor and Phaeotremella frondosa, also reported from the neotropics, are both brown and gelatinous, but with lobes that are more frondose, less inflated, and not or rarely horn-like. Tremella laurisilvae, described from the Canary Islands, is very similar but said to be distinct.

== Habitat and distribution ==
Tremella wightii is a parasite on lignicolous fungi, but its host species is unknown, though collections have been noted on pyrenomycetes. It is found on dead, attached or fallen branches of broad-leaved trees.

The species was described from Cuba and has been reported from Brazil Guyana, Trinidad, Panama, Belize, Cameroon, and Uganda.
