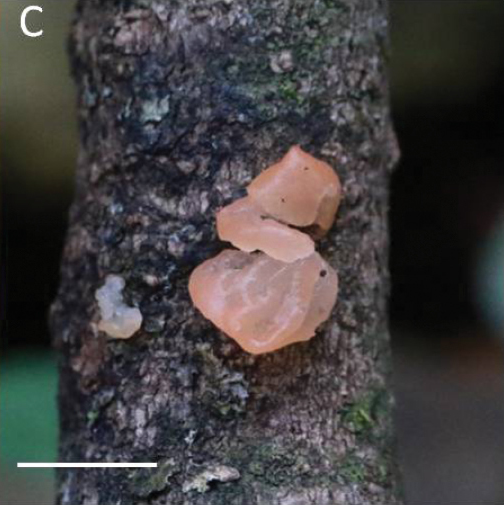

Scientific classification
- Kingdom: Fungi
- Division: Basidiomycota
- Class: Tremellomycetes
- Order: Tremellales
- Family: Tremellaceae
- Genus: Tremella
- Species: T. salmonea

Binomial name
- Tremella salmonea Xin Zhan Liu & F.Y. Bai (2019)

= Tremella salmonea =

Species of fungus

Tremella salmonea is a species of fungus in the family Tremellaceae. It produces pale orange to salmon, foliose, gelatinous basidiocarps (fruit bodies) and is parasitic on other fungi on wood of broad-leaved trees. It was originally described from China.

== Taxonomy ==
Tremella salmonea was first published in 2019 by Chinese mycologists Xin-Zhan Liu and Feng-Yan Bai based on collections made in Guangxi Province, China. The species is considered to be close to Tremella mesenterica, the type species of the genus, and hence belongs in Tremella sensu stricto.

== Description ==
Fruit bodies are gelatinous, salmon to pale orange, up to 10 mm across, and foliose. Microscopically, the basidia are tremelloid (globose to subglobose, with oblique to vertical septa), 4-celled, 31 to 38 by 29 to 37 μm. The basidiospores are globose to subglobose, smooth, 16 to 22 by 15 to 20 μm.

== Similar species ==
Tremella roseolutescens is similarly coloured, but was described from Costa Rica and has smaller basidia and basidiospores. Tremella rosea is also pink, but was described from Austria and has substantially smaller basidia and basidiospores.

== Habitat and distribution ==
Tremella salmonea is a parasite on lignicolous fungi, but its host is unknown. It was originally described from wood of a deciduous tree.

The species is currently only known from China.
