= Tremella roseolutescens =

Scientific classification
- Kingdom: Fungi
- Division: Basidiomycota
- Class: Tremellomycetes
- Order: Tremellales
- Family: Tremellaceae
- Genus: Tremella
- Species: T. roseolutescens

Binomial name
- Tremella roseolutescens Bandoni & J. Carranza (1996)

Species of fungus

Tremella roseolutescens is a species of fungus in the family Tremellaceae. It produces rose-pink to salmon, pustular, gelatinous basidiocarps (fruit bodies) and is parasitic on other fungi on dead attached branches of broad-leaved trees. It was originally described from Costa Rica.

== Taxonomy ==
Tremella roseolutescens was first published in 1996 by American mycologist Robert Bandoni and Costa Rican mycologist Julieta Carranza based on collections made in Costa Rica. The species is considered to be close to Tremella mesenterica, the type species of the genus, and hence belongs in Tremella sensu stricto.

== Description ==
Fruit bodies are gelatinous, rose-pink to salmon, up to 10 mm across, and pustular to cerebriform (brain-like). Microscopically, the basidia are tremelloid (globose to ellipsoid, with oblique to vertical septa), 4-celled, 20 to 27 by 18 to 27 μm. The basidiospores are globose to subglobose, smooth, 11 to 15 by 9 to 11.5 μm.

== Similar species ==
Tremella salmonea is similarly coloured, but was described from China and has larger basidia and basidiospores. Tremella rosea is also pink, but was described from Austria and has smaller basidia and basidiospores.

== Habitat and distribution ==
Tremella roseolutescens is a parasite on lignicolous fungi, but its host is unknown. It was originally described from dead, attached branches of an Inga species.

The species is currently known from Costa Rica and Belize.
