= Tremella armeniaca =

Scientific classification
- Kingdom: Fungi
- Division: Basidiomycota
- Class: Tremellomycetes
- Order: Tremellales
- Family: Tremellaceae
- Genus: Tremella
- Species: T. armeniaca

Binomial name
- Tremella armeniaca Bandoni & J. Carranza (1996)

Species of fungus

Tremella armeniaca is a species of fungus in the family Tremellaceae. It produces orange to apricot, lobed, gelatinous basidiocarps (fruit bodies) and is parasitic on other fungi (probably Xylaria species) on dead branches of broad-leaved trees. It was originally described from Costa Rica.

== Taxonomy ==
Tremella armeniaca was first published in 1996 by American mycologist Robert Bandoni and Costa Rican mycologist Julieta Carranza based on collections made in Costa Rica. The species is considered to be close to Tremella mesenterica, the type species of the genus, and hence belongs in Tremella sensu stricto.

== Description ==
Fruit bodies are gelatinous, orange to apricot, up to 12 mm across, and lobed, sometimes arising in small clusters. Microscopically, the basidia are tremelloid (ellipsoid, with oblique to vertical septa), 4-celled, 10 to 15 by 6 to 10 μm. The basidiospores are ellipsoid to oblong, smooth, 6 to 9 by 3 to 6 μm.

== Similar species ==
Tremella erythrina is similarly coloured, but was described from China and has larger basidia and basidiospores.

== Habitat and distribution ==
Tremella armeniaca is a parasite on lignicolous fungi, probably Xylaria species. It was originally described from fallen branches of Theobroma cacao (cocoa tree).

The species is currently known only from Costa Rica.
