= Tremella boraborensis =

Scientific classification
- Kingdom: Fungi
- Division: Basidiomycota
- Class: Tremellomycetes
- Order: Tremellales
- Family: Tremellaceae
- Genus: Tremella
- Species: T. boraborensis

Binomial name
- Tremella boraborensis L.S.Olive (1958)

Species of fungus

Tremella boraborensis is a species of fungus in the family Tremellaceae. It produces dark brown to black, lobed to brain-like, gelatinous basidiocarps (fruit bodies) and is parasitic on other fungi on dead branches of broad-leaved trees. It was originally described from the Society Islands and has also been recorded from Hawai'i.

== Taxonomy ==
Tremella boraborensis was first published in 1958 by the American mycologist Lindsay Shepherd Olive based on collections made in Tahiti and Bora Bora.

== Description ==
Fruit bodies are rubbery-gelatinous, dark brown to black, up to 6 cm (1.5 in) across, and irregularly lobed to cerebriform (brain-like). Microscopically, the basidia are tremelloid (ellipsoid, with oblique to vertical septa), 2 to 4-celled, 14.5 to 30 by 9 to 12.5 μm. The basidiospores are ellipsoid, smooth, 8 to 11 by 5 to 8 μm.

== Similar species ==
Tremella volcanagua, described from Guatemala, is similarly coloured (chocolate-brown to black) but has lobed fruit bodies and subglobose spores. Several species of Phaeotremella are also similarly coloured, but have foliaceous fruit bodies with thin, seaweed-like fronds.

== Habitat and distribution ==
Tremella boraborensis is a parasite on lignicolous fungi, but its host species is unknown. It was originally found on branches of the invasive Java plum (Syzygium cumini).

The species is currently known from the Society Islands and from Hawai'i.
