= Tremella brasiliensis =

Scientific classification
- Kingdom: Fungi
- Division: Basidiomycota
- Class: Tremellomycetes
- Order: Tremellales
- Family: Tremellaceae
- Genus: Tremella
- Species: T. brasiliensis

Binomial name
- Tremella brasiliensis (Möller) Lloyd (1922)

Synonyms
- Tremella lutescens var. brasiliensis Möller (1895)

Species of fungus

Tremella brasiliensis is a species of fungus in the family Tremellaceae. It produces yellow, lobed to firmly foliaceous, gelatinous basidiocarps (fruit bodies) and is parasitic on other fungi on dead branches of broad-leaved trees. It was originally described from Brazil.

== Taxonomy ==
Tremella brasiliensis was first published in 1895 by German mycologist Alfred Möller as a variety of the superficially similar European species Tremella lutescens (now regarded as a synonym of Tremella mesenterica). It was raised to species level by American mycologist Curtis Gates Lloyd in 1922.

== Description ==
Fruit bodies are gelatinous, whitish to yellow to bright orange-yellow, up to 3 cm (1.5 in) across, and lobed to frondose. Microscopically, the basidia are tremelloid (ellipsoid, with oblique to vertical septa), 4-celled, 25 to 45 by 12 to 30 μm. The basidiospores are globose, smooth, 14 to 20 μm across.

== Similar species ==
Tremella mesenterica, described from Europe but reported from South America, is similarly coloured but has smaller basidia and smaller, ellipsoid spores (10 to 16 by 6 to 9.5 μm). Naematelia aurantia, described from North America but reported from South America, is also bright yellow but is a parasite of Stereum fruit bodies (amongst which it typically occurs) and also has much smaller basidia and spores (5.5 to 9 by 4.5 to 7 μm).

Elsewhere, Tremella philippinensis is equally large-spored and was considered conspecific by Roberts & Spooner. It was originally described as a whitish species or possibly pale yellow, but its status is uncertain. Tremella grandibasidia, described from North America, is another large-spored, yellow species of uncertain status.

== Habitat and distribution ==
Tremella brasiliensis is a parasite on lignicolous fungi, but its host species is unknown. It is found on dead, attached or fallen branches of broad-leaved trees.

The species was described from Brazil and has also been reported from Panama and Costa Rica. Bandoni & Ginns considered that collections from Japan also represented Tremella brasiliensis. Roberts & Spooner treated the species as a synonym of Tremella philippinensis and recorded the latter from Brunei and Australia.
