= Tremella yokohamensis =

Scientific classification
- Kingdom: Fungi
- Division: Basidiomycota
- Class: Tremellomycetes
- Order: Tremellales
- Family: Tremellaceae
- Genus: Tremella
- Species: T. yokohamensis

Binomial name
- Tremella yokohamensis (Alshahni, Satoh & Makimura) Yurkov (2015)

Synonyms
- Cryptococcus yokohamensis Alshahni, Satoh & Makimura (2011)

Species of fungus

Tremella yokohamensis is a species of fungus in the family Tremellaceae. It produces white, foliaceous, gelatinous basidiocarps (fruit bodies) and is parasitic on other fungi on dead wood of broad-leaved trees. It was originally described from Japan.

== Taxonomy ==
Tremella yokohamensis was first published in 2011 as a yeast, Cryptococcus yokohamensis, isolated from Eucalyptus bark (and a koala) in a Japanese zoo. Molecular research, based on cladistic analysis of DNA sequences, showed that the yeast was closely related to the type species of Tremella and in 2015 the species was accordingly recombined as Tremella yokohamensis. Subsequently, a fruit body collected in the Russian Far East was found to have identical DNA, enabling a more complete description of the fungus.

== Description ==
Fruit bodies are gelatinous, white, up to 40 mmm across, and foliaceous. Microscopically, the basidia are tremelloid (ellipsoid, with oblique to vertical septa), 4-celled, stalked, 18 to 21 by 9.5 to 10.5 μm. The basidiospores are ellipsoid, smooth, 8 to 10.5 by 5.5 to 7 μm.

== Similar species ==
Fruit bodies of Tremella fuciformis are of similar shape and colour, but can be distinguished microscopically by having basidia that are unstalked and slightly smaller, producing smaller basidiospores (5 to 8 μm by 4 to 6 μm).

== Habitat and distribution ==
Tremella yokohamensis is a parasite on lignicolous fungi, but its host is unknown. It was originally isolated from the trunk of a Eucalyptus tree and subsequently found on decaying wood of a deciduous tree.

The species was originally isolated as a yeast in Japan and as a basidiocarp in the Russian Far East (Primorye Territory).
