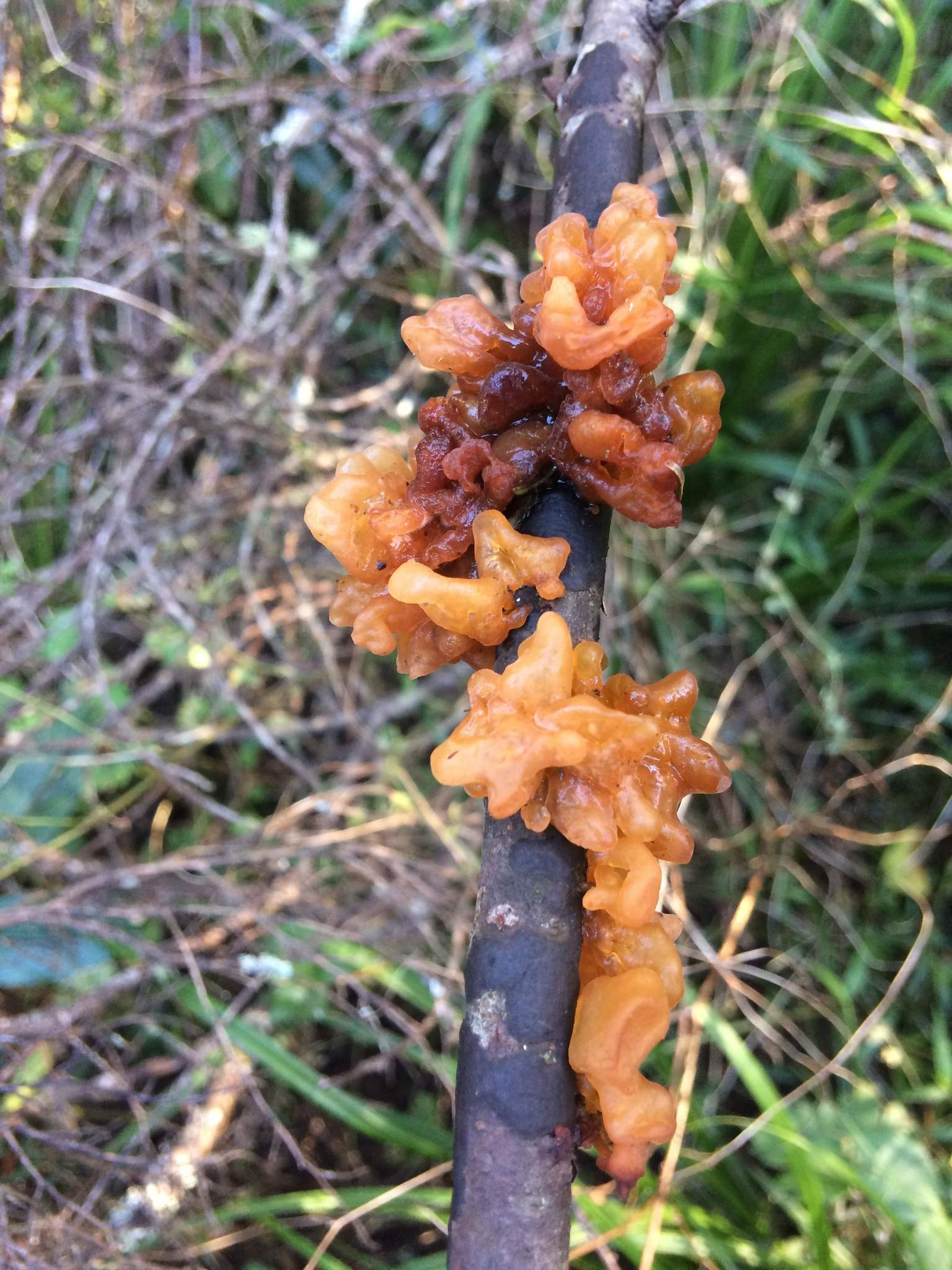

Scientific classification
- Kingdom: Fungi
- Division: Basidiomycota
- Class: Tremellomycetes
- Order: Tremellales
- Family: Tremellaceae
- Genus: Tremella
- Species: T. vesiculosa

Binomial name
- Tremella vesiculosa McNabb (1990)

= Tremella vesiculosa =

Species of fungus

Tremella vesiculosa is a species of fungus in the family Tremellaceae. It produces light brown, lobed, gelatinous basidiocarps (fruit bodies) and is parasitic on other fungi on dead branches of broad-leaved trees. It was originally described from New Zealand.

== Taxonomy ==
Tremella vesiculosa was first published in 1990 by Robert Bandoni and Peter Buchanan, based on collections and notes made by the late New Zealand mycologist R.F.R. McNabb.

== Description ==
Fruit bodies are firm, gelatinous, brick-red to reddish brown, up to 5 cm (2 in) across, and lobed, the lobes thick and inflated (vesiculose). Microscopically, the basidia are tremelloid (subglobose to broadly clavate, with oblique to vertical septa), 4-celled, 11.5 to 20 by 8 to 12.5 μm. The basidiospores are ellipsoid, smooth, 8 to 9 by 5.5 to 7 μm.

== Similar species ==
Phaeotremella species are both brown and gelatinous, but have lobes that are comparatively thin, uninflated, and frondose. Tremella laurisilvae, described from the Canary Islands, is similar but geographically distant.

== Habitat and distribution ==
Tremella vesiculosa is a parasite on lignicolous fungi, but its host species is unknown, though the original collections were associated with xylariaceous fungi. It is found on dead, attached or fallen branches of broad-leaved trees.

The species was described from New Zealand and has been reported from Australia.
