= Tremella exigua =

Scientific classification
- Kingdom: Fungi
- Division: Basidiomycota
- Class: Tremellomycetes
- Order: Tremellales
- Family: Tremellaceae
- Genus: Tremella
- Species: T. exigua

Binomial name
- Tremella exigua Desm. (1847)

Synonyms
- Agyrium atrovirens Fr. (1822); Tremella atrovirens (Fr.) Sacc. (1888) (nom. illegit.); Tremella genistae Lib. (1880)

Species of fungus

Tremella exigua is a species of fungus in the family Tremellaceae. It produces small, dark, pustular, gelatinous basidiocarps (fruit bodies) and is parasitic on pyrenomycetous fungi (Diaporthe and Cucurbitaria species) on dead branches of trees and shrubs. It was originally described from France.

== Taxonomy ==
Tremella exigua was first published in 1847 by French mycologist John Baptiste Desmazières based on a collection from France on a dead branch of ash (Fraxinus excelsior).

Swedish mycologist Elias Magnus Fries had earlier described Agyrium atrovirens, a species interpreted as synonymous with T. exigua, on the same host tree from Sweden. The name is not available in Tremella, however, since the combination Tremella atrovirens is an illegitimate homonym of the earlier, unrelated T. atrovirens Bull.

Tremella genistae, described from Belgium on broom (Cytisus scoparius), is considered a further synonym. The name Tremella virescens Schumach. has also been used for this species, but its interpretation is doubtful.

Initial molecular research, based on cladistic analysis of DNA sequences, suggests that Tremella exigua is not closely related to Tremella sensu stricto, but belongs in a separate (but as yet unnamed) genus in the family Bulleraceae.

== Description ==
Fruit bodies are gelatinous, olive-black, up to 8 mm across, pustular at first, sometimes becoming cerebriform (brain-like). Microscopically, the hyphae have clamp connections and the basidia are tremelloid (globose to clavate, with oblique septa), 4-celled, 18 to 36 by 8 to 15 μm. Basidiospores are globose to subglobose 7 to 10 by 6.5 to 10 μm in diameter.

== Similar species ==
Gelatinous fruit bodies of Tremella globispora and Tremella indecorata are of similar size and shape and have also been recorded as parasites of Diaporthe species, but are hyaline (colourless) or whitish to brown, without green or black tints. Species of Nostoc are greenish black and gelatinous, but are cyanobacteria (not fungi) and form growths that are typically more extensive and often terrestrial.

== Habitat and distribution ==
Tremella exigua is a parasite on lignicolous pyrenomycetes, including species of Diaporthe and Cucurbitaria. Though originally described from ash, the species is more commonly found on dead branches of gorse (Ulex europaeus), broom (Cytisus scoparius), and barberry (Berberis vulgaris).

The species was originally described from France and has been widely recorded in Europe. Tremella exigua has also been reported from Canada and Ecuador.
