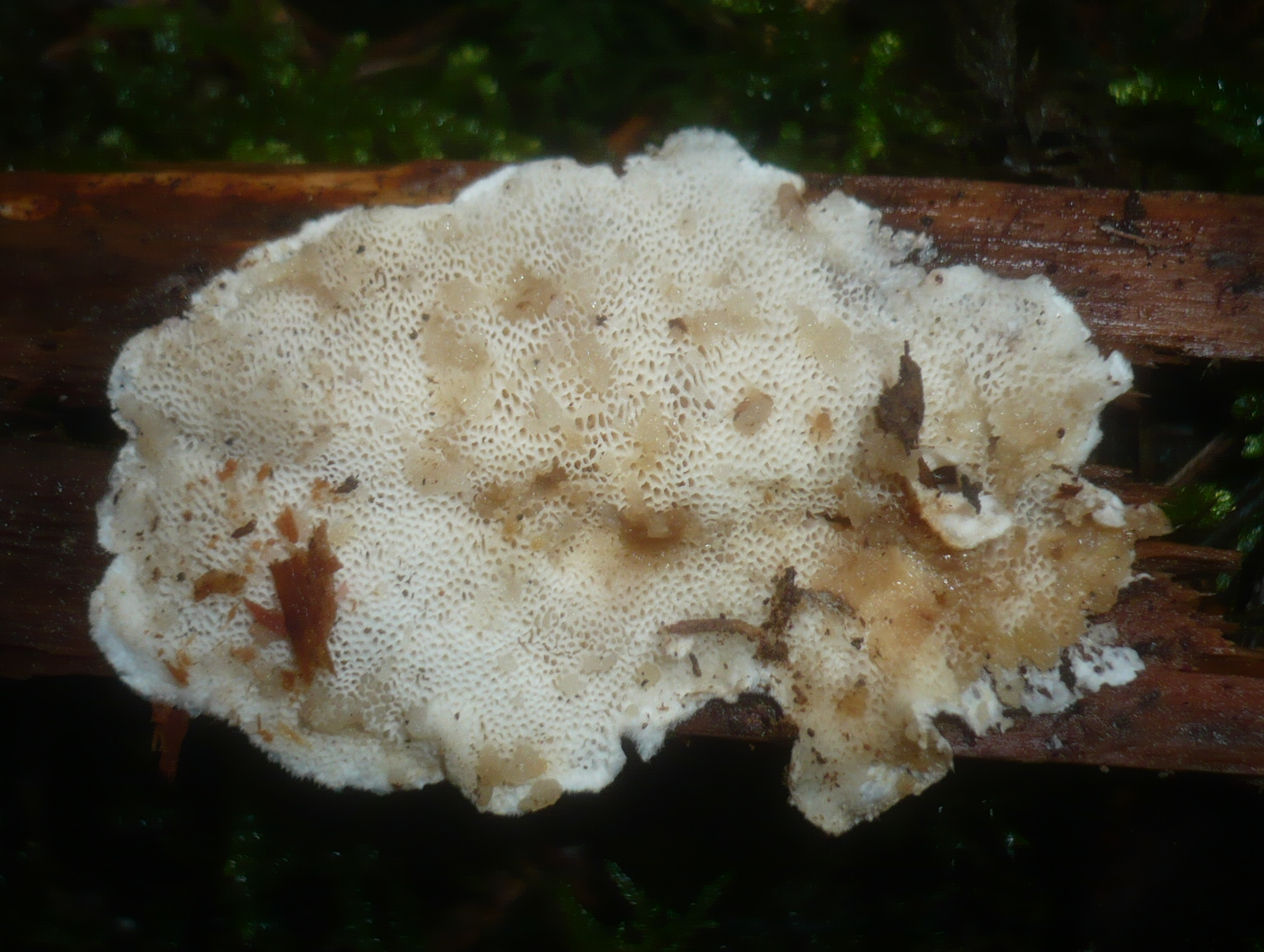
- Carcinomyces polyporinus parasitizing a poroid fruit body

Scientific classification
- Domain: Eukaryota
- Kingdom: Fungi
- Division: Basidiomycota
- Class: Tremellomycetes
- Order: Tremellales
- Family: Carcinomycetaceae
- Genus: Carcinomyces
- Species: C. polyporinus

Binomial name
- Carcinomyces polyporinus (D.A. Reid) Yurkov (2015)

Synonyms
- Tremella polyporina D.A. Reid (1970)

= Carcinomyces polyporinus =

Species of fungus

Carcinomyces polyporinus is a species of fungus in the class Tremellomycetes. It is a parasite, growing in the hymenia of various poroid fungi, particularly species of Postia. Microscopically, it resembles a species of Tremella, but DNA research indicates that it belongs in a different family, the Carcinomycetaceae. It was first described by British mycologist Derek Reid from Scotland. It has also been recorded in continental Europe and North America.
