= Tremella imshaugiae =

Scientific classification
- Kingdom: Fungi
- Division: Basidiomycota
- Class: Tremellomycetes
- Order: Tremellales
- Family: Tremellaceae
- Genus: Tremella
- Species: T. imshaugiae

Binomial name
- Tremella imshaugiae Diederich, Coppins, R.C.Harris, Millanes & Wedin (2020)

Species of fungus

Tremella imshaugiae, is a lichenicolous (lichen-dwelling) fungus that is parasitic on the lichen Imshaugia aleurites. It is a species of Basidiomycota belonging to the family Tremellaceae.

== Description ==
The fungus is typically found on the thallus of Imshaugia aleurites with an amber-colored fruiting bodies 0.1–1 mm in diameter. Like other fungi in the family Tremellaceae it has two to four celled septate basidia that average at 15.5–21.5 × 13–16.5 μm. Unlike others in the family Tremellaceae, it has somewhat spherical basidiospores averaging 6.5–9 × 6.5–8.5 μm. Its closest relative is Tremella diploschistina.

== Habitat and distribution ==
The species has been documented in four areas across the globe including Scotland, Spain, USA, and Canada. The first documented occurrence was in 2012 on the Great Wass Island Preserve in Maine, USA. The lichen is recorded within habitats that contain Imshaugia aleurites that include conifer forests, particularly pines and maples.
