= Tremella mesenterella =

Scientific classification
- Kingdom: Fungi
- Division: Basidiomycota
- Class: Tremellomycetes
- Order: Tremellales
- Family: Tremellaceae
- Genus: Tremella
- Species: T. mesenterella

Binomial name
- Tremella mesenterella Bandoni & Ginns (1999)

Species of fungus

Tremella mesenterella is a species of fungus in the family Tremellaceae. It produces yellowish to reddish brown, foliose, gelatinous basidiocarps (fruit bodies) and is parasitic on corticioid fungi (Peniophora species) on dead branches of broadleaf trees and shrubs. It was originally described from Canada.

== Taxonomy ==
Tremella mesenterella was first published in 1999 by American mycologist Robert Joseph Bandoni and Canadian mycologist James Ginns based on collections from Canada and the United States on broadleaf trees.

== Description ==
Fruit bodies are gelatinous, buff to ochre-yellow or pale reddish brown, up to 50 mm across, foliose to cerebriform (brain-like). Microscopically, the hyphae have clamp connections and the basidia are tremelloid (globose to subglobose, with vertical septa), 4-celled, 20 to 30 by 18 to 24 μm. Basidiospores are subglobose 12 to 15 by 10 to 12 μm.

== Similar species ==
In North America, fruit bodies of the common and widespread species Tremella mesenterica are similar in appearance but typically bright golden yellow and can be distinguished microscopically by their differently shaped, ellipsoid spores measuring 10 to 16 by 6 to 9.5 μm. Fruit bodies of Naematelia aurantia are also golden yellow, but are parasitic on fruit bodies of Stereum species.

== Habitat and distribution ==
Tremella mesenterella is a parasite on species of the corticioid genus Peniophora. Collections have typically been made on dead attached branches of Cornus (dogwood) and Salix (willow) species, less commonly on other broadleaf trees.

The type collection was from western Canada, but additional collections were made from southeastern USA. It is possible these represent two closely related but separate species.
