= Tremella coffeicolor =

Scientific classification
- Kingdom: Fungi
- Division: Basidiomycota
- Class: Tremellomycetes
- Order: Tremellales
- Family: Tremellaceae
- Genus: Tremella
- Species: T. coffeicolor

Binomial name
- Tremella coffeicolor (Berk.) P. Roberts (2004)

Synonyms
- Hirneola coffeicolor Berk. (1876); Auricularia coffeicolor (Berk.) Farl. (1905); Tremella auricularia Möller (1895)

Species of fungus

Tremella coffeicolor is a species of fungus in the family Tremellaceae. It produces brown, lobed to foliaceous, gelatinous basidiocarps (fruit bodies) and is parasitic on other fungi on dead branches of broad-leaved trees. It was originally described from Bermuda, where it was collected as part of the Challenger expedition.

== Taxonomy ==
Tremella coffeicolor was first published, as Hirneola coffeicolor, in 1876 by British mycologist Miles Joseph Berkeley based on a collection made in Bermuda. In 2004, British mycologist Peter Roberts re-examined the type specimen and transferred the species to the genus Tremella. Roberts considered Tremella auricularia, described from Brazil in 1895, to be a later synonym.

== Description ==
Fruit bodies are gelatinous, pale to mid-brown, several centimetres across, and lobed to foliaceous, the lobes sometimes ear-like. Microscopically, the basidia are tremelloid (ellipsoid, with oblique to vertical septa), 4-celled, 18 to 26 by 12 to 17 μm. The basidiospores are ellipsoid to oblong, smooth, 10 to 12.5 by 8 to 9 μm.

== Similar species ==
Fruit bodies of Phaeotremella frondosa and P. foliacea are similarly coloured, but are typically more frondose and, microscopically, have smaller basidia and basidiospores.

== Habitat and distribution ==
Tremella coffeicolor is a parasite on lignicolous fungi, but its host is unknown. It was originally described from bark of Coffea.

The species was originally collected in Bermuda and has been recorded from the Azores, Cuba, Trinidad, Jamaica, Puerto Rico, and (as Tremella auricularia) from Brazil.
