= Tremella normandinae =

Scientific classification
- Kingdom: Fungi
- Division: Basidiomycota
- Class: Tremellomycetes
- Order: Tremellales
- Family: Tremellaceae
- Genus: Tremella
- Species: T. normandinae

Binomial name
- Tremella normandinae Diederich (1996)

Species of lichen

Tremella normandinae is a species of lichenicolous (lichen-dwelling) fungus in the family Tremellaceae. The species was described as new to science based on material collected in Hawaii. The holotype specimen is preserved in the Botanische Staatssammlung München (herbarium code M) under accession number M 4837. The only known collection comes from the lichen Normandina pulchella growing on dead Acacia koa trees in sunny exposures in Hawaii. Infection by the fungus results in the formation of pale galls on the host lichen.
