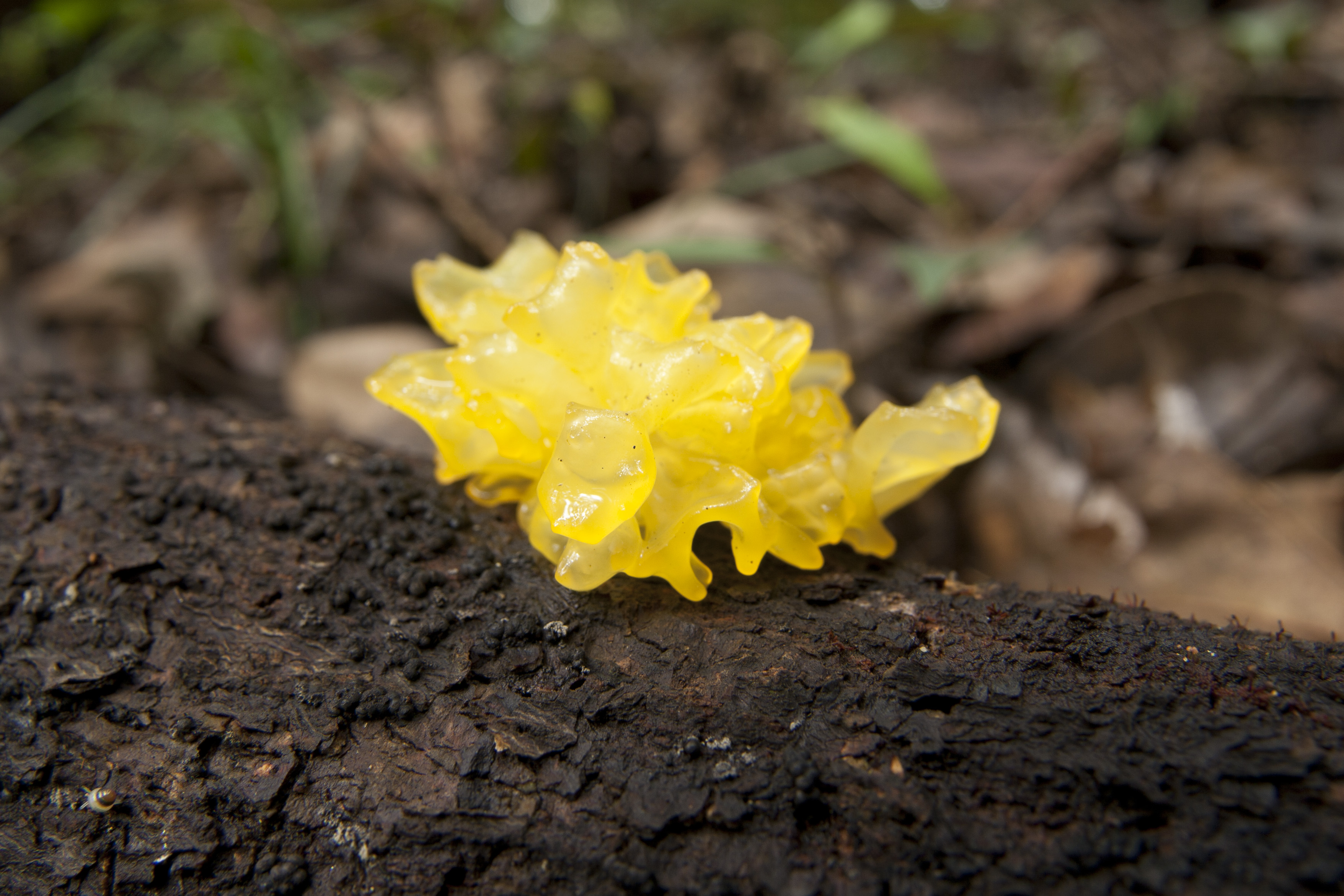

Scientific classification
- Kingdom: Fungi
- Division: Basidiomycota
- Class: Tremellomycetes
- Order: Tremellales
- Family: Tremellaceae
- Genus: Tremella
- Species: T. iduensis

Binomial name
- Tremella iduensis Kobayasi (1939)

= Tremella iduensis =

Species of fungus

Tremella iduensis is a species of fungus in the family Tremellaceae. It produces yellow, cornute-frondose, gelatinous basidiocarps (fruit bodies) and is parasitic on other fungi, probably species of Hypoxylon on dead attached and recently fallen branches of broad-leaved trees. It has been recorded from Japan and China. Tremella flava, described from Taiwan, may be a synonym.

== Taxonomy ==
Tremella iduensis was first published in 1939 by Japanese mycologist Yosio Kobayasi.

== Description ==
Fruit bodies are gelatinous, bright yellow, up to 2.5 cm (1 in) across, and branched, with cornute (horn-like) fronds. Microscopically, the basidia are tremelloid (ellipsoid, with oblique to vertical septa), 4-celled, 17 to 18 by 12 to 13 μm. The basidiospores are ovoid to ellipsoid, smooth, 8.5 to 9.5 by 7.5 to 8.5 μm.

== Similar species ==
Tremella flava was described from Taiwan as "resembling T. iduensis" but differing in the size of its basidiospores (7 to 9 by 5 to 6.5 μm) and basidia. It has been suggested it may be a later synonym of T. iduensis. Other yellow Tremella species are lobed or foliaceous and lack horn-like fronds.

== Habitat and distribution ==
Tremella iduensis is a parasite on lignicolous fungi, probably species of Hypoxylon. It was originally described from Castanopsis sieboldii and is found on dead, attached or recently fallen branches of broad-leaved trees.

The species is currently known from Japan and China.
