= Tremella tremelloides =

Scientific classification
- Domain: Eukaryota
- Kingdom: Fungi
- Division: Basidiomycota
- Class: Tremellomycetes
- Order: Tremellales
- Family: Tremellaceae
- Genus: Tremella
- Species: T. tremelloides

Binomial name
- Tremella tremelloides (Berk.) Massee (1889)

Synonyms
- Sparassis tremelloides Berk. (1873)

Species of fungus

Tremella tremelloides is a species of fungus in the order Tremellales. It produces yellowish, brain-like to densely lobed, gelatinous basidiocarps (fruit bodies) and is parasitic on Stereum basidiocarps on dead branches of broadleaved trees. It was originally described from the USA.

== Taxonomy ==
The species was first published in 1873 by British mycologist Miles Joseph Berkeley who placed it in the genus Sparassis, interpreting the lobes as compacted branches. It was subsequently transferred to Tremella by George Edward Massee in 1889. American mycologist Robert Joseph Bandoni restudied collections in 1961, placing Naematelia quercina in synonymy and noting a similarity between Tremella tremelloides on broadleaf trees and Naematelia encephala on conifers. As a parasite of Stereum fruit bodies, Tremella tremelloides belongs in the genus Naematelia, but the species has not as yet undergone DNA sequencing to confirm this.

== Description ==
Fruit bodies are gelatinous, hemispherical at first becoming lobed, the lobes often flattened and compact, yellowish, with a denser whitish core when sectioned. Microscopically, the hyphae have clamp connections. The basidia are tremelloid (globose to subglobose, with oblique to vertical septa) and unstalked, 4-celled, 14 to 22 by 12 to 18 μm. The basidiospores are subglobose, smooth, 9 to 12 by 9 to 11 μm.

== Similar species ==
Naematelia aurantia occurs on Stereum hirsutum on broadleaved trees and is macroscopically similar, though typically larger and more brightly coloured. It can be distinguished microscopically by having stalked, ellipsoid to clavate (club-shaped) basidia. Naematelia encephala is very similar but is typically pinkish and occurs as a parasite of Stereum sanguinolentum on conifers.

== Habitat and distribution ==
Tremella tremelloides is a parasite on fruit bodies of Stereum species on broadleaved trees. The type collection was on oak (Quercus species) and at least some records are from Stereum complicatum. It was described from South Carolina, but has also been reported from Iowa, Louisiana, North Carolina, Tennessee, and Texas.
