= Tremella anaptychiae =

Scientific classification
- Kingdom: Fungi
- Division: Basidiomycota
- Class: Tremellomycetes
- Order: Tremellales
- Family: Tremellaceae
- Genus: Tremella
- Species: T. anaptychiae

Binomial name
- Tremella anaptychiae J.C.Zamora & Diederich (2017)

Species of lichen

Tremella anaptychiae is a species of lichenicolous (lichen-dwelling) fungus in the family Tremellaceae. It was first reported in the literature in 1996 by the mycologist Paul Diederich, who did not formally describe it as a new species due to the paucity of material. Additional material was collected in later years, and it was finally described in 2017 by Juan Carlos Zamora and Diederich. The fungus is known to occur in Italy, Macedonia, Spain (including the Canary Islands), and Sweden. It is confined to the host lichen Anaptychia ciliaris, which has a largely palearctic distribution.

== Description ==
Tremella anaptychiae produces basidiomata that are typically more or less spherical in shape, becoming slightly tuberculate as they age. These are characterized by a waxy-gelatinous texture and can exhibit a variety of colours, ranging from cream to pinkish, brownish, or even blackish, with rare instances of greenish shades. Typically measuring 0.2–2 mm in diameter, they grow on the thallus of their host, often encompassing the cilia and, less frequently, on the margin of apothecia.

The internal context hyphae and the hyphae below the basidia are slender and thick-walled, typically ranging from 3–5.5 μm in diameter. These hyphae do not have clamps but may sometimes show small spur-like swellings. Abundant haustorial branches are present, with the mother cell being roughly spherical to broadly ellipsoid. The hymenium is well-developed, either clear or subtly brownish, and contains numerous probasidia. The basidia, when mature, are two-celled, stalked, and thick-walled, often displaying longitudinal or oblique septa. They produce basidiospores that are somewhat spherical, sometimes broadly ellipsoid, and germinate to form ballistoconidia and blastic conidia.

Additionally, Tremella anaptychiae may sometimes produce asteroconidia, which have a unique four-armed structure. These asteroconidia are about 10–15 μm in diameter, with individual arms ranging from 3.5–8 μm in length. In some basidiomata, where basidia are sparse, these conidiogenous cells can be particularly numerous.
