= Tremella compacta =

Scientific classification
- Domain: Eukaryota
- Kingdom: Fungi
- Division: Basidiomycota
- Class: Tremellomycetes
- Order: Tremellales
- Family: Tremellaceae
- Genus: Tremella
- Species: T. compacta

Binomial name
- Tremella compacta Möller (1895)

Species of fungus

Tremella compacta is a species of fungus in the order Tremellales. It produces large, ochraceous yellow, compactly lobed, cartilaginous-gelatinous basidiocarps (fruit bodies) on dead branches of broadleaved trees. It was originally described from Brazil and is distributed in northern South America, Central America, and the Caribbean.

== Taxonomy ==
The species was first published in 1895 by German mycologist Alfred Möller based on a collection from Blumenau. As a probable parasite of Stereum fruit bodies, Tremella compacta belongs in the genus Naematelia, but the species has not as yet undergone DNA sequencing to confirm this.

== Description ==
Fruit bodies are tough-gelatinous, compactly lobed to cerebriform (brain-like), 35 to 60 mm across, the lobes hollow, ochraceous to apricot or pale orange-brown when fresh, drying hard and rigid. Microscopically, the hyphae have clamp connections. The basidia are tremelloid (ellipsoid, with oblique to vertical septa) and normally stalked, 2 to 4-celled, 10 to 16 by 7.5 to 14 μm. The basidiospores are ellipsoid, smooth, 7 to 9.5 by 5 to 6.5 μm.

== Similar species ==
Naematelia aurantia occurs on Stereum hirsutum on broadleaved trees but typically has more leaf-like lobes and is bright yellow to yellow-orange.

== Habitat and distribution ==
Tremella compacta occurs on broadleaved trees and appears to be a parasite on fruit bodies of Stereum species. The type collection was from Brazil, but it has also been reported from Belize, the Dominican Republic, Trinidad, Puerto Rico, Colombia, and Venezuela.
