= Tremella tubulosae =

Scientific classification
- Kingdom: Fungi
- Division: Basidiomycota
- Class: Tremellomycetes
- Order: Tremellales
- Family: Tremellaceae
- Genus: Tremella
- Species: T. tubulosae

Binomial name
- Tremella tubulosae Diederich, Coppins, J.C.Zamora, Millanes & Wedin (2020)

Species of fungus

Tremella tubulosae is a lichenicolous fungus on Hypogymnia tubulosa. Tremella tubulosae was described as new in 2020 and has been recorded in Scotland and Spain. It forms pale to dark brown or blackish galls on its host.

== Description ==
Tremella tubulosae affects Hypogymnia tubulosa by inducing distinct, convex galls on the thallus. The galls darken as they mature, going from pale brown when young, to dark brown or blackish when old.

== Habitat and geography ==
As of 2020, Tremella tubulosae has been recorded in Scotland and Spain. In Spain, it has been recorded along roadsides in the Castilla y León and Segovia area. This region is a high plateau ringed by mountains, and described as having a continental Mediterranean climate. In Scotland, the lichenicolous fungus has been recorded in Moray, in the Culbin Forest. This coastal region has a warm summer climate, with annual temperatures slightly lower than average for the U.K., and rainy days for roughly 35% of the year.

== Etymology ==
The specific epithet tubulosae refers to the host lichen and is derived from the Latin tubulosus meaning tube or pipe shaped.
