= Tremella cetrariellae =

Scientific classification
- Kingdom: Fungi
- Division: Basidiomycota
- Class: Tremellomycetes
- Order: Tremellales
- Family: Tremellaceae
- Genus: Tremella
- Species: T. cetrariellae

Binomial name
- Tremella cetrariellae Millanes, Diederich, M.Westb., Pippola & Wedin (2015)
- Type locality: Sør Varanger, Norway

Species of fungus

Tremella cetrariellae is a lichenicolous fungus (a fungus that lives on lichens) in the family Tremellaceae. It is a parasitic fungus that grows exclusively on a ground-dwelling Arctic and alpine lichen called Cetrariella delisei, creating small brown or blackish swellings on the lichen's surface. The fungus was formally described in 2015 when researchers used DNA analysis to distinguish it from a closely related species, revealing that what had previously been treated as a single taxon actually comprised two distinct but morphologically similar species. Its distribution is restricted to high-latitude regions of the Arctic and subarctic, including Greenland, Scandinavia, and northern Russia.

== Taxonomy ==
Tremella cetrariellae is in the jelly-fungus order Tremellales (Basidiomycota), in the family Tremellaceae. It was described as a new species in 2015 from material growing parasitically on the lichen Cetrariella delisei. Earlier collections from this host were treated as Tremella cetrariicola, but later work separated two sister species within what had been called T. cetrariicola. The two species differ in gall shape, microscopic features (including basidia and basidiospores), and host preference. The new epithet refers to its host genus (Cetrariella).

The split was supported by DNA sequence data from the nuclear ribosomal ITS and nLSU regions, as well as by morphology: eight sequenced specimens from Cetrariella delisei formed a strongly supported genetic group (a clade), closest to T. cetrariicola in the strict sense. In the same analyses, T. cetrariellae fell within a monophyletic group of Tremella species associated with the lichen family Parmeliaceae. Although the T. cetrariellae samples formed two well-supported genetic lineages, they could not be separated using morphology or ecology, so they were treated as a single species.

== Description ==
Tremella cetrariellae forms superficial, waxy, jelly-like basidiomata (fruiting bodies) that cause gall-like swellings on the host lichen's thallus (body). The galls are pale to dark brown or black; they start out smoothly convex to nearly spherical and usually become tuberculate (covered with small bumps) as they mature. They measure about 0.1–1.5 mm across and only rarely show a central depression. Compared with its close relative T. cetrariicola, the mature galls in T. cetrariellae are predominantly tuberculate at maturity, whereas a central depression is often present in many galls of T. cetrariicola.

Microscopically, its tissue consists of hyphae (filaments) 1.5–4.0 μm wide, often with clamp connections, and it produces frequent haustorial branches (specialized contact structures in parasitic fungi). The spore-producing layer (the hymenium) contains many probasidia (immature basidia). Mature basidia are 2–4-celled, with septa that may be transverse, longitudinal, or oblique. Transversely septate basidia measure 10–33 × 4–11 μm (including the stalk-like base but excluding epibasidia), whilst longitudinally or obliquely septate basidia are 8–13 × 11–18 μm with somewhat cylindrical epibasidia up to 28 μm long. Basidiospores are ellipsoid to roughly spherical, typically 4–8 × 4–8 μm (or occasionally 3–4 × 3–4 μm), and bear a distinct apiculus (spore attachment spot) about 1 μm wide. Chain-forming conidia (asexual spores) were also reported developing within the basidioma.

== Habitat and distribution ==
Tremella cetrariellae is known only from the thallus of Cetrariella delisei, where it produces gall-like deformations that contain the fungal tissues and its spore-producing tissue. The two sister species also differ in host and habitat. Cetrariella delisei is arctoalpine and epigeic (ground-growing), whereas T. cetrariicola is confined to epiphytic Tuckermannopsis species (growing on plants, such as bark and twigs). Cetrariella delisei contains gyrophoric and hiascic acids (lichen substances), which were reported as absent in Tuckermannopsis; host chemistry was suggested as one factor that may influence host selection in lichenicolous fungi.

The species has been reported from high-latitude sites in Finland, Greenland, Norway, Russia, Svalbard, and Sweden. The holotype was collected in Finnmark (northern Norway), in a coastal setting with siliceous rocks and dwarf-shrub vegetation (including Empetrum and Betula nana) at 21 m above sea level, and additional material was examined from northern Fennoscandia, Svalbard, Greenland (including the Disko Bay area), and the Khibiny Mountains in Murmansk Oblast (NW Russia).
