= Neotremella =

Scientific classification
- Kingdom: Fungi
- Division: Basidiomycota
- Class: Tremellomycetes
- Order: Tremellales
- Family: Tremellaceae
- Genus: Neotremella; Lowy

Type species
- Neotremella guzmanii Lowy

Genus of fungi

Neotremella is a genus of fungi in the family Tremellaceae. The genus is monotypic, containing the single species Neotremella guzmanii, found in Mexico.
