= Sirotrema =

Scientific classification
- Kingdom: Fungi
- Division: Basidiomycota
- Class: Tremellomycetes
- Order: Tremellales
- Family: Tremellaceae
- Genus: Sirotrema; Bandoni

Type species
- Sirotrema pusilla Bandoni

Species
- S. parvula S. pusilla S. translucens

Genus of fungi

Sirotrema is a genus of fungi in the family Tremellaceae. The genus has a widespread distribution in north temperate regions, and contains three species.
