= Cuniculitremaceae =

Scientific classification
- Kingdom: Fungi
- Division: Basidiomycota
- Class: Tremellomycetes
- Order: Tremellales
- Family: Cuniculitremaceae; J.P.Samp., R.Kirschner & M.Weiss (2001)

Genera
- Fellomyces; Kockovaella; Sterigmatosporidium

Family of fungi

The Cuniculitremaceae are a family of fungi in the order Tremellales. There are three genera in the family. Sterigmatosporidium polymorphum parasitizes other fungi growing in insect galleries in wood. It does not produce basidiocarps (fruit bodies), but has septate basidia similar to those found in the genus Tremella. Most species are known only from their yeast states.
