= Phaeotremella translucens =

Scientific classification
- Kingdom: Fungi
- Division: Basidiomycota
- Class: Tremellomycetes
- Order: Tremellales
- Family: Phaeotremellaceae
- Genus: Phaeotremella
- Species: P. translucens

Binomial name
- Phaeotremella translucens (H.D. Gordon) M. Yamada, Endoh & Degawa (2022)

Synonyms
- Tremella translucens H.D. Gordon (1938); Pseudostypella translucens (H.D. Gordon) D.A. Reid & Minter (1979); Sirotrema translucens (H.D. Gordon) Bandoni (1986)

Species of fungus

Phaeotremella translucens is a species of fungus in the family Phaeotremellaceae. It produces small, pustular, gelatinous basidiocarps (fruit bodies) and is parasitic on ascocarps of Lophodermium species on decaying pine needles. It was originally described from Scotland.

== Taxonomy ==
Tremella translucens was first published in 1938 by mycologist Hugh Douglas Gordon based on collections from Scotland on decaying pine needles. British mycologist David Minter recollected specimens in Scotland in the 1970s and established that Tremella translucens was associated with ascocarps of Lophodermium species, transferring the species to the genus Pseudostypella based on morphological characters. American mycologist Robert Joseph Bandoni later transferred the species to his new genus Sirotrema. Molecular research, based on cladistic analysis of DNA sequences, has however shown that Tremella translucens belongs in the genus Phaeotremella.

== Description ==
Fruit bodies are gelatinous, hyaline (colourless) to greyish, up to 2 mm across, pustular, emerging from ascocarps of their host. Microscopically, the hyphae are clamped and occur in a gelatinous matrix. Haustorial cells arise on the hyphae, producing filaments that attach to and penetrate the hyphae of the host. The basidia are tremelloid (globose to ellipsoid, with oblique to vertical septa), 10 to 13 by 9 to 10 μm, usually unstalked. The basidiospores are oblong, smooth, 7 to 11 by 3 to 5.5 μm, and germinate by hyphal tube or by yeast cells.

== Habitat and distribution ==
Phaeotremella translucens is a parasite of Lophodermium species growing on decaying pine needles, typically those still attached to brash or branches.

The species was originally described from the United Kingdom, but has also been recorded in Europe from Austria, Bosnia, Ireland, Norway, Poland, Russia, and Spain. Elsewhere it has been recorded from Canada, New Zealand, and Japan.
