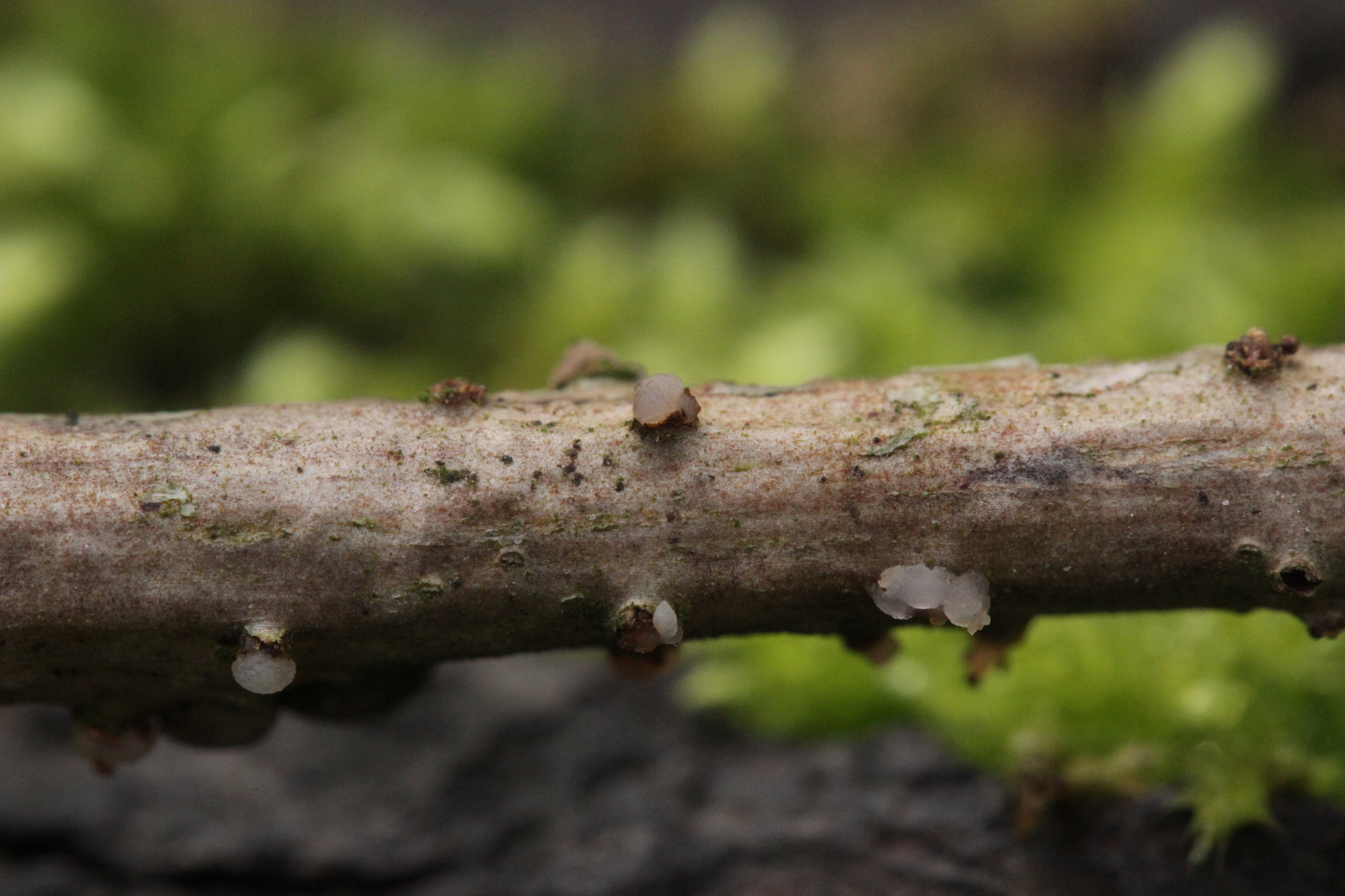

Scientific classification
- Kingdom: Fungi
- Division: Basidiomycota
- Class: Tremellomycetes
- Order: Tremellales
- Family: Tremellaceae
- Genus: Tremella
- Species: T. globispora

Binomial name
- Tremella globispora Reid (1970)

= Tremella globispora =

Species of fungus

Tremella globispora is a species of fungus in the family Tremellaceae. It produces hyaline, pustular, gelatinous basidiocarps (fruit bodies) and is parasitic on pyrenomycetous fungi (Diaporthe species) on dead herbaceous stems and wood. It was originally described from England.

== Taxonomy ==
The species was formerly referred to Tremella tubercularia, a nomen novum proposed by Miles Joseph Berkeley when transferring his earlier Tubercularia albida to the genus Tremella (to avoid creating a homonym of Tremella albida Huds.). In 1970, examination of Berkeley's original collections by English mycologist Derek Reid showed, however, that Tremella tubercularia is a gelatinous ascomycete, now known as Ascocoryne albida. Reid therefore described Tremella globispora (as "T. globospora") to accommodate the genuine Tremella species that had previously and mistakenly been referred to T. tubercularia. The type collection from Sussex was on perithecia of Diaporthe eres on dead canes of bramble (Rubus fruticosus).

== Description ==
Fruit bodies are gelatinous, hyaline, pustular, up to 0.5 cm across, but sometimes becoming larger (up to 1 cm across) through confluence. They emerge from the perithecia of their host. Microscopically, the basidia are tremelloid (ellipsoid, with oblique septa), 4-celled, 10 to 18 by 9 to 13 μm. The basidiospores are subglobose, smooth, 6 to 8 by 6 to 7 μm.

== Similar species ==
In Europe, Tremella indecorata, described from Norway, is morphologically very similar, though fruit bodies are said to darken when drying. The type collection was associated with pyrenomycetes (Nitschkia grevillei and a species of Valsaceae) on willow and said to have a spore range of 6.5 to 7.5 μm or 9.5 to 12 by 8.5 to 11 μm. It is not clear if the two species are distinct, though Scandinavian collections identified as T. indecorata are grey to date brown when mature and have larger spores (8.5 to 15 by 8 to 12.5 μm). Tremella karstenii is a similar species parasitic on Colpoma juniperi on juniper. Tremella colpomaticola parasitizes Colpoma quercinum on oak. Tremella subalpina was recently described from rhododendron in Russia.

Outside Europe, Chen considered North American collections as "closely related" to but possibly not conspecific with Tremella globispora. Chen also considered Tremella bambusina, described from the Philippines, as a probable synonym, differing only in its brownish orange colour.

== Habitat and distribution ==
Tremella globispora is a parasite on Diaporthe species and possibly other ascomycetous hosts. It is found on dead, attached or fallen wood and on dead herbaceous stems.

The species was described from England and has been widely reported in Europe. The species has also been reported from Canada and the USA (on Valsa and Diaporthe species) and from the Russian Far East.
