= Dictyotremella =

Scientific classification
- Kingdom: Fungi
- Division: Basidiomycota
- Class: Tremellomycetes
- Order: Tremellales
- Family: Tremellaceae
- Genus: Dictyotremella; Kobayasi

Type species
- Dictyotremella novoguineensis Kobayasi

Genus of fungi

Dictyotremella is a genus of fungi in the family Tremellaceae. The genus is monotypic, containing the single species Dictyotremella novoguineensis, found in Papua New Guinea.
