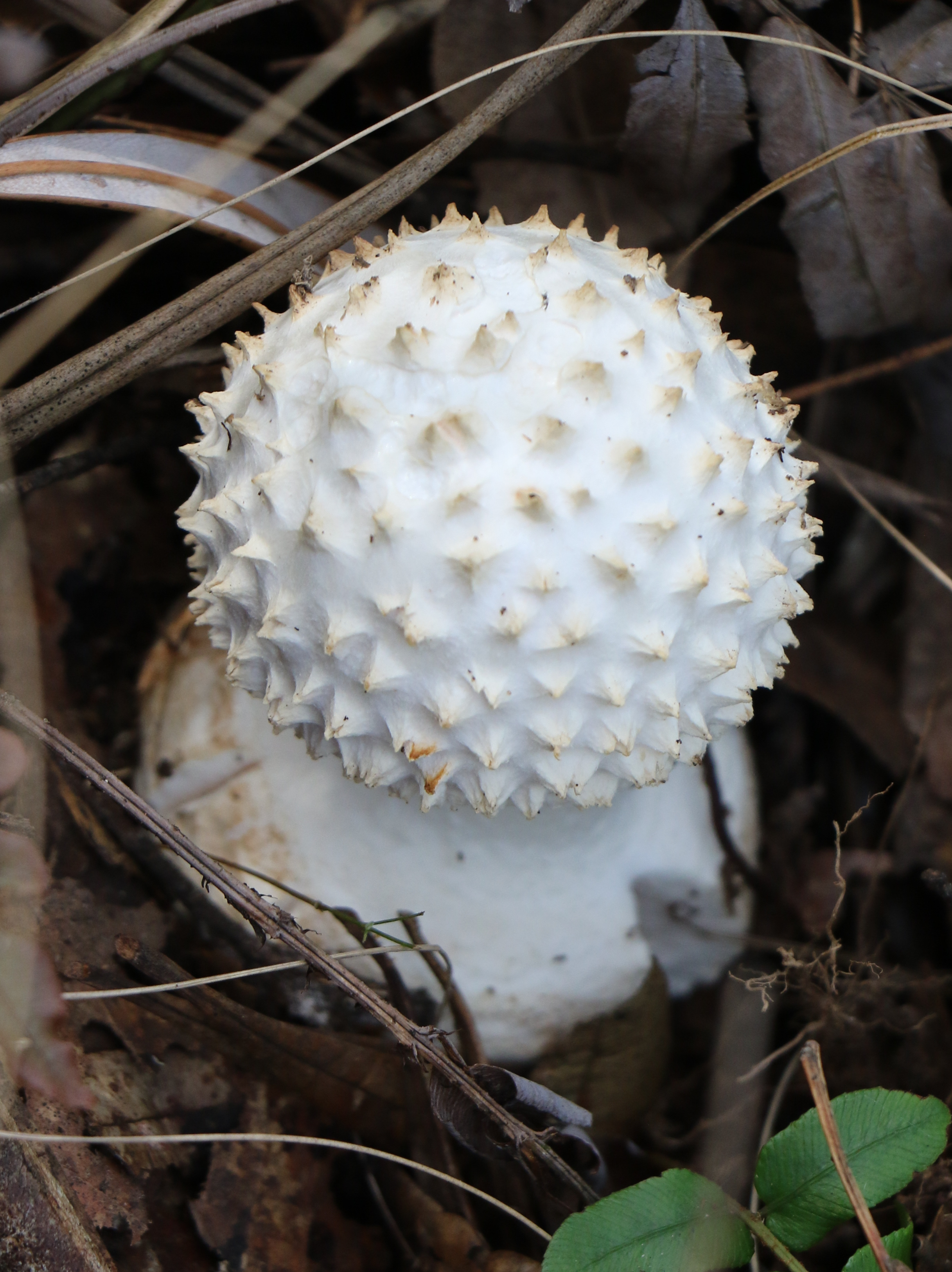
- Barrington Tops National Park, Australia

Scientific classification
- Domain: Eukaryota
- Kingdom: Fungi
- Division: Basidiomycota
- Class: Agaricomycetes
- Order: Agaricales
- Family: Amanitaceae
- Genus: Amanita
- Species: A. pyramidifera

Binomial name
- Amanita pyramidifera D.A.Reid

= Amanita pyramidifera =

Species of fungus

Amanita pyramidifera Mycological characteristics
- Gills on hymenium
- Cap is convex
- Hymenium is free
- Stipe is bare
- Spore print is white
- Ecology is mycorrhizal
- Edibility is inedible

Amanita pyramidifera is a basidiomycete mushroom of the genus Amanita. The cap is 8 to 21 centimetres (3 to 8 1/2 inches) in diameter, covered in pyramid type scales which may be white or greyish brown. The stem is 5 to 9 cm (2 to 3 1/2 in) long, white with pyramidal scales.

Found in eastern Australia, the species grows in moist sites associated with eucalyptus forest or rainforest.
