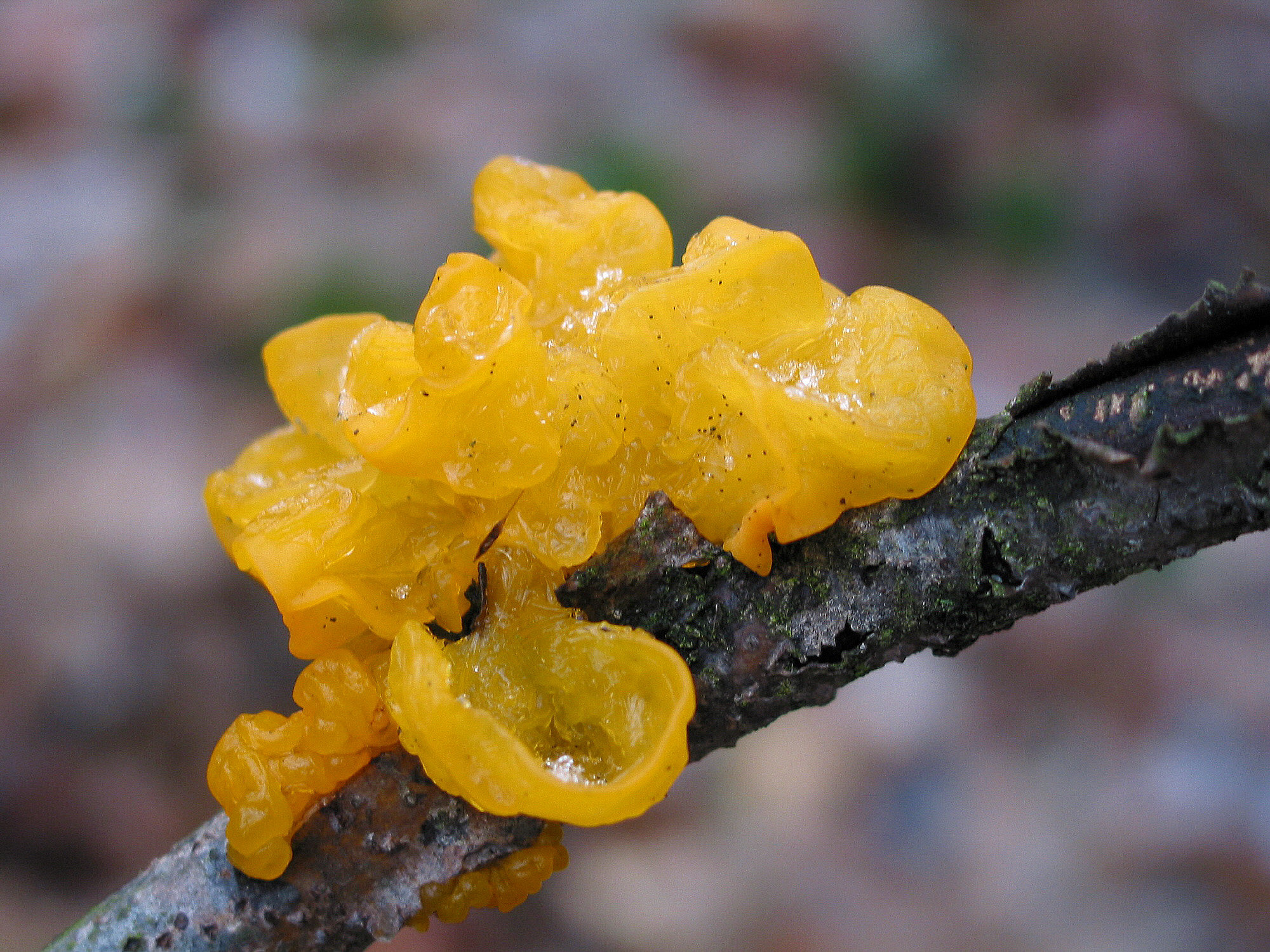
- Gelatinous fruit body of Tremella mesenterica

Scientific classification
- Kingdom: Fungi
- Division: Basidiomycota
- Class: Tremellomycetes
- Order: Tremellales
- Family: Tremellaceae
- Genus: Tremella; Pers. (1801)

Type species
- Tremella mesenterica (Schaeff.) Retz.

Synonyms
- Epidochium Fr. Gyraria Nees; Nakaiomyces Kobayasi

= Tremella =

Genus of fungi

Tremella is a genus of fungi in the family Tremellaceae. All Tremella species are parasites of other fungi and most produce anamorphic yeast states. Basidiocarps (fruit bodies), when produced, are gelatinous and are colloquially classed among the "jelly fungi". Over 100 species of Tremella (in its wide sense) are currently recognized worldwide. One species, Tremella fuciformis, is commercially cultivated for food.

== Taxonomy ==
=== History ===
Tremella was one of the original genera created by Linnaeus in his Species Plantarum of 1753. The name comes from the Latin tremere meaning "to tremble". Linnaeus placed Tremella in the algae, including within it a variety of gelatinous growths, including seaweeds, cyanobacteria, and myxomycetes, as well as fungi. Subsequent authors added additional species to this mix, until Persoon revised Tremella in 1794 and 1801, repositioning the genus within the fungi.

Persoon's reinterpretation of Tremella was sufficiently radical to be considered a separate genus (Tremella Pers.) from that originally created by Linnaeus (Tremella L.). Tremella Pers. has now been conserved under the International Code of Nomenclature for algae, fungi, and plants, with Tremella mesenterica as the type species.

=== Current status ===
Molecular research, based on cladistic analysis of DNA sequences, has shown that Tremella (as previously understood) is polyphyletic (and hence artificial), with most species not closely related to the type. Accordingly, some species have been transferred to new genera and new families: Tremella foliacea and related species are now placed in the genus Phaeotremella within the family Phaeotremellaceae; Tremella encephala and related species are now placed in the genus Naematelia within the Naemateliaceae; Tremella moriformis and related species are now placed in the genus Pseudotremella within the Bulleraceae; and Tremella polyporina is now placed in the genus Carcinomyces within the Carcinomycetaceae. Several other species groups have not yet been renamed, pending further research.

More than 500 species have been described in Tremella, but most of these are old names either of doubtful application or for species later transferred to other genera. In its strict sense the genus Tremella now contains some 30-40 species, including the type Tremella mesenterica and the cultivated species T. fuciformis.

== Description ==
Fruit bodies, when present, are gelatinous. In some species they are small (under 5 mm across) and pustular to pulvinate (cushion-shaped). In others they are much larger (up to 150 mm across) and may be variously lobed, cephaliform (like a brain, with folds and ridges), or foliose (with leaf-like or seaweed-like fronds). Many Tremella species, however, are hymenial parasites, producing spores within the fruit bodies of their hosts, and are only visible microscopically.

=== Microscopic characters ===
Tremella species produce hyphae that are typically (but not always) clamped and have haustorial cells from which hyphal filaments seek out and penetrate the hyphae of the host. The basidia are "tremelloid" (globose to ellipsoid, sometimes stalked, and vertically or diagonally septate), giving rise to long, sinuous sterigmata or epibasidia on which the basidiospores are produced. These spores are smooth, globose to ellipsoid, and germinate by hyphal tube or by yeast cells. Conidiophores are often present, producing conidiospores that are similar to yeast cells.

== Habitat and distribution ==
Species are mainly parasitic on wood-rotting fungi in the phyla Ascomycota and Basidiomycota, particularly on species that occur on dead attached branches. Hosts include members of the corticioid fungi and Dacrymycetales in the Basidiomycota and species of Diaporthe, other Sordariomycetes, and lichens in the Ascomycota. Some Tremella species parasitize the fruit bodies of their hosts, others parasitize the mycelium within the wood.

As a group, Tremella species occur worldwide, though individual species may have a more restricted distribution.

== Species and hosts ==
The list below includes species of Tremella (in the wide sense) that have recently been described or redescribed based on fruit bodies. Species based on yeasts are not included. Some additional older species may also be valid, but lack a modern description. The type locality (but not the wider distribution) is given for each species together with the host fungus, where known. Species belonging to Tremella in the strict sense are marked as such, as are those that have been transferred to new genera.

Image	Name	Current Status	Type Locality	Host
	Tremella anaptychiae		Spain	Anaptychia ciliaris
	Tremella anomala		Brazil	Hypoxylon spp
	Tremella arachispora		Cameroon	unknown
	Tremella armeniaca	Tremella sensu stricto	Costa Rica	Xylaria sp?
	Tremella aurantia	Naematelia aurantia	USA	Stereum hirsutum
	Tremella aurantialba	Naematelia aurantialba	China	Stereum hirsutum
	Tremella aurantiolutea		Mexico	unknown
	Tremella australe	Tremella sensu stricto	China	unknown
	Tremella australiensis		Australia	Stereum spp
	Tremella basidiomaticola		China	Basidiomata of Tremella fuciformis
	Tremella boninensis	Tremella sensu stricto	Japan	unknown
	Tremella boraborensis		Tahiti	unknown
	Tremella brasiliensis	Tremella sensu stricto	Brazil	unknown
	Tremella callunicola		Scotland	Aleurodiscus norvegicus
	Tremella caloceraticola		Denmark	Calocera cornea
	Tremella caloplacae		Greece	Caloplaca spp(as Tremella sp. 1)
	Tremella candelariellae		Luxembourg	Candelariella spp
	Tremella cephalodiicola		Papua New Guinea	Psoroma pannarioides
	Tremella cerebriformis	Tremella sensu stricto	Taiwan	unknown
	Tremella cetrariellae		Norway	Cetrariella delisei
	Tremella cetrariicola		Scotland	Cetraria spp
	Tremella cheejenii	Tremella sensu stricto	China	deciduous wood
	Tremella christiansenii		Denmark	Physcia spp
	Tremella cladoniae		Germany	Cladonia spp
	Tremella clavisterigma		Guatemala	unknown
	Tremella coalescens	Tremella sensu stricto	USA	unknown
	Tremella coccocarpiae		Philippines	Coccocarpia rottleri
	Tremella coffeicolor		Bermuda	unknown(as T. auricularia)
	Tremella colpomaticola		Denmark	Colpoma quercinum
	Tremella compacta		Brazil	unknown
	Tremella coppinsii		Sarawak	Platismatia spp
	Tremella dactylobasidia		Spain	Dendrothele macrosporae
	Tremella dendrographae		USA	Dendrographa minor
	Tremella diaporthicola		USA	Diaporthe spp
	Tremella discicola		Belgium	Mollisia and Pyrenopeziza spp
	Tremella dumontii		Ecuador	unknown
	Tremella durissima		Argentina	unknown
	Tremella dysenterica	Tremella sensu stricto	Brazil	unknown
	Tremella encephala	Naematelia encephala	Europe	Stereum sanguinolentum
	Tremella erythrina	Tremella sensu stricto	China	deciduous wood
	Tremella everniae		China	Evernia mesomorpha
	Tremella exigua		France	Diaporthe spp
	Tremella fibulifera	Tremella sensu stricto	Brazil	unknown
	Tremella fimbriata	Phaeotremella fimbriata	Europe	Stereum rugosum
	Tremella flammea	Tremella sensu stricto	Japan	
	Tremella flava	Tremella sensu stricto	Taiwan	Hypoxylon spp
	Tremella foliacea	Phaeotremella foliacea	Europe	Stereum sanguinolentum
	Tremella frondosa	Phaeotremella frondosa	Europe	Stereum spp
	Tremella fuciformis	Tremella sensu stricto	Brazil	Annulohypoxylon archeri and other Annulohypoxylon and/or Hypoxylon spp.
	Tremella fungicola		Denmark	Mollisia cinerea
	Tremella fuscosuccinea	Phaeotremella fuscosuccinea	Taiwan	unknown
	Tremella giraffa		Germany	Dacrymyces spp
	Tremella globispora	Tremella sensu stricto	England	Diaporthe spp
	Tremella graphidastrae		Papua New Guinea	Graphidastra multiformis
	Tremella guangxiensis	Tremella sensu stricto	China	unknown
	Tremella guttiformis		Sri Lanka	unknown
	Tremella haematommatis		USA	Haematomma puniceum
	Tremella hainanensis	Tremella sensu stricto	China	unknown
	Tremella harrisii		USA	Polymeridium catapastum
	Tremella huuskonenii			Raesaenenia huuskonenii
	Tremella hymenophaga		Spain	Scytinostroma odoratum
	Tremella hypocenomycis		Finland	Hypocenomyce spp
	Tremella hypogymniae		France	Hypogymnia spp
	Tremella iduensis	Tremella sensu stricto	Japan	Hypoxylon spp
	Tremella imshaugiae		USA	Imshaugia aleurites
	Tremella indecorata		Norway	Diatrype bullata
	Tremella invasa		Denmark	Trechispora spp
	Tremella karstenii		Finland	Colpoma juniperi
	Tremella latispora	Tremella sensu stricto	China	unknown
	Tremella leptogii		Peru	Leptogium sp.
	Tremella lethariae		Canada	Letharia vulpina
	Tremella lichenicola		Luxembourg	Mycoblastus fucatus
	Tremella lilacea		Costa Rica	Diaporthe sp?
	Tremella lloydiae-candidae	Tremella sensu stricto	Japan	unknown
	Tremella lobariacearum		Madeira	Lobariaceae spp
	Tremella macroceratis		Norway	Cladonia macroceras
	Tremella mangensis		China	unknown
	Tremella mesenterella	Tremella sensu stricto	Canada	Peniophora spp
	Tremella mesenterica	Tremella sensu stricto	Sweden	Peniophora spp
	Tremella microcarpa		Papua New Guinea	lichen sp.
	Tremella microspora	Naematelia microspora	South Africa	Stereum spp
	Tremella monospora		Peru	Leptogium sp.
	Tremella montis-wilhelmii		Papua New Guinea	Normandina simodense sp.
	Tremella moriformis	Pseudotremella moriformis	England	Diaporthe spp
	Tremella mycetophiloides	Phaeotremella mycetophiloides	Japan	Aleurodiscus amorphus and A. grantii
	Tremella mycophaga	Phaeotremella mycophaga	Canada	Aleurodiscus amorphus and A. grantii
	Tremella nashii		USA	Usnea sorediifera
	Tremella nephromatis		Canada	Nephroma parile
	Tremella nieblae		USA	Niebla cephalota
	Tremella nigrifacta		Costa Rica	Diatrypella sp.
	Tremella nivalis	Pseudotremella nivalis	Taiwan	Diatrype spp
	Tremella normandinae		Hawaii	Normandina pulchella
	Tremella obscura		USA	Dacrymyces spp
	Tremella occultifuroidea		Taiwan	Dacrymyces spp
	Tremella olens	Tremella sensu stricto	Australia	unknown
	Tremella papuana		Papua New Guinea	Hypogymnia pseudobitteriana
	Tremella parmeliarum		Papua New Guinea	Parmotrema spp
	Tremella parmeliellae		Papua New Guinea	Parmeliella foliicola
	Tremella penetrans		Denmark	Dacrymyces spp
	Tremella pertusariae		Northern Ireland	Pertusaria spp
	Tremella phaeographidis		England	Phaeographis spp
	Tremella phaeographinae		USA	Phaeographina spp
	Tremella phaeophysciae		Denmark	Phaeophyscia orbicularis
	Tremella philippinensis	Tremella sensu stricto	Philippines	unknown
	Tremella poilkavensis		India	Biscogniauxia sp.
	Tremella polyporina	Carcinomyces polyporinus	Scotland	Postia spp
	Tremella protoparmeliae		England	Protoparmelia spp
	Tremella pseudocyphellariae		Mauritius	Pseudocyphellaria desfontainii
	Tremella psoroglaenae		Papua New Guinea	Psoroglaena spp
	Tremella psoromicola		Chile	Psoroma spp
	Tremella puncteliae		Mexico	Punctelia borreri
	Tremella puncteliotegens		New Zealand	Punctelia borreri
	Tremella purpurascentis		USA	Dirinaria purpurascens
	Tremella pyrenaica		France	Lecanora polytropa
	Tremella ramalinae		Mexico	Ramalina spp
	Tremella ramboidiae		USA	Ramboldia haematites
	Tremella resupinata	Tremella sensu stricto	Taiwan	Hypoxylon spp
	Tremella rhabdodisci		Japan	Rhabdodiscus inalbescens
	Tremella rhizocarpicola		Norway	
	Tremella rinodinae		Denmark	Rinodina spp
	Tremella robusta		USA	Roccellina fransciscana
	Tremella rosea		Austria	unknown
	Tremella roseolutescens	Tremella sensu stricto	Costa Rica	unknown
	Tremella rubromaculata	Tremella sensu stricto	Guatemala	unknown
	Tremella salmonea	Tremella sensu stricto	China	deciduous wood
	Tremella samoensis	Tremella sensu stricto	Samoa	unknown
	Tremella sanguinea	Phaeotremella	China	Stereum sp.
	Tremella santessonii		Zimbabwe	Usnea spp
	Tremella sarcographae		Brazil	Sarcographa medusulina
	Tremella sarniensis		Guernsey	Phanerochaete sordida
	Tremella seclusa		France	unknown
	Tremella silvae-dravedae		Denmark	unknown
	Tremella simplex	Phaeotremella simplex	Canada	Aleurodiscus amorphus
	Tremella spicifera		Belgium	Massarina arundinacea
	Tremella steidleri		Czech Republic	Stereum hirsutum
	Tremella stevensiana		Australia	Usnea confusa
	Tremella stictae		Rwanda	Sticta weigelii
	Tremella strigulae		USA	Strigula stigmatella
	Tremella subalpina		Russia	unknown
	Tremella subencephala		Canada	Acanthophysium lividocoeruleum
	Tremella subfibulifera	Tremella sensu stricto	Brazil	unknown
	Tremella subrubiginosa	Tremella sensu stricto	Panama	unknown
	Tremella sulcariae		China	Sulcaria sulcata
	Tremella synarthoniae		USA	Synarthonia inconspicua
	Tremella taiwanensis	Tremella sensu stricto	Taiwan	unknown
	Tremella tawa	Tremella sensu stricto	New Zealand	unknown
	Tremella telleriae		Spain	Postia spp
	Tremella teloschistis		USA	Teloschistes exilis
	Tremella tornabeae		Canary Islands	Tornabea scutellifera
	Tremella translucens	Phaeotremella translucens	Scotland	Lophodermium spp(as Sirotrema translucens)
	Tremella tremelloides	Naematelia	USA	Stereum sp.
	Tremella tropica	Tremella sensu stricto	Taiwan	unknown
	Tremella tubulosae		Scotland	Hypogymnia tubulosa
	Tremella tuckerae		USA	Ramalina sinensis
	Tremella umbilicariae		Peru	Umbilicaria sp.
	Tremella versicolor		England	Peniophora spp
	Tremella vesiculosa		New Zealand	Xylaria sp?
	Tremella volcanagua		Guatemala	unknown
	Tremella wedinii		USA	
	Tremella wirthii		Germany	Protoparmelia sp.
	Tremella wrightii		Cuba	unknown
	Tremella xanthomendozae		USA	Gallowayella weberi
	Tremella yokohamensis	Tremella sensu stricto	Japan	unknown
	Tremella zamorae		USA	Lecanora louisianae
	Tremella zhejiangensis	Tremella sensu stricto	China	unknown
