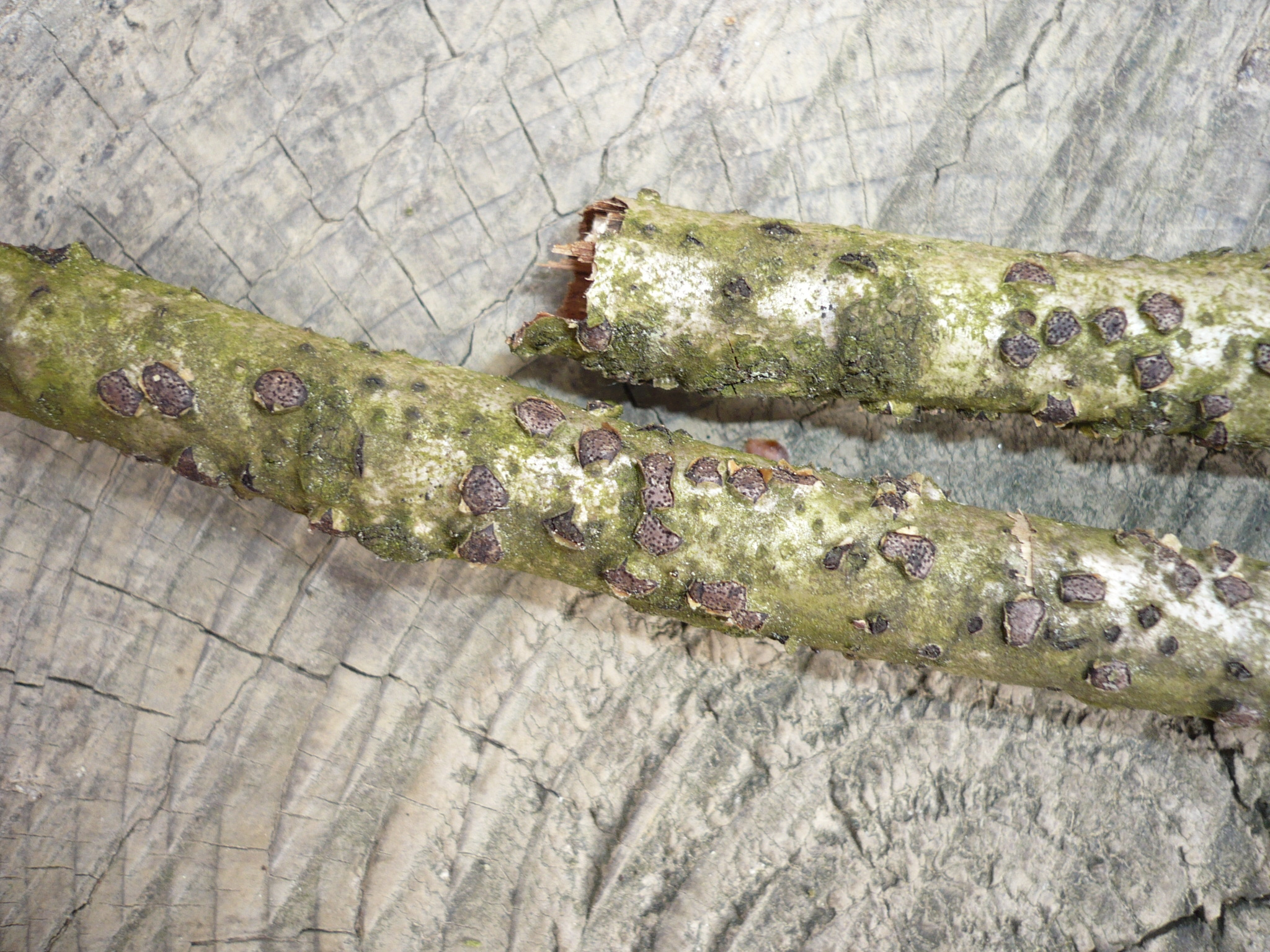
- Diatrypella quercina

Scientific classification
- Domain: Eukaryota
- Kingdom: Fungi
- Division: Ascomycota
- Class: Sordariomycetes
- Order: Xylariales
- Family: Diatrypaceae
- Genus: Diatrypella (Ces. & De Not.) De Not.

Type species
- Diatrypella verruciformis (Ehrh.) Nitschke

= Diatrypella =

Genus of fungi

Diatrypella is a genus of fungi in the family Diatrypaceae. The genus has a widespread distribution and contains 33 species.
