= Derek Reid =

English mycologist (1927–2006)

Derek Agutter Reid
- Born: 2 September 1927; Leighton Buzzard, Bedfordshire
- Died: 18 January 2006 (aged 78)
- Education: University College, Hull
- Known for: Contributions to taxonomic mycology; Study of Aphyllophorales
- Spouses: Pamela Saich (1953-?); Sheila Glover (1987-2006)
- Children: David G. Reid
- Scientific career
- Fields: Mycology
- Workplaces: Royal Botanic Gardens, Kew; University of Pretoria
- Author abbrev. (botany): D.A.Reid

Derek Agutter Reid (2 September 1927 – 18 January 2006) was an English mycologist.

== Background and education ==
Reid was born in Leighton Buzzard, Bedfordshire, the son of a picture-framer. He was educated at Cedars School and the University of Hull, where he studied geology and botany. He gained his PhD from the University of London in 1964, for a thesis (later published) on stipitate stereoid fungi.

== Mycological career and travels ==
In 1951, he became assistant to Dr R.W.G. Dennis, head of mycology at the Royal Botanic Gardens, Kew. On his retirement in 1975, Derek Reid took over his position and remained at Kew till his own retirement in 1987.

Derek Reid was a naturalist and enthusiastic field mycologist, leading regular fungus forays in his native Bedfordshire for over 40 years, as well as tutoring fungus identification courses at Field Studies Centres, and evening classes at the University of London. He published the popular field guide to British fungi; Mushrooms and Toadstools: A Kingfisher Guide, in 1980. He was also able to travel far more widely than his predecessors at Kew, visiting and collecting fungi in continental Europe, the United States, the West Indies, Australia, and South Africa. His particular interest in South African fungi led to several joint papers with his fellow mycologist Prof. Albert Eicker at the University of Pretoria. In 1989, after his retirement from Kew, Reid stayed for some while in Pretoria, as visiting professor at the university.

Derek Reid's main interest was in the taxonomy of fungi, especially (but not exclusively) the Basidiomycota. He published over 200 papers on British and overseas species, mostly on agarics but also on heterobasidiomycetes, gasteromycetes, and other macrofungi, describing many new species. Several fungal species have been named after him, including Volvariella reidii, Peniophora reidii, and the common European Waxcap Hygrocybe reidii.

Reid was a talented artist, and illustrated his own papers. Many of his paintings of rare fungi were published in his series "Coloured Icones of Rare and Interesting Fungi" in the journal Nova Hedwigia. He also created paintings depicting several type specimens and other fungi in the Kew Herbarium, which are now preserved in collections at Kew.

== Selected publications ==
- Reid, D.A. (1955). New or interesting records of Australasian basidiomycetes. Kew Bulletin 1955: 631–648
- Reid, D.A. (1965). A monograph of the stipitate stereoid fungi. (Beihefte zur Nova Hedwigia 18) 388 pp., 50 pls
- Reid, D.A. (1974). A monograph of the British Dacrymycetales. Transactions of the British Mycological Society 62: 433–494
- Reid, D.A. (1977). Some gasteromycetes from Trinidad and Tobago. Kew Bulletin 31: 657–690
- Reid, D. A. (1979). "A Monograph of the Australian Species of Amanita Pers. ex Hook. (Fungi)". Australian Journal of Botany Supplementary Series. 10 (8).
- Reid, D.A. (1980). Mushrooms and toadstools. London: Kingfisher
- Reid, D.A. (1990). New or interesting records of British heterobasidiomycetes. Mycological Research 94: 94–108
- Reid, D.A. & Eicker, A. (1991). A taxonomic survey of the genus Montagnea with special reference to South Africa. South African Journal of Botany 57: 161–170

== See also ==
- Category:Taxa named by Derek Reid
