= Broad-leaved tree =

Any tree that has broad leaves

A broad-leaved, broad-leaf, or broadleaf tree is any tree within the diverse botanical group of angiosperms that has flat leaves and produces seeds inside of fruits. It is one of two general types of trees, the other being a conifer, a tree with needle-like or scale-like leaves and seeds borne in woody cones. Broad-leaved trees are sometimes known as hardwoods.

Most deciduous trees are broad-leaved, but some are coniferous, like larches.

== Tree types ==
Two general types of woody trees
Gymnosperms (seed plants not flowering)	Angiosperms (flowering seed plants)
Coniferous (females bearing ovulate cones that release unenclosed seeds at maturity)	Fruit-bearing (enclosing seeds within)
Usually evergreen (gradually shedding foliage, green foliage throughout year)	Usually deciduous (seasonally shedding all foliage, no foliage for part of year)
Known as softwoods (nonporous, wood typically lighter and softer)	Known as hardwoods (wood structure porous and more complex, wood generally harder)
Usually needle-like or scale-like leaves	Broad leaves
Examples: firs, spruces, pines	Examples: hickories, maples, oaks

== Gallery ==
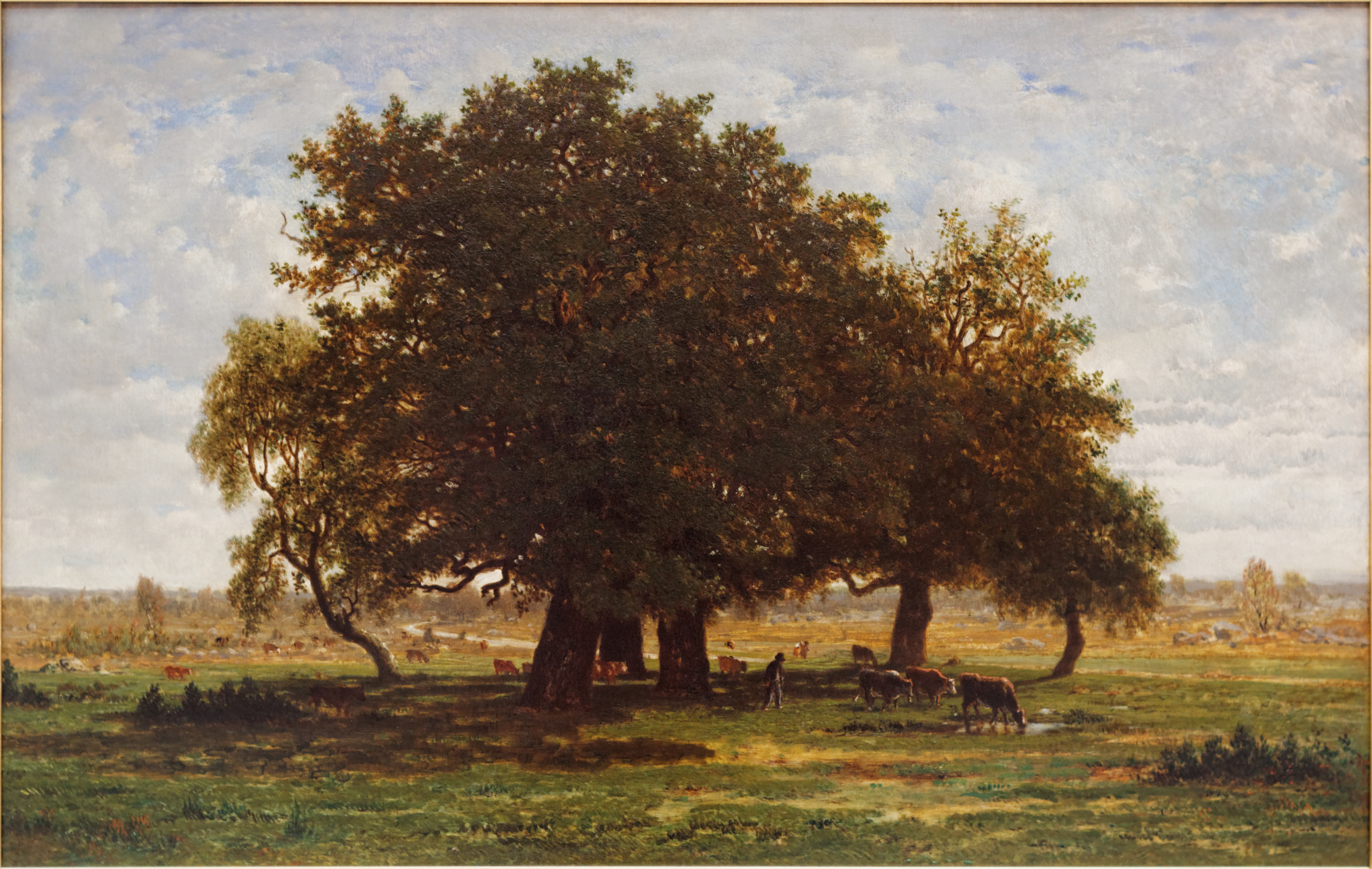
Chênes Apremont by Théodore Rousseau

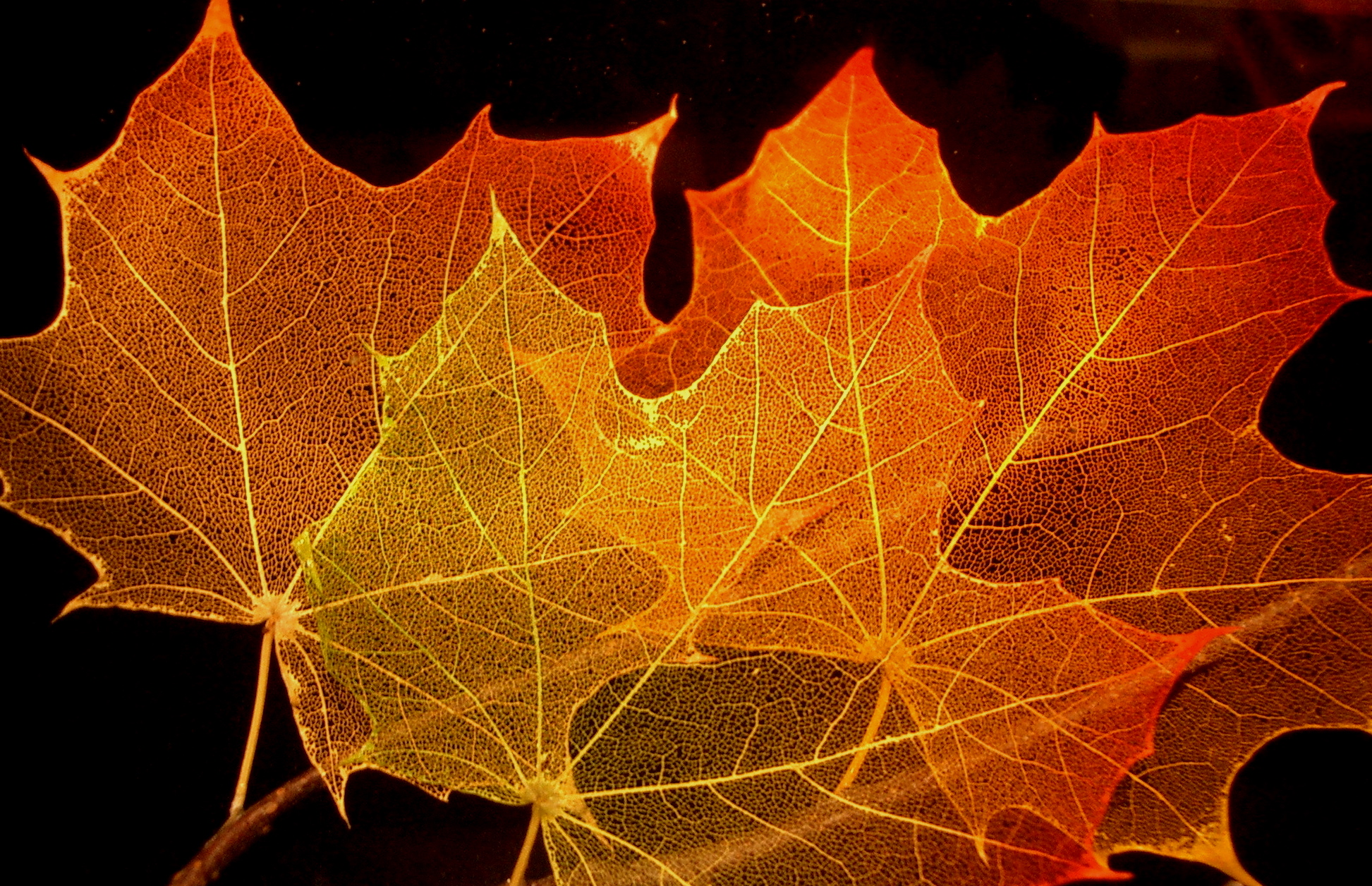
Maple leaves by autumn

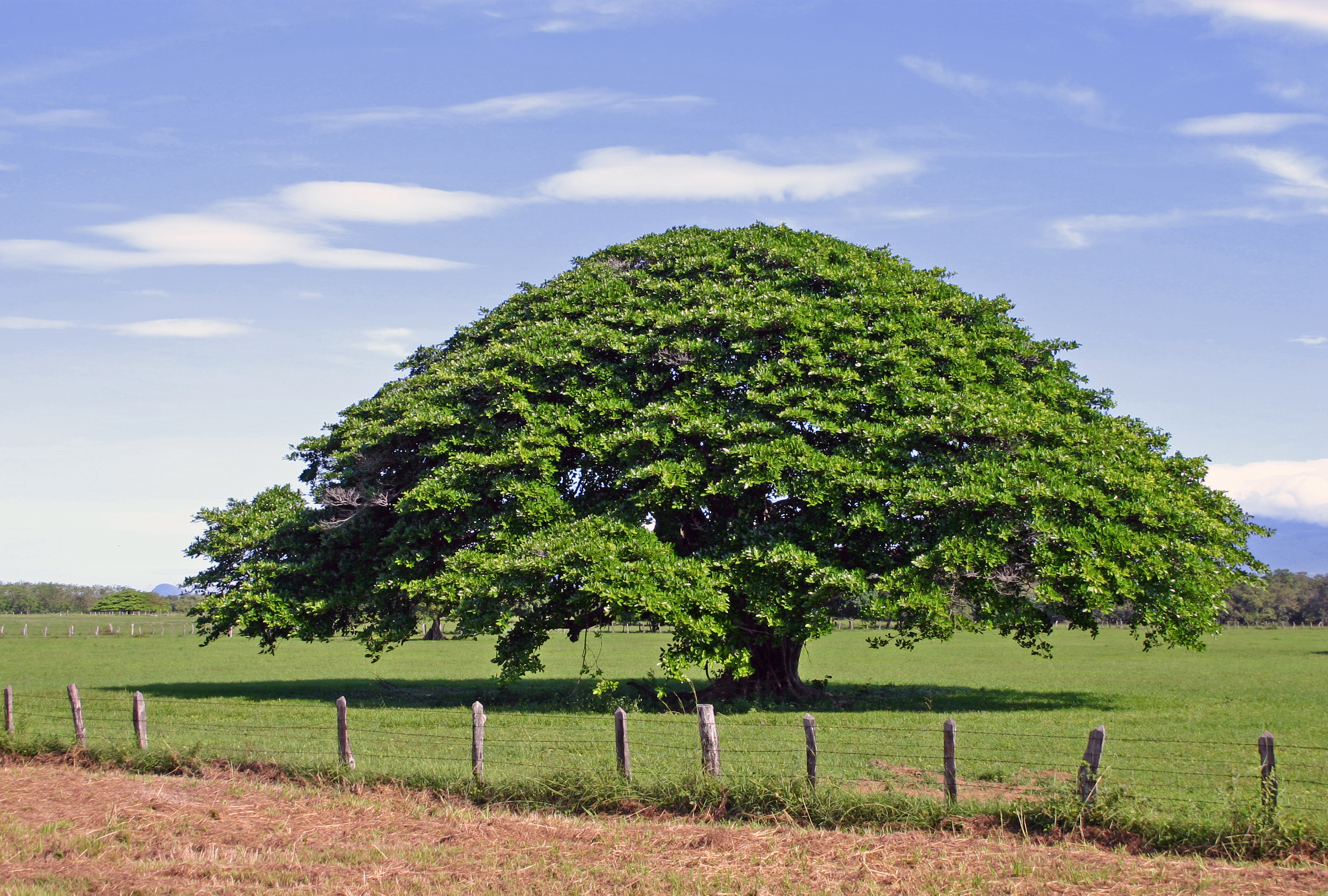
Fig tree

Fruit of broad-leaved trees

== See also ==
- Leaf
- Temperate broadleaf and mixed forests
- Mixed coniferous forest
- Tropical and subtropical dry broadleaf forests
