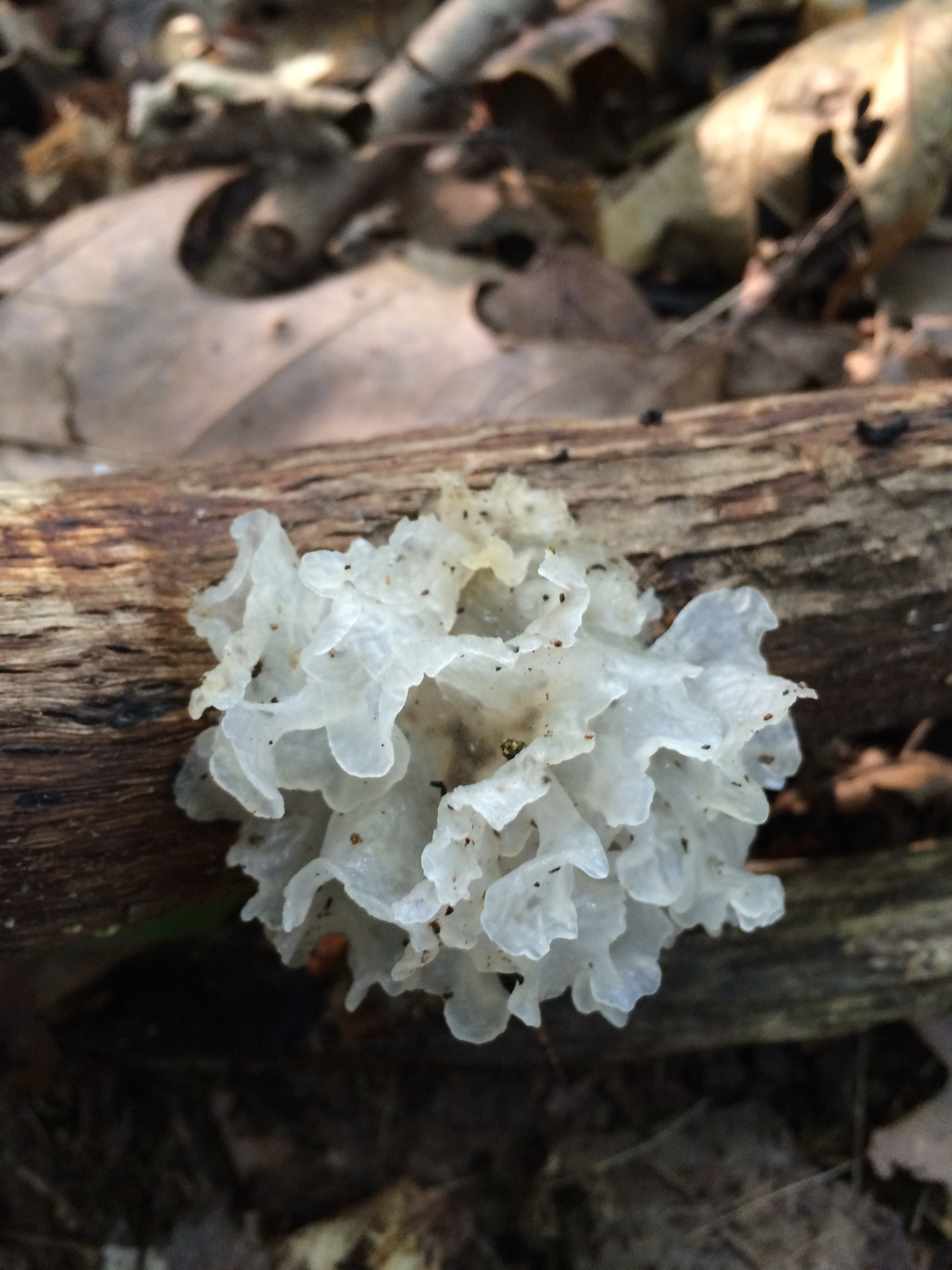
- Gelatinous fruit body of Tremella fuciformis

Scientific classification
- Kingdom: Fungi
- Division: Basidiomycota
- Class: Tremellomycetes
- Order: Tremellales
- Family: Tremellaceae; Fr.

Type genus
- Tremella Pers.

Genera
- Dictyotremella; Tremella

= Tremellaceae =

Family of fungi

The Tremellaceae are a family of fungi in the order Tremellales. The family is cosmopolitan and contains both teleomorphic and anamorphic species, most of the latter being yeasts. All teleomorphs in the Tremellaceae are parasites of other fungi, though the yeast states are widespread and not restricted to hosts. Basidiocarps (fruit bodies), when produced, are gelatinous.

The family currently comprises the single genus Tremella, containing around 40 species. The name previously covered a much wider range of genera within the Tremellales, but molecular research, based on cladistic analysis of DNA sequences, now places these genera in separate families.

== History ==
Fries created the family Tremellaceae (as 'Tremellini') in 1821, basing it on the macromorphology of fruit bodies. He included within it most species of fungi that were gelatinous, dividing it into the genera Agyrium, Dacrymyces, Exidia, Hymenella, Naematelia, and Tremella. Agyrium and Hymenella are now referred to the Ascomycota, as are several of the species Fries placed in Dacrymyces and Tremella.

In 1900 Patouillard radically revised the family by switching the emphasis to the micromorphology of fruit bodies. For Patouillard, the Tremellaceae was limited to genera and species in which the basidia were "tremelloid" (globose to ellipsoid with vertical or diagonal septa), whether or not the fruit bodies were gelatinous. Patouillard's revised Tremellaceae included the genera Clavariopsis (= Holtermannia), Ditangium, Exidia, Guepinia, Heterochaete, Hyaloria, Protomerulius, Sebacina, Sirobasidium, Tremella, and Tremellodon (= Pseudohydnum).

The next major revision was in 1984, when Robert Bandoni used transmission electron microscopy to investigate the ultrastructure of the septal pore apparatus in species of the Tremellaceae. This revealed that Tremella and its allies were distinct from Exidia and its allies, despite both groups having tremelloid basidia. Bandoni referred the latter group to the Auriculariaceae, restricting the Tremellaceae to the genera Holtermannia, Tremella, and Trimorphomyces. The genus Sirobasidium and its allies were placed in the Sirobasidiaceae.

== Current status ==
Molecular research, based on cladistic analysis of DNA sequences, confirms Bandoni's split between the tremelloid and exidioid fungi and extends the circumscription of the tremelloid group by including several yeasts whose status was formerly uncertain. It has, however, shown that the Tremellaceae (as previously circumscribed) is polyphyletic (hence artificial) with most genera belonging in different families. As a result, the Tremellaceae is now restricted to the genus Tremella which is itself restricted to those species closely related to the type Tremella mesenterica.
