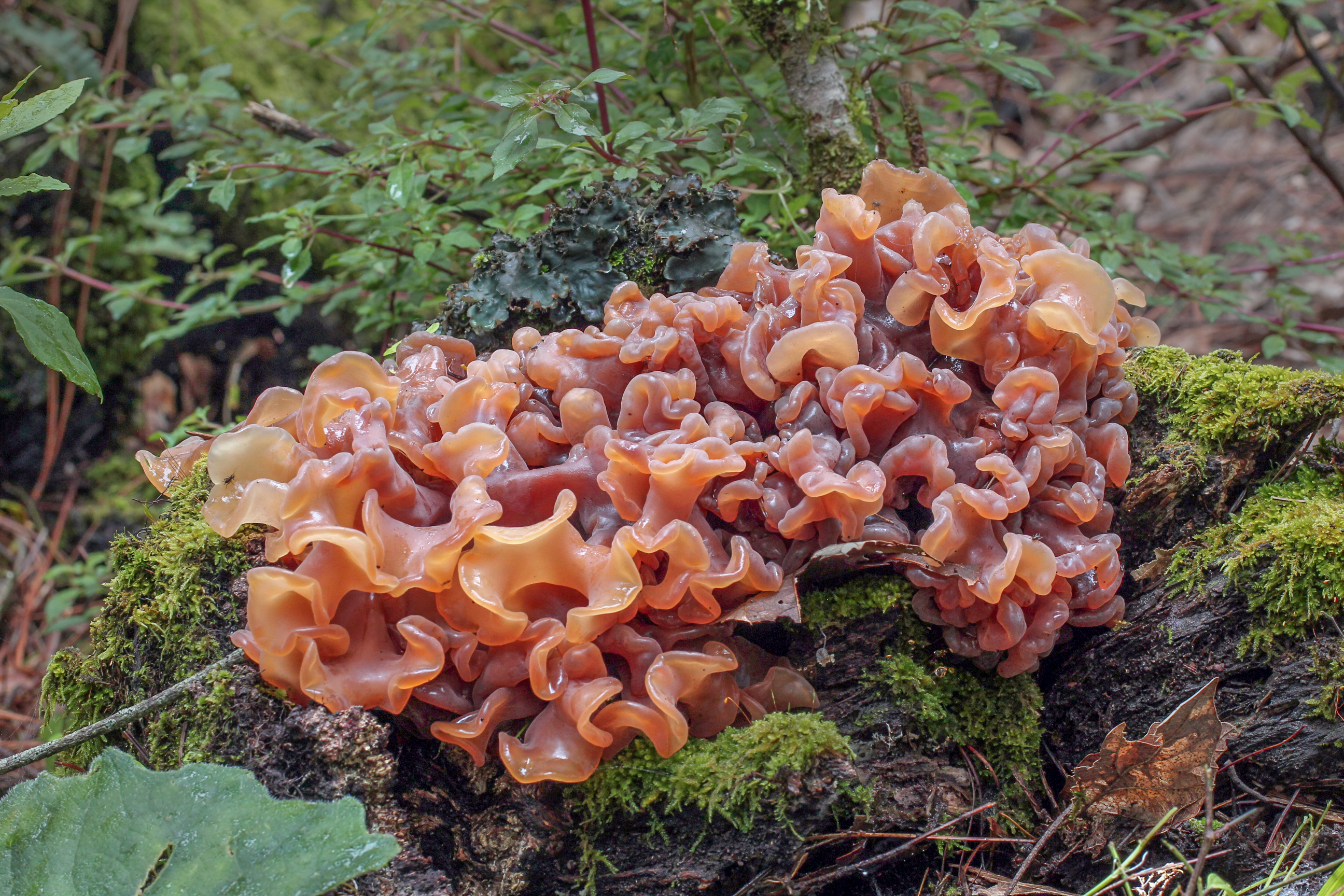
- Gelatinous fruit body of Phaeotremella frondosa

Scientific classification
- Kingdom: Fungi
- Division: Basidiomycota
- Class: Tremellomycetes
- Order: Tremellales; Fr.

Families
- Bulleraceae; Bulleribasidiaceae; Carcinomycetaceae; Cryptococcaceae; Cuniculitremaceae; Naemateliaceae; Phaeotremellaceae; Rhynchogastremaceae; Sirobasidiaceae; Tremellaceae; Trimorphomycetaceae

= Tremellales =

Order of fungi

The Tremellales are an order of fungi in the class Tremellomycetes. The order contains both teleomorphic and anamorphic species, most of the latter being yeasts. All teleomorphic species in the Tremellales are parasites of other fungi, though the yeast states are widespread and not restricted to hosts. Basidiocarps (fruit bodies), when produced, are gelatinous.

The order currently comprises 11 families, containing around 250 valid species. Significant genera include Tremella, one species of which is edible and commercially cultivated, and the yeast genus Cryptococcus, several species of which are human pathogens.

== History ==
The order Tremellales was created (as 'Tremellinae') by Swedish mycologist Elias Magnus Fries in 1821 for fungi having gelatinous fruit bodies. it was amended in 1922 by English mycologist Carleton Rea to include all species, gelatinous or not, in which the basidia were "tremelloid" (globose to ellipsoid with vertical or diagonal septa). Rea placed within it one family, the Tremellaceae, having the same characteristics as the order.

Rea's circumscription was generally accepted until the 1980s. In 1945, however, G.W. Martin proposed a substantial extension of the order to include all the species within the (now obsolete) class Heterobasidiomycetes except for the rusts and the smuts. Martin therefore included within the Tremellales not only the Tremellaceae, but also the Auriculariaceae, Dacrymycetaceae, Hyaloriaceae, Phleogenaceae, Septobasidiaceae, Sirobasidiaceae, and Tulasnellaceae (including Ceratobasidium). This extended version of the order was not widely adopted, but was used in a number of publications by Martin himself and, as late as the 1970s, by his student Bernard Lowy.

A more precise revision was undertaken in 1984, when Robert Bandoni used transmission electron microscopy to investigate the ultrastructure of the septal pore apparatus in species of the Tremellales. This revealed that Tremella and its allies were distinct from Exidia and its allies, despite both groups having tremelloid basidia. Bandoni referred the latter group to the Auriculariales, restricting the Tremellales to the Tremellaceae, Sirobasidiaceae, and Tetragoniomycetaceae.

== Current status ==
Molecular research, based on cladistic analysis of DNA sequences, confirms Bandoni's split between the tremelloid and exidioid fungi and extends the circumscription of the tremelloid group by including several yeast genera whose status was formerly uncertain. Molecular research has also indicated that the genus Cryptococcus should be included within the group.

== Genera incertae sedis ==
Several genera in the Tremellales are of uncertain (incertae sedis) familial placement. These are:

- Biatoropsis Räsänen (1934) – 5 spp.
- Dictyotremella Kobayasi (1971) – 1 sp.
- Neotremella Lowy (1979) – 1 sp.
- Sigmogloea Bandoni & J.C.Krug (2000) – 1 sp.
- Sirotrema Bandoni (1986) – 3 spp.
- Tremellina Bandoni (1986) – 1 sp.
- Xenolachne D.P.Rogers (1947) – 2 spp.
