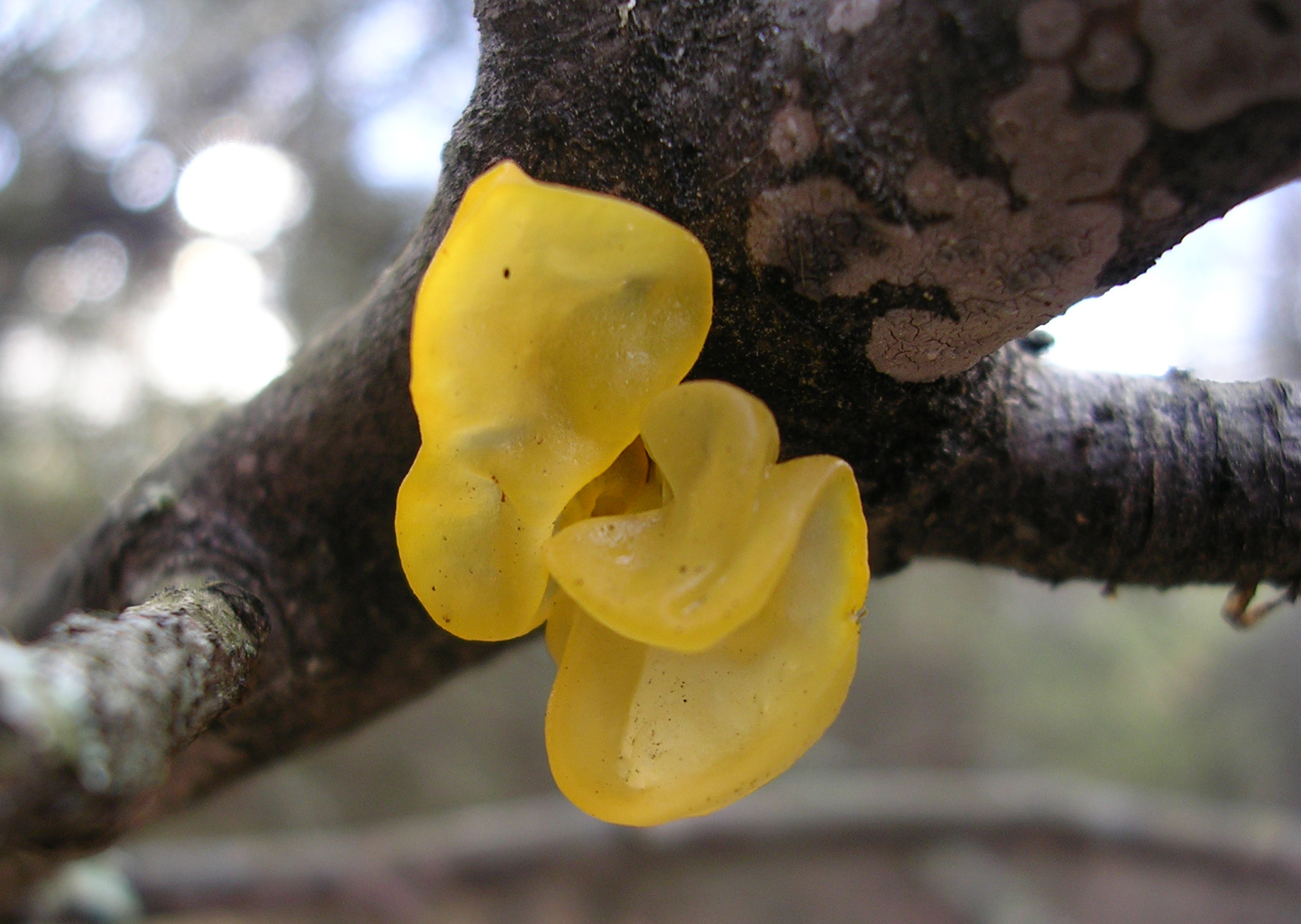
- Tremella mesenterica

Scientific classification
- Kingdom: Fungi
- Division: Basidiomycota
- Subdivision: Agaricomycotina
- Class: Tremellomycetes; Hibbett, Matheny & Manfr. Binder (2007)

Orders
- Chionasterales; Cystofilobasidiales; Filobasidiales; Holtermanniales; Tremellales; Trichosporonales

= Tremellomycetes =

Class of fungi

The Tremellomycetes are a class of dimorphic fungi in the Agaricomycotina. Some species have gelatinous basidiocarps (fruiting bodies) or (microscopically) a sacculate parenthesome. There are six orders, 17 families, and 39 genera in the Tremellomycetes. Tremellomycetes include yeasts, dimorphic taxa, and species that form complex fruiting bodies. Tremellomycetes include some fungi that are human and animal pathogens in the genera Cryptococcus, Naganishia, Papiliotrema, and Trichosporon and some fungi that are cultivated for food in the genera Tremella and Naematelia.

Tremellomycetidae Locq. is a class of lichen in the Basidiomycota division. It only held one order, Tremellales. It was also a former class within the fungi system, up until the late 1990s. Swann and Taylor in their revision in 1995 had two classes in the Hymenomycetes: Hymenomycetidae (containing non-yeast fungi, mushrooms and puffballs) and Tremellomycetidae (holding the rest). Subsequent revisions to the fungi system removed it in favour of Tremellomycetes.
