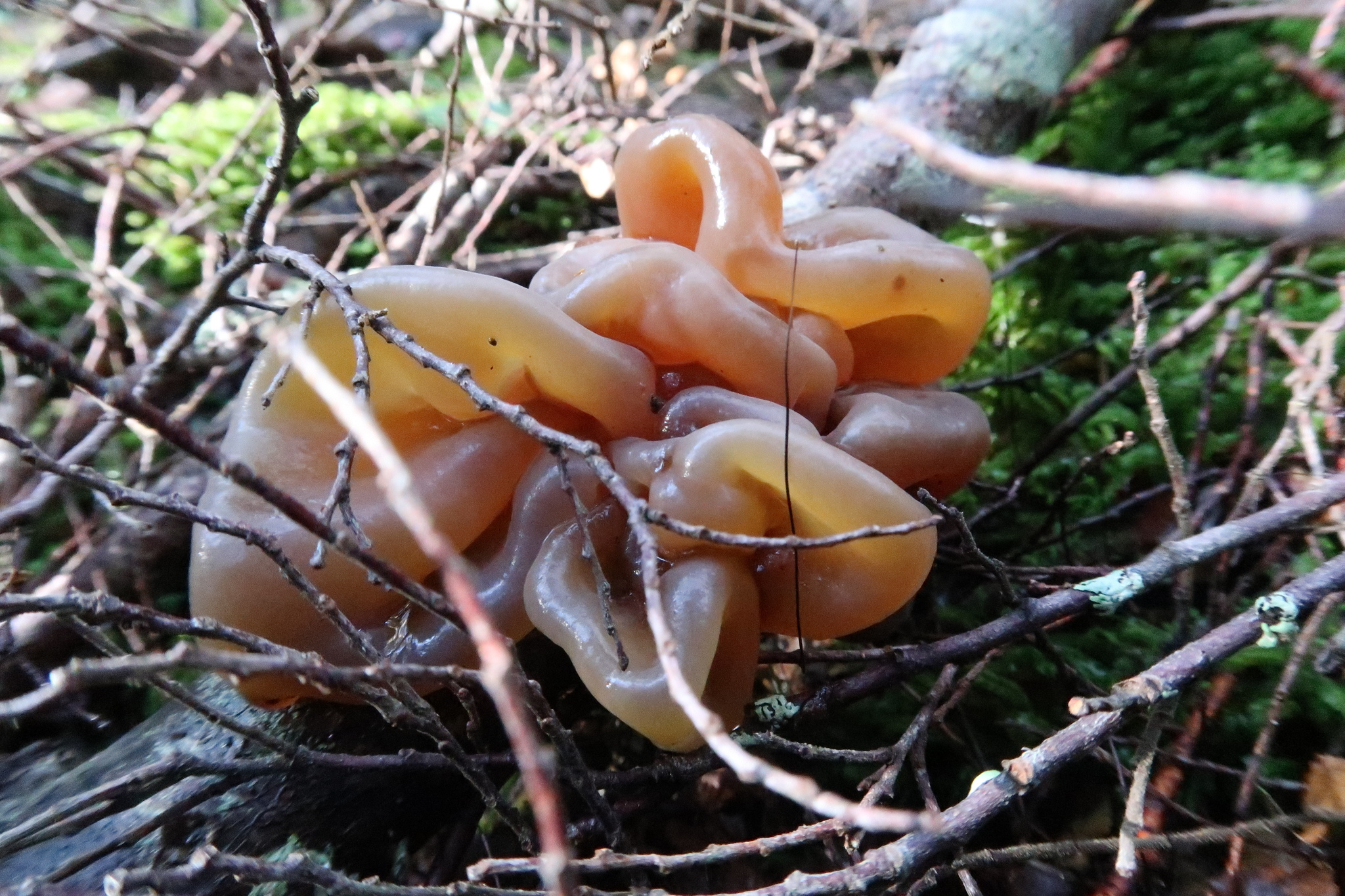

Scientific classification
- Kingdom: Fungi
- Division: Basidiomycota
- Class: Tremellomycetes
- Order: Tremellales
- Family: Phaeotremellaceae
- Genus: Phaeotremella
- Species: P. fimbriata

Binomial name
- Phaeotremella fimbriata (Pers.) Spirin & Malysheva (2018)

Synonyms
- Tremella fimbriata Pers. (1800)

= Phaeotremella fimbriata =

Species of fungus

Phaeotremella fimbriata is a species of fungus in the family Phaeotremellaceae. It produces blackish, frondose, gelatinous basidiocarps (fruit bodies) and is parasitic on the mycelium of Stereum rugosum, a fungus that grows on dead attached and recently fallen branches of broad-leaved trees. It is widespread in northern Europe. Prior to 2017, the species was generally considered a synonym of Tremella foliacea, but this latter species (now known as Phaeotremella foliacea) is restricted to conifers. Phaeotremella frondosa is a similar-looking but paler, brown species on broad-leaved trees and occurs in North America as well as Europe.

== Taxonomy ==
Tremella fimbriata was first published in 1800 by South African-born mycologist Christiaan Hendrik Persoon, together with Tremella foliacea. Most subsequent authors considered the two species synonymous, with T. foliacea the preferred name (more rarely T. fimbriata). It was not until molecular research, based on cladistic analysis of DNA sequences, revealed that Tremella foliacea sensu lato covered several similar but distinct species, that the name Phaeotremella fimbriata was distinguished and recognized in its current sense.

== Description ==
Fruit bodies are gelatinous, dark blackish brown becoming black, up to 4 cm (1.5 in) across, and seaweed-like (with branched, undulating fronds). Microscopically, the hyphae are clamped and occur in a dense gelatinous matrix. Haustorial cells arise on the hyphae, producing filaments that attach to and penetrate the hyphae of the host. The basidia are tremelloid (globose to ellipsoid, with oblique to vertical septa), 9 to 14 by 9 to 12 μm, usually unstalked. The basidiospores are mostly ellipsoid, smooth, 5 to 8 by 4.5 to 6.5 μm, and germinate by hyphal tube or by yeast cells.

== Similar species ==
Phaeotremella frondosa is a common and widespread species parasitizing Stereum hirsutum and other Stereum species on broad-leaved trees. It produces larger and paler brown fruit bodies than Phaeotremella fimbriata and has slightly larger spores (6 to 10 by 5 to 9 μm). Phaeotremella foliacea parasitizes Stereum sanguinolentum on conifers.

== Habitat and distribution ==
Phaeotremella fimbriata is a parasite of Stereum rugosum, growing on the host's hyphae in the wood rather than on the host's fruit bodies. Following its hosts, fruit bodies of P. fimbriata are typically found on dead, attached or recently fallen branches of broad-leaved trees, particularly alder.

The species is currently known only from northern Europe.
