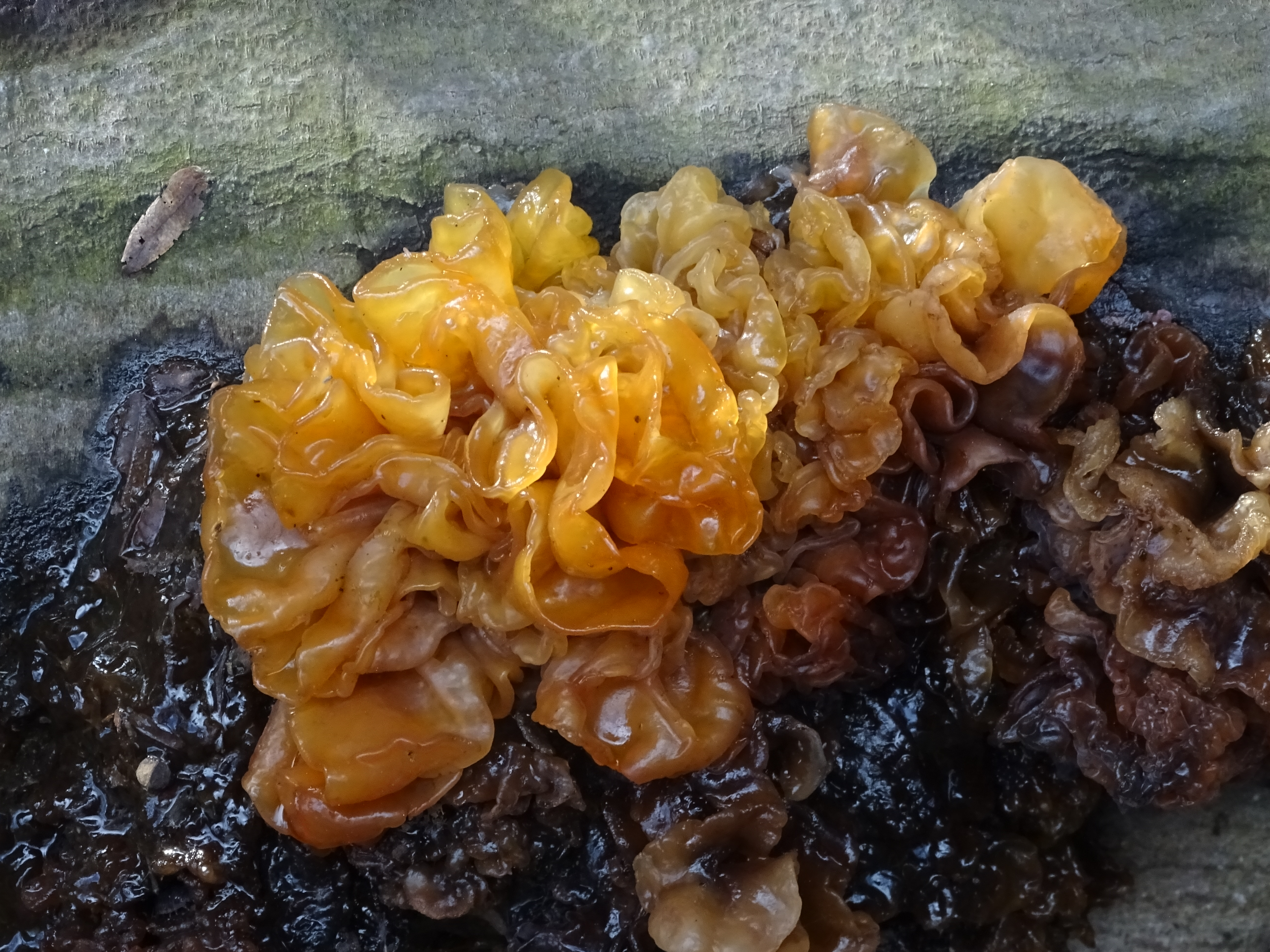

Scientific classification
- Kingdom: Fungi
- Division: Basidiomycota
- Class: Tremellomycetes
- Order: Tremellales
- Family: Phaeotremellaceae
- Genus: Phaeotremella
- Species: P. foliacea

Binomial name
- Phaeotremella foliacea (Pers.) Wedin, J.C. Zamora & Millanes (2016)

Synonyms
- Tremella foliacea Pers. (1800); Gyraria foliacea (Pers.) Gray (1821); Ulocolla foliacea (Pers.) Bref. (1888); Exidia foliacea (Pers.) P.Karst. (1889); Tremella neofoliacea Chee J. Chen (1998); Cryptococcus skinneri Phaff & Carmo Sousa (1962); Phaeotremella skinneri (Phaff & Carmo Sousa) A.M. Yurkov & T. Boekhout (2015)

= Phaeotremella foliacea =

Species of fungus

Phaeotremella foliacea
- Mycological characteristics
- Smooth hymenium
- No distinct cap
- Hymenium attachment is irregular or not applicable
- Lacks a stipe
- Spore print is white
- Ecology is parasitic
- Edibility is edible

Phaeotremella foliacea (synonym Tremella foliacea) is a species of fungus in the family Phaeotremellaceae. In the UK it has the recommended English name leafy brain and has also been called jelly leaf and brown witch's butter. It produces brownish, frondose, gelatinous basidiocarps (fruit bodies) and is parasitic on the mycelium of Stereum sanguinolentum, a fungus that grows on dead attached and recently fallen branches of conifers. It is widespread in north temperate regions.

== Taxonomy ==
Tremella foliacea was first published in 1800 by South African-born mycologist Christiaan Hendrik Persoon. The name remained in use until molecular research, based on cladistic analysis of DNA sequences, showed that Tremella foliacea was not closely related to the type species of Tremella but belonged in a separate genus, Phaeotremella. Similar-looking species under the name Tremella foliacea that grow on broad-leaved trees were distinguished c. 2017 as Phaeotremella frondosa and P. fimbriata. The name P. foliacea is restricted to the fungus that grows on conifers.

The epithet "foliacea" means "leafy", with reference to the shape of the fruit bodies.

Herman Phaff and L. do Carmo Sousa described the yeast Cryptococcus skinneri in 1962 from the frass of the beetle Scolytus tsugae feeding on Western Hemlock (Tsuga heterophylla). DNA sequencing has shown that this is the yeast state of Phaeotremella foliacea.

== Description ==
Fruit bodies are gelatinous, brown to dark brown, up to 5 cm (2 in) across, and seaweed-like (with branched, undulating fronds). Microscopically, the hyphae are clamped and occur in a dense gelatinous matrix. Haustorial cells arise on the hyphae, producing filaments that attach to and penetrate the hyphae of the host. The basidia are tremelloid (globose to ellipsoid, with oblique to vertical septa), 12 to 18 by 10 to 14 μm, usually unstalked. The basidiospores are mostly ellipsoid, smooth, 5.5 to 9.5 by 4.5 to 8.5 μm, and germinate by hyphal tube or by yeast cells.

=== Similar species ===
Phaeotremella frondosa is a common and widespread species parasitizing Stereum species on broadleaf trees. It often produces larger and paler fruit bodies than P. foliacea. Phaeotremella fimbriata is a European species parasitizing Stereum rugosum on broadleaf trees. Its fruitbodies are comparatively small and dark brown to black. Phaeotremella eugeniae is a temperate Asian counterpart.

== Habitat and distribution ==
Phaeotremella foliacea is a parasite of Stereum sanguinolentum, growing on the host's hyphae in the wood rather than on the host's fruit bodies. Following its hosts, fruit bodies of P. foliacea are typically found on dead, attached or recently fallen branches of conifers.

The species is known from North America, Europe, and northern Asia.

== Edibility ==
The species appears to be non-toxic, but is flavorless and mostly comprises water.
