= Phaeotremella roseotincta =

Scientific classification
- Kingdom: Fungi
- Division: Basidiomycota
- Class: Tremellomycetes
- Order: Tremellales
- Family: Phaeotremellaceae
- Genus: Phaeotremella
- Species: P. roseotincta

Binomial name
- Phaeotremella roseotincta (Lloyd) Malysheva (2018)

Synonyms
- Tremella roseotincta Lloyd (1923)

Species of fungus

Phaeotremella roseotincta is a species of fungus in the family Phaeotremellaceae. It produces pinkish to pale pinkish brown, frondose, gelatinous basidiocarps (fruit bodies) and grows on dead attached and recently fallen branches of broad-leaved trees. It was originally described from Japan and has also been recorded from far eastern Russia.

== Description ==
Fruit bodies are gelatinous, pinkish to pale pinkish brown, up to 4 cm (1.5 in) across, and seaweed-like (with branched, undulating fronds). Microscopically, the hyphae are clamped and occur in a dense gelatinous matrix. The basidia are tremelloid (globose to ellipsoid, with oblique to vertical septa), 16 to 20 by 11 to 18 μm. The basidiospores are globose to ellipsoid, smooth, 7 to 10 by 7 to 9 μm.

== Similar species ==
Phaeotremella frondosa is a widespread species parasitizing Stereum hirsutum and other Stereum species on broad-leaved trees. It produces brown to pale brown fruit bodies without pink tints. Phaeotremella fuscosuccinea occurs in eastern Asia, but is darker and grows on conifers.

== Habitat and distribution ==
Like all Phaeotremella species, P. roseotincta is a parasite of other fungi. Its host species is, however, currently unknown. It occurs on broad-leaved trees in north-eastern Asia (Japan and Russia).
