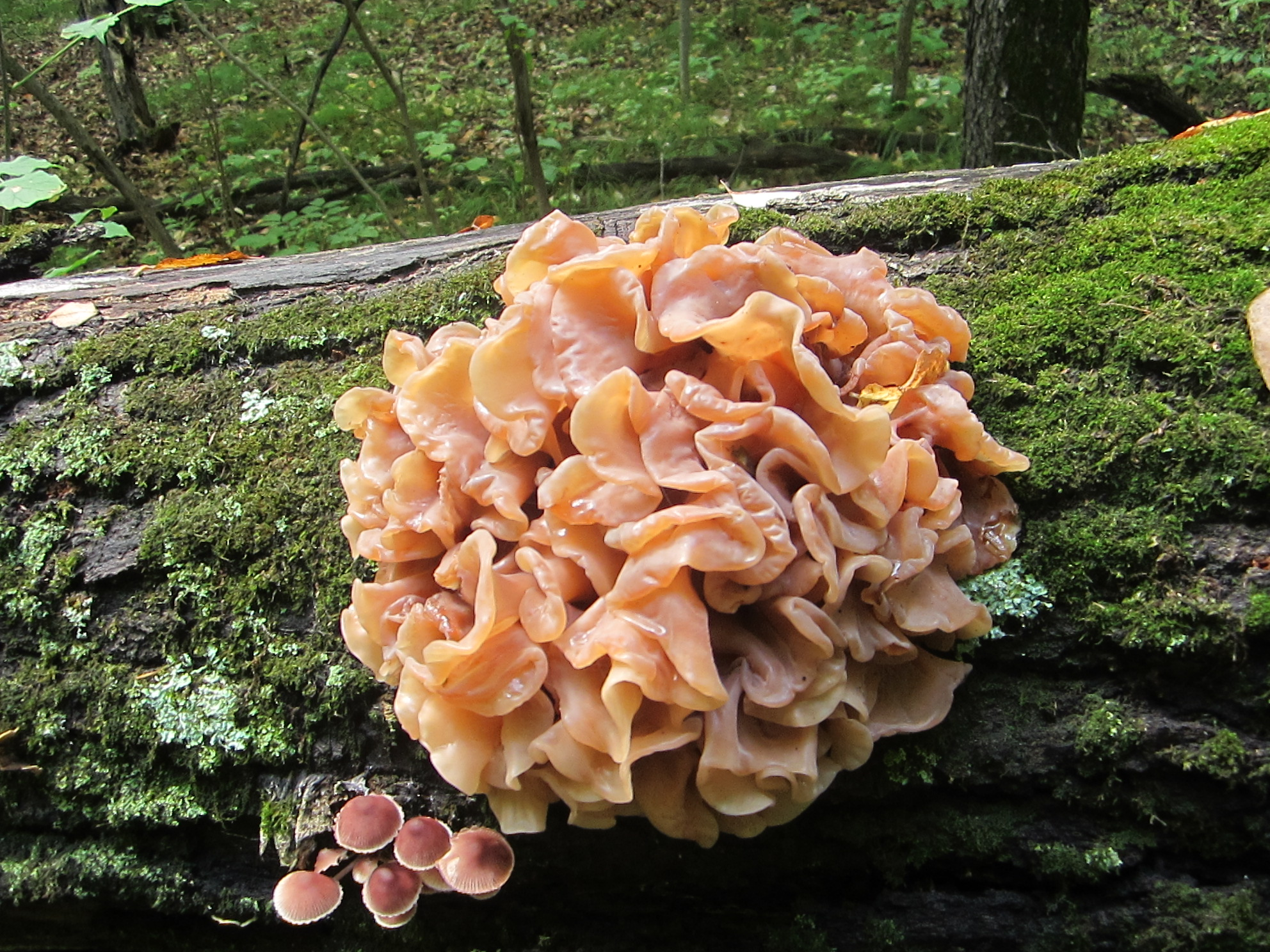
- Gelatinous fruit body of Phaeotremella frondosa

Scientific classification
- Kingdom: Fungi
- Division: Basidiomycota
- Class: Tremellomycetes
- Order: Tremellales
- Family: Phaeotremellaceae
- Genus: Phaeotremella; Rea (1912)

Type species
- Phaeotremella pseudofoliacea Rea

= Phaeotremella =

Genus of fungi

Phaeotremella is a genus of fungi in the family Phaeotremellaceae. All Phaeotremella species are parasites of other fungi and produce anamorphic yeast states. Basidiocarps (fruit bodies), when produced, are gelatinous and are colloquially classed among the "jelly fungi". Fifteen or so species of Phaeotremella are currently recognized worldwide. Tremella sanguinea, shown to be a Phaeotremella species by DNA sequencing, is cultivated in China as an ingredient in traditional Chinese medicine.

== Taxonomy ==
=== History ===
The genus Phaeotremella was originally created by British mycologist Carleton Rea to accommodate Phaeotremella pseudofoliacea, a fungus that resembled a Tremella species but had brown rather than white basidiospores. Later authors considered this to be a mistaken observation and placed Phaeotremella in synonymy with Tremella and its type species in synonymy with Tremella foliacea.

Molecular research, based on cladistic analysis of DNA sequences, has however shown that Tremella is paraphyletic (and hence artificial). A different generic name was therefore required for a group of species not closely related to Tremella mesenterica (the type species of Tremella) and Phaeotremella was selected as the earliest such name available. As a result, the current definition of Phaeotremella is not the same as Rea's original concept. The type species, P. pseudofoliacea, has been placed in synonymy with Phaeotremella frondosa.

== Description ==
Fruit bodies (when present) are gelatinous. In some species they are small (under 5 mm across) and pustular to pulvinate (cushion-shaped). In others they are much larger (up to 150 mm across) and may be variously lobed or foliose (with leaf-like or seaweed-like fronds). Several Phaeotremella species are, however, only known from their yeast states.

=== Microscopic characters ===
Phaeotremella species produce hyphae that are typically (but not always) clamped and have haustorial cells from which hyphal filaments seek out and penetrate the hyphae of the host. The basidia are "tremelloid" (globose to ellipsoid and vertically or diagonally septate), giving rise to long, sinuous sterigmata or epibasidia on which the basidiospores are produced. These spores are smooth, globose to ellipsoid, and germinate by hyphal tube or by yeast cells. Conidiophores are often present, producing conidiospores that are similar to yeast cells.

== Habitat and distribution ==
Most species are parasitic on members of the corticioid fungi, specifically species of Aleurodiscus and Stereum, with one species on the ascomycetous genus Lophodermium. Those on Aleurodiscus, including Phaeotremella mycophaga, parasitize the fruit bodies of their hosts; those on Stereum, such as Phaeotremella foliacea, P. frondosa, and P. fimbriata, parasitize the host mycelium within the wood.

As a group, Phaeotremella species occur worldwide, though individual species may have a more restricted distribution.

== Species and hosts ==
Only species producing basidiocarps (fruit bodies) are listed. Not all hosts are known.

Image	Name	Distribution	Host
	Phaeotremella dejopia	North America	Stereum gausapatum
	Phaeotremella eugeniae	Russian Far East	unknown
	Phaeotremella fimbriata	Europe	Stereum rugosum
	Phaeotremella foliacea	Europe, North America, northern Asia	Stereum sanguinolentum
	Phaeotremella frondosa	Europe, North America, northern Asia	Stereum spp
	Phaeotremella fuscosuccinea	Taiwan, Russian Far East	Stereum sanguinolentum
	Phaeotremella mycetophiloides	Japan	Aleurodiscus amorphus and A. grantii
	Phaeotremella mycophaga	Europe, North America	Aleurodiscus amorphus and A. grantii
	Phaeotremella roseotincta	Japan, Russian Far East	unknown
	Phaeotremella simplex	Europe, North America	Aleurodiscus amorphus and A. thujae
	Phaeotremella translucens	Europe, North America, Japan, New Zealand	Lophodermium species
