= Aleurodiscus berggrenii =

- Aleurodiscus berggrenii in Lower Hutt

Scientific classification
- Kingdom: Fungi
- Division: Basidiomycota
- Class: Agaricomycetes
- Order: Russulales
- Family: Stereaceae
- Genus: Aleurodiscus
- Species: A. berggrenii

Binomial name
- Aleurodiscus berggrenii (Cooke) G. Cunn.

Species of fungi

Aleurodiscus berggrenii is a species of fungus which grows on southern beech trees. It is endemic to New Zealand.

It is found growing in crowded groups on the branches of dead trees, on top of the bark.

== Description ==
It has two forms or stages. The first features small cream or ochre caps, scattered or crowded together. In the second stage separate segments come together to form large patches, deeply creviced with a rough surface and discoloured (often black) edges. These patches resemble one fungi with an irregular polygonal pattern. The mature form resembles Xylobolus frustulatus and may be confused with it.

It is an annual, though it the older form may often last two years.

== Distribution ==
It is found in both the South and North Island. The type specimen is from Maungatua, Otago.

It is only found on four species of southern beech.
