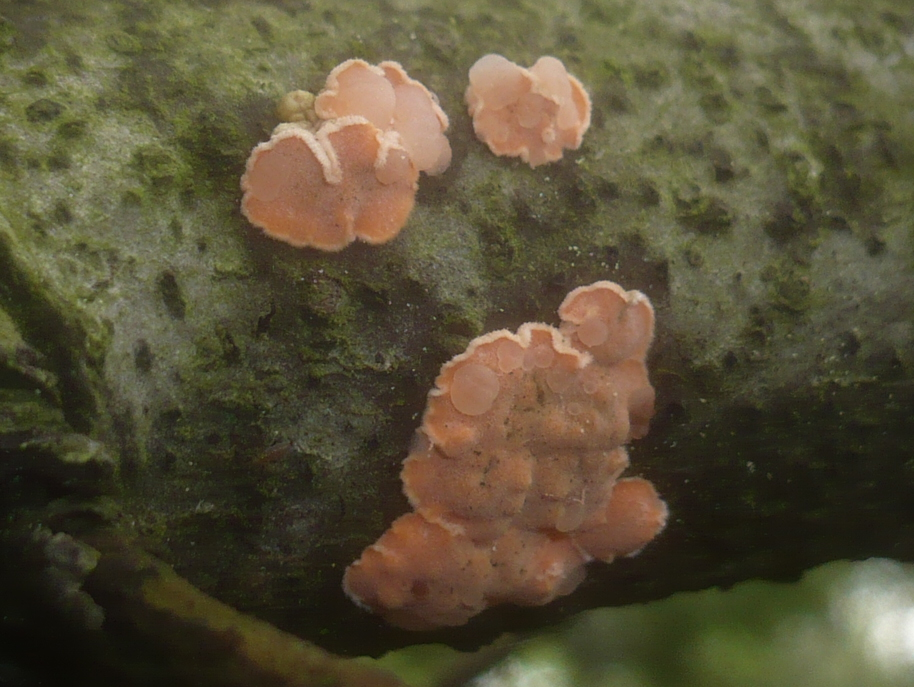
- Phaeotremella mycophaga on basidiocarps of Aleurodiscus amorphus

Scientific classification
- Kingdom: Fungi
- Division: Basidiomycota
- Class: Tremellomycetes
- Order: Tremellales
- Family: Phaeotremellaceae
- Genus: Phaeotremella
- Species: P. mycophaga

Binomial name
- Phaeotremella mycophaga (G.W. Martin) Millanes & Wedin (2015)

Synonyms
- Tremella mycophaga G.W. Martin (1940)

= Phaeotremella mycophaga =

Species of fungus

Phaeotremella mycophaga is a species of fungus in the family Phaeotremellaceae. It produces small, pustular, gelatinous basidiocarps (fruit bodies) on the hymenium of the corticioid fungi Aleurodiscus amorphus and A. grantii on conifers.

== Description ==
Fruit bodies are gelatinous, hyaline to pinkish, up to 1.5 mm (0.05 in) across, and disc-like to pustular, sometimes coalescing. Microscopically, the hyphae are clamped and occur in a dense gelatinous matrix. The basidia are tremelloid (globose, with vertical septa), 13 to 15 μm across. The basidiospores are globose, smooth, 6.5 to 8.0 μm across.

== Similar species ==
Phaeotremella simplex occurs on the same hosts and is indistinguishable in the field, but lacks clamp connections. Phaeotremella mycetophiloides is also similar, but was originally described from Japan. It may represent an earlier name for P. mycophaga.

== Habitat and distribution ==
Phaeotremella mycophaga parasitizes the corticioid fungi Aleurodiscus amorphus and A. grantii, both of which occur on dead attached wood of conifers. The species was originally described from Canada, but has been found elsewhere in North America and in continental Europe.
