= Phaeotremella eugeniae =

Scientific classification
- Kingdom: Fungi
- Division: Basidiomycota
- Class: Tremellomycetes
- Order: Tremellales
- Family: Phaeotremellaceae
- Genus: Phaeotremella
- Species: P. eugeniae

Binomial name
- Phaeotremella eugeniae Malysheva (2018)

Species of fungus

Phaeotremella eugeniae is a species of fungus in the family Phaeotremellaceae. It produces blackish brown, frondose, gelatinous basidiocarps (fruit bodies) and grows on dead attached and recently fallen branches of oak. It was originally described from far eastern Russia and named after Russian mycologist Eugenia Bulakh.

== Description ==
Fruit bodies are gelatinous, blackish brown with rusty tints, drying black, up to 5 cm (2 in) across, and seaweed-like (with branched, undulating fronds). Microscopically, the hyphae are clamped and occur in a dense gelatinous matrix. The basidia are tremelloid (subglobose to ellipsoid, with oblique to vertical septa), 10 to 19 by 7 to 10 μm. The basidiospores are subglobose to ellipsoid, smooth, 6.5 to 8.5 by 5 to 6.5 μm.

== Similar species ==
Phaeotremella frondosa is a widespread species parasitizing Stereum hirsutum and other Stereum species on broad-leaved trees. It produces brown to pale brown fruit bodies. Phaeotremella fuscosuccinea occurs in eastern Asia, but grows on conifers.

== Habitat and distribution ==
Like all Phaeotremella species, P. eugeniae is a parasite of other fungi. Its host species is, however, currently unknown. It occurs on Quercus mongolica in the Russian Far East.
