= Acanthophysellum =

Scientific classification
- Kingdom: Fungi
- Division: Basidiomycota
- Class: Agaricomycetes
- Order: Russulales
- Family: Stereaceae
- Genus: Acanthophysellum; Parmasto

Genus of fungi

Acanthophysellum is a genus of fungus belonging to the family Stereaceae.

The genus was first described by Erast Parmasto in 1967.

The species of this genus are found in Eurasia and Northern America.

Species:

- Acanthophysellum bertii (Lloyd) Sheng H.Wu, Boidin & C.Y.Chien
- Acanthophysellum lividocoeruleum (P.Karst.) Parmasto
