= Tremella olens =

Scientific classification
- Kingdom: Fungi
- Division: Basidiomycota
- Class: Tremellomycetes
- Order: Tremellales
- Family: Tremellaceae
- Genus: Tremella
- Species: T. olens

Binomial name
- Tremella olens Berk. (1860)

Species of fungus

Tremella olens is a species of fungus in the family Tremellaceae. It produces soft, whitish, lobed to frondose, gelatinous basidiocarps (fruit bodies) and is parasitic on other fungi on dead branches of broad-leaved trees. It was originally described from Tasmania.

== Taxonomy ==
Tremella olens was first published in 1860 by British mycologist Miles Joseph Berkeley based on a collection made in Tasmania.

== Description ==
Fruit bodies are soft, gelatinous, whitish, and lobed. Microscopically, the basidia are tremelloid (ellipsoid, with oblique to vertical septa), 4-celled. The basidiospores are ellipsoid, smooth, 7.5 to 8.5 by 5.5 to 6.5 μm.

== Similar species ==
Tremella olens belongs to a complex of similar species that have been differentiated by DNA sequencing and minor microscopic features. Tremella fibulifera and T. subfibulifera were both originally described from Brazil; Tremella neofibulifera and T. lloydiae-candidae were originally described from Japan; Tremella australe, T. cheejenii, T. guangxiensis, and T. latispora were originally described from China.

Tremella fuciformis is a white species also recorded from Australia, but fruit bodies have thin, erect fronds, often crisped at the edges.

== Habitat and distribution ==
Tremella olens is a parasite on lignicolous fungi, but its host species is unknown. It is found on dead, attached or fallen branches of broad-leaved trees.

The species was originally described from Tasmania and has also been reported from Christmas Island. Reports from Venezuela and Jamaica refer to the South American species T. fibulifera or T. subfibulifera. Reports from Cameroon and Sabah belong to the species complex, but which species is uncertain.
