= Tremella fibulifera =

Scientific classification
- Kingdom: Fungi
- Division: Basidiomycota
- Class: Tremellomycetes
- Order: Tremellales
- Family: Tremellaceae
- Genus: Tremella
- Species: T. fibulifera

Binomial name
- Tremella fibulifera Möller (1895)

Species of fungus

Tremella fibulifera is a species of fungus in the family Tremellaceae. It produces soft, whitish, lobed to frondose, gelatinous basidiocarps (fruit bodies) and is parasitic on other fungi on dead branches of broad-leaved trees. It was originally described from Brazil.

== Taxonomy ==
Tremella fibulifera was first published in 1895 by German mycologist Alfred Möller based on a collection made in Brazil.

== Description ==
Fruit bodies are soft, gelatinous, whitish, up to 2.5 cm (1 in) across, and lobed. Microscopically, the basidia are tremelloid (subglobose, with oblique to vertical septa), 4-celled, 13 to 18 by 9 to 16 μm. The basidiospores are ellipsoid, smooth, 7 to 10 by 6 to 7 μm.

== Similar species ==
Tremella subfibulifera, also described from Brazil, appears macroscopically identical but differs microscopically in having slightly smaller basidiospores (5.5 to 10 by 4 to 6 μm). DNA sequencing has shown that it is a distinct species. Several other species, including Tremella olens and Tremella neofibulifera, are macroscopically similar and belong within the T. fibulifera complex, but occur in Asia or Australia.

== Habitat and distribution ==
Tremella fibulifera is a parasite on lignicolous fungi, but its host species is unknown, though collections have been noted on pyrenomycetes. It is found on dead, attached or fallen branches of broad-leaved trees.

The species is currently known from Brazil, Colombia, Costa Rica, Panama, Venezuela (as T. olens), and Jamaica (as T. olens).
