= X. princeps =

X. princeps may refer to:

- Xerus princeps, the mountain ground squirrel, the Kaoko ground squirrel or the Damara ground squirrel, a rodent species native to southwestern Angola, western Namibia and western South Africa
- Xylobolus princeps, a fungus species in the genus Xylobolus
