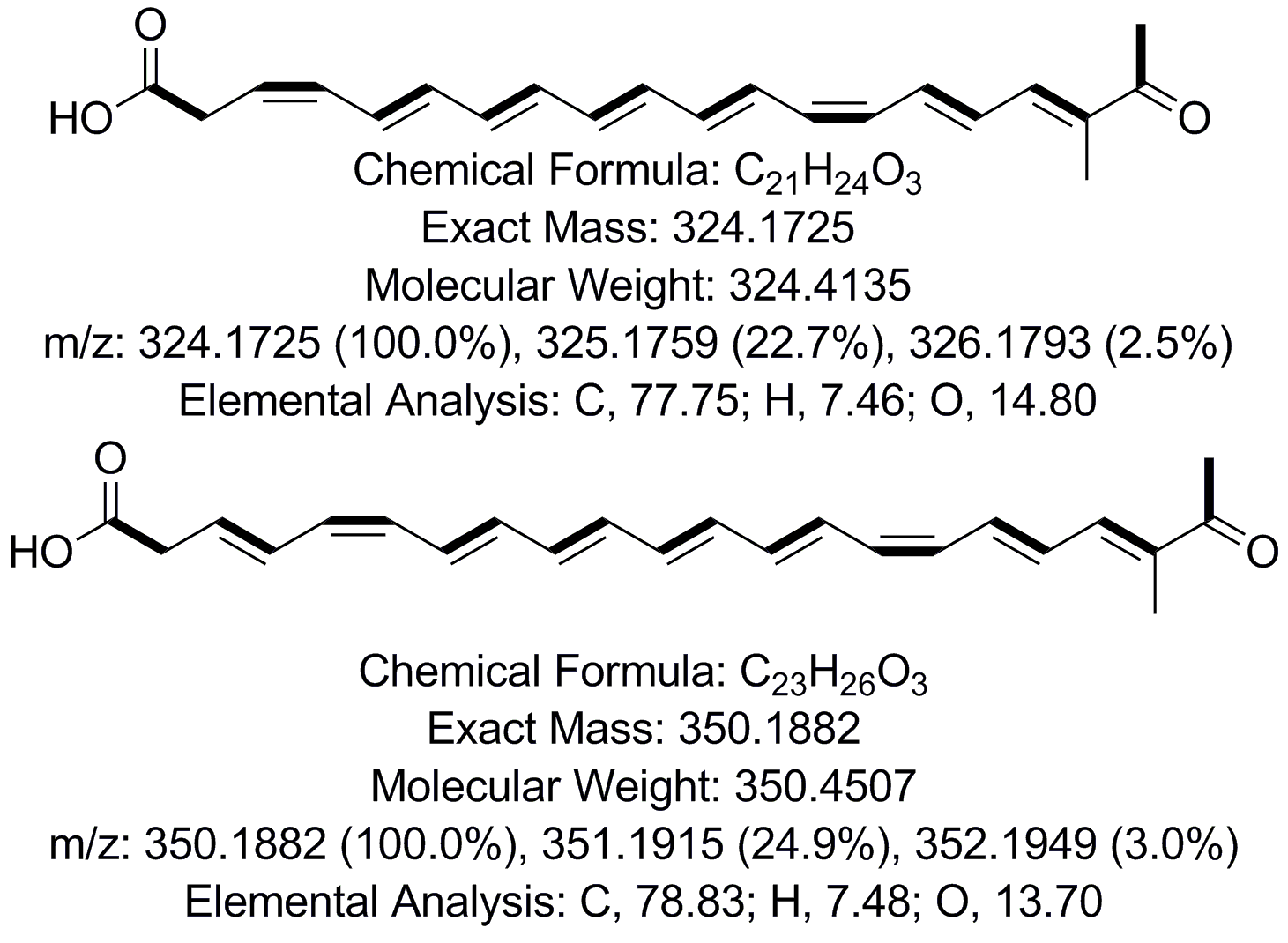
- diagrams of the structure of two polyenes formed by BY1

Scientific classification
- Kingdom: Fungi
- Division: Basidiomycota
- Class: Agaricomycetes
- Order: Russulales
- Family: Stereaceae
- Genus: incertae sedis
- Species: BY1

Binomial name
- BY1

Synonyms
- Fungus BY1

= BY1 =

Species of fungus

BY1 is a taxonomically unidentified basidiomycete fungus. ITS sequencing has placed it in the Russulales and is referred to as a stereaceous basidiomycete. Chemotaxonomically supporting its placement in this group, it produces fomannoxins and vibralactones. The fungus' mycelia were isolated from dead aspen in Minnesota, USA. It is presumed to decompose wood by white rot.

The mycelium can be grown on YMG agar at room temperature (4 g/L d-glucose, 4 g/L yeast extract, 10 g/L malt extract, 18 g/L agar). The culture can be obtained at the Jena Microbial Resource Collection registration number SF:011241.

When the mycelia is wounded by scalpel damage, a yellow pigment appears. These pigments were identified as polyenes by characteristic UV-Vis spectra. The structures of the polyenes were determined by NMR. They were identified as 1) (3Z,5E,7E,9E,11E,13Z,15E,17E)-18-methyl-19-oxoicosa-3,5,7,9,11,13,15,17-octaenoic acid; and 2) (3E,5Z,7E,9E,11E,13E,15Z,17E,19E)-20-methyl-21-oxodocosa-3,5,7,9,11,13,15,17,19-nonaenoic acid. The shorter polyene was found to be highly toxic against Drosophila melanogaster larvae. Feeding experiments with [1-13C]acetate revealed a polyketidic origin, and feeding experiments with l-[methyl-13C]methionine revealed methyl branching likely via S-adenosyl-l-methionine-dependent methyltransferase(s). Additionally, MALDI-TOF imaging at the mycelial wounding site identified these poylenes as localized at the wounded area. Two putative alleles of polyketide genes were identified, referred to as PPS1 and PPS2. QRT-PCR monitoring of PPS1 showed up-regulation of this gene after mycelial wounding. The domain architecture was the following for PPS1: KS, AT, DH, MT, KR, ACP, and thus was classified as a highly-reducing polyketide synthase (HR-PKS). This was the first characterized HR-PKS of basidiomycetic origin and forms its own clade in comparison to ascomycete HR-PKSs, bacterial polyene-forming PKSs, basidiomycete non-reducing PKSs, and ascomycete non-reducing PKSs. This research was highlighted in the media several times.

The fungus also produces fomannoxins and vibralactones. The famonnixins were found to be phytotoxic and the vibralactones were found to be antifungal.

Additionally, a new prenylphenol, termed cloquetin, was identified from the fungus by NMR. Overexpression of two annotated non-reducing polyketide synthases (PKS1 and PKS2) in Aspergillus niger and subsequent characterization of the proteins identified them as orsellinic acid synthases. A prenyltransferase gene, termed BYPB, was overexpressed in E. coli and the subsequent protein was confirmed to add a prenyl group to orsellinic acid.
