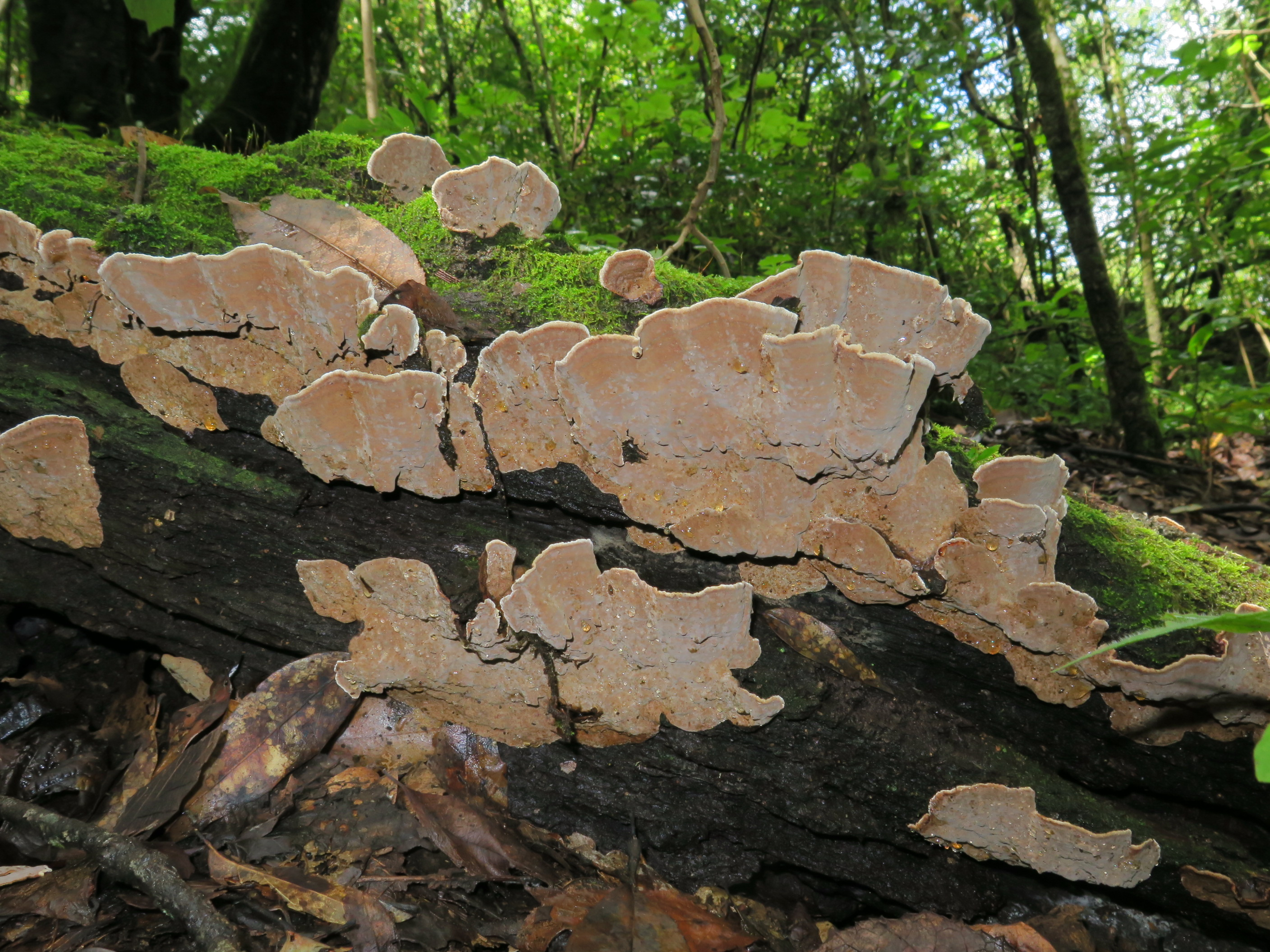
- Underside of Xylobolus subpileatus fruit bodies, growing on oak

Scientific classification
- Domain: Eukaryota
- Kingdom: Fungi
- Division: Basidiomycota
- Class: Agaricomycetes
- Order: Russulales
- Family: Stereaceae
- Genus: Xylobolus
- Species: X. subpileatus

Binomial name
- Xylobolus subpileatus (Berk. & M.A.Curtis) Boidin (1958)

Synonyms
- List: Stereum subpileatum Berk. & M.A.Curtis (1849); Stereum scytale Berk. (1854); Lloydella subpileata (Berk. & M.A.Curtis) Höhn. & Litsch. (1907); Stereum insigne Bres. (1891); Hymenochaete tjibodensis Henn. (1900); Stereum sepium Burt (1920); Stereum sepiaceum Burt (1920); Lloydella sepia (Burt) S.Ito (1955); Lloydella sepiacea (Burt) S.Ito (1955); Stereum frustulatum var. subpileatum (Berk. & M.A.Curtis) A.L.Welden (1971)

= Xylobolus subpileatus =

Species of crust fungus

Xylobolus subpileatus is a species of crust fungus in the family Stereaceae first described in 1849 by Miles Joseph Berkeley and Moses Ashley Curtis. The fungus forms tough, crust-like fruit bodies with somewhat flat to wavy caps that feature a dark zonate top and light underside, typically growing on fallen oak logs. It creates a distinctive honeycomb-like decay pattern by selectively degrading lignin in the wood, with fruiting bodies appearing more frequently as the wood advances through decay. Though widely distributed across North America, Europe, Asia, and South America, X. subpileatus is considered endangered in several European countries, where it is often confined to old-growth oak forests.

== Taxonomy ==
The fungus was first described scientifically in 1849 by Miles Joseph Berkeley and Moses Ashley Curtis, who considered the fungus a species of Stereum closely related to but distinct from Stereum rugosum. The original collections were made from specimens growing on dead trunks in the United States of Ohio and South Carolina. Xylobolus subpileatus was given its current name by French mycologist Jacques Boidin when he transferred it to the genus Xylobolus in 1958.

== Description ==
The caps are somewhat flat to wavy, with a dark zonate top and light underside. They are 2–20 centimetres (1–8 in) wide and 1–3.5 cm (1/2–1 1/2 in) deep. The wood-inhabiting stereoid fruit bodies form tough, crust-like basidiomes that adhere closely to the substrate, typically developing as effused patches or with reflexed margins on fallen oak logs. Basidiomes often occur adjacent to a characteristic honeycomb-like decay pattern—resulting from selective lignin degradation that leaves medullary ray parenchyma and early-wood vessels intact between pockets of degraded material.

=== Similar species ===
Lookalikes include some within the same genus, as well as Cerioporus mollis, Dentocorticium portoricense, and Hymenochaete rubiginosa.

== Habitat and distribution ==
Xylobolus subpileatus is a saproxylic wood-decay fungus that colonises fallen oakwood, producing its characteristic honeycomb-like decay patterns by selectively degrading lignin. Fruiting bodies appear only on logs of Quercus species, with the likelihood of basidiome formation rising as the wood advances through decay; in old-growth oak forests in Corsica, for example, fruiting probability increases steadily from around 7 years after treefall to peak at roughly 40 years within natural canopy gaps, where deep shade and stable microclimates prevail.

Geographically, X. subpileatus has been recorded from at least 14 countries across North America, Europe, Asia and South America, although it is absent from Africa and Antarctica. In eastern North America it is known from mature deciduous forests on fallen oak logs, while in Europe its populations are often scarce and highly localised; several countries list it as endangered (e.g. Austria, Hungary) or critically endangered (Czech Republic). In the Mediterranean basin, occurrences are confined to old-growth Quercus ilex stands on Corsica, where fruiting is restricted to logs in advanced stages of decay within dated canopy gaps.
