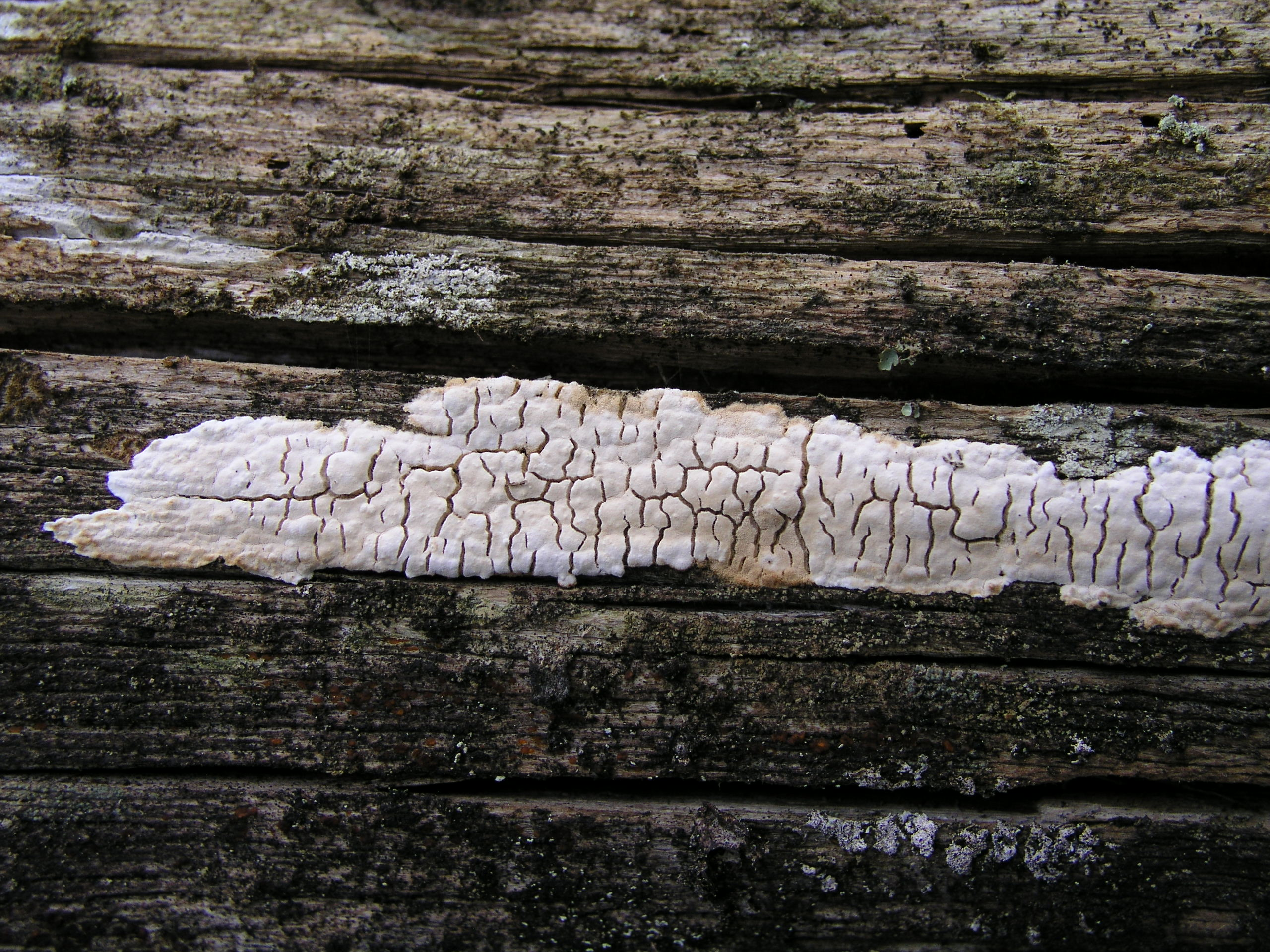

Scientific classification
- Kingdom: Fungi
- Division: Basidiomycota
- Class: Agaricomycetes
- Order: Russulales
- Family: Stereaceae
- Genus: Chaetoderma
- Species: C. luna

Binomial name
- Chaetoderma luna (Romell ex D.P. Rogers & H.S. Jacks.) Parmasto, 1968

= Chaetoderma luna =

Species of fungus

Chaetoderma luna is a species of fungus belonging to the family Stereaceae.

Synonyms:

- Peniophora luna Romell ex D.P.Rogers & H.S.Jacks., 1943 (= basionym)
- Chaetodermella luna (Romell ex D.P.Rogers & H.S.Jacks.) Rauschert, 1988
