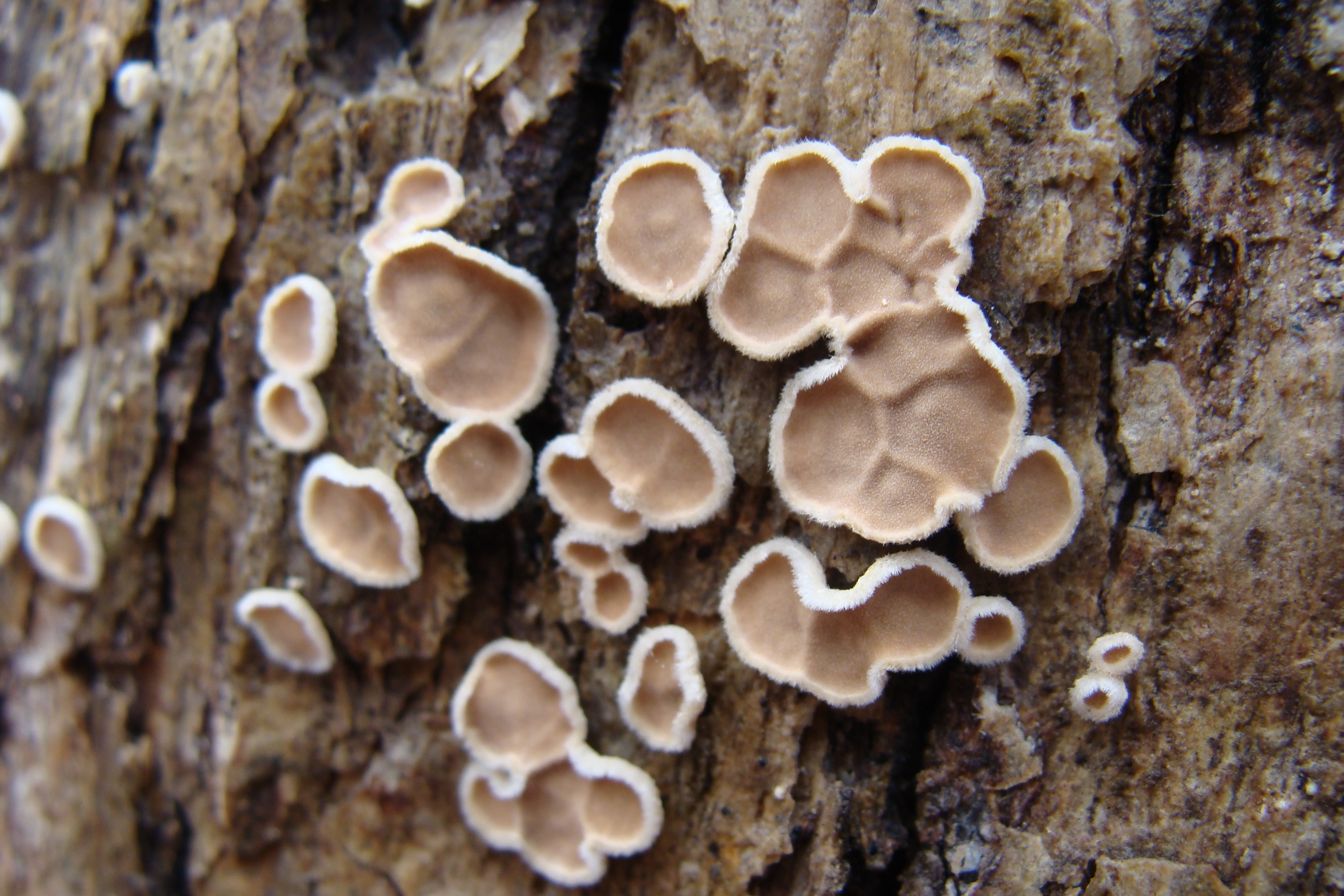

Scientific classification
- Kingdom: Fungi
- Division: Basidiomycota
- Class: Agaricomycetes
- Order: Russulales
- Family: Stereaceae
- Genus: Aleurodiscus
- Species: A. oakesii

Binomial name
- Aleurodiscus oakesii (Berk.:M.A.Curtis) Pat. (1890)

= Aleurodiscus oakesii =

Species of fungus

Aleurodiscus oakesii
- Mycological characteristics
- Smooth hymenium
- Cap is depressed
- Hymenium attachment is irregular or not applicable
- Lacks a stipe
- Spore print is cream
- Ecology is saprotrophic
- Edibility is inedible

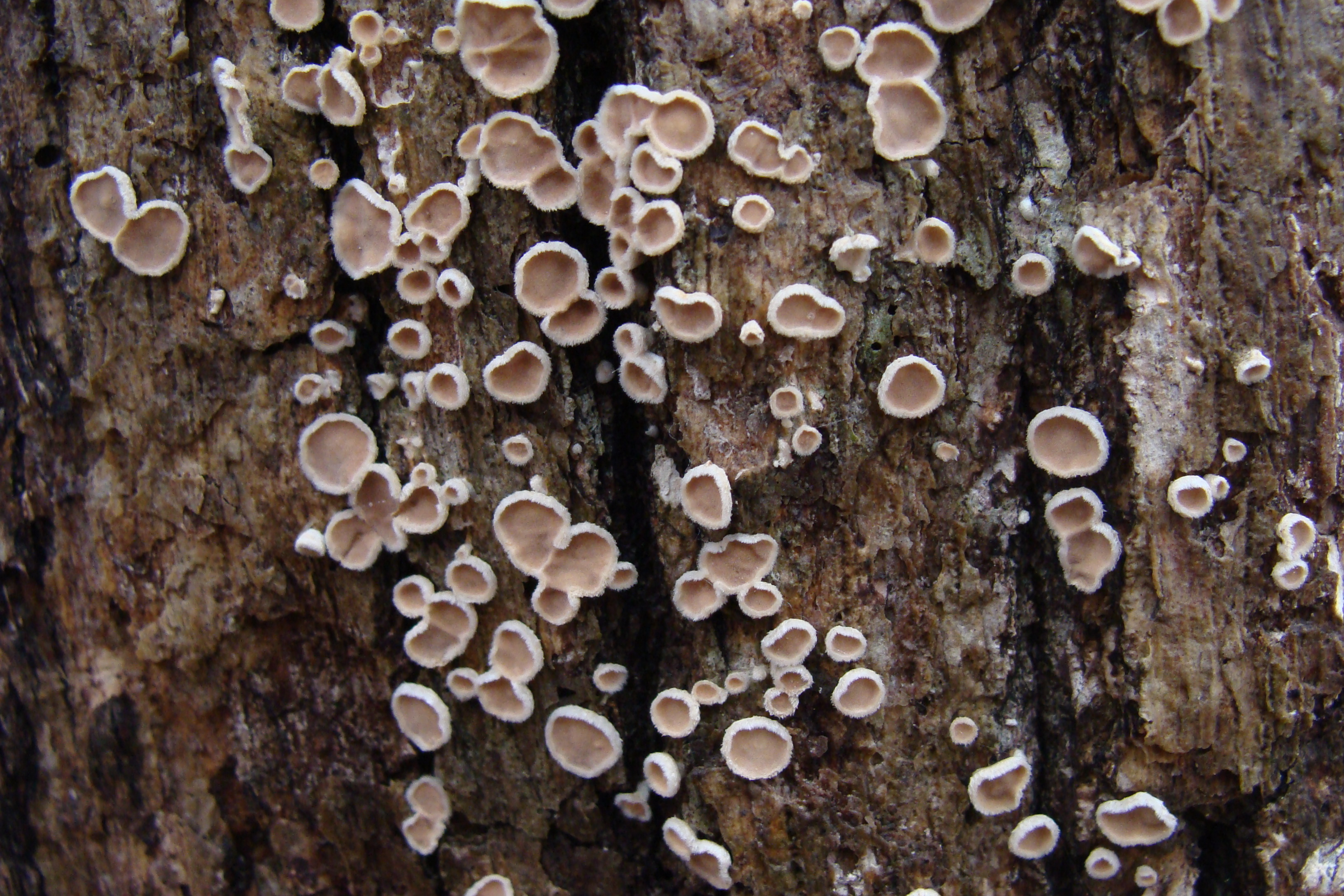
Aleurodiscus oakesii on white oak bark, found in Illinois, US

Aleurodiscus oakesii is a cluster of small, gray-white, irregular cup-shaped saprotrophic fungi that grows on decaying hardwood tree bark. This fungus may also be called hophornbeam discs, and it causes smooth patch disease. A. oakesii is found year round in North America, Europe, and Asia and is commonly found on oak trees.

== Taxonomy ==
Aleurodiscus oakesii is a species of fungus in the family Stereaceae. The species was first described by Miles Joseph Berkeley and Moses Ashley Curtis in 1873 as Corticium oakesii. Mordecai Cubitt Cooke first proposed the designation Aleurodiscus oakesii in 1875 as a nomen nudum, and the first accepted mention using the new designation was by Narcisse Théophile Patouillard in 1890. The specific epithet both honors English botanist William Oakes and references the fungi's tendency to colonize oak trees.

== Description ==
Aleurodiscus oakesii produces clusters of gray or cream-colored, flat, crustlike, fruiting bodies, usually less than a centimeter in diameter, though larger sizes may result from the combination of adjacent bodies. The inner, fertile space of the cup-like fruiting bodies is darker in color in comparison to the sterile outer surface. The spore-bearing bodies are tough in texture and attached to the bark by a single point, but the fungi lacks a stipe. The edges of the fruiting bodies are raised and may be confused for cup-shaped Ascomycete fungus. A. oakesii grows best on thinner sections of bark, with the stromata formed beneath the top bark layer and enlarging cracks in the bark with growth of fungal hyphae that then form the cup-like structure. Microscopically, A. oakesii has septate hyphae and antler-like acanthophyses. Basidiospores are oval or egg-shaped and relatively small in comparison to species of the same genus, and the spores of this species have spines and warts.

== Habitat and distribution ==
Found across North America, Europe, and Asia, most commonly in the North Eastern United States, most commonly found in spring and fall but grows year round. It colonizes the outer bark of trees, especially white oaks, and eventually digests it, causing the "smooth patch disease" the fungus is most well known for. A. oakesii grows commonly on hardwood trees of the genus Ostrya and is less commonly found on leafier trees.

== Pathology ==
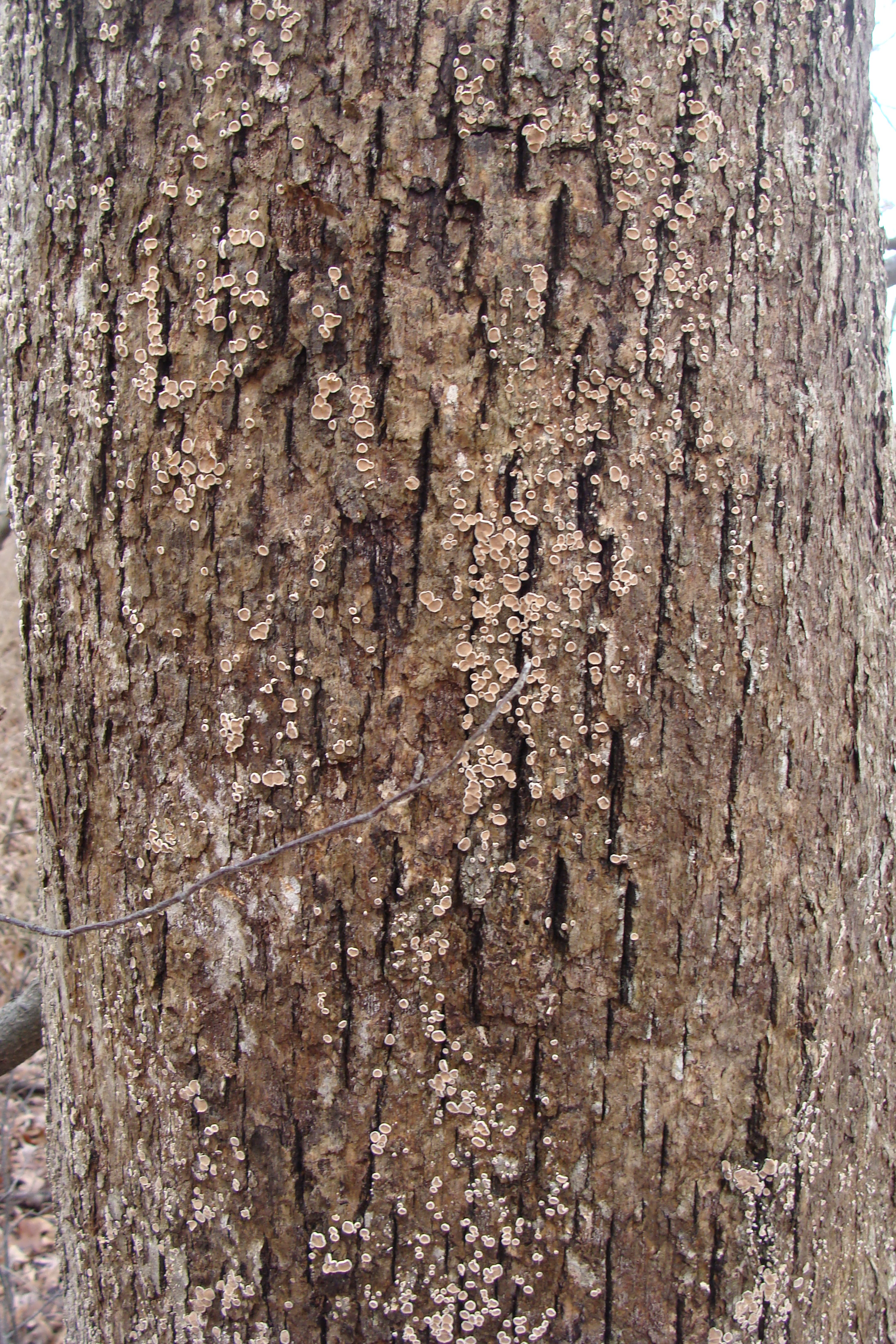
Aleurodiscus oakesii on tree bark

Aleurodiscus oakesii is the most common fungi to cause “smooth patch disease” on the nonliving outer bark of trees. This fungal infection can lead to trees shedding and leaving smooth and lighter patches of bark on the tree, giving “smooth patch” its meaning. These patches can vary from a few inches to a foot or more in diameter. Fungal infection usually occurs during the growing season of hardwood trees, mainly many species of oaks, but can grow year round. Other names for smooth patch disease include white patch, smooth bark, bark rot, and bark patch.

Unlike wood-decay fungi, A. oakesii is not a parasite because does not saprotrophically colonize the tree itself, only the bark. As a result, it does not directly harm the living tree. However, due to a decrease of bark thickness, smooth patch disease may decrease protection of the bark against many factors such as wood decay fungi, dehydration, or injury.
