= Aleurodiscus lividocoeruleus =

Scientific classification
- Kingdom: Fungi
- Division: Basidiomycota
- Class: Agaricomycetes
- Order: Russulales
- Family: Stereaceae
- Genus: Aleurodiscus
- Species: A. lividocoeruleus

Binomial name
- Aleurodiscus lividocoeruleus (P.Karst.) P.A.Lemke, 1964

Species of fungus

Aleurodiscus lividocoeruleus is a species of fungus belonging to the family Stereaceae.

It is native to Europe and Northern America.

Synonyms:

- Acanthophysellum lividocoeruleum (P.Karst.) Parmasto
