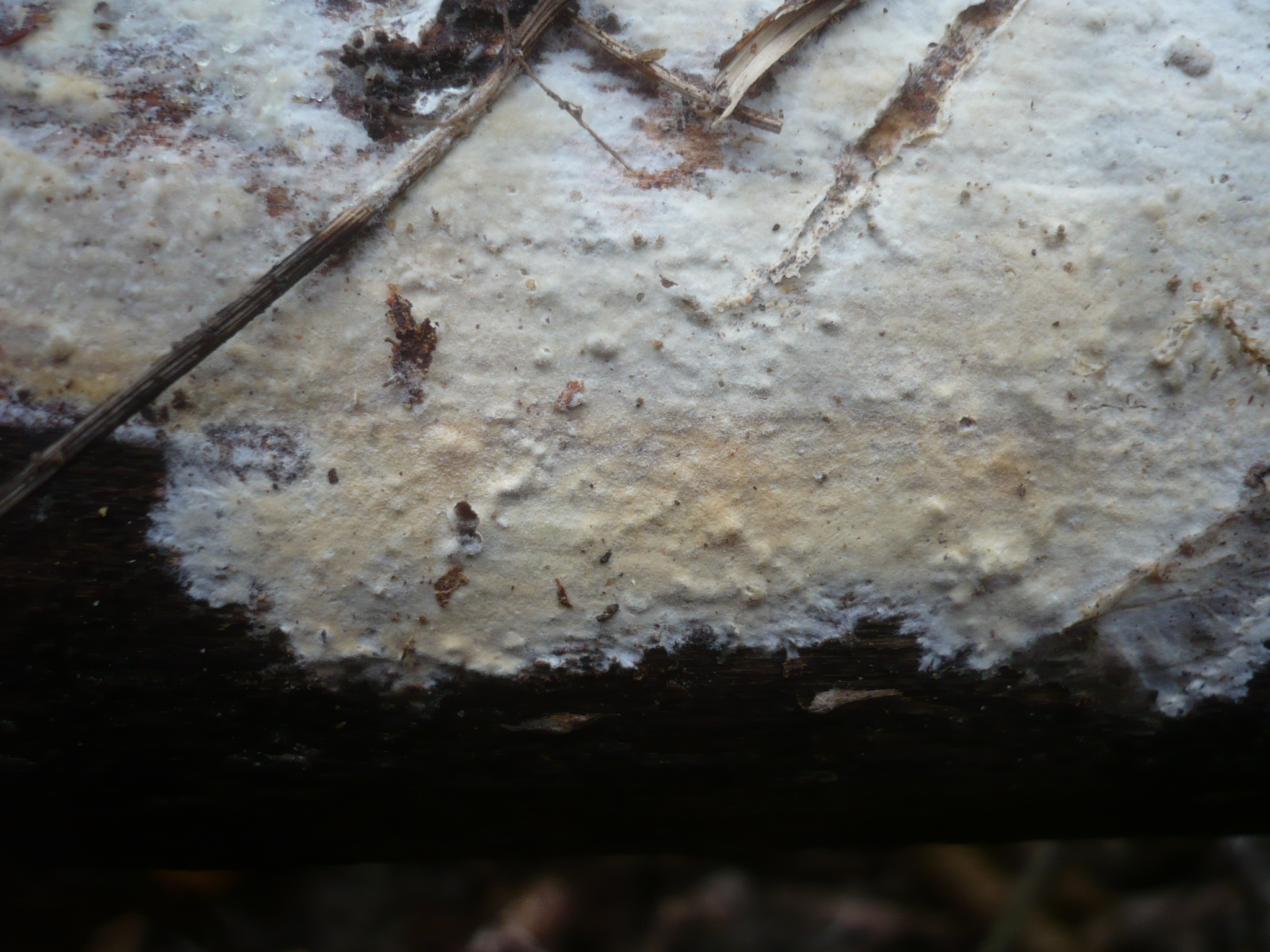
- Scytinostromella heterogenea

Scientific classification
- Kingdom: Fungi
- Division: Basidiomycota
- Class: Agaricomycetes
- Order: Russulales
- Family: Stereaceae
- Genus: Scytinostromella; Parmasto (1968)

Type species
- Peniophora heterogenea Bourdot & Galzin (1912)

Species
- S. arachnoideum; S. heterogenea; S. humifaciens; S. nannfeldtii; S. olivaceoalba

= Scytinostromella =

Genus of fungi

Scytinostromella is a genus of crust fungi in the Stereaceae family. The widespread genus contains five species. The genus was circumscribed by Estonian mycologist Erast Parmasto in 1968, who set Peniophora heterogenea as the type species. Characteristic features of the genus include dimitic hyphae, spores that are both amyloid and asperulate (roughened by many small points or warts), and the presence of cystidia and rhizomorphic strands.
