= Scotoderma =

Scientific classification
- Kingdom: Fungi
- Division: Basidiomycota
- Class: Agaricomycetes
- Order: Russulales
- Family: Stereaceae
- Genus: Scotoderma; Jülich

Type species
- Scotoderma viride (Berk.) Jülich

Genus of fungi

Scotoderma is a monospecific genus of fungi in the Stereaceae family, containing only the species Scotoderma viride.
