= Amylosporomyces =

Scientific classification
- Kingdom: Fungi
- Division: Basidiomycota
- Class: Agaricomycetes
- Order: Russulales
- Family: Stereaceae
- Genus: Amylosporomyces; S.S. Rattan

Type species
- Amylosporomyces echinosporus S.S. Rattan

Genus of fungi

Amylosporomyces is a genus of fungi in the Stereaceae family.
