= Megalocystidium =

Scientific classification
- Kingdom: Fungi
- Division: Basidiomycota
- Class: Agaricomycetes
- Order: Russulales
- Family: Stereaceae
- Genus: Megalocystidium; Jülich

Type species
- Megalocystidium leucoxanthum (Bres.) Jülich

Genus of fungi

Megalocystidium is a genus of fungi in the Stereaceae family.
