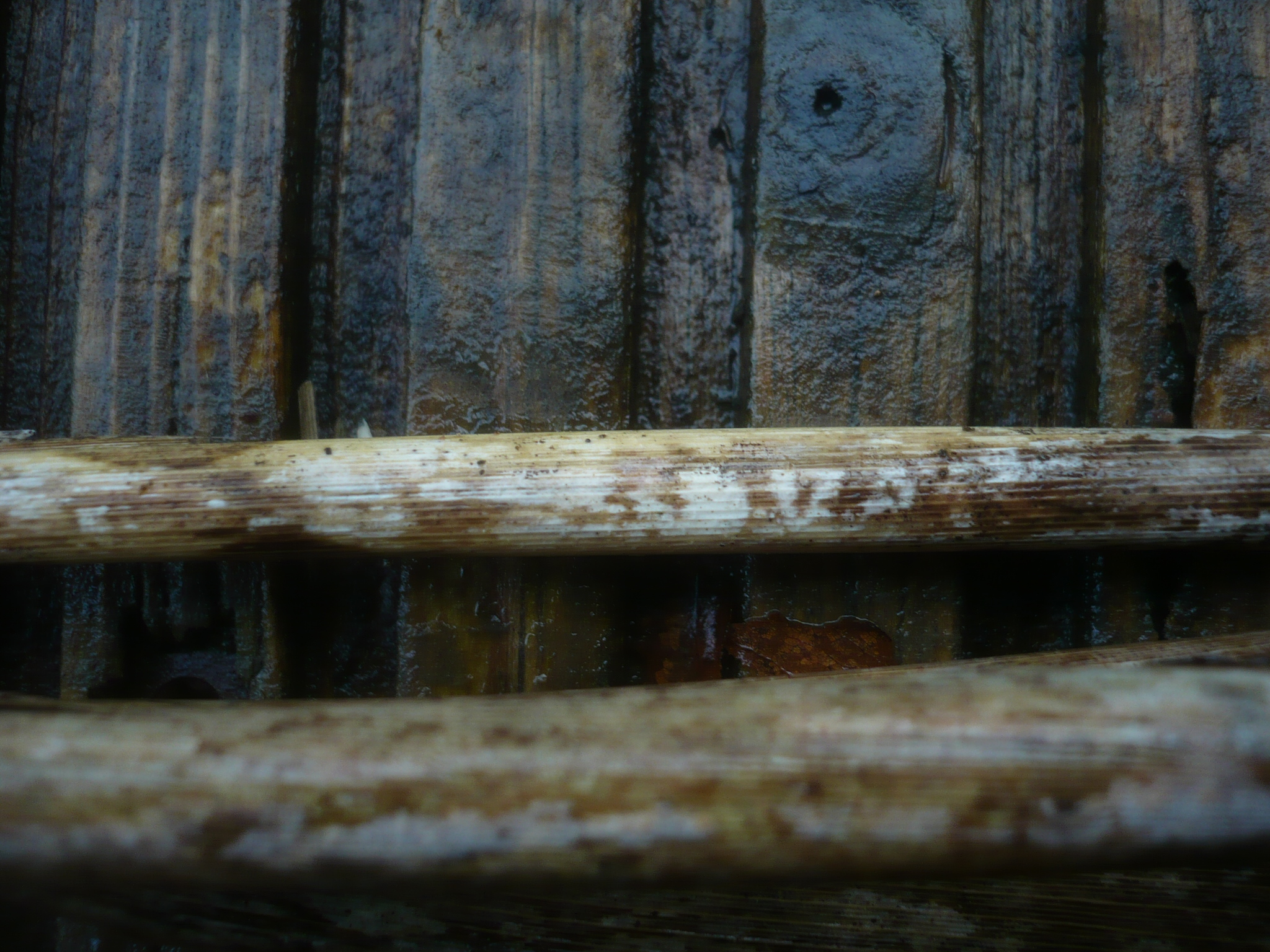
- Acanthobasidium delicatum

Scientific classification
- Kingdom: Fungi
- Division: Basidiomycota
- Class: Agaricomycetes
- Order: Russulales
- Family: Stereaceae
- Genus: Acanthobasidium; Oberw. (1966)

Type species
- Acanthobasidium delicatum (Wakef.) Oberw.

Species
- A. delicatum A. norvegicum A. phragmitis

= Acanthobasidium =

Genus of fungi

Acanthobasidium is a genus of fungi in the Stereaceae family. The genus, which contains three species found in Europe, was circumscribed by mycologist Franz Oberwinkler in 1966.
