= William Oakes (botanist) =

American botanist (1799–1848)

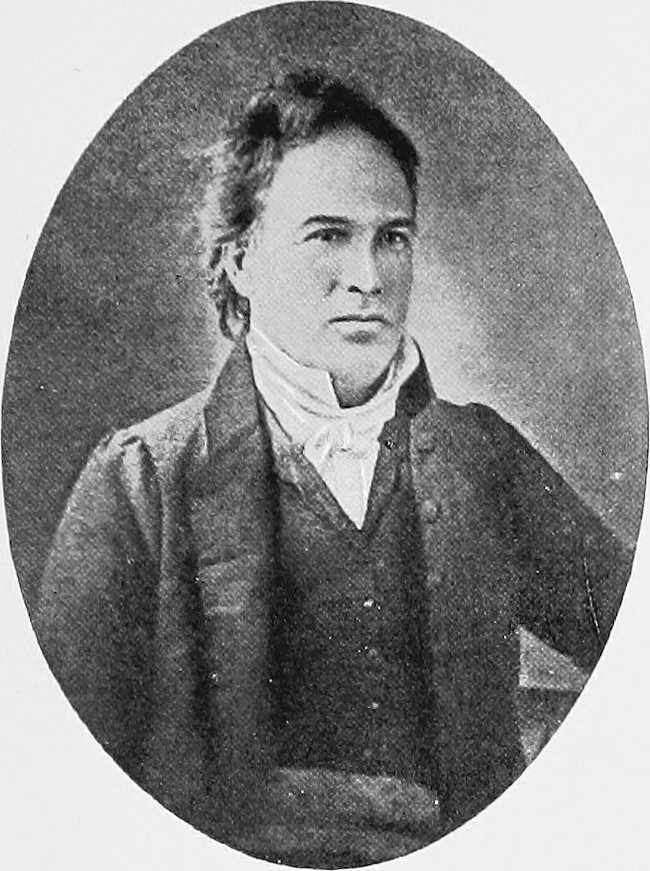
- Born: July 1, 1799
- Died: July 31, 1848 (aged 49)
- Education: Harvard University
- Scientific career
- Author abbrev. (botany): Oakes

William Oakes (July 1, 1799 – July 31, 1848) was an American botanist.

William Oakes was born on July 1, 1799. He attended Harvard from 1816 and developed an interest in natural history under the guidance of his tutor, William Dandridge Peck. After graduation in 1820, Oakes studied law and then, from 1824, began a legal practice in Ipswich, Massachusetts.

Oakes was among the first travelers on a path to the summit of Mount Washington, New Hampshire, that had been constructed in 1821 by the pioneering Ethan Crawford. He came to know Crawford well during his numerous subsequent visits to the White Mountains in which Mount Washington lies. Oakes Gulf in the mountains is named after him.

Oakes eventually gave up law to pursue full-time his interest in natural history. He was asked to contribute a description of White Mountains flora to a geological survey report in 1842 and thereafter spent much time on the project.

Oakes drowned on July 31, 1848, after throwing himself off a ferry running between Boston and East Boston. The fungus Aleurodiscus oakesii was named after him by Miles Berkeley and Moses Curtis, and Potamogeton oakesianus (Oakes' Pondweed) also bears his name. Others include Oenothera oakesiana and Oakesia conradii, which was later renamed Corema conradii.

The writings of Oakes, together with work by Asa Gray, were a significant source for a report produced by George Barrell Emerson in 1846 concerning the trees and shrubs of Massachusetts. The herbarium of the New England Botanical Club holds many specimens collected by Oakes.

The standard author abbreviation Oakes is used to indicate this person as the author when citing a botanical name.
