= Amylohyphus =

Conservation status
- Data Deficient (IUCN 3.1)

Scientific classification
- Kingdom: Fungi
- Division: Basidiomycota
- Class: Agaricomycetes
- Order: Russulales
- Family: Peniophoraceae
- Genus: Amylohyphus; Ryvarden (1978)
- Species: A. africanus

Binomial name
- Amylohyphus africanus Ryvarden (1978)

Genus of fungi

Amylohyphus is a fungal genus in the family Stereaceae. It was circumscribed by Norwegian mycologist Leif Ryvarden in 1978 to contain the single crust fungus Amylohyphus africanus. The fungus, which grows as a thin crust on deciduous wood, has a light brown surface with smooth, yellowish margins. The spores produced by the fungus are cylindrical, thin-walled, and non-amyloid, measuring 12–15 by 5–7 μm. Amylohyphus africanus is found in Rwanda.
