= Acanthophysium =

Scientific classification
- Kingdom: Fungi
- Division: Basidiomycota
- Class: Agaricomycetes
- Order: Russulales
- Family: Stereaceae
- Genus: Acanthophysium (Pilát) G.Cunn. (1963)

Type species
- Acanthophysium apricans (Bourdot) G.Cunn. (1963)

Genus of fungi

Acanthophysium
- Mycological characteristics

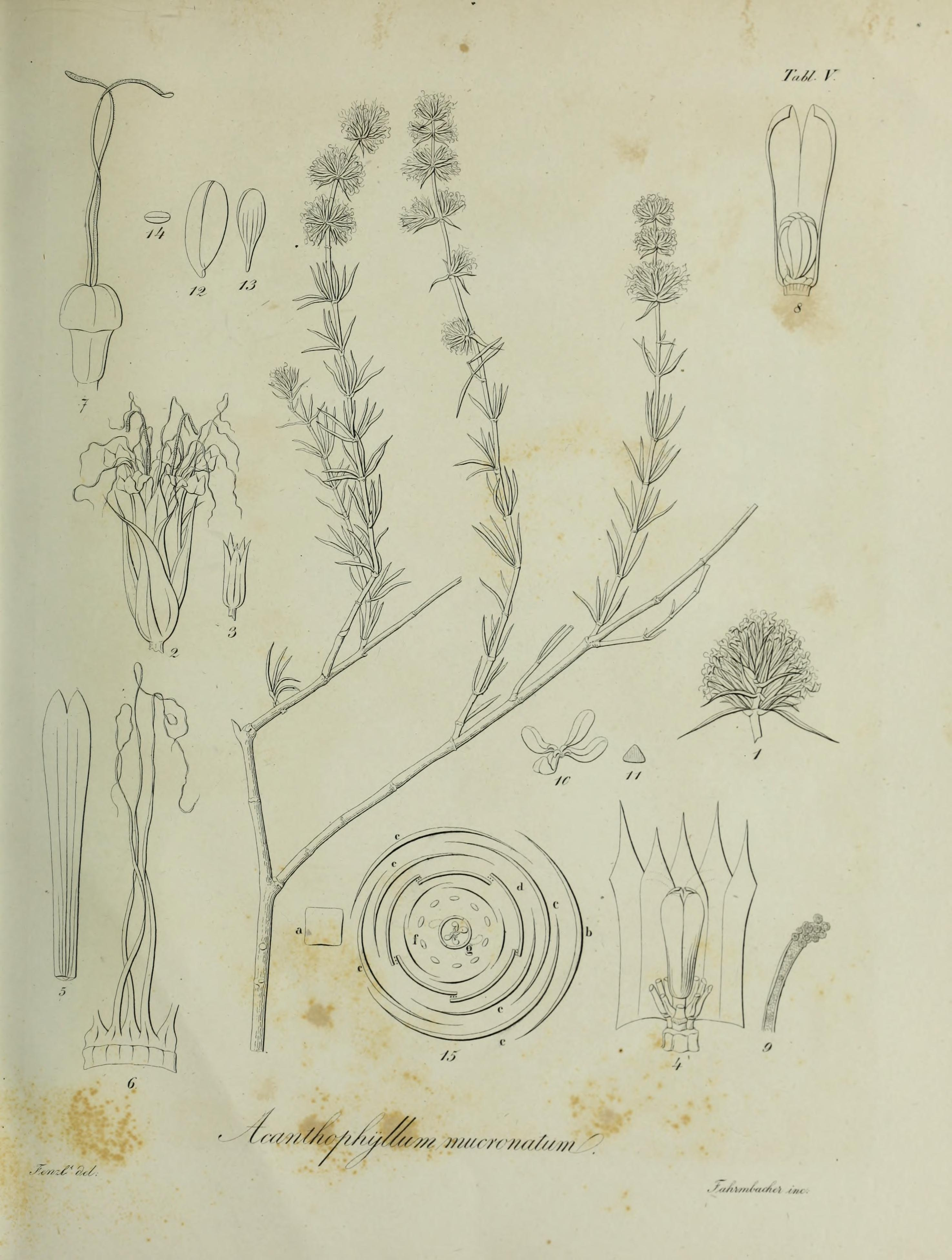
Acanthophyllum mucronatum

Acanthophysium is a genus of fungi in the Stereaceae family. The widespread genus, which contains about 20 species, was circumscribed by New Zealand mycologist Gordon Herriot Cunningham in 1963.

== Species ==
- Acanthophysium apricans
- Acanthophysium bertii
- Acanthophysium bisporum
- Acanthophysium buxicola
- Acanthophysium tsugae
