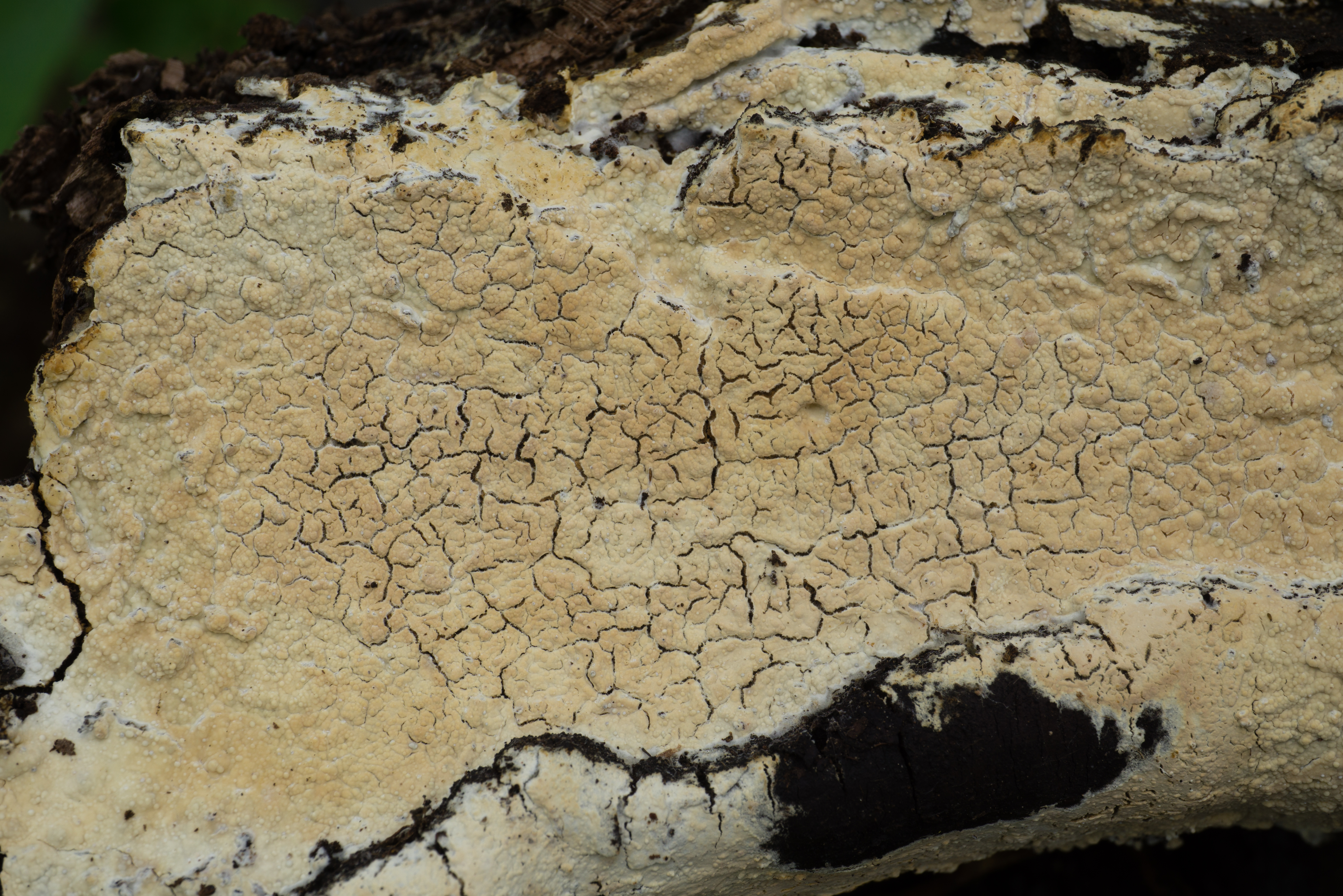
- Conferticium ravum found in Almaden Quicksilver County Park, San Jose, California

Scientific classification
- Kingdom: Fungi
- Division: Basidiomycota
- Class: Agaricomycetes
- Order: Russulales
- Family: Stereaceae
- Genus: Conferticium; Hallenb.

Type species
- Conferticium insidiosum (Bourdot & Galzin) Hallenb.

= Conferticium =

Genus of fungi

Conferticium is a genus of fungi in the Stereaceae family.
