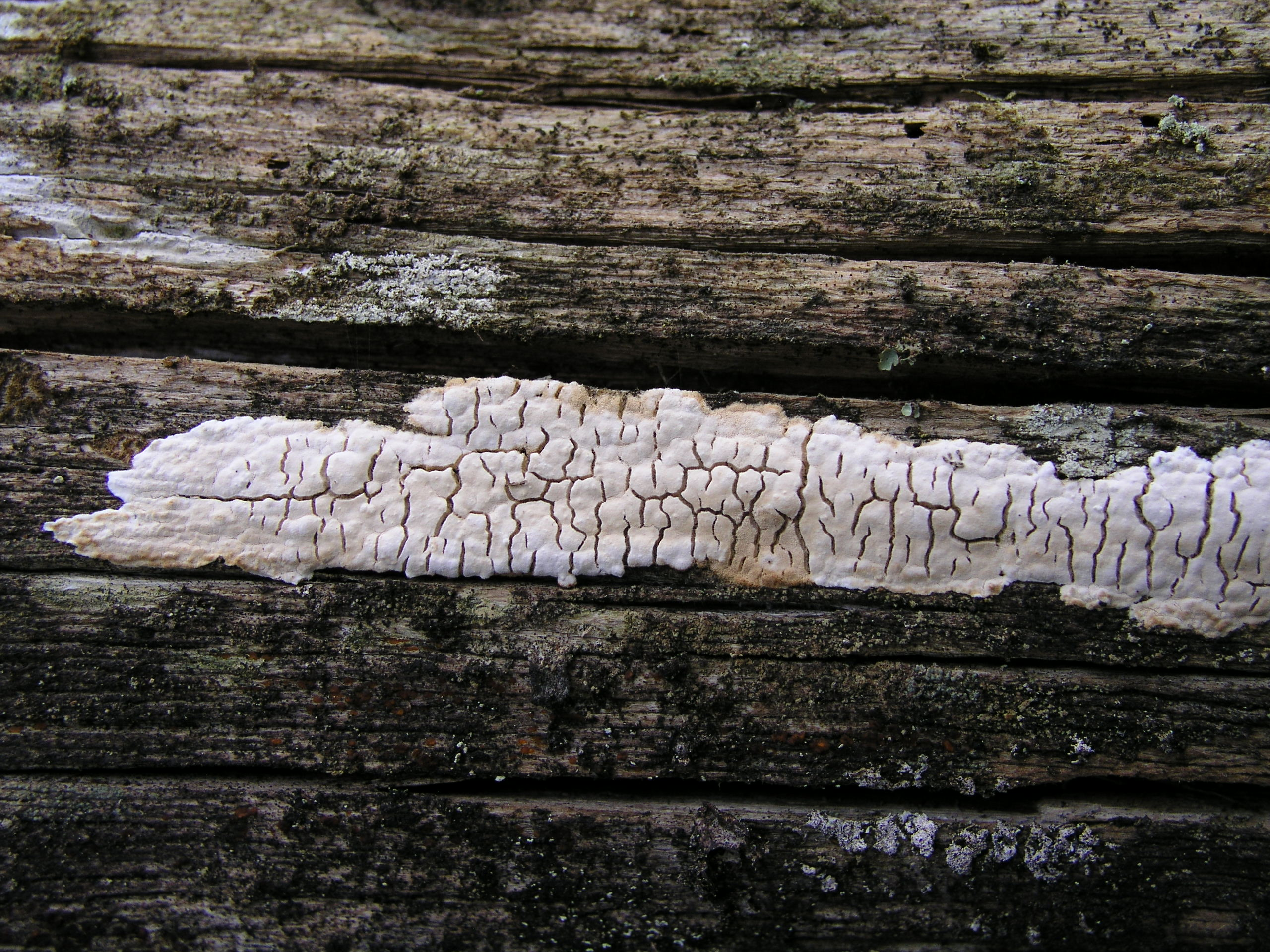
- Chaetoderma luna

Scientific classification
- Kingdom: Fungi
- Division: Basidiomycota
- Class: Agaricomycetes
- Order: Russulales
- Family: Stereaceae
- Genus: Chaetoderma; Parmasto

Species
- Chaetoderma incrassatum; Chaetoderma luna

= Chaetoderma (fungus) =

Genus of fungi

Chaetoderma is a genus of fungi in the Stereaceae family. It contains two species, both found in Europe.
