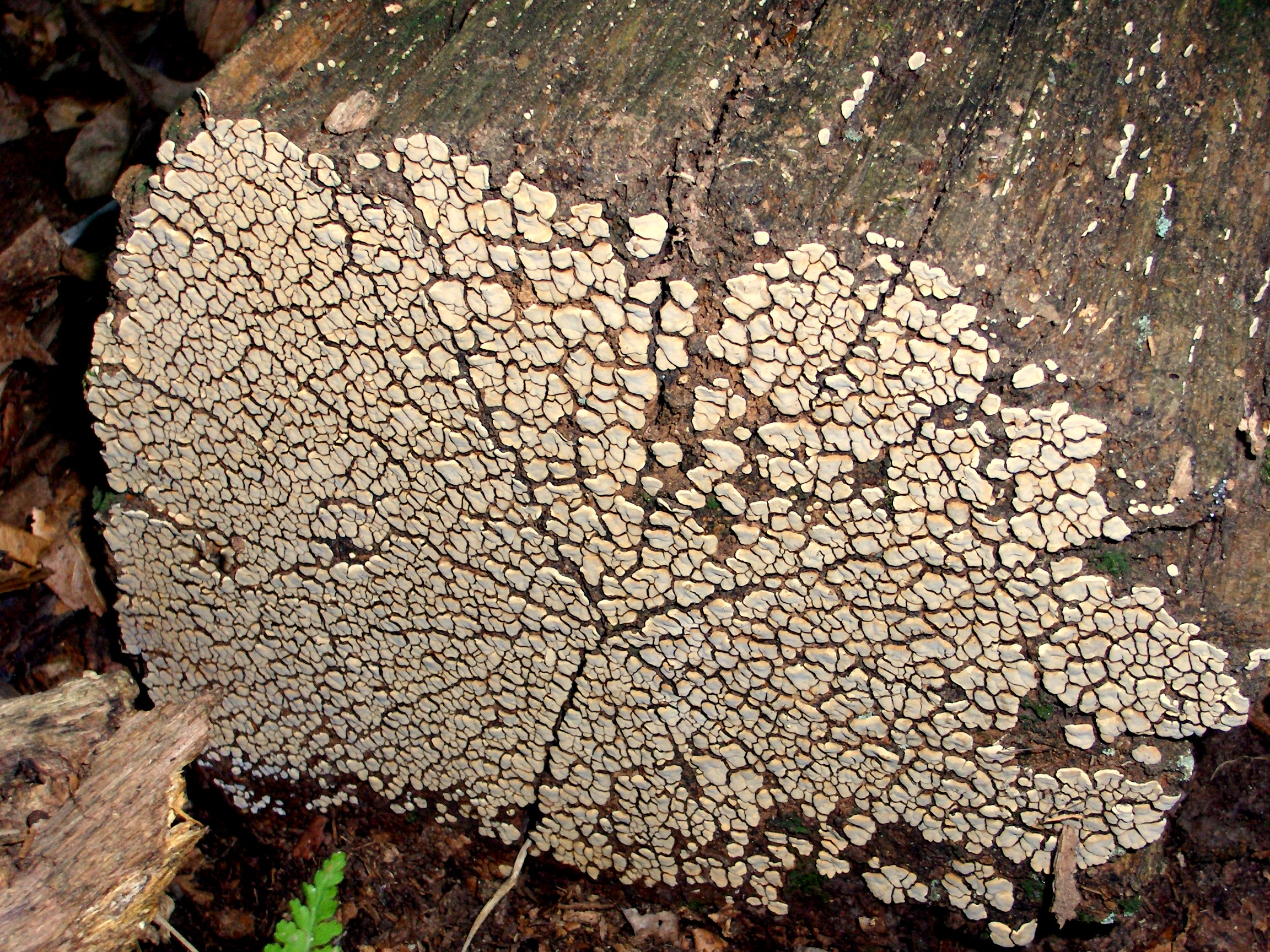
- Parchment fungus growing on the cut face of a felled oak tree

Scientific classification
- Domain: Eukaryota
- Kingdom: Fungi
- Division: Basidiomycota
- Class: Agaricomycetes
- Order: Russulales
- Family: Stereaceae
- Genus: Xylobolus
- Species: X. frustulatus

Binomial name
- Xylobolus frustulatus (Pers.) Boidin (1958)

Synonyms
- Thelephora frustulata Pers. (1801); Auricularia frustulata (Pers.) Mérat (1821); Stereum frustulatum (Pers.) Fr. (1838); Stereum frustulosum Fr. (1838); Xylobolus frustulosus (Fr.) P.Karst. (1881); Xerocarpus frustulosus (Fr.) P.Karst. (1882)

= Xylobolus frustulatus =

Species of fungus

Xylobolus frustulatus, commonly known as the ceramic fungus or ceramic parchment, is an inedible species of crust fungus in the Stereaceae family. The fruit body forms small, hard, flat crust-like aggregations that resemble broken pieces of ceramic tile. These pieces are initially whitish before turning yellow-brown to gray-brown in age. The spore-bearing cells cover the upper surfaces of the fruit body. A saprobic species, it grows on well-decayed oak wood in Asia, northern Europe, and North America.

== Taxonomy ==
The species was first described by Christian Hendrik Persoon in 1801 under the name Thelephora frustulata. It has been shuffled to several different genera in its taxonomical history, including Auricularia. French mycologist Jacques Boidin transferred it to Xylobolus in 1958, giving it the name by which it is known today. It is commonly known as the "ceramic fungus" or "ceramic parchment".

== Description ==
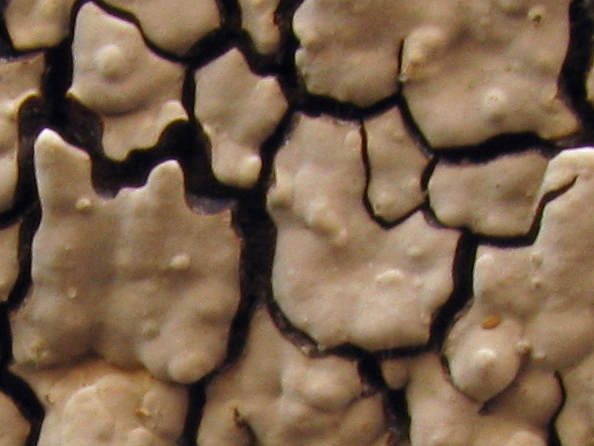
The woody fruit body is frustose–divided into small, angular polygons.

The fruit body, or crust, of Xylobolus frustulatus has a woody texture and is perennial. It is mostly 1–2 mm thick, although it can be considerably thicker. It forms patches 3–25 centimetres (1–10 in) across. The crust is frustose (cracking into small, angular polygons), and infrequently curled at the edges. The upper surface is zonate (appearing to have multiple zones of color or texture), and more or less smooth. The hymenial surface is smooth to the naked eye, although long soft hairs can be seen when viewed with a microscope. These 'hairs' are protruding acanthocystidia (cystidia bearing a few projections near the tip) and hyphae. Young layers are pale ochraceous, while older ones dull to deep brown. The fungus is inedible, and lacks any distinctive taste or odor.

The hyphal system is monomitic, meaning that there are only generative hyphae (relatively undifferentiated hyphae that can develop reproductive structures) are present. These vertically arranged, short-celled hyphae form transitions to acanthocystidia, and have a diameter of about 3.5–5 μm. They are sparsely branched, and hyaline (translucent) to yellowish-brown, although those in older layers may be more strongly pigmented. Other hyphae (such as in the trama) are few or absent, although they can be most readily observed in very thin sections. Measuring 3–5 μm wide, they are vertically arranged, thin to moderately thick-walled, and form transitions to pseudocystidia. All of the hyphae of X. frustulatus lack clamp connections.

Pseudocystidia (sterile structures arising deep in the subhymenium and protruding into the hymenium) are rare. Thin to moderately thick-walled, they rarely project above the basidia and acanthocystidia. The acanthocystidia are numerous, and have dimensions of 25–30 μm long by 4–5 μm wide. The basidia (spore-bearing cells) are shaped like long clubs, four-spored, and measure 25–30 by 4–5 μm. They are smooth or have a few basal protuberances (acanthobasidia). The spores are short-ellipsoid in shape, thin-walled or with a slight wall thickening, smooth, typically measuring 4.5–5 by 3–3.2 μm. They have a distinct amyloid reaction. The spore print is white.

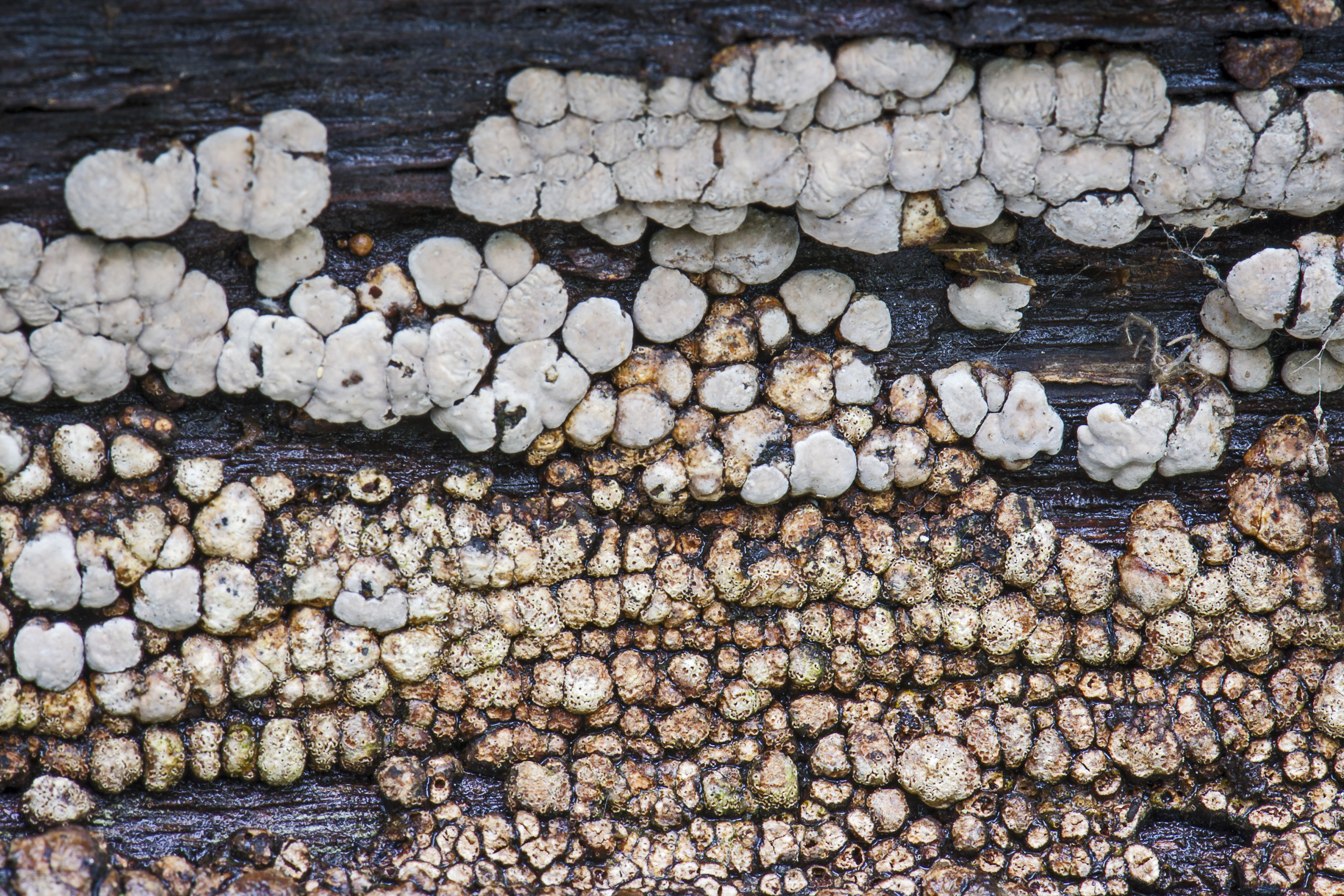
Xylobolus frustratus

=== Similar species ===
Xylobolus frustulatus is readily identified in the field because of its distinctive strongly cracked fruit bodies. Laxitextum bicolor, commonly known as the "two-tone parchment", is a potential lookalike. It forms a crust-like, spreading patch of spongy, pliant overlapping caps on rotting deciduous wood, particularly alder. It has a brownish upper surface with a suede-like texture, a white lower surface, and curled edges that give it a shell-like appearance.

== Ecology and distribution ==
The fungus is saprobic, and grows only on well-rotted wood of oak. It occurs on branches and trunks lying on the ground, and is more rarely seen on branches that are still attached to the tree. Found in northern Europe, and North America, it has also been recorded from Asia, including Japan and Taiwan. In terms of the classification of white rot fungi, X. frustulatus is a selective degrader, meaning that it breaks down lignin and hemicellulose faster than cellulose. The fungus is one of several known to break down timbers used in coal mines.

Sporulation generally takes place during the summer, as most specimens from autumn and early spring are sterile with the hymenium consisting only of acanthocystidia. Xylobolus frustulatus may be parasitized by the Hypomyces mold Hypomyces xyloboli.

== Chemistry ==
The sesquiterpenoid torreyol (also known as δ-cadinol) has been isolated from this fungus.
