= Acanthofungus =

Scientific classification
- Kingdom: Fungi
- Division: Basidiomycota
- Class: Agaricomycetes
- Order: Russulales
- Family: Stereaceae
- Genus: Acanthofungus; Sheng H.Wu, Boidin & C.Y.Chien (2000)

Type species
- Acanthofungus rimosus Sheng H.Wu, Boidin & C.Y.Chien

Species
- A. ahmadii; A. rimosus; A. thoenii

Genus of fungi

Acanthofungus is a genus of fungi in the Stereaceae family. The widely distributed genus was circumscribed in 2000.
