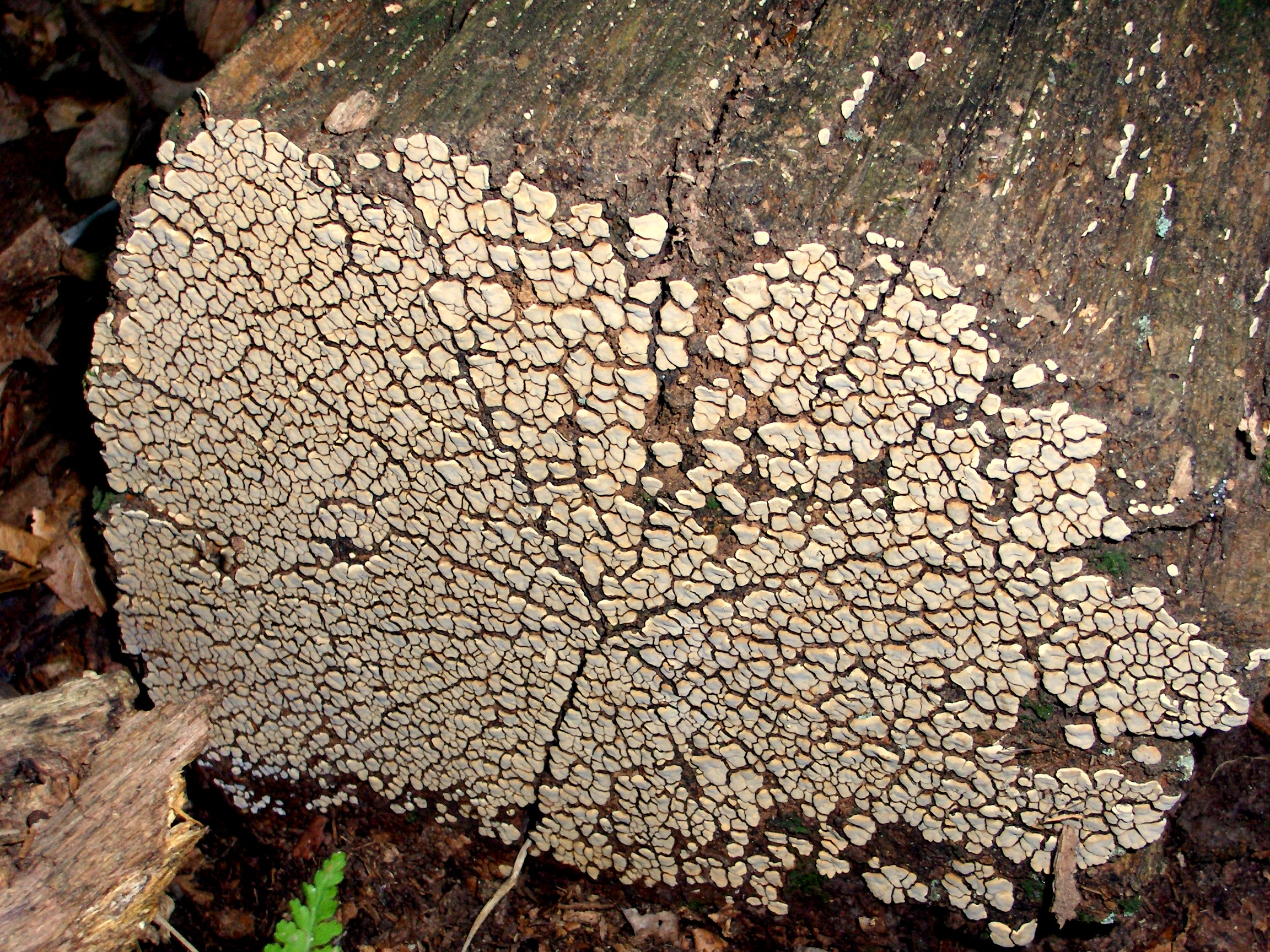
- Xylobolus frustulatus

Scientific classification
- Kingdom: Fungi
- Division: Basidiomycota
- Class: Agaricomycetes
- Order: Russulales
- Family: Stereaceae
- Genus: Xylobolus; P.Karst. (1881)

Type species
- Xylobolus frustulatus (Pers.) Boidin (1958)

Species
- X. annosus; X. frustulatus; X. hiugensis; X. illudens; X. princeps; X. spectabilis; X. subpileatus; X. thoenii

= Xylobolus =

Genus of fungi

Xylobolus is a genus of fungi in the Stereaceae family. The Dictionary of the Fungi (10th edition, 2008) estimated the genus to contain three widely distributed species; another, X. thoenii, was added in 2011. The genus was circumscribed by Petter Karsten in 1881.
