= Jena Microbial Resource Collection =

The Jena Microbial Resource Collection (JMRC) is a joint collection of the Leibniz Institute for Natural Product Research and Infection Biology – Hans-Knöll-Institute and the University of Jena. It was founded in October 2010 by merging two earlier collections from the two above-mentioned institutes. It is a research institution, which is not normally open to the public. With about 15,000 fungal and about 35,000 bacterial living isolates, it is the largest collection of this kind in Germany. The microorganisms are maintained as active cultures, with some of them in cryopreservation.

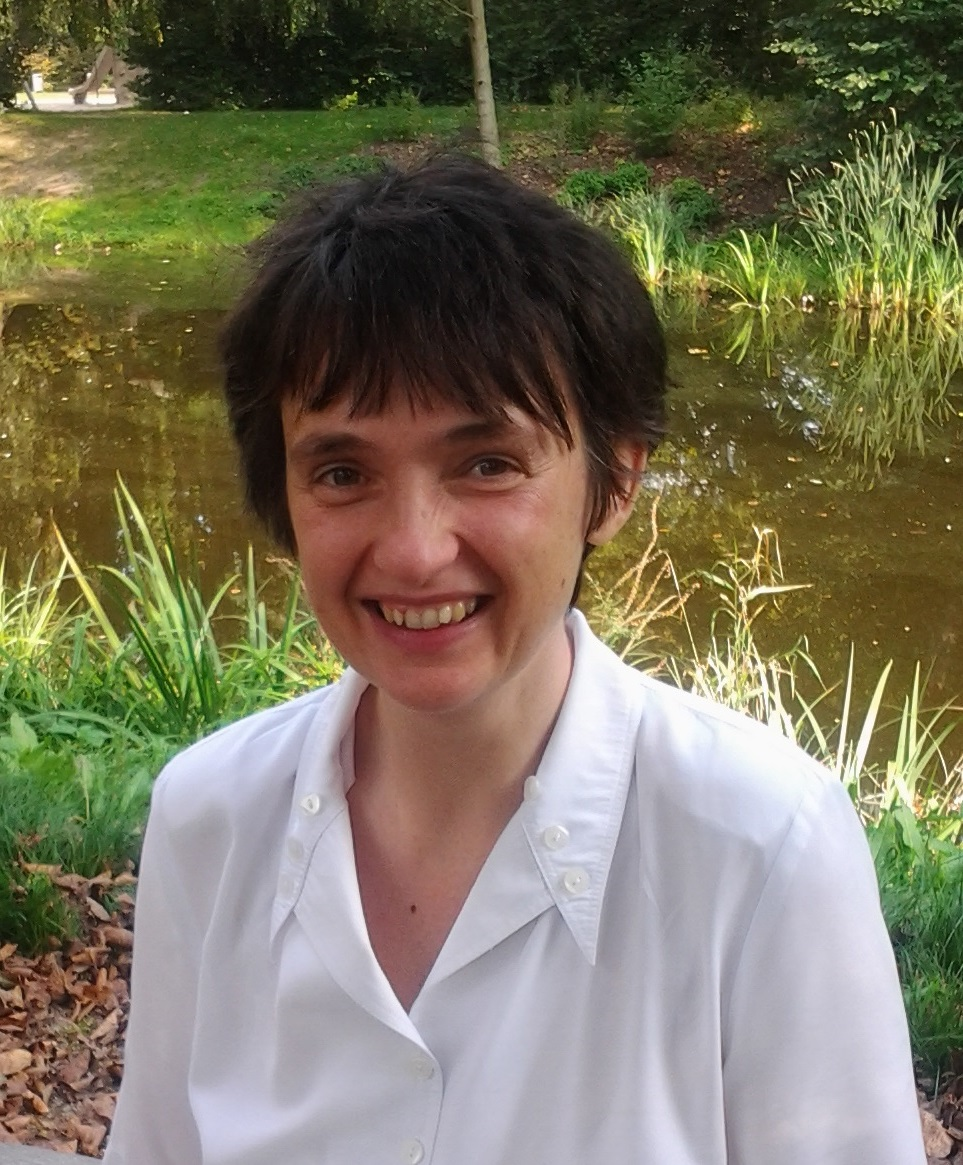
Dr. Kerstin Voigt, head of the Jena Microbial Resource Collection

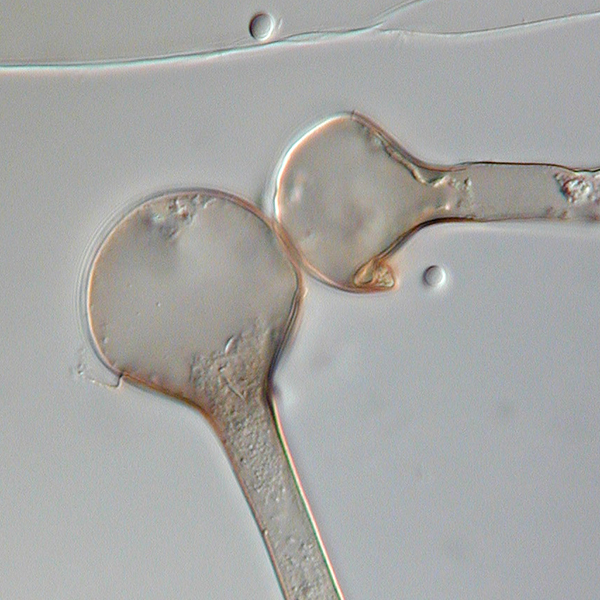
The fungus Lichtheimia corymbifera

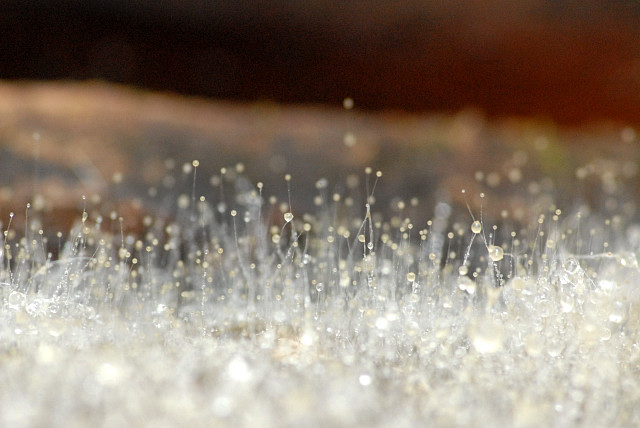
The fungus Mucor mucedo

== Aim of the collection ==
The collection is aimed at the conservation of microbial resources for natural product screening. It is also aimed at research on pathogenicity mechanisms of fungal causative agents of a variety of mycoses in animals and humans.

The head of the JMRC is Dr. Kerstin Voigt.

== Examples of microbial species in the collection ==
- Lichtheimia corymbifera, an ancient human pathogenic basal lineage fungus causing mucormycoses
- Conidiobolus coronatus, an ancient human pathogenic basal lineage fungus causing entomophthoramycoses
- Parasitic Mucorales such as Parasitella parasitica and their host organisms such as Absidia glauca (also belonging to Mucorales)
- Molds leading to food spoilage
- Plant pathogens such as Gilbertella persicaria
- Various Streptomyces
- Pseudomonas aeruginosa, a pathogenic bacterium
- Various Enterobacteriaceae
