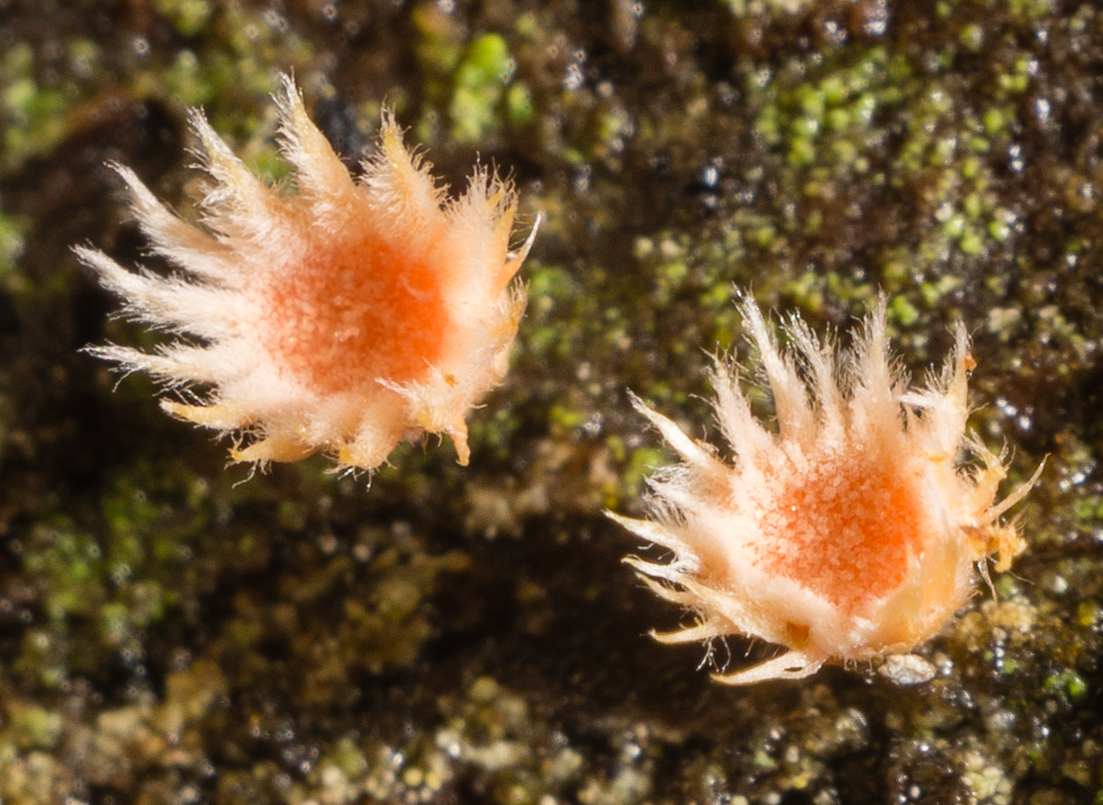

Scientific classification
- Domain: Eukaryota
- Kingdom: Fungi
- Division: Basidiomycota
- Class: Agaricomycetes
- Order: Russulales
- Family: Stereaceae
- Genus: Aleurodiscus
- Species: A. grantii

Binomial name
- Aleurodiscus grantii Lloyd (1920)

= Aleurodiscus grantii =

Species of fungus

Aleurodiscus grantii is a species of fungus in the family Stereaceae. Found in the Pacific Northwest region of North America and in Japan, it was described as new to science by mycologist Curtis Gates Lloyd in 1920. He remarked "Formed of little convex sporophores with free but not raised margin, growing caespitose on bark. Microscopic characters, as in A. amorphus. This, by those who rely on the microscope, would probably be referred to Aleurodiscus amorphus but the fruiting bodies are entirely different in shape." The specific epithet honors J.M. Grant, who collected the type specimens in Washington state. In 1994, the fungus was reported from Japan.
