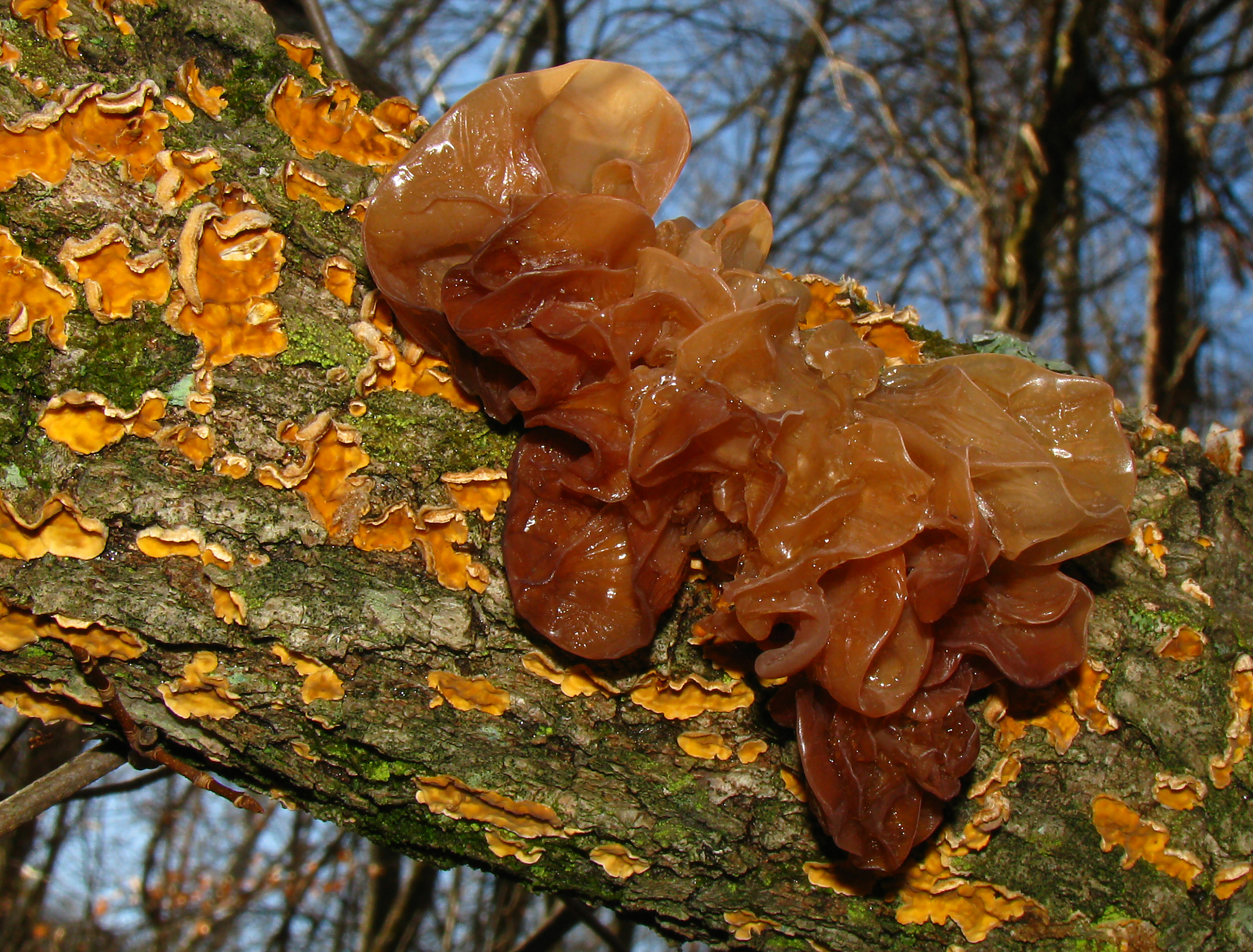
- Phaeotremella frondosa and its host, Stereum hirsutum

Scientific classification
- Kingdom: Fungi
- Division: Basidiomycota
- Class: Tremellomycetes
- Order: Tremellales
- Family: Phaeotremellaceae
- Genus: Phaeotremella
- Species: P. frondosa

Binomial name
- Phaeotremella frondosa (Fr.) Spirin & V. Malysheva (2017)

Synonyms
- Tremella frondosa Fr. (1822); Tremella nigrescens Fr. (1849); Phaeotremella pseudofoliacea Rea (1912); Tremella vasifera Chee J. Chen (1998)

= Phaeotremella frondosa =

Species of fungus

Phaeotremella frondosa
- Mycological characteristics
- Smooth hymenium
- No distinct cap
- Hymenium attachment is not applicable
- Lacks a stipe
- Ecology is parasitic
- Edibility is edible

Phaeotremella frondosa (synonym Tremella frondosa) is a species of fungus in the family Phaeotremellaceae producing brownish, frondose, gelatinous basidiocarps (fruit bodies). It is widespread in north temperate regions, and is parasitic on other species of fungi (Stereum spp.) that grow on dead attached and recently fallen branches of broadleaf trees.

== Taxonomy ==
Tremella frondosa was first published in 1822 by Swedish mycologist Elias Magnus Fries. The species was not clearly distinguished from Tremella foliacea until molecular research, based on cladistic analysis of DNA sequences, showed that the name Tremella foliacea covered several similar but distinct species. Phaeotremella frondosa is the name adopted for the widespread species growing on broadleaf trees, whilst Phaeotremella foliacea is restricted to conifers.

Phaeotremella pseudofoliacea, first described from England and the type species of the genus Phaeotremella, is considered a synonym of Phaeotremella frondosa. Tremella vasifera, described from Germany, is also considered a synonym.

The epithet "frondosa" means "leafy", with reference to the shape of the fruit bodies.

== Description ==
Fruit bodies are gelatinous, pale to dark brown, up to 7 cm (3 in) across, and seaweed-like (with branched, undulating fronds). Microscopically, the hyphae are clamped and occur in a dense gelatinous matrix. Haustorial cells arise on the hyphae, producing filaments that attach to and penetrate the hyphae of the host. The basidia are tremelloid (globose to ellipsoid, with oblique to vertical septa), 13 to 18 by 12 to 16 μm, usually unstalked. The basidiospores are subglobose to broadly ellipsoid, smooth, 6.5 to 10.5 by 5 to 9 μm, and germinate by hyphal tube or by yeast cells.

=== Similar species ===
Phaeotremella foliacea parasitizes Stereum sanguinolentum on conifers. Phaeotremella fimbriata is a European species parasitizing Stereum rugosum on broadleaf trees. Its fruitbodies are comparatively small and dark brown to black. Phaeotremella eugeniae is its temperate Asian counterpart.

Exidia crenata is somewhat similar.

== Habitat and distribution ==
Phaeotremella frondosa is a parasite of Stereum species, including S. hirsutum and S. rugosum, growing on the host's hyphae in the wood rather than on the host's fruit bodies. Following its hosts, fruit bodies of P. frondosa are typically found on dead, attached or recently fallen branches of broadleaf trees.

The species is known from North America, Europe, and northern Asia.
