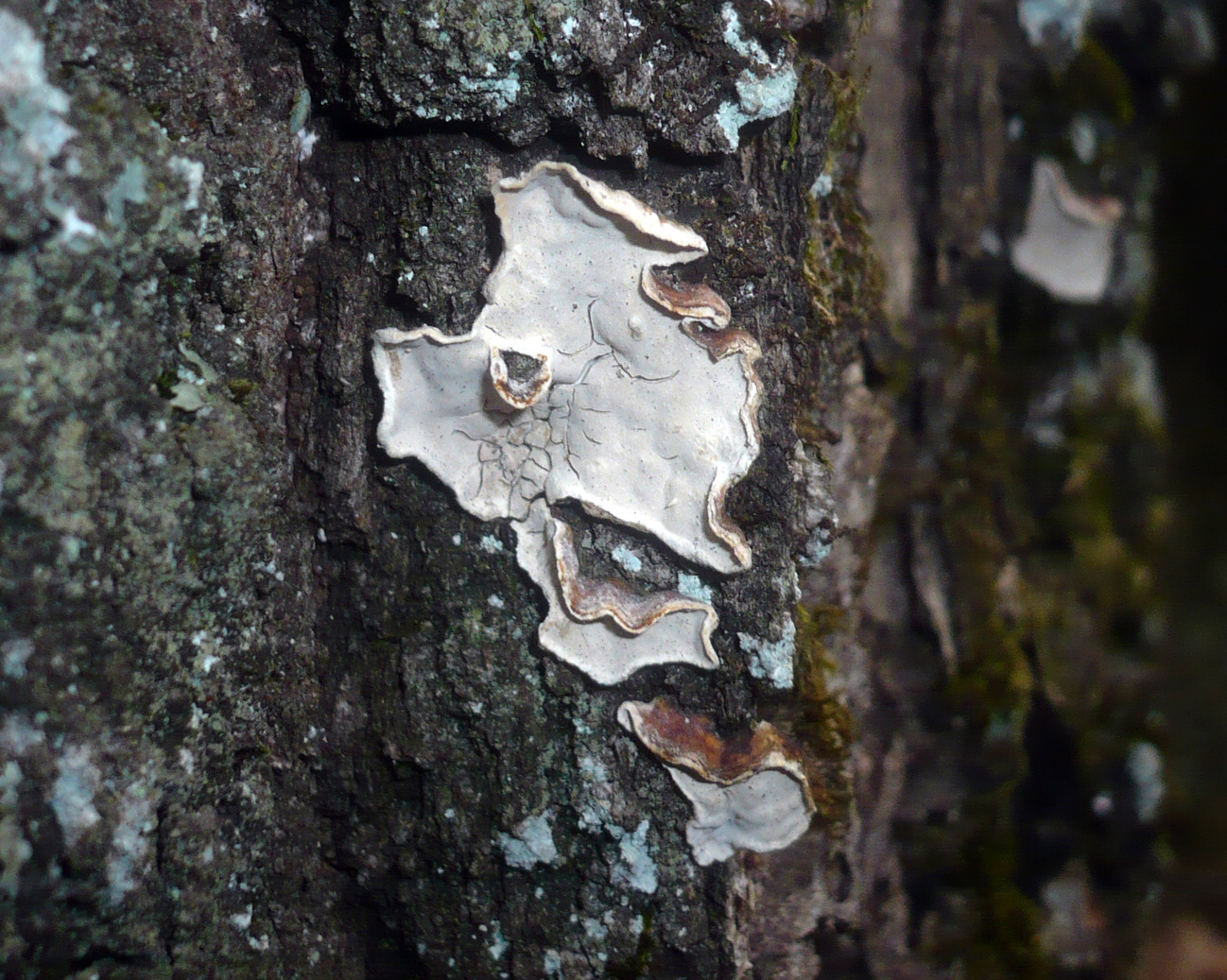
- Aleurodiscus disciformis

Scientific classification
- Domain: Eukaryota
- Kingdom: Fungi
- Division: Basidiomycota
- Class: Agaricomycetes
- Order: Russulales
- Family: Stereaceae
- Genus: Aleurodiscus; Rabenh. ex J.Schröt.

Type species
- Aleurodiscus amorphus Rabenh. (1888)

Synonyms
- Gloeosoma Bres. (1920); Nodularia Peck (1872)

= Aleurodiscus =

Genus of fungi

Aleurodiscus is a genus of corticioid fungi in the family Stereaceae.

== Species ==
- A. aberrans
- A. abietis
- A. amorphus
- A. atlanticus
- A. aurantius
- A. australiensis
- A. berggrenii
- A. botryosus
- A. canadensis
- A. cerussatus
- A. coralloides
- A. coronatus
- A. cremicolor
- A. croceus
- A. dendroideus
- A. dextrinoideocerussatus
- A. diffissus
- A. disciformis
- A. exasperatus
- A. farlowii
- A. fruticetorum
- A. gigasporus
- A. grantii
- A. ilexicola
- A. jacksonii
- A. lapponicus
- A. laurentianus
- A. limonisporus
- A. ljubarskii
- A. macrocystidiatus
- A. mesaverdensis
- A. mirabilis
- A. monilifer
- A. oakesii
- A. occidentalis
- A. ochraceoflavus
- A. parmuliformis
- A. patelliformis
- A. penicillatus
- A. piceinus
- A. roseoflavus
- A. sparsus
- A. spiniger
- A. subglobosporus
- A. succineus
- A. taxicola
- A. tenuis
- A. thujae
- A. utahensis
- A. vitellinus
- A. wakefieldiae
- A. weirii
- A. zealandicus
