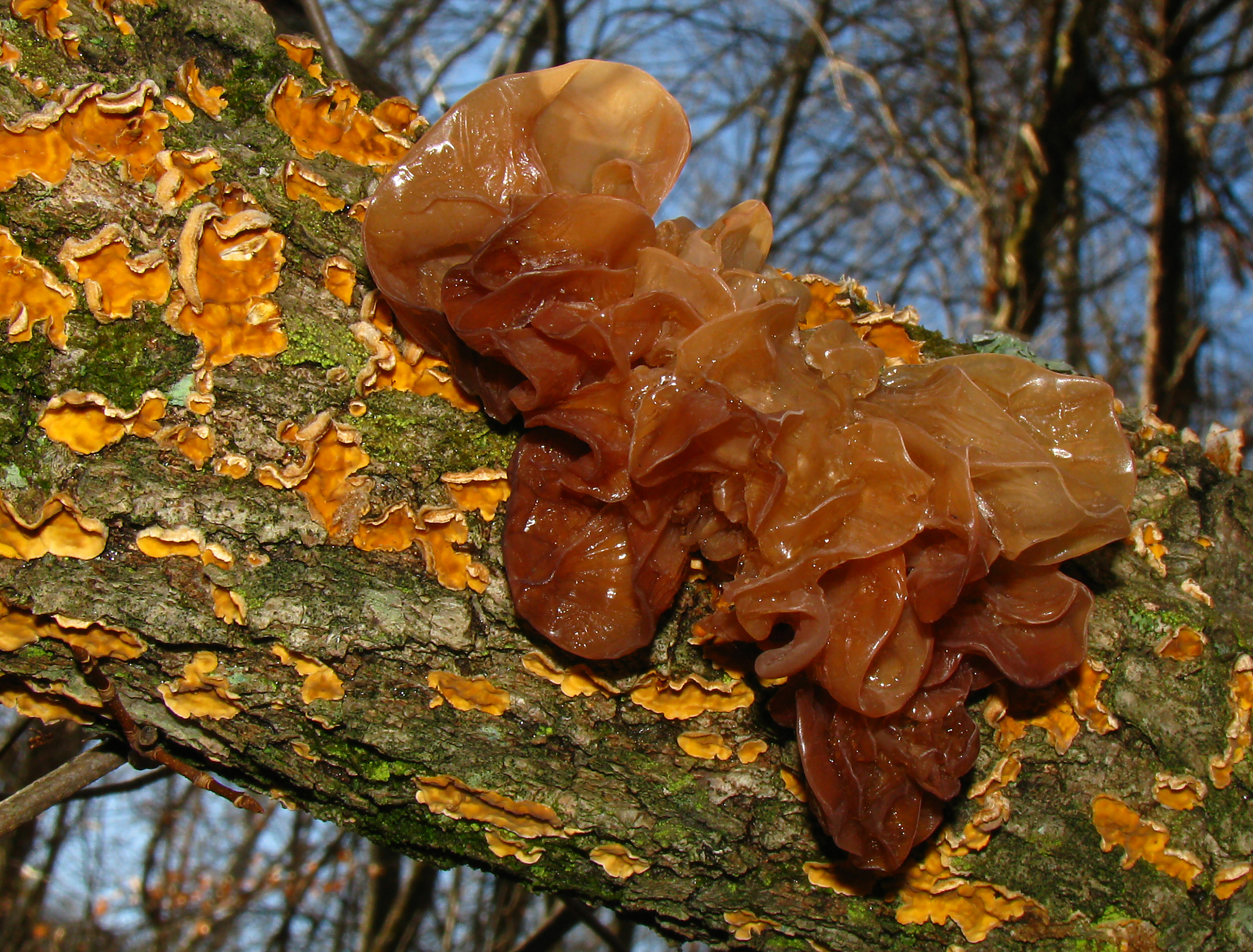
- Phaeotremella frondosa and its host, Stereum hirsutum

Scientific classification
- Kingdom: Fungi
- Division: Basidiomycota
- Class: Tremellomycetes
- Order: Tremellales
- Family: Phaeotremellaceae; A.M. Yurkov & Boekhout (2015)

Genera
- Phaeotremella; Gelidatrema

= Phaeotremellaceae =

Genus of fungi

The Phaeotremellaceae are a family of fungi in the order Tremellales. The family currently contains two genera.
