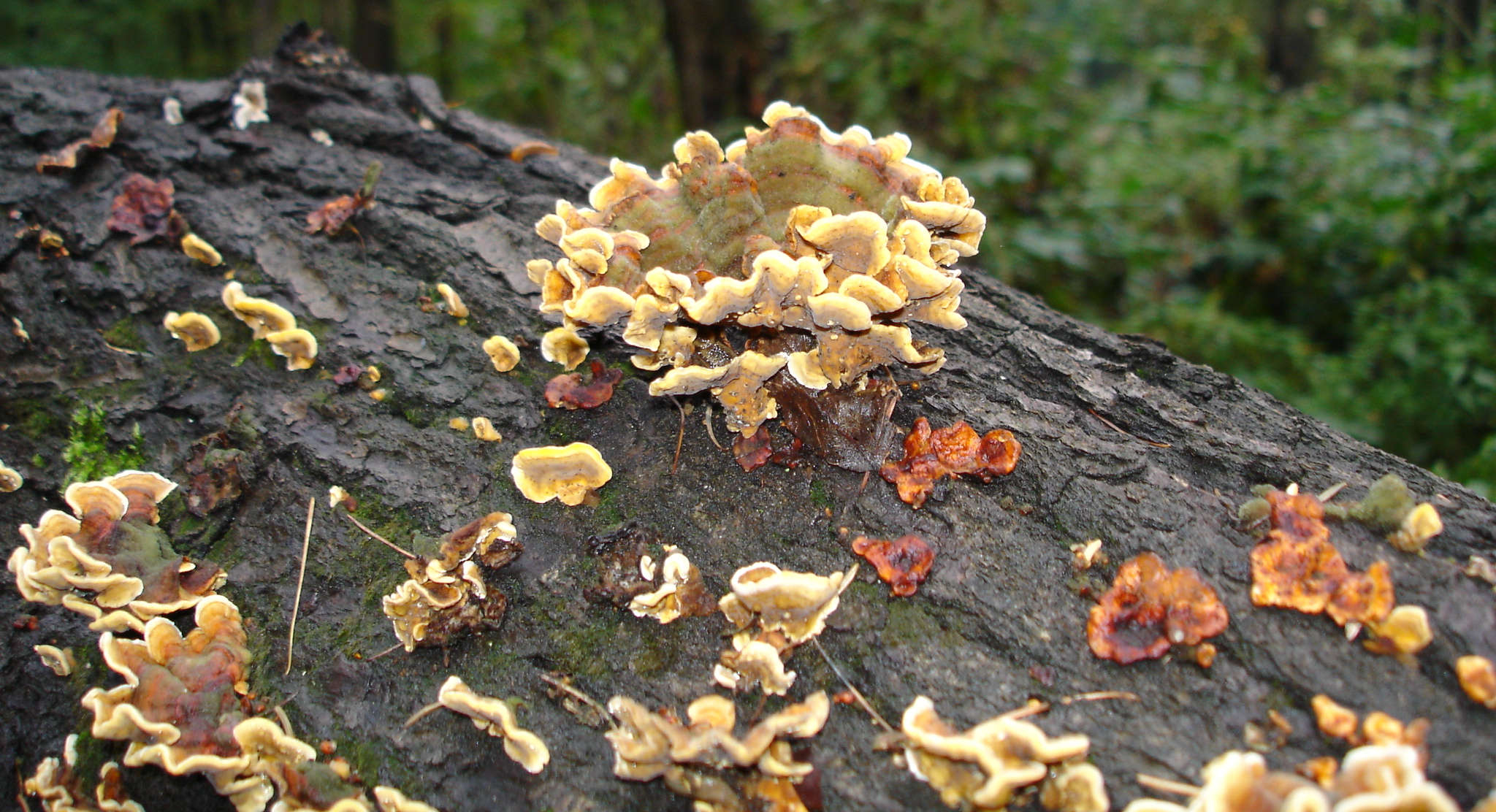
- Stereum hirsutum

Scientific classification
- Kingdom: Fungi
- Division: Basidiomycota
- Class: Agaricomycetes
- Order: Russulales
- Family: Stereaceae; Pilát

Type genus
- Stereum Hill ex Pers.

Synonyms
- Aleurodiscaceae Jülich 1981; Acanthophysiaceae Boidin, Mugnier, & Canales 1998

= Stereaceae =

Family of fungi

The Stereaceae are a family of corticioid fungi in the Russulales order. Species in the family have a widespread distribution, are lignicolous or terrestrial (in leaf litter), and typically saprobic. According to the Dictionary of the Fungi, the family contains 22 genera and 125 species.

== Genera list ==
- Acanthobasidium
- Acanthofungus
- Acanthophysellum
- Acanthophysium
- Aleurocystis
- Aleurodiscus
- Amylofungus
- Amylohyphus
- Amylosporomyces
- Amylostereum
- Boidinia
- Chaetoderma
- Conferticium
- Gloeocystidiopsis
- Gloeodontia
- Gloeomyces
- Megalocystidium
- Pseudoxenasma
- Scotoderma
- Scytinostromella
- Stereum
- Xylobolus

There is also phylogenetic evidence that the species known as BY1 is in Stereaceae, but has yet to be described completely.
