= Frondose =

Property of organism shaped like a frond

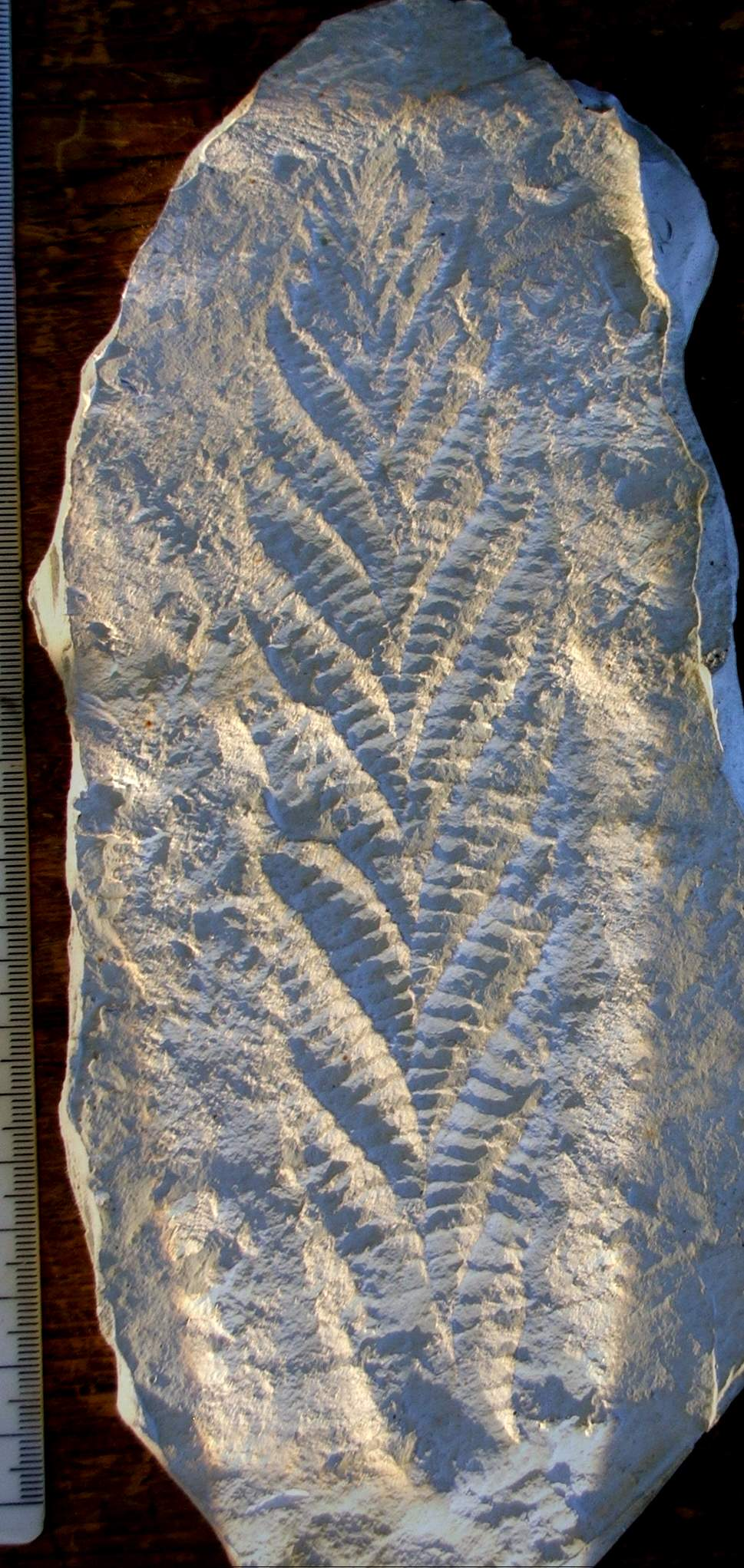
Charnia masoni, a frondose Late Ediacaran fossil with segmented, leaf-like ridges branching alternately to the right and left from a zig-zag medial suture

Frondosity (from Latin frondōsus meaning 'leafy') is the property of an organism that normally flourishes with fronds or leaf-like structures.

Many frondose organisms are thalloid and lack the organization of tissues into organs, with the exception of fern.

Frondosity is significant mainly for distinguishing particular types of macroscopic algae, and in paleobotany and paleontology, by analyzing features present in fossil biota.

Frondose macroalgae are relevant to the ecology of many marine and coastal ecosystems. Large frondose algae play an important role in the creation and functioning of healthy ecosystems from kelp forests to similar habitats. Yet, in coral reefs, frondose seaweed can be recognized as harmful due to the link between excessive blooms and coastal eutrophication.

== Ediacaran biota ==
The fossil record from the Ediacaran Period is sparse, as more easily fossilized hard-shelled animals had yet to evolve. Most fossils of the time are only faint impressions, and the shapes of fronds are one of the few identifying traits available.

Frondose fossils are the longest studied of any Ediacaran remains, but, despite this, their affinities and biology are amongst the most controversial, ranging from animal to protist to plant or stem fungi.

The oldest members of the Ediacaran biota include discoid (disk-shaped) and frondose forms. Discoidal fossils had been classified as cnidarian medusae before being redefined as holdfasts of frondose organisms, that is, the roots or stalks that held them to the sea bed.

Rangeomorphs consist of branching "frond" elements, each a few centimeters long, each of which is itself composed of many smaller branching tubes held up by a semi-rigid organic skeleton. This self-similar structure proceeds over four levels of fractality, and could have been formed using fairly simple developmental patterns. Rangeomorphs were radially symmetrical and likely sessile.

== Bryozoans ==
Bryozoans, marine invertebrates, grow in colonial structures. The patterns of growth may be used for identification. One of the identifiable forms of bryozoan colonies, is frondose. Frondose colonies are erect and have branches that are flattened like leaves.

These frond-bearing bryozoans existed in both ancient and modern times. Large tree-like forms flourished in the Triassic and Cretaceous, although frondose forms saw a decline in the Jurassic. A notable modern bryozoan with seaweed-like fronds is Flustra foliacea.
