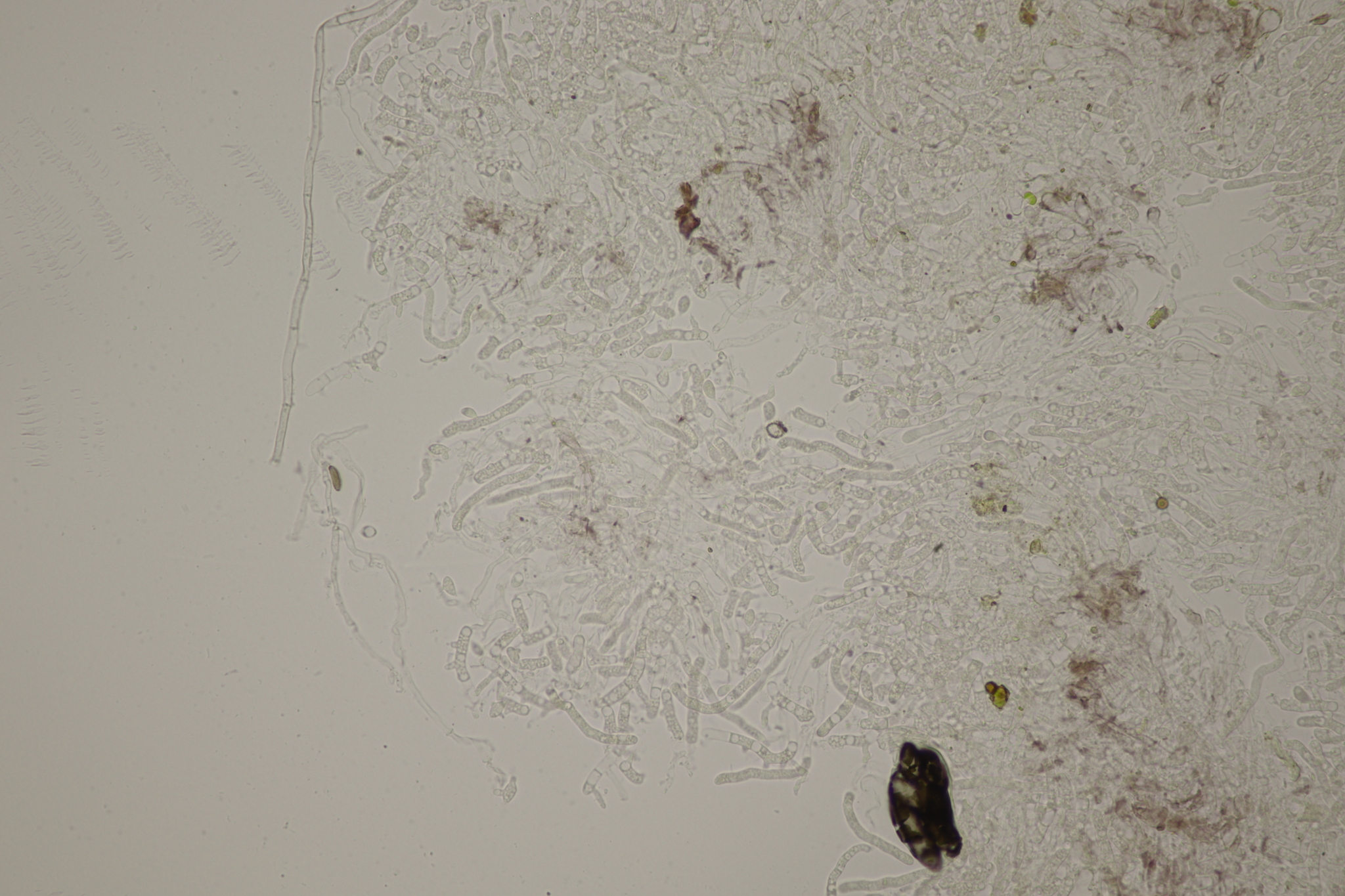

Scientific classification
- Kingdom: Fungi
- Division: Basidiomycota
- Class: Cystobasidiomycetes
- Order: Cystobasidiales
- Family: Cystobasidiaceae
- Genus: Cystobasidium
- Species: C. fimetarium

Binomial name
- Cystobasidium fimetarium (Schumach.) P. Roberts (1999)

Synonyms
- Tremella fimetaria Schum. (1803); Helicobasidium fimetarium (Schum.) Boud. (1887); Exobasidium fimetarium (Schum.) Lapl. (1894); Platygloea fimetaria (Schum.) Höhn. (1917); Achroomyces fimetaria (Schum.) Wojewoda (1977); Jola lasioboli Lagerh. (1898); Cystobasidium lasioboli (Lagerh.) Neuhoff (1924); Platygloea fimicola J. Schröt. (1889); Achroomyces fimicola (J. Schröt.) Mig. (1910)

= Cystobasidium fimetarium =

Species of fungus

Cystobasidium fimetarium is a species of fungus in the order Cystobasidiales. It is a fungal parasite forming small gelatinous basidiocarps (fruit bodies) on various ascomycetous fungi (including Lasiobolus and Thelebolus spp) on dung. Microscopically, it has auricularioid (laterally septate) basidia producing basidiospores that germinate by budding off yeast cells. The species is known from Europe and North America.

== Taxonomy ==
The species was originally described in 1803 on cow dung by Danish biologist Heinrich Schumacher who assigned it to Tremella, a genus then used for almost any fungus with gelatinous fruit bodies. In 1887 French mycologist Émile Boudier refound the species on goat dung in France and, discovering that it had auricularioid basidia (unlike Tremella species), transferred it to the auricularioid genus Helicobasidium.

In 1889, German mycologist Joseph Schröter described Platygloea fimicola as a new auricularioid species on rabbit dung from modern-day Poland. In 1898 Swedish mycologist Gustaf Lagerheim described Jola lasioboli as a new auricularioid species on cow dung from Norway. In 1924, German mycologist Walther Neuhoff transferred the latter species to his new genus Cystobasidium, based on the swollen, cyst-like probasidia from which the basidia emerge.

In 1999, British mycologist Peter Roberts noted that all these appeared to represent the same species and that Tremella fimetaria was the earliest name. Accordingly, he proposed the new combination Cystobasidium fimetarium for the species.

Molecular research, based on cladistic analysis of DNA sequences, has confirmed that the species is distinct and not closely related to other auricularioid fungi.

== Description ==
Basidiocarps are waxy-gelatinous, disc-shaped to irregularly pustular, pale pinkish lilac, 1–4 mm in diameter. Microscopically, the hyphae are occasionally clamped, 1.5 to 3 μm wide, producing occasional haustorial cells that attach to host hyphae. Basidia emerge from swollen probasidia; they are tubular, often recurved, 25-55 x 3-4 μm long, and laterally septate, forming four cells. Basidiospores are hyaline, smooth, and ellipsoid to slightly fusoid, measuring 6–11.5 x 3-5 μm; they germinate by budding off subglobose to ovoid yeast cells that form pinkish colonies in culture.

== Habitat and distribution ==
Cystobasidium fimetarium is a parasite of ascomycetous fungi on dung, including species of Lasiobolus and Thelebolus. It is known from Europe (Denmark, France, Germany, Netherlands, Norway, Poland, Spain, and Sweden) and North America (Canada) but has rarely been encountered. The only known British collection is on Thelebolus crustaceus from grouse dung in Scotland.
