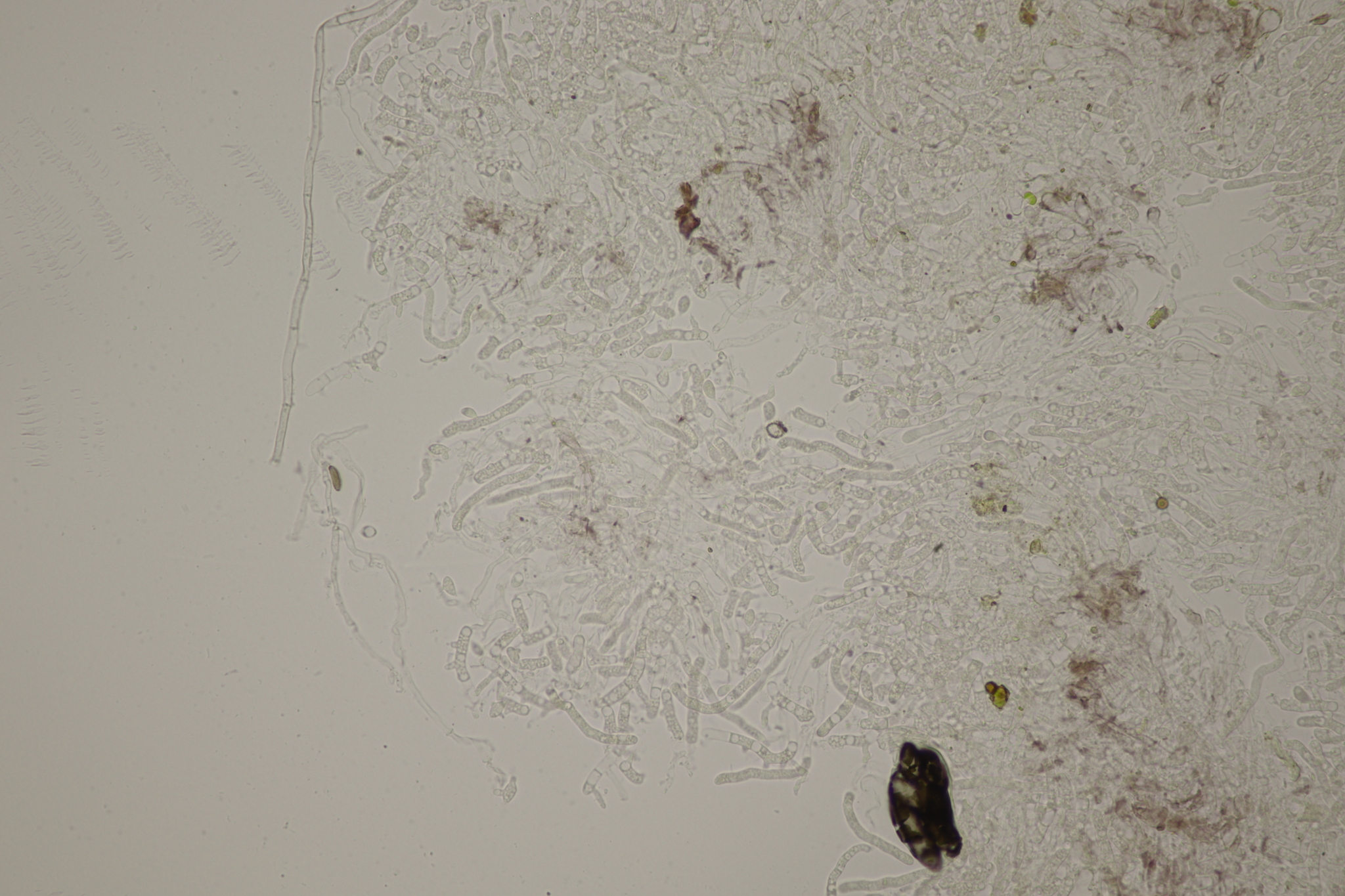
- Cystobasidium fimetarium

Scientific classification
- Domain: Eukaryota
- Kingdom: Fungi
- Division: Basidiomycota
- Class: Cystobasidiomycetes
- Order: Cystobasidiales
- Family: Cystobasidiaceae
- Genus: Cystobasidium (Lagerh.) Neuhoff (1924)

Type species
- Cystobasidium lasioboli (Lagerh.) Neuhoff (1924)

= Cystobasidium =

Genus of fungi

Cystobasidium is a genus of fungi in the order Cystobasidiales. The type species is a fungal parasite forming small gelatinous basidiocarps (fruit bodies) on various ascomycetous fungi (including Lasiobolus and Thelebolus spp) on dung. Microscopically, it has auricularioid (laterally septate) basidia producing basidiospores that germinate by budding off yeast cells. Other species are known only from their yeast states. The yeasts Cystobasidium minutum and C. calyptogenae are rare but known human pathogens.

== Taxonomy ==
The genus was originally described in 1898 by Swedish mycologist Gustaf Lagerheim as a subgenus of Jola and later (1924) raised to a full genus by the German mycologist Walther Neuhoff. Its main distinguishing feature (microscopically) was the swollen, cyst-like probasidia from which the basidia emerge. Only one species, Cystobasidium lasioboli, was originally described, but two further species with probasidia were added by subsequent authors. In 1999, British mycologist Peter Roberts noted that Tremella fimetaria Schum. (1803) was an earlier name for Cystobasidium lasioboli and proposed the new combination Cystobasidium fimetarium.

Molecular research, based on cladistic analysis of DNA sequences, has shown that Cystobasidium (based on the type species) is a monophyletic (natural) genus. An additional 20 or so yeast species have been added to the genus, most of which were formerly placed in Rhodotorula.

== Species ==
As of December 2024, Species Fungorum (in the Catalogue of Life) accepts 21 species of Cystobasidium:

- Cystobasidium alpinum Turchetti, Selbmann, Onofri & Buzzini (2020)
- Cystobasidium benthicum (Nagah., Hamam., Nakase & Horikoshi) Yurkov, Kachalkin, H.M.Daniel, M.Groenew., Libkind, V.de García, Zalar, Gouliam., Boekhout & Begerow (2014)
- Cystobasidium calyptogenae (Nagah., Hamam., Nakase & Horikoshi) Yurkov, Kachalkin, H.M.Daniel, M.Groenew., Libkind, V.de García, Zalar, Gouliam., Boekhout & Begerow (2014)
- Cystobasidium cunninghamiae Q.M.Wang (2024)
- Cystobasidium fimetarium (Schumach.) P.Roberts (1999)
- Cystobasidium halotolerans Fotedar, Boekhout, Fell & Kolecka (2019)
- Cystobasidium iriomotense Tanimura, Sugita & M.Takash. (2018)
- Cystobasidium iriomotense Tanimura, Sugita & M.Takash. ex Denchev & T.Denchev (2021)
- Cystobasidium keelungense C.F.Chang & S.M.Liu (2018)
- Cystobasidium laryngis (Reiersöl) Yurkov, Kachalkin, H.M.Daniel, M.Groenew., Libkind, V.de García, Zalar, Gouliam., Boekhout & Begerow (2014)
- Cystobasidium lysinophilum (Nagah., Hamam., Nakase & Horikoshi) Yurkov, Kachalkin, H.M.Daniel, M. Groenew., Libkind, V.de García, Zalar, Gouliam., Boekhout & Begerow (2014)
- Cystobasidium minutum (Cif. & Redaelli) Yurkov, Kachalkin, H.M.Daniel, M.Groenew., Libkind, V.de García, Zalar, Gouliam., Boekhout & Begerow (2014)
- Cystobasidium ongulense M.Tsuji, Tsujimoto & S.Imura (2017)
- Cystobasidium onofrii Venkateswaran, P.Leo & N.K.Singh (2023)
- Cystobasidium pinicola (F.Y.Bai, L.D.Guo & J.H.Zhao) Yurkov, Kachalkin, H.M.Daniel, M. Groenew., Libkind, V.de García, Zalar, Gouliam., Boekhout & Begerow (2014)
- Cystobasidium portillonense (Laich, Vaca & R.Chávez) Q.M.Wang, F.Y.Bai, M.Groenew. & Boekhout (2020)
- Cystobasidium proliferans L.S.Olive (1952)
- Cystobasidium psychroaquaticum Yurkov, Kachalkin, H.M.Daniel, M.Groenew., Libkind, V.de García, Zalar, Gouliam., Boekhout & Begerow (2015)
- Cystobasidium raffinophilum Q.M.Wang, F.Y.Bai & A.H.Li (2020)
- Cystobasidium ritchiei Yurkov, Kachalkin, H.M.Daniel, M.Groenew., Boekhout & Begerow (2015)
- Cystobasidium sebaceum G.W.Martin & Couch (1939)
- Cystobasidium slooffiae (E.K.Novák & Vörös-Felkai) Yurkov, Kachalkin, H.M.Daniel, M. Groenew., Libkind, V.de García, Zalar, Gouliam., Boekhout & Begerow (2014)
- Cystobasidium terricola Q.M.Wang, F.Y.Bai & A.H.Li (2020)
- Cystobasidium tubakii M.Tsuji, Tsujimoto & S.Imura (2017)
