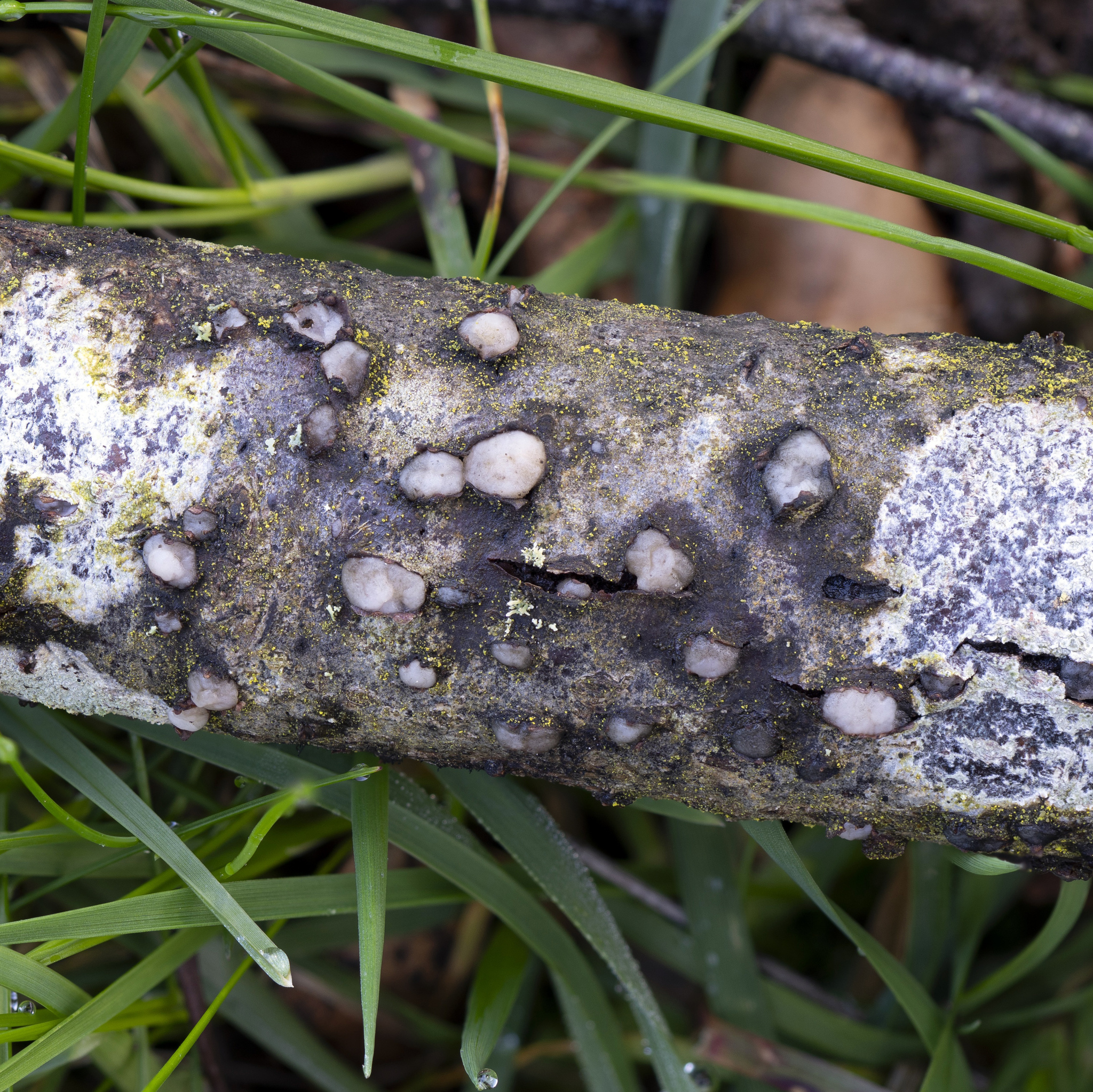
- Image of Platygloea disciformis

Scientific classification
- Kingdom: Fungi
- Division: Basidiomycota
- Class: Pucciniomycetes
- Order: Platygloeales
- Family: Platygloeaceae
- Genus: Platygloea; J. Schröt. (1887)

Type species
- Platygloea nigricans (Fr.) J. Schröt (1887)

Synonyms
- Tachaphantium Bref. (1888)

= Platygloea =

Genus of fungi

Platygloea is a genus of fungi belonging to the class Pucciniomycetes. Basidiocarps (fruit bodies) of the type species are disc-shaped, gelatinous, and occur on dead wood, probably as a saprotroph. Microscopically, all species of Platygloea sensu lato have auricularioid (laterally septate) basidia. Currently the genus (together with its possible synonym Achroomyces Bonord.) contains a heterogeneous mix of auricularioid fungi not yet accommodated in other genera.

== Taxonomy ==
=== History ===
Platygloea was proposed in 1887 by German mycologist Joseph Schröter for fungi with auricularioid (tubular and laterally septate) basidia and effused, waxy or gelatinous fruit bodies. Three species were included: Platygloea nigricans (now Platygloea disciformis); P. fimicola (now Cystobasidium fimetarium); and P. effusa (now Colacogloea effusa). Subsequent authors referred additional species to Platygloea. In a 1956 paper, American mycologist Robert Bandoni recognized 23 names in the genus. He considered Platygloea to be "a heterogeneous assortment of species" that "may be divided into several more consistent genera when better known".

Austrian mycologist F.X.R. von Höhnel claimed that Achroomyces was an older name for the genus, a synonymy considered dubious by some but adopted by the influential Dutch mycologist M.A. Donk in 1958. As a result, additional species have also been described in Achroomyces.

=== Current status ===
As predicted by Robert Bandoni, Platygloea has been divided into several new genera, including Colacogloea, Naohidea, and Occultifur, all of which were originally differentiated by their micromorphology or ultrastructure. Their status as monophyletic (natural) genera has been confirmed by molecular research, based on cladistic analysis of DNA sequences. This research has also confirmed that Platygloea sensu stricto is monophyletic, based on the type species, Platygloea disciformis. The genus may be monotypic (restricted to the type species), since according to German mycologist Franz Oberwinkler P. disciformis is "taxonomically isolated" and "closely related species are not known".
