= Platycarpa =

Scientific classification
- Domain: Eukaryota
- Kingdom: Fungi
- Division: Basidiomycota
- Class: Pucciniomycetes
- Order: Platygloeales
- Family: Eocronartiaceae
- Genus: Platycarpa
- Species: P. polypodii

Binomial name
- Platycarpa polypodii (Couch) Couch (1949)

Synonyms
- Septobasidium polypodii Couch (1929)

Species of fungus

Platycarpa is a genus of fungus in the order Platygloeales, containing the single species Platycarpa polypodii. The species forms effused basidiocarps (fruit bodies) on ferns, on which it is parasitic.

The known host for Platycarpa polypodii is a fern in the genus Polypodium. The fungus parasitizes host leaves, producing basidiocarps as small whitish patches covering the sori. Microscopically, the basidia are auricularioid (tubular with lateral septa) and emerge from thin-walled probasidia. The species was originally described by American mycologist John N. Couch based on a collection from Jamaica. A second species, Platycarpa boliviensis, is now considered a synonym of Ptechetelium cyatheae.
