= Ascodesmis nigricans =

Scientific classification
- Kingdom: Fungi
- Division: Ascomycota
- Class: Pezizomycetes
- Order: Pezizales
- Family: Ascodesmidaceae
- Genus: Ascodesmis
- Species: A. nigricans

Binomial name
- Ascodesmis nigricans Tieghem (1876)

Species of fungus

Ascodesmis nigricans is a coprophilous fungus that could be isolated from the dung of various animals. It was firstly introduced by Philippe Édouard Léon Van Tieghem, a French botanist, and was the type species of the genus Ascodesmis. It is an uncommon species but its development of the fruit body has been the subject of much laboratory study due to the easy nature of its cultivation. Ascodesmis nigricans is not pathogenic to human, animals or plants. This species has world-wide distribution.

== History and taxonomy ==
Ascodesmis nigricans is firstly introduced in by Philippe Édouard Léon Van Tieghem in France in 1876 as a representative type species of genus Ascodesmis. The genus Ascodesmis belonged to discomycetes which is characterized by species contained disc-shaped ascocarps called apothecia. "Ascodesmis" was given as the genus name because of all the species that under it have a fruit body which only contained an exposed bundle of asci. The growth and development of Ascodesmis nigricans were further studied by van Tieghem. In 1905, Peter Clausen published a paper on Ascodesmis nigricans, giving a detailed description of the morphology of A. nigricans, but he mistakenly regarded this fungus as Boudiera, a new species of that genus. This error was corrected soon after the publication, by Fridiano Cavara an Italian botanist who had published his observation and record of A. nigricans grew on human feces. The etymology of the species epithet of A. nigricans refers to the Latin "nigricans", meaning black in color.

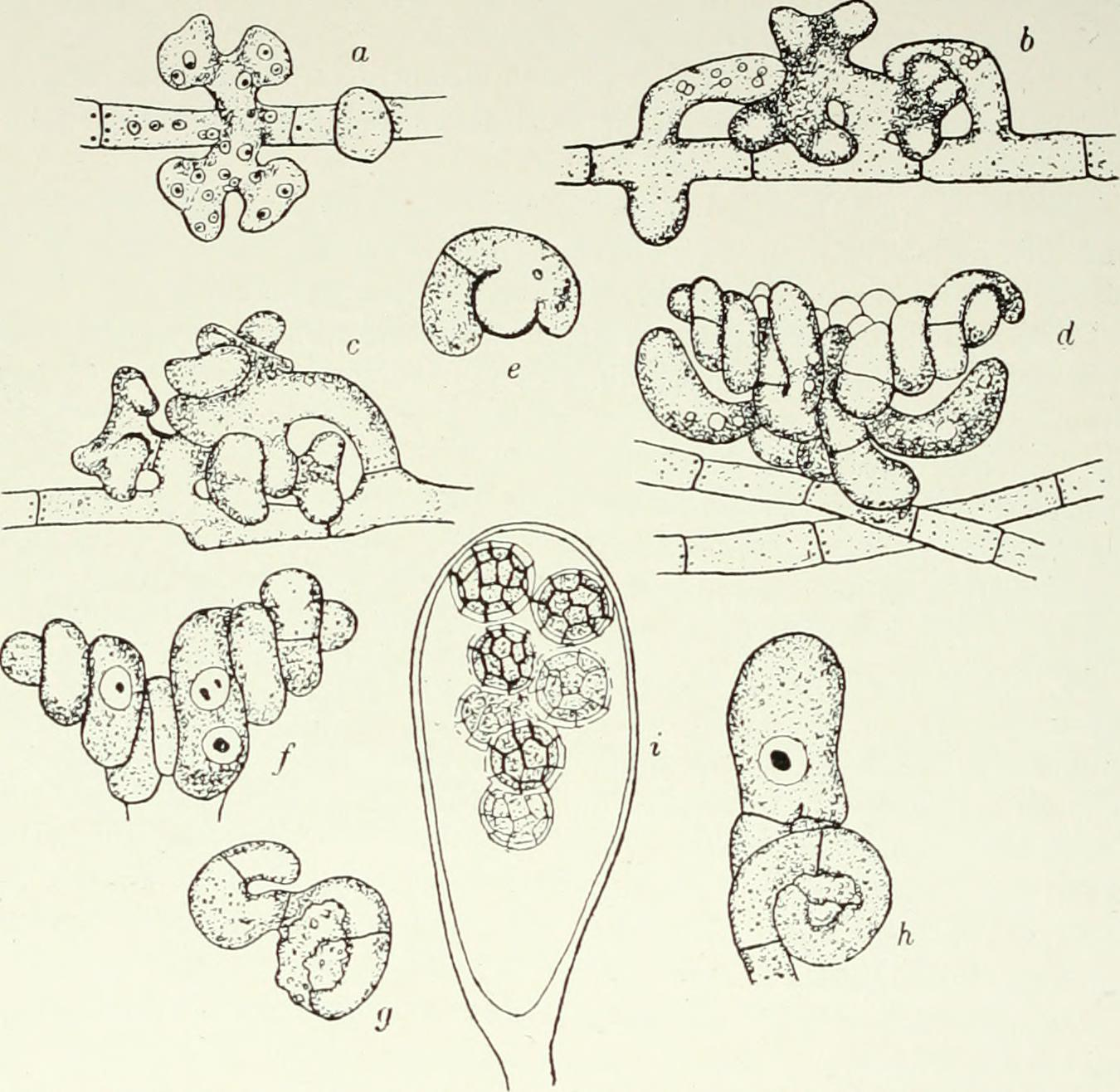
Ascomata and ascospores of Ascodesmis nigricans

== Morphology and ultrastructure ==
The mycelium of A. nigricans consisted of hyaline cylindrical hyphae that do not produce conidia and spermatia. Apothecium, the cup-shaped fruit body of A. nigricans, could be alone or gregarious and its small size make this species difficult to be collected frequently from the natural environment. However, the structure of apothecium would be observed clearly when it grows on artificial media. It consists of exposed hymenium which contains several unprotected asci surrounding with abundant unbranched paraphyses. Apothecium also contained hypothecium which formed by thin-walled hyphae and without excipulum. The tiny apothecium is hemispherical and flattens as aging. The clavate asci which contain ascospores are produced by the ascogenous hyphae with the broad base or a short broad stalk. Only a cluster of asci would be formed in a mature apothecium, and as the asci successfully mature, the asci shrink to a short stipe and give rise to a large attached operculum. Randomly arranged ascospores that set in the upper area of asci would be discharged through operculum at the asci tip.

The ultrastructure of ascospores of A. nigricans was investigated to have a deeper understanding of the formation of wall layers and ornamentation of ascospores. The invagination of the plasma membrane of ascus generates the two unit membranes that consist of the ascus vesicle. Then partially invaginated ascus vesicle form the delimiting membranes for ascospore which also consist of two unit membranes with close space between them. Subsequently, a primary and secondary wall of ascospore would be formed. The inner delimiting membrane became the primary wall with a consistent structure and no ornamentation. The ascospores would become more spherical as the completion of the primary wall. As soon as the primary wall is formed, the wall material deposited in the original space between two delimiting membranes gives rise to an extra wall layer which is known as the secondary wall. The randomly arranged wall material develops ornamentation for mature ascospores. During the formation of the secondary wall, the primary wall differentiates into two layers, inner endospore, and outer epispore.

== Growth and reproduction ==
Ascodesmis nigricans is a homothallic fungus. The formation of apothecium begins with the lateral hyphae which then branch dichotomously and form T-shaped gametangial initials. After the germination, these initial organs lengthen and coil helically to form exposed gametangia. Then multinucleate hyphae give rise to archicarps, which would develop to ascogonia eventually, and antheridia of A. nigricans. Each archicarps consist of an oogonium which contains approximately 6 nuclei and a trichogyne which contain two nuclei normally. The nuclei of trichogyne disintegrate later. When the communication between oogonia and antheridia is established, male and female nuclei fuse together in pairs in oogonium. In the nuclear fusion process, the nuclear content mix together after the dissolution of the membranes of each nucleus, and larger nuclei would be produced as the final product of this nuclear fusion. Following nuclear fusion, the oogonium expands and about three ascogenous hyphae would develop from it and give rise to asci which then produce ascospores.

Ascodesmis nigricans is easily to grow on artificial media within a proper temperature range, which is around 24 °C. Also, light is not necessary for either formation or maturation of the ascospores.

== Habitat and distribution ==
As a coprophilous fungus, A. nigricans is commonly isolated from the dung of both omnivorous and herbivore animals, such as dogs, goat, sheep, rat, donkey, pig, fox and ostrich. It also was found from the soil contaminated by dung. Basically, A. nigricans is a cosmopolitan species. Its distributions cover France, India, Italy, Portugal, Canada, U.S.A., England, Denmark, Sweden. In addition to this, it was found in Asia, Africa, Australia occasionally.
