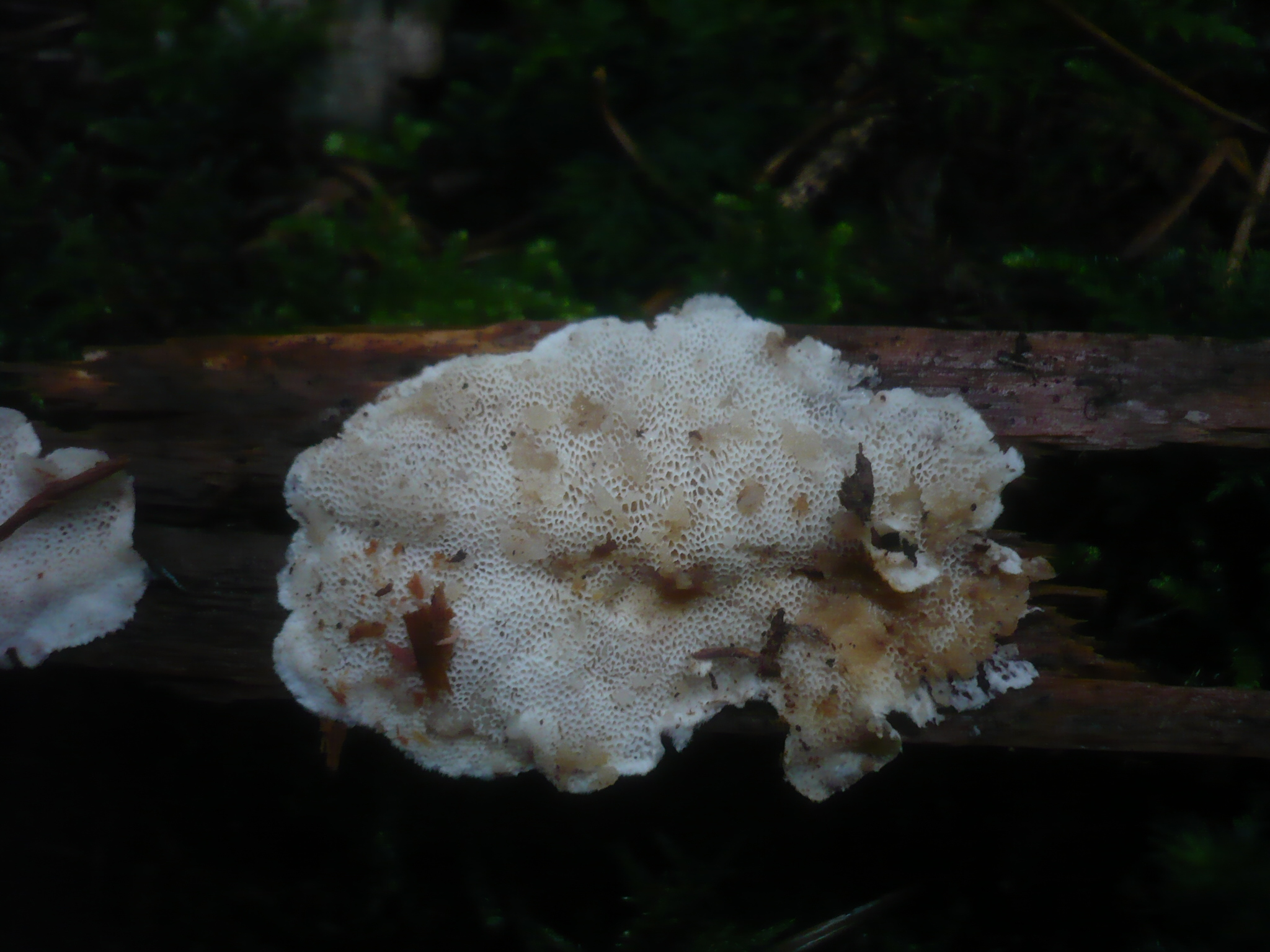
- Carcinomyces polyporinus on its poroid host

Scientific classification
- Domain: Eukaryota
- Kingdom: Fungi
- Division: Basidiomycota
- Class: Tremellomycetes
- Order: Tremellales
- Family: Carcinomycetaceae
- Genus: Carcinomyces; Oberw. & Bandoni (1982)

Type species
- Carcinomyces effibulatus (Ginns & Sunhede) Oberw. & Bandoni (1982)

Species
- Carcinomyces arundinariae Carcinomyces effibulatus Carcinomyces nordestensis Carcinomyces polyporinus

= Carcinomyces =

Genus of fungi

Carcinomyces is a genus of fungi in the order Tremellales. Species are parasites of other fungi and produce anamorphic yeast states. Four species of Carcinomyces are recognized worldwide. The generic placement of a fifth species, Carcinomyces mycetophilus, is currently uncertain.

== Taxonomy ==
=== History ===
Carcinomyces was introduced in 1982 by Franz Oberwinkler and Robert Bandoni for two species forming conspicuous, gelatinous galls on fruit bodies of the agaric, Gymnopus dryophilus. The genus was differentiated from Syzygospora and Christiansenia by its agaric hosts and, microscopically, by its lack of zygoconidia (twinned conidia). In 1986, James Ginns placed the genus in synonymy with Syzygospora. Molecular research, based on cladistic analysis of DNA sequences, has, however, shown that Syzygospora is polyphyletic (and hence artificial) and has accepted Carcinomyces as a separate, monophyletic (natural) genus, though no longer restricted to agaric hosts. Two recently described species are known only from their yeast states.
