= Lasiobolus lasioboloides =

Scientific classification
- Domain: Eukaryota
- Kingdom: Fungi
- Division: Ascomycota
- Class: Pezizomycetes
- Order: Pezizales
- Family: Ascodesmidaceae
- Genus: Lasiobolus
- Species: L. lasioboloides

Binomial name
- Lasiobolus lasioboloides Marchal

Species of fungi

Lasiobolus lasioboloides is a species of coprophilous fungus in the family Ascodesmidaceae. It grows on the dung of sheep.
