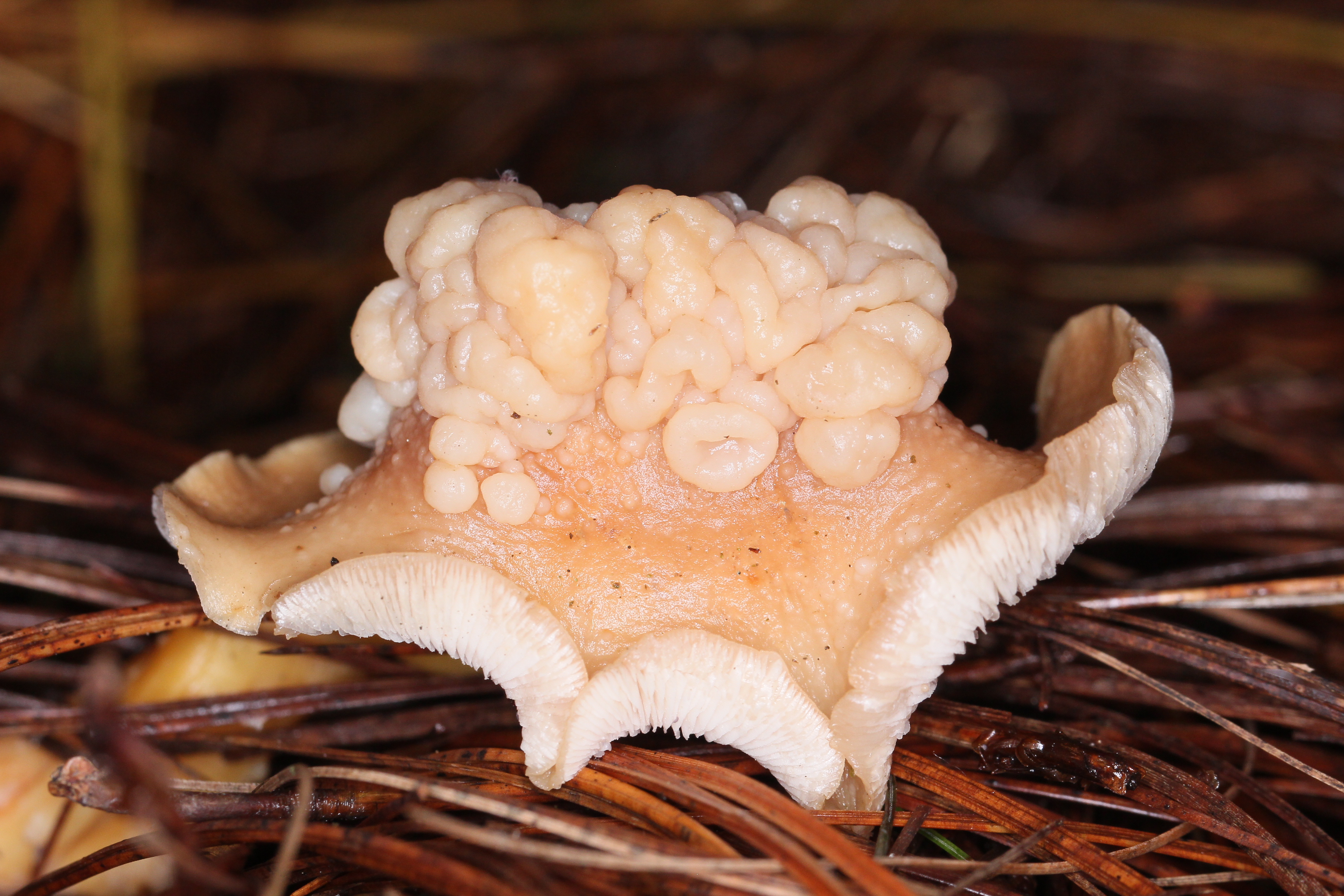
- Galls of Carcinomyces mycetophilus on the agaric Gymnopus dryophilus

Scientific classification
- Domain: Eukaryota
- Kingdom: Fungi
- Division: Basidiomycota
- Class: Tremellomycetes
- Order: Tremellales
- Family: Carcinomycetaceae
- Genus: Carcinomyces
- Species: C. mycetophilus

Binomial name
- Carcinomyces mycetophilus (Peck) Oberw. & Bandoni (1982)

Synonyms
- Tremella mycetophila Peck (1875); Christiansenia mycetophila (Peck) Ginns & Sunhede (1978); Syzygospora mycetophila (Peck) Ginns (1986)

= Carcinomyces mycetophilus =

Species of fungus

Carcinomyces mycetophilus is a species of fungus in the class Tremellomycetes. It is a parasite, producing extensive, gelatinous galls on basidiocarps (fruit bodies) of its host, the agaric Gymnopus dryophilus. Its generic placement is currently uncertain, but morphologically it is close to the type species of Carcinomyces. It was first described by Charles Horton Peck from North America, where it is widespread and called Collybia jelly. It has also been recorded in continental Europe.
