= Insolibasidium =

Scientific classification
- Kingdom: Fungi
- Division: Basidiomycota
- Class: Pucciniomycetes
- Order: Platygloeales
- Family: Platygloeaceae
- Genus: Insolibasidium; Oberw. & Bandoni
- Species: I. deformans

Binomial name
- Insolibasidium deformans (C.J. Gould) Oberw. & Bandoni (1984)

Synonyms
- Herpobasidium deformans C.J. Gould (1945)

Genus of fungi

Insolibasidium deformans is a species of fungus belonging to the order Platygloeales. It is currently the only species in the monotypic genus Insolibasidium. The fungus parasitizes leaves of various Lonicera species, causing honeysuckle leaf blight, a commercially significant disease in plant nurseries.

The known hosts for Insolibasidium deformans include at least 18 species of Lonicera. The fungus parasitizes host leaves, producing hyphae within the leaf tissues and basidia that protrude through the stomata. Microscopically, the basidia are auricularioid (tubular with lateral septa). Infected leaves become yellow, then brown, and finally dead and dry with brown areas. Leaves often become rolled and twisted and drop prematurely.

The species is native to North America and has been introduced into the UK where honeysuckle leaf blight was first observed in 2000 and into Australia, where the disease was first observed in 2003. It has also been recorded from Germany, Poland, and New Zealand.
