= Occultifur =

Scientific classification
- Kingdom: Fungi
- Division: Basidiomycota
- Class: Cystobasidiomycetes
- Order: Cystobasidiales
- Family: Cystobasidiaceae
- Genus: Occultifur; Oberw. (1990)

Type species
- Occultifur internus (L.S. Olive) Oberw. (1990)

Species
- O. brasiliensis O. corticiorum O. externus O. kilbournensis O. lumbricifer O. mephitis O. plantarum O. rivoirei O. tropicalis

Genus of fungi

Occultifur is a genus of fungi in the family Cystobasidiaceae. Species are parasites of other fungi and, microscopically, have auricularioid (laterally septate) basidia and basidiospores that germinate by yeast cells. Several species are currently only known from their yeast states. The genus is distributed worldwide.

== Taxonomy ==
Occultifur was proposed in 1990 by German mycologist Franz Oberwinkler for a fungus with auricularioid (tubular and laterally septate) basidia that occurred as a parasite in the fruit bodies of Dacrymyces species. The species had previously been referred to the genus Platygloea, but was distinguished from fungi in that genus by its parasitic lifestyle, by its production of haustorial cells that connect to host hyphae, and by its formation of a yeast state. Subsequent authors referred additional species to Occultifur.

Molecular research, based on cladistic analysis of DNA sequences, has shown that Occultifur is a monophyletic (natural) genus. An additional five or so yeast species have been added to the genus.
