= Lasiobolus cuniculi =

Scientific classification
- Domain: Eukaryota
- Kingdom: Fungi
- Division: Ascomycota
- Class: Pezizomycetes
- Order: Pezizales
- Family: Ascodesmidaceae
- Genus: Lasiobolus
- Species: L. cuniculi

Binomial name
- Lasiobolus cuniculi Velen.

Species of fungi

Lasiobolus cuniculi is a species of coprophilous fungus in the family Ascodesmidaceae. It is known to grow on the dung of sheep, goats and donkeys.
