= Sakaguchia cladiensis =

Scientific classification
- Domain: Eukaryota
- Kingdom: Fungi
- Division: Basidiomycota
- Class: Cystobasidiomycetes
- Order: Sakaguchiales
- Family: Sakaguchiaceae
- Genus: Sakaguchia
- Species: S. cladiensis

Binomial name
- Sakaguchia cladiensis (Fell, Statzell & Scorzetti) Q.M. Wang, F.Y. Bai, M. Groenew. & Boekhout (2015)

Synonyms
- Rhodotorula cladiensis Fell, Statzell & Scorzetti (2011)

Species of fungus

Sakaguchia cladiensis is a yeast species first found in the Florida Everglades.
