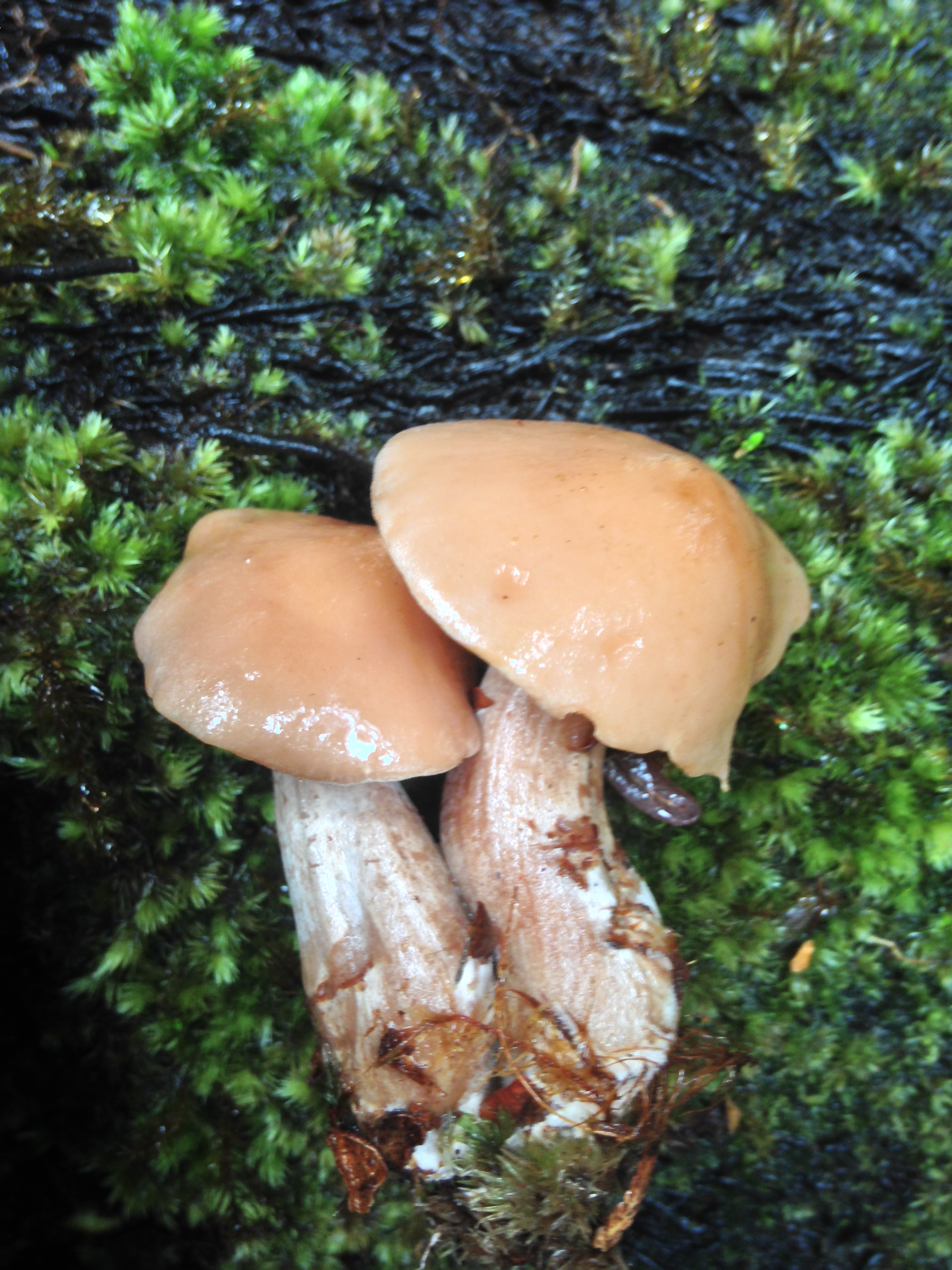

Scientific classification
- Kingdom: Fungi
- Division: Basidiomycota
- Class: Agaricomycetes
- Order: Agaricales
- Family: Omphalotaceae
- Genus: Rhodocollybia
- Species: R. laulaha

Binomial name
- Rhodocollybia laulaha Desjardin, Halling & Hemmes (1999)

= Rhodocollybia laulaha =

Species of fungus

Rhodocollybia laulaha is a species of fungus in the family Omphalotaceae. Found in Hawaii, it was described as new to science in 1999 by mycologists Dennis Desjardin, Roy Halling, and Don Hemmes. The fruitbodies have caps that are 3 to 8 cm (1 to 3 in) in diameter, bell-shaped to convex in shape, and light brown (young specimens) to grayish orange or orange-white (old specimens). Gills have an adnexed attachment to the stipe, and are narrow and very crowded together. The stipe is 3 to 8 cm (1 to 3 in) long by 0.6 to 0.7 cm (0.24 to 0.28 in) thick. The specific epithet laulaha—Hawaiian for "widespread"—refers to its widespread distribution and common appearance on the Hawaiian Islands.
