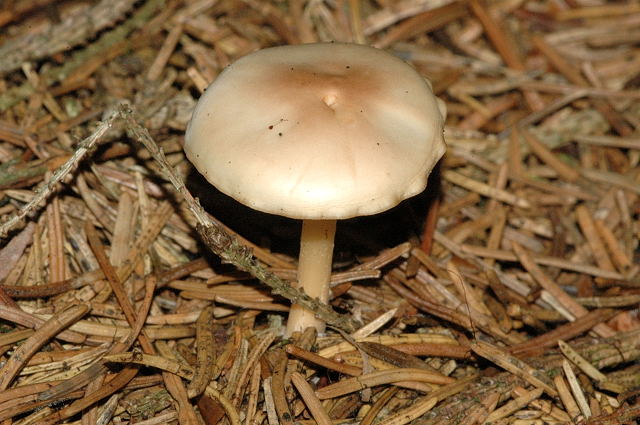

Scientific classification
- Domain: Eukaryota
- Kingdom: Fungi
- Division: Basidiomycota
- Class: Agaricomycetes
- Order: Agaricales
- Family: Omphalotaceae
- Genus: Rhodocollybia
- Species: R. fodiens

Binomial name
- Rhodocollybia fodiens (Kalchbr.) Antonín & Noordel.

= Rhodocollybia fodiens =

Species of fungus

Rhodocollybia fodiens Mycological characteristics

Rhodocollybia fodiens is a species of fungus in the mushroom family Omphalotaceae.
