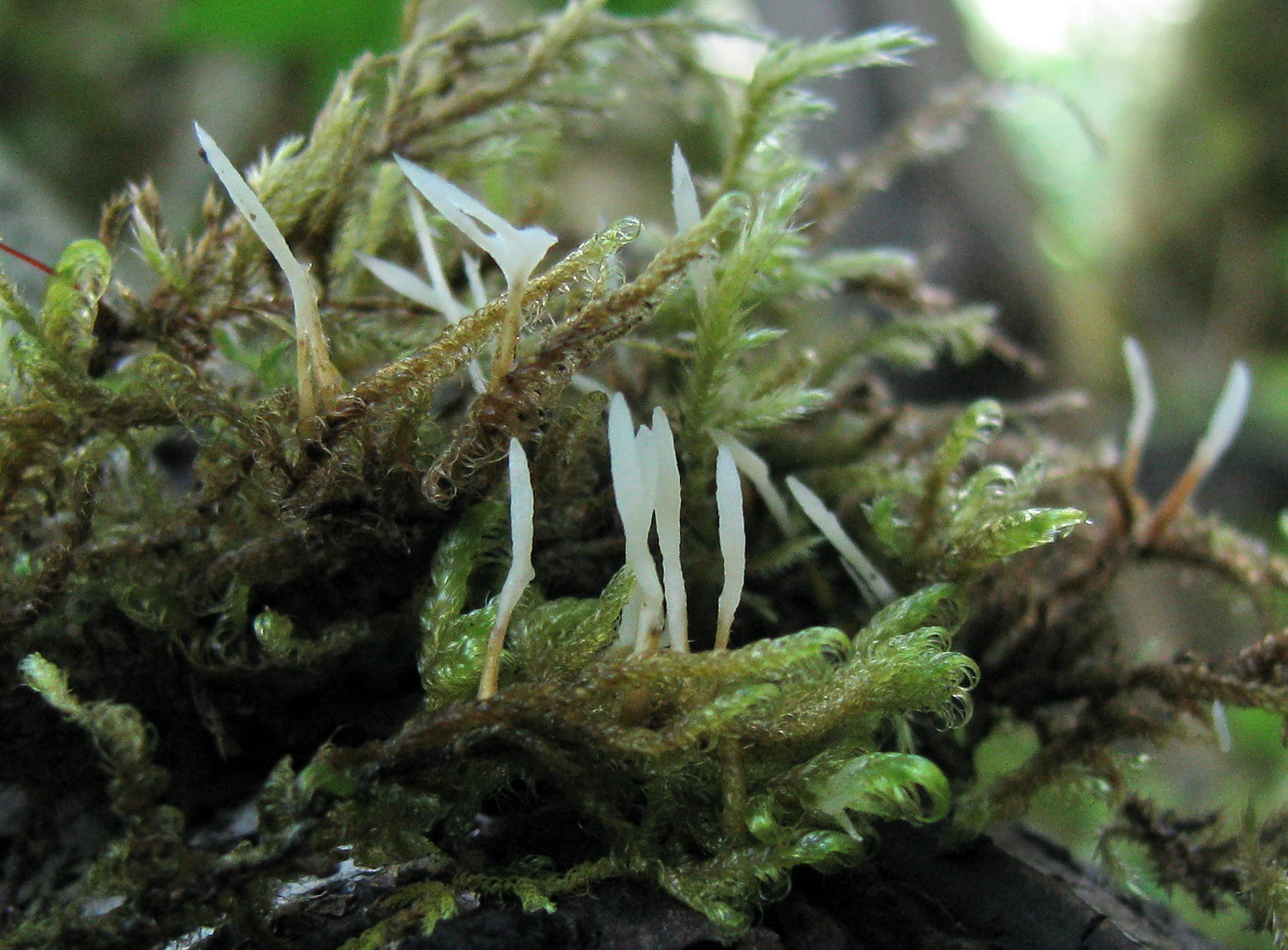
- Eocronartium muscicola, Vancouver Island, Canada

Scientific classification
- Kingdom: Fungi
- Division: Basidiomycota
- Class: Pucciniomycetes
- Order: Platygloeales; R.T. Moore (1990)

Families
- Eocronartiaceae; Platygloeaceae

= Platygloeales =

Order of fungi

The Platygloeales are an order of fungi in the class Pucciniomycetes. Species in the order have auricularioid basidia (tubular with lateral septa) and are typically plant parasites on mosses, ferns, and angiosperms, though Platygloea species appear to be saprotrophic.

== Taxonomy ==
=== History ===
The order was described in 1990 by American mycologist Royall T. Moore to accommodate fungi with auricularioid (laterally septate) basidia and simple septal pores that were formerly placed in the Auriculariaceae. The latter group was distinguished by having dolipore (not simple) septa. As such, Moore's Platygloeales included not only Platygloea, but genera such as Helicobasidium, Mycogloea, and Kriegeria. Subsequently, the order was extended to include most auricularioid fungi not included in the Auriculariaceae, including the genera Colacogloea, Naohidea, and Occultifur.

=== Current status ===
Molecular research, based on cladistic analysis of DNA sequences, has restricted the Platygloeales sensu stricto to a small group of related genera, placing genera formerly classified in the Platygloeales into various other orders, including the Agaricostilbales, Cystobasidiales, Helicobasidiales, Kriegeriales, and Naohideales.
