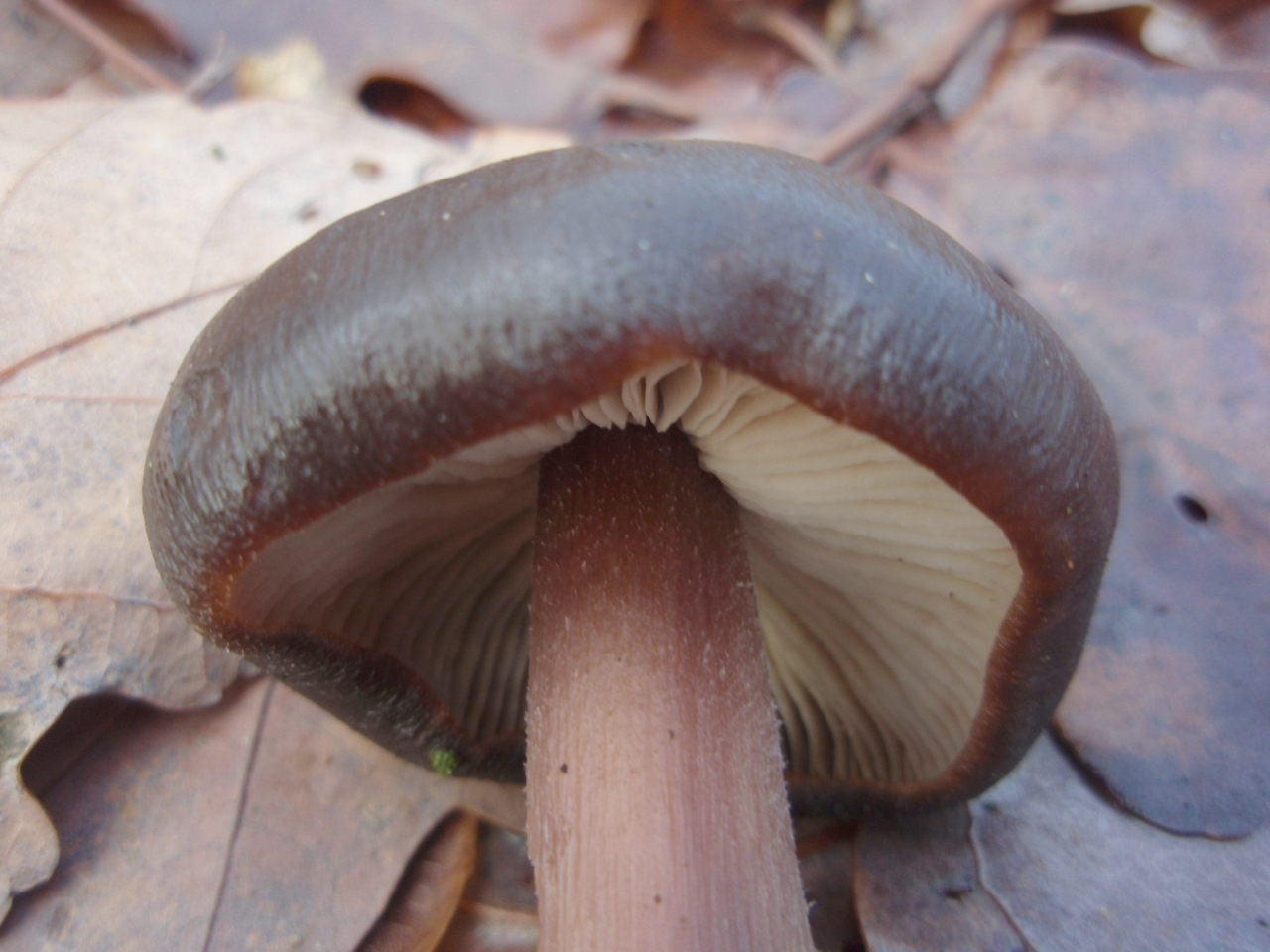
- Rhodocollybia butyracea

Scientific classification
- Kingdom: Fungi
- Division: Basidiomycota
- Class: Agaricomycetes
- Order: Agaricales
- Family: Omphalotaceae
- Genus: Rhodocollybia; Singer

Type species
- Rhodocollybia maculata (Fr.) Singer

Species
- Approx. 30 species – see text.

= Rhodocollybia =

Genus of fungi

Rhodocollybia is a genus of Basidiomycete mushroom. Species in this genus, formerly classified as a subgenus in Collybia, have fairly large caps (typically larger than 5 centimetres (2.0 in) broad), and have a pinkish-tinted spore print. Microscopically, they are characterized by having spores and basidia that are dextrinoid—staining deep reddish to reddish-brown with Melzer's reagent when tested for amyloidity. Rhodocollybia species are commonly found in temperate North America and Europe, and infrequently in Central and South America.

== Taxonomy ==
The genus name Rhodocollybia was first used by Rolf Singer in 1939 to describe those species of Collybia with a pink spore deposit; in later works he considered the genera equivalent (synonymous) and called them Collybia. In 1997, Antonín and Noordeloos studied various members of Collybia using phylogenetic analysis, and reorganized the genus, dividing species into either Collybia, Gymnopus, or Rhodocollybia.

== Description ==
The caps of species in this genus are relatively large, often more than 5 centimetres (2.0 in) in diameter, convex in shape but in maturity flattening, or often developing a shallow umbo–a mound in the center of the cap. The surface of the cap is often uneven, and slimy or slippery (lubricous) to the touch. The cap color can range from whitish to dark reddish brown. The gills are whitish to pinkish cream in color, and have an adnexed attachment to the stem. The stem is usually long and thick (relative to the cap diameter), often more than 7 centimetres (2.8 in) long and at least 0.5 centimetres (0.2 in) thick; the color usually whitish or the same color as the gills. This type of agaric, collybioid mushroom has pale spore deposits which range from pinkish buff to pinkish cream.

Microscopic features

Spores in this species are typically spherical to ellipsoid in shape, and translucent (hyaline). Rhodocollybia is characterized by having an endosporium (inner wall of the spore) that is dextrinoid (staining yellowish or reddish-brown in iodine-containing solutions such as Melzer's reagent), and sometimes cyanophilous. The spore wall may be thin to thick (up to 0.5 μm).

== Habitat and distribution ==
Rhodocollybia species are found growing scattered to clustered together on forest duff or on well-rotted wood, in coniferous forests. Species of Rhodocollybia can be found in various parts of the United States, including Maine, Hawaii, and in California in conifer woods on needle duff or on rotting wood. Species in this genus can also be found in such European countries as Poland and the Czech Republic. A 1989 work by mycologist Roy Halling reported three neotropical species: R. turpis from Colombia and Costa Rica, C. popayanica from Colombia, and C. sleumeri from Ecuador.

== Species ==
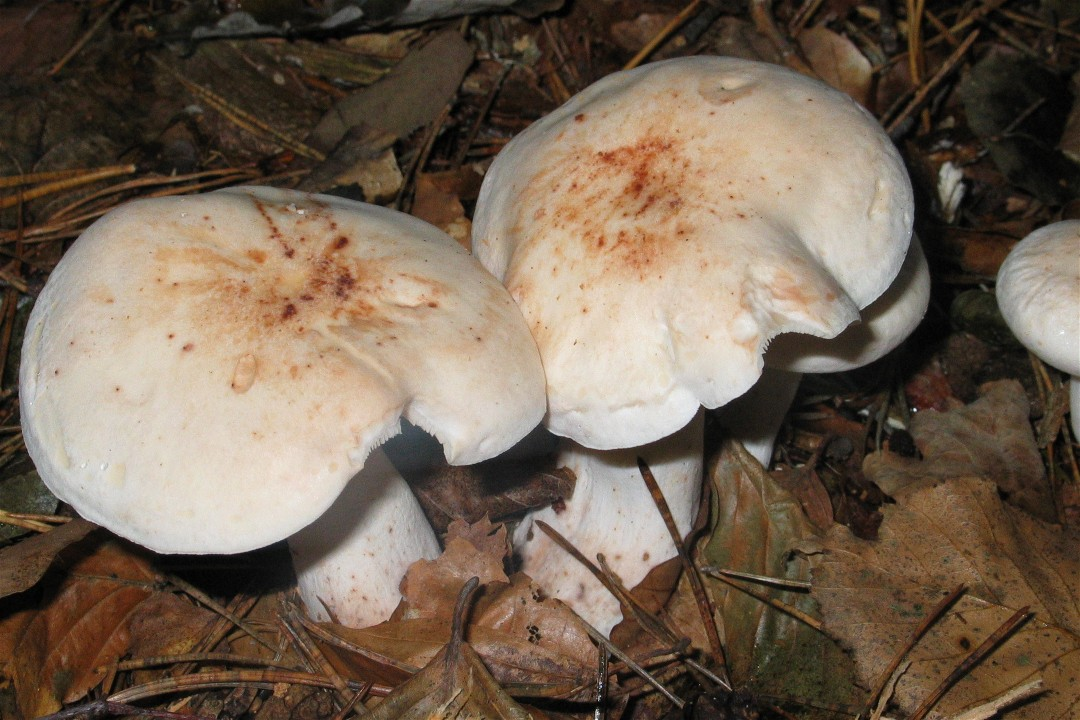
R. maculata

The following species are recognised in the genus Rhodocollybia:

- Rhodocollybia amica
- Rhodocollybia antioquiana
- Rhodocollybia asema
- Rhodocollybia badiialba
- Rhodocollybia brevipes
- Rhodocollybia butyracea (buttery Collybia)
- Rhodocollybia ciliatomarginata
- Rhodocollybia clavipes
- Rhodocollybia delicata
- Rhodocollybia dotae
- Rhodocollybia eucalyptorum
- Rhodocollybia filamentosa
- Rhodocollybia fodiens
- Rhodocollybia giselae - Found in the Mediterranean region of Europe (Italy and France), grows in thermophilous forests with holm oak (Quercus ilex), Strawberry trees (Arbutus unedo) and Pine trees (genus Pinus).
- Rhodocollybia incarnata
- Rhodocollybia laulaha
- Rhodocollybia lentinoides
- Rhodocollybia lignitilis
- Rhodocollybia maculata (spotted toughshank)
- Rhodocollybia meridana
- Rhodocollybia monticola
- Rhodocollybia olivaceogrisea
- Rhodocollybia oregonensis
- Rhodocollybia pandipes
- Rhodocollybia popayanica
- Rhodocollybia prolixa
- Rhodocollybia purpurata
- Rhodocollybia rufovinosa
- Rhodocollybia sleumeri
- Rhodocollybia spissa
- Rhodocollybia stenosperma
- Rhodocollybia subnigra
- Rhodocollybia subsulcatipes
- Rhodocollybia tablensis
- Rhodocollybia tenuipes
- Rhodocollybia turpis - Cap 8 to 11 centimetres (3.1 to 4.3 in) in diameter, light yellow in youth but turning pale orange with brown streaks and spots in maturity. Found in Colombia.
- Rhodocollybia unakensis
- Rhodocollybia utrorensis
