= Ptechetelium =

Scientific classification
- Kingdom: Fungi
- Division: Basidiomycota
- Class: Pucciniomycetes
- Order: Platygloeales
- Family: Eocronartiaceae
- Genus: Ptechetelium; Oberw. & Bandoni (1984)
- Species: P. cyatheae

Binomial name
- Ptechetelium cyatheae (Syd.) Oberw. & Bandoni (1984)

Synonyms
- Herpobasidium cyatheae Syd. (1939); Platycarpa boiiviensis Couch (1949)

Species of fungus

Ptechetelium cyatheae is a species of fungus belonging to the order Platygloeales. It is currently the only species in the monotypic genus Ptechetelium. The species forms effused basidiocarps (fruit bodies) on ferns, on which it is parasitic.

The known host for Ptechetelium cyatheae is the tree fern Cyathea stuebelii. The fungus parasitizes host leaves, producing basidiocarps as small whitish patches that emerge through the stomata. Microscopically, the basidia are auricularioid (tubular with lateral septa) and emerge from thick-walled probasidia. The species has seldom been collected and is only known from Bolivia and Ecuador.
