= Eleutherascus =

Scientific classification
- Kingdom: Fungi
- Division: Ascomycota
- Class: Pezizomycetes
- Order: Pezizales
- Family: Ascodesmidaceae
- Genus: Eleutherascus; Arx (1971)

Type species
- Eleutherascus lectardii (Nicot) Arx (1971)

Species
- E. cristatus; E. lectardii; E. peruvianus; E. tuberculatus

Synonyms
- Hemiascosporium L.R.Batra (1973)

Genus of fungi

Eleutherascus is a genus of fungi in the family Ascodesmidaceae. It was described by mycologist Josef Adolf von Arx in 1971.
