= Platygloeaceae =

Scientific classification
- Kingdom: Fungi
- Division: Basidiomycota
- Class: Pucciniomycetes
- Order: Platygloeales
- Family: Platygloeaceae; Racib. (1909)

Genera
- Glomerogloea; Glomopsis; Insolibasidium; Platygloea

Family of fungi

The Platygloeaceae are a family of fungi in the class Pucciniomycetes. Species in the family have auricularioid basidia (tubular with lateral septa) and are typically plant parasites on angiosperms, though Platygloea species appear to be saprotrophic.
