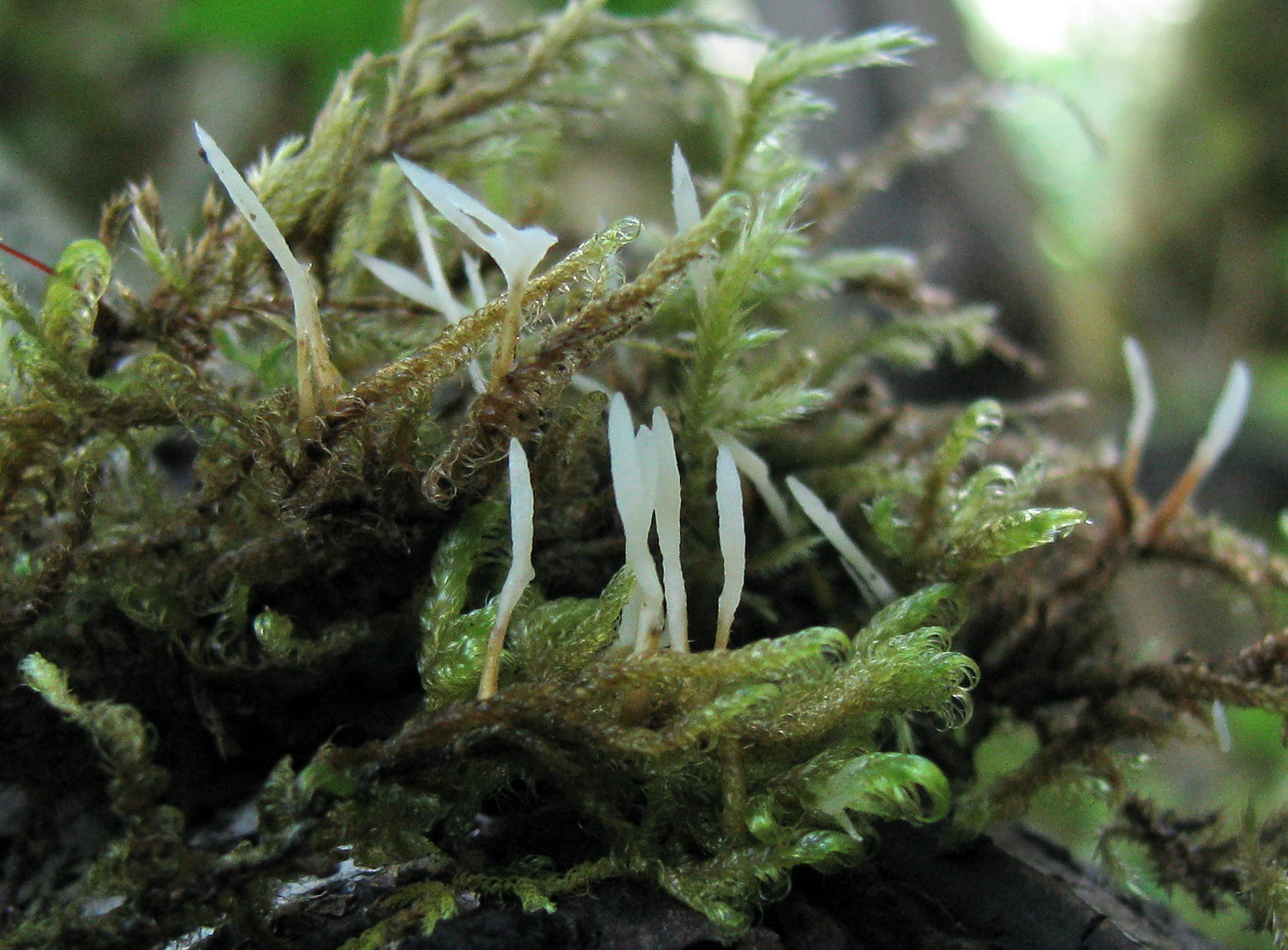
- Eocronartium muscicola, Canada

Scientific classification
- Kingdom: Fungi
- Division: Basidiomycota
- Class: Pucciniomycetes
- Order: Platygloeales
- Family: Eocronartiaceae; Jülich (1982)

Genera
- Eocronartium; Herpobasidium; Jola; Platycarpa; Ptechetelium

= Eocronartiaceae =

Family of fungi

The Eocronartiaceae are a family of fungi in the class Pucciniomycetes. Species in the family have auricularioid basidia (tubular with lateral septa) and are typically plant parasites on ferns and mosses.
