= Trimorphomycetaceae =

Scientific classification
- Kingdom: Fungi
- Division: Basidiomycota
- Class: Tremellomycetes
- Order: Tremellales
- Family: Trimorphomycetaceae; X.Z. Liu, F.Y. Bai, M. Groenew. & Boekhout (2015)

Genera
- Carlosrosaea; Saitozyma; Sugitazyma; Trimorphomyces

Family of fungi

The Trimorphomycetaceae are a family of fungi in the order Tremellales. The family currently contains four genera. Some species produce filamentous sexual states and are parasites of other fungi. Most, however, are only known from their yeast states.
