= Ascodesmis =

Scientific classification
- Kingdom: Fungi
- Division: Ascomycota
- Class: Pezizomycetes
- Order: Pezizales
- Family: Ascodesmidaceae
- Genus: Ascodesmis; Tiegh. (1876)

Type species
- Ascodesmis aurea Tiegh. (1876)

Genus of fungi

Ascodesmis is a genus of fungi in the family Ascodesmidaceae. It was described by French botanist Philippe Édouard Léon Van Tieghem in 1876. Species in the genus are coprophilous, and are characterized by the absence of an excipulum (tissues containing the hymenium of a fruit body).

== Species ==
- Ascodesmis aurea
- Ascodesmis echinulata
- Ascodesmis macrospora
- Ascodesmis microscopica
- Ascodesmis nana
- Ascodesmis nigricans
- Ascodesmis obristii
- Ascodesmis porcina
- Ascodesmis reticulata
- Ascodesmis sphaerospora
- Ascodesmis volutelloides
