= Cystobasidiaceae =

Scientific classification
- Kingdom: Fungi
- Division: Basidiomycota
- Class: Cystobasidiomycetes
- Order: Cystobasidiales
- Family: Cystobasidiaceae; Gäum. (1926)

Genera
- Cystobasidium; Occultifur

Family of fungi

The Cystobasidiaceae are a family of fungi in the order Cystobasidiales. The family currently comprises two genera, both of which contain fungal parasites with auricularioid (laterally septate) basidia, some of which are known only from their yeast states.
