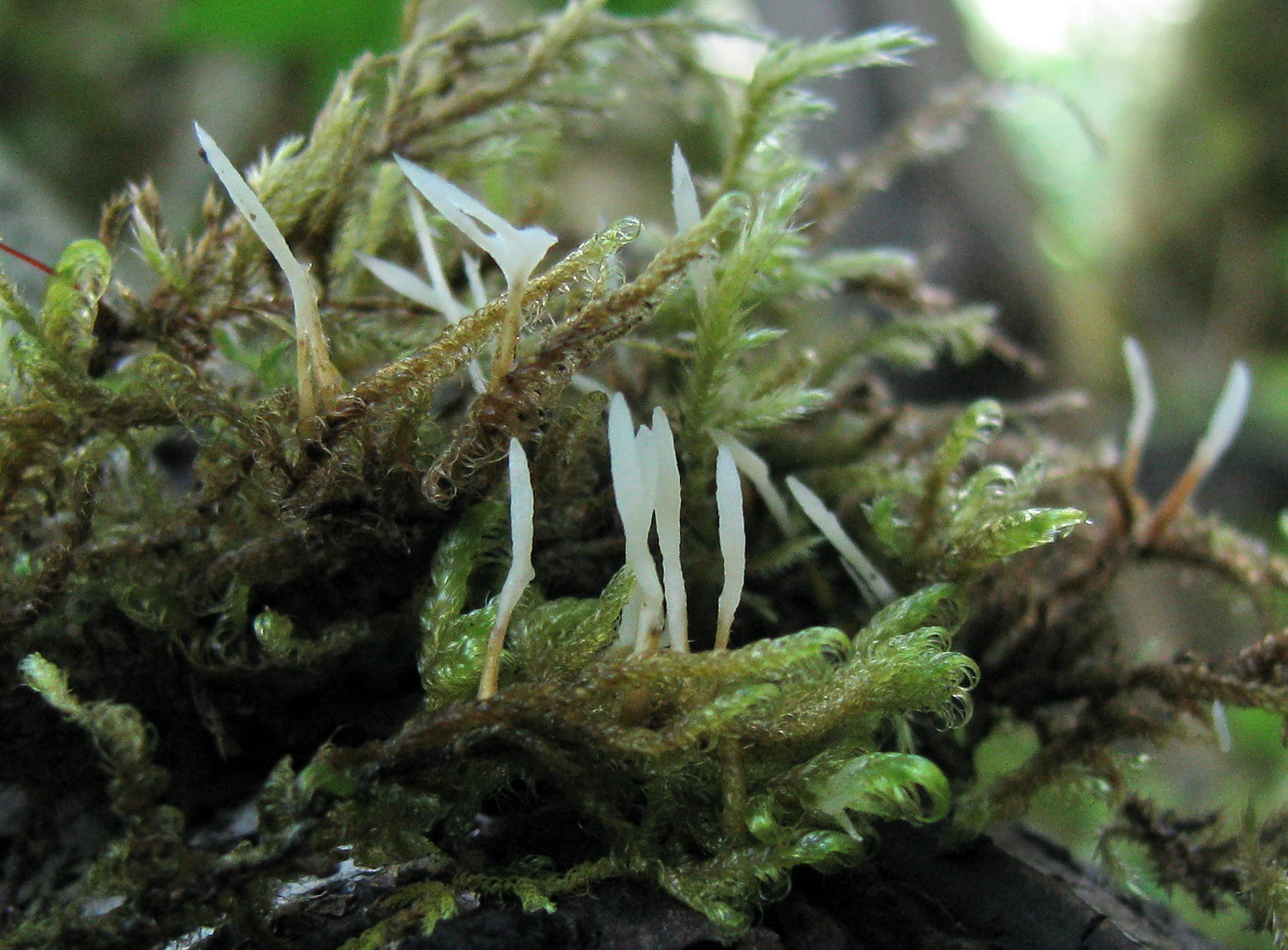
- Eocronartium muscicola Vancouver Island, British Columbia, Canada

Scientific classification
- Kingdom: Fungi
- Division: Basidiomycota
- Class: Pucciniomycetes
- Order: Platygloeales
- Family: Eocronartiaceae
- Genus: Eocronartium; G.F. Atk. (1902)
- Species: E. muscicola

Binomial name
- Eocronartium muscicola (Pers.) Fitzp. (1918)

Synonyms
- Clavaria muscicola Pers., Observ. mycol. (Lipsiae) 2: 60 (1800); Clavaria muscigena P. Karst., Not. Sällsk. Fauna et Fl. Fenn. Förh. 9: 373 (1868); Eocronartium muscigena (Sacc.) Höhn., Sber. Akad. Wiss. Wien, Math.-naturw. Kl., Abt. 1 118: 1463 (1909); Eocronartium typhuloides G.F. Atk., J. Mycol. 8(3): 107 (1902); Helicobasidium typhuloides (G.F. Atk.) Pat., Bull. Soc. mycol. Fr. 36: 176 (1920); Helicobasidium typhuloides var. orientale Pat., Bull. Soc. mycol. Fr. 36: 176 (1920); Pistillaria muscicola (Pers.) Fr., Syst. mycol. (Lundae) 1: 498 (1821); Typhula muscicola (Pers.) Fr., Epicr. syst. mycol. (Upsaliae): 585 (1838)

= Eocronartium =

Genus of fungi

Eocronartium muscicola is a species of fungus belonging to the order Platygloeales. It is currently the only species in the monotypic genus Eocronartium. In the UK its recommended English name is moss rust. The species forms clavarioid basidiocarps (fruit bodies) on mosses, on which it is parasitic.

At least 21 moss species, all in the subclass Bryidae, are recorded as hosts for Eocronartium muscicola. The fungus parasitizes its host through its gametophytic transfer cells. The species appears to be widespread, with most reports from Europe, North and South America.
