= Trimorphomyces =

Scientific classification
- Kingdom: Fungi
- Division: Basidiomycota
- Class: Tremellomycetes
- Order: Tremellales
- Family: Trimorphomycetaceae
- Genus: Trimorphomyces; Bandoni & Oberw.

Type species
- Trimorphomyces papilionaceus Bandoni & Oberw.

Genus of fungi

Trimorphomyces is a genus of fungi in the family Trimorphomycetaceae. The genus currently contains two species. The type species is a parasite of another fungus in the genus Arthrinium, forming small gelatinous basidiocarps (fruit bodies) containing distinctive twinned conidia.
