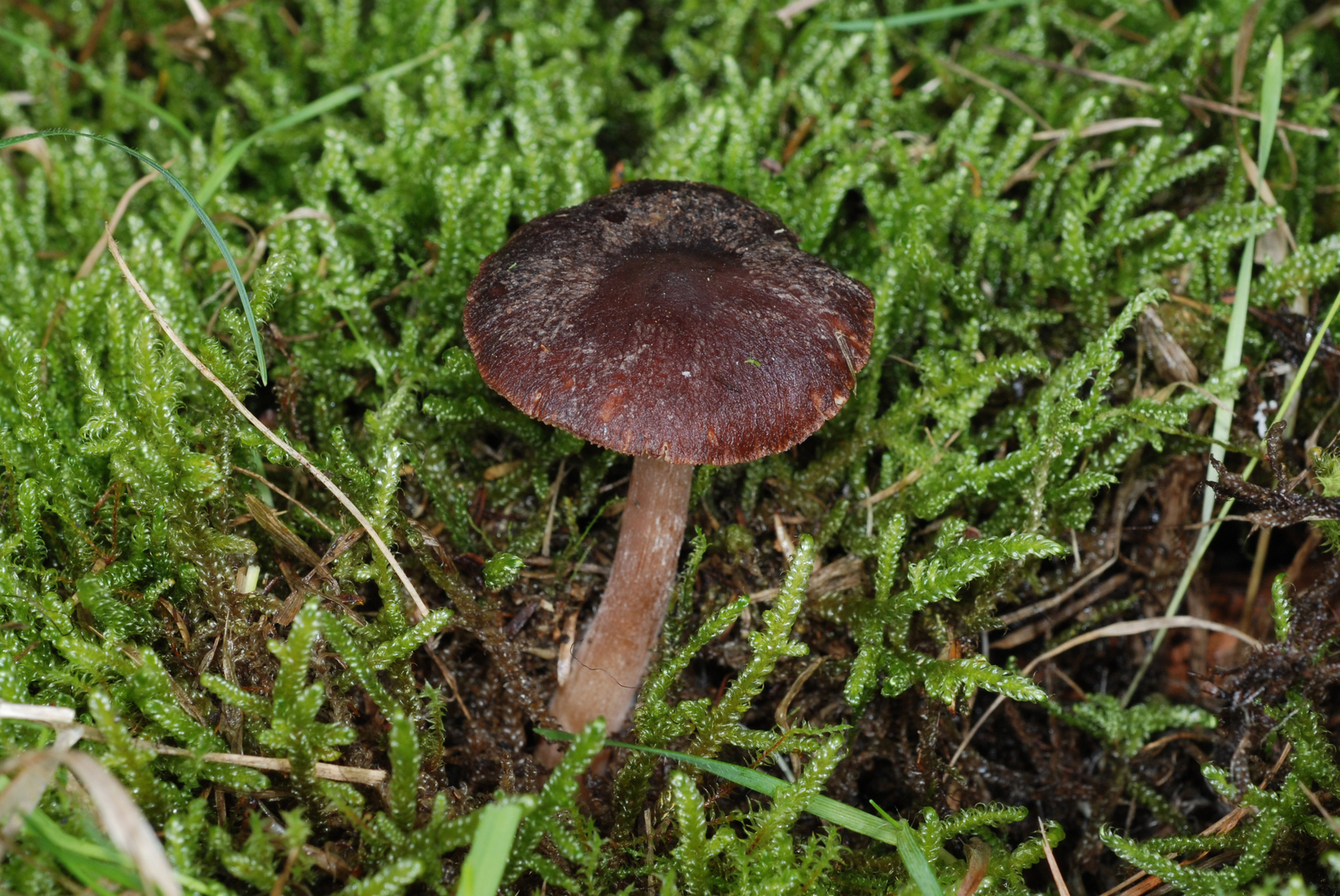
- Rhodocollybia purpurata fruiting body

Scientific classification
- Kingdom: Fungi
- Division: Basidiomycota
- Class: Agaricomycetes
- Order: Agaricales
- Family: Omphalotaceae
- Genus: Rhodocollybia
- Species: R. purpurata

Binomial name
- Rhodocollybia purpurata G.Stev. (J.A. Cooper) (2014)

Synonyms
- Pluteus purpuratus G.Stev. (1962); Lepiotula purpurata G.Stev. (E.Horak) (1971); Lepiota purpurata G.Stev. (E.Horak) (1981)

= Rhodocollybia purpurata =

Species of fungus

Rhodocollybia purpurata
- Mycological characteristics
- Gills on hymenium
- Cap is flat or umbonate
- Hymenium is adnexed or free
- Spore print is cream
- Ecology is saprotrophic
- Edibility is unknown

Rhodocollybia purpurata is a species of mushroom of the family Omphalotaceae. It was first described by New Zealand mycologist Greta Stevenson in 1962. The species was later reclassified into the genus Rhodocollybia in 2014. The fungus is native to New Zealand, where it is saprotrophic, meaning it obtains nutrients by breaking down organic material. The fruiting bodies can be found in leaf litter on soil or in mossy areas.

== Taxonomy ==
The species was first described by the New Zealand mycologist Greta Stevenson in 1962, as Pluteus purpuratus. The species was reclassified as Lepiotula purpurata in 1971 by Egon Horak, citing the fruiting bodies' free gills (lamella) which led him to believe it to be better placed in the genus Lepiotula. The species was reclassified again in 1981 by Horak as Lepiota purpurata. In a 2014 study, Jerry Cooper moved the species to Rhodocollybia due to phylogenetic analysis and spore characteristics (except the cream spore print which is unusual for Rhodocollybia). R. purpurata was found to be closely related to R. pandipes and R. ciliatomarginata from Costa Rica and India, respectively.

== Description ==
The fruit bodies (basidiocarps) of R. purpurata have caps (pilei) which reach 2.5–6.5 centimetres (0.98–2.56 inches) in diameter. They can vary in colour from greyish magenta, cream to pale pink, and nearly black to violet in young specimens. The surface is fibrillose and rugulose, and the cap shape is flat or nearly umbonate. The lamella (gills) are normally grey with tints of orange, brown, or red. They are crowded, and the attachment is adnexed to nearly free. The stipe measures 30–70 × 4–8 mm at the apex, with the base reaching 8–24 mm in diameter. The spore print is cream. The spores are tear-shaped and measure 7.7 × 3.7 µm. The basidia measure 25–30 × 6–8 µm. The hyphae measure 3– µm in diameter. The mushroom does not have a significant smell or taste.

== Distribution and habitat ==
Rhodocollybia purpurata is native to New Zealand. Its range covers the North and South Islands. Rhodocollybia species are saprotrophic, meaning they obtain nutrients by breaking down organic material. R. purpurata is found in forests and shrublands consisting of Nothofagus, Leptospermum, or Kunzea. It has been recorded growing in groups in leaf litter on soil of those plants, and has also been recorded growing on mossy areas and trunks.

== Works cited ==
Journals

- Cooper, J.A. (2014). "New species and combinations of some New Zealand agarics belonging to Clitopilus, Lyophyllum, Gerhardtia, Clitocybe, Hydnangium, Mycena, Rhodocollybia and Gerronema" (PDF). Mycosphere. 5 (2): 263–288. doi:10.5943/mycosphere/5/2/2.
- Hobbie, Erik A.; van Diepen, Linda T. A.; Lilleskov, Erik A.; Ouimette, Andrew P.; Finzi, Adrien C.; Hofmockel, Kirsten S. (2014). "Fungal Functioning in a Pine Forest: Evidence from a 15 N‐Labeled Global Change Experiment". New Phytologist. 201 (4): 1431–1439. doi:10.1111/nph.12578. ISSN 0028-646X.
- Horak, E. (1971). "A Contribution Towards the Revision of the Agaricales (Fungi) From New Zealand". New Zealand Journal of Botany. 9 (3): 402–462. doi:10.1080/0028825X.1971.10430193. ISSN 0028-825X.
- Horak, E. (1980). "Fungi Agaricini Novazelandiae IX. Lepiotula (Maire) Locquin ex Horak". New Zealand Journal of Botany. 18 (2): 183–188. doi:10.1080/0028825X.1980.10426915. ISSN 0028-825X.
- Latha, K. P. Deepna; Raj, K. N. Anil; Manimohan, Patinjareveettil (2018). "Two new species of Rhodocollybia from tropical India". Phytotaxa. 340 (2). Magnolia Press. doi:10.11646/phytotaxa.340.2.4. ISSN 1179-3163.
- Stevenson, Greta (1962). "The Agaricales of New Zealand: II". Kew Bulletin. 16 (1): 65. doi:10.2307/4120348.
