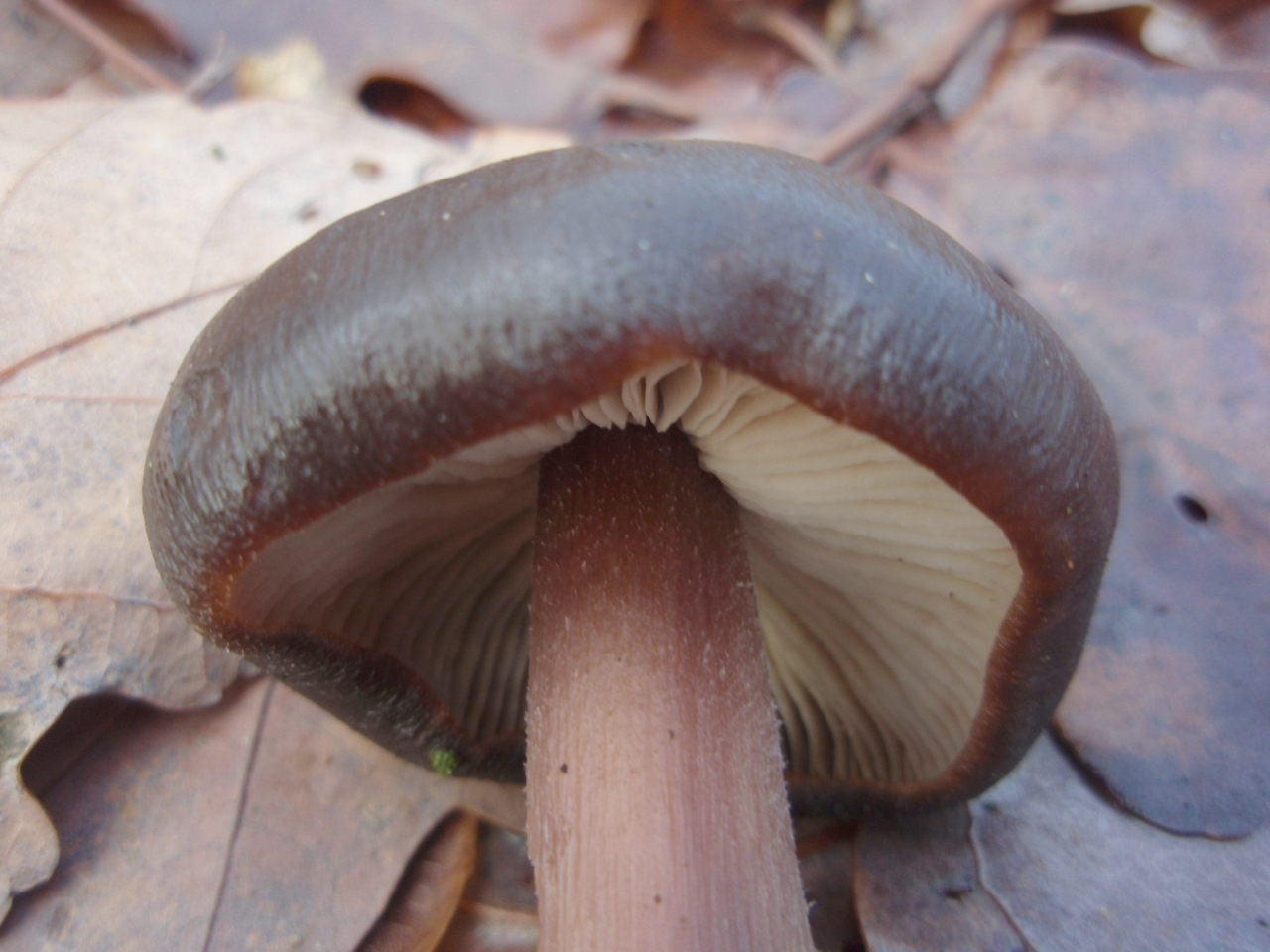

Scientific classification
- Kingdom: Fungi
- Division: Basidiomycota
- Class: Agaricomycetes
- Order: Agaricales
- Family: Omphalotaceae
- Genus: Rhodocollybia
- Species: R. butyracea

Binomial name
- Rhodocollybia butyracea (Bull.: Fr.) Lennox

Synonyms
- Collybia butyracea (Bull.: Fr.) Quélet

= Rhodocollybia butyracea =

Species of fungus

Rhodocollybia butyracea Mycological characteristics
- Gills on hymenium
- Cap is convex or flat
- Hymenium is adnexed or free
- Stipe is bare
- Spore print is cream to buff
- Ecology is saprotrophic
- Edibility is edible

Rhodocollybia butyracea, commonly known as the buttery collybia, is a species of fungus in the family Omphalotaceae. It has a number of subspecies.

== Description ==
The cap is 2 to 10 centimetres (3/4 to 4 in) across. It is convex and becomes broadly convex or almost flat. When fresh, this species is smooth and moist. It has a reddish-brown colour fading to cinnamon.

The gills are either free from the stem, or narrowly attached. They range from close to crowded and are whitish. Occasionally, they develop a pinkish tone as they age, and often form fine, jagged edges.

The stem is up to 10 cm long and 1 cm thick. It is normally somewhat club-shaped. It can either be moist or dry.

The flesh of this species is white. There is no distinctive odor or taste.

The spores are pale yellowish, pale pinkish, or white.

=== Similar species ===
It can resemble R. badiialba, R. prolixa, and Gymnopus dryophilus.

== Habitat ==
Rhodocollybia butyracea is widely distributed in North America.

== Ecology ==
This species is saprobic. It decomposes litter from conifers, usually that of the genus Pinus, and occasionally hardwoods.

== Edibility ==
This mushroom is edible, but unsubstantial, and can resemble inedible species.

== Gallery ==
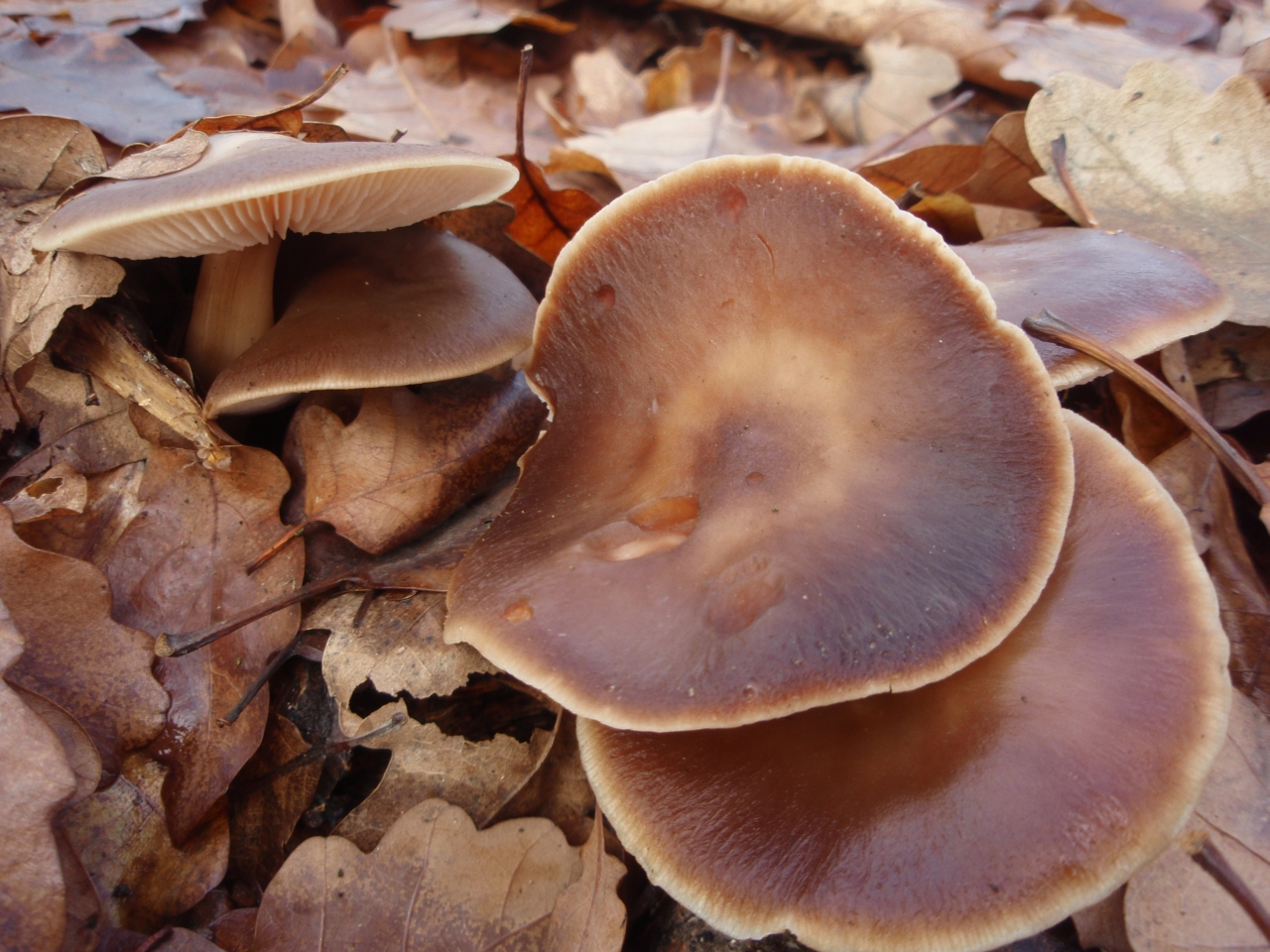

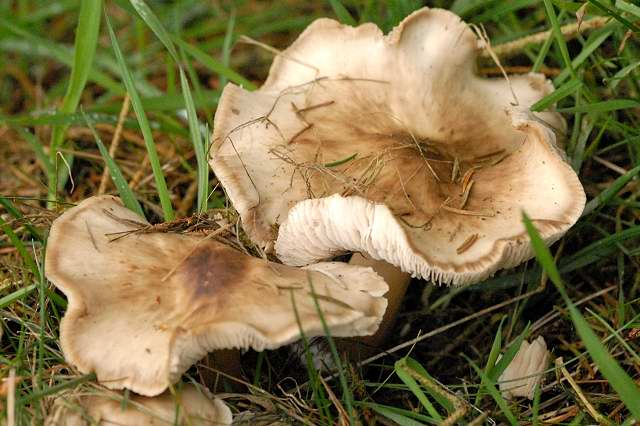

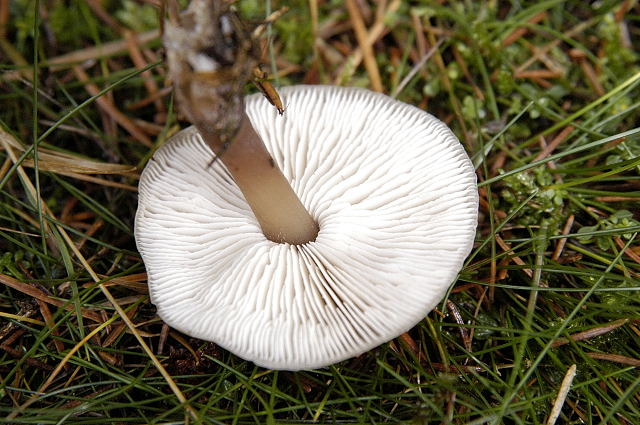

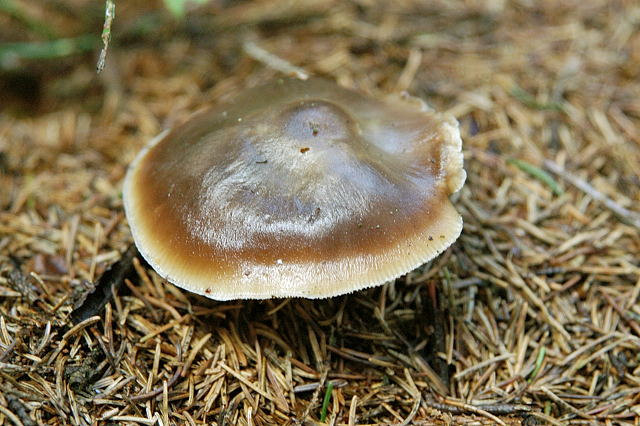

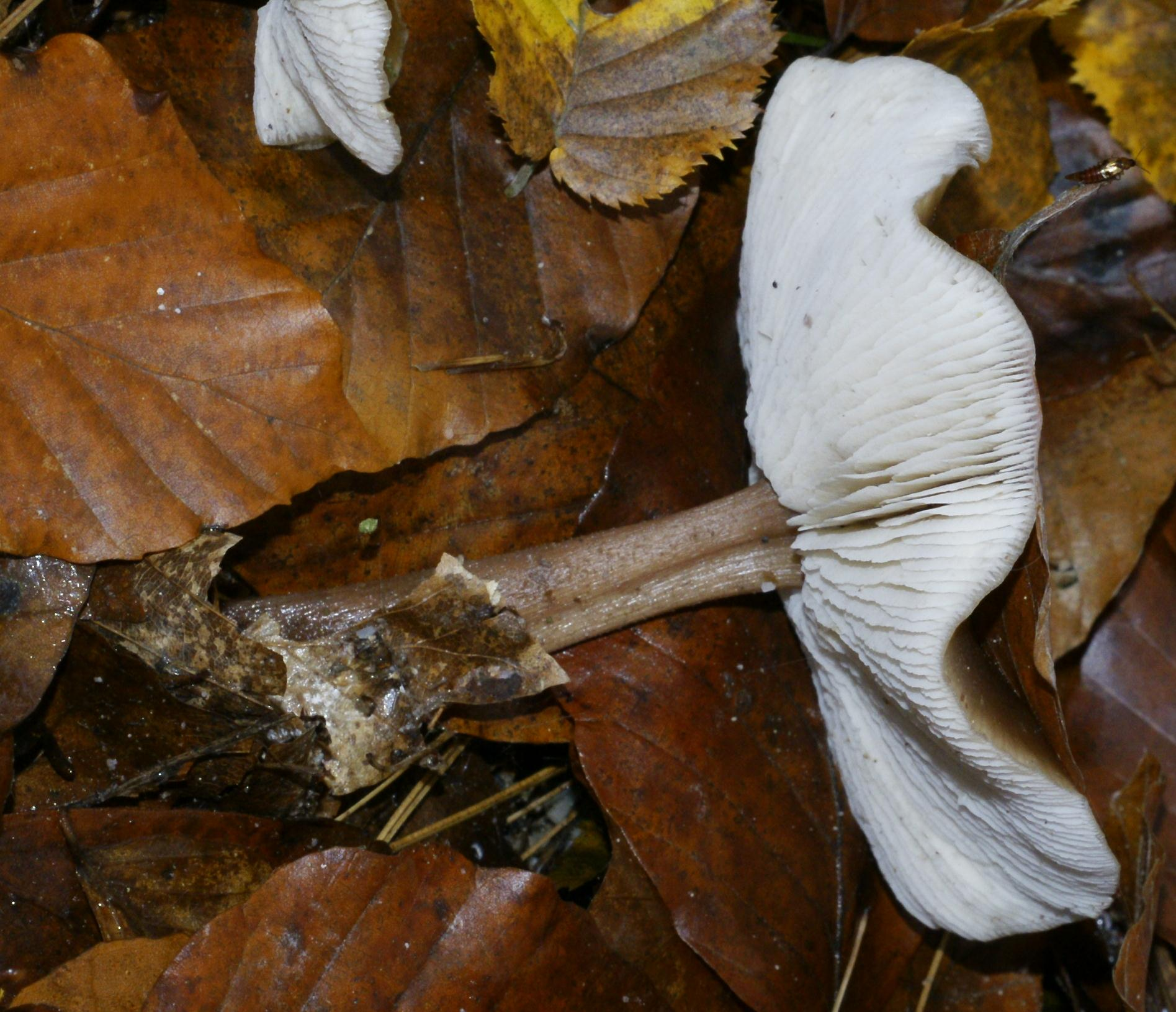
