= Robert Joseph Bandoni =

American mycologist

- Born: November 9, 1926; Weeks, Nevada
- Died: May 18, 2009 (aged 82); Vancouver, British Columbia, Canada
- Education: University of Nevada
- Known for: Taxonomy of the Heterobasidiomycetes
- Scientific career
- Fields: Mycology
- Thesis: Taxonomic studies of the genus Tremella (Tremellaceae) (1957)
- Doctoral advisor: George Willard Martin
- Author abbrev. (botany): Bandoni

Robert Joseph Bandoni (11 November 1926 – 5 May 2009) was a mycologist who specialized on the taxonomy and morphology of the heterobasidiomycetes ("jelly fungi").

During his 50 years as professor at the University of British Columbia, he wrote over 80 scientific publications as well as several books. He was awarded the title of professor emeritus in 1989. In 1990 the Canadian Botanical Association awarded him the George Lawson Medal. Bandoni died on May 18, 2009, in Vancouver, British Columbia, after suffering a stroke.

== Biography ==
Robert "Bob" Joseph Bandoni was born November 9, 1926, in Weeks, Nevada, to Giuseppe and Albina Bandoni. He went to high school in Hawthorne, Nevada, and received a Bachelor of Science from the University of Nevada in 1953. He then studied under George Willard Martin at the University of Iowa and received his Ph.D. in 1957. The title of his thesis was: "Taxonomic studies of the genus Tremella (Tremellaceae). That same year, he received the Gertrude S. Burlingham Fellowship at the New York Botanical Garden and became assistant professor of Botany at the University of Wichita. In 1958 Bandoni joined the Botany faculty at the University of British Columbia (UBC). He helped found the Vancouver Mycological Society in the 1970s. He was awarded the status of professor emeritus in 1989. Bandoni died on May 18, 2009 from a stroke.

== Mycological and botanical contributions ==
Bandoni mainly studied the heterobasidiomycetes, commonly known as the "Jelly Fungi". His early publications were of a classical taxonomical nature, writing descriptions of the macro- and micro-morphology via the light microscope. In the early 1970s Bandoni started studying aquatic fungi that occur in terrestrial environments. He published a paper in the journal Science that explained how spores can travel upwards on a monolayer of water on a leaf surface. In the 1980s Bandoni collaborated with Franz Oberwinkler and colleagues at the University of Tübingen to produce over 20 papers on the Jelly Fungi and allies. They described new species, genera, families and orders. They used TEM and SEM micrographs to investigate the significance of septal pore structures, began revising the classical phylogenetic classification and to demonstrate parasitism between Jelly Fungi and other fungi. Bandoni collaborated with mycologists in Japan and other Asian countries. He was research fellow in 1983 at the University of Tsukuba and spent a sabbatical year at the University of Osaka. He wrote two field guides to Thailand mushrooms. Bandoni contributed to multiple publications on taxonomy in the Jelly Fungi up until his death.

In addition to scientific publications, Bandoni also contributed to several influential books. He contributed to Plant diversity: An evolutionary approach; a book written by the UBC Botany Faculty that "put the Botany Department onto the North American textbook bestseller list for almost a decade". He also contributed to the 570 page textbook Nonvascular plants: An evolutionary survey. In 1964 he co-authored with Adam Szczawinski a field guide titled Guide to common mushrooms of British Columbia.

== Taxa described ==
- Achroomyces abditus (Bandoni) Hauerslev 1993
- Agaricostilbum hyphaenes (Har. & Pat.) Oberw. & Bandoni 1982
- Aleurodiscus gigasporus Ginns & Bandoni 1991
- Aleurodiscus subglobosporus Ginns & Bandoni 1991
- Atractiella columbiana Bandoni & Inderb. 2002
- Atractiella delectans (Möller) Oberw. & Bandoni 1982
- Atractiella solani (Cohn & J. Schröt.) Oberw. & Bandoni 1982
- Atractiellales Oberw. & Bandoni 1982
- Atractogloea Oberw. & Bandoni 1982
- Atractogloea stillata Oberw. & Bandoni 1982
- Bullera aurantiaca B.N. Johri & Bandoni 1984
- Bullera globispora B.N. Johri & Bandoni 1984
- Bullera miyagiana Nakase, Itoh, Takem. & Bandoni 1990
- Bullera salicina B.N. Johri & Bandoni 1984
- Calacogloea Oberw. & Bandoni 1991
- Calacogloea peniophorae Oberw. & Bandoni 1991
- Carcinomyces Oberw. & Bandoni 1982
- Carcinomyces effibulatus (Ginns & Sunhede) Oberw. & Bandoni 1982
- Carcinomyces mycetophilus (Peck) Oberw. & Bandoni 1982
- Carcinomycetaceae Oberw. & Bandoni 1982
- Chionosphaera phylaciicola (Seifert & Bandoni) R. Kirschner & Oberw. 2001
- Chionosphaeraceae Oberw. & Bandoni 1982
- Christiansenia subgen. Carcinomyces (Oberw. & Bandoni) F. Rath 1991
- Cladoconidium Bandoni & Tubaki 1985
- Cladoconidium articulatum Bandoni & Tubaki 1985
- Colacogloea Oberw. & Bandoni 1991
- Colacogloea allantospora Ginns & Bandoni 2002
- Colacogloea peniophorae (Bourdot & Galzin) Oberw. & Bandoni 1991
- Cystofilobasidiaceae K. Wells & Bandoni 2001
- Cystofilobasidium Oberw. & Bandoni 1983
- Cystofilobasidium bisporidii (Fell, I.L. Hunter & Tallman) Oberw. & Bandoni 1983
- Cystofilobasidium bisporidiis (Fell, I.L. Hunter & Tallman) Oberw. & Bandoni 1983
- Cystofilobasidium capitatum (Fell, I.L. Hunter & Tallman) Oberw. & Bandoni 1983
- Dacrymyces aquaticus Bandoni & G.C. Hughes 1984
- Dioszegia aurantiaca (B.N. Johri & Bandoni) M. Takash., T. Deák & Nakase 2001
- Entomocorticium H.S. Whitney, Bandoni & Oberw. 1987
- Entomocorticium dendroctoni H.S. Whitney, Bandoni & Oberw. 1987
- Exidiopsis paniculata K. Wells & Bandoni 1987
- Exidiopsis punicea K. Wells & Bandoni 1987
- Fibulobasidium Bandoni 1979
- Fibulobasidium inconspicuum Bandoni 1979
- Fibulobasidium sirobasidioides Bandoni 1998
- Fibulostilbum phylacicola Seifert & Bandoni 1992
- Fibulostilbum phylaciicola Seifert & Bandoni 1992
- Filobasidium elegans Bandoni & Oberw. 1991
- Filobasidium globisporum Bandoni & Oberw. 1991
- Galzinia culmigena (R.K. Webster & D.A. Reid) B.N. Johri & Bandoni 1975
- Helicobasidium corticioides Bandoni 1955
- Herpobasidium australe Oberw. & Bandoni 1984
- Ingoldiella nutans Bandoni & Marvanová 1989
- Insolibasidium Oberw. & Bandoni 1984
- Insolibasidium deformans (C.J. Gould) Oberw. & Bandoni 1984
- Mycogloea amethystina Bandoni 1998
- Mycogloea bullatospora Bandoni 1998
- Mycogloea nipponica Bandoni 1998
- Myxarium allantosporum K. Wells & Bandoni 2004
- Naiadella Marvanová & Bandoni 1987
- Naiadella fluitans Marvanová & Bandoni 1987
- Platygloea abdita Bandoni 1959
- Platygloea jacksonii Bandoni & J.C. Krug 2000
- Pleotrachelus itersoniliae (D.J.S. Barr & Bandoni) M.W. Dick 2001
- Pseudozyma Bandoni emend. Boekhout 1985
- Pseudozyma prolifica Bandoni 1985
- Ptechetelium Oberw. & Bandoni 1984
- Ptechetelium cyatheae (Syd.) Oberw. & Bandoni 1984
- Rozella itersoniliae D.J.S. Barr & Bandoni 1980
- Sigmogloea Bandoni & J.C. Krug 2000
- Sigmogloea tremelloidea Bandoni & J.C. Krug 2000
- Sirotrema Bandoni 1986
- Sirotrema parvula Bandoni 1986
- Sirotrema pusilla Bandoni 1986
- Sirotrema translucens (H.D. Gordon) Bandoni 1986
- Sporobolomyces lactophilus Nakase, Itoh, M. Suzuki & Bandoni 1990
- Sporobolomyces salicinus (B.N. Johri & Bandoni) Nakase & Itoh 1988
- Stilbotulasnella Oberw. & Bandoni 1982
- Stilbotulasnella conidiophora Bandoni & Oberw. 1982
- Tetragoniomyces Oberw. & Bandoni 1981
- Tetragoniomyces uliginosus (P. Karst.) Oberw. & Bandoni 1981
- Tetragoniomycetaceae Oberw. & Bandoni 1981
- Tilletiaria Bandoni & B.N. Johri 1972
- Tilletiaria anomala Bandoni & B.N. Johri 1972
- Tremella armeniaca Bandoni & J. Carranza 1997
- Tremella aurantialba Bandoni & M. Zang 1990
- Tremella guttiformis (Berk. & Broome) Bandoni 1961
- Tremella lilacea Bandoni & J. Carranza 1997
- Tremella mesenterella Bandoni & Ginns 1999
- Tremella nigrifacta Bandoni & J. Carranza 1997
- Tremella phaeographidis Diederich, Coppins & Bandoni 1996
- Tremella roseolutescens Bandoni & J. Carranza 1997
- Tremella subencephala Bandoni & Ginns 1993
- Tremellina Bandoni 1986
- Tremellina pyrenophila Bandoni 1986
- Trimorphomyces Bandoni & Oberw. 1983
- Trimorphomyces papilionaceus Oberw. & Bandoni 1983

== Honors and memberships ==
- Gertrude S. Burlingham Fellowship
- George Lawson Medal
- Mycological Society of Japan
- Mycological Society of America

== Eponymous taxa ==
- Bandonia
- Bandoniozyma

== See also ==
- List of mycologists
