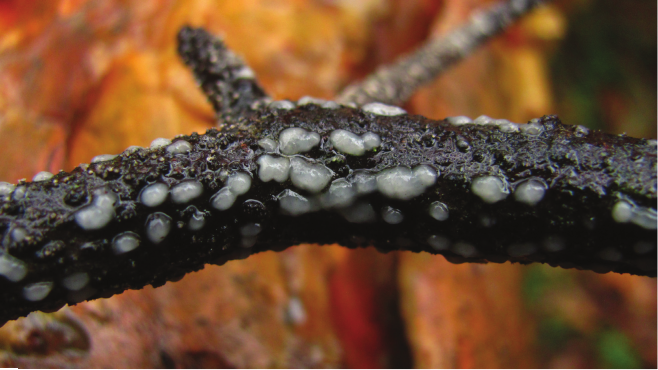

Scientific classification
- Kingdom: Fungi
- Division: Basidiomycota
- Class: Cystobasidiomycetes
- Order: Naohideales; R. Bauer, Begerow, J.P. Samp., M. Weiss & Oberw.
- Family: Naohideaceae; Denchev
- Genus: Naohidea; Oberw.
- Species: N. sebacea

Binomial name
- Naohidea sebacea (Berk. & Broome) Oberw. (1990)

Synonyms
- Dacrymyces sebaceus Berk. & Broome (1871); Platygloea sebacea (Berk. & Broome) McNabb (1965); Achroomyces sebaceus (Berk. & Broome) Wojewoda (1977); Platygloea miedzyrzecensis Bres. (1903)

= Naohidea =

Species of fungus

Naohidea sebacea is a species of fungus in the order Naohideales. The order is currently monotypic, having only one family, one genus, and one species. Basidiocarps (fruit bodies) of Naohidea sebacea form small, gelatinous pustules on wood-inhabiting species of Botryosphaeriaceae. Microscopically, they produce long, slender, auricularioid basidia (with lateral septa) and amygdaliform (almond-shaped) basidiospores.

== Taxonomy ==
The species was first described in 1871 as Dacrymyces sebaceus by the Rev. Miles Joseph Berkeley and Christopher Edmund Broome, based on specimens collected by Broome in Somerset, England. Fruit bodies have a superficial resemblance to Dacrymyces species and the name was largely forgotten until New Zealand mycologist Ross McNabb re-examined Broome's specimens in 1965, discovered they represented a fungus with auricularioid basidia, and referred the species to the genus Platygloea sensu lato. German mycologist Franz Oberwinkler investigated the species in 1990 and separated it from Platygloea sensu stricto, placing it in the new genus Naohidea. The genus name was selected in honour of Japanese mycologist Naohide Hiratsuka.

Molecular research, based on cladistic analysis of DNA sequences, has confirmed the placement of the species in Naohidea and further shown that it is (currently) an isolated species within the Pucciniomycotina with no close relatives.

== Distribution and habitat ==
Naohidea sebacea is infrequently collected, but is known to occur throughout Europe and has also been reported from North America, Japan, and Taiwan. Fruit bodies are always found overgrowing sporocarps of ascomycetous fungi in the family Botryosphaeriaceae which the species parasitizes through the formation of intracellular haustoria.
