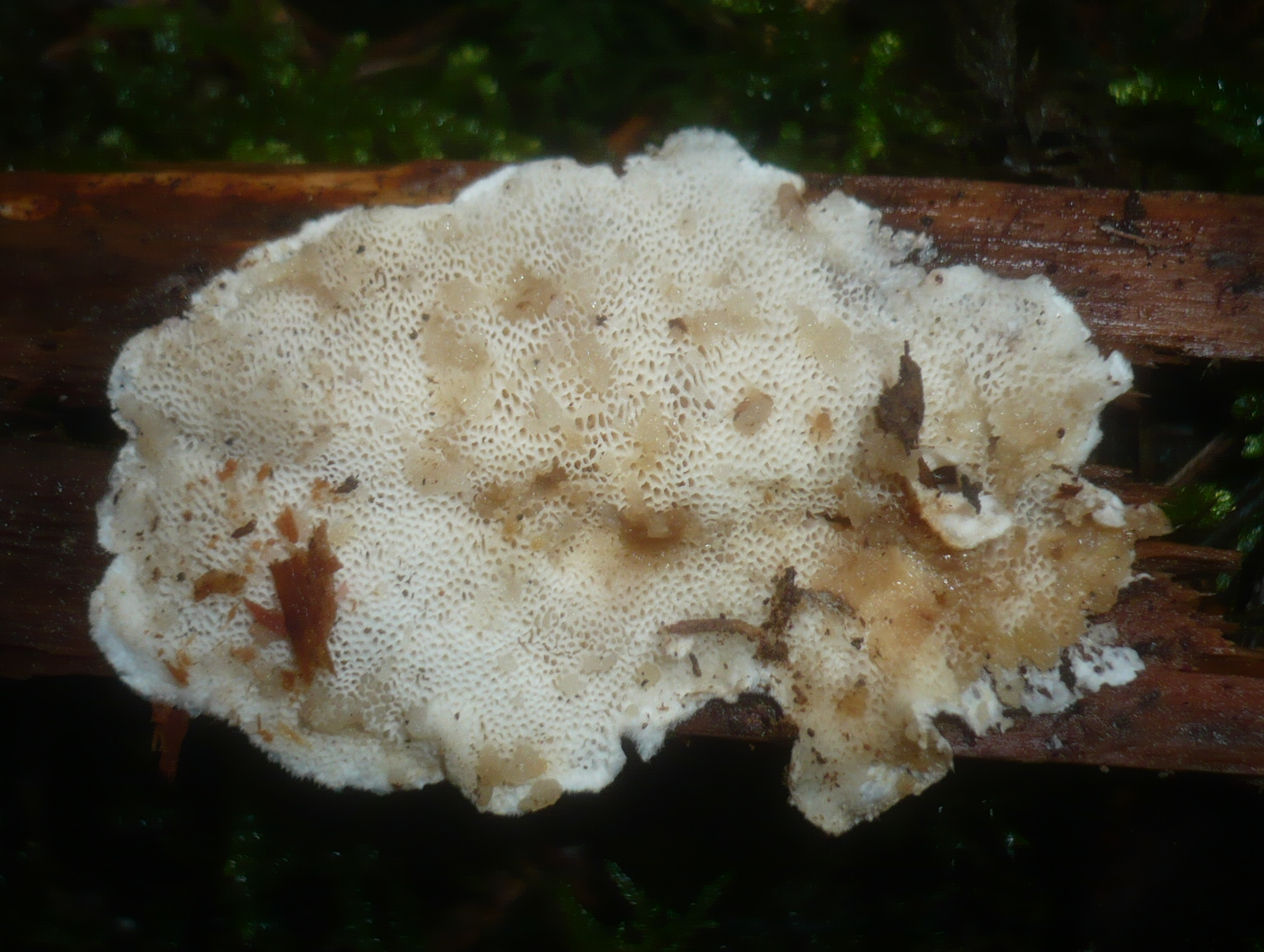
- Carcinomyces polyporinus parasitizing a polypore fungus

Scientific classification
- Kingdom: Fungi
- Division: Basidiomycota
- Class: Tremellomycetes
- Order: Tremellales
- Family: Carcinomycetaceae; Oberw. & Bandoni (1982)

Genera
- Carcinomyces

= Carcinomycetaceae =

Genus of fungi

The Carcinomycetaceae are a family of fungi in the order Tremellales. The family currently contains a single genus. Some species produce filamentous sexual states with basidia and are parasites of other fungi. Some, however, are only known from their yeast states.
