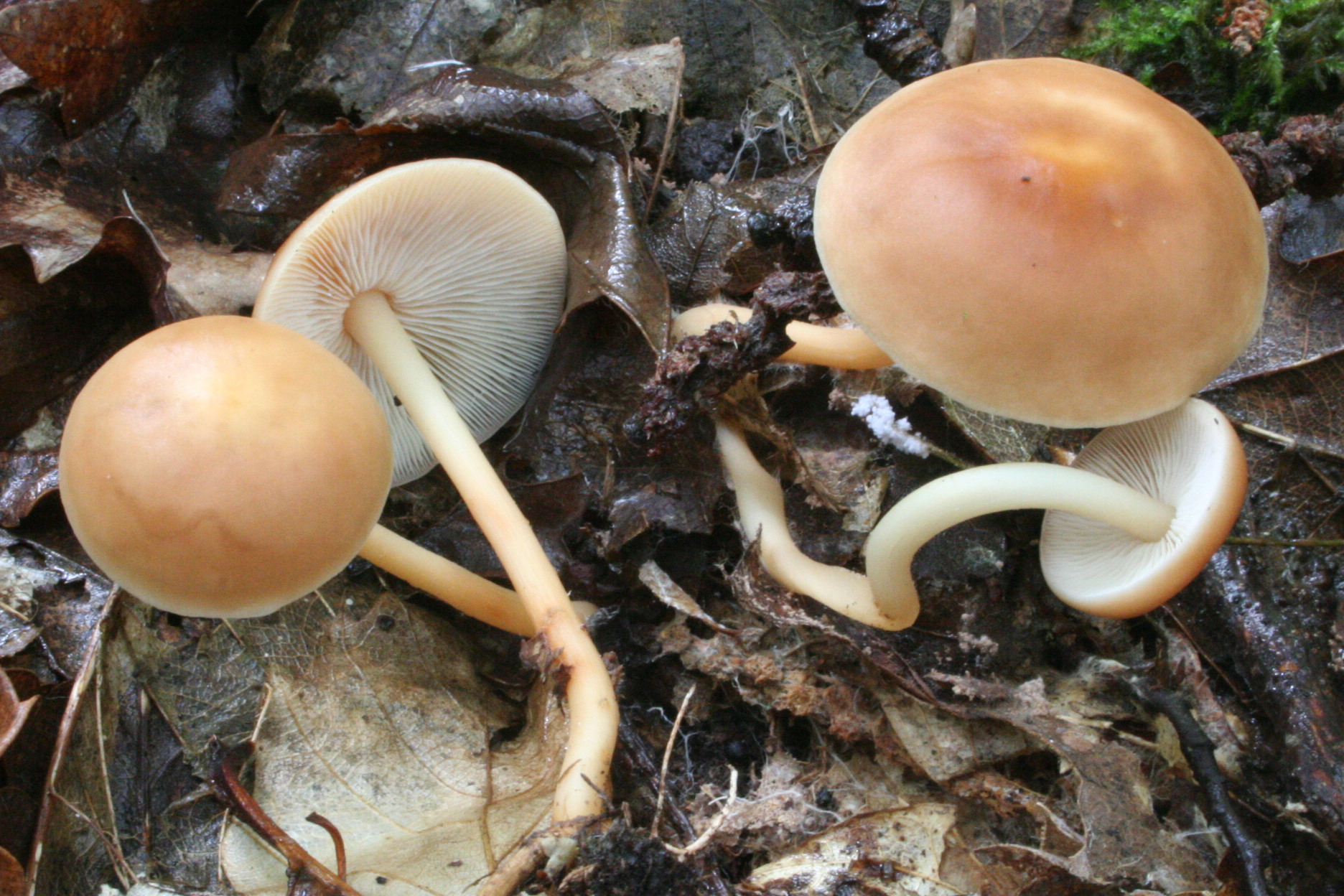

Conservation status
- Secure (NatureServe)

Scientific classification
- Kingdom: Fungi
- Division: Basidiomycota
- Class: Agaricomycetes
- Order: Agaricales
- Family: Omphalotaceae
- Genus: Gymnopus
- Species: G. dryophilus

Binomial name
- Gymnopus dryophilus (Bull.) Murrill (1916)

Synonyms
- Agaricus dryophilus Collybia aquosa var. dryophila Collybia dryophila Collybia dryophila var. alvearis Collybia dryophila var. aurata Marasmius dryophilus Marasmius dryophilus var. alvearis Marasmius dryophilus var. auratus Omphalia dryophilus

= Gymnopus dryophilus =

Gymnopus dryophilus
- Mycological characteristics
- Gills on hymenium
- Cap is convex
- Hymenium is adnexed or free
- Stipe is bare
- Spore print is white to cream
- Ecology is saprotrophic
- Edibility is not recommended or unknown

Gymnopus dryophilus is a species of mushroom, until recently most frequently known as Collybia dryophila. It belongs to section Levipedes of the genus, being characterized by a smooth stem having no hairs at the base (in contrast to section Vestipedes).

The species is commonly found in temperate woodlands of Europe and North America. It is generally saprophytic, but occasionally also attacks living wood. The caps have been considered edible but can cause severe gastrointestinal issues.

== Description ==
The cap is 2–6 centimetres (3/4–2 3/8 in) in diameter, convex, and reddish-brown to ochre (fading to tan with dryness); they become more irregular in shape with age. The gills, which are only thinly attached to the stem (detaching with age), are whitish and crowded. The spore powder is white; the buff spores do not react in Melzer's reagent. The bald stem ranges from 2–8 cm (3/4–3 1/8 in) long by 3–6 mm 3–6 mm (1/8–1/4 in) in diameter, sometimes thicker at the base. The taste is palatable.

Microscopically the spores are 6×3 μm in size and slightly tear-shaped, there are lobed club-shaped cystidia (15–50 μm × 2–6 μm), and the hyphae on the cap cuticle can also have lobes. It is contended that G. dryophilus in fact consists of a complex of different species and that several new species (including G. brunneolus, G. earleae and G. subsulphureus) should be split off from it. However these species are not generally recognized at present.

The species may carry the parasite Syzygospora mycetophila, which causes pale growths on the mushroom surface.

=== Similar species ===
Outside of its genus, it may resemble Marasmius strictipes. Additionally, Rhodocollybia butyracea has a pinkish spore deposit, and some of the spores turn reddish-brown in Melzer's reagent.

== Distribution and ecology ==
This fungus is very common in Northern Hemisphere temperate woodlands (so much so that it is sometimes considered a "weed" mushroom). It fruits from April to December and is often seen when there are few other fungi in evidence. Although the Greek epithet dryophilus means "lover of oak trees", it is also found with other broad-leaved trees and with conifers.

Grows in arcs and fairy rings in oak and pine woods, or as clusters on wood chip mulch from May to October.

Adults of the pleasing fungus beetle Tritoma humeralis have been recorded from this mushroom, but it does not seem to be a regular food source for them.

== Edibility ==
The species contains toxins which may cause severe gastrointestinal issues. However, it has been listed as edible by some sources, though not worthwhile. It is recommended not to eat the stem, which is tough.

It has been found to contain anti-inflammatory beta-glucans.

The mushroom has a sweet nutty flavor and should not be eaten in contaminated places like industrial or near roads due to its capacity to take up mercury. It is edible but may cause gastrointestinal issues in some people.
