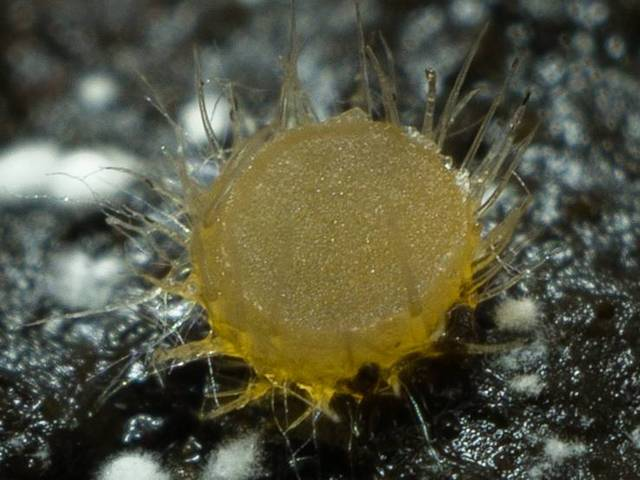
- Lasiobolus papillatus

Scientific classification
- Kingdom: Fungi
- Division: Ascomycota
- Class: Pezizomycetes
- Order: Pezizales
- Family: Ascodesmidaceae
- Genus: Lasiobolus; Sacc. (1884)

Type species
- Lasiobolus pilosus (Fr.) Sacc. (1884)

Synonyms
- Peziza subgen. Pyronemella Vido (1879); Pyronemella (Vido) Sacc. (1889)

= Lasiobolus =

Genus of fungi

Lasiobolus is a genus of fungi in the family Ascodesmidaceae.

== Species ==
- Lasiobolus aurantiacus
- Lasiobolus brachytrichus
- Lasiobolus cainii
- Lasiobolus capreoli
- Lasiobolus cuniculi
- Lasiobolus diversisporus
- Lasiobolus dubius
- Lasiobolus intermedius
- Lasiobolus lasioboloides
- Lasiobolus leporinus
- Lasiobolus longisetosus
- Lasiobolus macrotrichus
- Lasiobolus microsporus
- Lasiobolus minimus
- Lasiobolus monascus
- Lasiobolus oligotrichus
- Lasiobolus papillatus
- Lasiobolus ruber
- Lasiobolus setosus
- Lasiobolus trichoboloides
- Lasiobolus vaccinus
