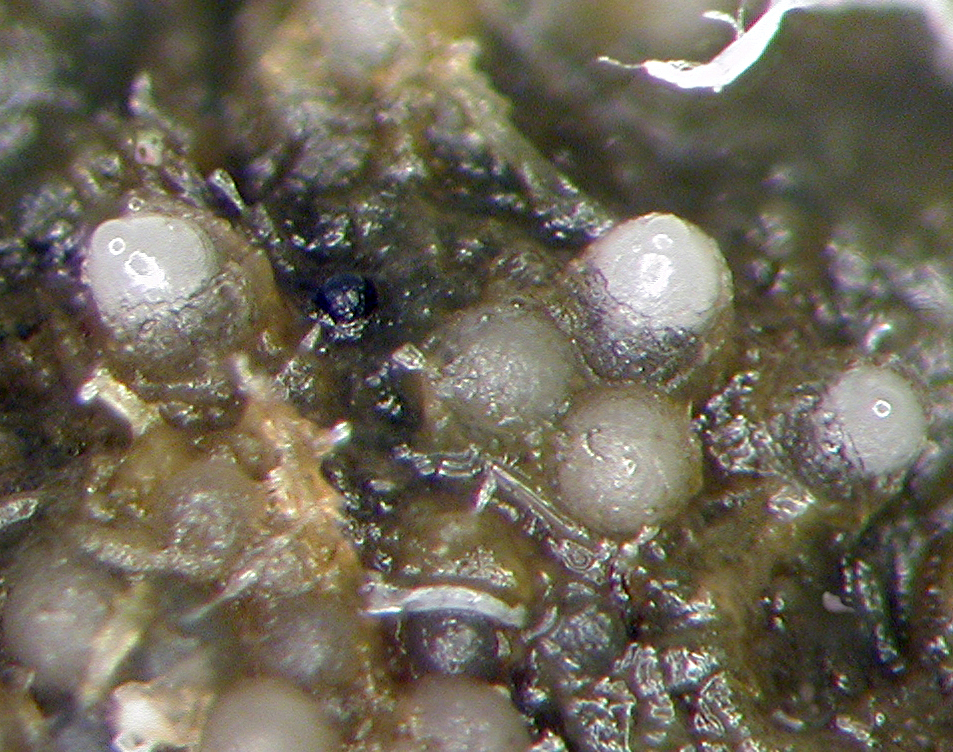

Scientific classification
- Kingdom: Fungi
- Division: Ascomycota
- Class: Leotiomycetes
- Order: Thelebolales
- Family: Thelebolaceae
- Genus: Thelebolus; Tode

Type species
- Thelebolus stercoreus Tode

= Thelebolus =

Genus of fungi

Thelebolus is a genus of fungi in the Thelebolaceae family. Often considered related to Pezizales, 18S phylogenies show Thelebolales are a sister group to Pseudeurotiaceae and Leotiales. ITS is an adequate DNA barcode but there are only six variable sites in Thelebolus; β-tubulin is a recommended secondary barcode.

Their ascomata are < 500 μm diam. and are usually considered apothecia. Cleistothecium-like or perithecium-like variants occur, but all have asci arranged in a hymenium. Most species have eight ellipsoidal ascospores in a club-shaped ascus, but some Thelebolus asci have hundreds of ascospores. Ascospores are forcibly ejected synchronously in a sticky mass. Agar colonies are smooth and pinkish, conidium producing collars ("phialides") arising directly on hyphae, and slimy, 1-celled, hyaline conidia that appear yeast-like. Ascoma production is favored by media such as carrot agar.

Most species grow on dung or are isolated from soil. Most are psychrophiles with optimal growth at 10–15°C and occur mostly in (sub)arctic ecosystems. They may have evolved in response to the double challenge of extreme cold while growing on dung, and the need to survive passage through the gut of warm-blooded animals.

Thelebolus stercoreus is a cosmopolitan psychrophile on dung and in soil, with pale yellow to brown cleistothecia containing asci with 32–2000 ellipsoidal ascospores. Variants with different ascospore numbers often were considered different species, but phylogenetic studies do not support this. In the Antarctic, T. stercoreus grows in microalgal mats in lakes, perhaps associated with seabird dung.
