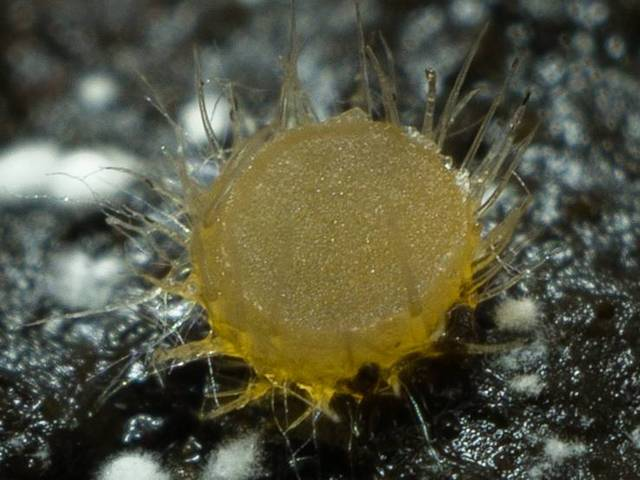
- Lasiobolus papillatus

Scientific classification
- Kingdom: Fungi
- Division: Ascomycota
- Class: Pezizomycetes
- Order: Pezizales
- Family: Ascodesmidaceae; J.Schröt. (1893)

Type genus
- Ascodesmis Tiegh. (1876)

Genera
- Ascodesmis; Eleutherascus; Lasiobolus

= Ascodesmidaceae =

Family of fungi

The Ascodesmidaceae are a family of fungi in the order Pezizales.
