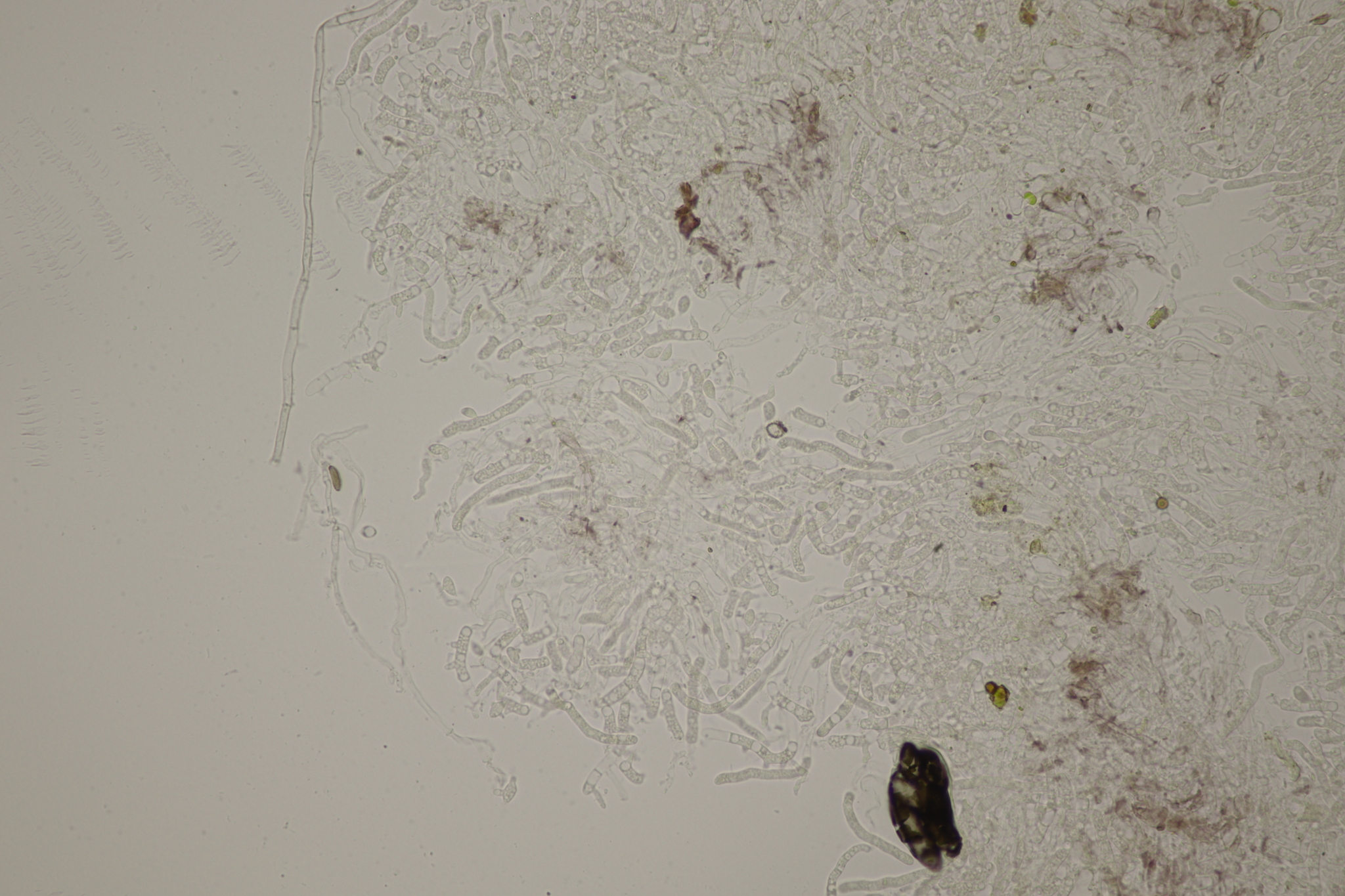

Scientific classification
- Kingdom: Fungi
- Division: Basidiomycota
- Class: Cystobasidiomycetes
- Order: Cystobasidiales; R. Bauer, Begerow, J.P. Samp., M. Weiß & Oberw. (2006)

Families
- Cystobasidiaceae

= Cystobasidiales =

Order of fungi

The Cystobasidiales are an order of fungi in the class Cystobasidiomycetes. The order currently consists of a single family (Cystobasidiaceae) and two genera as yet unassigned to a family (Begerowomyces and Robertozyma).

Many species in the Cystobasidiales are known only from their yeast states. Where known, basidiocarps (fruit bodies) have auricularioid (laterally septate) basidia and occur as parasites on or in the fruit bodies of other fungi.
