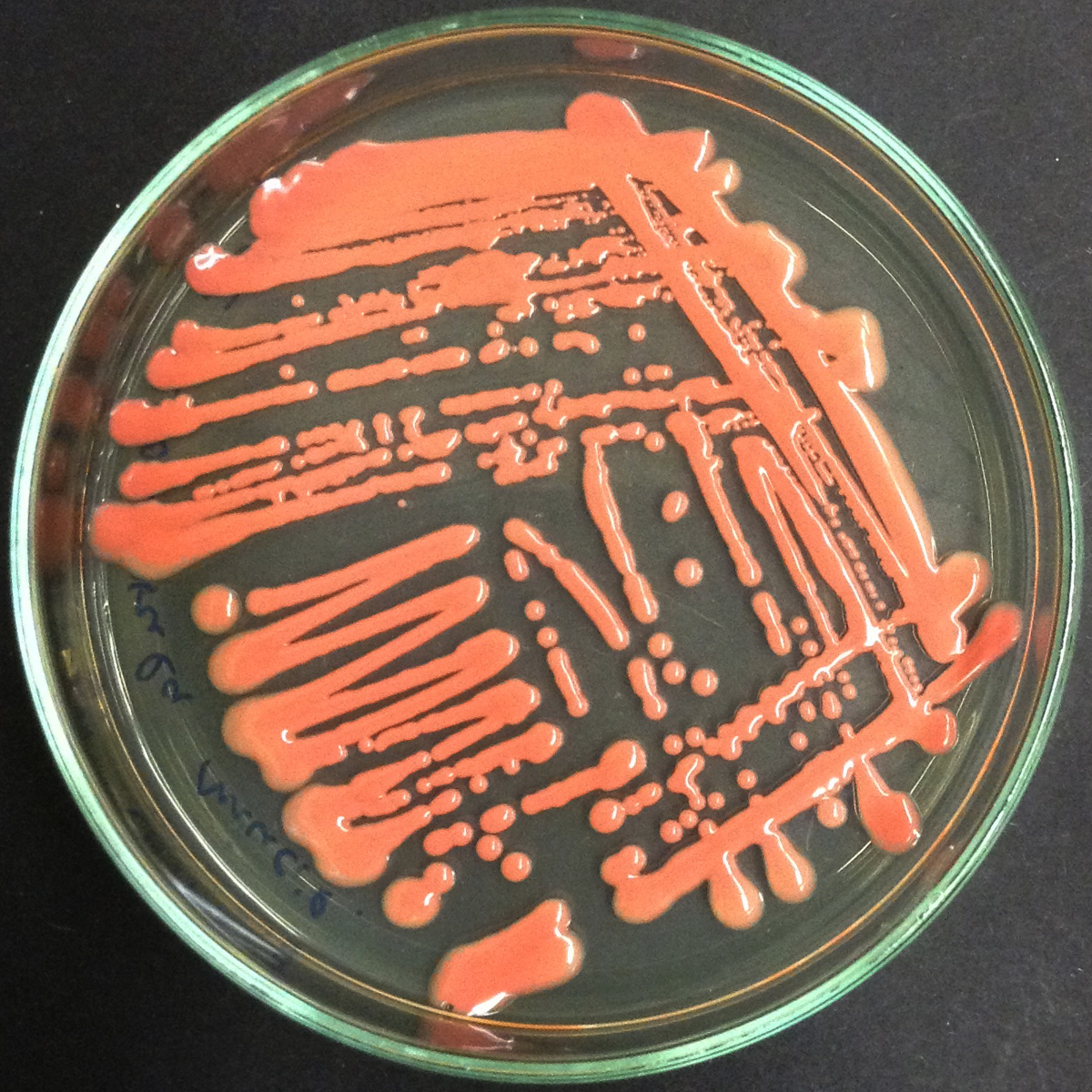
- Rhodotorula mucilaginosa colonies grown in yeast extract glucose on a Petri dish

Scientific classification
- Kingdom: Fungi
- Division: Basidiomycota
- Subdivision: Pucciniomycotina
- Class: Cystobasidiomycetes; R.Bauer, Begerow, J.P.Samp., M.Weiss & Oberw. (2006)

Orders
- Buckleyzymales; Cystobasidiales; Erythrobasidiales; Naohideales; Sakaguchiales

= Cystobasidiomycetes =

Class of fungi

The Cystobasidiomycetes are a class of fungi in the subdivision Pucciniomycotina of the Basidiomycota. Most species are known from their yeast states; hyphal states, when present, produce auricularioid (laterally septate) basidia and are frequently (possibly always) parasites of other fungi. The class contains five orders (Buckleyzymales, Cystobasidiales, Erythrobasidiales, Naohideales, and Sakaguchiales) as well as two families (Microsporomycetaceae and Symmetrosporaceae) and one genus (Queiroziella) of uncertain disposition. An additional order, Cyphobasidiales, has been proposed to accommodate several lichenicolous species, but its separation from the Erythrobasidiales has not been demonstrated.
