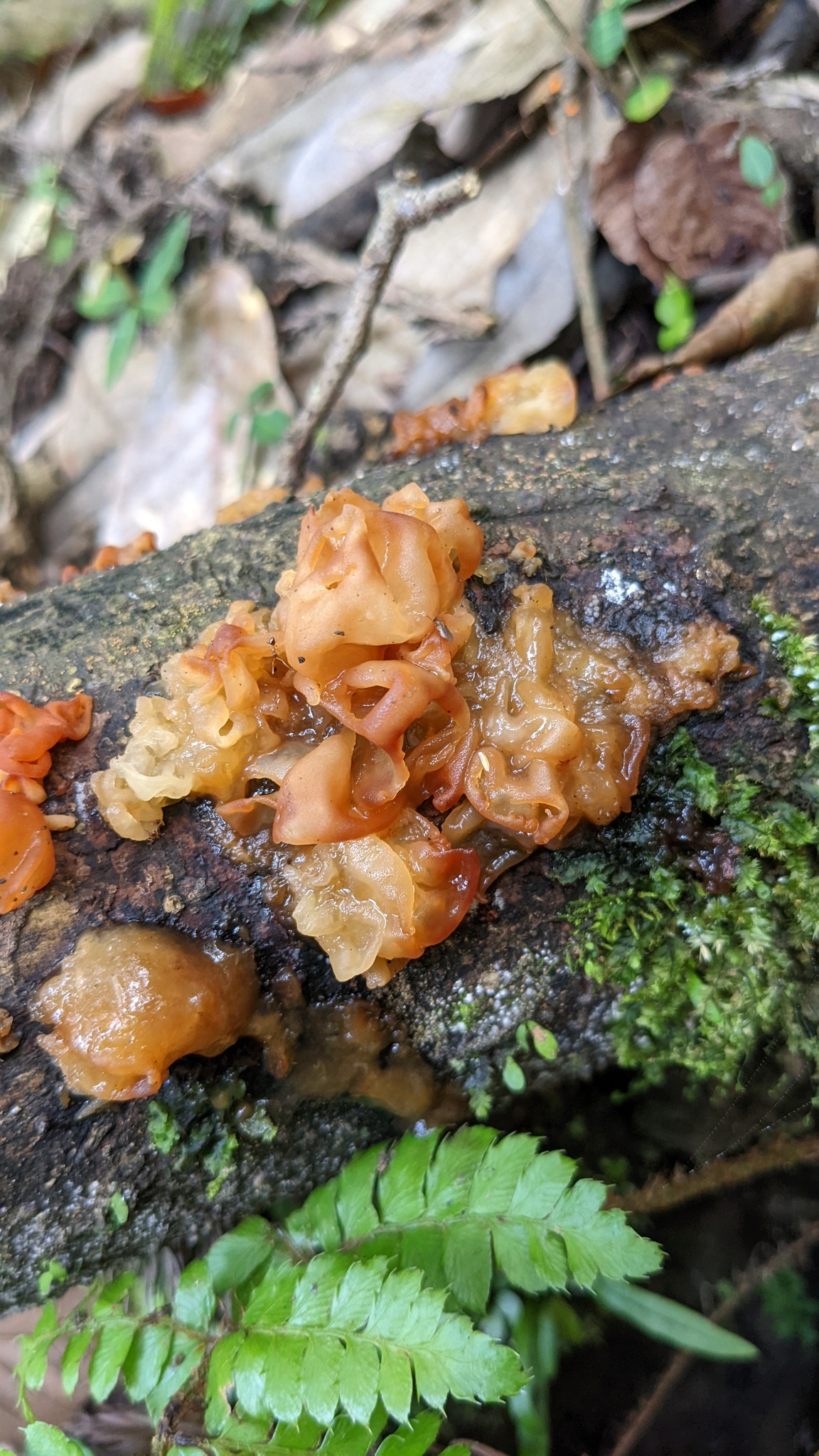
- Sirobasidium magnum

Scientific classification
- Domain: Eukaryota
- Kingdom: Fungi
- Division: Basidiomycota
- Class: Tremellomycetes
- Order: Tremellales
- Family: Sirobasidiaceae
- Genus: Sirobasidium; Lagerh. & Pat. (1892)

Type species
- Sirobasidium sanguineum Lagerh. & Pat. (1892)

Species
- Sirobasidium albidum Sirobasidium apiculatum Sirobasidium brefeldianum Sirobasidium japonicum Sirobasidium magnum Sirobasidium minutum Sirobasidium rubrofuscum Sirobasidium sandwicense Sirobasidium sanguineum

= Sirobasidium =

Genus of fungi

Sirobasidium is a genus of fungi in the order Tremellales. Basidiocarps (fruit bodies) are gelatinous and appear to be parasitic on ascomycetous fungi on wood. Microscopically they are distinguished by producing septate basidia in chains which give rise to deciduous sterigmata. Species are distributed worldwide.

== Taxonomy ==
Sirobasidium was introduced in 1892 by Swedish mycologist Gustaf Lagerheim and French mycologist Narcisse Patouillard for two fungi collected in Ecuador that possessed distinctive, catenulate, tremelloid basidia (septate basidia formed in chains). Subsequent authors added further species with similar basidia.

Molecular research, based on cladistic analysis of DNA sequences, has shown that Sirobasidium may be polyphyletic (and hence artificial), though this is based on a single culture that may be contaminated and requires further research.

== Description ==
Fruit bodies are gelatinous and are variously pustular to foliose (with leaf-like or seaweed-like fronds). Colours are typically reddish, yellow, or brown.

=== Microscopic characters ===
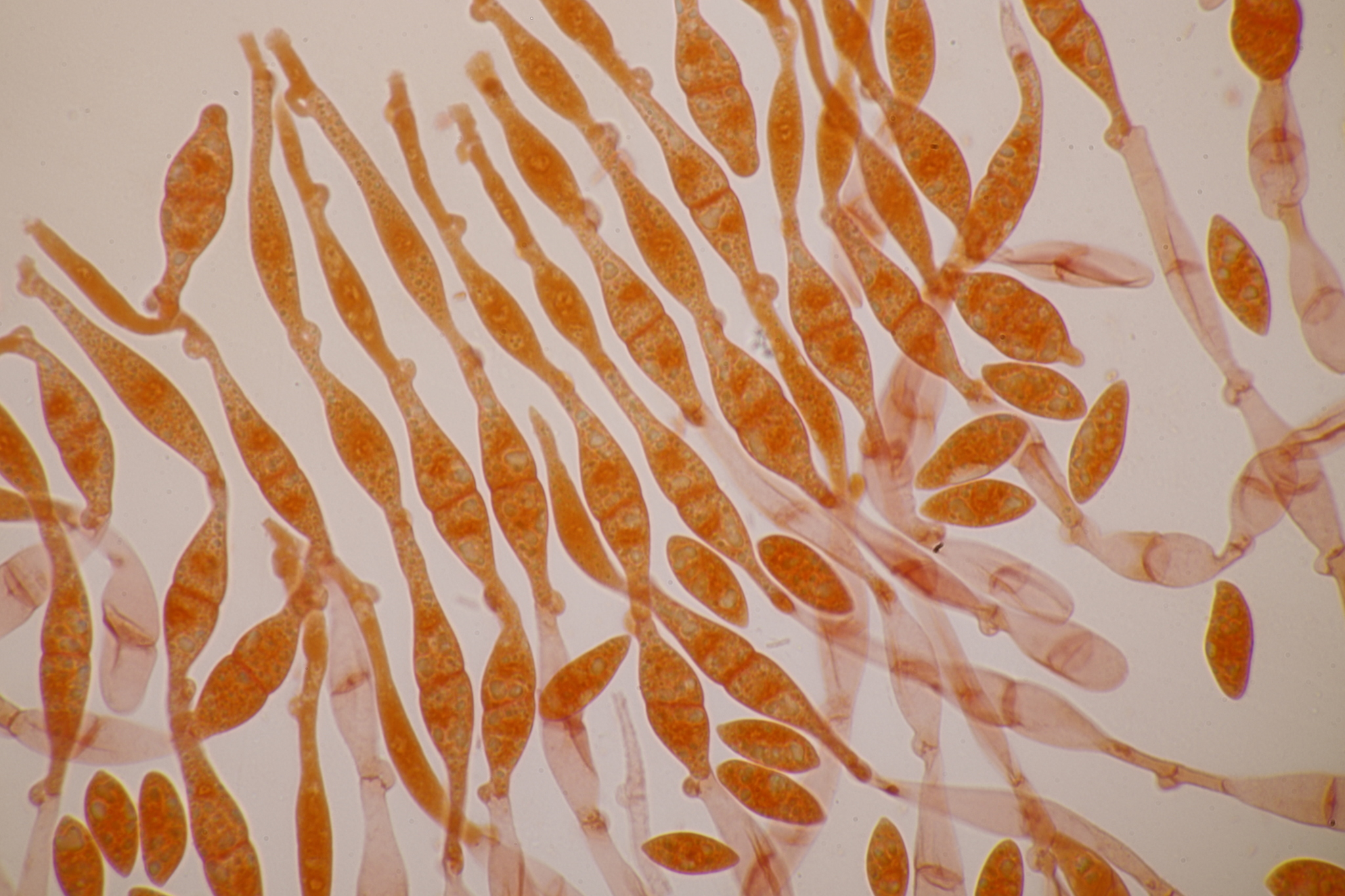
Catenulate, septate basidia of Sirobasidium brefeldianum

The basidia are "tremelloid" (globose to ellipsoid or fusiform and vertically or diagonally septate) and catenulate (formed in chains), giving rise to fusiform sterigmata or epibasidia which detach from the basidia and then produce basidiospores. These spores are smooth, globose, and germinate by hyphal tube or yeast cells.

== Habitat and distribution ==
Sirobasidium species are associated with and possibly parasitic on fungi in the Diatrypaceae growing on dead attached or fallen wood, including species of Eutypa, Eutypella, and Diatrype. As a group, Sirobasidium species occur worldwide, though individual species may have a more restricted distribution.
