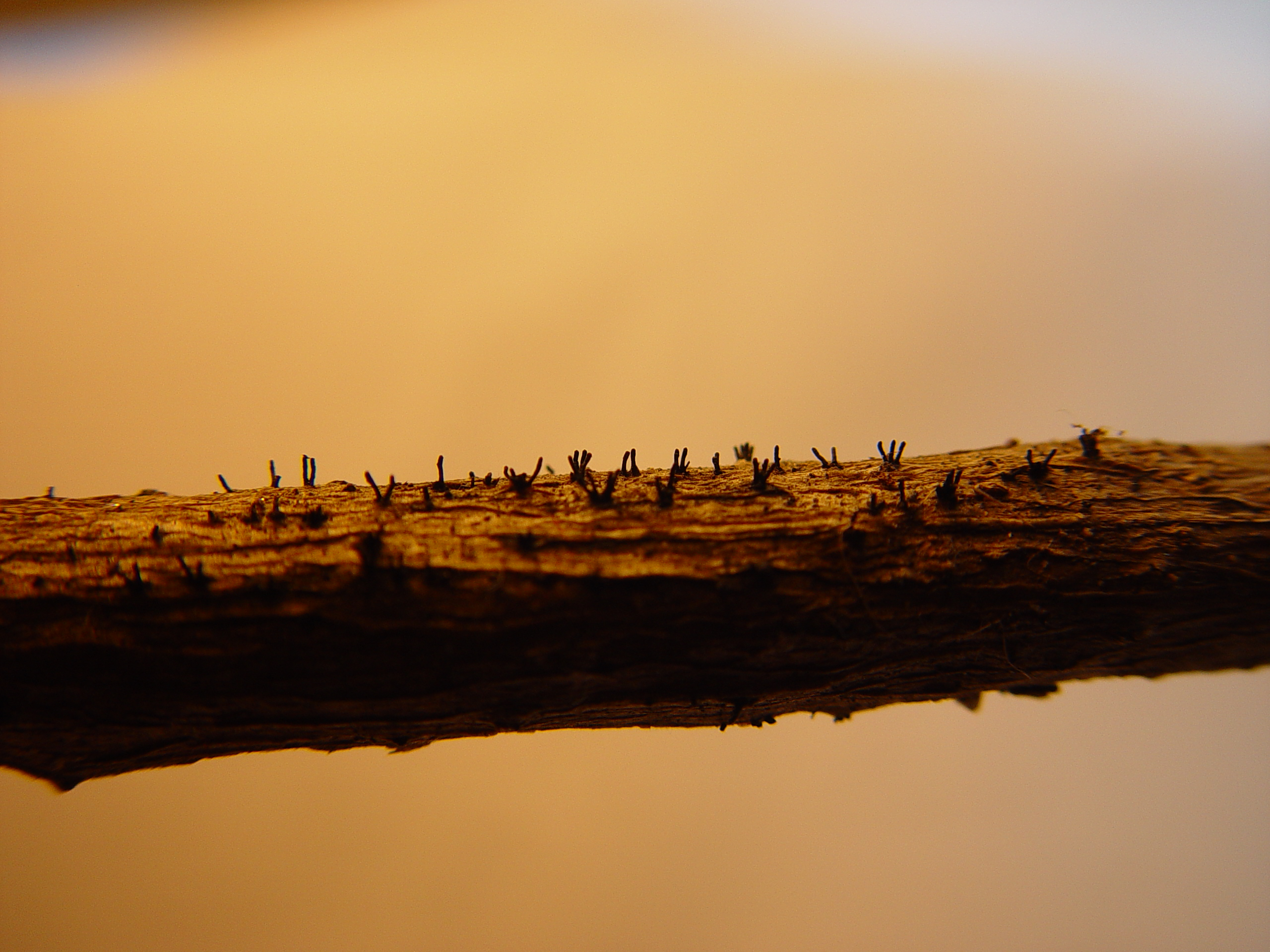

Scientific classification
- Kingdom: Fungi
- Division: Ascomycota
- Class: Sordariomycetes
- Order: Xylariales
- Family: Diatrypaceae
- Genus: Peroneutypa
- Species: P. scoparia

Binomial name
- Peroneutypa scoparia (Schwein.) Carmarán & A.I. Romero

= Peroneutypa scoparia =

Species of fungus

Peroneutypa scoparia is a carbonaceous pyrenomycete small in size, rarely reaching a centimeter in height. It grows on dead wood, and grows in thin, upright projections. With the help of magnification, a grooving pattern on the tips similar to a philips-head screwdriver can be seen.
