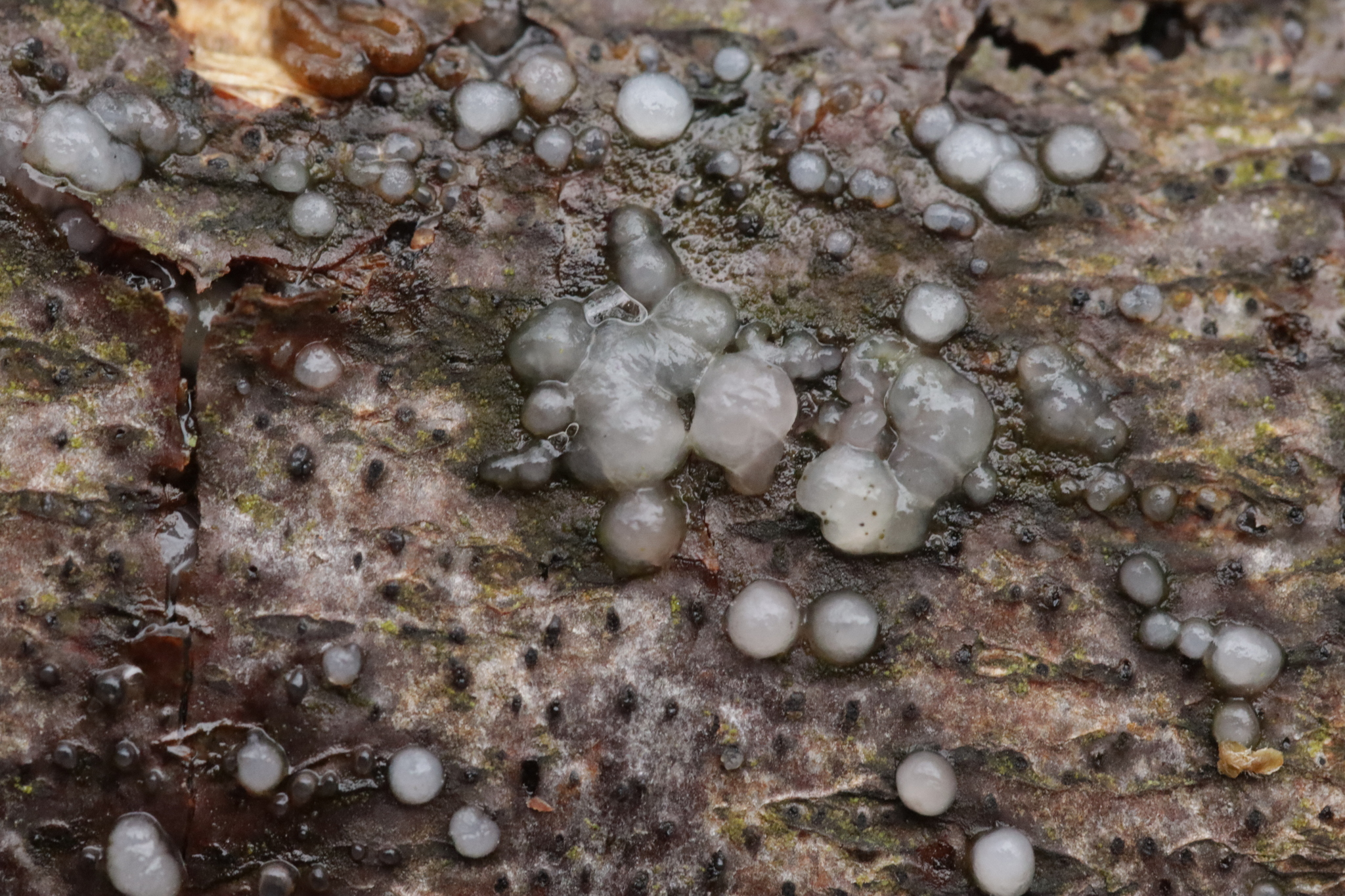

Scientific classification
- Domain: Eukaryota
- Kingdom: Fungi
- Division: Basidiomycota
- Class: Tremellomycetes
- Order: Tremellales
- Family: Sirobasidiaceae
- Genus: Sirobasidium
- Species: S. brefeldianum

Binomial name
- Sirobasidium brefeldianum Möller (1895)

= Sirobasidium brefeldianum =

Species of fungus

Sirobasidium brefeldianum is a species of fungus in the order Tremellales. Basidiocarps (fruit bodies) are gelatinous and appear to be parasitic on ascomycetous fungi on wood. The species was originally described from Brazil, but has also been reported from Asia and Europe.

== Taxonomy ==
Sirobasidium brefeldianum was described from Brazil in 1895 by German mycologist Alfred Möller. Molecular research, based on cladistic analysis of DNA sequences, has indicated that Sirobasidium brefeldianum may not be closely related to other Sirobasidium species, though this is based on a single culture from Europe that may be contaminated and requires further research.

== Description ==
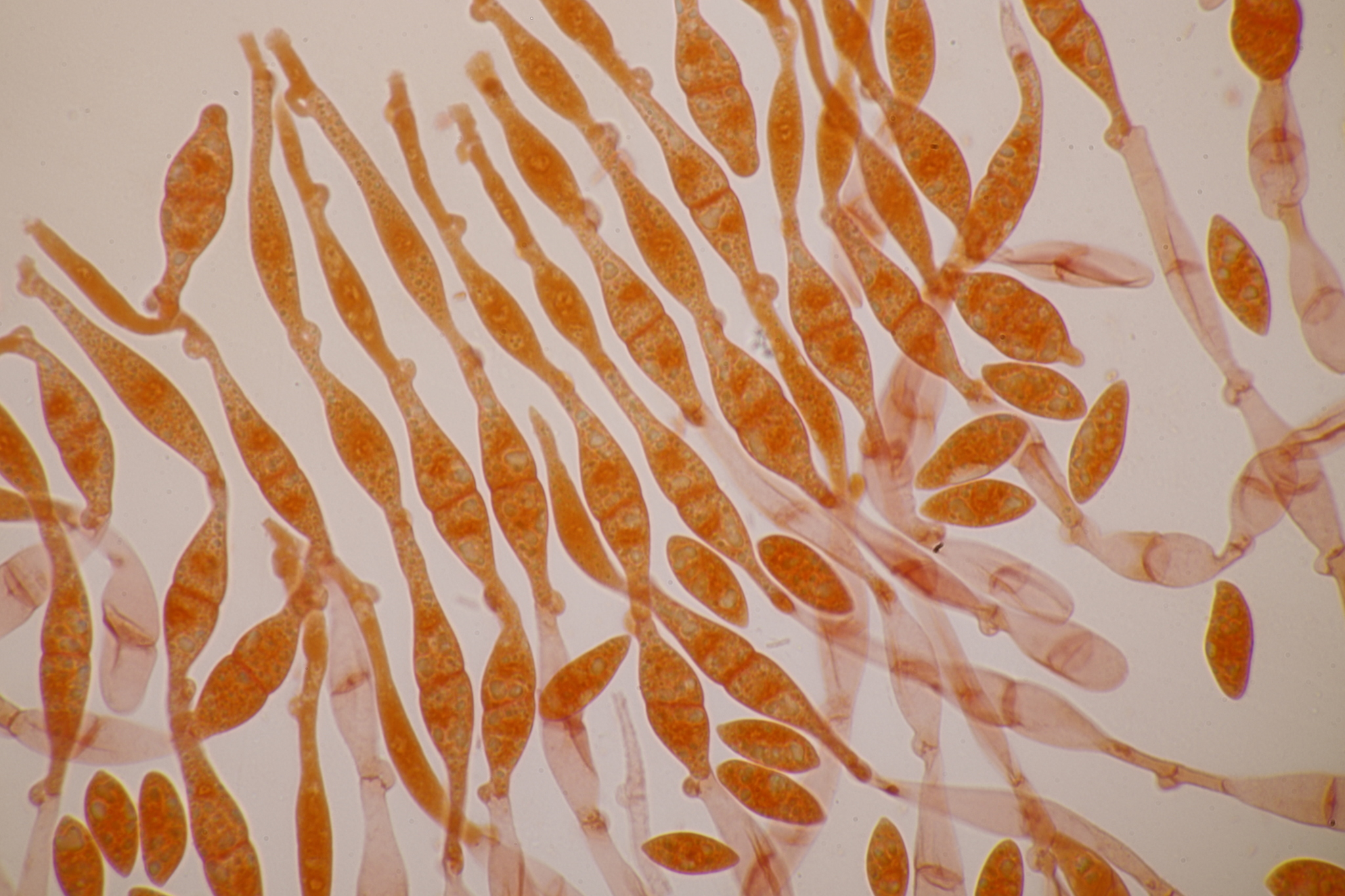
Catenulate, septate basidia of Sirobasidium brefeldianum

Fruit bodies are gelatinous, pustular, and whitish, typically occurring in groups. Each measures up to 3 mm across. Basidia are catenulate (formed in chains), with up to 12 basidia in each chain. Individual basidia are ellipsoid to fusiform and transversely biseptate. The sterigmata are deciduous, fusiform, 22-24 x 7-8 μm. The basidiospores are globose, 6-8 μm across.

== Habitat and distribution ==
Sirobasidium brefeldianum was originally described on rotten wood, but European collections are associated with and possibly parasitic on fungi in the Diatrypaceae, including species of Eutypella, growing on dead attached or fallen wood. Sirobasidium brefeldianum has been reported not only from South America, but also Europe (Belgium, England, France, Germany), Asia (Brunei, Ceylon, India), and Macaronesia (Canary Islands), though it is not clear that all these reports refer to the same species.
