= Eutypa lata =

Scientific classification
- Kingdom: Fungi
- Division: Ascomycota
- Class: Sordariomycetes
- Order: Xylariales
- Family: Diatrypaceae
- Genus: Eutypa
- Species: E. lata

Binomial name
- Eutypa lata (Pers.) Tul and C. Tul.

Synonyms
- synonyms (in date order): Sphaeria papillata Hoffm., Veg. Crypt. 1: 19 (1787); Sphaeria lata Pers., Observ. mycol. (Lipsiae) 1: 66 (1796); Sphaeria fuliginosa Sowerby, Col. fig. Engl. Fung. Mushr. (London) 3(no. 25): tab. 373, fig. 9 (1802); Sphaeria milliaria Fr., K. svenska Vetensk-Akad. Handl., ser. 3 38: 82 (1817); Nemania lata (Pers.) Gray, Nat. Arr. Brit. Pl. (London) 1: 517 (1821); Stromatosphaeria lata (Pers.) Grev., Fl. Edin.: 357 (1824); Hypoxylon latum (Pers.) Westend., Ann. soc. sci. méd. nat. Brux.: 71 (1839); Sphaeria lata var. arundinis Durieu & Mont., in Durieu, Expl. Sci. Alg., Fl. Algér. 1(livr. 12): 461 (1848); Diatrype lata (Pers.) Fr., Summa veg. Scand., Sectio Post. (Stockholm): 385 (1849); Diatrype milliaria (Fr.) Fr., Summa veg. Scand., Sectio Post. (Stockholm): 385 (1849); Valsa lata (Pers.) Nitschke, Pyrenomyc. Germ. 1: 141 (1867); Valsa mauroides Nitschke, Pyrenomyc. Germ. 1: 151 (1867); Valsa milliaria (Fr.) Nitschke, Pyrenomyc. Germ. 1: 149 (1867); Valsa fraxini Nitschke, Pyrenomyc. Germ. 1: 145 (1867); Valsa myriocarpa Nitschke, Pyrenomyc. Germ. 1: 159 (1867); Valsa rhodi Nitschke, Pyrenomyc. Germ. 1: 148 (1867); Eutypa rhodi (Nitschke) Fuckel, Jb. nassau. Ver. Naturk. 23-24: 213 (1870); Eutypa ambigua J. Kunze, Fung. sel. exs., cent. 2: no. 152 (1877); Eutypa rhodi f. corni-sanguinea Sacc., Michelia 1(no. 5): 504 (1879); Diatrype macrothecia Speg., Anal. Soc. cient. argent. 10(3): 138 (1880); Cryptosphaeria myriocarpa (Nitschke) Sacc., Syll. fung. (Abellini) 1: 183 (1882); Eutypa ambigua J. Kunze ex Sacc., Syll. fung. (Abellini) 1: 176 (1882); Eutypa fraxini (Nitschke) Sacc., Syll. fung. (Abellini) 1: 174 (1882); Eutypa fraxini f. arbuti Sacc., Syll. fung. (Abellini) 1: 175 (1882); Eutypa lata var. arundinis (Durieu & Mont.) Sacc., Syll. fung. (Abellini) 1: 170 (1882); Eutypa mauroides (Nitschke) Sacc., Syll. fung. (Abellini) 1: 173 (1882); Eutypa milliaria (Fr.) Sacc., Syll. fung. (Abellini) 1: 175 (1882); Eutypa rhodi var. corni-sanguineae Sacc., Syll. fung. (Abellini) 1: 176 (1882); Cryptosphaeria crepiniana Sacc. & Roum., Revue mycol., Toulouse 5(no. 20): 233 (1883); Cytosporina milliaria (Fr.) Sacc., Syll. fung. (Abellini) 3: 602 (1884); Cytosporina myriocarpa (Nitschke) Sacc., Syll. fung. (Abellini) 3: 602 (1884); Valsa ambigua (J. Kunze ex Sacc.) G. Winter, Rabenh. Krypt.-Fl., Edn 2 (Leipzig) 1(2): 685 (1886); Eutypa lata var. macrochloae Pat., Cat. Rais. Pl. Cellul. Tunisie (Paris): 101 (1897); Engizostoma ambiguum (J. Kunze ex Sacc.) Kuntze, Revis. gen. pl. (Leipzig) 3(3): 473 (1898); Engizostoma crepinianum (Sacc. & Roum.) Kuntze, Revis. gen. pl. (Leipzig) 3(3): 473 (1898); Engizostoma fraxini (Nitschke) Kuntze, Revis. gen. pl. (Leipzig) 3(3): 474 (1898); Engizostoma latum (Pers.) Kuntze, Revis. gen. pl. (Leipzig) 3(3): 474 (1898); Engizostoma mauroides (Nitschke) Kuntze [as 'maurodes'], Revis. gen. pl. (Leipzig) 3(3): 474 (1898); Engizostoma milliarium (Fr.) Kuntze, Revis. gen. pl. (Leipzig) 3(3): 474 (1898); Engizostoma myriocarpum (Nitschke) Kuntze, Revis. gen. pl. (Leipzig) 3(3): 474 (1898); Engizostoma rhodi (Nitschke) Kuntze, Revis. gen. pl. (Leipzig) 3(3): 475 (1898); Libertella blepharis A.L. Sm., J. Roy. Microscop. Soc.: 424 (1900); Cytosporina ribis Magnus, in van Hall, Annls mycol. 1(6): 503 (1903); Eutypa lata var. andina Speg., Anal. Mus. nac. B. Aires, Ser. 3 12: 331 (1909); Eutypa lata var. rimulosa Sacc., Annls mycol. 12(3): 288 (1914); Cytosporina lata Höhn., Mitt. bot. Inst. tech. Hochsch. Wien 4(2): 64 (1927); Eutypa lata var. ribis Barthelet, Annls Épiphyt., n.s. (Sér. Path. vég.-Mém. 1) 4: 496 (1938); Eutypa lata f. platani Maire, Act. Inst. bot. Univ. Athèn. 1: 38 (1940); Eutypa armeniacae Hansf. & M.V. Carter, Aust. J. Bot. 5(1): 21 (1957); Phomopsis ribis (Magnus) Grove ex E.K. Cash, in Trotter & Cash, Syll. fung. (Abellini) 26: 243 (1972); Eutypa lata var. aceris Rappaz, Mycol. helv. 2(3): 362 (1987)

Species of fungus

Eutypa lata is a fungal plant pathogen of grapevines. The fungus also attacks many other hosts such as cherry trees, most other Prunus species, as well as apples, pears and walnuts. In apricots, the fungus reveals a canker surrounding a pruning wound.

Eutypa lata was first found in Californian grapevines by English et al.1962, a few years after its discovery elsewhere. Travadon et al., 2011 finds that E. lata is an entirely or almost entirely sexual population here but asexual reproduction may be a rare occurrence.

It causes 'Eutypa dieback' in New Zealand grapevines as well.

The fungus was difficult to identify on the basis of colony morphology and could be out-competed by other fungi when isolated from wood. DNA isolated from one year old canes can be used instead.
