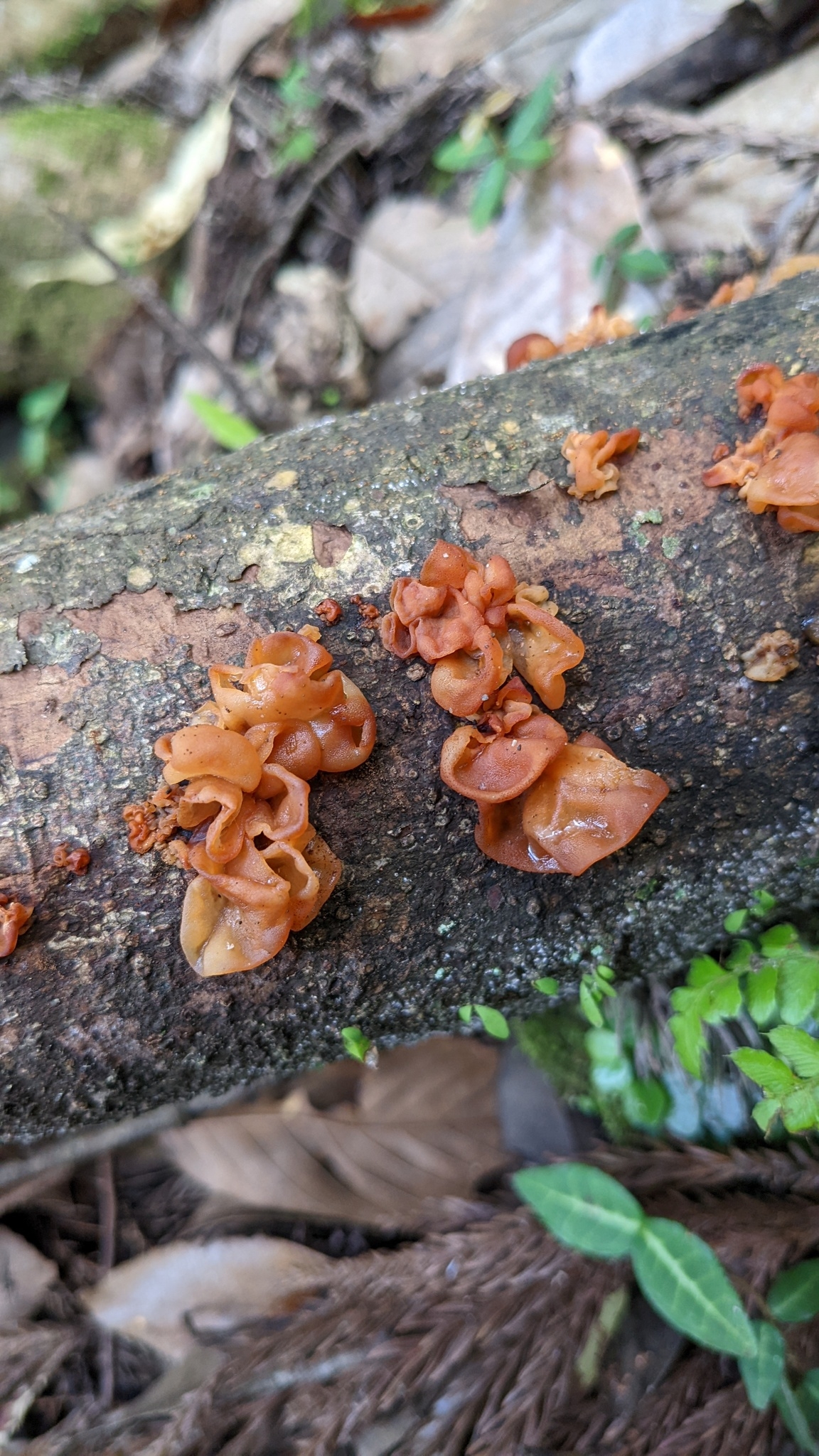

Scientific classification
- Domain: Eukaryota
- Kingdom: Fungi
- Division: Basidiomycota
- Class: Tremellomycetes
- Order: Tremellales
- Family: Sirobasidiaceae
- Genus: Sirobasidium
- Species: S. magnum

Binomial name
- Sirobasidium magnum Boedijn (1934)

= Sirobasidium magnum =

Species of fungus

Sirobasidium magnum is a species of fungus in the order Tremellales. Basidiocarps (fruit bodies) are gelatinous, lobed to foliose (leaf-like) and appear to be parasitic on ascomycetous fungi on wood. No other Sirobasidium species has such large fruit bodies. The species was originally described from Indonesia, but has been reported from elsewhere in Asia and also in Australia and North America.

== Taxonomy ==
Sirobasidium magnum was described from Borneo and Java in 1934 by Dutch mycologist Karel Boedijn.

== Description ==
Fruit bodies are gelatinous, lobed and folded, and orange-brown. measuring up to 45 mm across. Basidia are catenulate (formed in chains), with up to 8 basidia in each chain. Individual basidia are oval to fusiform and transversely 2-4-septate. The sterigmata are deciduous, fusiform, 15-19 x 4-5 μm. The basidiospores are globose, 7-9 μm across.

== Habitat and distribution ==
Sirobasidium magnum was originally described on rotten wood, but is possibly parasitic on fungi in the genus Hypoxylon growing on dead attached or fallen wood. Sirobasidium magnum has been recorded from Asia (China, Indonesia, Japan, Korea, Malaysia, Philippines, Singapore, Taiwan, Thailand), Australia, the Seychelles, Tahiti, and North America (USA).
