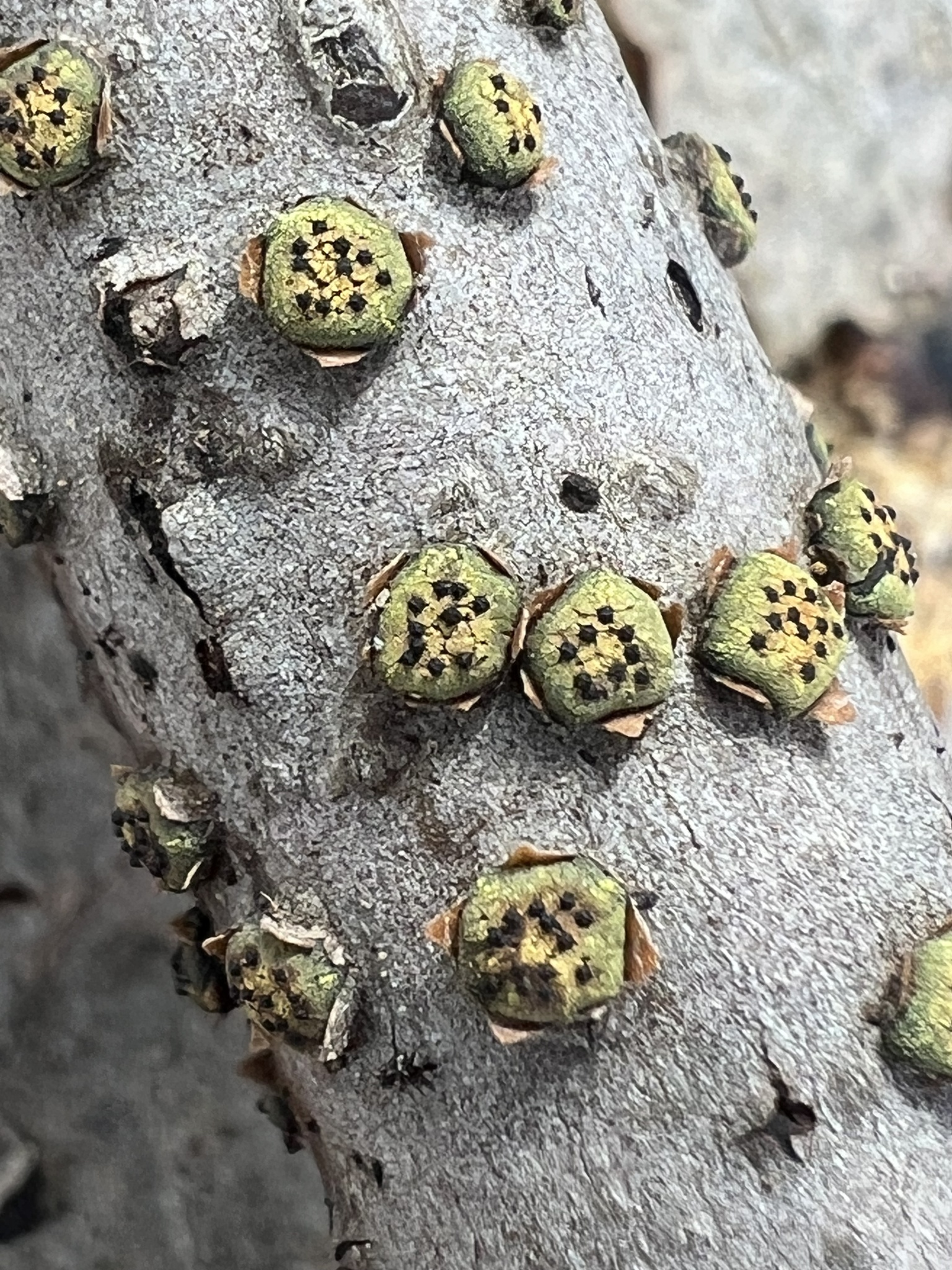

Scientific classification
- Kingdom: Fungi
- Division: Ascomycota
- Class: Sordariomycetes
- Order: Xylariales
- Family: Diatrypaceae
- Genus: Diatrype
- Species: D. virescens

Binomial name
- Diatrype virescens (Schwein.) M.A. Curtis

= Diatrype virescens =

Species of fungus

Diatrype virescens is a carbonaceous pyrenomycete in the family Diatrypaceae. It grows uniquely on the wood of American beech (Fagus grandifolia) in North America. Its growth structure is immersed, popping out from under the bark in scattered green fruiting bodies which soon fade to black.

== Description ==
Diatrype virescens grows from under the bark, pushing it aside in a conspicuous manner. The fruiting body is yellowish-green, and ranges 2.5–4 mm in diameter. The color fades into brown and black and soon can look similar to Biscogniauxia marginata. There are usually several sulcate (grooved) ostioles per fruiting body.

Microscopic features are: "Asci clavate, p. sp. 35–40 × 4–6 μm. Ascospores (10)12–14 × 2.5–3 μm."

This fungus is found in North America growing only on Fagus grandifolia.

=== Distinguishing features ===
The green circular fruiting bodies with the black grooved ostioles popping out gregariously make D. virescens an easy to identify member of Diatrype.

=== Similar species ===
Biscogniauxia marginata is the most likely to be confused with older specimens of D. virescens that have lost their green colour. B. marginata can be distinguished by its larger size (3-8mm in diameter), and its tendency to grow on trees in the family Rosaceae rather than Fagus grandifolia.
