= Echinomyces =

Scientific classification
- Domain: Eukaryota
- Kingdom: Fungi
- Division: Ascomycota
- Class: Sordariomycetes
- Order: Xylariales
- Family: Diatrypaceae
- Genus: Echinomyces; Rappaz

Type species
- Echinomyces obesa (Syd.) Rappaz

Genus of fungi

Echinomyces is a genus of fungi in the family Diatrypaceae.
