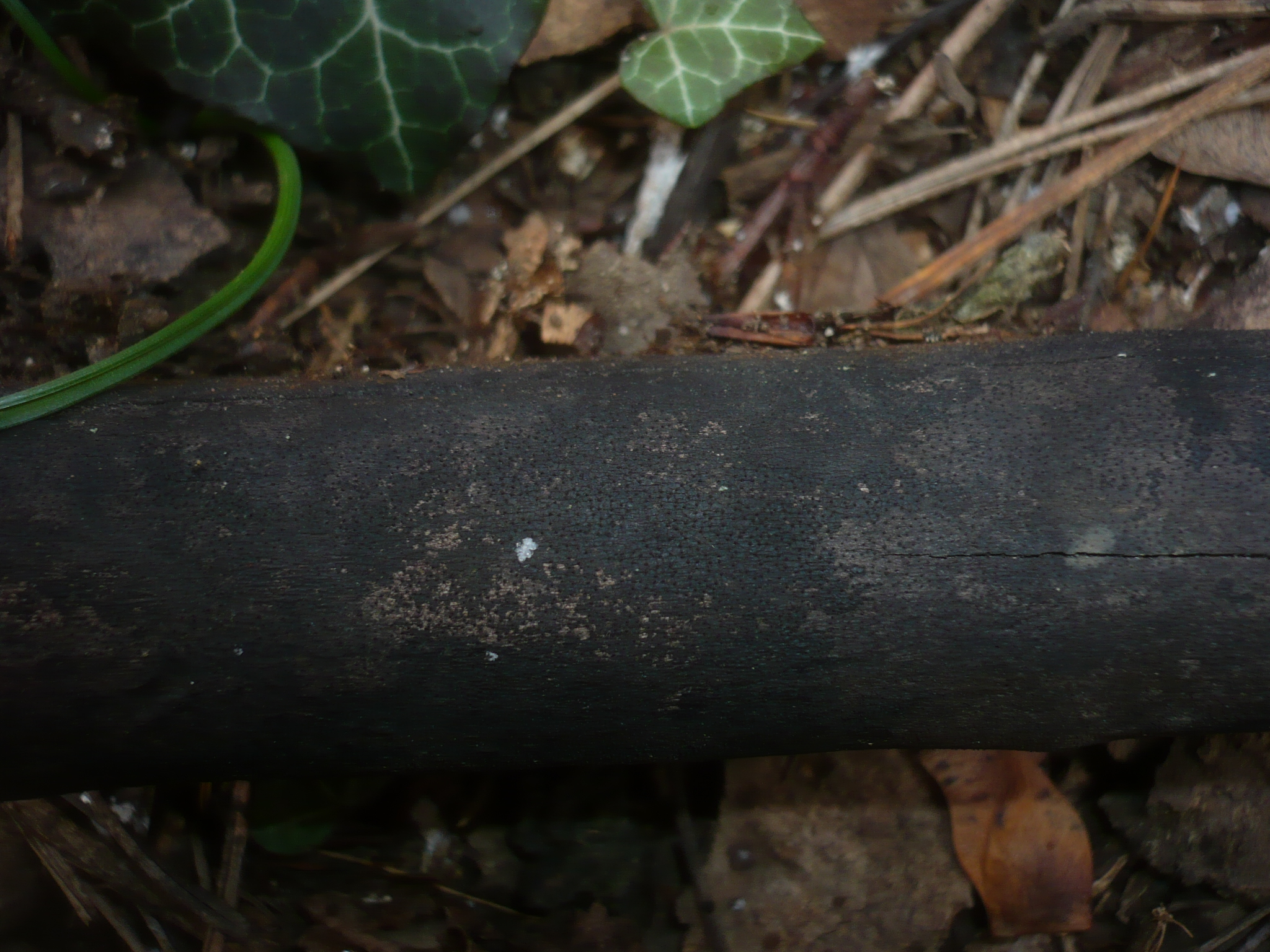
- Eutypa acharii

Scientific classification
- Domain: Eukaryota
- Kingdom: Fungi
- Division: Ascomycota
- Class: Sordariomycetes
- Order: Xylariales
- Family: Diatrypaceae
- Genus: Eutypa; Tul. & C.Tul. (1863)

Type species
- Eutypa lata (Pers.) Tul. & C.Tul. (1863)

Species
- 32, see text

Synonyms
- Epheliopsis Henn. (1908); Lageniformia Plunkett (1925)

= Eutypa =

Genus of fungi

Eutypa is a genus of fungi in the family Diatrypaceae. The widespread genus was estimated to contain 32 species in 2008, and then 68 by 2023. Anamorphic forms include the genera Libertella and Cytosporina. The genus was circumscribed in 1863 by the French mycologists and brothers Louis and Charles Tulasne.

Some species are frequently found as phytopathogens (parasitic organisms) of grape crops.

== Species ==
As accepted by Species Fungorum;

- Eutypa abscondita (Durieu & Mont.) Rappaz (1987)
- Eutypa alangii Rehm (1914)
- Eutypa araucariae Viégas (1945)
- Eutypa aspera (Nitschke) Fuckel (1870)
- Eutypa astroidea (Fr.) Rappaz (1987)
- Eutypa bacteriospora Rehm (1908)
- Eutypa barbosae Höhn. (1901)
- Eutypa camelliae Samarak., Jian K. Liu & K.D. Hyde (2022)
- Eutypa capparis Rehm (1914)
- Eutypa caulivora Massee (1910)
- Eutypa cerasi S.H. Long & Q.R. Li, (2021)
- Eutypa choseniae Lar.N. Vassiljeva (1998)
- Eutypa congesta Urries (1956)
- Eutypa conjuncta Petch (1922)
- Eutypa consobrina (Mont.) Rappaz (1987)
- Eutypa cremea Moyo, F. Halleen & L. Mostert (2018)
- Eutypa crustata (Fr.) Sacc. (1882)
- Eutypa daldiniana (De Not.) L.C. Tiffany & J.C. Gilman (1965)
- Eutypa diantherae (I.M. Lewis) Petr. (1934)
- Eutypa eutypoides (Ellis & Everh.) Petr. (1951)
- Eutypa flavovirens (Pers.) Tul. & C. Tul. (1863)
- Eutypa guaduae Henn. (1908)
- Eutypa guttulata D.A.C. Almeida, Gusmão & A.N. Mill. (2016)
- Eutypa heveana Saccas (1954)
- Eutypa hydnoidea (Fr.) Höhn. (1909)
- Eutypa hypoxantha (Lév.) Starbäck (1899)
- Eutypa iguazuensis Carmarán & Lar.N. Vassiljeva (2009)
- Eutypa inconspicua Rehm (1914)
- Eutypa koschkelovae Frolov (1970)
- Eutypa kusanoi Henn. (1902)
- Eutypa laevata (Nitschke) Sacc. (1882)
- Eutypa lagunensis Syd. & P. Syd. (1920)
- Eutypa lantanae M.S. Patil (1983)
- Eutypa lata (Pers.) Tul. & C. Tul. (1863)
- Eutypa leioplaca (Fr.) Fuckel (1864)
- Eutypa leptoplaca (Durieu & Mont.) Rappaz (1987)
- Eutypa lineolata Rehm (1916)
- Eutypa lonicerina Lar.N. Vassiljeva (1998)
- Eutypa ludibunda (Sacc.) Sacc. (1882)
- Eutypa maura (Fr.) Fuckel (1864)
- Eutypa megalosoma Rehm (1914)
- Eutypa microasca E. Grassi & Carmarán (2013)
- Eutypa microspora C. Moreau & M. Moreau (1951)
- Eutypa murrayae A.K. Kar & Maity (1980)
- Eutypa ontariensis (Ellis & Everh.) L.C. Tiffany & J.C. Gilman (1965)
- Eutypa orthosticha (Durieu & Mont.) Rappaz (1987)
- Eutypa palmensis Urries (1956)
- Eutypa paraguaya Speg. (1921)
- Eutypa petiolaris Cif. (1957)
- Eutypa podanthi Speg. (1921)
- Eutypa polycocca (Fr.) P. Karst. (1873)
- Eutypa polygramma Bres. (1915)
- Eutypa prorumpens (Wallr.) Sacc. (1882)
- Eutypa quercicola Rappaz (1987)
- Eutypa rattanicola J. Fröhl. & K.D. Hyde (2000)
- Eutypa scabrosa (Bull.) Auersw. (1868)
- Eutypa sheariana Berl. (1902)
- Eutypa sparsa Romell (1889)
- Eutypa spinosa (Pers.) Tul. & C. Tul. (1863)
- Eutypa spinosae Rieuf (1962)
- Eutypa stenopora (Tul. & C. Tul.) Sacc. (1928)
- Eutypa subtecta (Fr.) Fuckel (1870)
- Eutypa tarrietiae Henn. (1903)
- Eutypa tessariae Starbäck (1905)
- Eutypa tetragona (Duby) Sacc. (1882)
- Eutypa ulicis (Fr.) Sacc. (1882)
- Eutypa velutina (Westend. & Wallays) Sacc. (1875)
