= Quaternaria =

Scientific classification
- Domain: Eukaryota
- Kingdom: Fungi
- Division: Ascomycota
- Class: Sordariomycetes
- Order: Xylariales
- Family: Diatrypaceae
- Genus: Quaternaria; Tul. & C. Tul.

Type species
- Quaternaria persoonii Tul. & C. Tul.

Genus of fungi

Quaternaria is a genus of fungi in the family Diatrypaceae.
