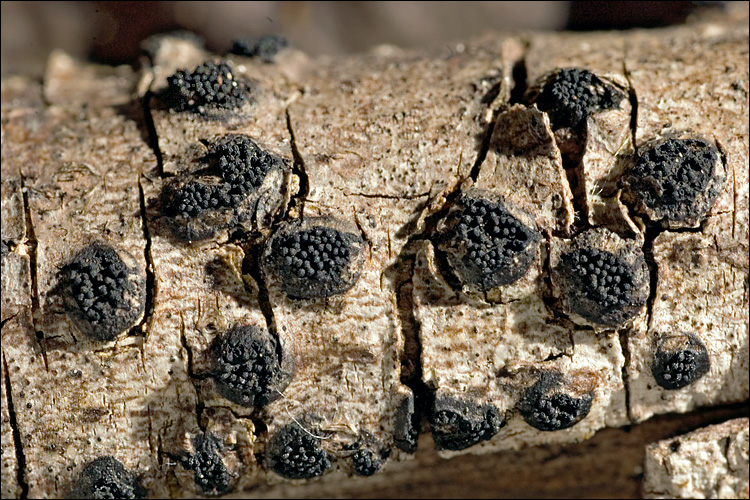
- Anthostoma decipiens

Scientific classification
- Domain: Eukaryota
- Kingdom: Fungi
- Division: Ascomycota
- Class: Sordariomycetes
- Order: Xylariales
- Family: Diatrypaceae
- Genus: Anthostoma; Nitschke

Type species
- Anthostoma decipiens (DC.) Nitschke

= Anthostoma =

Genus of fungi

Anthostoma is a genus of fungi in the family Diatrypaceae.
