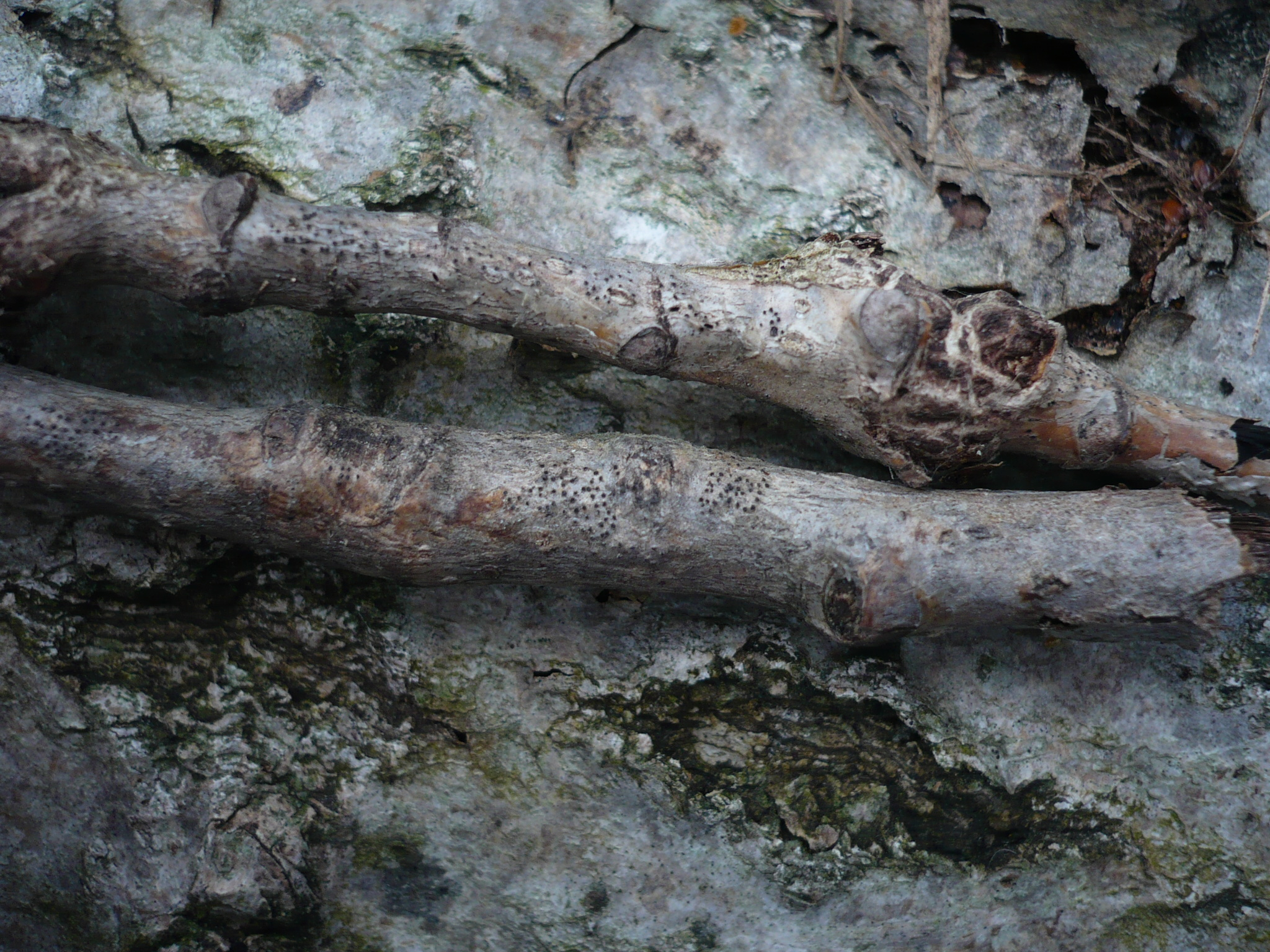
- Cryptosphaeria ligniota

Scientific classification
- Domain: Eukaryota
- Kingdom: Fungi
- Division: Ascomycota
- Class: Sordariomycetes
- Order: Xylariales
- Family: Diatrypaceae
- Genus: Cryptosphaeria; Ces. & De Not. (non Grev.)

Type species
- Cryptosphaeria millepunctata Grev.

= Cryptosphaeria =

Genus of fungi

Cryptosphaeria is a genus of fungi in the family Diatrypaceae. The genus has a widespread distribution in temperate regions, and contains eight species.
