= Libertella =

Scientific classification
- Domain: Eukaryota
- Kingdom: Fungi
- Division: Ascomycota
- Class: Sordariomycetes
- Order: Xylariales
- Family: Diatrypaceae
- Genus: Libertella; Desm.

Genus of fungi

Libertella is a genus of fungi belonging to the family Diatrypaceae.

The genus was first described by John Baptiste Henri Joseph Desmazières in 1830, and the genus name of Libertella is in honour of Marie-Anne Libert (1782-1865), who was a Belgian botanist and mycologist. She was one of the first women plant pathologists.

The genus has cosmopolitan distribution. Species:

- Libertella nigrificans
- Libertiella curvispora
