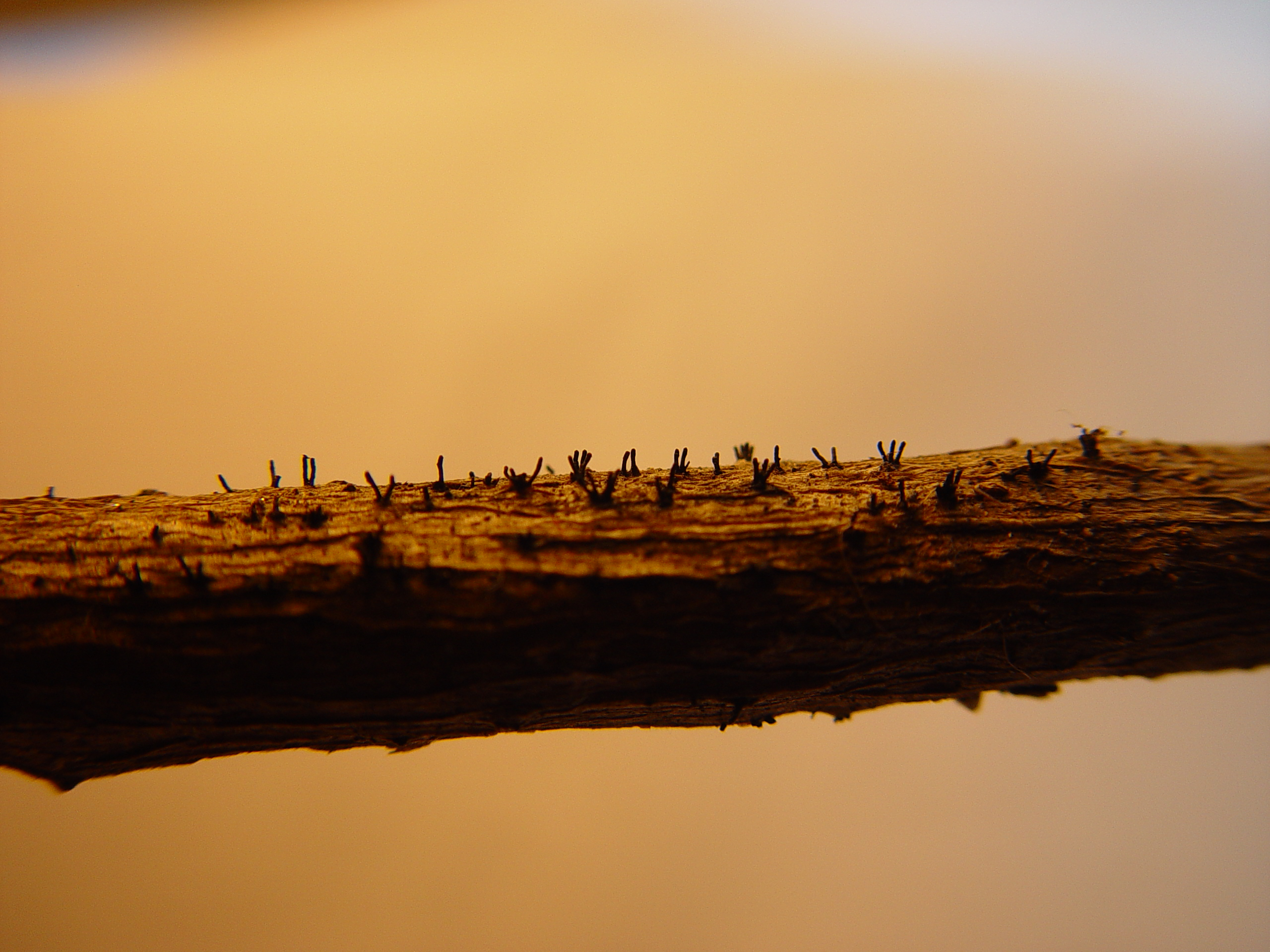
- Peroneutypa scoparia

Scientific classification
- Domain: Eukaryota
- Kingdom: Fungi
- Division: Ascomycota
- Class: Sordariomycetes
- Order: Xylariales
- Family: Diatrypaceae
- Genus: Peroneutypa; Berl.

Type species
- Peroneutypa bellula (Desm.) Berl.

= Peroneutypa =

Genus of fungi

Peroneutypa is a genus of fungi in the family Diatrypaceae.
