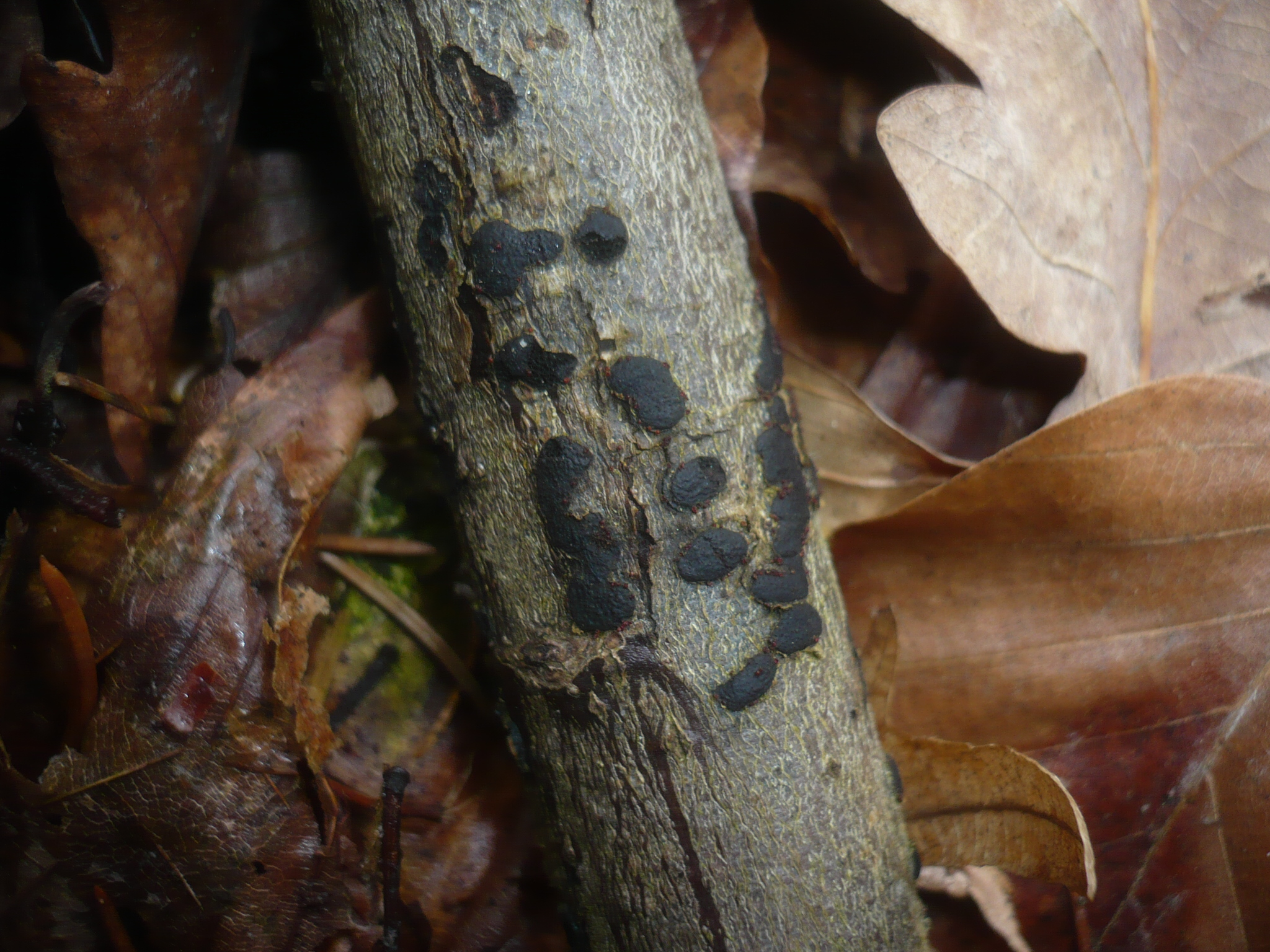
- Diatrype bullata

Scientific classification
- Domain: Eukaryota
- Kingdom: Fungi
- Division: Ascomycota
- Class: Sordariomycetes
- Order: Xylariales
- Family: Diatrypaceae
- Genus: Diatrype; Fr. (1849)

Type species
- Diatrype disciformis (Hoffm.) Fr.

= Diatrype =

Genus of fungi

Diatrype is a genus of carbonaceous pyrenomycetes in the family Diatrypaceae. The widespread genus contains 59 species, including Diatrype virescens.
