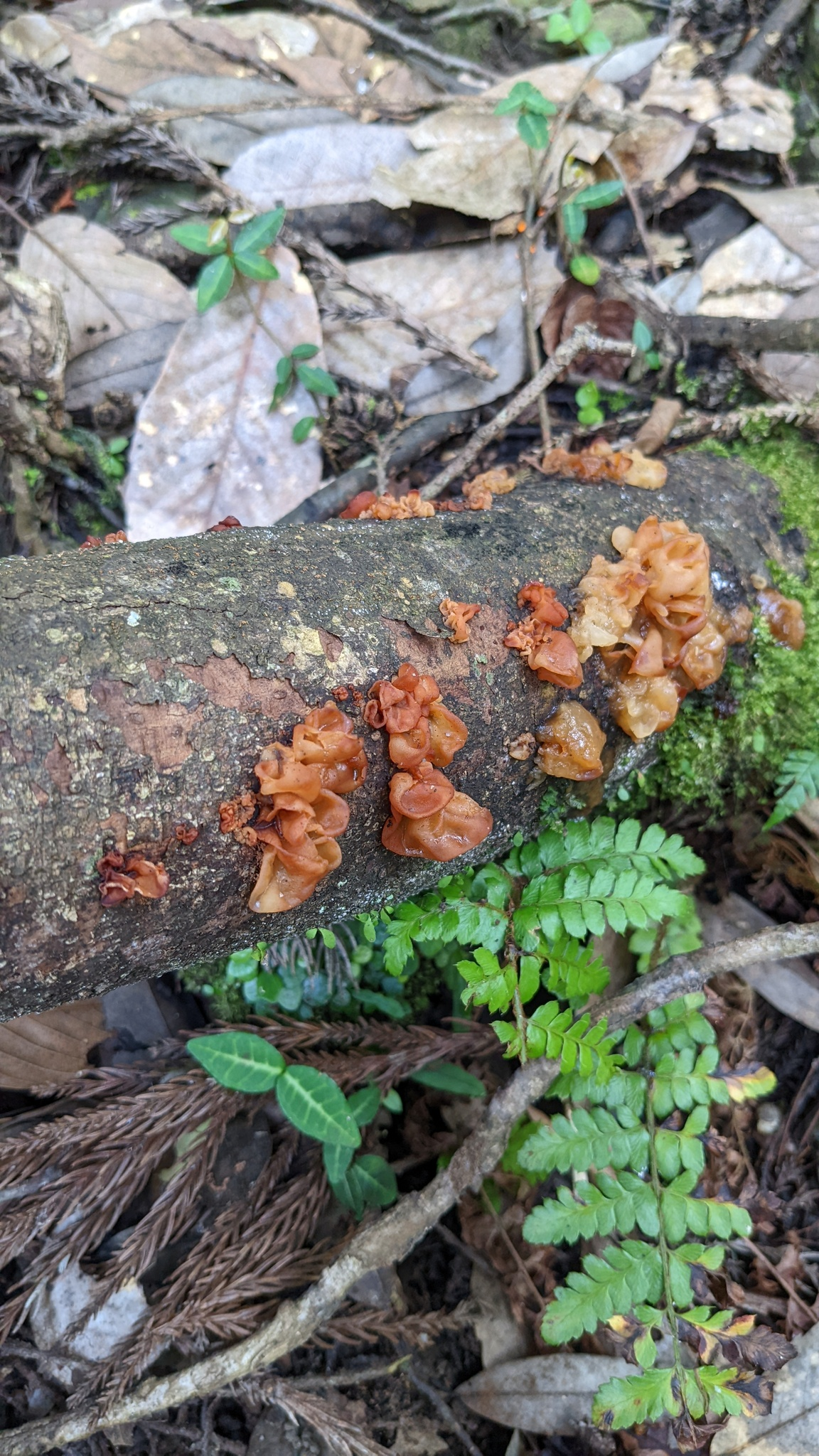
- Sirobasidium magnum

Scientific classification
- Kingdom: Fungi
- Division: Basidiomycota
- Class: Tremellomycetes
- Order: Tremellales
- Family: Sirobasidiaceae; Lindau (1897)

Genera
- Sirobasidium; Xenolachne

= Sirobasidiaceae =

Family of fungi

The Sirobasidiaceae are a family of fungi in the order Tremellales. Taxa are widespread, primarily tropical, and typically grow on wood and bark.
