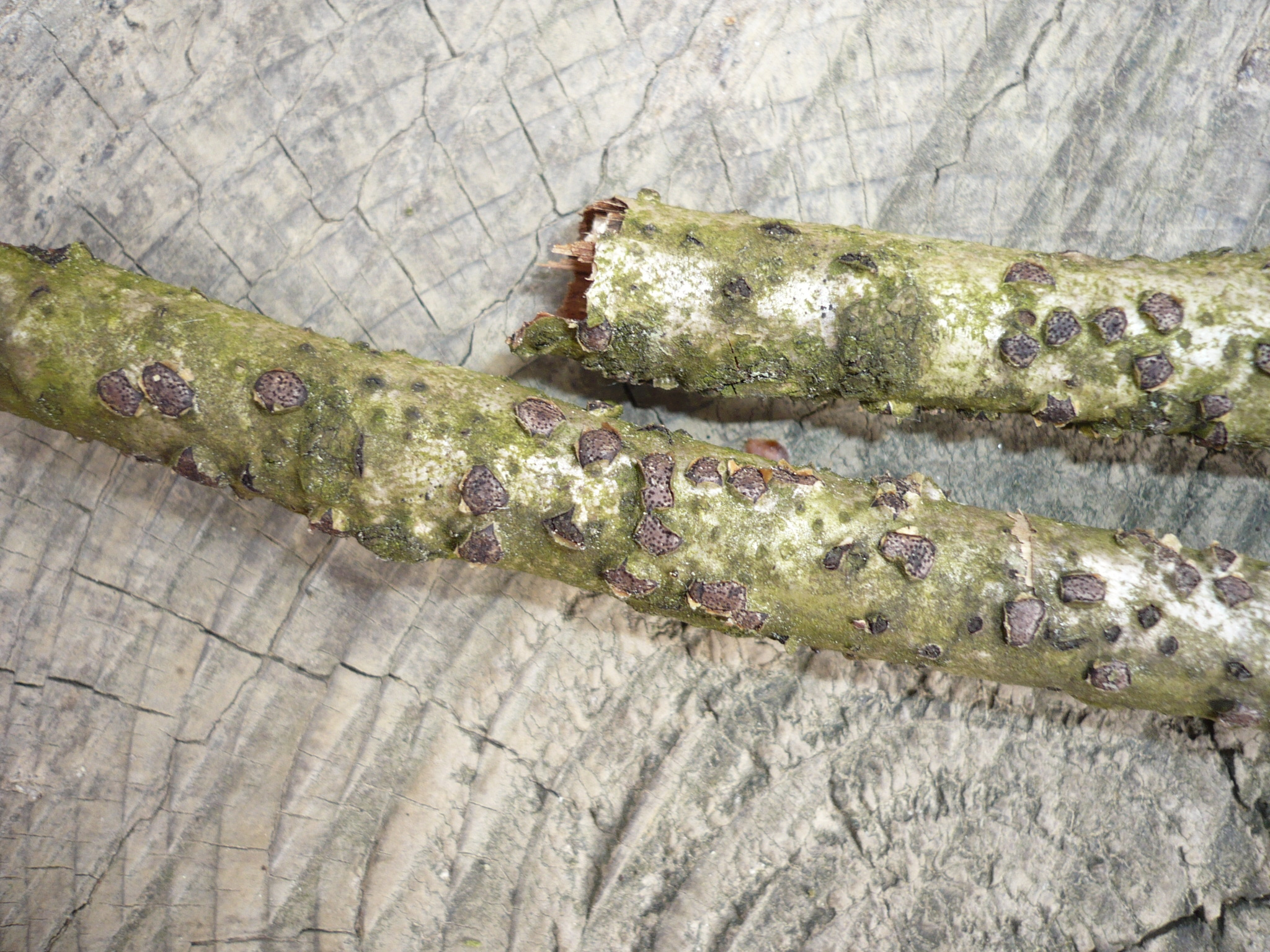
- Diatrypella quercina

Scientific classification
- Kingdom: Fungi
- Division: Ascomycota
- Class: Sordariomycetes
- Order: Xylariales
- Family: Diatrypaceae; Nitschke

Type genus
- Diatrype Fr.

Genera
- See text

= Diatrypaceae =

Family of fungi

The Diatrypaceae are a family of fungi in the order Xylariales. According to a 2008 estimate, the family has 13 genera and 229 species.

== Genera ==
Genera include:

- Allescherina
- Anthostoma
- Cryptosphaeria
- Diatrype
- Diatrypella
- Dothideovalsa
- Echinomyces
- Eutypa
- Eutypella
- Leptoperidia
- Libertella
- Peroneutypa
- Quaternaria
- Rostronitschkia
