= French Algeria =

Former French territory in North Africa (1830–1962)

French Algeria Algérie française (French) الجزائر الفرنسية (Arabic)
- 1830–1962
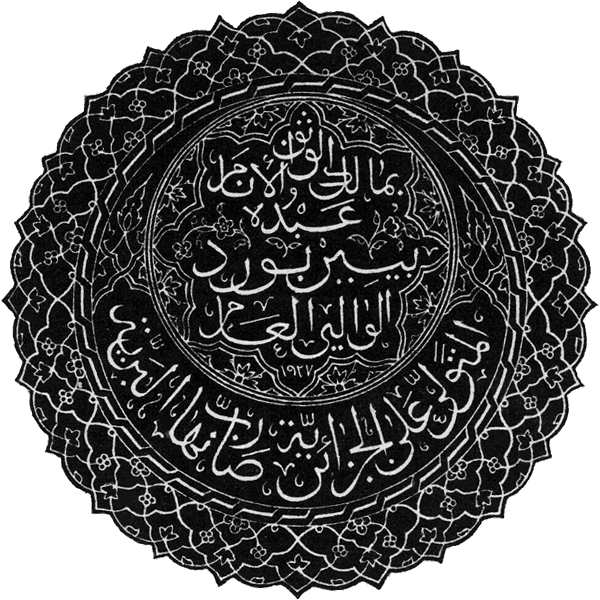
- Flag Seal
- Anthem: La Parisienne (1830–1848); Le Chant des Girondins (1848–1852); Partant pour la Syrie (1852–1870); La Marseillaise (1870–1962)
- Chronological map of French Algeria's evolution
- Status: 1830–1848: French colony 1848–1962: Part of France
- Capital and largest city: Algiers
- Official languages: French
- Common languages: French; Algerian Arabic; Berber languages; Hassaniya Arabic
- Religion: Islam (majority), Roman Catholicism, Judaism
- Governor General
  - 1830 (first): Louis-Auguste-Victor Bourmont
  - 1962 (last): Christian Fouchet
- Legislature: Algerian Assembly (1948–1956)
- History
  - Surrender of Algiers: 5 July 1830
  - Algerian Independence: 5 July 1962

Area
  - 1899: 585,814 km^{2} (226,184 sq mi)
  - 1962: 2,381,741 km² (919,595 sq mi)
- Currency: Budju (1830–1848); Franc (1848–1962)
Preceded by
Regency of Algiers
Emirate of Abdelkader
Kingdom of Beni Abbas
Kel Ahaggar
Succeeded by
Algeria

French Algeria, (Note: French: Alger until 1839, then Algérie afterwards; unofficially Algérie française) also known as Colonial Algeria, was a colony and later an integral part of France. French rule lasted from the beginning of the French conquest in 1830 until the end of the Algerian War which resulted in Algeria gaining independence on 5 July 1962.

The French conquest of Algeria began in 1830 with the invasion of Algiers which toppled the Regency of Algiers, though Algeria was not fully conquered and pacified until 1903. It is estimated that by 1875, between 500,000 and 1,000,000 Algerians had been killed from disease, starvation and violence. Various scholars describe the French conquest as genocide. French forces suffered 7,469 killed in action during the conquest by 1875, but suffered heavy losses from disease with another 110,000 dying in hospital. Algeria was ruled as a colony from 1830 to 1848, and then as multiple departments of France after the implementation of the 1848 French Constitution, a situation that lasted until Algerian independence in 1962. After a trip to Algiers in 1860, the French emperor Napoleon III became keen on establishing a client kingdom there which he would rule in a personal union, expanding freedoms for the indigenous population and limiting colonisation. This project was futile, however, and the newly established Third French Republic scrapped any plans for Algerian regional autonomy, even seeking to strengthen its hold by granting citizenship to Algeria's native Jewish population and propagating the Kabyle myth in what has been described as examples of divide and rule.

As a recognized jurisdiction of France, Algeria became a destination for hundreds of thousands of European settlers. They were first known as colons, and later as pieds-noirs, a term applied primarily to ethnic Europeans born in Algeria. The native Muslim population comprised the majority of the territory throughout its history. Gradually, dissatisfaction among the Muslim population, due to their lack of political and economic freedom, fueled calls for greater political autonomy, and eventually independence from France. The Sétif and Guelma massacre in 1945 marked a point of no return in Franco-Algerian relations and led to the outbreak of the Algerian War, which was characterised by the use of guerrilla warfare by National Liberation Front, and crimes against humanity by the French (including torture, rape and regroupment camps). The war ended in 1962, with Algeria gaining independence following the Évian Accords in March 1962 and a self-determination referendum in July 1962.

During its last years as part of France, Algeria was a founding member of the European Coal and Steel Community and the European Economic Community.

== Background ==
=== Initial conflicts ===
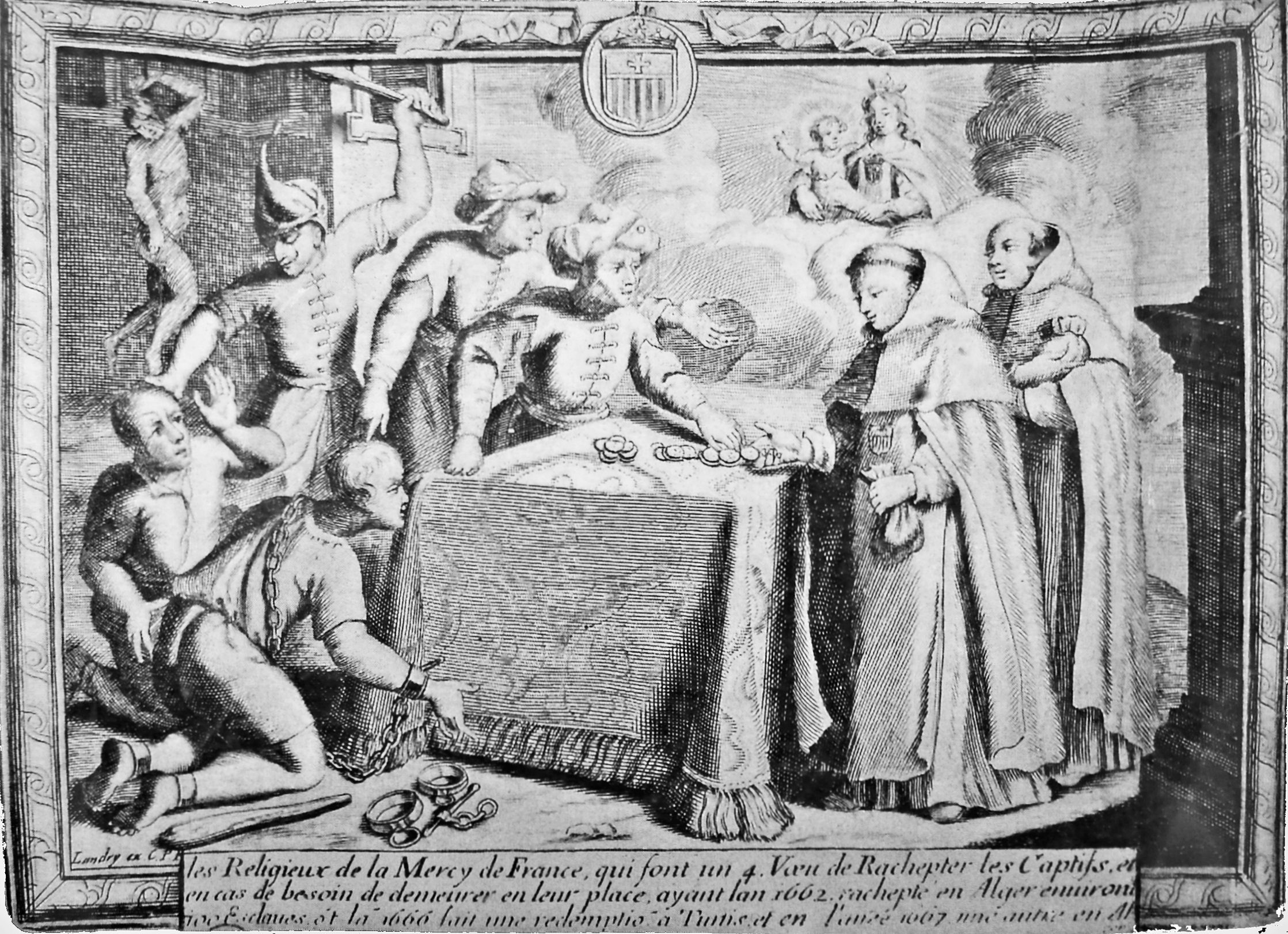
Purchase of Christian slaves by French monks in Algiers in 1662

Since the capture of Algiers in 1516 by the Ottoman admirals, brothers Oruç Reis and Hayreddin Barbarossa, Algeria had been a base for conflict and piracy in the Mediterranean basin. In 1681, French King Louis XIV asked Admiral Abraham Duquesne to fight the Barbary pirates. He also ordered a large-scale attack on Algiers between 1682 and 1683 on the pretext of assisting and rescuing enslaved Christians, usually Europeans taken as captives in raids. Again, Jean II d'Estrées bombarded Tripoli and Algiers from 1685 to 1688. An ambassador from Algiers visited the Court in Versailles, and a treaty was signed in 1690 that provided peace throughout the 18th century.

During the Directory regime of the French First Republic (1795–99), the Bakri and the Busnach, Jewish merchants of Algiers, provided large quantities of grain for Napoleon's soldiers who participated in the Italian campaign of 1796–1797. But Bonaparte refused to pay the bill, claiming it was excessive. In 1820, Louis XVIII paid back half of the Directory's debts. The Dey, who had loaned the Bacri 250,000 francs, requested the rest of the money from France.

The Dey of Algiers was weak politically, economically, and militarily. Algeria was then part of the Barbary States, along with Tunisia; these depended on the Ottoman Empire, then led by Mahmud II, but enjoyed relative independence. The Barbary Coast was the stronghold of the Barbary pirates, who carried out raids against European and American ships. Conflicts between the Barbary States and the newly independent United States of America culminated in the First (1801–05) and Second (1815) Barbary Wars. An Anglo-Dutch force, led by Admiral Lord Exmouth, carried out a punitive expedition, the August 1816 bombardment of Algiers. The Dey was forced to sign the Barbary treaties because the technological advantage of U.S., British, and French forces overwhelmed the Algerians' expertise at naval warfare.

Following the conquest under the July monarchy, France referred to the Algerian territories as "French possessions in North Africa". This was disputed by the Ottoman Empire, which had not given up its claim. In 1839 Marshal General Jean-de-Dieu Soult, Duke of Dalmatia, first named these territories as "Algeria".

=== French conquest of Algeria ===
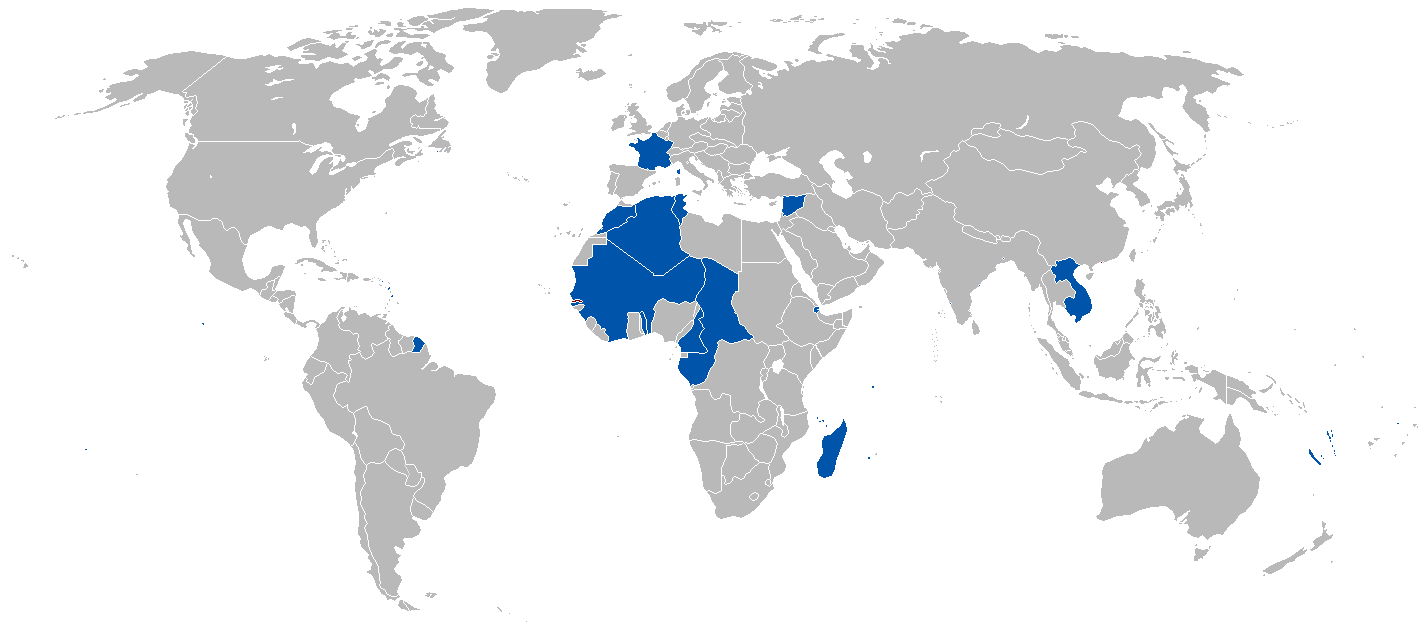
The French colonial empire in 1920

The invasion of Algeria was initiated in the last days of the Bourbon Restoration by Charles X, as an attempt to increase his popularity amongst the French people. He particularly hoped to appeal to the many veterans of the Napoleonic Wars who lived in Paris. His intention was to bolster patriotic sentiment, and distract attention from ineptly handled domestic policies by "skirmishing against the dey."

==== Fly Whisk Incident (April 1827) ====
In the 1790s, France had contracted to purchase wheat for the French army from two merchants in Algiers, Messrs. Bakri and Busnach, and was in arrears paying them. Bakri and Busnach owed money to the dey and claimed they could not pay it until France paid its debts to them. The dey had unsuccessfully negotiated with Pierre Deval, the French consul, to rectify this situation, and he suspected Deval of collaborating with the merchants against him, especially when the French government made no provisions in 1820 to pay the merchants. Deval's nephew Alexandre, the consul in Bône, further angered the dey by fortifying French storehouses in Bône and La Calle, contrary to the terms of prior agreements.

After a contentious meeting in which Deval refused to provide satisfactory answers on 29 April 1827, the dey struck Deval with his fly whisk. Charles X used this slight against his diplomatic representative to first demand an apology from the dey, and then to initiate a blockade against the port of Algiers. France demanded that the dey send an ambassador to France to resolve the incident. When the dey responded with cannon fire directed toward one of the blockading ships, the French determined that more forceful action was required.

==== Invasion of Algiers (June 1830) ====
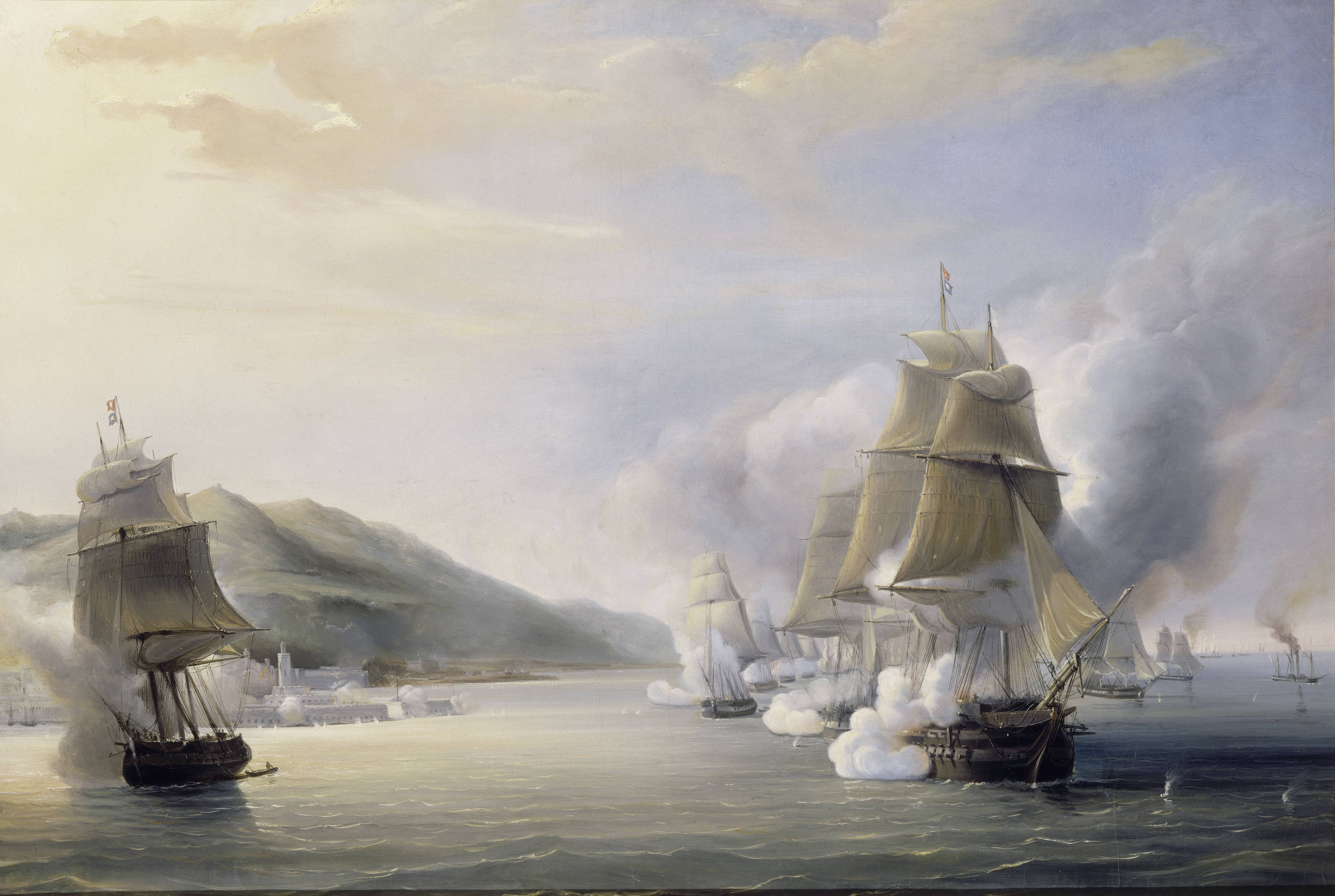
The attack of Admiral Duperré during the take-over of Algiers in 1830

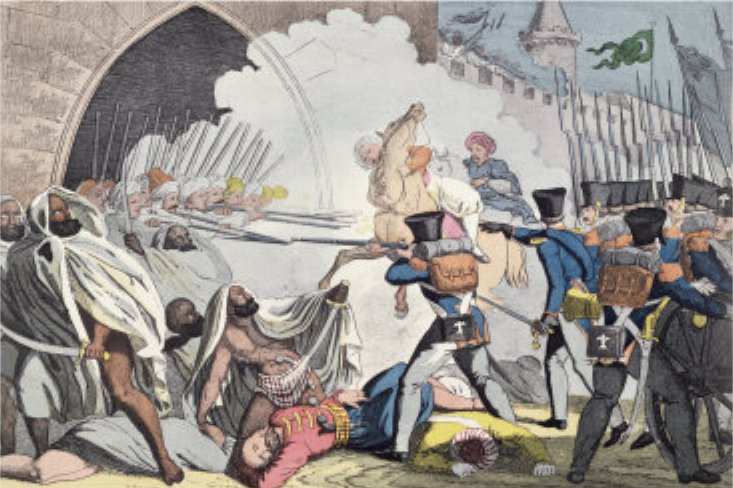
Fighting at the gates of Algiers in 1830

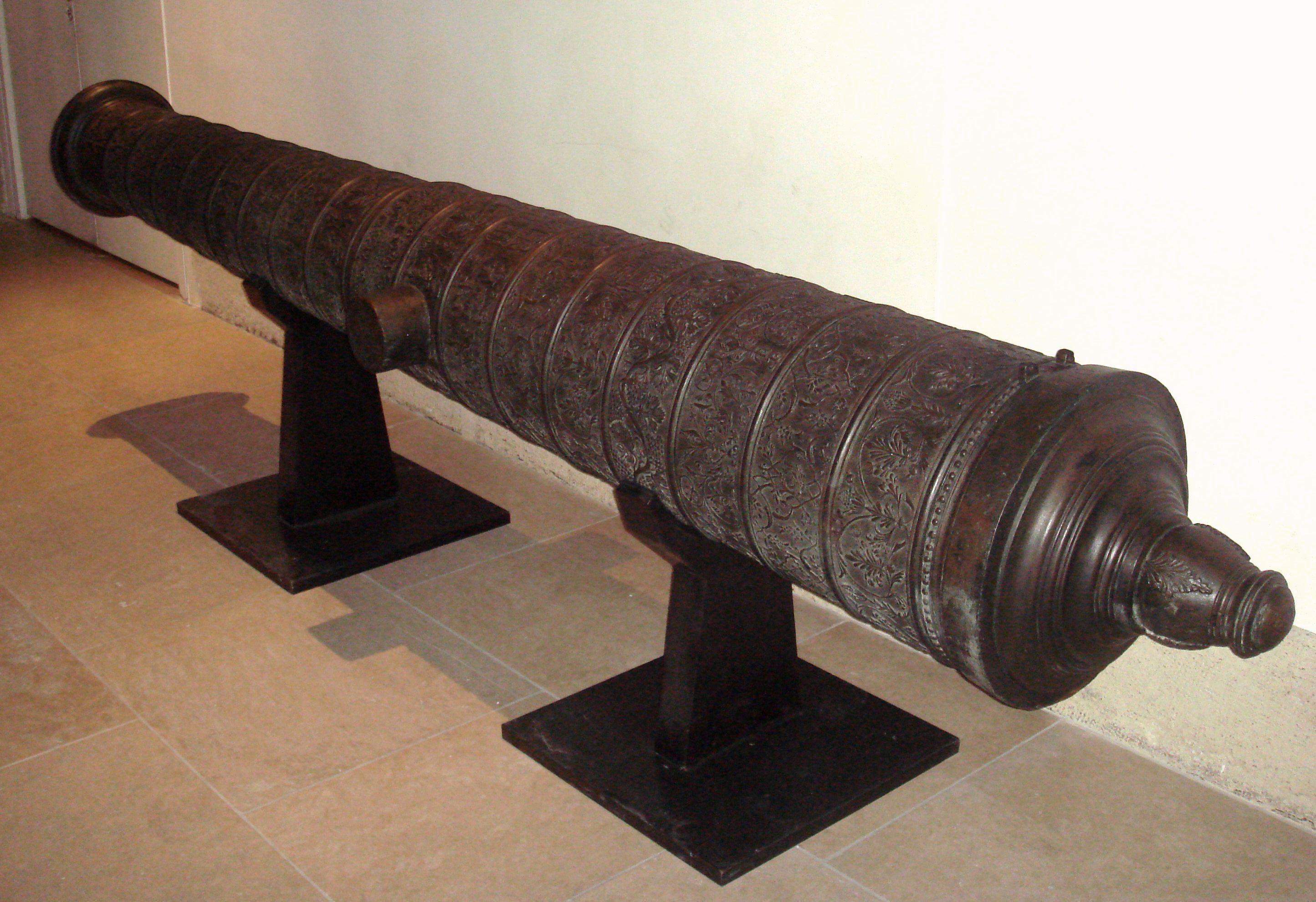
Ornate Ottoman cannon, length: 385 cm, cal:178mm, weight: 2910, stone projectile, founded 8 October 1581 in Algiers, seized by France at Algiers in 1830. Musée de l'Armée, Paris

Pierre Deval and other French residents of Algiers left for France, while the Minister of War, Clermont-Tonnerre, proposed a military expedition. However, the Count of Villèle, an ultra-royalist, President of the council and the monarch's heir, opposed any military action. The Bourbon Restoration government finally decided to blockade Algiers for three years. Meanwhile, the Barbary pirates were able to exploit the geography of the coast with ease. Before the failure of the blockade, the Restoration decided on 31 January 1830 to engage in a military expedition against Algiers.

Admiral Duperré commanded an armada of 600 ships that originated from Toulon, leading it to Algiers. Using Napoleon's 1808 contingency plan for the invasion of Algeria, General de Bourmont then landed 27 kilometres (17 mi) west of Algiers, at Sidi Ferruch on 14 June 1830, with 34,000 soldiers. In response to the French, the Dey of Algiers ordered an opposition consisting of 7,000 janissaries, 19,000 troops from the beys of Constantine and Oran, and about 17,000 Kabyles. The French established a strong beachhead and pushed toward Algiers, thanks in part to superior artillery and better organization. The French troops took the advantage on 19 June during the battle of Staouéli, and entered Algiers on 5 July after a three-week campaign. The dey agreed to surrender in exchange for his freedom and the offer to retain possession of his personal wealth. Five days later, he exiled himself with his family, departing on a French ship for the Italian Peninsula. 2,500 janissaries also quit the Algerian territories, heading for Asia, on 11 July.

The French army then recruited the first zouaves (a title given to certain light infantry regiments) in October, followed by the spahis regiments, while France expropriated all the land properties belonging to the Turkish settlers, known as Beliks. In the western region of Oran, Sultan Abd al-Rahman of Morocco, the Commander of the Faithful, could not remain indifferent to the massacres committed by the French Christian troops and to belligerent calls for jihad from the marabouts. Despite the diplomatic rupture between Morocco and the Two Sicilies in 1830, and the naval warfare engaged against the Austrian Empire as well as with Spain, then headed by Ferdinand VII, Sultan Abd al-Rahman lent his support to the Algerian insurgency of Emir Abd al-Qadir. The latter fought for years against the French. Directing an army of 12,000 men, Abd al-Qadir first organized the blockade of Oran.

Algerian refugees were welcomed by the Moroccan population, while the Sultan recommended that the authorities of Tetouan assist them by providing jobs in the administration or the military forces. The inhabitants of Tlemcen, near the Moroccan border, asked that they be placed under the Sultan's authority in order to escape the invaders. Abd al-Rahman named his nephew Prince Moulay Ali Caliph of Tlemcen, charged with the protection of the city. In retaliation, France executed two Moroccans, Mohamed Beliano and Benkirane, as spies, while their goods were seized by the military governor of Oran, Pierre François Xavier Boyer.

Hardly had the news of the capture of Algiers reached Paris than Charles X was deposed during the July Revolution in 1830, and his cousin Louis-Philippe, the "citizen king", was named to preside over a constitutional monarchy. The new government, composed of liberal opponents of the Algiers expedition, was reluctant to pursue the conquest begun by the old regime, but withdrawing from Algeria proved more difficult than conquering it.

Alexis de Tocqueville's views on Algeria were instrumental in its brutal and formal colonization. He advocated for a mixed system of "total domination and total colonization" whereby French military would wage total war against civilian populations while a colonial administration would provide rule of law and property rights to settlers within French occupied cities.

==== Characterization as genocide ====
Some governments and scholars have called France's conquest of Algeria a genocide. For example, Ben Kiernan, an Australian expert on the Cambodian genocide, wrote in Blood and Soil: A World History of Genocide and Extermination from Sparta to Darfur on the French conquest of Algeria:

By 1875, the French conquest was complete. The war had killed approximately 825,000 indigenous Algerians since 1830. A long shadow of genocidal hatred persisted, provoking a French author to protest in 1882 that in Algeria, "we hear it repeated every day that we must expel the native and, if necessary, destroy him." As a French statistical journal urged five years later, "the system of extermination must give way to a policy of penetration."

When France recognized the Armenian genocide, Turkey accused France of having committed genocide against 15% of Algeria's population.

== Popular revolts against the French annexation ==
=== Conquest of the Algerian territories under the July Monarchy (1830–1848) ===
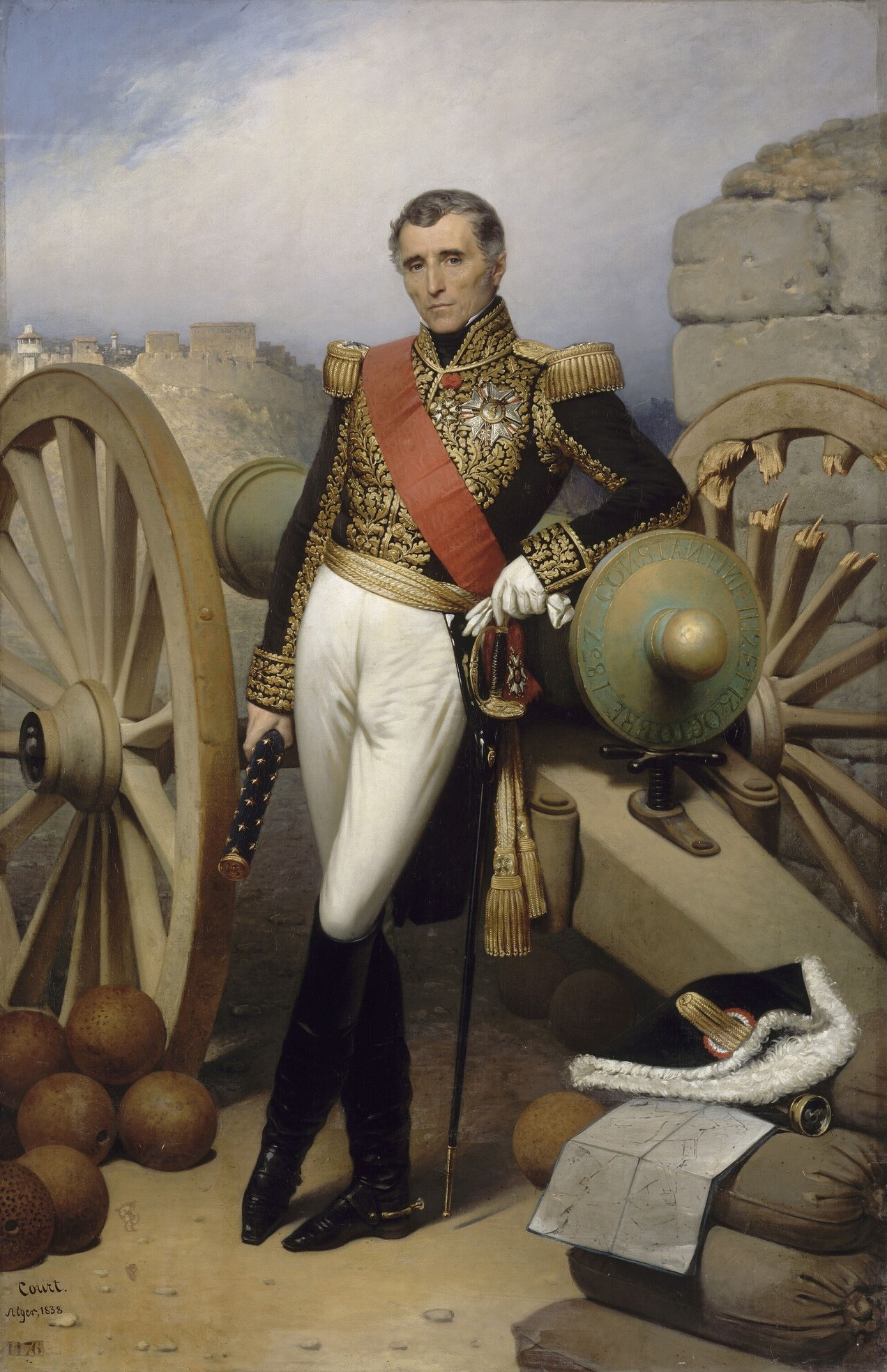
Portrait of Sylvain Charles Valée by Joseph-Désiré Court, 1838

On 1 December 1830, King Louis-Philippe named the Duc de Rovigo as head of military staff in Algeria. De Rovigo took control of Bône and initiated colonisation of the land. He was recalled in 1833 due to the overtly violent nature of the repression. Wishing to avoid a conflict with Morocco, Louis-Philippe sent an extraordinary mission to the sultan, mixed with displays of military might, sending war ships to the Bay of Tangier. An ambassador was sent to Sultan Abd al-Rahman of Morocco in February 1832, headed by the Count Charles-Edgar de Mornay and including the painter Eugène Delacroix. However the sultan refused French demands that he evacuate Tlemcen.

In 1834, France annexed as a colony the occupied areas of Algeria, which had an estimated Muslim population of about two million. Colonial administration in the occupied areas – the so-called régime du sabre (government of the sword) – was placed under a governor-general, a high-ranking army officer invested with civil and military jurisdiction, who was responsible to the minister of war. Marshal Bugeaud, who became the first governor-general, headed the conquest.

Soon after the conquest of Algiers, the soldier-politician Bertrand Clauzel and others formed a company to acquire agricultural land and, despite official discouragement, to subsidize its settlement by European farmers, triggering a land rush. Clauzel recognized the farming potential of the Mitidja Plain and envisioned the large-scale production there of cotton. As governor-general (1835–36), he used his office to make private investments in land and encouraged army officers and bureaucrats in his administration to do the same. This development created a vested interest among government officials in greater French involvement in Algeria. Commercial interests with influence in the government also began to recognize the prospects for profitable land speculation in expanding the French zone of occupation. They created large agricultural tracts, built factories and businesses, and hired local labor.

Among others testimonies, Lieutenant-colonel Lucien de Montagnac wrote on 15 March 1843, in a letter to a friend:

All populations who do not accept our conditions must be despoiled. Everything must be seized, devastated, without age or sex distinction: grass must not grow any more where the French army has set foot. Who wants the end wants the means, whatever may say our philanthropists. I personally warn all good soldiers whom I have the honour to lead that if they happen to bring me a living Arab, they will receive a beating with the flat of the saber.... This is how, my dear friend, we must make war against Arabs: kill all men over the age of fifteen, take all their women and children, load them onto naval vessels, send them to the Marquesas Islands or elsewhere. In one word, annihilate everything that will not crawl beneath our feet like dogs.

Whatever initial misgivings Louis Philippe's government may have had about occupying Algeria, the geopolitical realities of the situation created by the 1830 intervention argued strongly for reinforcing French presence there. France had reason for concern that Britain, which was pledged to maintain the territorial integrity of the Ottoman Empire, would move to fill the vacuum left by a French withdrawal. The French devised elaborate plans for settling the hinterland left by Ottoman provincial authorities in 1830, but their efforts at state-building were unsuccessful on account of lengthy armed resistance.

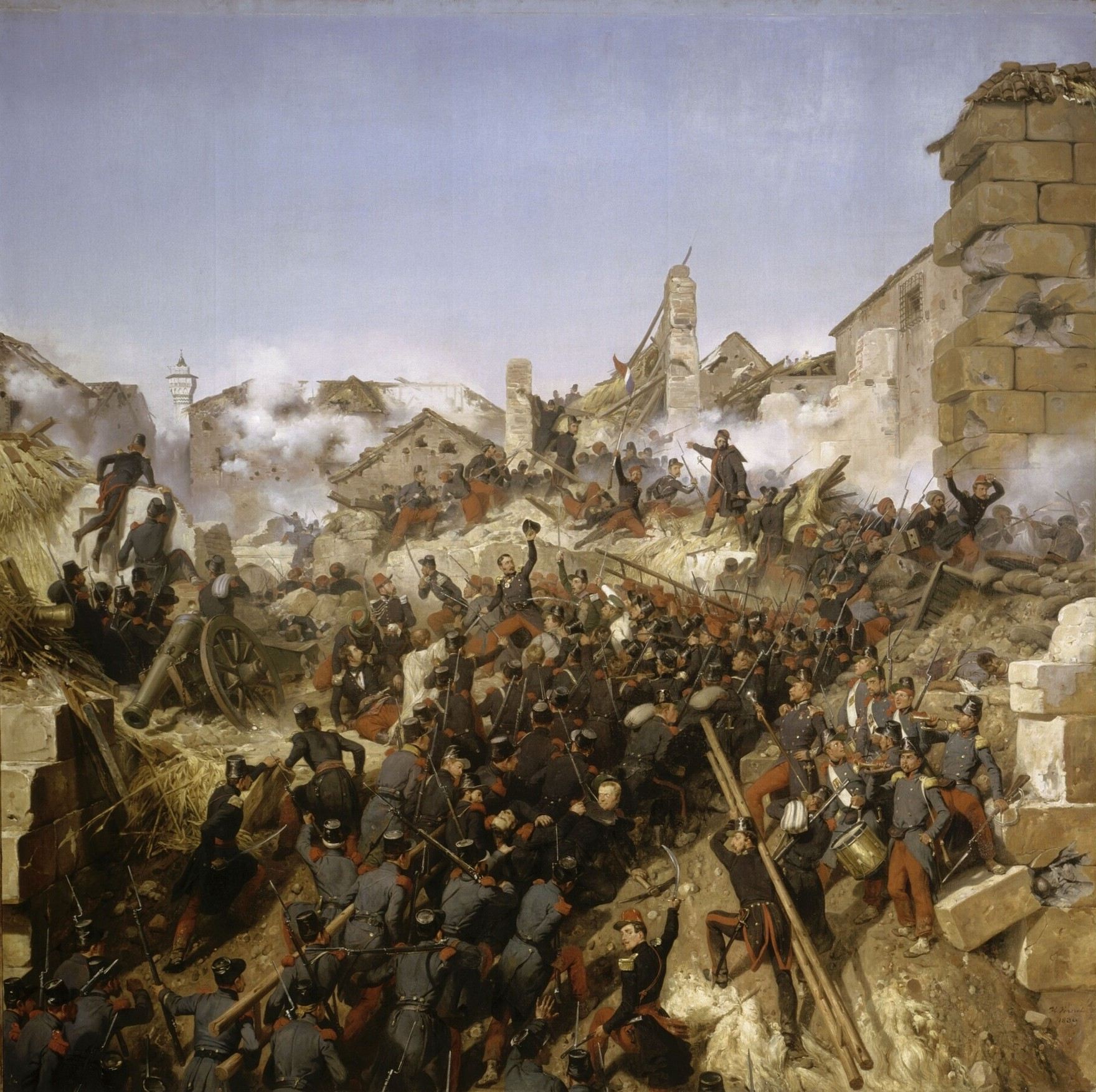
The Siege of Constantine by Horace Vernet. The capture of Constantine by French troops, 13 October 1837.

The most successful local opposition immediately after the fall of Algiers was led by Ahmad ibn Muhammad, bey of Constantine. He initiated a radical overhaul of the Ottoman administration in his beylik by replacing Turkish officials with local leaders, making Arabic the official language, and attempting to reform finances according to the precepts of Islam. After the French failed in several attempts to gain some of the bey's territories through negotiation, an ill-fated invasion force, led by Bertrand Clauzel, had to retreat from Constantine in 1836 in humiliation and defeat. However, the French captured Constantine under Sylvain Charles Valée the following year, on 13 October 1837.

Historians generally set the indigenous population of Algeria at 3 million in 1830. Although the Algerian population decreased at some point under French rule, most certainly between 1866 and 1872, the French military was not fully responsible for the extent of this decrease, as some of these deaths could be explained by the locust plagues of 1866 and 1868, as well as by a rigorous winter in 1867–68, which caused a famine followed by an epidemic of cholera.

=== Resistance of Lalla Fatma N'Soumer ===
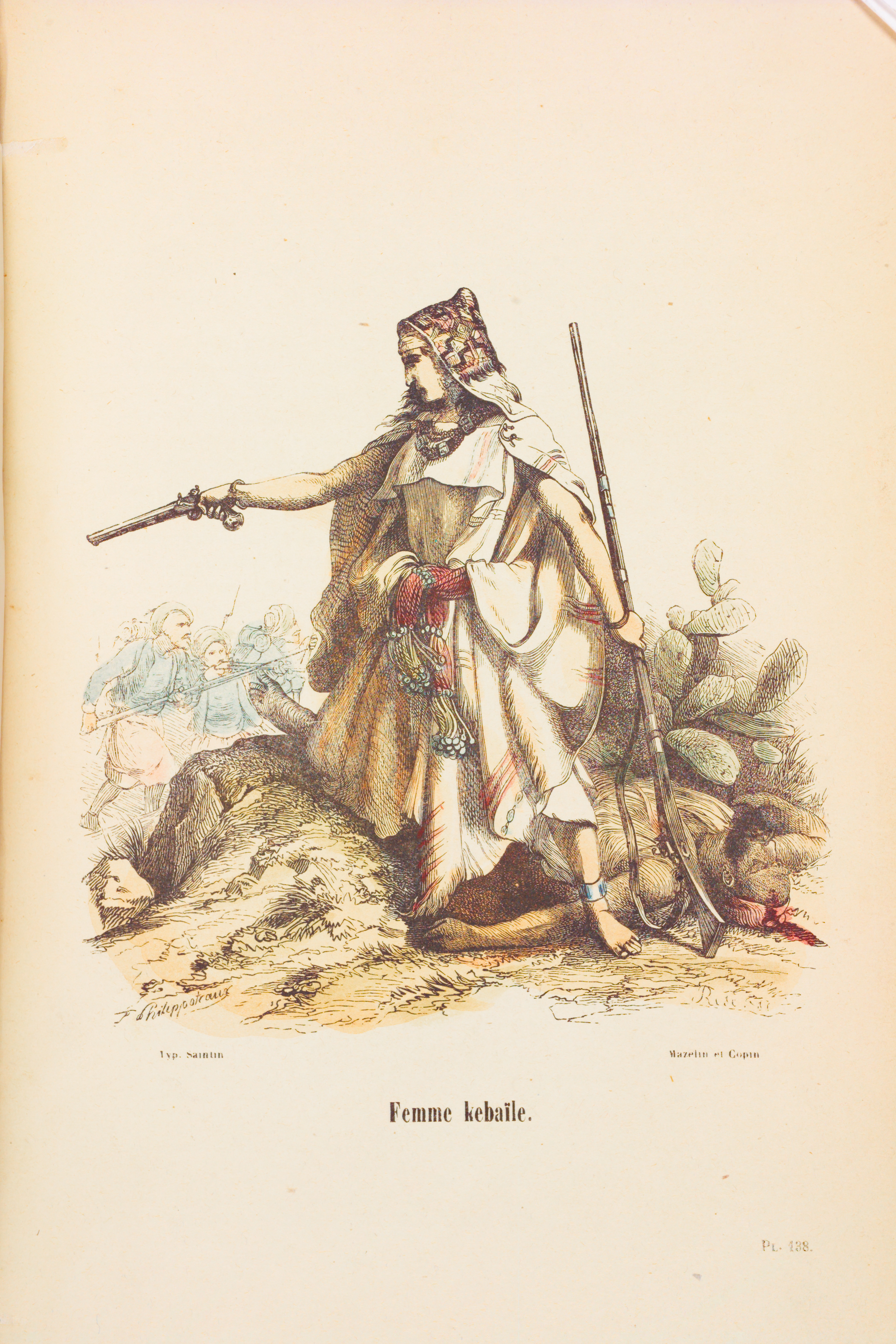
A print showing Fadhma N'Soumer during combat

The French began their occupation of Algiers in 1830, starting with a landing in Algiers. As occupation turned into colonization, Kabylia remained the only region independent of the French government. Pressure on the region increased, and the will of her people to resist and defend Kabylia increased as well.

In about 1849, a mysterious man arrived in Kabylia. He presented himself as Mohamed ben Abdallah, but is more commonly known as Sherif Boubaghla. He was probably a former lieutenant in the army of Emir Abdelkader, defeated for the last time by the French in 1847. Boubaghla refused to surrender at that battle, and retreated to Kabylia. From there he began a war against the French armies and their allies, often employing guerrilla tactics. Boubaghla was a relentless fighter, and very eloquent in Arabic. He was very religious, and some legends tell of his thaumaturgic skills.

Boubaghla went often to Lalla Fatma N'Soumer to talk with high-ranking members of the religious community, and Lalla Fatma was soon attracted by his strong personality. At the same time, the relentless combatant was attracted by a woman so resolutely willing to contribute, by any means possible, to the war against the French. With her inspiring speeches, she convinced many men to fight as imseblen (volunteers ready to die as martyrs) and she herself, together with other women, participated in combat by providing cooking, medicines, and comfort to the fighting forces.

Traditional sources tell that a strong bond was formed between Lalla Fatma and Boubaghla. She saw this as a wedding of peers, rather than the traditional submission as a slave to a husband. In fact, at that time Boubaghla left his first wife (Fatima Bent Sidi Aissa) and sent back to her owner a slave he had as a concubine (Halima Bent Messaoud). But on her side, Lalla Fatma wasn't free: even if she was recognized as tamnafeqt ("woman who left her husband to get back to his family," a Kabylia institution), the matrimonial tie with her husband was still in place, and only her husband's will could free her. However he did not agree to this, even when offered large bribes. The love between Fatma and Boubaghla remained platonic, but there were public expressions of this feeling between the two.

Fatma was personally present at many fights in which Boubaghla was involved, particularly the battle of Tachekkirt won by Boubaghla forces (18–19 July 1854), where the French general Jacques Louis César Randon was caught but managed to escape later. On 26 December 1854, Boubaghla was killed; some sources claim it was due to treason of some of his allies. The resistance was left without a charismatic leader and a commander able to guide it efficiently. For this reason, during the first months of 1855, on a sanctuary built on top of the Azru Nethor peak, not far from the village where Fatma was born, there was a great council among combatants and important figures of the tribes in Kabylia. They decided to grant Lalla Fatma, assisted by her brothers, the command of combat.

=== Resistance of Emir Abd al-Qadir ===
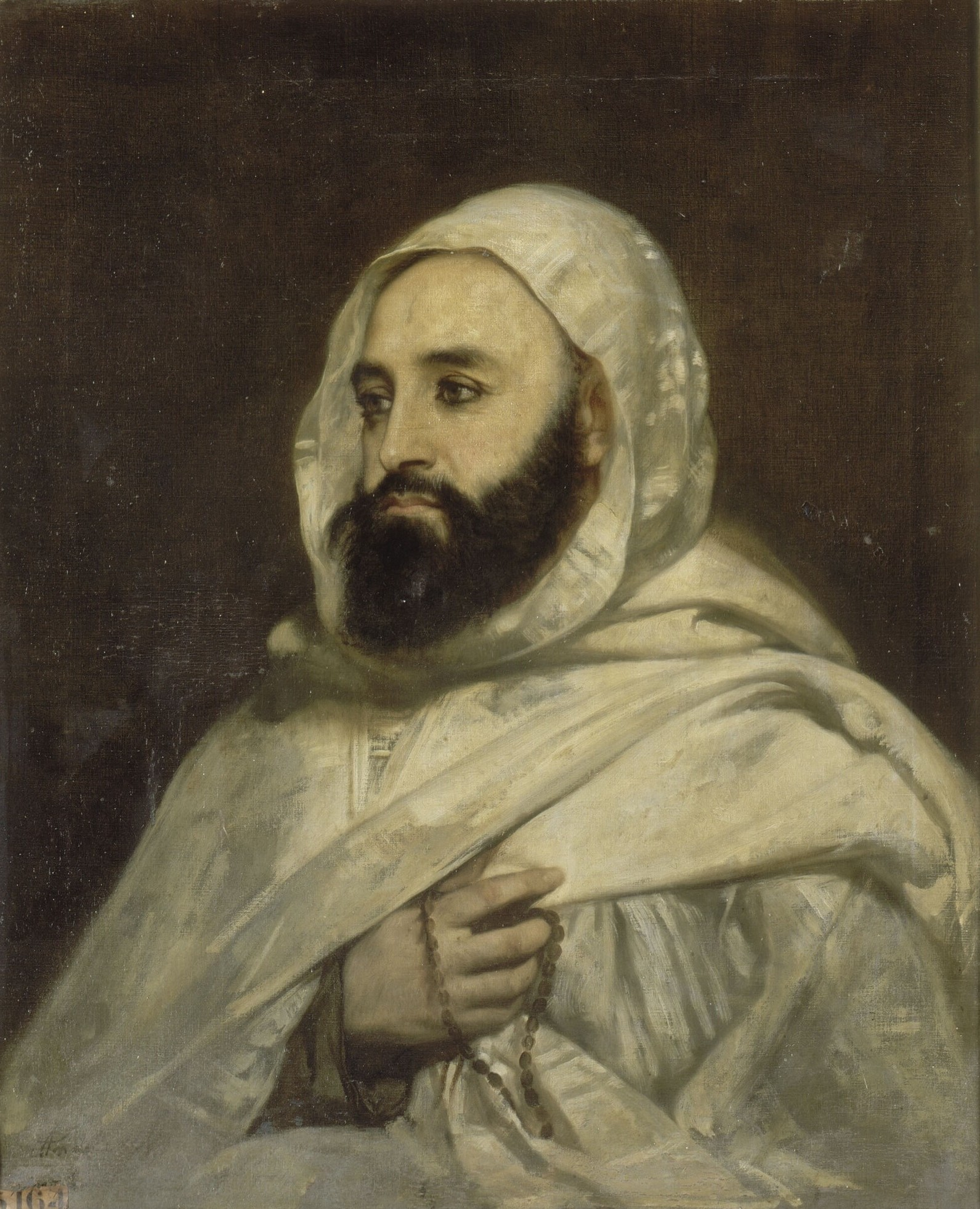
Abd al Qadir

The French faced other opposition as well in the area. The superior of a religious brotherhood, Muhyi ad-Din, who had spent time in Ottoman jails for opposing the bey's rule, launched attacks against the French and their makhzen allies at Oran in 1832. In the same year, jihad was declared and to lead it tribal elders chose Muhyi ad-Din's son, twenty-five-year-old Abd al-Qadir. Abd al-Qadir, who was recognized as Amir al-Muminin (commander of the faithful), quickly gained the support of tribes throughout Algeria. A devout and austere marabout, he was also a cunning political leader and a resourceful warrior. From his capital in Tlemcen, Abd al-Qadir set about building a territorial Muslim state based on the communities of the interior but drawing its strength from the tribes and religious brotherhoods. By 1839, he controlled more than two-thirds of Algeria. His government maintained an army and a bureaucracy, collected taxes, supported education, undertook public works, and established agricultural and manufacturing cooperatives to stimulate economic activity.

The French in Algiers viewed with concern the success of a Muslim government and the rapid growth of a viable territorial state that barred the extension of European settlement. Abd al-Qadir fought running battles across Algeria with French forces, which included units of the Foreign Legion, organized in 1831 for Algerian service. Although his forces were defeated by the French under General Thomas Bugeaud in 1836, Abd al-Qadir negotiated a favorable peace treaty the next year. The treaty of Tafna gained conditional recognition for Abd al Qadir's regime by defining the territory under its control and salvaged his prestige among the tribes just as the shaykhs were about to desert him. To provoke new hostilities, the French deliberately broke the treaty in 1839 by occupying Constantine. Abd al-Qadir took up the holy war again, destroyed the French settlements on the Mitidja Plain, and at one point advanced to the outskirts of Algiers itself. He struck where the French were weakest and retreated when they advanced against him in greater strength. The government moved from camp to camp with the amir and his army. Gradually, however, superior French resources and manpower and the defection of tribal chieftains took their toll. Reinforcements poured into Algeria after 1840 until Bugeaud had at his disposal 108,000 men, one-third of the French army.

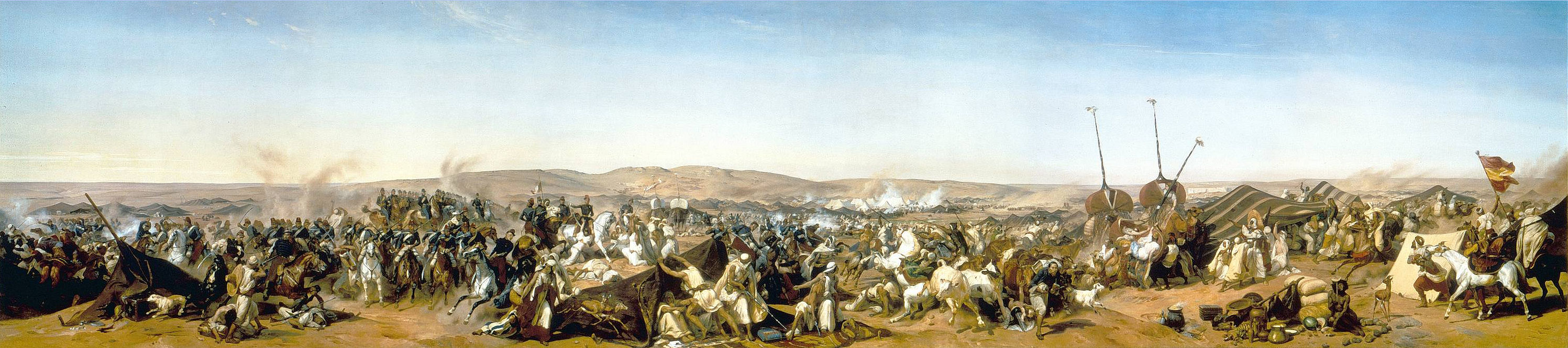
The Battle of Smala, 16 May 1843. Prise de la smalah d Abd-El-Kader à Taguin. 16 mai 1843, by Horace Vernet

One by one, the amir's strongholds fell to the French, and many of his ablest commanders were killed or captured so that by 1843 the Muslim state had collapsed.

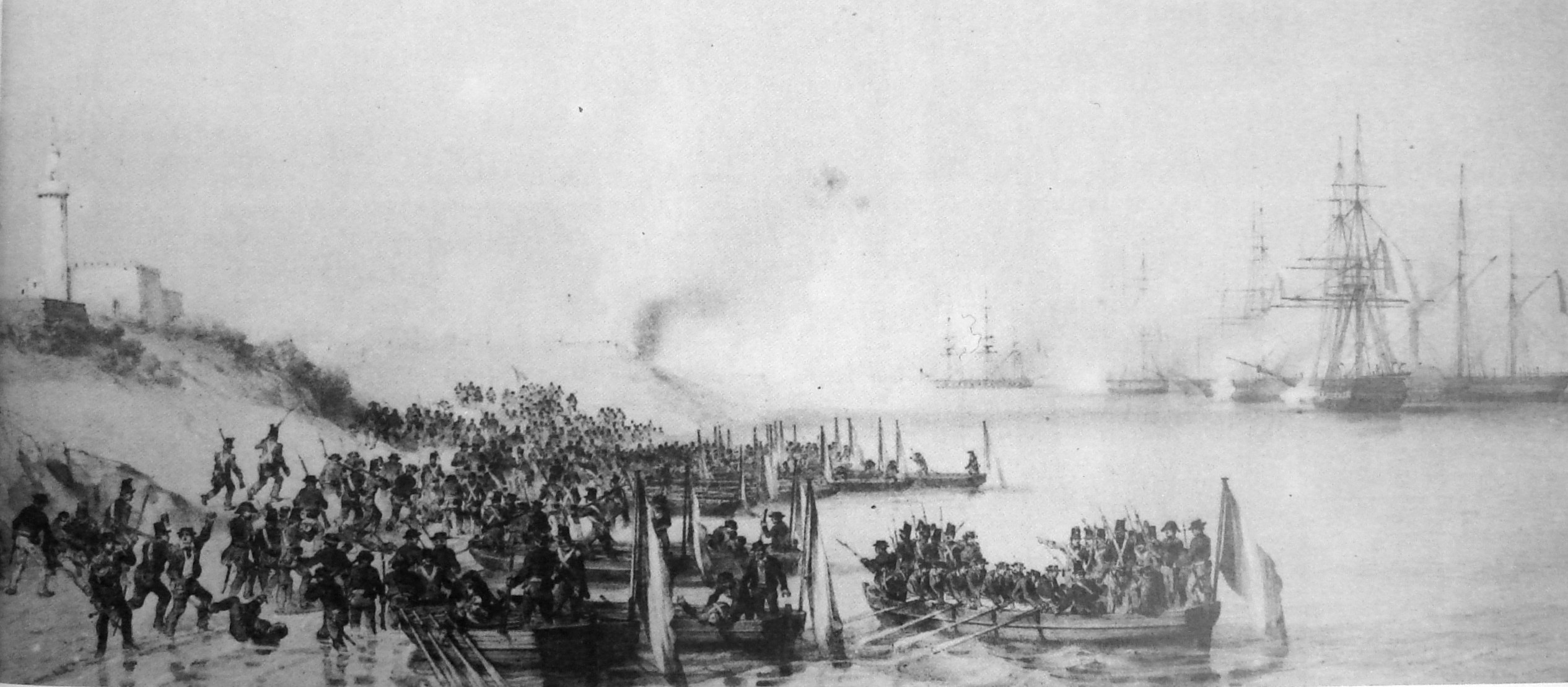
French troops disembarking on the island of Mogador, in Essaouira bay in 1844

Abd al-Qadir took refuge in 1841 with his ally, the sultan of Morocco, Abd al-Rahman II, and launched raids into Algeria. This alliance led the French Navy to bombard and briefly occupy Mogador (Essaouira) under the Prince de Joinville on August 16, 1844. A French force was destroyed at the Battle of Sidi-Brahim in 1845. However, Abd al-Qadir was obliged to surrender to the commander of Oran Province, General Louis de Lamoricière, at the end of 1847.

Abd al-Qadir was promised safe conduct to Egypt or Palestine if his followers laid down their arms and kept the peace. He accepted these conditions, but the minister of war – who years earlier as general in Algeria had been badly defeated by Abd al-Qadir – had him consigned in France in the Château d'Amboise.

== Demographics ==
=== Population ===
The Arabs formed the majority of French Algeria's population, with a Berber minority also present. This enabled France to employ a divide and rule strategy, pitting the ethnic groups against each other by favoring the Kabyle Berbers. The Kabyle myth asserted that Kabyle Berbers had more in common with the French than Arab culture, sharing a supposed Roman ancestry, prompting the French to push French cuisine and encouraged intermarriage to "rescue" the Kabyles from the "decadence" caused by centuries of contact with Arabs. In 1857, the French created a separate administration for the Kabyles, offering them a favorable tax policy, judicial autonomy, and governance by tribal and customary laws. This was supposedly aimed at isolating the Arab majority socially, economically, and politically, while establishing a Francophile intellectual elite.

It is estimated that the native Algerian population fell by up to one-third between 1830 and 1875. The population experienced an almost constant decline during the period of French conquest until a low point in 1872, before rebounding to three million in 1884. The biggest fall occurred in the 1860s. Demographer Kamel Kateb estimates the population at 2.7 million in 1861 before falling to 2.1 million in 1871 following a series of famines, epidemics and also due to emigration. A famine and Cholera epidemic between 1866 and 1868 in particular would claim more than 10% of Algeria's population, with between 300,000 and 500,000 deaths.

=== European settlers ===
By 1847, the population of Europeans in Algeria stood at 109,380. From the late 19th century through the early 20th century, a colonial society began to emerge in French Algeria, composed of European settlers mainly from France, Italy, Spain, and Malta. Historian Emmanuel Sivan notes that "the turn of the century saw the fusion of numerous immigrant European ethnicities into one pied noir community." Colonial observers identified this fusion as "a new race" caused by extensive European mixing exhibiting a melting pot effect. This was supported by the fact that most European settlers were born in Algeria rather than Europe, alongside an equalization of the human sex ratio. However, this system largely excluded the native population, with intermarriage between Europeans and native Algerians remaining negligible.

Algeria served as a safe haven for Europeans escaping authoritarian regimes, notably Spaniards fleeing after the 1936 siege of Madrid during the Spanish Civil War. It also became a site for deporting undesirables, such as the 6,200 republicans exiled in 1852 following the 1851 self-coup staged by Napoleon III, and the expulsion of Communards from Paris in 1870 following the Franco-Prussian War. By 1962, Algeria contained a large European population of 1.6 million who constituted 15.2% of the total population.

=== Languages ===
During colonial rule, the French language was imposed as the official language and the language of instruction in schools, while Arabic was reduced to foreign status.

In 1834, a French general in Algeria observed that "nearly all the Arabs can read and write; in each village there are two schools." Consequently, since the conquest in 1830, the French built colonial schools to assert linguistic dominance. The governor-general of Algeria in 1832–1833 articulated the schools' purpose as to "gradually replace Arabic by French." According to the 1906 census, out of a native population of 4.5 million, there were 1,305,730 speakers of Berber languages, or 29% of the population.

=== Graph ===
Algeria's population under the French
→ after 1962

Year	Pop.	±% p.a.
1830	3,000,000	—
1851	2,554,100	−0.76%
1856	2,496,100	−0.46%
1862	2,999,100	+3.11%
1866	2,921,200	−0.66%
1872	2,894,500	−0.15%
1877	2,867,600	−0.19%
1882	3,310,400	+2.91%
1886	3,867,000	+3.96%
1892	4,174,700	+1.28%
1896	4,479,000	+1.77%

Year	Pop.	±% p.a.
1900	4,675,000	+1.08%
1901	4,739,300	+1.38%
1906	5,231,900	+2.00%
1911	5,563,800	+1.24%
1921	5,804,300	+0.42%
1930^{e}	6,453,000	+1.18%
1940^{e}	7,614,000	+1.67%
1947	8,302,000	+1.24%
1948	8,681,800	+4.57%
1949	8,602,000	−0.92%
1950	8,753,000	+1.76%

Year	Pop.	±% p.a.
1951	8,927,000	+1.99%
1952	9,126,000	+2.23%
1953	9,370,000	+2.67%
1954	9,529,700	+1.70%
1955	9,678,000	+1.56%
1956	9,903,000	+2.32%
1958	10,127,000	+1.12%
1959	10,575,000	+4.42%
1960	10,853,000	+2.63%
1962	10,920,000	+0.31%

^{e} – Indicates that this is an estimated figure.

View source data.
View source data.
View source data.

== Economics ==
Algeria was usually France's largest trading partner and the two were highly dependent on each other; especially Algeria. In 1953 Algeria received 37% of French exports and 25% of its imports. Algeria at the eve of independence had a small manufacturing base and most of its agricultural exports to France did not have much use for the French because of their already large agricultural production. Oil was discovered in the Sahara parts of Algeria in 1956.

=== Transportation ===
A railroad network was built to connect coastal cities to each other along with other towns in the mountainous north which were not on the coast. The railroad network was eventually connected to the railroad network of neighbouring Tunisia and Morocco. Algeria had 1,750 kilometres (1,090 mi) of railroads and by 1884 there was approximately 6,600 kilometres (4,100 mi) making up around 30% of Africa's railroad network in 1884.

At the time of Algeria's independence there was approximately 7,000 miles (11,000 km) of "national paved highways".

== French rule ==
=== French atrocities against the Algerian indigenous population ===
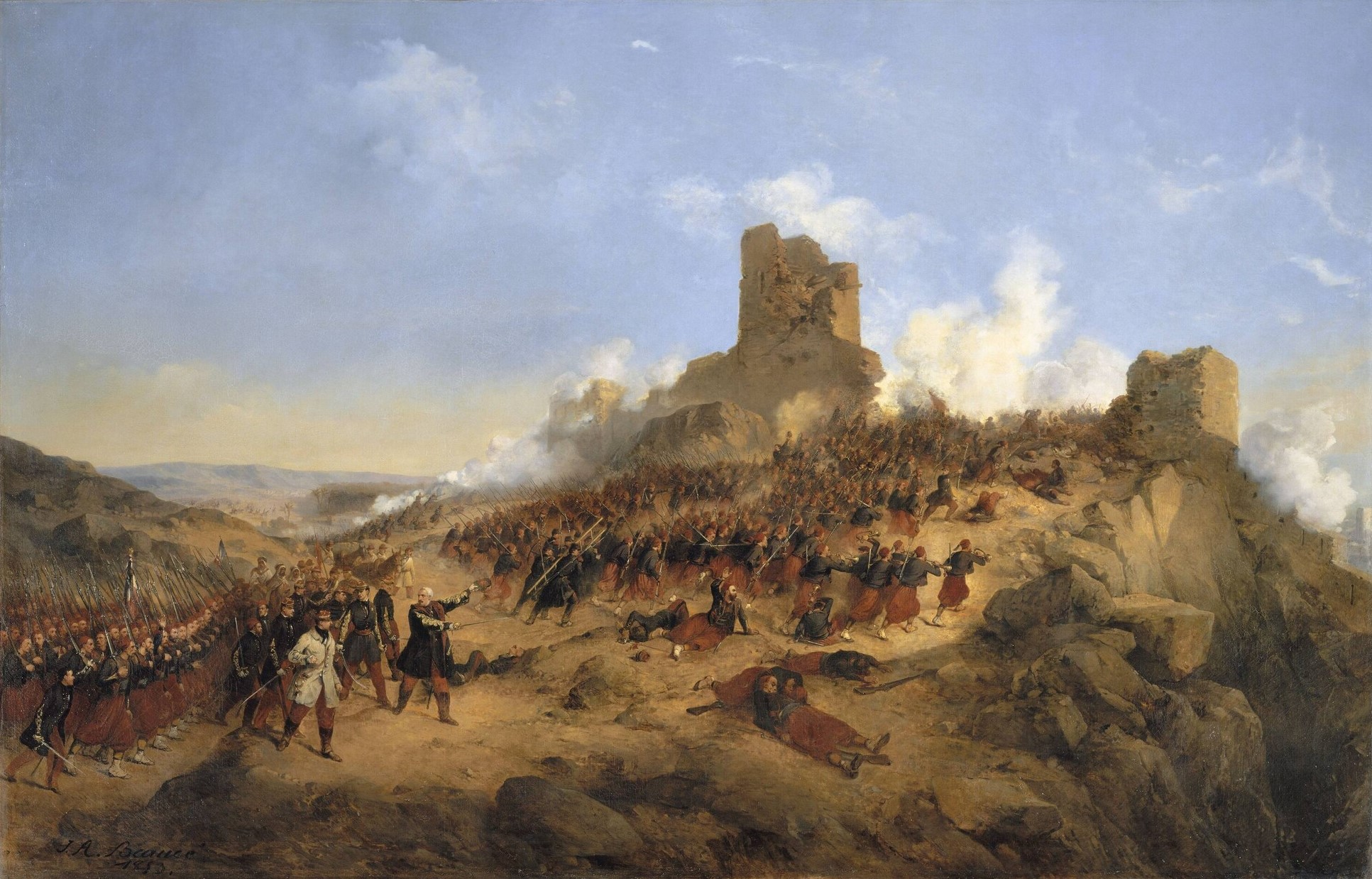
The siege of Laghouat (1852) during the Pacification of Algeria.

According to Ben Kiernan, French colonization and genocidal massacres proceeded in tandem. Between 1830 and 1875, Algeria's population fell by up to a third due to disease, starvation, war and massacres, with between 500,000 and 1,000,000 Algerians killed out of a total population of 3 million. During this period, the French destroyed mosques and other Islamic buildings and converted them into Catholic Churches. Atrocities committed by the French during the Algerian War during the 1950s against Algerians include deliberate bombing and killing of unarmed civilians, the use of napalm to indiscriminately burn villages, rape, torture, executions through "death flights" or burial alive, thefts and pillaging. Up to 2 million Algerian civilians were also deported in internment camps.

During the Pacification of Algeria (1835–1903) French forces engaged in a scorched earth policy against the Algerian population. Colonel Lucien de Montagnac stated that the purpose of the pacification was to "destroy everything that will not crawl beneath our feet like dogs." The scorched earth policy, decided by Governor General Thomas Robert Bugeaud, had devastating effects on the socio-economic and food balances of the country: "we fire little gunshot, we burn all douars, all villages, all huts; the enemy flees across taking his flock." According to Olivier Le Cour Grandmaison, the colonization of Algeria led to the extermination of a third of the population from multiple causes (massacres, deportations, famines or epidemics) that were all interrelated. Returning from an investigation trip to Algeria, Tocqueville wrote that "we make war much more barbaric than the Arabs themselves [...] it is for their part that civilization is situated."

French forces deported and banished entire Algerian tribes. The Moorish families of Tlemcen were exiled to the Orient, and others were emigrated elsewhere. The tribes that were considered too troublesome were banned, and some took refuge in Tunisia, Morocco and Syria or were deported to New Caledonia or Guyana. Also, French forces also engaged in wholesale massacres of entire tribes. All 500 men, women and children of the El Oufia tribe were killed in one night, while all 500 to 700 members of the Ouled Rhia tribe were killed by suffocation in a cave. The Siege of Laghouat is referred by Algerians as the year of the "Khalya ," Arabic for emptiness, which is commonly known to the inhabitants of Laghouat as the year that the city was emptied of its population. It is also commonly known as the year of Hessian sacks, referring to the way the captured surviving men and boys were put alive in the hessian sacks and thrown into dug-up trenches.

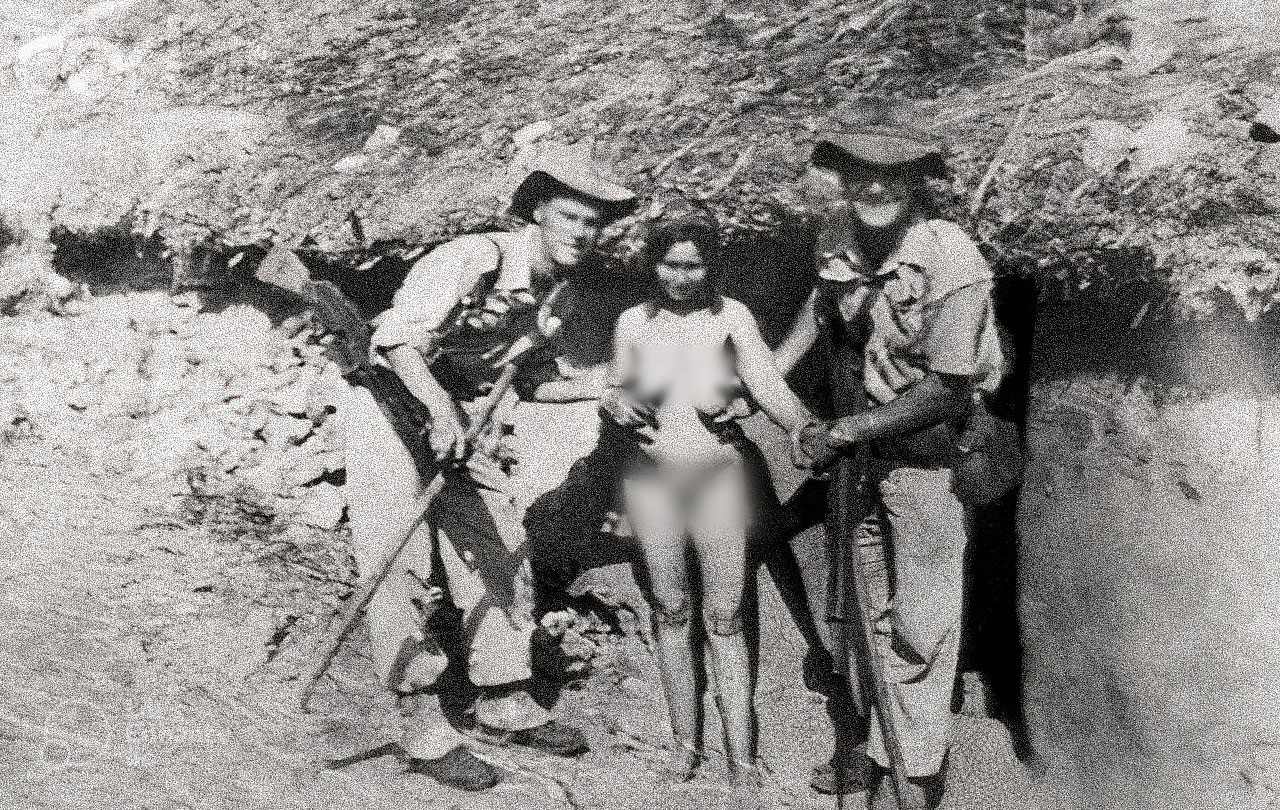
Algerian woman sexually abused by the French army

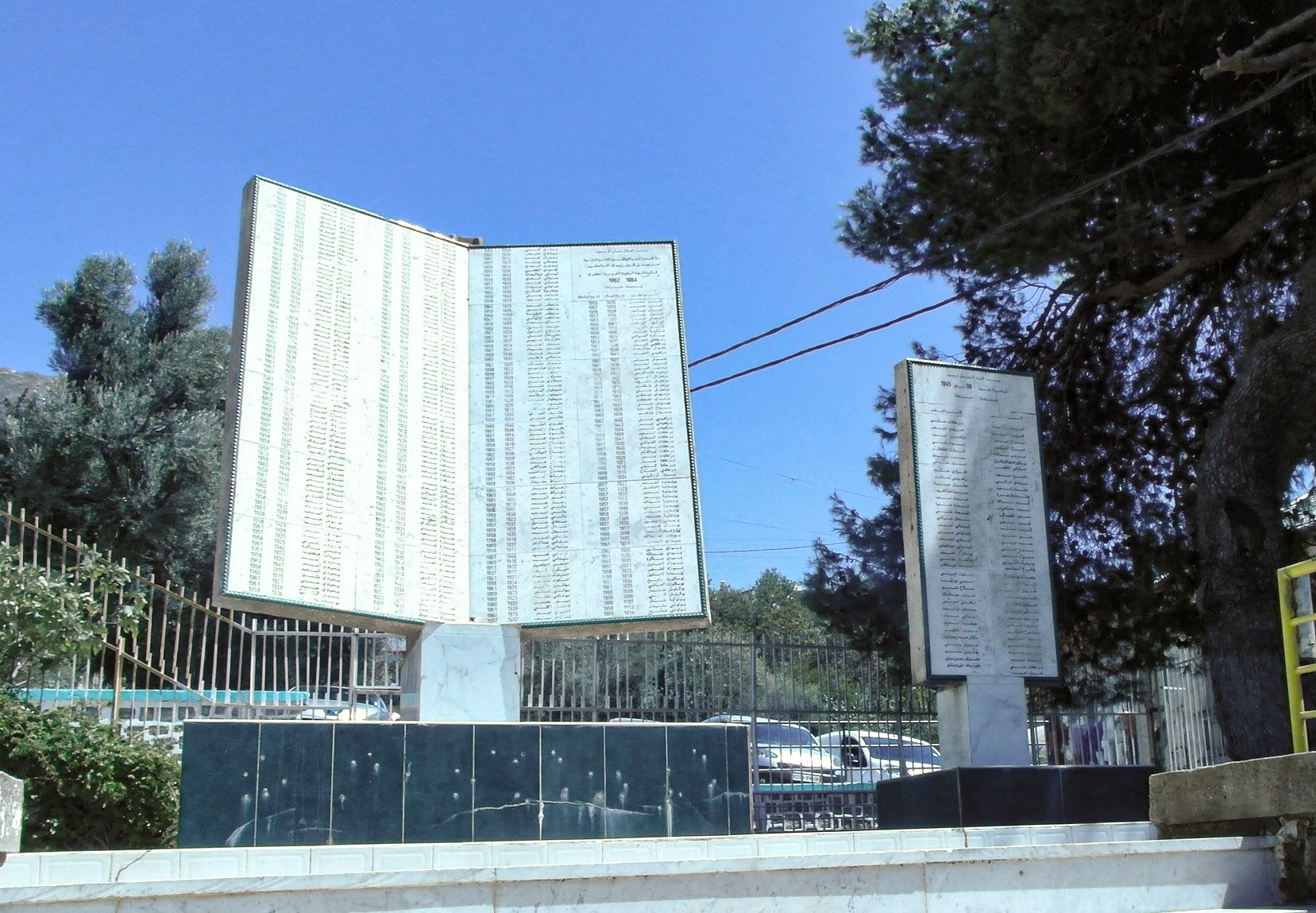
Monument to the victims of the Sétif and Guelma massacre, Kherrata

From 8 May to June 26, 1945, the French carried out the Sétif and Guelma massacre, in which between 6,000 and 80,000 Algerian Muslims were killed. Its initial outbreak occurred during a parade of about 5,000 people of the Muslim Algerian population of Sétif to celebrate the surrender of Nazi Germany in World War II; it ended in clashes between the marchers and the local French gendarmerie, when the latter tried to seize banners attacking colonial rule. After five days, the French colonial military and police suppressed the rebellion, and then carried out a series of reprisals against Muslim civilians. The army carried out summary executions of Muslim rural communities. Less accessible villages were bombed by French aircraft, and cruiser Duguay-Trouin, standing off the coast in the Gulf of Bougie, shelled Kherrata. Vigilantes lynched prisoners taken from local jails or randomly shot Muslims not wearing white arm bands (as instructed by the army) out of hand. It is certain that the great majority of the Muslim victims had not been implicated in the original outbreak. The dead bodies in Guelma were buried in mass graves, but they were later dug up and burned in Héliopolis.

During the Algerian War (1954–1962), the French used deliberate illegal methods against the Algerians, including (as described by Henri Alleg, who himself had been tortured, and historians such as Raphaëlle Branche) beatings, torture by electroshock, waterboarding, burns, and rape. Prisoners were also locked up without food in small cells, buried alive, and thrown from helicopters to their death or into the sea with concrete on their feet. Claude Bourdet had denounced these acts on 6 December 1951, in the magazine L'Observateur, rhetorically asking, "Is there a Gestapo in Algeria? ." D. Huf, in his seminal work on the subject, argued that the use of torture was one of the major factors in developing French opposition to the war. Huf argued, "Such tactics sat uncomfortably with France's revolutionary history, and brought unbearable comparisons with Nazi Germany. The French national psyche would not tolerate any parallels between their experiences of occupation and their colonial mastery of Algeria." General Paul Aussaresses admitted in 2000 that systematic torture techniques were used during the war and justified it. He also recognized the assassination of lawyer Ali Boumendjel and the head of the FLN in Algiers, Larbi Ben M'Hidi, which had been disguised as suicides. Bigeard, who called FLN activists "savages," claimed torture was a "necessary evil." To the contrary, General Jacques Massu denounced it, following Aussaresses's revelations and, before his death, pronounced himself in favor of an official condemnation of the use of torture during the war. In June 2000, Bigeard declared that he was based in Sidi Ferruch, a torture center where Algerians were murdered. Bigeard qualified Louisette Ighilahriz's revelations, published in the Le Monde newspaper on June 20, 2000, as "lies." An ALN activist, Louisette Ighilahriz had been tortured by General Massu. However, since General Massu's revelations, Bigeard has admitted the use of torture, although he denies having personally used it, and has declared, "You are striking the heart of an 84-year-old man." Bigeard also recognized that Larbi Ben M'Hidi was assassinated and that his death was disguised as a suicide.

It is also estimated that between 27,000 and 60,000 Algerians were affected by radiation from French nuclear weapons tests in the Algerian Desert, with thousands having long-lasting health effects and deformities due to radiation exposure. The French Ministry of Defence states that 27,000 people were affected, including French military forces and technicians. Experts who have studied the effects of the tests estimate that over 42,000 Algerians were affected. Abdul Kadhim al-Aboudi, professor of nuclear physics at the University of Oran, estimated that 60,000 people were affected.

In 2018 France officially admitted that torture was systematic and routine.

In October 2021, the office of Algerian president Abdelmadjid Tebboune stated that 5.6 million Algerians died during French colonial rule. According to The New Arab, the historian Mohammed Al-Amin estimates that the total Algerian death toll during the 132 years of French colonial occupation could be as high as 10 million.

=== Hegemony of the colons ===
==== Political organization ====
A commission of inquiry established by the French Senate in 1892 and headed by former Prime Minister Jules Ferry, an advocate of colonial expansion, recommended that the government abandon a policy that assumed French law, without major modifications, could fit the needs of an area inhabited by close to two million Europeans and four million Muslims. Muslims had no representation in the French National Assembly before 1945 and were grossly under-represented on local councils. Because of the many restrictions imposed by the authorities, by 1915 only 50,000 Muslims were eligible to vote in elections in the civil communes. Attempts to implement even the most modest reforms were blocked or delayed by the local administration in Algeria, dominated by colons, and by the 27 colon representatives in the National Assembly (six deputies and three senators from each department).

Once elected to the National Assembly, colons became permanent fixtures. Because of their seniority, they exercised disproportionate influence, and their support was important to any government's survival. The leader of the colon delegation, Auguste Warnier (1810–1875), succeeded during the 1870s in modifying or introducing legislation to facilitate the private transfer of land to settlers and continue the Algerian state's appropriation of land from the local population and distribution to settlers. Consistent proponents of reform, like Georges Clemenceau and socialist Jean Jaurès, were rare in the National Assembly.

Between 1860 and 1870, Napoleon III planned to establish an Arab kingdom in Algeria, with the goal of taking Algeria out of legal limbo and making it a client kingdom which he would rule in a personal union. However, his project was abandoned by the Third Republic.

==== Economic organization ====
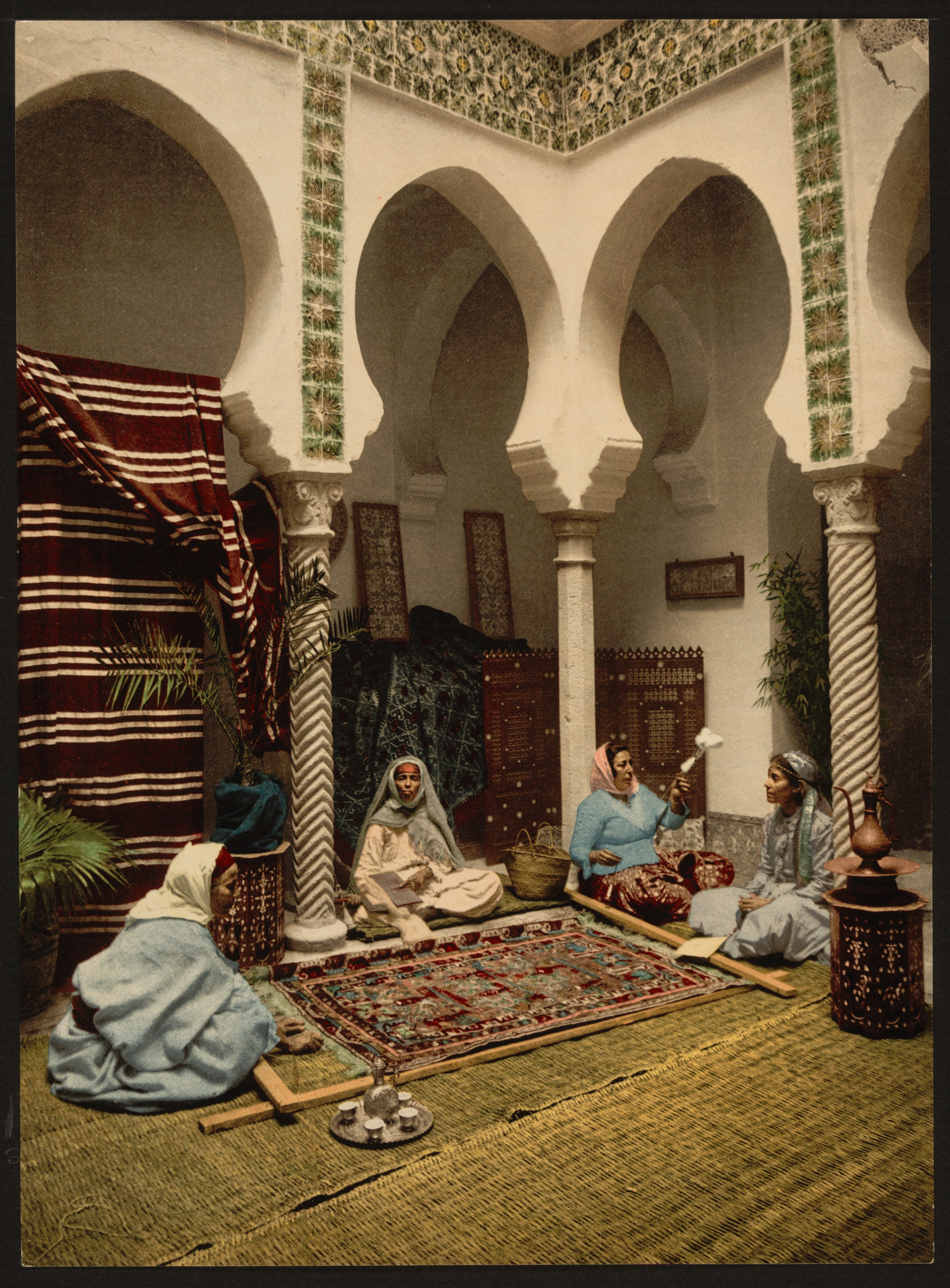
Moorish women making Arab carpets, Algiers, 1899

The bulk of Algeria's wealth in manufacturing, mining, agriculture, and trade was controlled by the grands colons. The modern European-owned and -managed sector of the economy centered on small industry and a highly developed export trade, designed to provide food and raw materials to France in return for capital and consumer goods. Europeans held about 30% of the total arable land, including the bulk of the most fertile land and most of the areas under irrigation. By 1900, Europeans produced more than two-thirds of the value of output in agriculture and practically all agricultural exports. The modern, or European, sector was run on a commercial basis and meshed with the French market system that it supplied with wine, citrus, olives, and vegetables. Nearly half of the value of European-owned real property was in vineyards by 1914. By contrast, subsistence cereal production—supplemented by olive, fig, and date growing and stock raising—formed the basis of the traditional sector, but the land available for cropping was submarginal even for cereals under prevailing traditional cultivation practices.

In 1953, sixty per cent of the Muslim rural population were officially classed as being destitute. The European community, numbering at the time about one million out of a total population of nine million, owned about 66% of farmable land and produced all of the 1.3 million tons of wine that provided the base of the Algerian economy. Exports of Algerian wine and wheat to France were balanced in trading terms by a flow of manufactured goods.

The colonial regime imposed more and higher taxes on Muslims than on Europeans. The Muslims, in addition to paying traditional taxes dating from before the French conquest, also paid new taxes, from which the colons were normally exempted. In 1909, for instance, Muslims, who made up almost 90% of the population but produced 20% of Algeria's income, paid 70% of direct taxes and 45% of the total taxes collected. And colons controlled how these revenues would be spent. As a result, colon towns had handsome municipal buildings, paved streets lined with trees, fountains and statues, while Algerian villages and rural areas benefited little if at all from tax revenues.

In financial terms Algeria was a drain on the French tax-payer. In the early 1950s the total Algerian budget of seventy-two billion francs included a direct subsidy of twenty-eight billion contributed from the metropolitan budget. Described at the time as being a French luxury, continued rule from Paris was justified on a variety of grounds including historic sentiment, strategic value and the political influence of the European settler population.

==== Schools ====
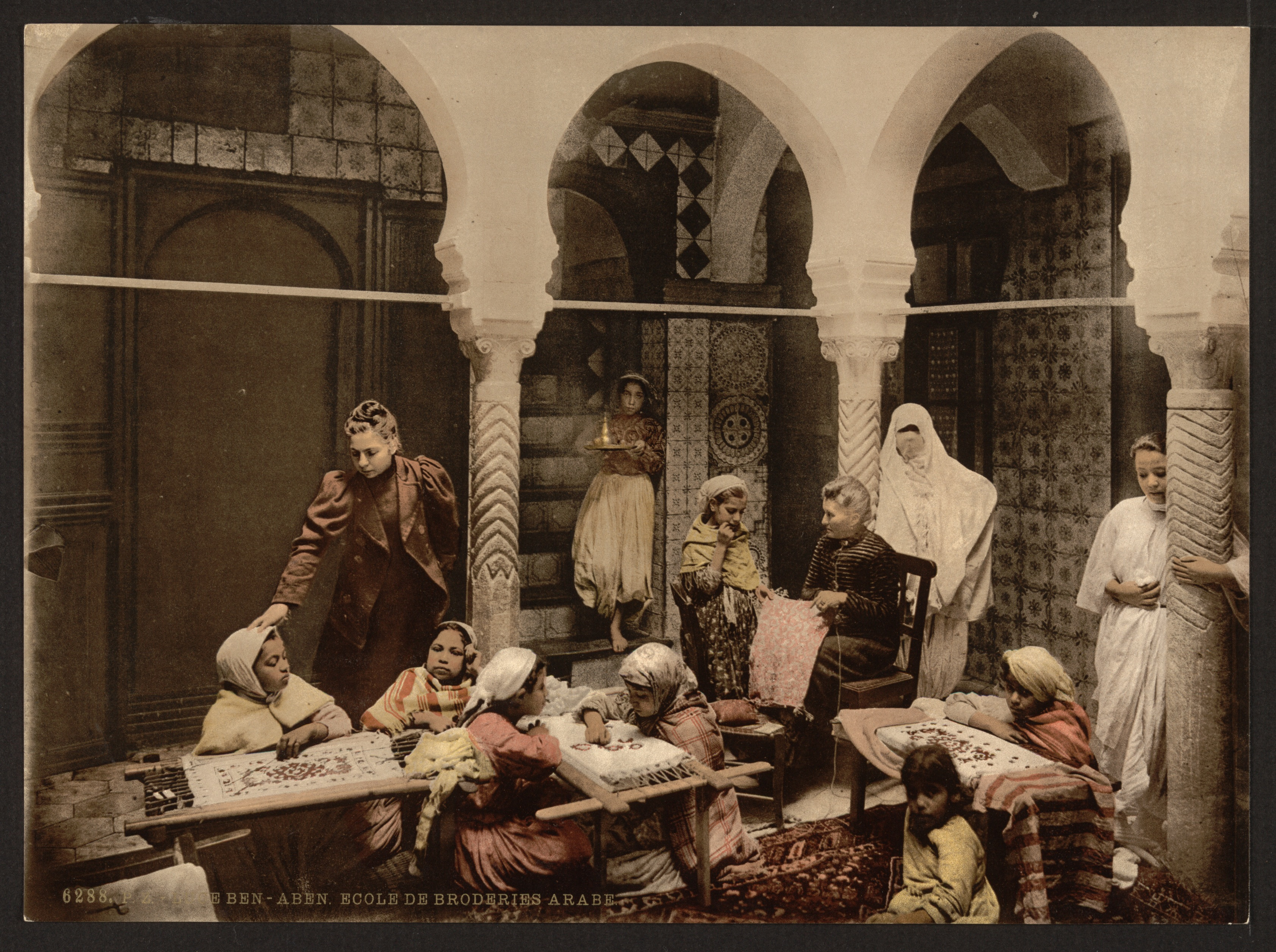
Arab school of embroidery, Algiers, 1899

The colonial regime proved severely detrimental to overall education for Algerian Muslims, who had previously relied on religious schools to learn reading and writing and engage in religious studies. Not only did the state appropriate the habus lands (the religious foundations that constituted the main source of income for religious institutions, including schools) in 1843, but colon officials refused to allocate enough money to maintain schools and mosques properly and to provide for enough teachers and religious leaders for the growing population. In 1892, more than five times as much was spent for the education of Europeans as for Muslims, who had five times as many children of school age. Because few Muslim teachers were trained, Muslim schools were largely staffed by French teachers. Even a state-operated madrasah (school) often had French faculty members. Attempts to institute bilingual, bicultural schools, intended to bring Muslim and European children together in the classroom, were a conspicuous failure, rejected by both communities and phased out after 1870. According to one estimate, fewer than 5% of Algerian children attended any kind of school in 1870. As late as 1954 only one Muslim boy in five and one girl in sixteen was receiving formal schooling. The level of literacy amongst the total Muslim population was estimated at only 2% in urban areas and half of that figure in the rural hinterland.

Efforts were begun by 1890 to educate a small number of Muslims along with European students in the French school system as part of France's "civilizing mission" in Algeria. The curriculum was entirely French and allowed no place for Arabic studies, which were deliberately downgraded even in Muslim schools. Within a generation, a class of well-educated, gallicized Muslims – the évolués (literally, the evolved ones)—had been created. Almost all of the handful of Muslims who accepted French citizenship were évolués; ironically, this privileged group of Muslims, strongly influenced by French culture and political attitudes, developed a new Algerian self-consciousness.

==== Relationships between the colons, Indigènes and France ====
Reporting to the French Senate in 1894, Governor-General Jules Cambon wrote that Algeria had "only a dust of people left her." He referred to the destruction of the traditional ruling class that had left Muslims without leaders and had deprived France of interlocuteurs valables (literally, valid go-betweens), through whom to reach the masses of the people. He lamented that no genuine communication was possible between the two communities.

The colons who ran Algeria maintained a dialog only with the beni-oui-ouis. Later they thwarted contact between the évolués and Muslim traditionalists on the one hand and between évolués and official circles in France on the other. They feared and mistrusted the Francophone évolués, who were classified either as assimilationist, insisting on being accepted as Frenchmen but on their own terms, or as integrationists, eager to work as members of a distinct Muslim elite on equal terms with the French.

=== Separate personal status ===
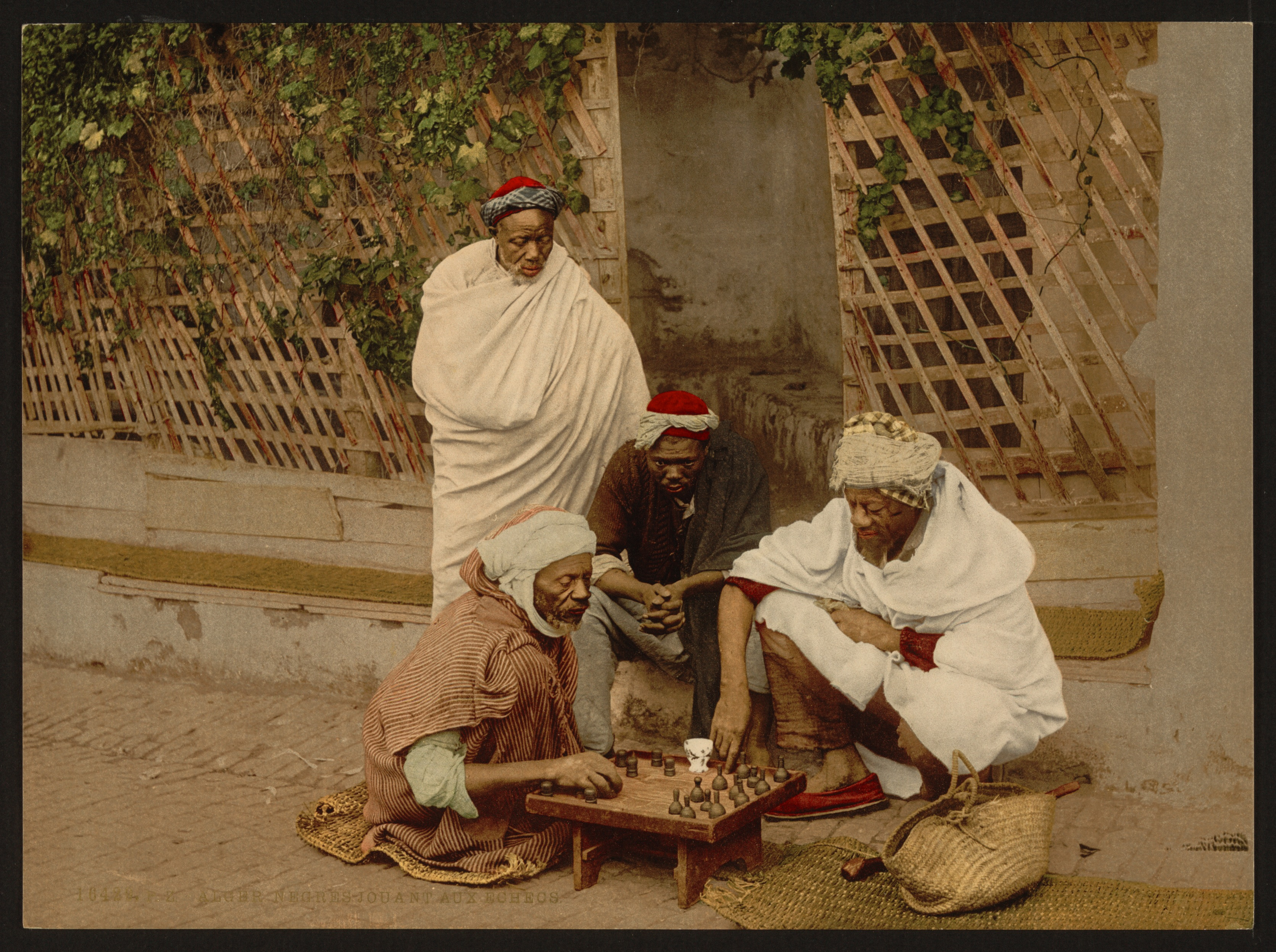
Algerians playing chess, Algiers, 1899

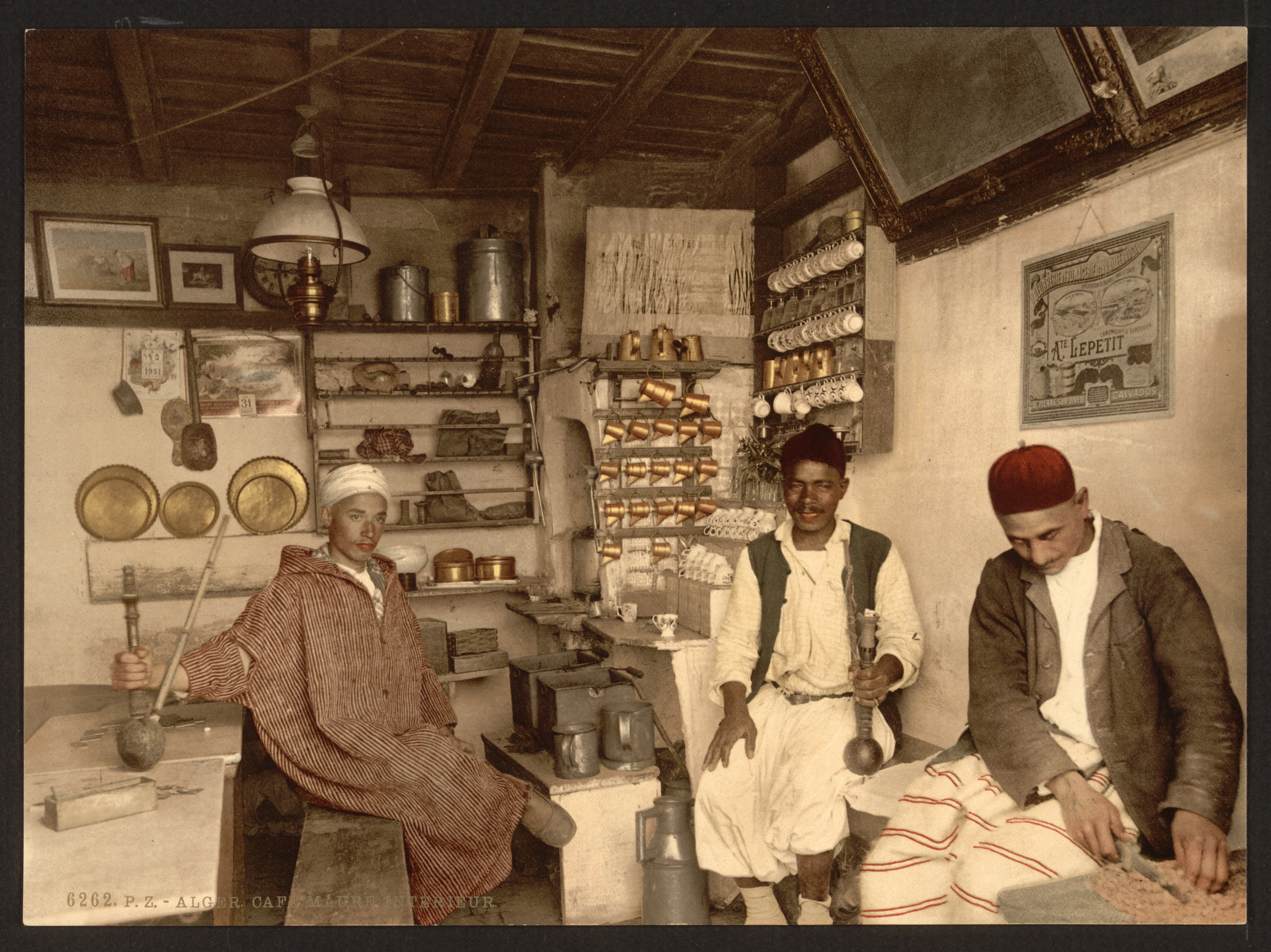
Moorish coffee house, Algiers, 1899

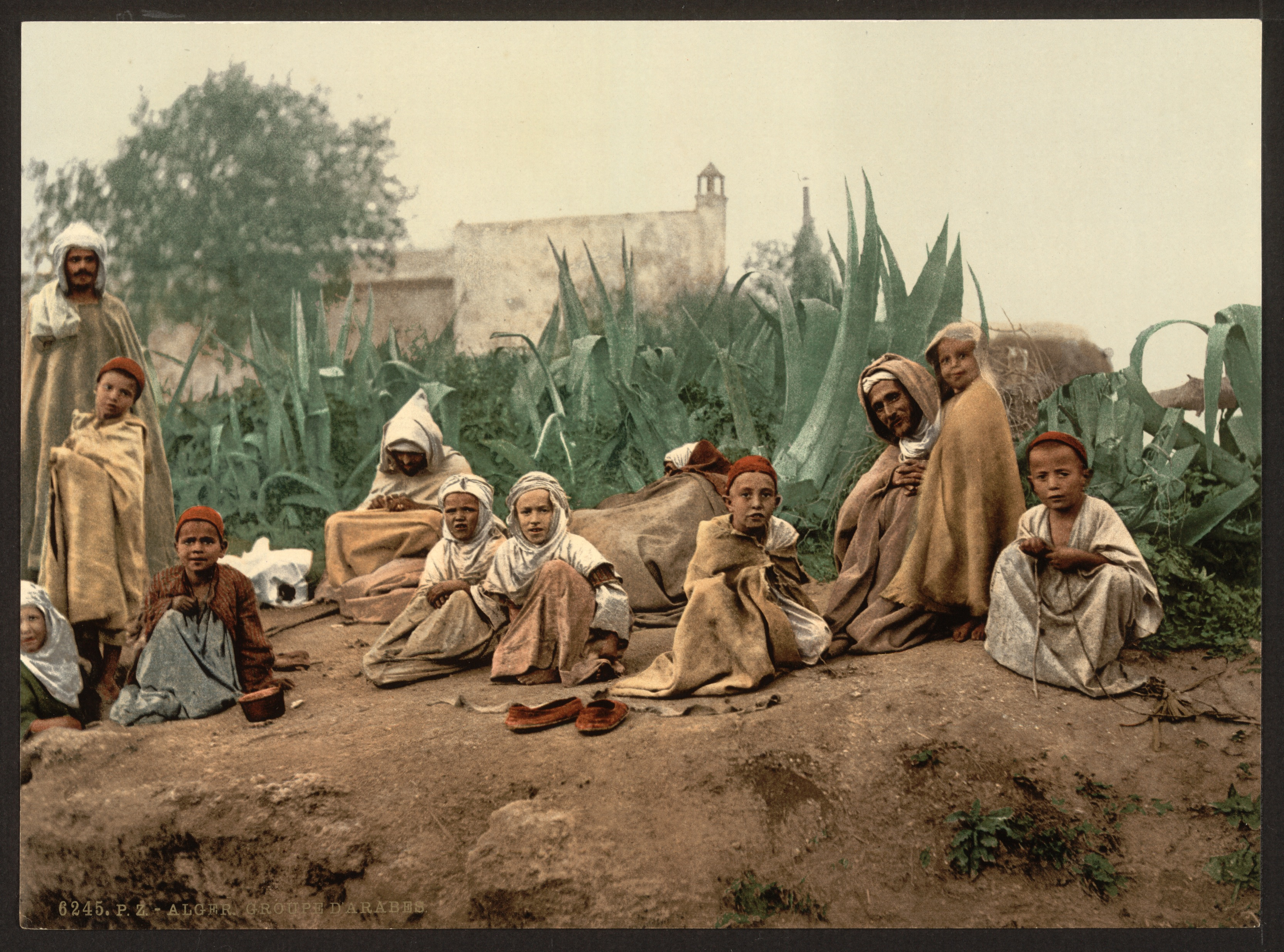
Group of Arabs, Algiers, 1899

Two communities existed: the French national and the people living with their own traditions. Following its conquest of Ottoman-controlled Algeria in 1830, for well over a century, France maintained what was effectively colonial rule in the territory, though the French Constitution of 1848 made Algeria part of France, and Algeria was usually understood as such by French people, even on the Left. Algeria became the prototype for a pattern of French colonial rule.

With nine million or so Muslim Algerians "dominated" by one million settlers, Algeria had similarities with South Africa, that has later been described as "quasi-apartheid" while the concept of apartheid was formalized in 1948.

This personal status lasted the entire time Algeria was French, from 1830 till 1962, with various changes in the meantime.

When French rule began, France had no well-established systems for intensive colonial governance, the main existing legal provision being the 1685 Code Noir which was related to slave-trading and owning and incompatible with the legal context of Algeria. Indeed, France was committed in respecting the local law.

==== Status before 1865 ====
On 5 July 1830, Hussein Dey, regent of Algiers, signed the act of capitulation to the Régence, which committed General de Bourmont and France "not to infringe on the freedom of people of all classes and their religion ." Muslims still remain submitted to the Muslim Customary law and Jews to the Law of Moses; all of them remained linked to the Ottoman Empire.

That same year and the same month, the July Revolution ended the Bourbon Restoration and began the July Monarchy in which Louis Philippe I was King of the French.

The royal "Ordonnance du 22 juillet 1834" organized general government and administration of the French territories in North Africa and is usually considered as an effective annexation of Algeria by France; the annexation made all people legally linked to France and broke the legal link between people and the Ottoman Empire, because International law made annexation systematically induce a régnicole. This made people living in Algeria "French subjects ," without providing them any way to become French nationals. However, since it was not positive law, this text did not introduce legal certainty on this topic. This was confirmed by the French Constitution of 1848

As French rule in Algeria expanded, particularly under Thomas-Robert Bugeaud (1841–48), discriminatory governance became increasingly formalised. In 1844, Bugeaud formalised a system of European settlements along the coast, under civil government, with Arab/Berber areas in the interior under military governance. An important feature of French rule was cantonnement, whereby tribal land that was supposedly unused was seized by the state, which enabled French colonists to expand their landholdings, and pushed indigenous people onto more marginal land and made them more vulnerable to drought; this was extended under the governance of Bugeaud's successor, Jacques Louis Randon.

A case in 1861 questioned the legal status of people in Algeria. On 28 November 1861, the conseil de l'ordre des avocats du barreau d'Alger (Bar association of Algiers) declined to recognise Élie Énos (or Aïnos), a Jew from Algiers, since only French citizens could become lawyers. On 24 February 1862 (appeal) and on 15 February 1864 (cassation), judges reconsidered this, deciding that people could display the qualities of being French (without having access to the full rights of a French citizen).

==== Status since 1865 ====
Napoleon III was the first elected president of the French Second Republic before becoming Emperor of the French by the 1852 French Second Empire referendum after the French coup d'état of 1851. In the 1860s, influenced by Ismael Urbain, he introduced what were intended as liberalizing reforms in Algeria, promoting the French colonial model of assimilation, whereby colonised peoples would eventually become French. His reforms were resisted by colonists in Algeria, and his attempts to allow Muslims to be elected to a putative new assembly in Paris failed.

However, he oversaw an 1865 decree (sénatus-consulte du 14 juillet 1865 sur l'état des personnes et la naturalisation en Algérie) that "stipulated that all the colonised indigenous were under French jurisdiction, i.e., French nationals subjected to French laws ," and allowed Arab, Jewish, and Berber Algerians to request French citizenship—but only if they "renounced their Muslim religion and culture ."

This was the first time indigènes (natives) were allowed to access French citizenship, but such citizenship was incompatible with the statut personnel, which allowed them to live within the Muslim traditions.

- Flandin argued that French citizenship was not compatible with Muslim status, since it had opposing laws on marriage, repudiation, divorce, and children's legal status.
- Claude Alphonse Delangle, senator, also argued that Muslim and Jewish religions allowed polygamy, repudiation, and divorce.

Later, Azzedine Haddour argued that this decree established "the formal structures of a political apartheid ." Since few people were willing to abandon their religious values (which was seen as apostasy), rather than promoting assimilation, the legislation had the opposite effect: by 1913, only 1,557 Muslims had been granted French citizenship.

Special penalties were managed by the cadis or tribe head but because this system was unfair it was decided by a Circulaire on 12 February 1844 to take control of those specific fines. Those fines were defined by various prefectural decrees, and were later known as the Code de l'indigénat. Lack of codification means that there is no complete text summary of these fines available.

On 28 July 1881, a new law (loi qui confère aux Administrateurs des communes mixtes en territoire civil la répression, par voie disciplinaire, des infractions spéciales à l'indigénat) known as the Code de l'indigénat was formally introduced for seven years to help administration. It enabled district officials to issue summary fines to Muslims without due legal process, and to extract special taxes. This temporary law was renewed by other temporary laws: the laws of 27 June 1888 for two years, 25 June 1890, 25 June 1897, 21 December 1904, 24 December 1907, 5 July 1914, 4 August 1920, 11 July 1922 and 30 December 1922. By 1897, fines could be changed into forced labor.

Periodic attempts at partial reform failed:

- In 1881, Paul Leroy-Beaulieu created the Société française pour la protection des Indigènes des colonies (French society for the protection of natives) to give indigènes the right of vote.
- In 1887, Henri Michelin and Alfred Gaulier proposed the naturalisation of the indigènes, keeping the personal status from the local law but removing the personal status of common right from the Civil Code.
- In 1890, Alfred Martineau proposed a progressive French naturalisation of all Muslim indigènes living in Algeria.
- In 1911, La revue indigène published several articles signed by law professors (André Weiss, Arthur Giraud, Charles de Boeck and Eugène Audinet) advocating naturalization of the indigènes with their status.
- In 1912, the Jeunes Algériens movement claimed in its Manifeste that the naturalization with their status and with conditions of the Algerian indigènes.

In 1909, 70% of all direct taxes in Algeria were paid by Muslims, despite their general poverty.

Opportunities for Muslims improved slightly from the 1890s, particularly for urban elites, which helped ensure acquiescence to the introduction of military conscription for Muslims in 1911.

Napoléon III received a petition signed by more than 10,000 local Jews asking for collective access to French citizenship. This was also the desire, between 1865 and 1869, of the Conseils généraux des départements algériens. The Jews were the main part of the population that desired French citizenship.

Under the French Third Republic, on 24 October 1870, based on a project from the Second French Empire, Adolphe Crémieux, founder and president of the Alliance israélite universelle and minister of Justice of the Government of National Defense defined with Mac Mahon's agreement a series of seven decrees related to Algeria, the most notable being number 136 known as the Crémieux Decree which granted French citizenship to Algerian indigenous Jews. A different decree, numbered 137, related to Muslims and foreigners and required 21 years of age to ask for French citizenship.

In 1870, the French government granted Algerian Jews French citizenship under the Crémieux Decree, but not Muslims. This meant that most Algerians were still 'French subjects', treated as the objects of French law, but were still not citizens, could still not vote, and were effectively without the right to citizenship.

In 1919, after the involvement of 172,019 Algerians in the First World War, the Jonnart Law eased access to French citizenship for those who met one of several criteria, such as working for the French army, a son in a war, knowing how to read and write in the French language, having a public position, being married to or born of an indigène who became a French citizen. Half a million Algerians were exempted from the indigénat status, and this status became void in 1927 in the mixed towns but remained applicable in other towns until its abrogation in 1944.

Later, Jewish people's citizenship was revoked by the Vichy government in the early 1940s, but was restored in 1943.

==== Muslim French ====
Despite periodic attempts at partial reform, the situation of the Code de l'indigénat persisted until the French Fourth Republic, which formally began in 1946.

On 7 March 1944 ordonnance ended the Code de l'indigénat and created a second electoral college for 1,210,000 non-citizen Muslims and made 60,000 Muslims French citizen and with a vote in the first electoral college. The 17 August 1945 ordonnance gave each of the two colleges 15 MPs and 7 senators. On 7 May 1946, the Loi Lamine Guèye gave French citizenship to every overseas national, including Algerians, giving them a right to vote at 21 years old. The French Constitution of the Fourth Republic conceptualized the dissociation of citizenship and personal status (but no legal text implements this dissociation).

Although Muslim Algerians were accorded the rights of citizenship, the system of discrimination was maintained in more informal ways. Frederick Cooper writes that Muslim Algerians "were still marginalized in their own territory, notably the separate voter roles of "French" civil status and of "Muslim" civil status, to keep their hands on power."

In the specific context following the second war, in 1947 is introduced the 1947 statute which granted a local status citizenship to the indigènes who became "Muslim French" (Français musulmans), while other French were Français non-musulmans remain civil status citizens The rights differences are no longer implied by a status difference, but by the difference between the two territories, Algerian and French.

This system is rejected by some European for introducing Muslims into the European college, and rejected by some Algerian nationalists for not giving full sovereignty to the Algerian nation.

This "internal system of apartheid" met with considerable resistance from the Muslims affected by it, and is cited as one of the causes of the 1954 insurrection.

==== Algerian citizens ====
On 18 March 1962, the Évian Accords guaranteed protection, non-discrimination and property rights for all Algerian citizens and the right of self-determination to Algeria. In France it was approved by the 1962 French Évian Accords referendum.

The agreement addressed various statuses:

- Algerian civil rights
- Rights and freedoms of Algerian citizens of ordinary civil status
- French nationals residing in Algeria as aliens.

The Évian Accords offered French nationals Algerian civil rights for three years, but required them to apply for Algerian nationality. The agreement stated that during this three-year period:

They will receive guarantees appropriate to their cultural, linguistic and religious characteristics. They will retain their personal status, which will be respected and enforced by Algerian courts composed of judges of the same status. They will use the French language within the assemblies and in their relations with the constituted authorities.

— Évian Accords.

The European French community (the colon population), the pieds-noirs and indigenous Sephardi Jews in Algeria were guaranteed religious freedom and property rights as well as French citizenship with the option to choose between French and Algerian citizenship after three years. Algerians were permitted to continue freely circulating between their country and France for work, although they would not have political rights equal to French citizens.

The OAS right-wing movement opposed this agreement.

== Government and administration ==
=== Initial settling of Algeria (1830–48) ===
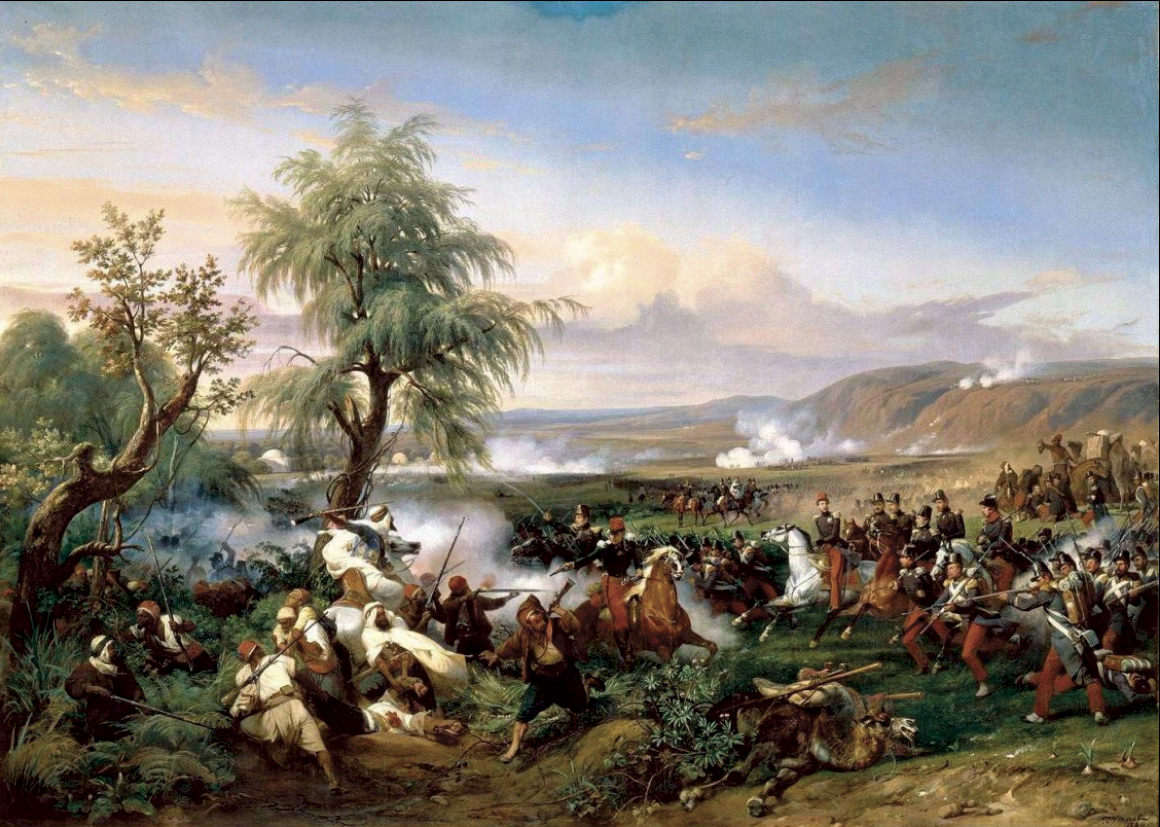
The French conquest of Algeria

In November 1830, French colonial officials attempted to limit the arrivals at Algerian ports by requiring the presentation of passports and residence permits. The regulations created by the French government in May 1831 required permission from the Interior Ministry to enter Algeria and other French controlled territories.

By 1839, there were 25,000 Europeans living in Algeria, while only just less than half of these being French; the others being Spanish, Italian and Germans. And of these, the majority of them stayed within the coastal towns. These recent arrivals were mostly men, outnumbering women by five times. Of the minority that ventured into the countryside were soldier-settlers that were provided land concessions by the French government while Cistercian monks built monasteries and farms.

This allowed merchants with trading interests easy access to passports because they were not permanent settlers, and wealthy persons who planned to found agricultural enterprises in Algeria were also freely given access to move. The circular forbade passage to indigents and needy unskilled workers. During the 1840s, the French government assisted certain emigrants to Algeria, who were mostly urban workers from the Paris basin and France's eastern frontier and were not the agricultural workers that the colonial officials wanted to be sent from France. Single men received 68 percent of the free passages and only 14 percent of the emigrants were women because of varying policies about the emigration of families that all favored unaccompanied males who were seen as more flexible and useful for laborious tasks. Initially in November 1840, families were eligible only if they had no small children and two-thirds of the family was able to work.

Later, in September 1841, only unaccompanied males could travel to Algeria for free and a complicated system for families was developed that made subsidized travel almost unavailable. These emigrants were offered many different forms of government assistance including free passage (both to the ports of France and by ship to Algeria), wine rations and food, land concessions, and were promised high wages. Between 1841 and 1845, about 20,000 individuals were offered this assisted emigration by the French government, though it is unknown exactly how many actually went to Algeria. These measures were funded and supported by the French government (both local and national) because they saw the move to Algeria as a solution to overpopulation and unemployment; those who applied for assisted emigration emphasized their work ethic, undeserved employment in France, a presumption of government obligation to the less fortunate. By 1848, Algeria was populated by 109,400 Europeans, only 42,274 of whom were French.

=== Colonisation and military control ===
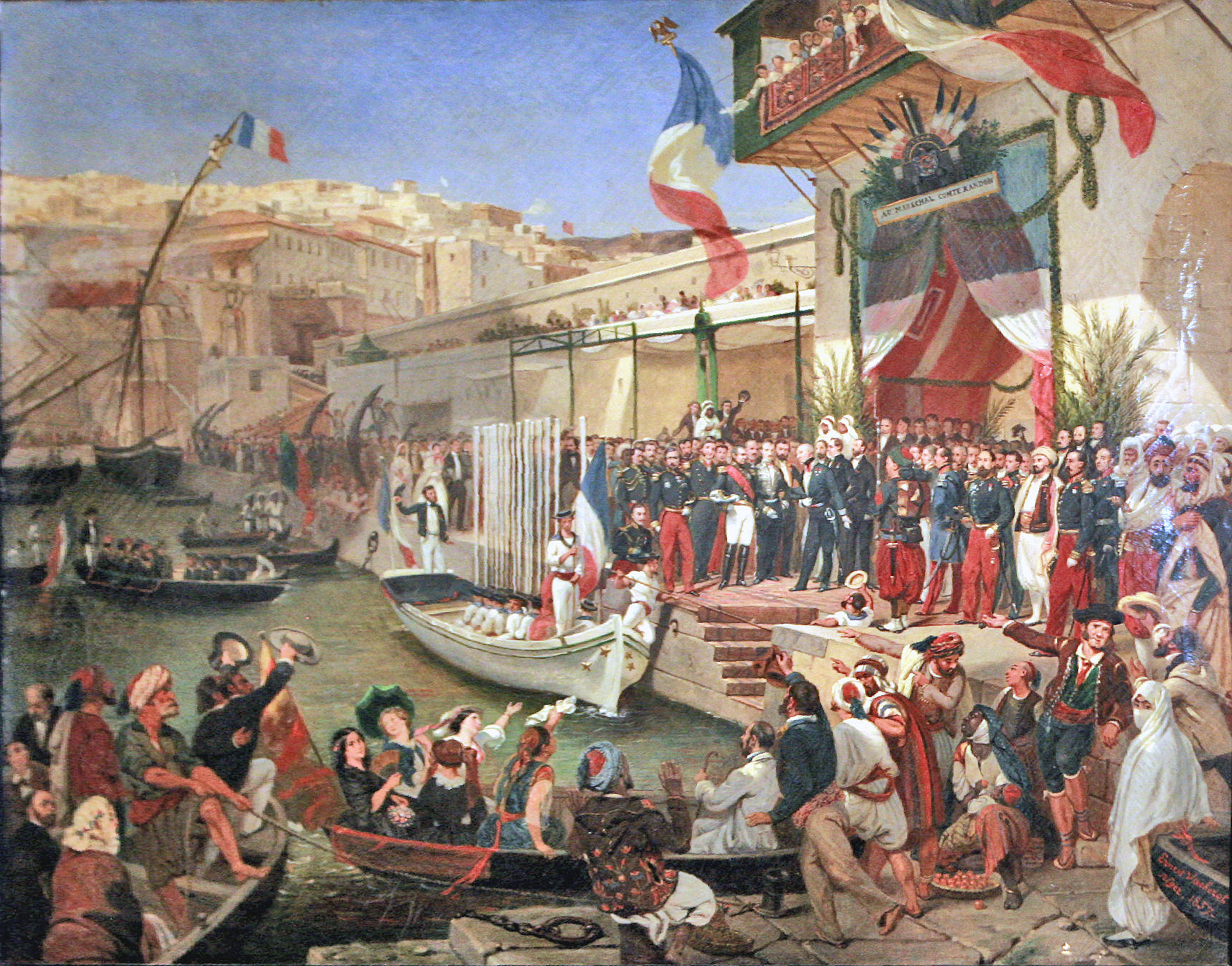
Arrival of Marshal Randon in Algiers in 1857

A royal ordinance in 1845 called for three types of administration in Algeria. In areas where Europeans were a substantial part of the population, colons elected mayors and councils for self-governing "full exercise" communes (communes de plein exercice). In the "mixed" communes, where Muslims were a large majority, government was in the hands of appointed and some elected officials, including representatives of the grands chefs (great chieftains) and a French administrator. The indigenous communes (communes indigènes), remote areas not adequately pacified, remained under the régime du sabre (rule of the sword).

By 1848 nearly all of northern Algeria was under French control. Important tools of the colonial administration, from this time until their elimination in the 1870s, were the bureaux arabes (Arab Bureaus), staffed by Arabists whose function was to collect information on the indigenous people and to carry out administrative functions, nominally in cooperation with the army. The bureaux arabes on occasion acted with sympathy to the local population and formed a buffer between Muslims and colons.

Under the régime du sabre, the colons had been permitted limited self-government in areas where European settlement was most intense, but there was constant friction between them and the army. The colons charged that the bureaux arabes hindered the progress of colonization. They agitated against military rule, complaining that their legal rights were denied under the arbitrary controls imposed on the colony and insisting on a civil administration for Algeria fully integrated with metropolitan France. The army warned that the introduction of civilian government would invite Muslim retaliation and threaten the security of Algeria. The French government vacillated in its policy, yielding small concessions to the colon demands on the one hand while maintaining the régime du sabre to control the Muslim majority on the other.

=== Under the French Second Republic and Second Empire (1848–70) ===
Merchant ensign circa 1848–1910

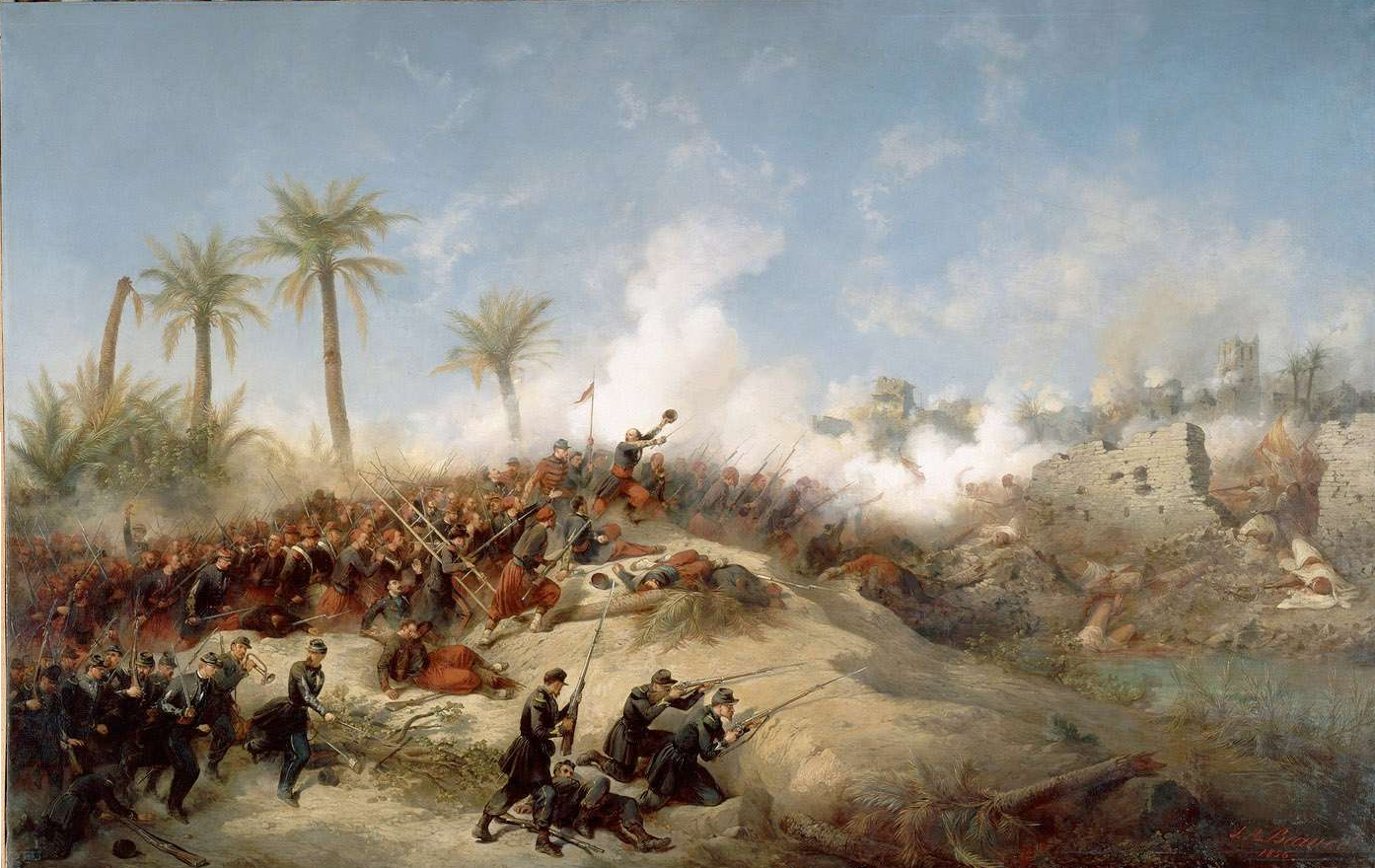
The Assault on Zaatcha by Jean-Adolphe Beaucé, 1855

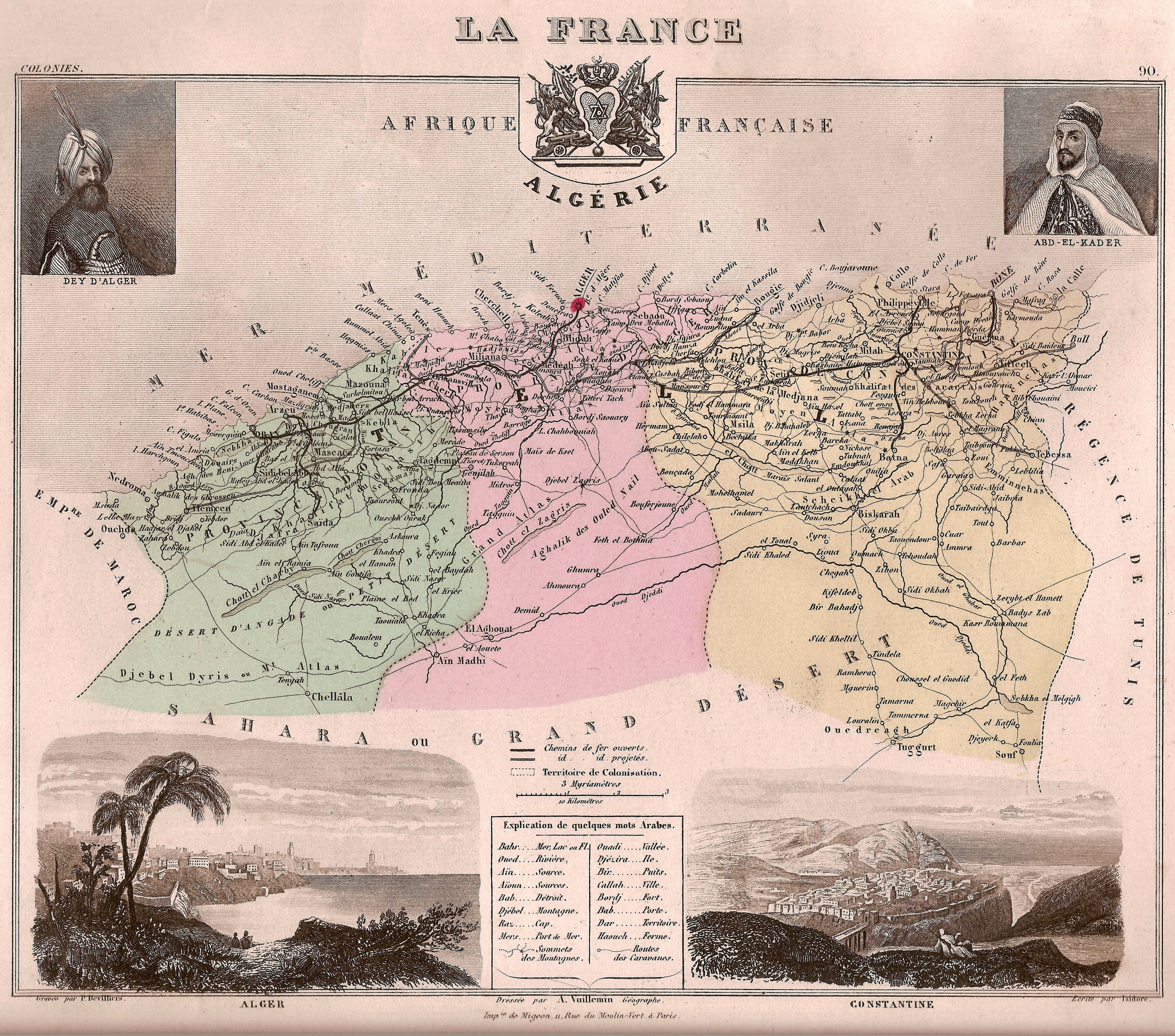
1877 map of the three French departments of Alger, Oran and Constantine

Shortly after Louis Philippe's constitutional monarchy was overthrown in the revolution of 1848, the new government of the Second Republic ended Algeria's status as a colony and declared in the 1848 Constitution the occupied lands an integral part of France. Three civil territories – Alger, Oran, and Constantine – were organized as Departments of France (local administrative units) under a civilian government. This made them a part of France proper as opposed to a colony. For the first time, French citizens in the civil territories elected their own councils and mayors; Muslims had to be appointed, could not hold more than one-third of council seats, and could not serve as mayors or assistant mayors. The administration of territories outside the zones settled by colons remained under the French Army. Local Muslim administration was allowed to continue under the supervision of French Army commanders, charged with maintaining order in newly pacified regions, and the bureaux arabes. Theoretically, these areas were closed to European colonization.

=== Land and colonisers ===
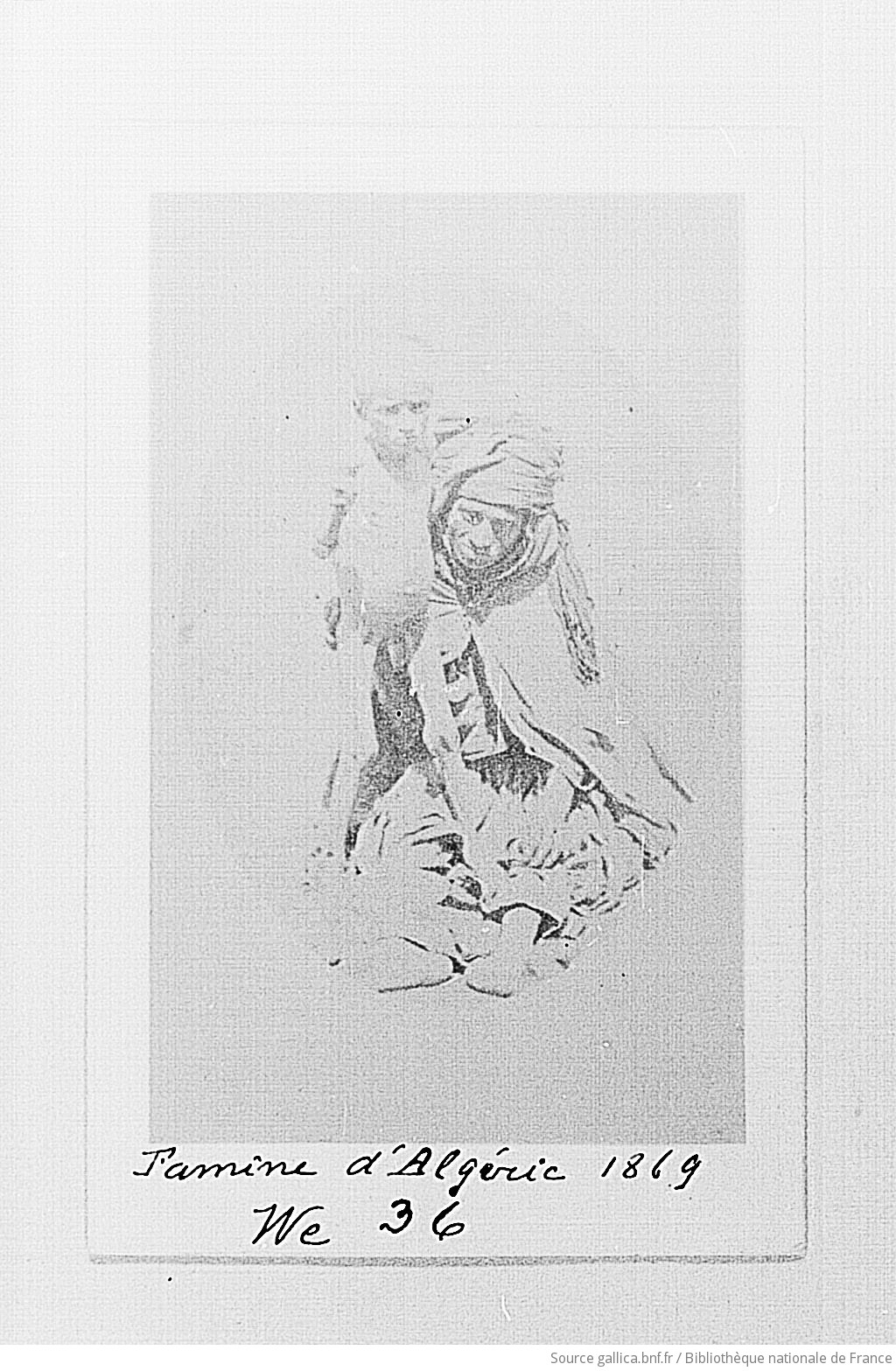
The famine of Algeria in 1869

Even before the decision was made to annex Algeria, major changes had taken place. In a bargain-hunting frenzy to take over or buy at low prices all manner of property—homes, shops, farms and factories—Europeans poured into Algiers after it fell. French authorities took possession of the beylik lands, from which Ottoman officials had derived income. Over time, as pressures increased to obtain more land for settlement by Europeans, the state seized more categories of land, particularly that used by tribes, religious foundations, and villages.

Called either colons (settlers), Algerians, or later, especially following the 1962 independence of Algeria, pieds noirs (literally, black feet), the European settlers were largely of peasant farmer or working-class origin from the poor southern areas of Italy, Spain, and France. Others were criminal and political deportees from France, transported under sentence in large numbers to Algeria. In the 1840s and 1850s, to encourage settlement in rural areas, official policy was to offer grants of land for a fee and a promise that improvements would be made. A distinction soon developed between the grands colons (great settlers) at one end of the scale, often self-made men who had accumulated large estates or built successful businesses, and smallholders and workers at the other end, whose lot was often not much better than that of their Muslim counterparts. According to historian John Ruedy, although by 1848 only 15,000 of the 109,000 European settlers were in rural areas, "by systematically expropriating both pastoralists and farmers, rural colonization was the most important single factor in the destructuring of traditional society."

European migration, encouraged during the Second Republic, stimulated the civilian administration to open new land for settlement against the advice of the army. With the advent of the Second Empire in 1852, Napoleon III returned Algeria to military control. In 1858 a separate Ministry of Algerian Affairs was created to supervise administration of the country through a military governor general assisted by a civil minister.

Napoleon III visited Algeria twice in the early 1860s. He was profoundly impressed with the nobility and virtue of the tribal chieftains, who appealed to the emperor's romantic nature, and was shocked by the self-serving attitude of the colon leaders. He decided to halt the expansion of European settlement beyond the coastal zone and to restrict contact between Muslims and the colons, whom he considered to have a corrupting influence on the indigenous population. He envisioned a grand design for preserving most of Algeria for the Muslims by founding a royaume arabe (Arab kingdom) with himself as the roi des Arabes (king of the Arabs). He instituted the so-called politics of the grands chefs to deal with the Muslims directly through their traditional leaders.

To further his plans for the royaume arabe, Napoleon III issued two decrees affecting tribal structure, land tenure, and the legal status of Muslims in French Algeria. The first, promulgated in 1863, was intended to renounce the state's claims to tribal lands and eventually provide private plots to individuals in the tribes, thus dismantling "feudal" structures and protecting the lands from the colons. Tribal areas were to be identified, delimited into douars (administrative units), and given over to councils. Arable land was to be divided among members of the douar over a period of one to three generations, after which it could be bought and sold by the individual owners. Unfortunately for the tribes, however, the plans of Napoleon III quickly unraveled. French officials sympathetic to the colons took much of the tribal land they surveyed into the public domain. In addition, some tribal leaders immediately sold communal lands for quick gains. The process of converting arable land to individual ownership was accelerated to only a few years when laws were enacted in the 1870s stipulating that no sale of land by an individual Muslim could be invalidated by the claim that it was collectively owned. The cudah and other tribal officials, appointed by the French on the basis of their loyalty to France rather than the allegiance owed them by the tribe, lost their credibility as they were drawn into the European orbit, becoming known derisively as béni-oui-oui.

Napoleon III envisaged three distinct Algerias: a French colony, an Arab country, and a military camp, each with a distinct form of local government. The second decree, issued in 1865, was designed to recognize the differences in cultural background of the French and the Muslims. As French nationals, Muslims could serve on equal terms in the French armed forces and civil service and could migrate to France proper. They were also granted the protection of French law while retaining the right to adhere to Islamic law in litigation concerning their personal status. But if Muslims wished to become full citizens, they had to accept the full jurisdiction of the French legal code, including laws affecting marriage and inheritance, and reject the authority of the religious courts. In effect, this meant that a Muslim had to renounce some of the mores of his religion in order to become a French citizen. This condition was bitterly resented by Muslims, for whom the only road to political equality was perceived to be apostasy. Over the next century, fewer than 3,000 Muslims chose to cross the barrier and become French citizens. A similar status applied to the Jewish natives.

=== Under the Third Republic (1870–1940) ===
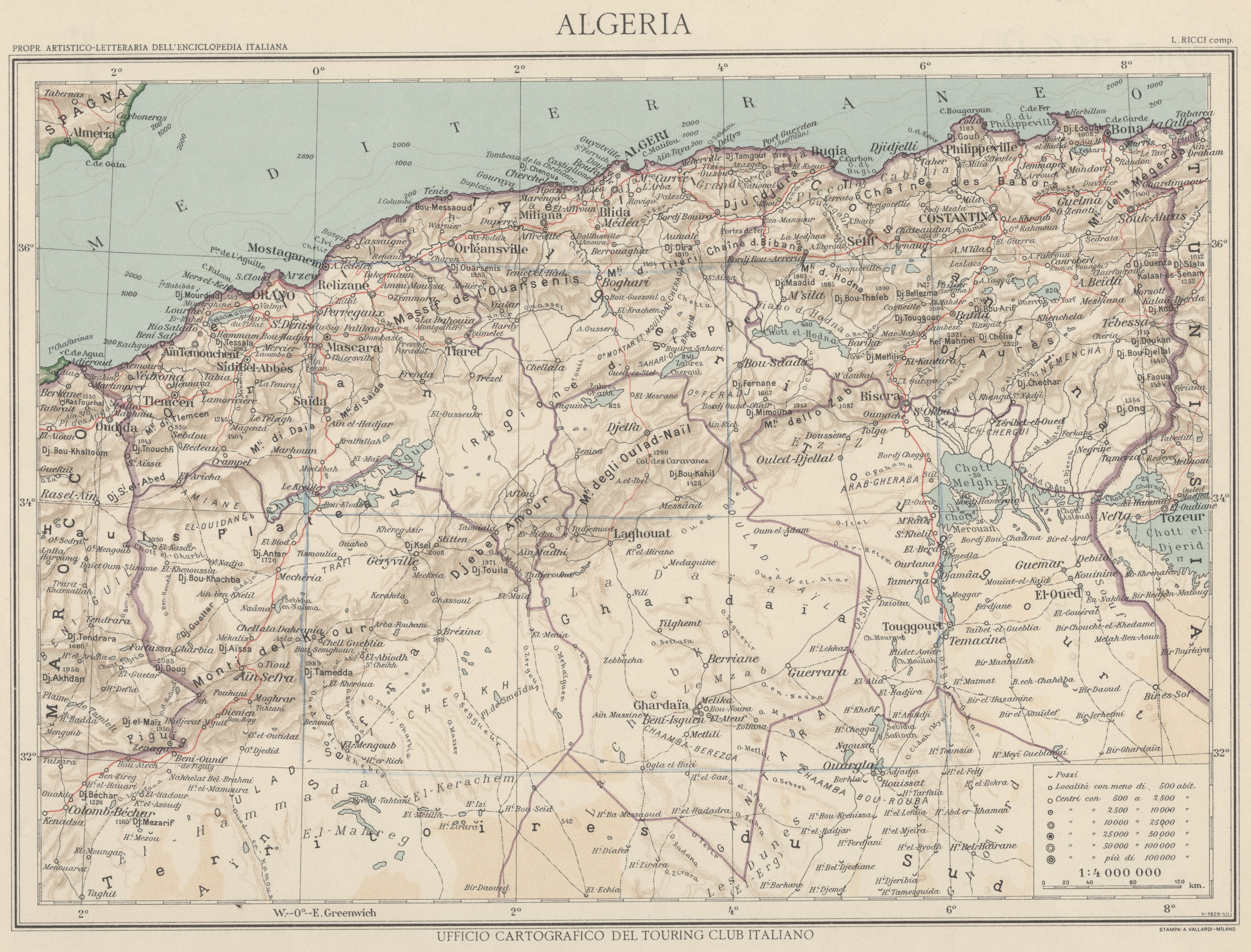
1929 map of the northern French Algeria (Touring Club Italiano)

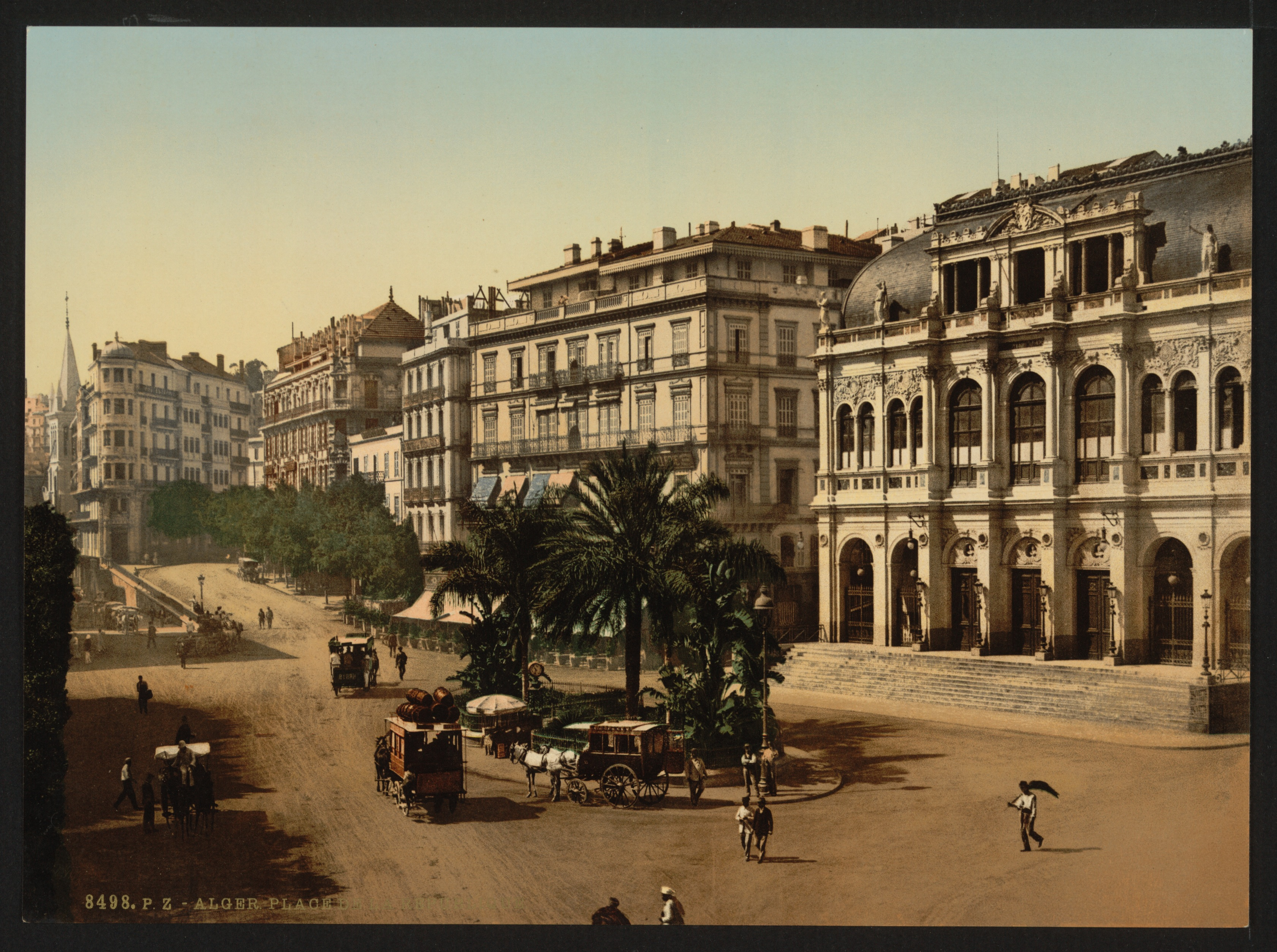
Place de la republique, Algiers, 1899

Administrative organisation between 1905 and 1955. Three départements Oran, Alger and Constantine in the north (in pink colour), and four territories Aïn-Sefra, Ghardaïa, Oasis and Touggourt in the south (in yellow). The external boundaries of the land are those between 1934 and 1962.

When the Prussians captured Napoleon III at the Battle of Sedan (1870), ending the Second Empire, demonstrations in Algiers by the colons led to the departure of the just-arrived new governor general and the replacement of the military administration by settler committees. Meanwhile, in France the government of the Third Republic directed one of its ministers, Adolphe Crémieux, "to destroy the military regime ... [and] to completely assimilate Algeria into France." In October 1870, Crémieux, whose concern with Algerian affairs dated from the time of the Second Republic, issued a series of decrees providing for representation of the Algerian départements in the National Assembly of France and confirming colon control over local administration. A civilian governor general was made responsible to the Ministry of Interior. The Crémieux Decrees also granted full French citizenship to Algerian Jews, who then numbered about 40,000. This act set them apart from Muslims, in whose eyes they were identified thereafter with the colons. The measure had to be enforced, however, over the objections of the colons, who made little distinction between Muslims and Jews. (Automatic citizenship was subsequently extended in 1889 to children of non-French Europeans born in Algeria unless they specifically rejected it.)

The loss of Alsace-Lorraine to Prussia in 1871 after the Franco-Prussian War, led to pressure on the French government to make new land available in Algeria for about 5,000 Alsatian and Lorrainer refugees who were resettled there. During the 1870s, both the amount of European-owned land and the number of settlers were doubled, and tens of thousands of unskilled Muslims, who had been uprooted from their land, wandered into the cities or to colon farming areas in search of work.

==== Kabylie insurrection ====
The most serious native insurrection since the time of Abd al-Qadir broke out in 1871 in Kabylia and spread through much of Algeria. The Mokrani Revolt was triggered by Crémieux's extension of civil (that is, colon) authority to previously self-governing tribal reserves and the abrogation of commitments made by the military government, but it had its basis in more long-standing grievances. Since the Crimean War (1854–56), the demand for grain had pushed the price of Algerian wheat up to European levels. Storage silos were emptied when the world market's impact was felt in Algeria, and Muslim farmers sold their grain reserves – including seed grain – to speculators. But the community-owned silos were the fundamental adaptation of a subsistence economy to an unpredictable climate, and a good year's surplus was stored away against a bad year's dearth. When serious drought struck Algeria and grain crops failed in 1866 and for several years following, Muslim areas faced starvation, and with famine came pestilence. It was estimated that 20% of the Muslim population of Constantine died over a three-year period. In 1871 the civil authorities repudiated guarantees made to tribal chieftains by the previous military government for loans to replenish their seed supply. This act alienated even pro-French Muslim leaders, while it undercut their ability to control their people. It was against this background that the stricken Kabyles rose in revolt, following immediately on the mutiny in January 1871 of a squadron of Muslim spahis in the French Army who had been ordered to embark for France. The withdrawal of a large proportion of the army stationed in Algeria to serve in the Franco-Prussian War had weakened France's control of the territory, while reports of defeats undermined French prestige amongst the indigenous population.

In the aftermath of the 1871 uprising, French authorities imposed stern measures to punish and control the entire Muslim population. France confiscated more than 5,000 km^{2} (1,900 sq mi) of tribal land and placed Kabylia under a régime d'exception (extraordinary rule), which denied due process guaranteed French nationals. A special indigénat (native code) listed as offenses acts such as insolence and unauthorized assembly not punishable by French law, and the normal jurisdiction of the cudah was sharply restricted. The governor general was empowered to jail suspects for up to five years without trial. The argument was made in defense of these exceptional measures that the French penal code as applied to Frenchmen was too permissive to control Muslims. Some were deported to New Caledonia, see Algerians of the Pacific.

==== Conquest of the southwestern territories ====
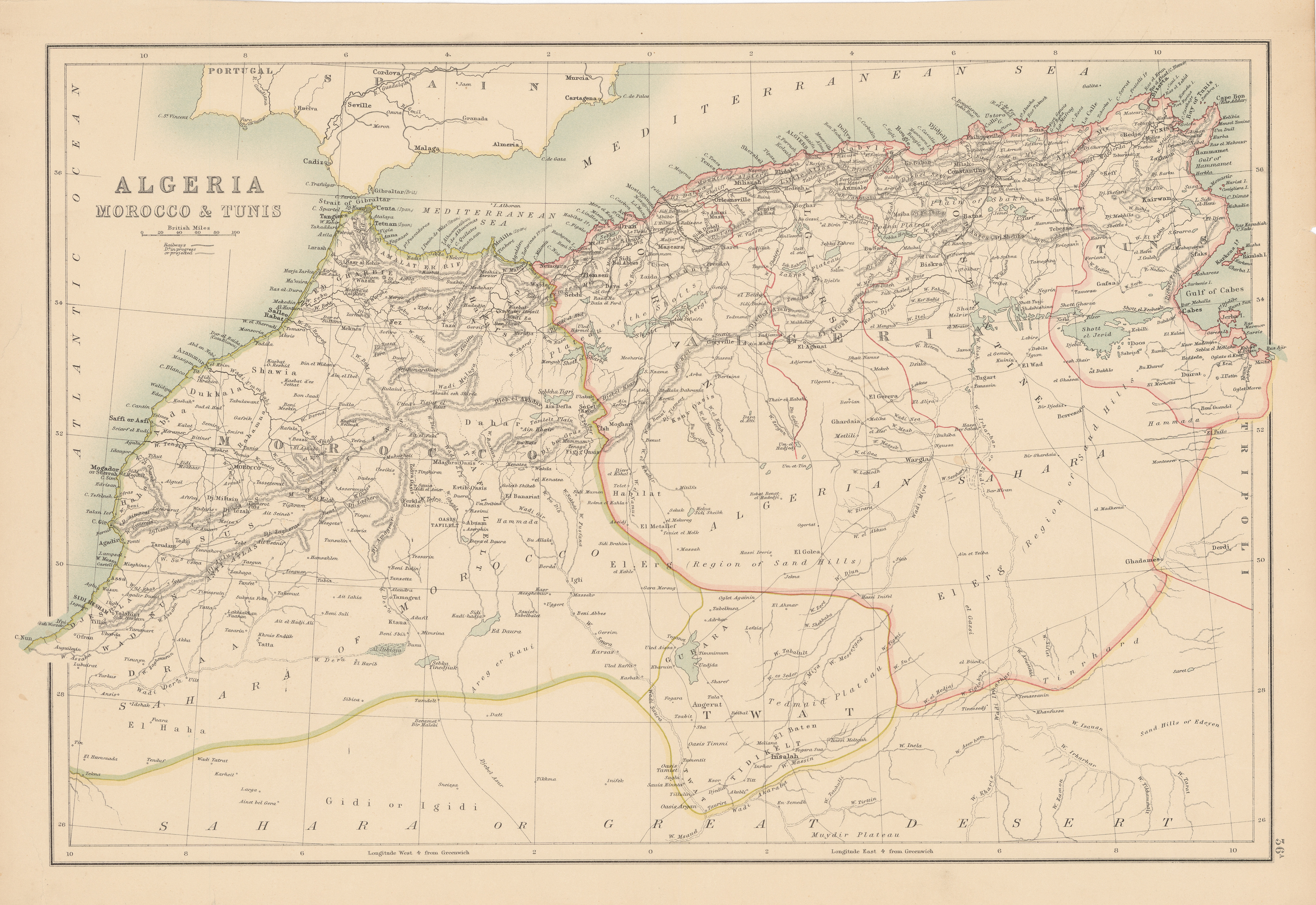
The Maghreb in the second half of the 19th century

In the 1890s, the French administration and military called for the annexation of the Touat, the Gourara and the Tidikelt, a complex that during the period prior to 1890, was part of what was known as the Bled es-Siba (land of dissidence)), regions that were nominally Moroccan but which were not submitted to the authority of the central government.

An armed conflict opposed French 19th Corps' Oran and Algiers divisions to the Aït Khabbash, a faction of the Aït Ounbgui khams of the Aït Atta confederation. The conflict ended by the annexation of the Touat-Gourara-Tidikelt complex by France in 1901.

In the 1930s, the Saoura valley and the region of Tindouf were in turn annexed to French Algeria at the expense of Morocco, then under French protectorate since 1912. In 1938, the French government was given further control of military affairs in French Algeria following a decree from the President giving the Minister of the Interior Albert Sarraut control over Algeria.

==== Conquest of the Sahara ====
The French military expedition led by Lieutenant-Colonel Paul Flatters, was annihilated by Tuareg attack in 1881.

The French took advantage of long-standing animosity between Tuareg and Chaamba Arabs. The newly raised Compagnies Méharistes were originally recruited mainly from the Chaamba nomadic tribe. The Méhariste camel corps provided an effective means of policing the desert.

In 1902, Lieutenant Gaston-Ernest Cottenest penetrated Hoggar Mountains and defeated Ahaggar Tuareg in the battle of Tit.

=== During World War II (1940–45) ===
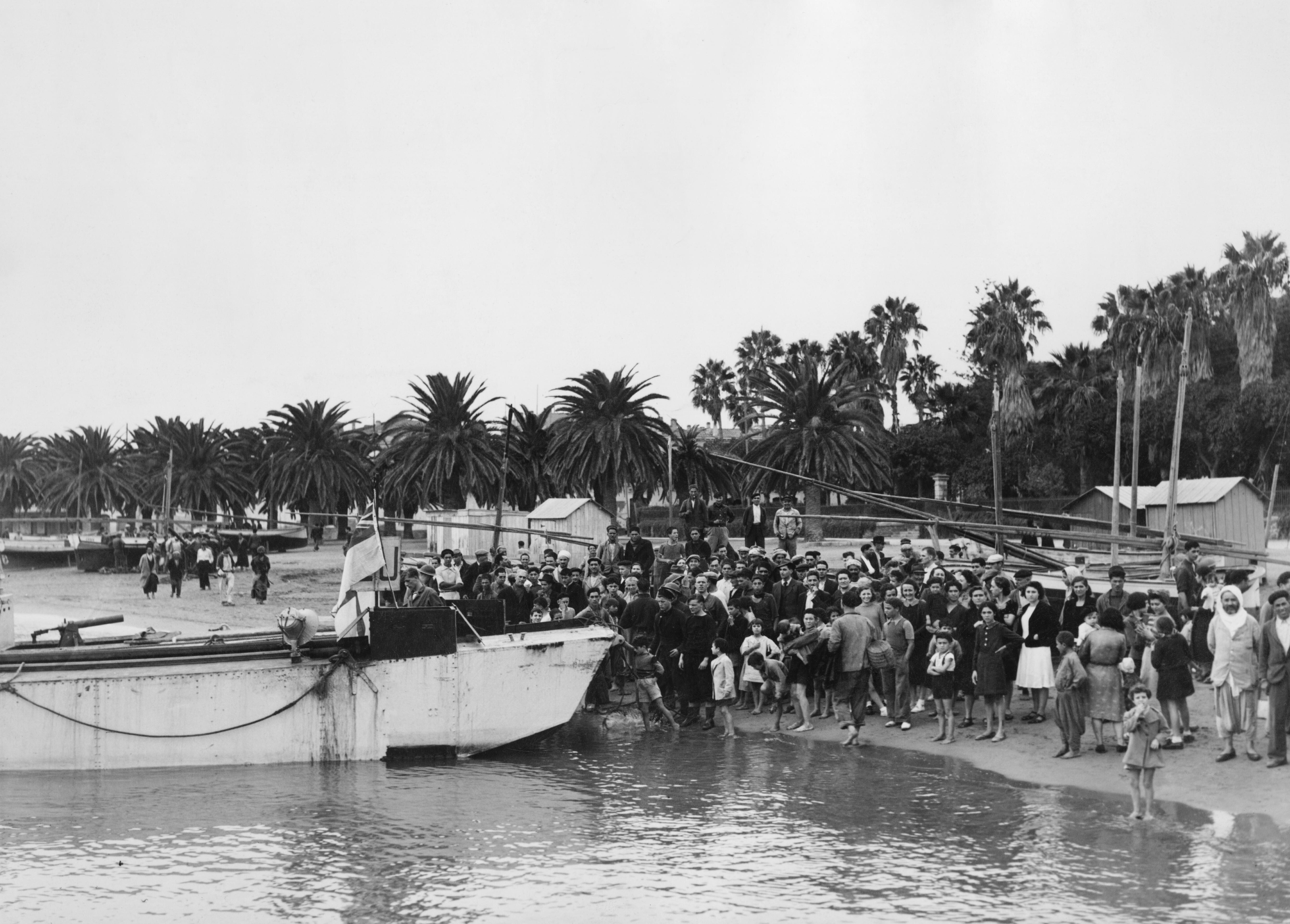
Arzew inhabitants meet Royal Marines in November 1942 during Allied Operation Torch

Colonial troops of French Algeria were sent to fight in metropolitan France during the Battle of France in 1940. After the Fall of France, the Third French Republic collapsed and was replaced by Philippe Pétain's French State, better known as Vichy France.

On 3 July 1940, the British Royal Navy attacked the French Navy's fleet at Mers El Kébir, killing more than 1,200 men.

=== Under the Fourth Republic (1946–58) ===
[The French] had been for over a hundred years in Algeria and were determined that it was part of France, and they damn well were going to stay there. Of course, there was a very strong school of thought in the rest of Africa that they damn well weren't.

— US Assistant Secretary of State for African Affairs, Joseph C. Satterthwaite,

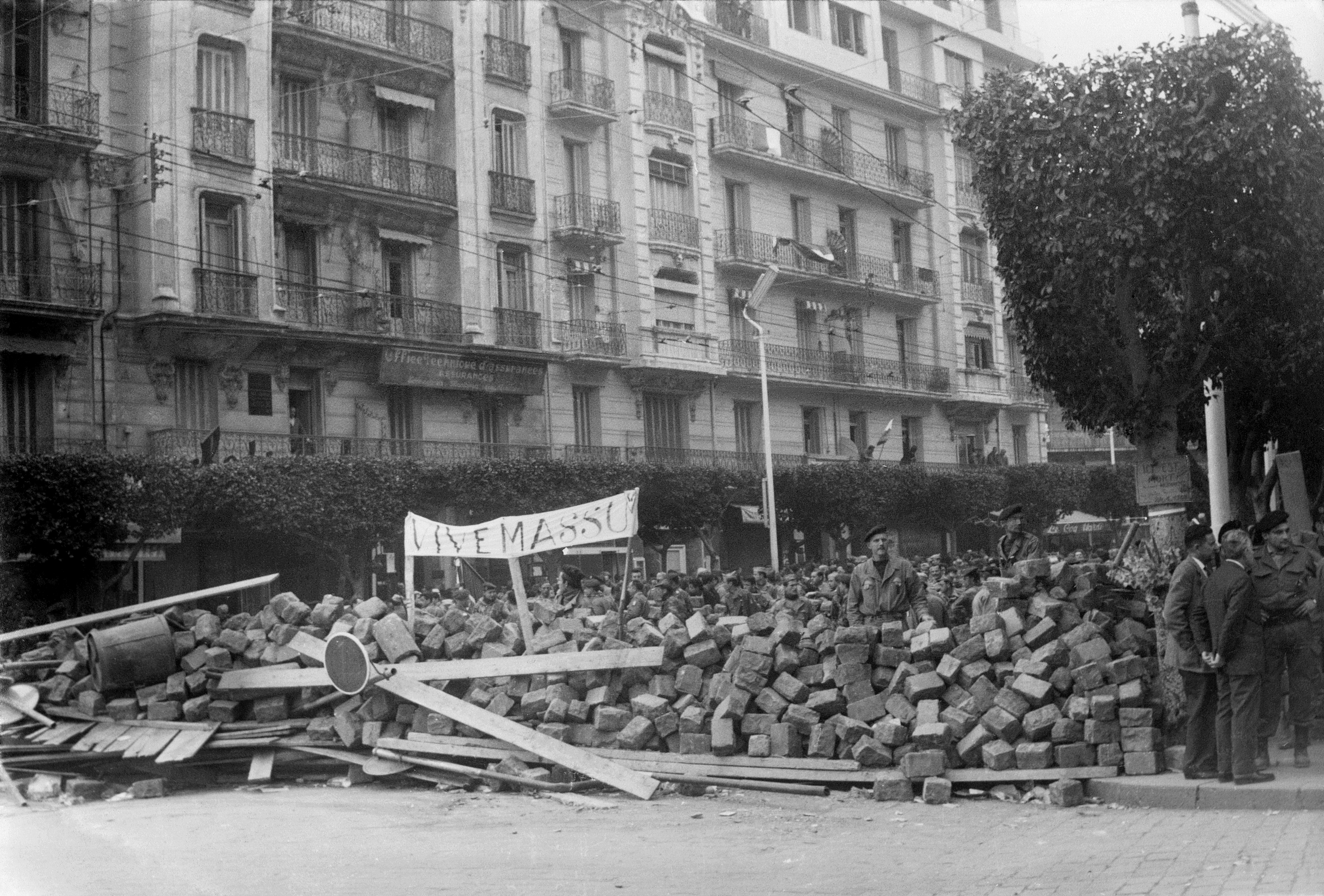
Supporters of General Jacques Massu set barricades in Algiers in January 1960

Many Algerians had fought as French soldiers during the Second World War. Thus Algerian Muslims felt that it was even more unjust that their votes were not equal to those of the other Algerians, especially after 1947 when the Algerian Assembly was created. This assembly was composed of 120 members. Algerian Muslims, representing about 6.85 million people, could designate 50% of the Assembly members, while 1,150,000 non-Muslim Algerians could designate the other half. Moreover, a massacre occurred in Sétif on 8 May 1945. It opposed Algerians who were demonstrating for their national claim to the French Army. After skirmishes with police, Algerians killed about 100 French. The French army retaliated harshly, resulting in the deaths of approximately 6,000 to 45,000 Algerians. This triggered a radicalization of Algerian nationalists and could be considered the beginning of the Algerian War.

In 1956, about 512,000 French soldiers were in Algeria. No resolution was imaginable in the short term. An overwhelming majority of French politicians were opposed to the idea of independence while independence was gaining ground in Muslim Algerians' minds. France was deadlocked and the Fourth Republic collapsed over this dispute.

=== Under the Fifth Republic (1958–62) ===
In 1958, Charles de Gaulle's return to power in response to a military coup in Algiers in May was supposed to keep Algeria's status quo as departments of France as hinted by his speeches delivered in Oran and Mostaganem on 6 June 1958, in which he exclaimed "Vive l'Algérie française!" (lit. "Long live French Algeria!"). De Gaulle's republican constitution project was approved through the September 1958 referendum and the Fifth Republic was established the following month with de Gaulle as its president.

The latter consented to independence in 1962 after a referendum on Algerian self-determination in January 1961 and despite a subsequent aborted military coup in Algiers led by four French generals in April 1961.

== Post-colonial relations ==
Relations between post-colonial Algeria and France have remained close throughout the years, although sometimes difficult. In 1962, the Évian Accords peace treaty provided land in the Sahara for the French Army, which it had used under de Gaulle to carry out its first nuclear tests (Gerboise Bleue). Many European settlers (pieds-noirs) living in Algeria and Algerian Jews, who unlike Algerian Muslims had been granted French citizenship by the Crémieux decrees at the end of the 19th century, were expelled to France where they formed a new community. On the other hand, the issue of the harkis, the Muslims who had fought on the French side during the war, still remained unresolved. Large numbers of harkis were killed in 1962, during the immediate aftermath of the Algerian War, while those who escaped with their families to France have tended to remain an unassimilated refugee community. The present Algerian government continues to refuse to allow harkis and their descendants to return to Algeria.

On 23 February 2005, the French law on colonialism was an act passed by the Union for a Popular Movement (UMP) conservative majority, which imposed on high-school (lycée) teachers to teach the "positive values" of colonialism to their students, in particular in North Africa (article 4). The law created a public uproar and opposition from the whole of the left-wing, and was finally repealed by President Jacques Chirac (UMP) at the beginning of 2006, after accusations of historical revisionism from various teachers and historians.

There were fears that the French law on colonialism would hinder confronting the dark side of French rule in Algeria because article four of the law decreed among other things that "School programmes are to recognise in particular the positive role of the French presence overseas, especially in North Africa." Benjamin Stora, a leading specialist on French Algerian history of colonialism and a pied-noir himself, said "France has never taken on its colonial history. It is a big difference with the Anglo-Saxon countries, where post-colonial studies are now in all the universities. We are phenomenally behind the times." In his opinion, although the historical facts were known to academics, they were not well known by the French public, and this led to a lack of honesty in France over French colonial treatment of the Algerian people.

In 2017, President Emmanuel Macron described France's colonization of Algeria as a "crime against humanity ." He also said: "It's truly barbarous and it's part of a past that we need to confront by apologizing to those against whom we committed these acts." Polls following his remarks reflected a decrease in his support.

In July 2020, the remains of 24 Algerian resistance fighters and leaders, who were decapitated by the French colonial forces in the 19th century and whose skulls were taken to Paris as war trophies and held in the Musee de l'Homme in Paris, were repatriated to Algeria and buried in the Martyrs' Square at El Alia Cemetery.

In January 2021, Macron stated there would be "no repentance nor apologies" for the French colonization of Algeria, colonial abuses or French involvement during the Algerian independence war. Instead efforts would be devoted toward reconciliation.

In December 2025, the People's National Assembly of Algeria passed a law criminalizing the French occupation of the country and demanding restitution from France.

== Algérie française ==
Algérie française was a slogan used about 1960 by those French people who wanted to keep Algeria ruled by France. Literally "French Algeria", it means that the three départements of Algeria were to be considered integral parts of France. By integral parts, it is meant that they have their deputies (representatives) in the French National Assembly, and so on. Further, the people of Algeria who were to be permitted to vote for the deputies would be those who universally accepted French law, rather than sharia (which was used in personal cases among Algerian Muslims under laws dating back to Napoleon III), and such people were predominantly of French origin or Jewish origin. Many who used this slogan were returnees.

Adherence to the slogan was indicated by sounding a whistle or a car horn in the form of three telegraphic dots followed by two dashes, as "al-gé-rie-fran-çaise." Whole choruses of such horn soundings were heard. This was intended to be reminiscent of the Second World War slogan, "V for Victory", which had been three dots followed by a dash. The intention was that the opponents of Algérie française were to be considered as traitorous as the collaborators with Germany during the Occupation of France.

== See also ==
- Le Chant des Africains
- Boufarik colonization monument
- List of French possessions and colonies
- Nationalism and resistance in Algeria
- Scramble for Africa
- Exodus of the Pied-Noirs
