= Edmond-Charles de Martimprey =

French soldier

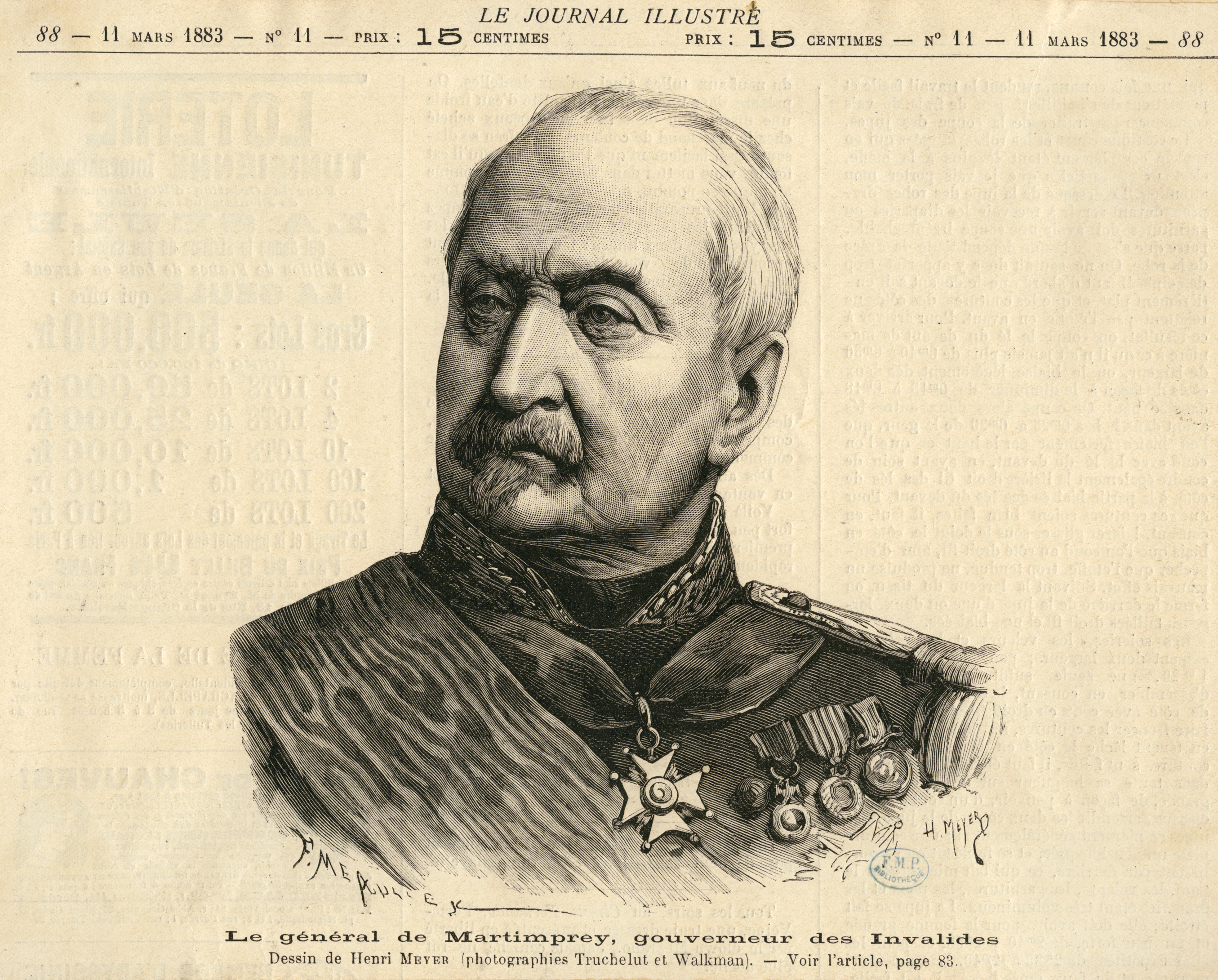
- Martimprey from Le Journal Illustreé 11 March 1883

Governor General of Algeria
- In office 22 May 1864 – 1 September 1864
- Preceded by: Aimable Pélissier
- Succeeded by: Patrice de MacMahon

Senator of France
- In office 1 September 1864 – 4 September 1870

Personal details
- Born: 16 June 1808 Meaux, Seine-et-Marne, France
- Died: 24 February 1883 (aged 74) Paris, France
- Occupation: Soldier

Count Edmond-Charles de Martimprey (16 June 1808 – 24 February 1883) was a French soldier, briefly Governor General of Algeria, and then Senator of France for the remainder of the Second French Empire.

== Life ==
=== Early years (1808–48) ===
Edmond-Charles de Martimprey was born in Meaux, Seine-et-Marne, on 16 June 1808. His parents were Augustin Dominique de Martimprey (1780–1869) and Angélique Françoise Royer de Maulny (ca 1790–1865). His younger brother, Auguste de Martimprey, became an infantry general and died of wounds received at the Battle of Magenta in 1859. Edmond de Martimprey was a student at the École spéciale militaire de Saint-Cyr. On 3 January 1829 he entered the staff college as a sub-lieutenant. He graduated at the end of 1830. He was assigned to the 11th Infantry Regiment in Soissons. He was then assigned to the topographic section, making maps in Champagne.

De Martimprey was promoted to lieutenant on 20 June 1832, and in October that year joined the special staff corps. He obtained a posting to Algeria, arriving at Mers El Kébir near Oran on 3 November 1835. He campaigned in Africa and reached the rank of lieutenant-colonel. In Africa he was Chief of Staff of La Morcière and Cavaignac.

=== French Second Republic (1848–51) ===
During the June Days uprising in 1848 de Martimprey fought in the streets of Paris. He was promoted to colonel on 10 July 1848. On 18 October 1848 he married Louise Thérèse Mesnard de Chousy (1823–89) in Paris. Their children were Louis (1849–92), Albert (1851–1931) and Charles Auguste (1852–1935). He supported the policy of Prince Louis-Napoleon Bonaparte.

=== Second French Empire (1852–70) ===
De Martimprey was Chief of the General Staff under Marshal Randon in the Army of Algeria. In 1852 de Martimprey was appointed Brigadier General, and in 1855 Divisional General. During the Crimean War he was appointed Major General of the Army of the East. In this role he served in turn under marshals Saint-Arnaud, Canrobert and Pélissier. He was then given command of the army division at Oran, Algeria. He was next, as adjoint to Marshal Vaillant, in effect Major General of the Army of Italy in 1859.

De Martimprey was appointed to command the land and marine troops of Algeria, and then named sub-governor of the colony. On 30 December 1863 he was elevated to Grand Cross of the Legion of Honour. On the death of Marshall Pélissier he became acting Governor. He undertook several campaigns in Algeria, and in 1864 was responsible for the very strong repression of the Arab insurrection. He was made a Senator by decree on 1 September 1864. He was appointed Governor of Les Invalides on 27 April 1870.

=== French Third Republic (1870–83) ===
In 1871 de Martimprey was a member of the council of inquiry into the capitulations of Strasbourg and Metz. His hereditary title of "Count" was confirmed by decree of President MacMahon on 21 May 1874. Edmond-Charles de Martimprey died in Paris on 24 February 1883.

== Publications ==
Publications by de Martimprey include:

- Edmond-Louis-Marie de Martimprey (1845), Relevé de la frontière entre l'Algérie et le Maroc dans le Tell et le Sahara jusqu'à Tniet el Sasi (Carte en français et en arabe. - Avec le fac-similé des signatures des responsables de la convention : Gal Cte de la Rue et Hamza Ibn Ali), Paris: impr. de Kaeppelin / France. Dépôt de la guerre
- Edmond-Louis-Marie de Martimprey (1847), Études pour servir à la colonisation dans la province d'Oran. - [3], Alger: impr. du Gouvernement, p. 87
- Edmond-Louis-Marie de Martimprey (1886), Souvenirs d'un officier d'état-major, histoire de l'établissement de la domination française dans la province d'Oran, 1830-1847., Paris: Quantin, p. 295

== Sources ==
- Billot, Jean-Baptiste (2007), L'Aventure mexicaine du général Jean-Baptiste Billot (in French), Editions Publibook, ISBN 978-2-7483-3774-7
- Derrécagaix, Victor Bernard (1913), Le général de division comte de Martimprey, Librairie Chapelot
- Edmond de Martimprey (1808-1883) (in French), BnF: Bibliotheque nationale de France
- Garric, Alain, "Edmond DE MARTIMPREY Le Général", Geneanet (in French)
- "MARTIMPREY DE, Edmond Charles", Léonore (in French), Ministry of Culture
- Robert, Adolphe; Cougny, Gaston (1889–1891), "MARTIMPREY (EDMOND-CHARLES, COMTE DE)", in Edgar Bourloton (ed.), Dictionnaire des Parlementaires français (1789–1889) (in French)
