= Pacification of Algeria =

Genocide after French conquest of Algeria

- Part of the French conquest of Algeria
- Chronological map of the French conquest
- Location: French Algeria
- Date: 1830–1875
- Target: Muslim Algerians
- Attack type: Genocide, ethnic cleansing, forced displacement, chemical warfare, scorched earth
- Deaths: 500,000–1,000,000
- Perpetrator: French colonial empire

The pacification of Algeria, also known as the Algerian genocide, refers to violent military operations between 1830 and 1875 during the French conquest of Algeria, that often involved ethnic cleansing, massacres and forced displacement, aimed at repressing various tribal rebellions by the native Algerian population. Between 500,000 and 1 million Algerians were killed, out of an estimated population of 3 million. During this period, France formally annexed Algeria in 1834, and approximately 1 million European settlers moved to the Algerian colony. Various scholars consider France's actions in Algeria as genocidal or constituting a genocide.

== Background ==
After the capture of Algiers by France and the exile of Hussein Dey, France invaded the rest of the country. Although the conquest of Algeria largely ended by 1847, shortly before its formal annexation by France, France faced several resistance movements and tribal rebellions in French Algeria.

== Campaigns ==
=== Campaigns against the Beylik of Constantine ===
After the capture of Algiers by the French in 1830, the Constantinians invested power in Ahmed Bey, who organized the fight against the French troops. He declared himself the Pasha of Algiers in 1833. He reorganized the army, initially following the Egyptian model. With the help of all the province's inhabitants, he dismantled the corps of Janissaries, subsequently focusing on a standing force consisting of 2,000 foot-soldiers from the Igawawen (Kabyle) tribes, along with 1,500 Arab cavalrymen. In 1836 an ill-fated invasion force, led by Bertrand Clauzel, had to retreat from Constantine in humiliation and defeat. However, the French captured Constantine under Sylvain Charles Valée the following year, on 13 October 1837. Afterwards, Ahmed Bey found refuge in the Aurès Mountains and continued the struggle until he surrendered in 1848.

=== Campaigns against the Emirate of Mascara ===
==== First campaign against Abd al-Qadir (1835–1837) ====
Tribal elders in the territories near Mascara chose the 25-year-old `Abd al-Qādir (Abd-el-Kader), to lead the jihad against the French. Recognised as Amir al-Muminin (commander of the faithful), he quickly gained the support of tribes in the western territories. In 1834, he concluded a treaty with General Desmichels, who was then military commander of the French Department of Oran. The treaty was reluctantly accepted by the French administration and made France recognise Abd al-Qādir as the sovereign of the territory in Oran Province not under French control, and it authorized him to send consuls to French-held cities. The treaty did not require Abd al-Qādir to recognize French rule, something glossed over in its French text. He used the peace provided by the treaty to widen his influence with tribes throughout western and central Algeria.

D'Erlon was apparently unaware of the danger posed by Abd al-Qādir's activities, but General Camille Alphonse Trézel, then in command at Oran, saw it and attempted to separate some of the tribes from Abd al-Qādir. When he succeeded in convincing two tribes near Oran to acknowledge French supremacy, Abd al-Qādir dispatched troops to move those tribes to the interior, away from French influence. Trézel countered by marching a column of troops out from Oran to protect those tribes' territory on 16 June 1835. After exchanging threats, Abd al-Qādir withdrew his consul from Oran and ejected the French consul from Mascara, a de facto declaration of war. The two forces clashed in a bloody but inconclusive engagement near the Sig River. However, when the French, who were short on provisions, began withdrawing toward Arzew, Abd al-Qādir led 20,000 men against the beleaguered column and, in the Battle of Macta routed the force, killing 500 men. The debacle led to the recall of d'Erlon.

General Clausel was appointed a second time to replace d'Erlon and led an attack against Mascara in December of that year, which Abd al-Qādir, with advance warning, had evacuated. In January 1836, he occupied Tlemcen and established a garrison there before he returned to Algiers to plan an attack against Constantine. Abd al-Qādir continued to harry the French at Tlemcen and so additional troops, under Thomas Robert Bugeaud, a veteran of the Napoleonic Wars experienced in irregular warfare, were sent from Oran to secure control up to the Tafna River and to resupply the garrison. Abd al-Qādir retreated before Bugeaud but decided to make a stand on the banks of the Sikkak River. On July 6, 1836, Bugeaud decisively defeated Abd al-Qādir in the Battle of Sikkak, losing fewer than 50 men to more than 1,000 casualties suffered by Abd al-Qādir. The battle was one of the few formal battles that Abd al-Qādir engaged in; after the loss, he restricted his actions as much as possible to guerilla-style attacks.

In May 1837, General Thomas Robert Bugeaud, then in command of Oran, negotiated the Treaty of Tafna with Abd al-Qādir that effectively recognised Abd al-Qādir's control over much of the interior of what is now Algeria.

==== Second campaign against Abd al-Qadir (1839–1847) ====
Abd al-Qādir used the Treaty of Tafna to consolidate his power over tribes throughout the interior by establishing new cities far from French control. He worked to motivate the population under French control to resist by peaceful and military means. Seeking to face the French again, he laid claim under the treaty to territory that included the main route between Algiers and Constantine. When French troops contested that claim in late 1839 by marching through a mountain defile known as the Iron Gates, Abd al-Qādir claimed a breach of the treaty and renewed calls for jihad. Throughout 1840, he waged guerilla war against the French in the provinces of Algiers and Oran, which Valée's failures to deal with adequately led to his replacement in December 1840 by General Bugeaud.

Bugeaud instituted a strategy of scorched earth, combined with fast-moving cavalry columns like those used by Abd al-Qādir to take territory from him gradually. The troops' tactics were heavy-handed, and the population suffered significantly. Abd al-Qādir was eventually forced to establish a mobile headquarters, which was known as a smala or zmelah. In 1843, French forces successfully raided his camp while he was away from it and captured more than 5,000 fighters and Abd al-Qādir's warchest.

Abd al-Qādir was forced to retreat into Morocco from which he had been receiving some support, especially from tribes in the border areas. When French diplomatic efforts to persuade Morocco to expel Abd al-Qādir failed, the French resorted to military means with the First Franco-Moroccan War in 1844 to compel the sultan to change his policy.

Eventually hemmed between French and Moroccan troops on the border in December 1847, Abd al-Qādir chose to surrender to the French under terms that would allow him to go into exile in the Middle East. The French violated the terms by holding him in France until 1852, when he was allowed to go to Damascus.

=== Revolts against French rule ===
==== Campaign of Laghouat (1852) ====
After the end of Emir Abdelkader's resistance, his cavalryman Ben Nasser decided to settle in the area around Laghouat, where he launched his revolt against France in 1851. Together with his ally, the Sharif Mohamed ben Abdallah, he fought several battles, attempting, with limited success, to defend Laghouat during the siege of Laghouat by the troops of Aimable Pélissier in 1852.

Aimable Pélissier, commanding an army of 6,000, besieged the city of Laghouat from 21 November until 4 December 1852, when the city capitulated. The brutal treatment of the inhabitants was part of the scorched earth tactic of the French army and one of the first instances of recorded use of chemical weapons on civilians. The storming of Laghouat quickly turned into several days of massacres to punish the population that was treated as combating enemies. The battle also witnessed several deaths on the French side, including that of general Bouscaren, that added to the fervor of the French soldiers in taking revenge on the population; they also desired to set an example for other towns and cities throughout the south of Algeria. About two thirds (2,500 to 3,000 out of a total of 4,500 inhabitants) of those remaining in the besieged city, including women and children, were massacred.

==== Campaign of Kabylia (1857) ====
As occupation turned into colonization, Kabylia remained the only region independent of the French government. In about 1849, a mysterious man arrived in Kabylia. He presented himself as Mohamed ben Abdallah, but is more commonly known as Sherif Boubaghla. He was probably a former lieutenant in the army of Emir Abdelkader, defeated for the last time by the French in 1847. Boubaghla refused to surrender at that battle, and retreated to Kabylia. From there he began a war against the French armies and their allies, often employing guerrilla tactics. It is there that he would come to know Lalla Fatma N'Soumer. In 1854, the French decided to launch a campaign against the region. However, Lalla Fatma's Kabyle tribes, with the help of Boubaghla's warriors, inflicted a defeat upon the French in the Battle of the Sebaou River. Later that year in July, the French were yet again defeated by Boubaghla's and Fatma's forces at the Battle of Tachekkirt. It was not until 1857 that the movement was definitively crushed.

==== Campaign against El-Mokrani (1871) ====
The most serious native insurrection since the time of Abd al-Qadir was the 1871 Mokrani Revolt in the Kabylia. The revolt was led by Cheikh Mokrani, head of the Kalâa of Ait Abbas, originally allied with the French state. One important aspect that contributed to the reasons of the revolt was the widespread perception among Kabyle leaders of a loss of autonomy in decision-making, as well as among the ǧamāʿa, Kabyle village assemblies. Around 150,000 Kabyles revolted, bringing warfare around the whole region, reaching almost the capital. However, the initial victories began to fade after the deployment of several French units which defeated the insurrection, especially with the final capture of Cheick Mokrani's brother. A number of dissidents were deported to New Caledonia, where a large Algerian community, known as Algerians of the Pacific, still exists.

== Atrocities ==
During their pacification of Algeria, French forces engaged in a scorched-earth policy against the Algerian population. Returning from an investigation trip to Algeria, Tocqueville wrote that "we make war much more barbaric than the Arabs themselves [...] it is for their part that civilization is situated." Colonel Montagnac stated that the purpose of the pacification was to "destroy everything that crawl at our feet like dogs." The scorched-earth policy, decided by Governor General Bugeaud, had devastating effects on the socio-economic and food balances of the country: "we fire little gunshot, we burn all douars, all villages, all huts; the enemy flees across taking his flock." According to Olivier Le Cour Grandmaison, the colonisation of Algeria led to the extermination of a third of the population from multiple causes (massacres, deportations, famines or epidemics) that were all interrelated.

French forces deported and banished entire Algerian tribes. The great Moorish families (of Spanish origin) of Tlemcen were exiled to the Orient (Levant), and others were emigrated elsewhere. The tribes that were considered too troublesome were banned, and some took refuge in Tunisia, Morocco and even Syria. Other tribes were deported to New Caledonia or Guyana. French forces also engaged in wholesale massacres of entire tribes. All 500 men, women and children of the El Oufia tribe were killed in one night. All 500 to 700 members of the Ouled Rhia tribe were killed by suffocation in a cave. During the Siege of Laghouat, the French army engaged in one of the first instances of recorded use of chemical weapon on civilians and other atrocities causing Algerians to refer to the period as the year of the "Khalya", Arabic for emptiness, which is commonly known to the inhabitants of Laghouat as the year that the city was emptied of its population. It is also commonly known as the year of Hessian sacks, referring to the way the captured surviving men and boys were put alive in the hessian sacks and thrown into dug-up trenches.

=== Characterisation as genocide ===
According to several historians, the methods used by the French to establish control over Algeria reached genocidal proportions, with war, famine and disease leading to the deaths of between 500,000 and 1 million Algerians within the first three decades of the conquest, out of an estimated population of 3 million. French losses from 1831 to 1851 were 3,336 killed in battle and 92,329 dead in hospital from disease and lack of medical care, rising to over 150,000 by 1870. A conservative estimate puts the total deaths on both sides at 480,000 (civilians and soldiers, mostly from disease).

Some governments and scholars have called France's conquest of Algeria a genocide, such as Raphael Lemkin, who coined the word "genocide" in the 20th century and Ben Kiernan, an Australian expert on the Cambodian genocide, who wrote in Blood and Soil: A World History of Genocide and Extermination from Sparta to Darfur on the French conquest of Algeria:

By 1875, the French conquest was complete. The war had killed approximately 825,000 indigenous Algerians since 1830. A long shadow of genocidal hatred persisted, provoking a French author to protest in 1882 that in Algeria, "we hear it repeated every day that we must expel the native and if necessary destroy him." As a French statistical journal urged five years late, "the system of extermination must give way to a policy of penetration."

— Ben Kiernan, Blood and Soil

== Gallery ==
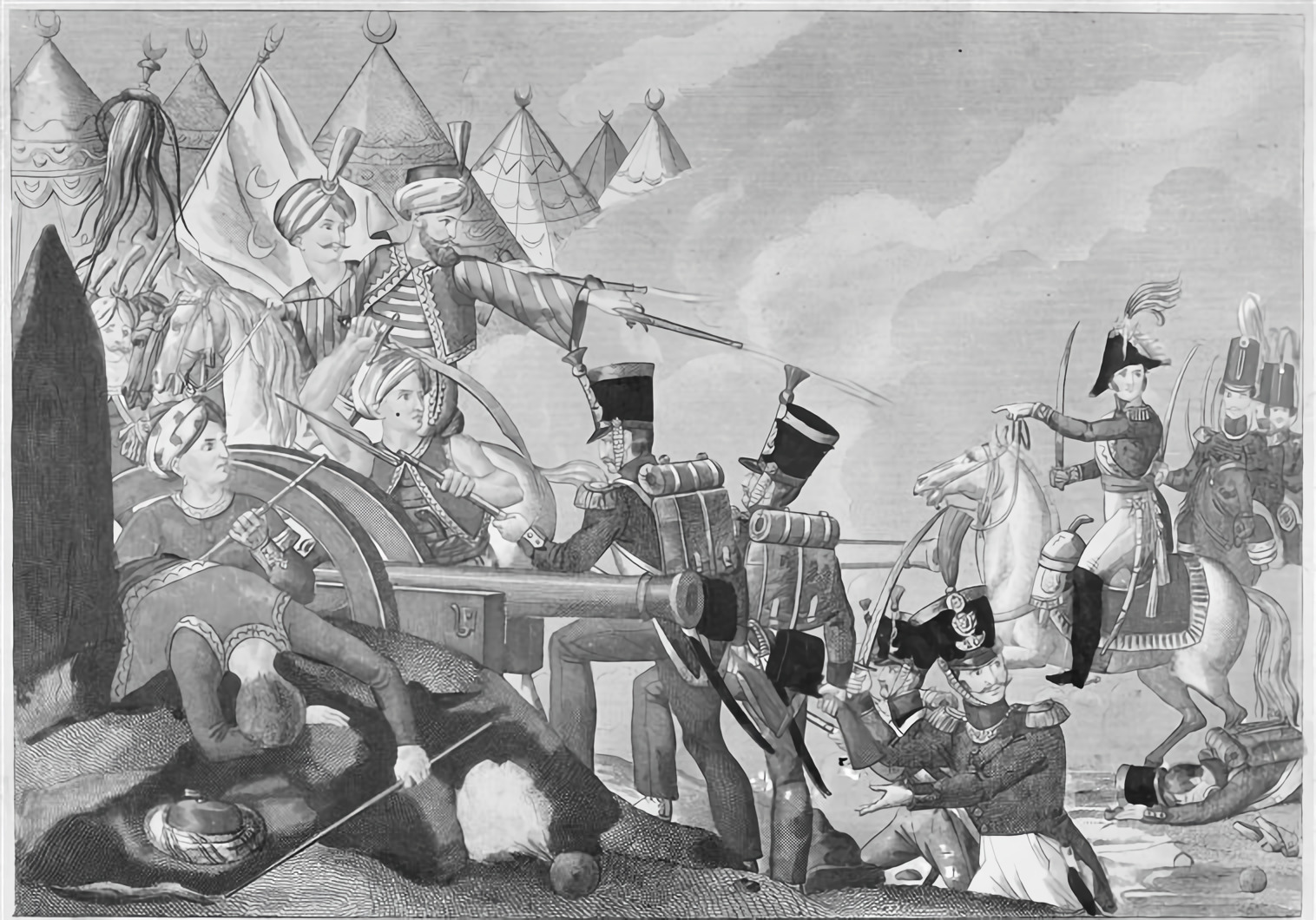
The Battle of Staouéli, 19 June 1830

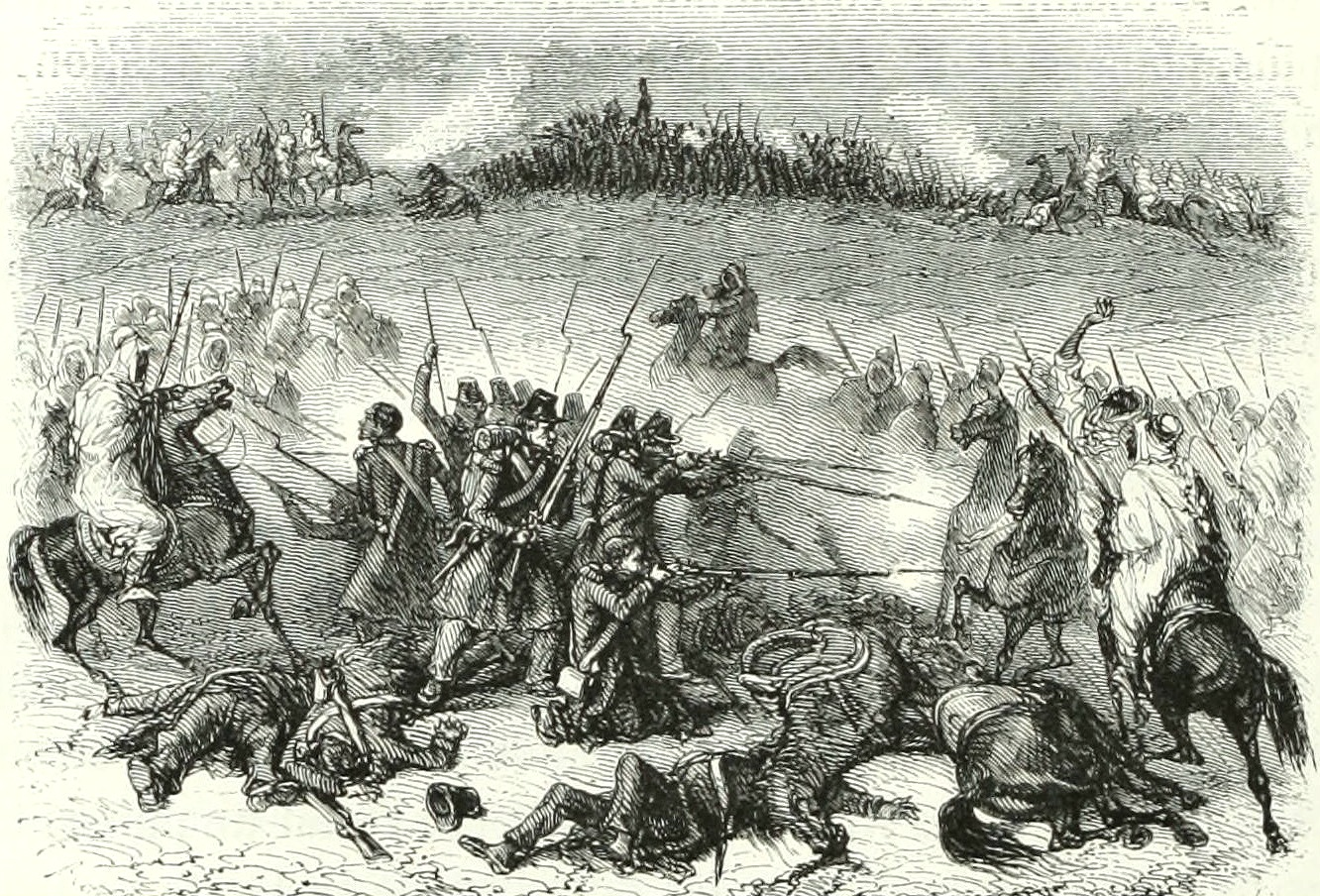
French troops defeated by Emir Abdelkader at the Battle of Macta in 1835

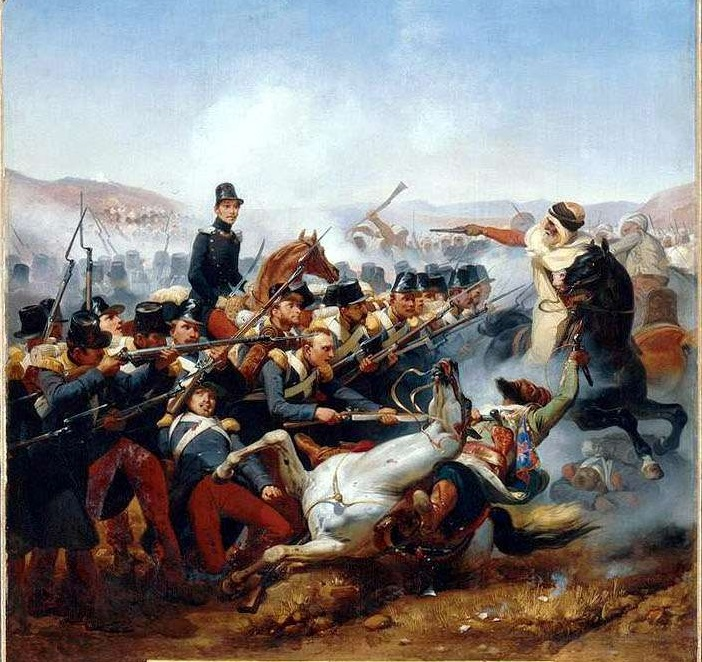
Combat of Somah in 1836 (Horace Vernet)

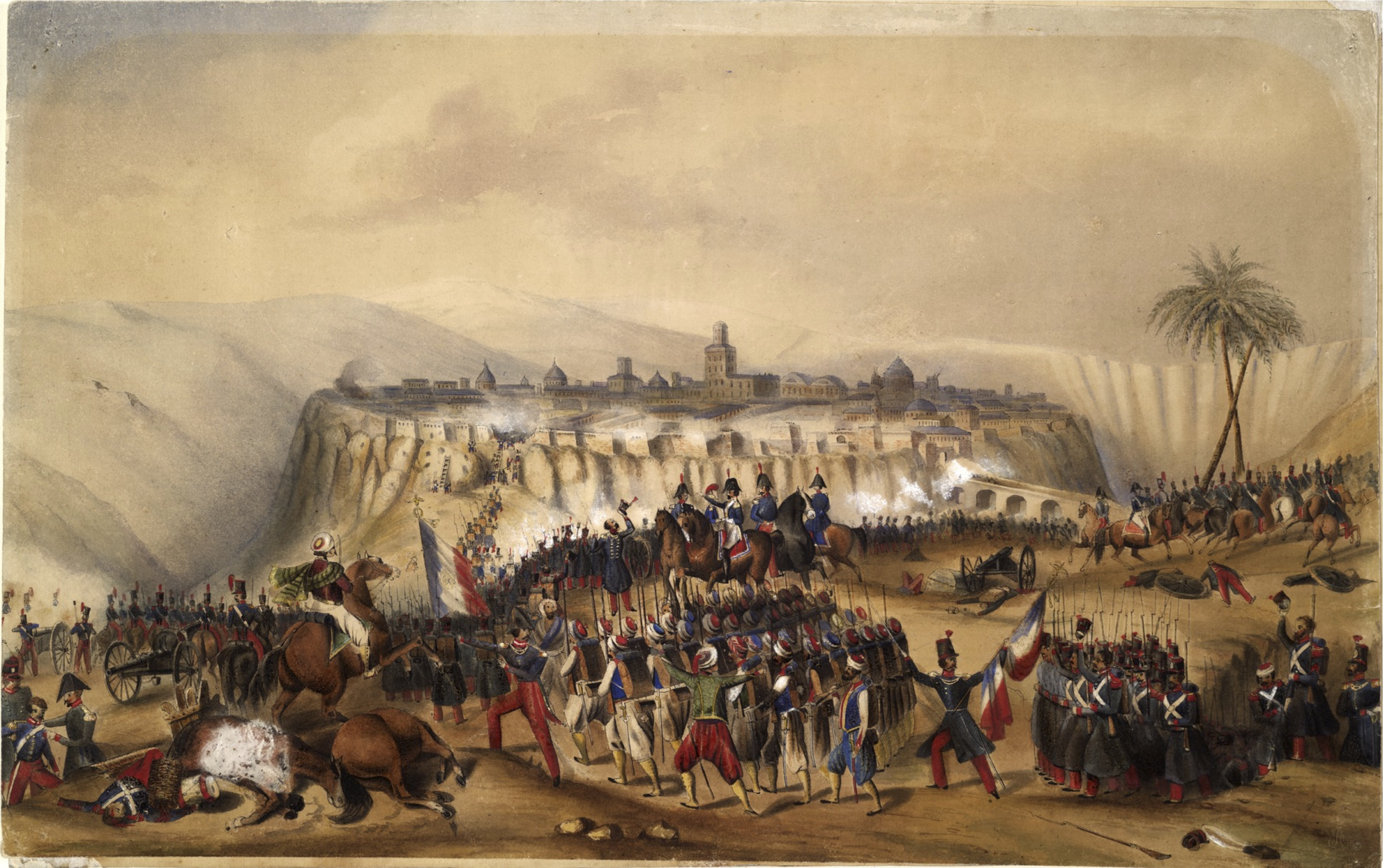
Capture of Constantine in 1837 following the failed 1836 siege

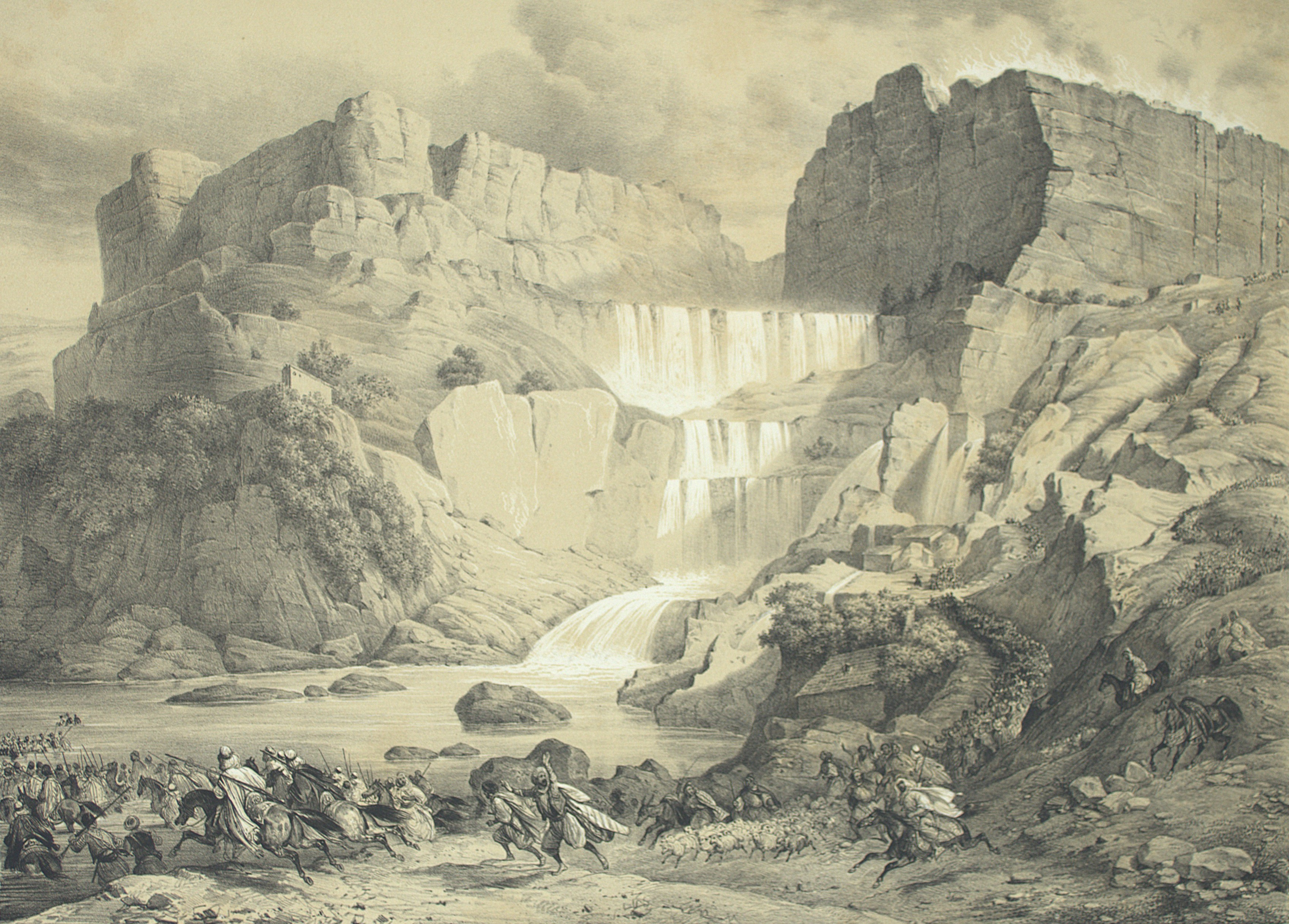
Fleeing inhabitants falling into the Rhumel during the 1837 Fall of Constantine

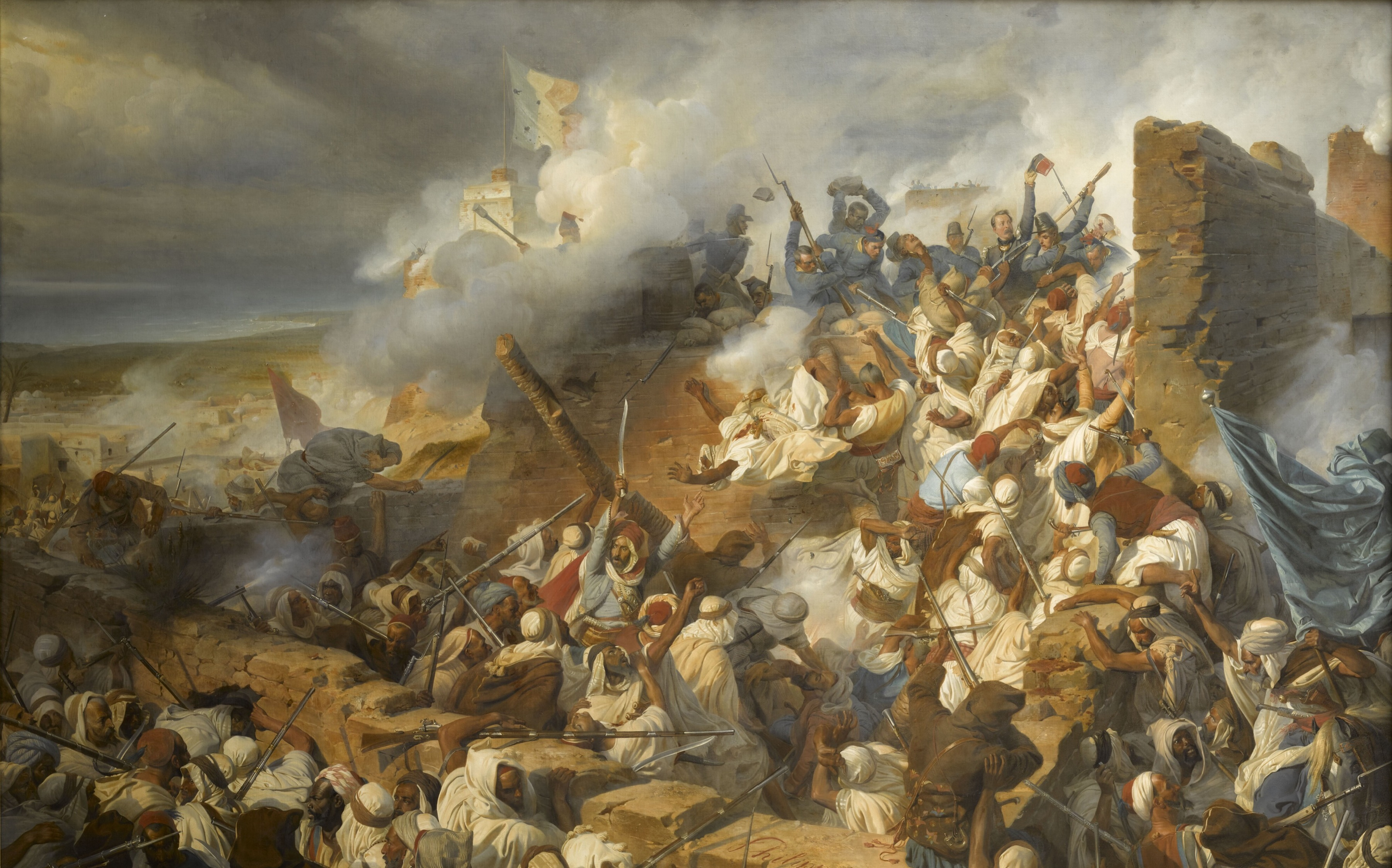
Defense of Mazagran in February 1840

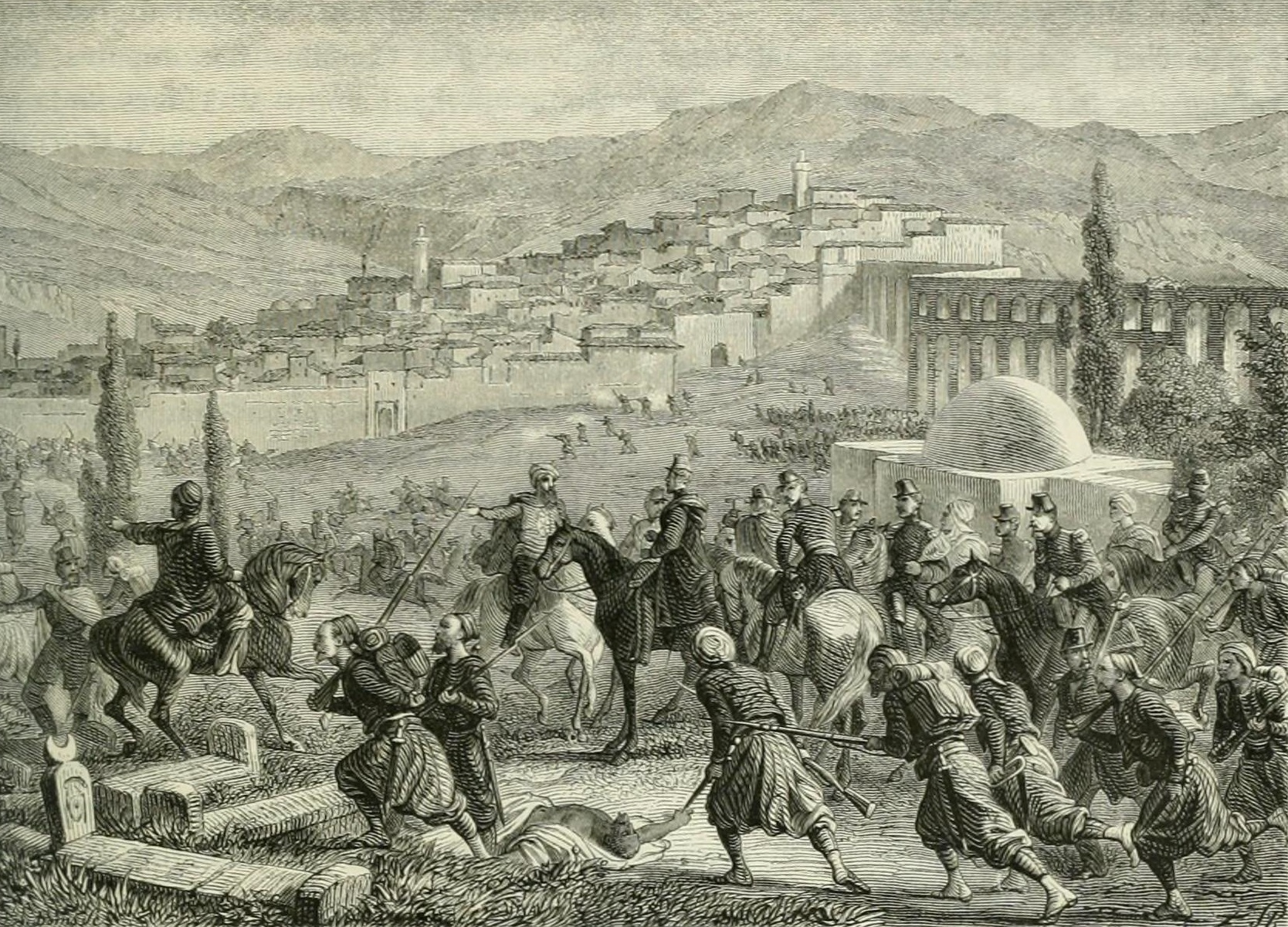
The capture of Médéa in 1840

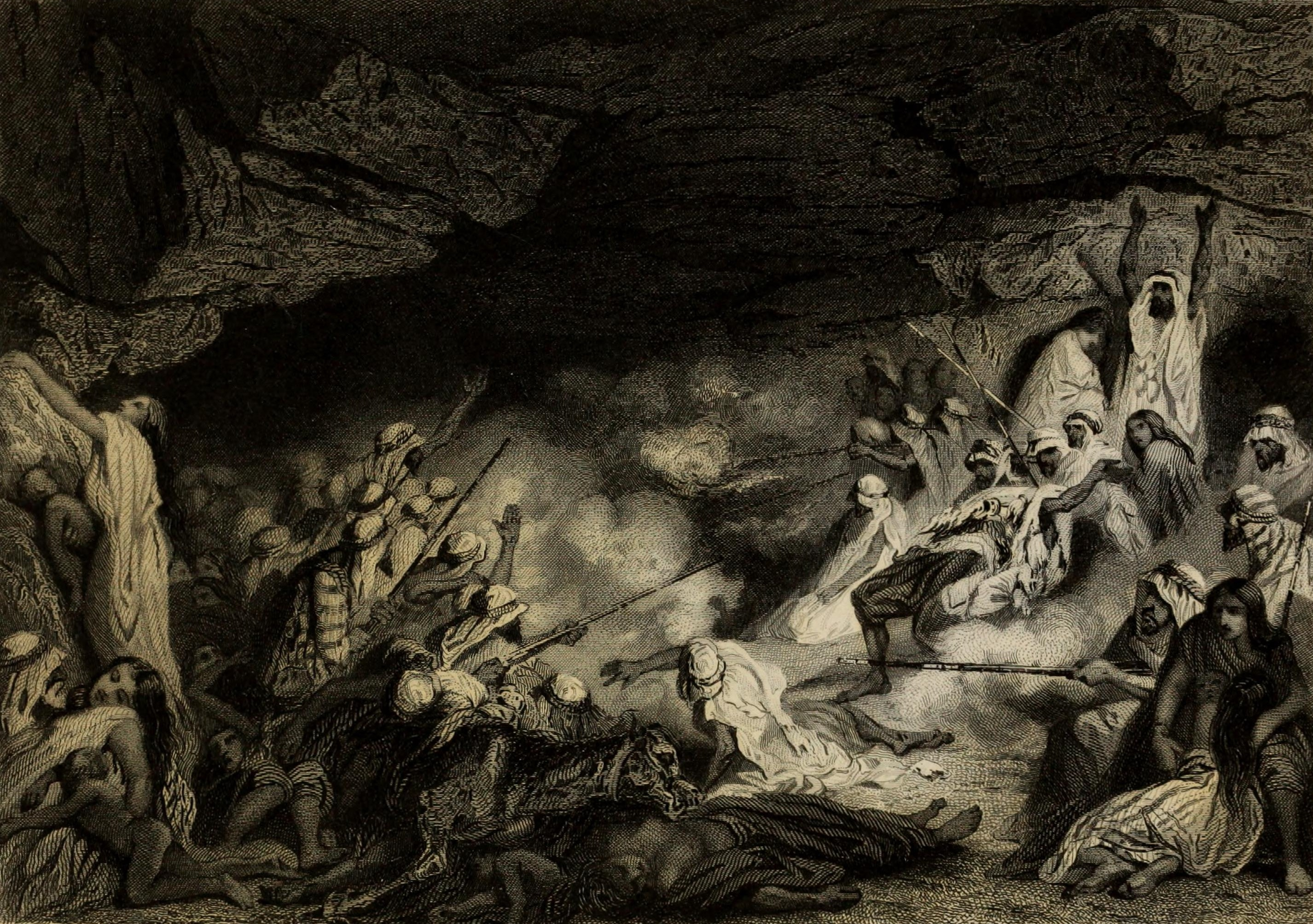
Local populations suffocated by smoke in the caves of the Dahra under General Bugeaud in 1845

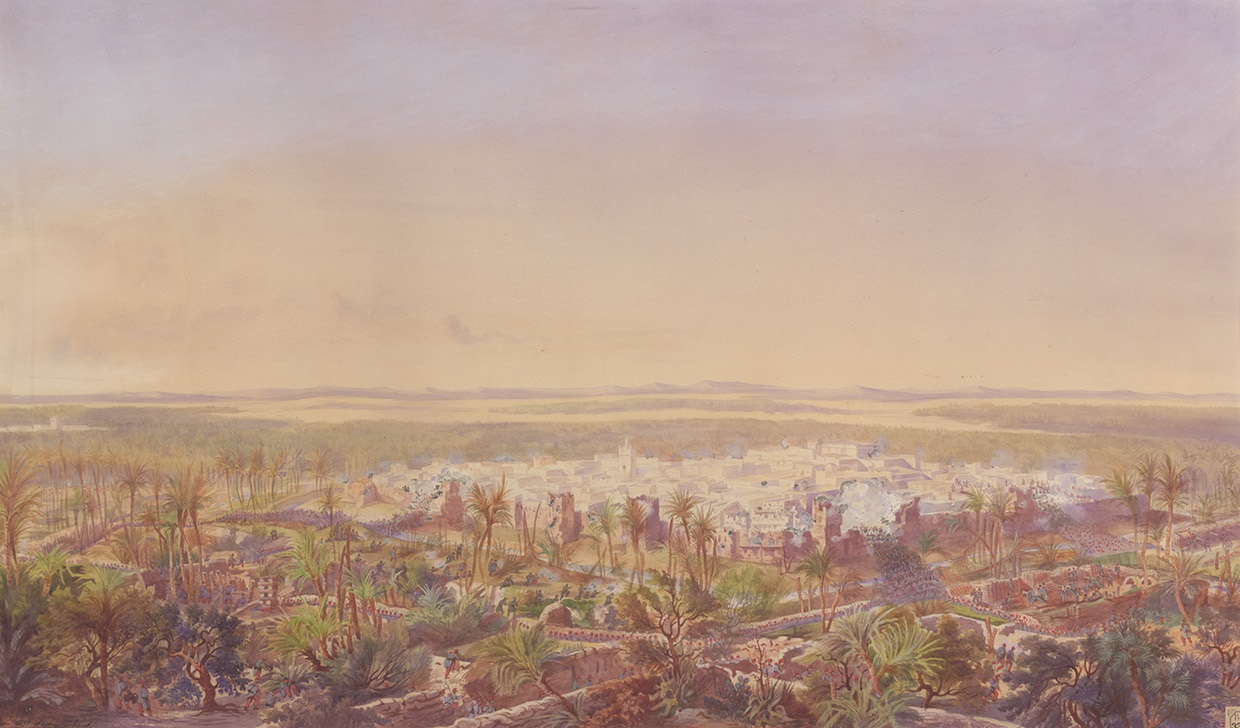
The Assault on Zaatcha, 26 November 1849

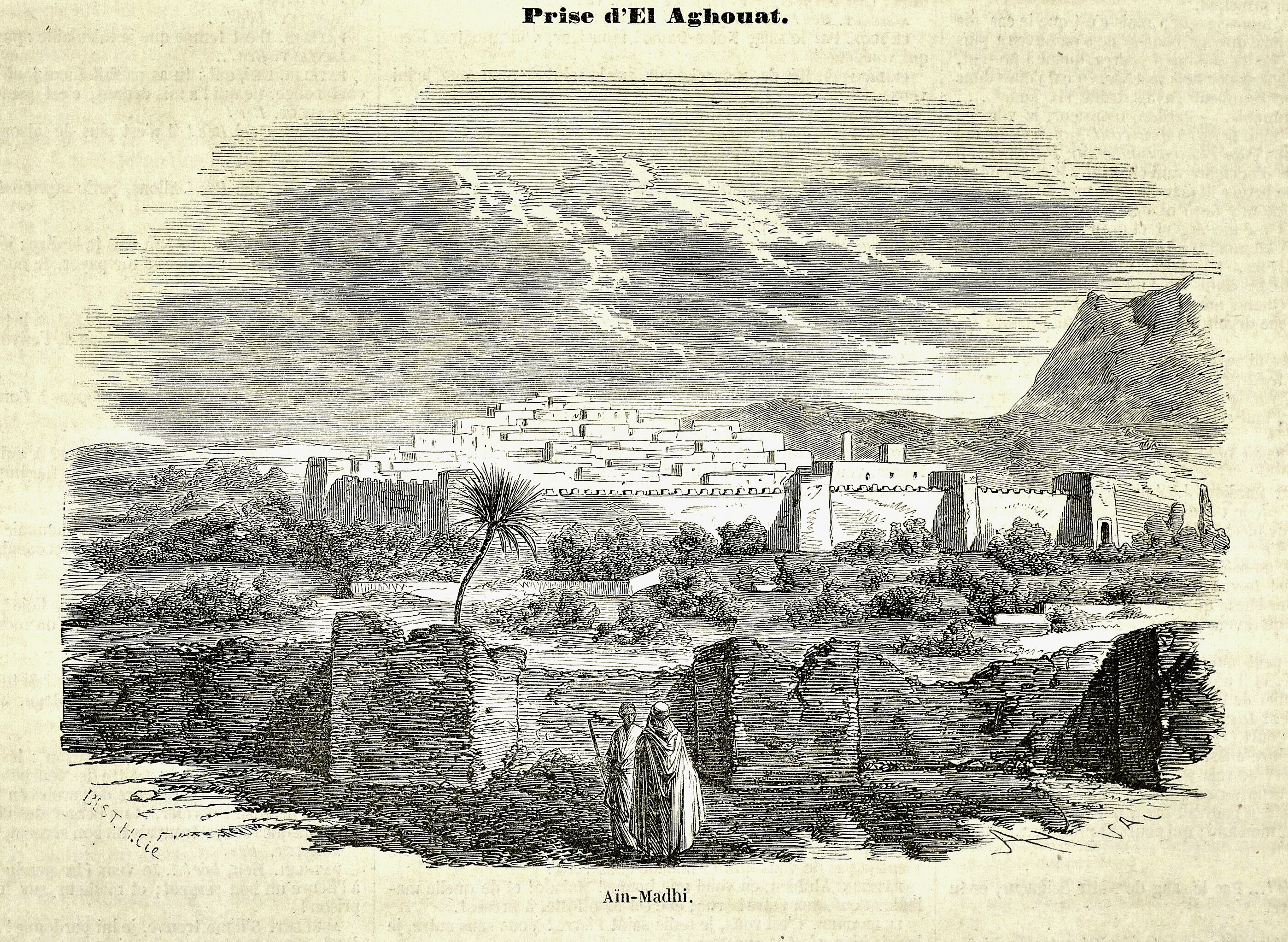
The capture of Laghouat in 1852

== See also ==
- Emirate of Abdelkader
- French Algeria
