= List of French governors of Algeria =

Governor of Algeria
- Gouverneur d'Algérie
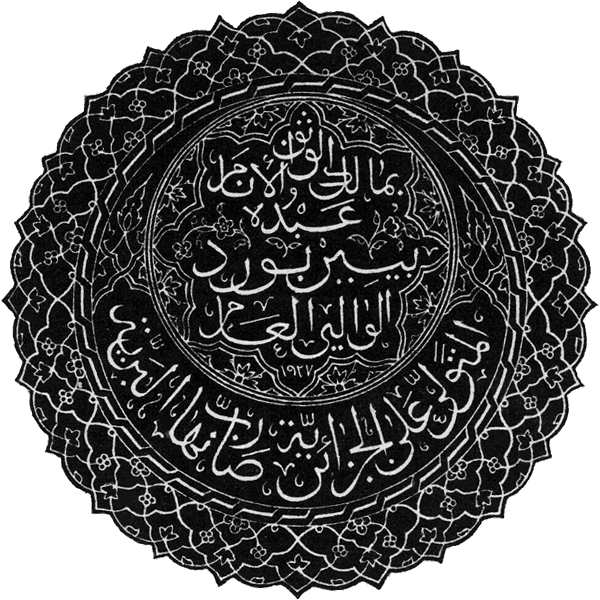
- Official Arabic seal of the Governor General of Algeria

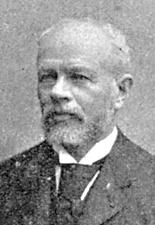
- Longest serving Louis Tirman; 26 November 1881 – 18 April 1891
- Reports to: Head of State of France
- Residence: Algiers: Dar Hassan Pacha; Government Palace
- Formation: 5 July 1830
- First holder: Count de Ghaisnes de Bourmont (as Military Commander)
- Final holder: Christian Fouchet (as High Commissioner)
- Abolished: 3 July 1962
- Succession: President of Algeria

Seal of the Government-General of Algeria under the Second French Empire, 1865

Seal of the Government-General of Algeria (1960s)

Chronological map of French Algeria's evolution, 1830–1962.

The following is a list of French governors of Algeria.

In 1830, in the days before the outbreak of the July Revolution against the Bourbon Restoration in France, the conquest of Algeria was initiated by Charles X as an attempt to increase his popularity amongst the French people. The invasion began on 5 July 1830. Afterwards Algeria would become a territory within the French colonial empire from 1830 to 1962, under a variety of governmental systems.

== List ==
(Dates in italics indicate de facto continuation of office)

=== French colony of Algeria (1830–1848) ===
Tenure	Incumbent	Notes	Portrait
5 July 1830 to 12 August 1830	Louis-Auguste-Victor, Count de Ghaisnes de Bourmont, Military Commander		
12 August 1830 to 20 February 1831	General Bertrand Clauzel, comte Clausel, Military Commander	1st term	
21 February/21 March 1831 to ?6/21 December 1831	General Pierre Berthezéne, Baron Berthezéne, Military Commander		
?6/21 December 1831 to 29 April 1833	Anne Jean Marie René Savary, duc de Rovigo, Military Commander		
29 April 1833 to 27 July 1834	Théophile Voirol, Baron Voirol, interim Military Commander		
27 July 1834 to 8 July 1835	Jean-Baptiste Drouet, comte d'Erlon, Governor-General of the French Possessions in Africa		
8 July 1835 to 12 February 1837	Bertrand, comte Clauzel, Governor-General of the French Possessions in Africa	2nd term	
12 February 1837 to 12/13 October 1837	Charles Marie Denys, comte de Damrémont, Governor-General of the French Possessions in Africa	Killed in combat during the siege of Constantine	
12/13 October 1837 to 11 November 1837			
11 November/1 December 1837 to 18 December 1840	Sylvain Charles, comte Valée, Governor-General of the French Possessions in Africa		
22 February 1841 to February 1842	Thomas Robert Bugeaud, Governor-General of the French Possessions in Africa		
February 1842 to 27 September 1847	Thomas Robert Bugeaud, Governor-General of Algeria		
1 September 1845 to 6 July 1847	Louis Juchault de Lamoricière, acting Governor-General of Algeria	For Bugeaud	
6 July 1847 to 27 September 1847	Marie Alphonse Bedeau, acting Governor-General of Algeria	For Bugeaud	
27 September 1847 to 24 February 1848	Henri-Eugène-Philippe-Louis d'Orleans, duc d'Aumale, Governor-General of Algeria		
24 February 1848 to 29 April 1848	Louis-Eugène Cavaignac, Governor-General of Algeria		
29 April 1848 to 9 September 1848	Nicolas Changarnier, Governor-General of Algeria		
20 June 1848 to 9 September 1848	Guillaume Stanislas Marey-Monge, acting Governor-General of Algeria	For Changarnier	
9 September 1848 to 4 November 1848	Viala Charon, Governor-General of Algeria		

=== French departments of Algeria (1848–1962) ===
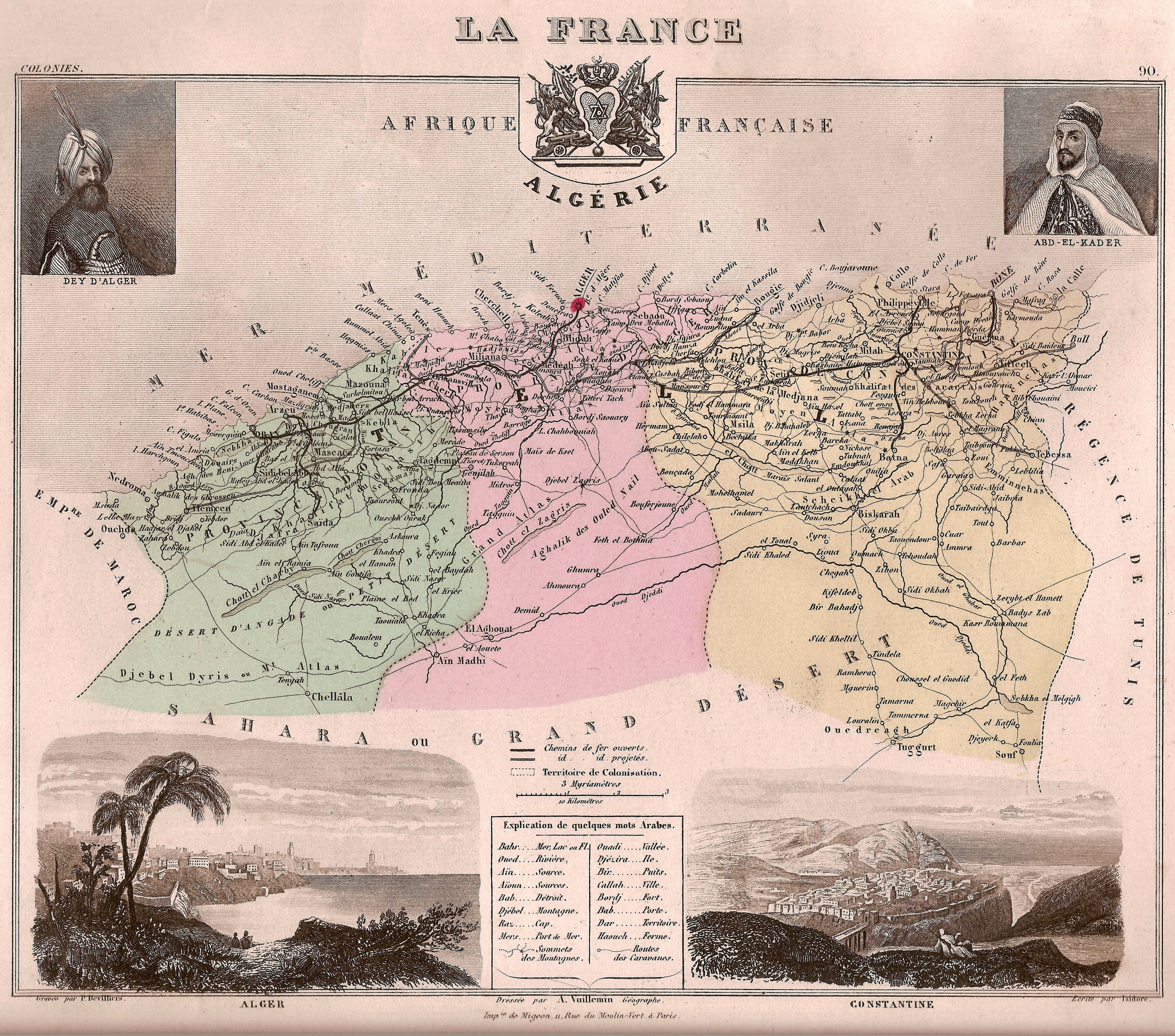
The three Algerian departments, 1848.

Shortly after the July Monarchy of Louis Philippe I was overthrown in the Revolution of 1848, the new government of the Second Republic ended Algeria's status as a colony and declared it in the 1848 Constitution an integral part of France. Three civil departements — Alger, Oran, and Constantine — were organized under a civilian government.

Tenure	Incumbent	Notes	Portrait
4 November 1848 to 22 October 1850	Viala Charon, Governor-General of Algeria		
22 October 1850 to 10 May 1851	Alphonse Henri, comte d'Hautpoul, Governor-General of Algeria		
10 May 1851 to 11 December 1851	Aimable-Jean-Jacques Pélissier, Governor-General of Algeria	1st term	
11 December 1851 to 31 August 1858	Jacques Louis Randon, Governor-General of Algeria		
24 June 1858 to 21 March 1859	Prince Napoléon-Joseph-Charles-Paul Bonaparte, Minister for Algeria and the Colonies		
21 March 1859 to 24 November 1860	Prosper, comte de Chasseloup-Laubat, Minister for Algeria and the Colonies		
24 November 1860 to 22 May 1864	Aimable-Jean-Jacques Pélissier, Minister for Algeria and the Colonies	2nd term	
22 May 1864 to 1 September 1864	Edmond-Charles de Martimprey, Minister for Algeria and the Colonies		
1 September 1864 to 27 July 1870	Patrice de MacMahon, duc de Magenta, Governor-General of Algiers		
27 July 1870 to 23 October 1870	Louis, Baron Durieu, Governor-General of Algiers		
23 October 1870 to 24 October 1870	Jean Walsin-Esterhazy, Governor-General of Algiers		
24 October 1870 to 16 November 1870	Henry Gabriel Didier, Governor-General of Algiers		
16 November 1870 to 8 February 1871	Charles de Bouzet, Prefect of Oran and Extraordinary Commissioner of the Republic		
c. November 1870 to March 1871	Romuald Vuillermoz, Mayor of Algiers and Head of the Committee of Defence	In rebellion	
8 February 1871 to 21 March 1871	Alexis Lambert, Prefect of Oran and Extraordinary Commissioner of the Republic		
21 March 1871 to 10 June 1873	Louis Henri de Gueydon, Governor-General of Algeria		
10 June 1873 to 15 March 1879	Antoine-Eugène-Alfred Chanzy, Governor-General of Algeria		
15 March 1879 to 26 November 1881	Albert Grévy, acting Governor-General of Algeria		
26 November 1881 to 18 April 1891	Louis Tirman, Governor-General of Algeria		
18 April 1891 to 28 September 1897	Jules Cambon, Governor-General of Algeria		
28 September 1897 to 1 October 1897	Henri-Auguste Lozé, Governor-General of Algeria		
1 October 1897 to 26 July 1898	Louis Lépine, Governor-General of Algeria		
26 July 1898 to 3 October 1900	Édouard Laferrière, Governor-General of Algeria		
3 October 1900 to 18 June 1901	Charles Jonnart, acting Governor-General of Algeria	1st term	
18 June 1901 to 11 April 1903	Paul Révoil, Governor-General of Algeria		
11 April 1903 to 5 May 1903	Maurice Varnier, acting Governor-General of Algeria		
5 May 1903 to 22 May 1911	Charles Jonnart, acting Governor-General of Algeria	2nd term	
22 May 1911 to 29 January 1918	Charles Lutaud, Governor-General of Algeria		
29 January 1918 to 29 August 1919	Charles Jonnart, acting Governor-General of Algeria	3rd term	
29 August 1919 to 28 July 1921	Jean-Baptiste Eugène Abel, Governor-General of Algeria		
28 July 1921 to 17 April 1925	Théodore Steeg, Governor-General of Algeria		
17 April 1925 to 12 May 1925	Henri Dubief, acting Governor-General of Algeria		
12 May 1925 to 20 November 1927	Maurice Viollette, Governor-General of Algeria		
20 November 1927 to 3 October 1930	Pierre-Louis Bordes, Governor-General of Algeria		
3 October 1930 to 21 September 1935	Jules Carde, Governor-General of Algeria		
21 September 1935 to 19 July 1940	Georges Le Beau, Governor-General of Algeria		
19 July 1940 to 16 July 1941	Jean-Marie Charles Abrial, Governor-General of Algeria		
16 July 1941 to 20 September 1941	Maxime Weygand, Governor-General of Algeria		
20 September 1941 to 20 January 1943	Yves-Charles Châtel, acting Governor-General of Algeria		
20 January 1943 to 3 June 1943	Bernard-Marcel-Edmond Peyrouton, Governor-General of Algeria		
3 June 1943 to 8 September 1944	Georges Albert Julien Catroux, Governor-General of Algeria	1st term	
8 September 1944 to 11 February 1948	Yves Chataigneau, Governor-General of Algeria		
11 February 1948 to 9 March 1951	Marcel-Edmond Naegelen, Governor-General of Algeria		
12 April 1951 to 26 January 1955	Roger Léonard, Governor-General of Algeria		
26 January 1955 to 1 February 1956	Jacques Soustelle, Governor-General of Algeria		
1 February 1956 to 9 February 1956	Georges Albert Julien Catroux, Governor-General of Algeria	2nd term	
9 February 1956 to 13 May 1958	Robert Lacoste, Governor-General of Algeria		
13 May 1958 to 1 June 1958	André Mutter, Governor-General of Algeria		
13 May 1958 to 23 May 1958	Jacques Massu, President of the Committee of Public Safety	In rebellion during the May 1958 crisis	
23 May 1958 to 7 June 1958	Committee of Public Safety:-	In rebellion during the May 1958 crisis	
23 May 1958 to 7 June 1958	Jacques Massu, President of the Central Committee of Public Safety	In rebellion during the May 1958 crisis	
23 May 1958 to 7 June 1958	Chérif Sid Cara, President of the Central Committee of Public Safety	In rebellion during the May 1958 crisis	
7 June 1958 to 12 December 1958	Raoul-Albin-Louis Salan, Delegate-general of Algeria		
12 December 1958 to 23 November 1960	Paul Delouvrier, Delegate-general of Algeria		
23 November 1960 to 19 March 1962	Jean Morin, Delegate-general of Algeria		
21 April 1961 to 25 April 1961	Directorate:-	In rebellion during the Algiers putsch of 1961	
21 April 1961 to 25 April 1961	Maurice Challe	In rebellion during the Algiers putsch of 1961	
21 April 1961 to 25 April 1961	André Zeller	In rebellion during the Algiers putsch of 1961	
21 April 1961 to 25 April 1961	Edmond Jouhaud	In rebellion during the Algiers putsch of 1961	
21 April 1961 to 25 April 1961	Raoul Salan	In rebellion during the Algiers putsch of 1961	
19 March 1962 to 3 July 1962	Christian Fouchet, High Commissioner		
3 July 1962 to 25 September 1962	Abderrahmane Farès, High Commissioner and Chairman of the Provisional Executive		

For continuation after independence, see: List of heads of state of Algeria

== See also ==
- Ottoman Algeria
  - List of Ottoman governors of Algiers
- French Algeria
- Pacification of Algeria
- Beylik of Tunis
- French protectorate of Tunisia
  - List of French residents-general in Tunisia
- Kingdom of Tunisia
- French protectorate in Morocco
  - List of French residents-general in Morocco

== Sources ==
- http://www.rulers.org/rula1.html#algeria
- African States and Rulers, John Stewart, McFarland
- Heads of State and Government, 2nd Edition, John V da Graca, MacMillan Press (2000)
