= Siege of Laghouat =

1852 siege of the French conquest of Algeria

- Part of the French conquest of Algeria
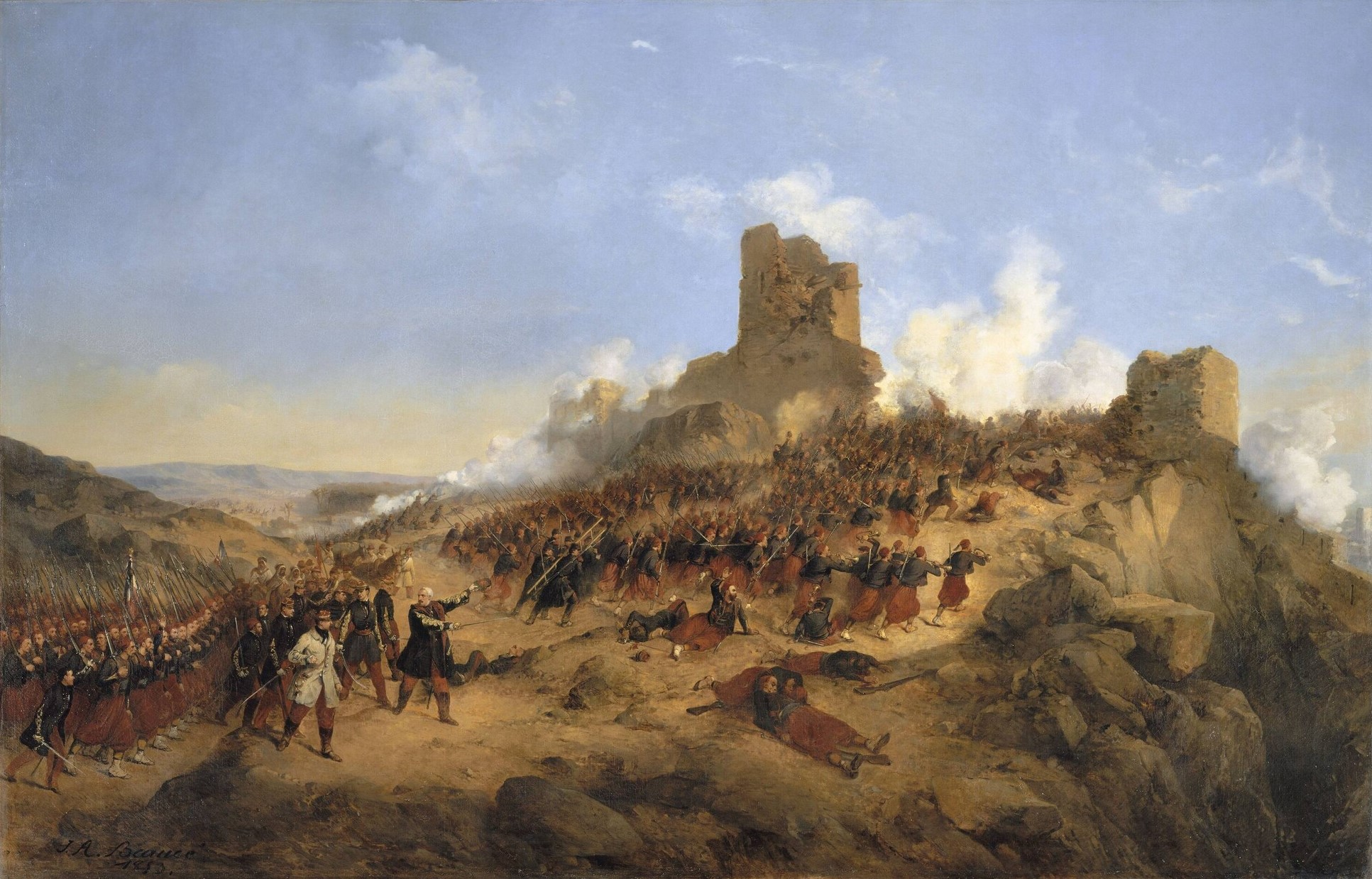
- Assault and capture of Laghouat, 2 December 1852; Jean-Adolphe Beaucé, 1853
| Date | 21 November – 4 December 1852 |
| Location | Laghouat, Algeria 33°48′00″N 2°53′00″E |
| Result | French victory |

Belligerents
| (Second French Empire) France | Laghouat resistance |

Commanders and leaders
| Aimable Pélissier | Ben Nasser ben Chohra |

Strength
| 6,000 | 4,500 |

Casualties and losses
| 2,000 | 2,500–3,000 Casualties |
- Location within Algeria

The siege of Laghouat in 1852 was an episode of the French pacification of Algeria.

== Background ==
At the end of 1852, Laghouat, an oasis in a strategically important location providing access to southern Algeria, became “a hotbed of unrest”. Mohammed ben Abdallah, a former ally of France, launched an armed revolt that gained some traction. Three columns, led by generals Aimable Pélissier, Joseph Vantini and Henri Pierre Bouscaren, intervened in Laghouat to suppress the revolt.

== Conflict ==
General Aimable Pélissier commanding an army of 6,000, besieged the city of Laghouat from 21 November until 4 December 1852, when the city capitulated. The brutal treatment of the inhabitants was part of the scorched earth tactic of the French army and one of the first instances of recorded use of chemical weapons on civilians.

The storming of Laghouat turned quickly into several days of massacres to punish the population that was treated as combating enemies. The battle also witness the several deaths on the French side including that of general Bouscaren, that added to the fervor of the French soldiers to want to take revenge on the population setting an example for other towns and cities throughout the south of Algeria. About two thirds (2,500 to 3,000 out of a total of 4,500 inhabitants remaining in the besieged city) including women and children were massacred.

The massacre left a deep trauma in the Laghouati population that endures to this day. The year when the city was emptied of its population is still known to the inhabitants of Laghouat as "the year of the Khalya", meaning "emptiness" in Arabic. It is also commonly known as "the year of Hessian sacks", referring to the way the captured surviving men and boys were put alive in sacks and thrown into trenches. Many reports of the battle were written by army chiefs and soldiers as well as visitors of the city after the massacre reported the morbid atmosphere of the city following the siege.

Surviving women were so afraid for their young sons of being collected by the French forces that they came up with a ruse to hide them. They dressed them as girls and put an earring on one ear. The tradition of protecting young boys from evil with an earring has survived until today.

The level of brutality of the massacre of Laghouat was a show of force as well as part of the long scorched earth tactic of the three French generals that took the fortified city. By ordering the massacre of the population, the French were eyeing all the remaining Saharian territories beyond Laghouat. During the battle of Laghouat several tribes and other city republics and fortresses delivered help to try to stop the advance of the French, namely Ghardaïa (and therefore the whole of the Mozabite confederation), Metlili, and Ouargla. The nobles of the latter cities, after witnessing or hearing of the atrocities committed in Laghouat, quickly sought a peaceful agreement to surrender their cities or sign treaties to keep their autonomy under the protection of France.

A few months after Laghouat, on 29 April 1853, general Randon, the French governor of Algeria, signed a treaty of protectorate with the nobles of the cities of M'zab, known in France as the capitulation of the Mzab.
