= Portrait of Marshal MacMahon =

Painting by Horace Vernet

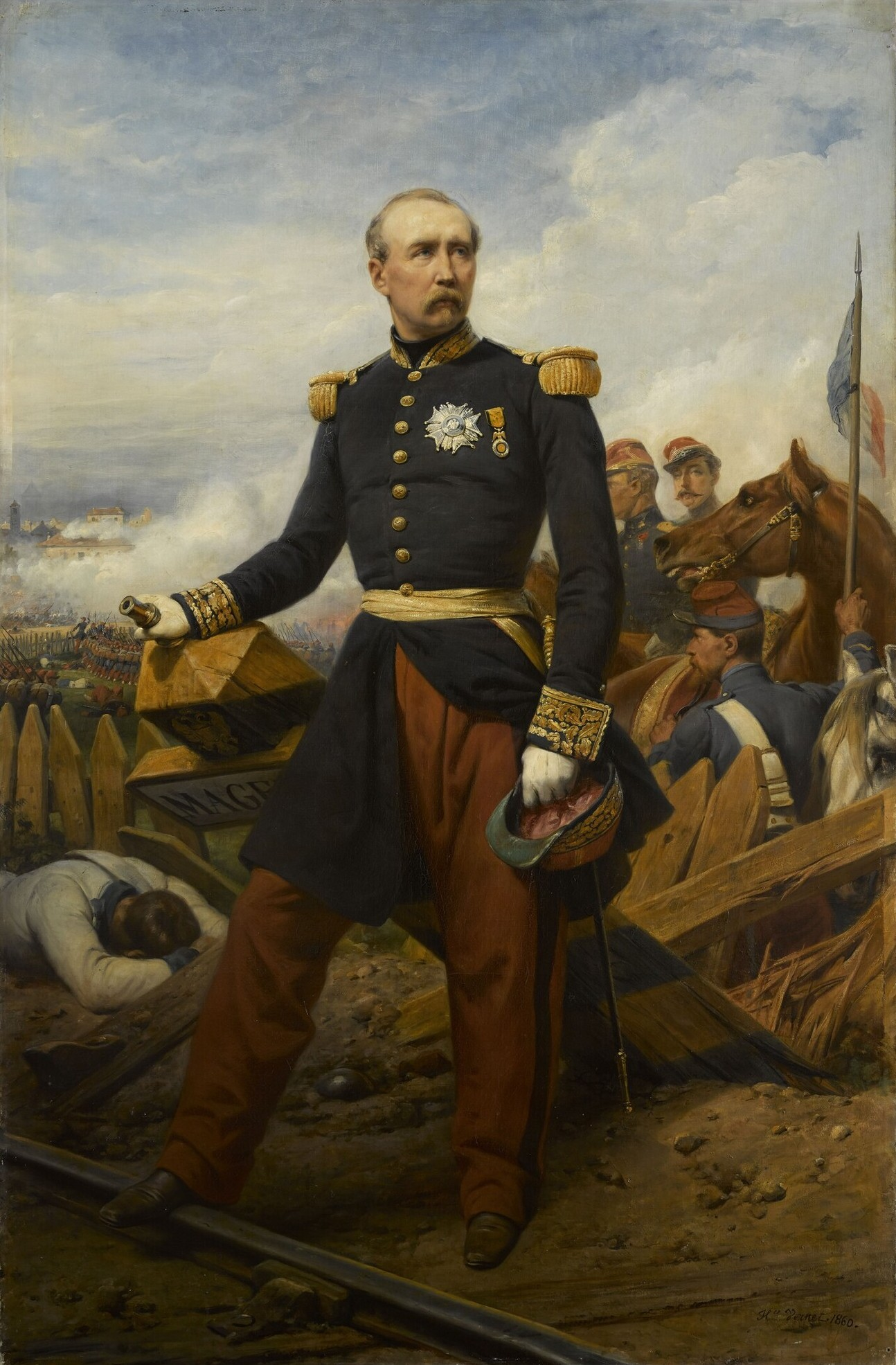
- Artist: Horace Vernet
- Year: 1860
- Type: Oil on canvas, portrait painting
- Dimensions: 215 cm × 140 cm (85 in × 55 in)
- Location: Palace of Versailles; Versailles

Portrait of Marshal MacMahon is an 1860 portrait painting by the French artist Horace Vernet. It depicts the soldier Patrice de MacMahon, a general during the Second French Empire. MacMahon had distinguished himself at the Battle of Magenta fought on 4 June 1859 during the Second Italian War of Independence. MacMahon was made Duke of Mangenta and a Marshal by Napoleon III. He is depicted at full-length in his uniform against the backdrop of the battle of Mangenta.

MacMahon was forced to surrender at the Battle of Sedan in 1870 during the Franco-Prussian War. He later became President of the Third Republic, serving from 1873 to 1879. Vernet was a veteran artist whose career stretched back to the rule of the first Napoleon and was noted for his battle scenes, and had produced a depiction of the Storming of Malakoff during the Crimean War for MacMahon birthplace of Autun in 1857.

This painting was commissioned by Napoleon III for the Musée de l'Histoire de France at the Palace of Versailles. It was the artist's last official commission before his death in 1863.

== Bibliography ==
- Harkett, Daniel & Hornstein, Katie (ed.) Horace Vernet and the Thresholds of Nineteenth-Century Visual Culture. Dartmouth College Press, 2017.
- Hornstein, Katie. Picturing War in France, 1792–1856. Yale University Press, 2018.
- Thoma, Julia. The Final Spectacle: Military Painting under the Second Empire, 1855-1867. Walter de Gruyter, 2019.
