= Viala Charon =

French soldier (born 1794)

Edme Viala Charon
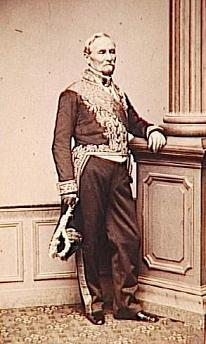
- Charon as a Senator of France

Governor General of Algeria
- In office 9 September 1848 – 22 October 1850
- Preceded by: Guillaume Stanislas Marey-Monge (acting)
- Succeeded by: Alphonse Henri d'Hautpoul

Senator of France
- In office 31 December 1852 – 4 September 1870

Personal details
- Born: 29 July 1794 Paris, France
- Died: 26 November 1880 (aged 86) Paris, France
- Occupation: Soldier

Edme Viala Charon, Baron Charon (29 July 1794 – 26 November 1880) was a French soldier who rose to the rank of Lieutenant General (General of Division). He was briefly Governor General of Algeria during the French Second Republic, and was a senator of France for most of the Second French Empire.

== Early years (1794–1814) ==
Edme Viala Charon was born in Paris on 29 July 1794. His father was a postal employee. As a young man he was described as having light brown hair, a long nose, blue eyes, medium mouth, cleft chin, oval face and a height of 1.67 metres (5 ft 6 in). He entered the École Polytechnique on 11 November 1811. On 8 October 1813 he was appointed Sub-Lieutenant of the Metz Army Engineers. Charon participated in the defense of Metz in 1814. On 23 May 1815 he was appointed Lieutenant of Engineers in the 6th Corps of the Army of the North, and in this capacity fought at the Battle of Waterloo on 18 June 1815.

== Bourbon and Orleans Monarchies (1815–48) ==
Charon was promoted to Captain in 1821. In 1823 he fought in the French invasion of Spain. He was appointed a Chevalier of the Legion of Honour on 30 October 1827. He was at the capture of Antwerp in 1832. He was made an Officer of the Legion of Honour on 14 January 1833. Charon was sent to Algeria in 1835, and on 31 December 1835 was appointed Battalion Commander. He commanded the engineers at Bougie, Oran and Algiers. He distinguished himself at Blida and in the expeditions of Cherchell, Miliana, Mascara, Cheliff, and the Flissas. He was promoted to lieutenant colonel on 22 January 1839 and to colonel on 2 June 1840. He was made commander in chief of the Engineers in 1841 and brigadier general on 24 June 1845.

== Second Republic (1848–51) ==
After the February Revolution of 1848 the government appointed Charon Director of Algerian Affairs on 6 June 1848, then General of Division and Governor General of Algeria on 9 September 1848. He replaced the acting governor Guillaume Stanislas Marey-Monge. Batna was the site of a military camp built by Governor General Aumale in 1844. On 19 August 1849 Viala laid the foundation stone for a city that was to be built in this location. In 2014 the stone had recently been destroyed during construction of a bus station.

Charon observed that Algeria had "two distinct societies", and it was necessary to accept that the "diversity of races and nations [constituted] different needs." He supported the Central Directorate's Project for the Organization of Muslim Public Instruction, although he felt it was a large concession to the Muslims and a temporary acceptance of the resilience of the indigenous cultures. In 1849 he wrote,

One of the first mysteries to breach is that which still surrounds the organization of the religious sects that we have seen constantly play the principal part in revolts since our conquests, and which by the solidarity that links their scattered members in all the Muslim countries are the most serious obstacle we must overcome to establish ourselves properly in this country.

On 24 December 1849 Charon told the Council of Government that the reports that Governor General Aumale had commissioned in 1847 had been "conceived in the most wise and liberal spirit," and confirmed that the "military chiefs who conquered Africa . . . were no less skillful ... in the labor of peace as in the art of war." Charon was appointed President of the Fortifications Committee on 11 March 1850. He was replaced as General commanding the XIX army corps (and Algerian military region) on 5 November 1850 by General Alphonse Henri d'Hautpoul. Charon was promoted to Grand Officer of the Legion of Honour on 2 December 1850.

On 16 April 1850 Charon married Elfride Schneider (1815–1862) in Paris. She was the daughter of Antoine Virgile Schneider (1779–1847), Chevalier de l'Empire, and Catherine, Countess Zalinska (ca 1795–1832). They had a son, Olivier Charon, Baron Charon (1851–1922).

== Second Empire and Third Republic (1851–80) ==
Charon cooperated with Louis-Napoléon Bonaparte's coup d'état of 2 December 1851. Charon was appointed President of the Consultative Committee on Algeria on 17 December 1851. On 31 December 1852 he was made a Senator of France. He was awarded the Grand Cross of the Legion of Honour on 31 December 1857. He was named Baron Charon by imperial decree of 3 February 1864. He was Senator until the senate was dissolved with the fall of the empire on 4 September 1870.

Charon died in Paris on 26 November 1880, at the age of 86.

== Sources ==
- Abi-Mershed, Osama (2010-05-10), Apostles of Modernity: Saint-Simonians and the Civilizing Mission in Algeria, Stanford University Press, ISBN 978-0-8047-7472-7
- CHARON Viala (in French), Arch. Nat. LH/493/25; Bibliothèque Ecole Polytechnique
- "CHARON, Viala", Léonore (in French), Ministry of Culture (France)
- Garric, Alain, "Edme Viala CHARON Le Général", Geneanet (in French)
- Ministere de la Guerre (1853), Annuaire militaire de l'Empire francais (in French), Veuve Berger-Levrault et Fils
- Murray-Miller, Gavin (2017), The Cult of the Modern: Trans-Mediterranean France and the Construction of French Modernity, U of Nebraska Press, ISBN 978-1-4962-0031-0
- Oulebsir, Nabila (2004), Les Usages du patrimoine: Monuments, musées et politique coloniale en Algérie, 1830-1930, Les Editions de la MSH, ISBN 978-2-7351-1006-3
- Robert, Adolphe; Cougny, Gaston (1889–1891), "CHARON (VIALA, BARON)", in Edgar Bourloton (ed.), Dictionnaire des Parlementaires français (1789–1889) (in French)
- Robert, Adolphe; Cougny, Gaston (1889–1891b), "MAREY-MONGE (GUILLAUME-STANISLAS), COMTE DE PÉLUSE", in Edgar Bourloton (ed.), Dictionnaire des Parlementaires français (1789–1889) (in French)
- Verdier, Marie (8 September 2014), "En Algérie, la capitale des Aurès se languit", La Croix (in French)
