= François Louis Alfred Durrieu =

French major general and Governor of Algeria

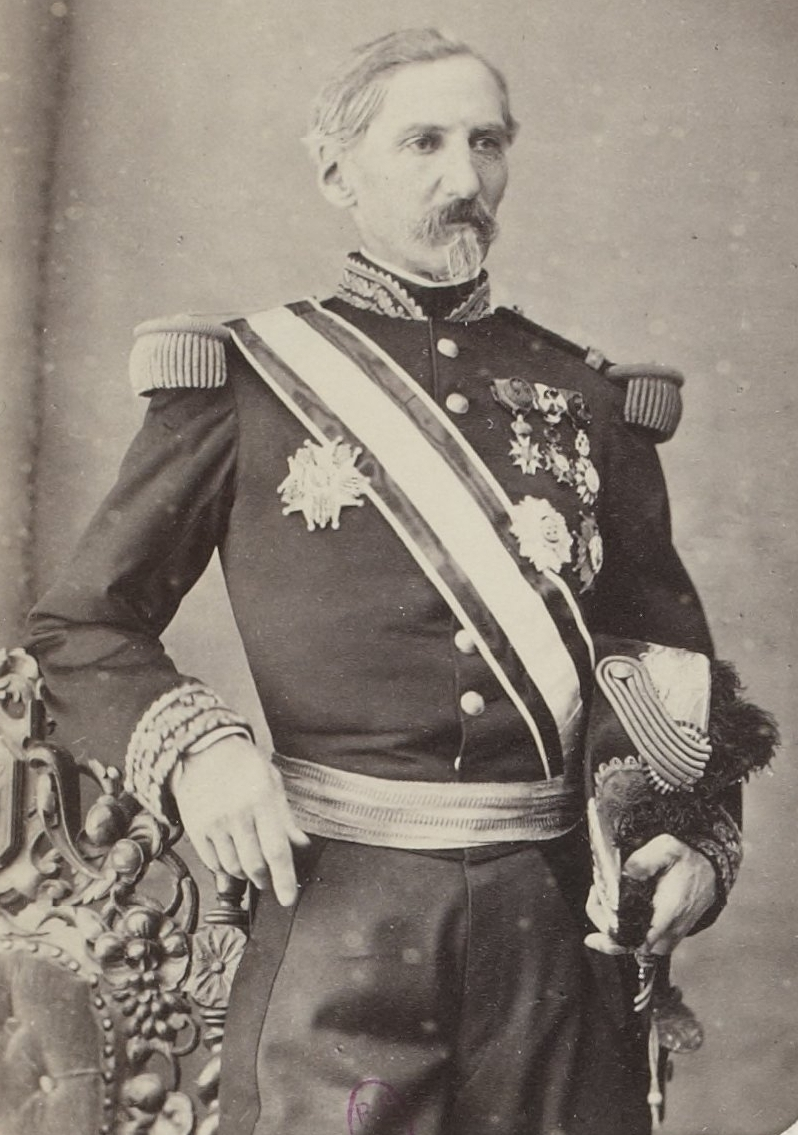
- Born: 18 January 1812 Hamburg, Bouches-de-l'Elbe, France
- Died: 27 September 1877 (aged 65) Paris, France
- Allegiance: France
- Branch: French Army

François Louis Alfred Durrieu (18 January 1812, Hamburg – 27 September 1877, Paris) was a French major general and Governor of Algeria.

He became Baron Durrieu in 1862, inheriting the title from his uncle General Antoine Simon Durrieu. He attended the military academy of Saint-Cyr. He became a captain in 1840 and was attached to do topographical work in Algeria. He was a squadron leader of Spahis in 1845, lieutenant colonel of the 1st Chasseurs d'Afrique in May 1849, colonel of the 2nd Spahis in July 1851, and was promoted to brigadier general on 29 August 1854. He received the command of the subdivision of Mascara, then was promoted to major general on 11 December 1859. He held the post of Deputy Governor of Algeria from 19 November 1866 until the abolition of that post on 24 October 1870.

He was governor of Algeria from 27 July 1870 to 24 October 1870.
