= Battle of Tachekkirt =

Battle during the French conquest of Algeria

- Part of French conquest of Algeria
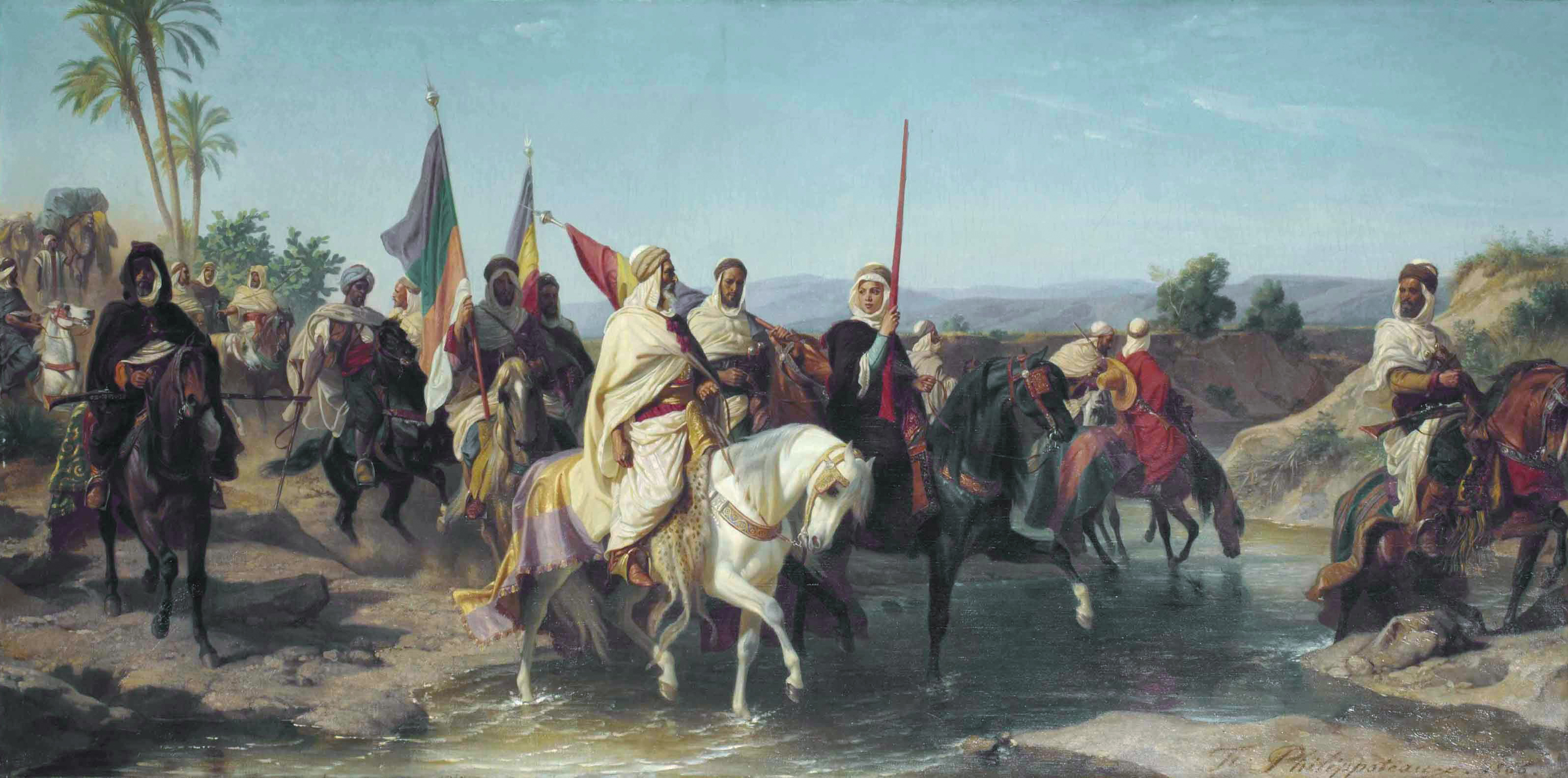
- Chérif Boubaghla and Lalla Fatma n'Soumer, by Félix Philippoteaux
Date	18 July 1854
Location	Kabylia
Result	Kabyle victory

Belligerents
France	Algerian resistance: Kabyle tribes

Commanders and leaders
Jacques Louis Randon	Sherif Boubaghla; Lalla Fatma N’Soumer

Strength
Unknown	Unknown

Casualties and losses
800 dead including 56 officers 371 injured	Unknown

The Battle of Tachekkirt was an 1854 battle between the French forces of Marshal Jacques Louis Randon and the allied Algerian forces of Lalla Fatma N'Soumer and Sherif Boubaghla.

The Algerian forces feared that the French would launch a surprise attack. Shortly after the appearance of Lalla Fatma N'Soumer and her reinforcements, composed of Kabyle warriors, they assumed strategic positions and lookouts were placed.

The battle took place on 18 July, and the Algerian tribes were victorious over the French army led by Marshal Randon. The French casualties were 800 dead, included 56 officers, and 371 injured. Marshall Randon was almost captured during this battle but managed to escape.

After the battle, Algerian commander Sherif Boubaghla was killed, most likely by the betrayal of his own allies, N'Soumer would take command of the remaining resistance.
