= Lalla Fatma N'Soumer =

Kabyle anti-colonial leader (1830–1863)

- Lalla Faḍma n Sumer
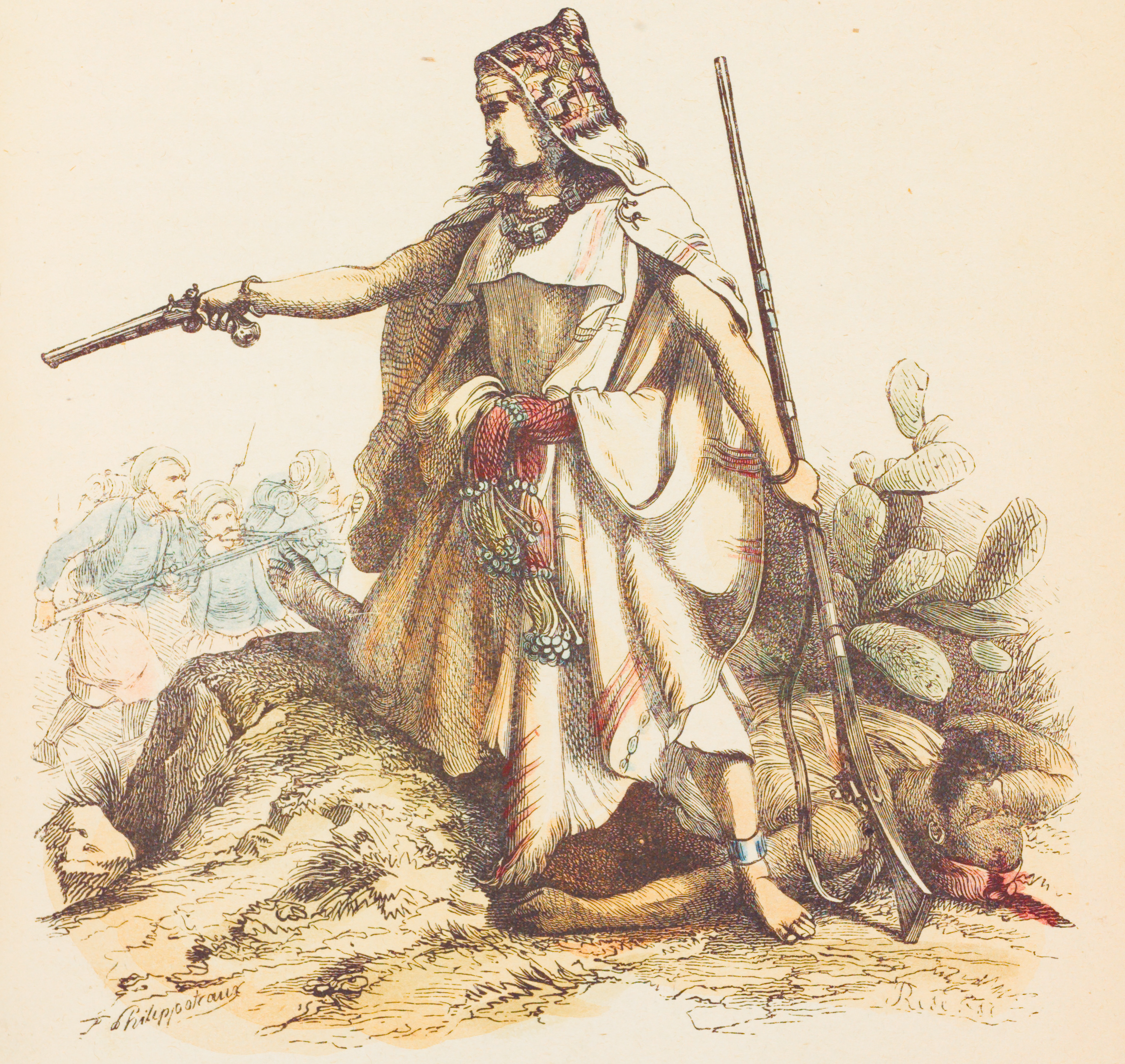
- "Femme kebaïle" by Henri Félix Emmanuel Philippoteaux, often used to illustrate N'Soumer
- Born: c. 1830; Werja, Abi Youcef, Tizi Ouzou, Algeria
- Died: 1863 (aged 32–33); Tablat, Médéa, Algeria
- Known for: Maraboutic resistance fighter against the French conquest of Algeria

Lalla Fatma N'Soumer (Kabyle: Lalla Faḍma n Sumer; Tifinagh: ⴼⴰⴹⵎⴰ ⵏ ⵙⵓⵎⵔ; c. 1830 – 1863) was a Kabyle anti-colonial leader during 1849–1857 of the French conquest of Algeria. She led several battles against the French forces, until her capture in July 1857. She was imprisoned until her death six years later.

== Name ==
Lalla, the female equivalent of the Berber word mass, is an honorific reserved for women of high social rank or for holy women. "N'Soumer" means "of Soumer", where Soumer was the village nearest the zawiya of her lineage, the Sidahmed. She sometimes bore the name "Lalla N'Ouerdja". Her birth name seems to have been "Fadhma Si Ahmed Ou Méziane", but she went by Fatma N'Soumer and eventually Lalla Fatma N'Soumer with time.

== Biography ==
Fadhma Si Ahmed Ou Méziane was born around 1830 to Sid Ahmed Mohamed and Terkia n'ath Ykhoulaf in what is now the commune of Abi Youcef, near Aïn El Hammam. As her last name suggests, she descended from the lineage of a respected marabout, Ahmed Ou Méziane, which gave her more influence than most women of Algerian society of the era. Her family would extend to 8 children: 5 brothers and 2 sisters. Fadhma's father was the head of a madrasa (Islamic school) linked to the zawiya of the Rahmaniyya order of Sufi Islam, originally founded by Sidi M'hamed Bou Qobrine in the late 1790s. As a result, Fadhma had access to more of an education than many children of the era. Around the age of 16–18 and with the approval of her older brother as head of the family after her father's death, Fadhma was put in an arranged marriage with a family cousin, Si Yahia n'ath Ikhoulaf. However, the couple quickly separated; she returned to her religious studies. Out of spite, her husband refused to grant her a divorce, making it impossible for her to remarry.

The territory of her birth and life is loosely called Kabylia, the land of the Kabyle people. The French conquest of Algeria began in 1830, the same year she was born. After successfully capturing Algiers the same year, the French focused on the coastal cities at first; Kabylia is mountainous and not easily accessible, with much of the land dominated by the Tell Atlas range of the Atlas Mountains. Growing French influence from their strongholds on the coast eventually reached the mountains, which saw violent resistance to French attempts to impose their authority there. While many Kabyle tribes and leaders engaged in raids and attacks on French positions and outposts as part of "jihad" before, mainly under the leadership of Mohamed ben Zamoum the region of Kabylia itself was only attacked in the 1830s.

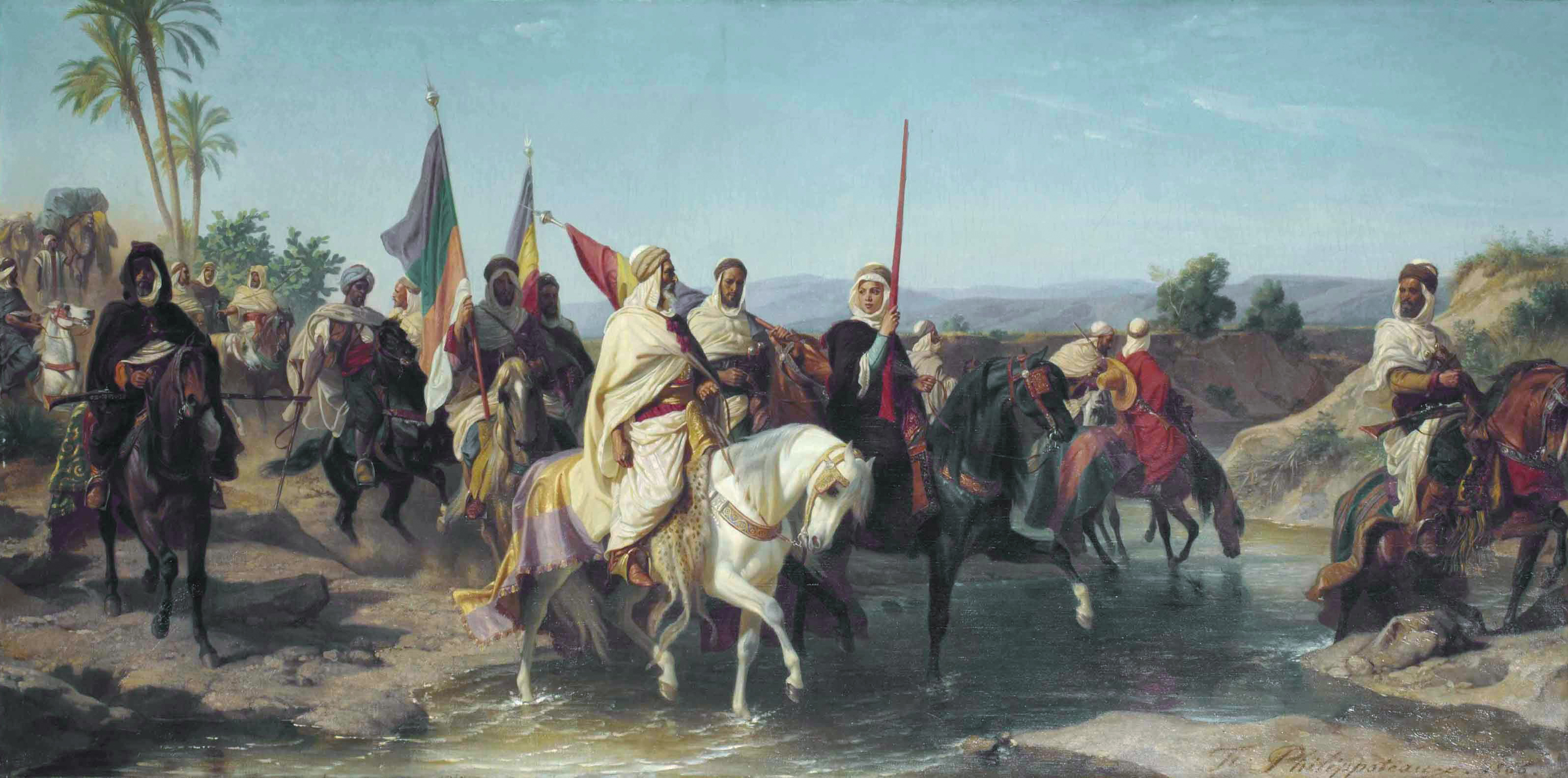
Sherif Boubaghla and Lalla Fatma n'Soumer (Philippoteaux, 1866)

Through the 1830s and 1840s, many Kabyle tribes (such as the Igawawen or the Iflissen Umellil) swore allegiance to the emirate of Mascara led by Emir Abdelkader, which's goal was to liberate and establish a modern Algerian state, these tribes would be defeated and the region of Kabylia penetrated in 1846-48. In 1849, a young Fatma entered the resistance and rallied to the cause of Si Mohammed El-Hachemi, a marabout who had waged an insurrection in the Dahra Range since 1847. There, she met Sherif Boubaghla, another Algerian rebel from the western region of Saida who would be another leader and ally in the following years. In 1850, Sherif Boubaghla started an anti-French rebellion in the Babor Mountains. A local assembly of Soumer, the tajmâat, also rebelled. They delegated leadership of the volunteer soldiers to Sidi Tahar (Fatma's brother) and Fatma herself, perhaps leading to the time when she began going by Lalla Fatma N'Soumer. The Soumer-focused rebellion was in the Djurdjura region of the Tell Atlas, and drew from several villages in the area such as Illilten.

Personal flag of Lalla Fatma N'Soumer

In mid-1854, a French incursion led by Charles Joseph François Wolff came to near N'Soumer's villages. The Battle of the Sebaou River then occurred at the Sebaou River near Aïn El Hammam. N'Soumer's forces were able to repel the French; allied cavalry led by Sherif Boubaghla were able to harass the retreating French, but French superiority in cavalry ensured they made their escape. The surrounding villages remained independent. Boubaghla was said to be quite taken with N'Soumer and to have obtained permission from her brother to court her, but her husband continued to refuse to grant a divorce, so the two stayed merely friends.

Another force led by Marshal Jacques Louis Randon arrived in the summer. The French were able to inflict significant damage along their line of march but were counterattacked by N'Soumer and her allied militia in skirmishes. The two sides fought a more decisive battle at the Battle of Tachekkirt, where Boubaghla and N'Soumer's forces emerged victorious. After the battle, the French and Kabyle came to terms and agreed to a ceasefire that would last for some years. Sherif Boubaghla died shortly afterward in late 1854, however, which raised Fatma N'Soumer and her brother in station as the leaders remaining.

The ceasefire eventually fell apart. Another French expedition was launched in 1857, led by General Patrice de MacMahon and Marshal Randon. In June 1857, Marshall Randon broke off and defeated a Kabyle village, occupying Aït Iraten following the Battle of Icheriden. Meanwhile, N'Soumer's forces fought a French detachment at the Battle of Chellata Pass; outnumbered and outgunned, they were defeated, and the area around modern Illoula Oumalou was secured. The remnants of Fatma's forces formed up in the hamlet Takhlijt Aït Aatsou, near the Tirourda Pass. However, it was over; while there may have been some fighting, the Kabyle surrendered to the French.

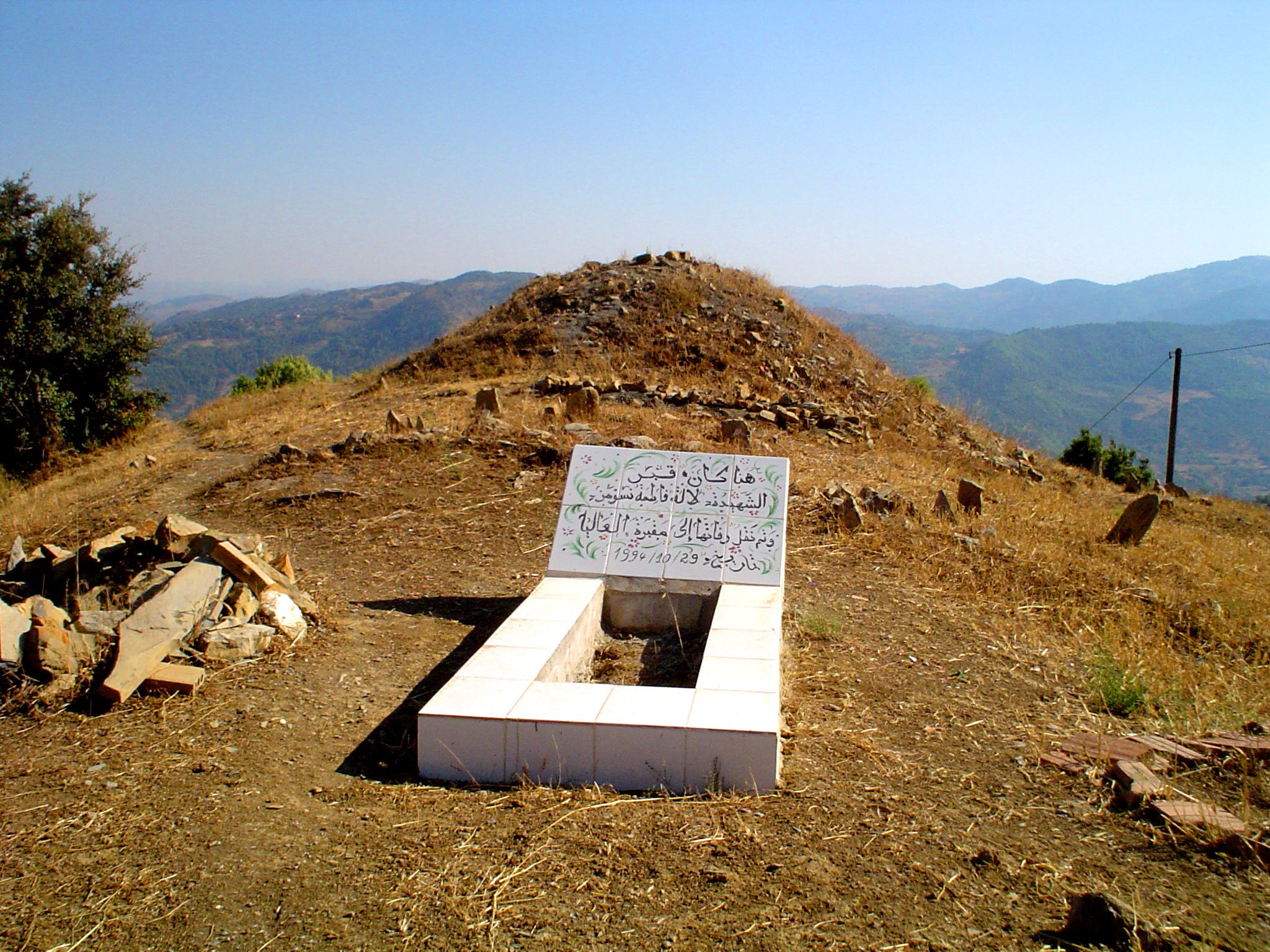
The tomb of Lalla Fatma N'Soumer

On 11 July 1857, Fatma was arrested by General Joseph Vantini ("Yusuf"), as were several of her brothers as well as other prominent Kabyle leaders. She was taken to Marshal Randon's camp and was imprisoned in the zawiya of El-Aissaouia, at Tablat. She was then placed under house arrest under the guard of Si Tahar ben Mahieddine. She died there in 1863, at the age of 33, afflicted by her incarceration and likely discouraged by the news of the death of her brother from disease in 1861. The other Kabyle leaders were eventually forced to surrender, and the French strengthened their control over the region.

== Legacy ==
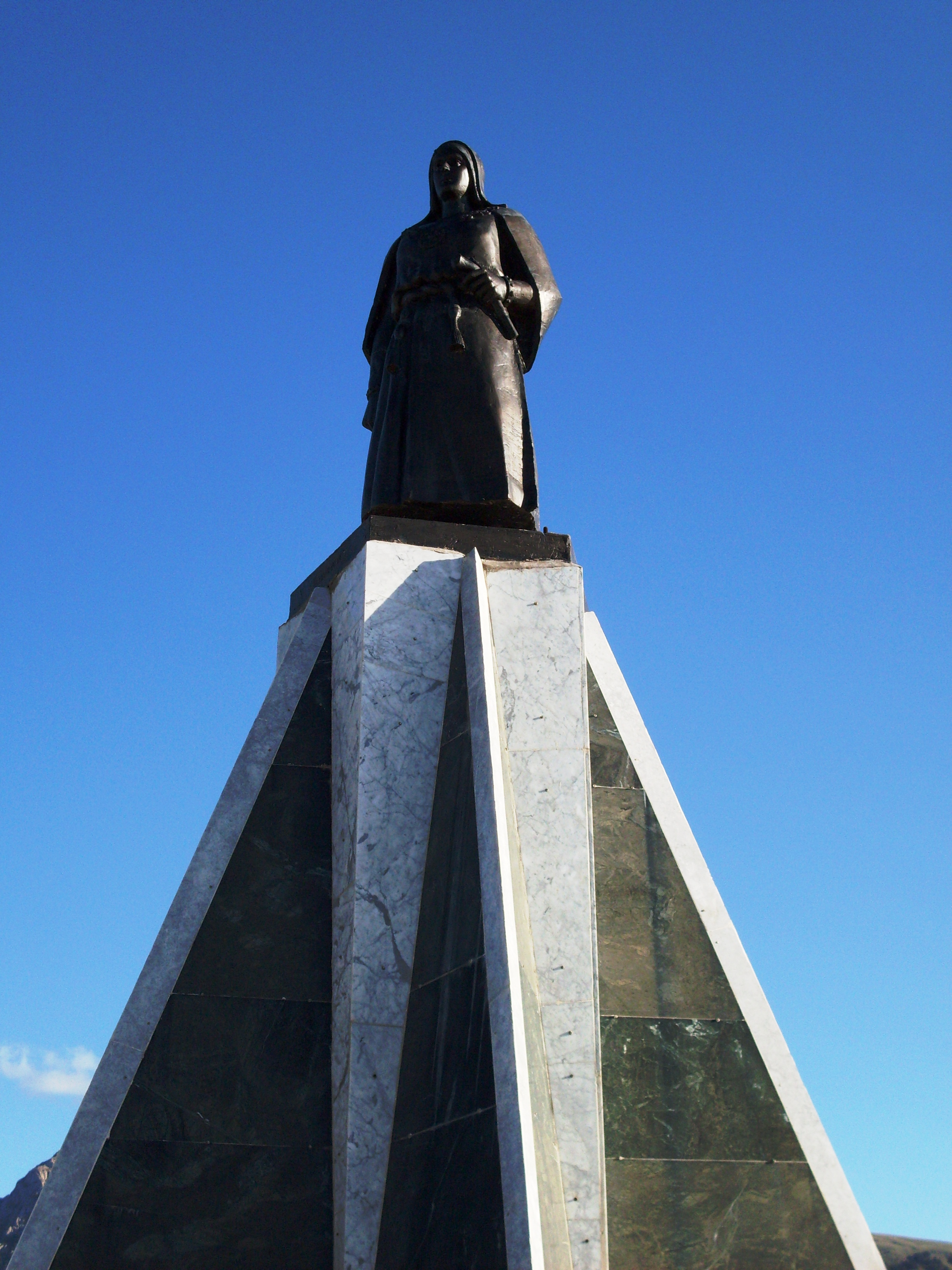
Statue of Lalla Fatma N'Soumer in Tizi Ouzou

Various legends spread about N'Soumer. Her disciples said she was gifted powers by God, including the abilities to see the future and cure illness.

The French explorer and writer Émile Carrey met with N'Soumer after her capture in 1857, and is one of the most important literary sources on N'Soumer. He wrote that she was beautiful, but overweight, and her size was the butt of jokes by the soldiers. He remarked that her capture was still remarkably effective; he wrote that "once she was in our hands, all resistance ceased, and our success was assured." The French also called her "La Jeanne d'Arc du Djurdjura" as a reference to Joan of Arc's role as a female religious and military leader; according to tradition General Yusuf gave her the title.

Lalla Fatma's grave remained a place of pilgrimage for the inhabitants of the region for some time. Her ashes were transferred in 29 October 1994 from the cemetery of Sidi Abdellah, near the zawiya Boumâali in Tourtatine, to Martyrs Square at the El Alia Cemetery in Algiers for notable national figures.

Her life has been documented in the movie Fadhma N'Soumer, directed by Belkacem Hadjadj and released in 2014. The lead role of Fatma N'Soumer was played by French actress Laetitia Eido.

In Algeria, a few statues of Lalla Fatma are on display, and a few schools and streets bear her name, notably a mixed-gender high school in Tablat, the city where she died.

== Sources ==
- Carrey, Émile. Récits de Kabylie. Campagne de 1857, Paris 1858
- Hanoteau, Adolphe. Poésies populaires de la Kabylie du Jurjura, Paris 1867
- Oussedik, Tahar. Lla Fat'ma N'Soumeur, Entreprise nationale du livre, 1986
- Bitam, Boukhalfa. Fadhma n'Soumer. Une autre lecture du combat de l'illustre fille de Werja, Draa Ben Khedda, Aurassi, 2000
