= Sherif Boubaghla =

Sharif Boubaghla
- الشريف بوبغلة
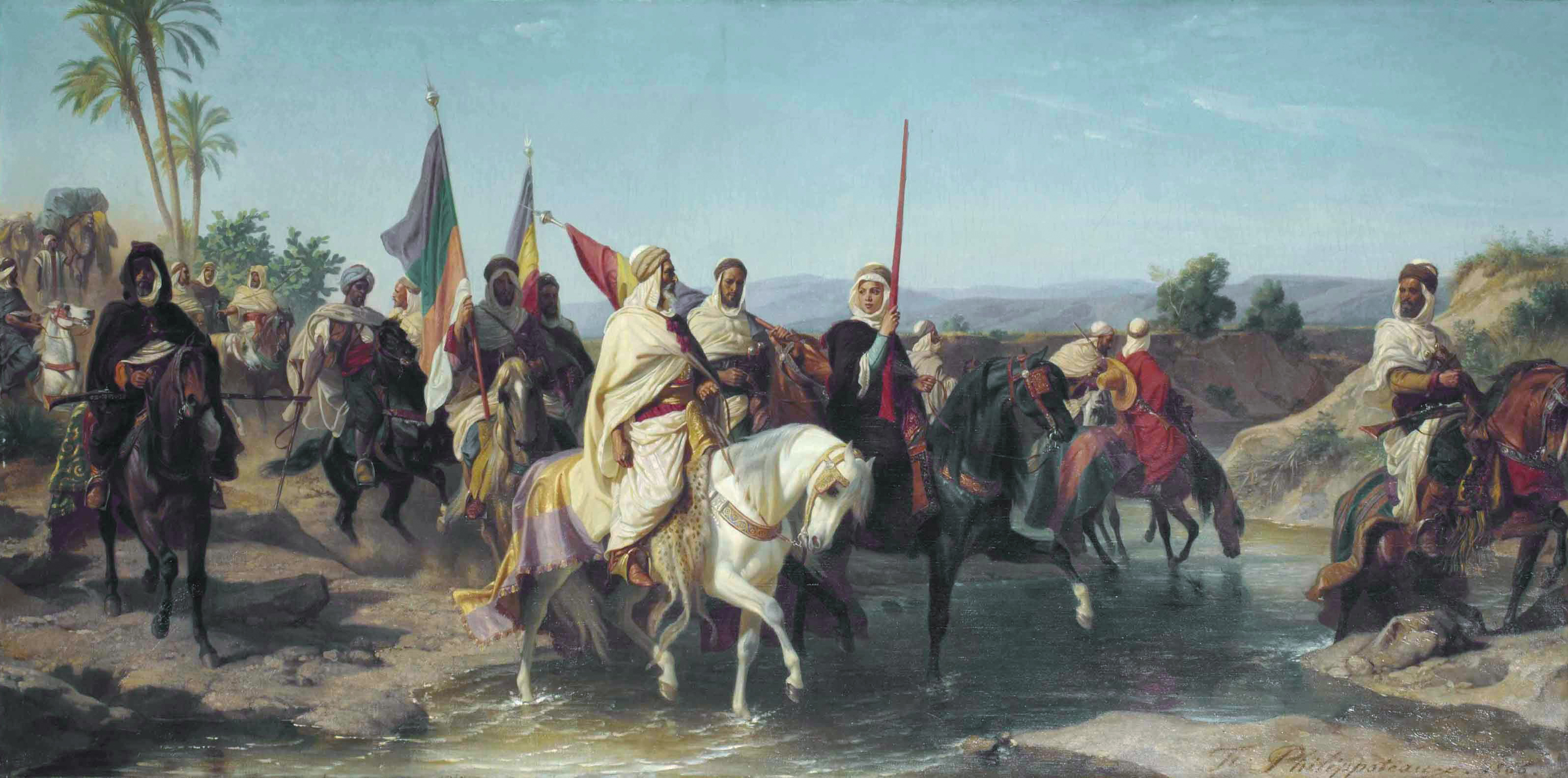
- Sherif Boubaghla and Lalla Fatma N'Soumer by Félix Philippoteaux
- Born: Muhammad Al-Amjad bin Abd Almalik; ~1820; Saïda, Algeria
- Died: December 1854
- Burial place: El Alia Cemetery
- Military career
- Allegiance: Emirate of Abdelkader; 1832–1847; Dahra revolt 1847–1850; Kabylia revolt 1850–1854
- Service years: 183?–1854
- Conflicts: French conquest of Algeria: Battle Of The Sebaou River (1854); Battle of Tachekkirt

Sherif Boubaghla or Cherif Boubaghla (in Arabic: الشريف بوبغلة, the man with the mule) (full name Muhammad Al-Amjad bin Abd Almalik محمد الأمجد بن عبد المالك) was an Algerian military resistance leader who led a struggle against the French colonial invasion in the mid-19th century. He participated in a wide variety of Algerian resistance movements and rebellions against the French army.

== Biography ==
Not much is known of Boubaghla's early life. He was likely born around 1820, although he may have been born earlier. He was born in Western Algeria, likely around the region of Saïda. His birth name was "Muhammad al-Amjad ben Abd al-Malek". He was born into a family of Islamic scholars. In 1830, the French invaded Algiers and began the French conquest of Algeria. In 1832, Abdelkader ben Muhieddiene declared a jihad to stop the French conquest and to re-establish an independent Algerian state, and established his emirate and center of resistance around Mascara. Sherif Boubaghla joined Abdelkader's resistance at an unknown date, and became an officer in his army. After Abdelkader was forced to capitulate to French forces in 1847, Boubaghla refused to surrender, and joined Si-Muhammad al-Hashemi's resistance in the Dahra Range. It is there that he would come to know Lalla Fatma N'Soumer whom he would start courting, however, as her husband, despite being estranged, would not grant her divorce, they remained platonic friends. He retreated into the well-protected and still mostly unconquered region of Kabylia in 1850, and began organizing resistance there. From his bases in Kabylia he launched raids against French colonial outposts and units. In 1854, the French decided to launch a campaign against the region, however Lalla Fatma's Kabyle tribes, with the help of Boubaghla's warriors, would inflict a defeat upon the French in the Battle of the Sebaou River, who while being heavily harassed by Boubaghla's cavalry, were forced to retreat from the area. Later that year in July, the French were yet again defeated by Boubaghla's and Fatma's forces at the Battle of Tachekkirt.

== Death ==
On December 21, 1854, Cherif Boubaghla was wounded by an Algerian spy who was working for France. He fell on muddy ground, then the spy killed him and cut his head and took it to the French ruler of Bordj Bou Arréridj Province. The French ruler fixed the head of Cherif Boubaghla to a pole to let the Algerian people see it. After this, the French took the head to France.

== Return of his skull from France ==
On 3 July 2020, Algeria received from France the remaining skulls of 24 resistance Algerian anti-colonial fighters. Among these, was the skull of Sheikh Bouzian and the skull of resistance leader Mohammed Lamjad ben Abdelmalek, also known as Cherif Boubaghla.

== See also ==
- Invasion of Algiers in 1830
- Abdelkader al-Jazairi
- Cheikh Bouamama
- Mokrani Revolt
- Algerian War
