= Jacques Louis Randon =

French military and political leader (1795–1871)

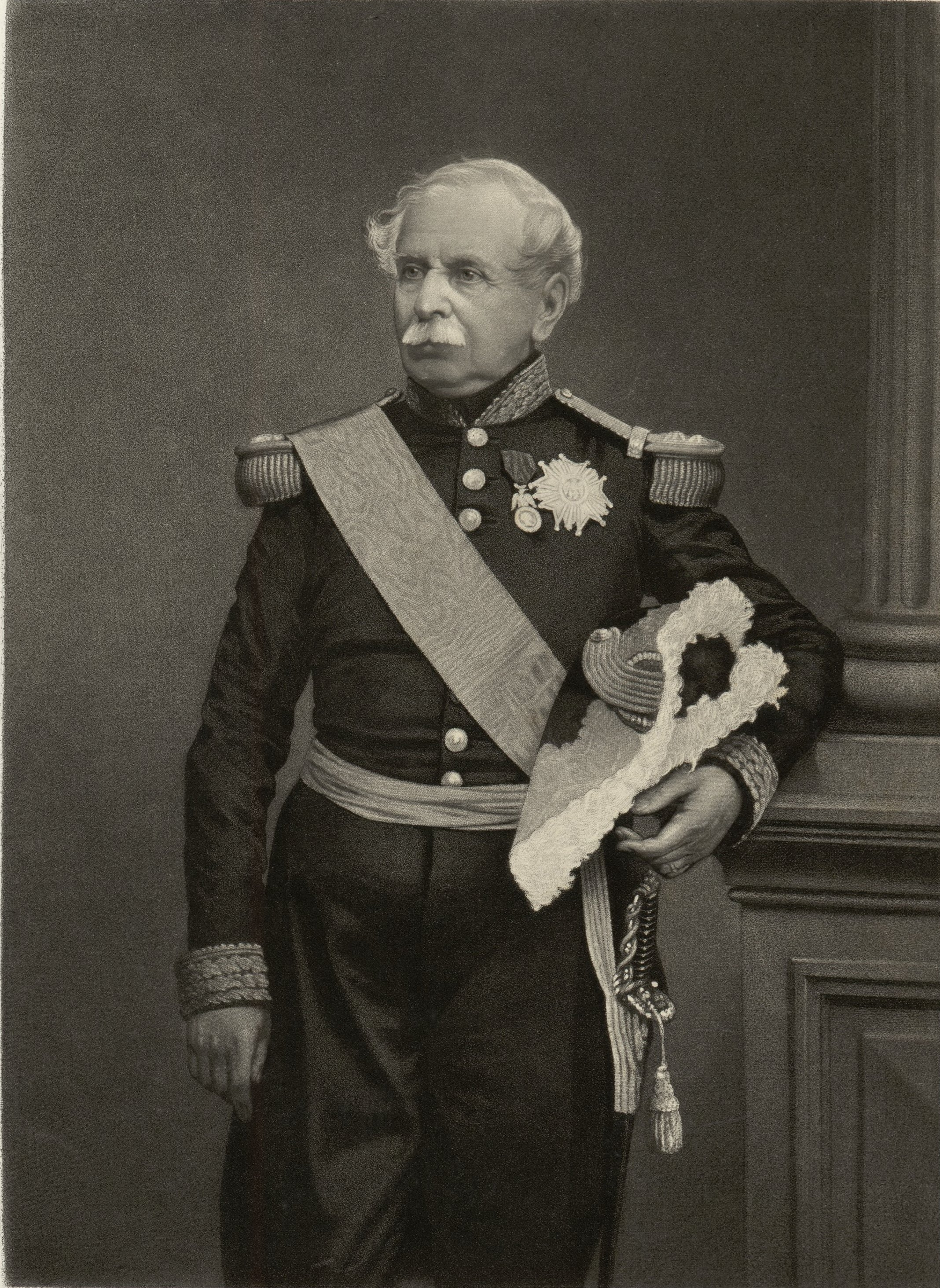
- Born: 25 March 1795; Grenoble, Dauphiné, France
- Died: 16 January 1871 (aged 75); Geneva, Switzerland
- Spouse(s): Clotilde Périer, Zénaïde Suin
- Military career
- Allegiance: France
- Branch: French Army
- Rank: Général de division
- Conflicts: Napoleonic Wars; Franco-Austrian War; Pacification of Algeria
- Awards: Marshal of France; Grand Croix of the Legion of Honor

Minister of War of France
- In office 24 January – 26 October 1851
- President: Louis Napoleon Bonaparte
- Prime Minister: Louis Napoleon Bonaparte; Léon Faucher
- Preceded by: Auguste Regnaud de Saint-Jean d'Angély
- Succeeded by: Jacques Leroy de Saint-Arnaud
- In office 5 May 1859 – 20 January 1867
- Monarch: Napoleon III
- Preceded by: Jean-Baptiste Philibert Vaillant
- Succeeded by: Adolphe Niel

Governor-General of Algeria
- In office 11 December 1851 – 31 August 1858
- Monarch: Napoleon III
- President: Louis Napoleon Bonaparte
- Prime Minister: Louis Napoleon Bonaparte
- Minister of the Navy and Colonies: Théodore Ducos; Auguste-Nicolas Vaillant; Prosper de Chasseloup-Laubat; Hippolyte Fortoul; Ferdinand-Alphonse Hamelin
- Preceded by: Aimable Pélissier
- Succeeded by: Prince Napoléon-Jérôme Bonaparte (as Minister for Algeria and the Colonies)

Jacques Louis César Alexandre Randon, 1st Count Randon (French: [ʒak lwi ʁɑ̃dɔ̃]; 25 March 1795 – 16 January 1871) was a French military and political leader, also Marshal of France and governor of Algeria.

== Early life ==
He was born at Grenoble in Dauphiné, of a Protestant family. Later in life he converted to Catholicism, under the influence of his second wife. He was a nephew of General Jean-Gabriel, Count Marchand, Also a Revolutionary Antoine-Joseph Barnave was a first cousin of his mother.

He enlisted in the French Army at sixteen, joined his uncle Marchand in Warsaw and was promoted to sergeant on 11 April 1812. He took part in the Russian Campaign, the taking of Moscow and the retreat back. He then fought in Napoleon's campaigns in Germany and France, notably at the battles of Lützen, Bautzen and Leipzig.

== Middle life ==
He was Minister of War from January to October 1851, after which he was appointed Governor-General of Algerie (11 December 1851 to 31 August 1858). Although initially not in favour of the coup of December 1851, he finally rallied the Second French Empire. He was made a Count in 1852 (by reversion of the title of his uncle General Marchand), and Marshal of France in 1856, at the same time as Canrobert and Bosquet. He served again as Minister of War from 1859 to 1867.

In 1859, botanist Ernest Saint-Charles Cosson published Randonia, a monotypic genus of flowering plant from North Africa, belonging to the family Resedaceae and was named in Jacques Louis Randon's honour.

== Later life ==
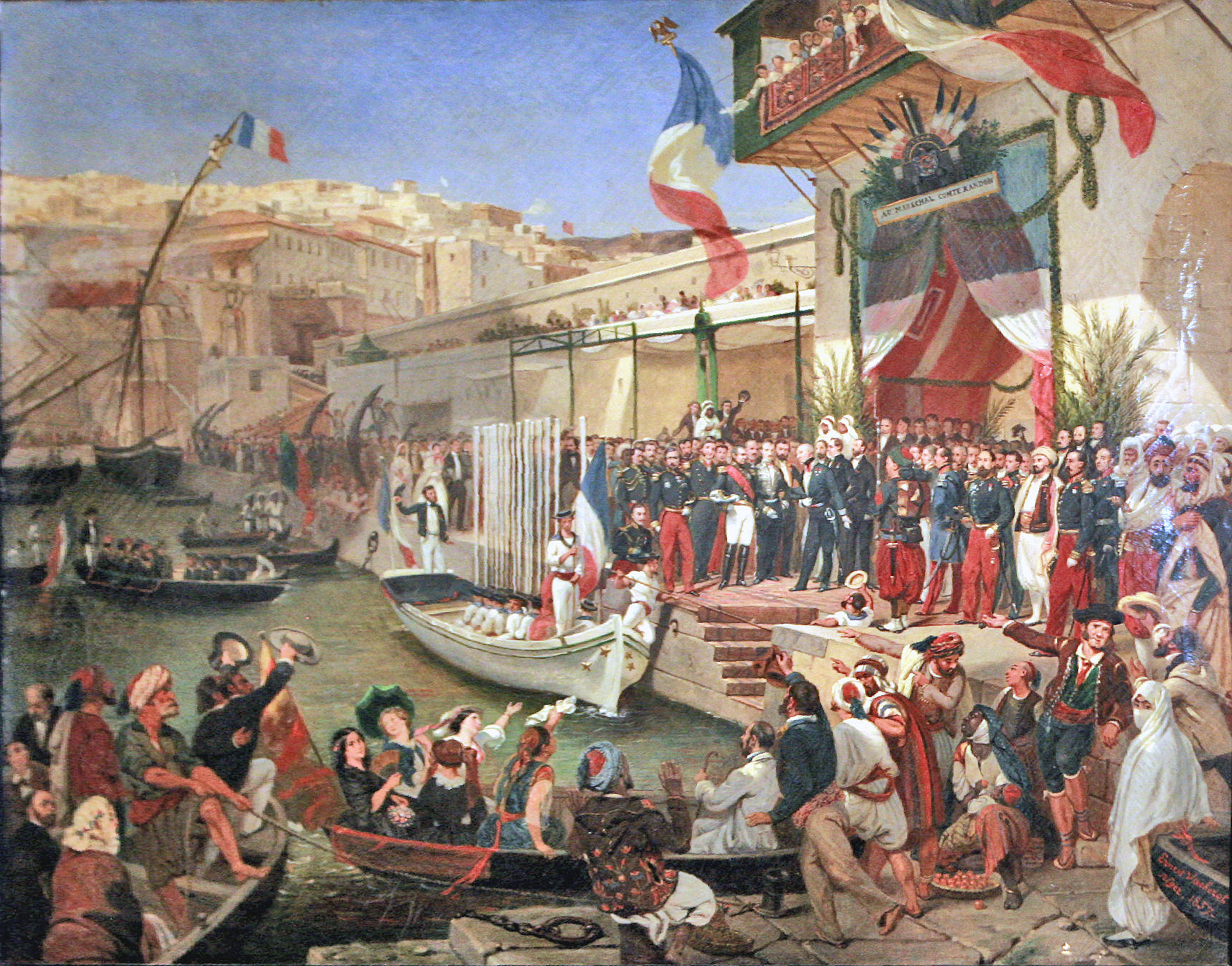
Arrival of Marshal Randon in Algiers in 1857

He received no command during the Franco-Prussian War in 1870, because of his high age. He was nevertheless accused to have a part of responsibility in French defeat for having neglected to prepare for it during his second ministry and for having dissuaded Napoleon III of acting in favour of Austria at the time of the Battle of Sadova in 1866. Modern research has shown that the latter accusation is unfounded and that, quite contrarily, Randon had advocated an immediate action against Prussia.

Randon died on 16 January 1871 in Geneva, leaving one surviving daughter.

The Marshal's first wife, Clotilde Périer, was a sister of Casimir Périer, who had been President of the Council during the July Monarchy and the grandfather of Jean Casimir-Périer, President of the French Republic. Marshal Randon later remarried to Zénaïde Suin.
