= Aimable Pélissier =

French military officer (1794–1864)

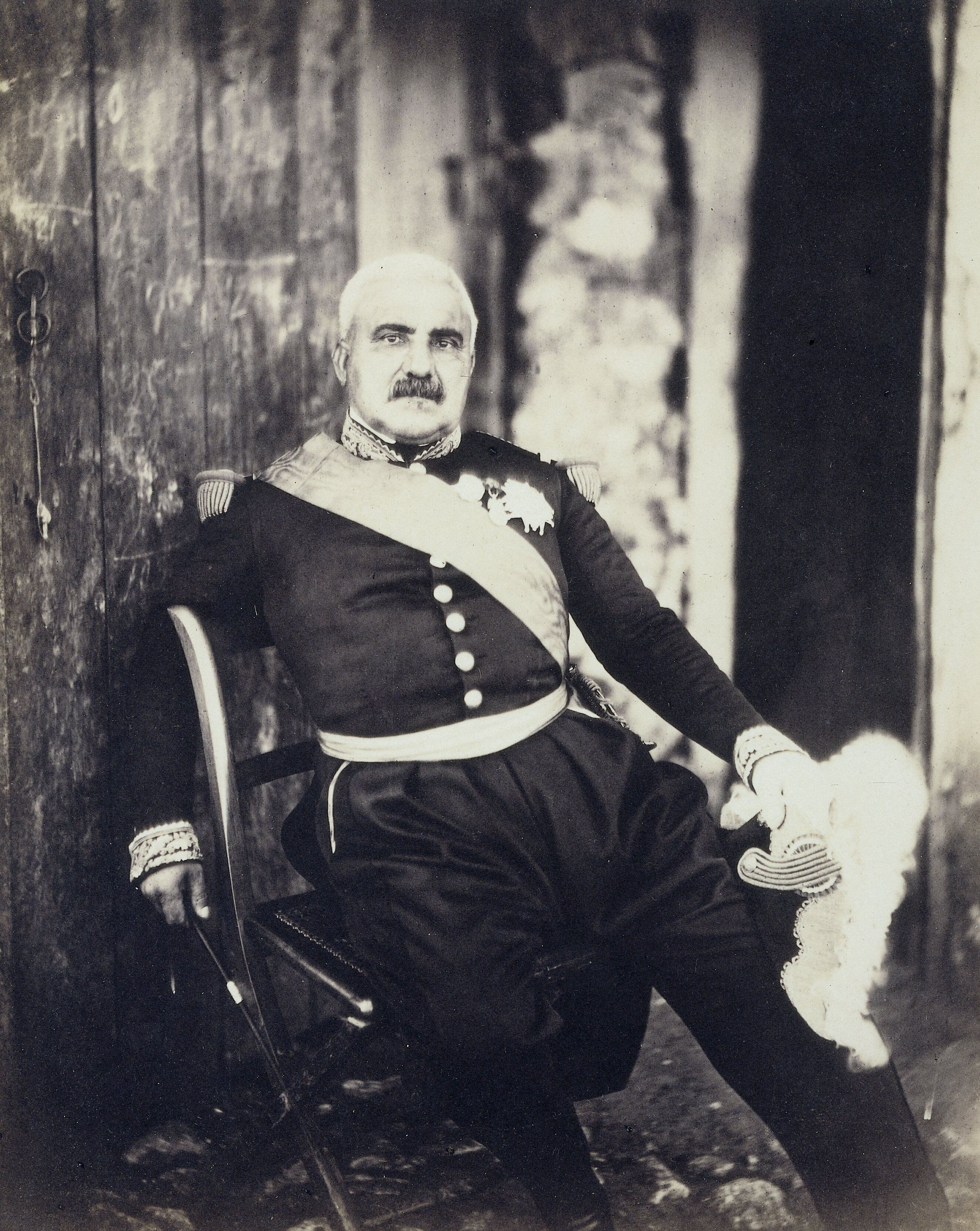
- Pélissier in c. 1855
- Born: 6 November 1794; Maromme, France
- Died: 22 May 1864 (aged 69); Algiers, Algeria
- Military career
- Allegiance: Bourbon Restoration; July Monarchy; French Second Republic; Second French Empire
- Branch: French Army
- Service years: 1818–1864
- Rank: Maréchal de France
- Conflicts: Spanish Campaign; Conquest of Algeria; Crimean War; Battle of the Chernaya
- Awards: Legion of Honour (Grand Chancelier)

Aimable-Jean-Jacques Pélissier, 1st Duc de Malakoff (French: [ɛmabl pelisje]; 6 November 1794 – 22 May 1864), was a Marshal of France. He served in Algeria where he became widely known for his cruel conduct and extermination of entire tribes. He also served elsewhere, and as a general commanded the French forces in the Crimean War.

== Biography ==
Pélissier was born at Maromme (Seine Inférieure), of a family of prosperous artisans, his father being employed in a powder-magazine. After attending the military college of La Flèche and the special school of St Cyr, he entered the army in 1815 as second-lieutenant in an artillery regiment. Brilliant examination results in 1819 secured his appointment to the staff. He served as aide-de-camp in the Spanish campaign of 1823, and in the Morea expedition 1828–1829. In 1830, he took part in the expedition to Algeria, and on his return was promoted to the rank of chef d'escadron.

After some years of staff service in Paris, he was again sent to Algeria as chief of staff of the province of Oran with the rank of lieutenant-colonel, and remained there until the Crimean War, taking a leading part in many important operations. However, the severity of his conduct in suffocating the whole Ouled Riah tribe in the Dahra or Dahna caves, near Mostaganem, where they had taken refuge (18 June 1845), aroused such indignation in Europe that Marshal Soult, the minister of war, publicly expressed his regret; but Marshal Bugeaud, the governor-general of Algeria, not only approved, but secured for Pélissier the rank of général de brigade (Brigadier-General), which he held until 1850, when he was promoted to général de division (Major-General). In 1852 he successfully commanded the Siege of Laghouat.

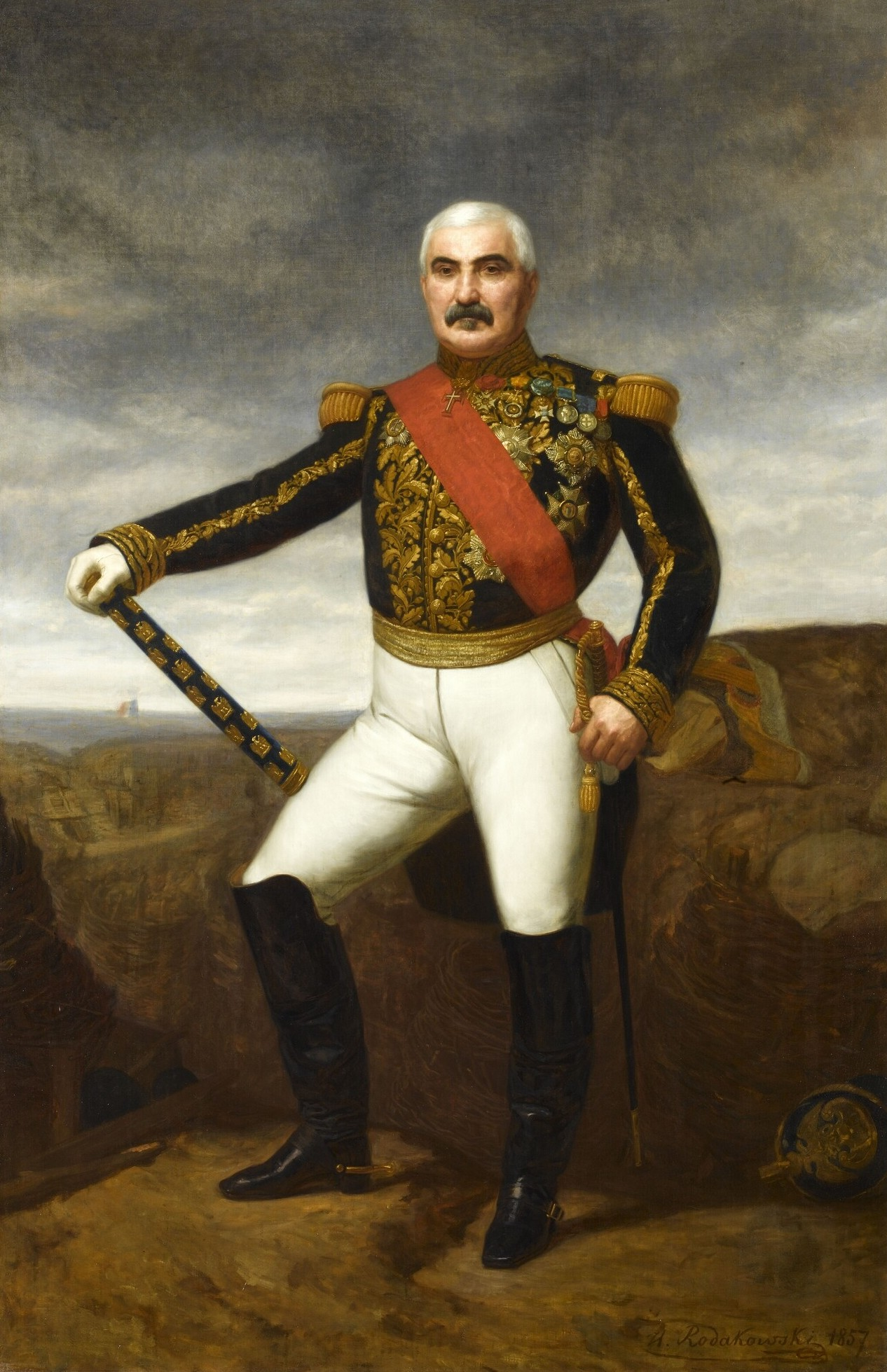
Portrait of Maréchal Pélissier, by Henryk Rodakowski, c. 1857

After the battles of October and November 1854 before Sevastopol, Pélissier was sent to the Crimea, where on 16 May 1855 he succeeded Marshal Canrobert as commander-in-chief of the French forces before the Siege of Sevastopol. His command was marked by relentless pressure of the enemy and unalterable determination to conduct the campaign without interference from Paris. His perseverance was crowned with success in the storming of the Tower of Malakoff on 8 September which ended the Siege of Sevastopol, crowning the Anglo-French Crimean War against Russia with victory. On the 12th he was promoted to marshal. On his return to Paris he was named senator, created Duke of Malakoff (22 July 1856; the only other victory title awarded by Napoleon III, also ducal, was for the victory by Patrice de MacMahon in the Battle of Magenta, in the Italian campaign), and rewarded with a grant of 100,000 francs per annum.

From March 1858 to May 1859, he was French ambassador in London, but was recalled to take command of the army of observation on the Rhine. In the same year, he became Grand Chancellor of the Legion of Honour. In 1860, he was appointed Governor-General of unruly colony of Algeria.

Pélissier died there in 1864, when the dukedom became extinct.

== In popular culture ==
In 1855, Stephen Glover wrote The Duke of Malakoff's March.

== Honours ==
- Second French Empire: Baton of Maréchal de France
- Second French Empire: Grand Chancelier and Grand Croix of the Legion of Honour
- Second French Empire: Médaille militaire
- Bourbon Restoration: Order of Saint Louis
- Spain: Laureate Cross of Saint Ferdinand
- United Kingdom: Honorary Grand Cross of the Order of the Bath (military division), 12 November 1855
- United Kingdom: Crimea Medal
- Belgium: Grand Cordon of the Order of Leopold
- Kingdom of Sardinia: Grand Cordon of the Military Order of Savoy
- Kingdom of Sardinia: Sardinian Crimea Medal
- Kingdom of Portugal: Order of Christ
- Tunisia: Grand Cordon of the Order of Glory
- Ottoman Empire: Grand Cordon of the Order of the Medjidie

== See also ==
- List of Ambassadors of France to the United Kingdom
