= Institutional racism in colonial Algeria =

Institutional racism existed in Algeria under French colonial rule.

== Background ==
The French political thinker Alexis de Tocqueville (1805–1859) supported colonization in general, and particularly the colonization of Algeria. In several speeches on France's foreign affairs, in two official reports presented to the National Assembly in March 1847 on behalf of an ad hoc commission, and in his voluminous correspondence, he repeatedly commented on and analyzed the issue. In short, Tocqueville developed a theoretical basis for French expansion in North Africa. He even studied the Quran, sharply concluding that Islam was "the main cause of the decadence... of the Muslim world". His opinions are also instructive about the early years of the French conquest and how the colonial state was first set up and organized. Tocqueville emerged as an early advocate of "total domination" in Algeria and subsequent "devastation of the country".

On 31 January 1830, Charles X capturing Algiers made the French state thus begin what became institutional racism directed at the Kabyle, or Berbers, of Arab descent in North Africa. The Dey of Algiers had insulted the monarchy by slapping the French ambassador with a fly-whisk, and the French used that pretext to invade and to put an end to piracy in the vicinity. The unofficial objective was to restore the prestige of the French crown and gain a foothold in North Africa, thereby preventing the British gaining advantage over France in the Mediterranean. The July Monarchy, which came to power in 1830, inherited that burden. The next ten years saw the indigenous population subjected to the might of the French army.

By 1840, more conservative elements gained control of the government and dispatched General Thomas Bugeaud, the newly appointed governor of the colony, to Algeria, which marked the real start of the country's conquest. The methods employed were atrocious; the army deported villagers en masse, massacred the men and raped the women, took the children hostage, stole livestock and harvests and destroyed orchards. Tocqueville wrote, "I believe the laws of war entitle us to ravage the country and that we must do this, either by destroying crops at harvest time, or all the time by making rapid incursions, known as raids, the aim of which is to carry off men and flocks."

Tocqueville added: "In France I have often heard people I respect, but do not approve, deplore [the army] burning harvests, emptying granaries and seizing unarmed men, women and children. As I see it, these are unfortunate necessities that any people wishing to make war on the Arabs must accept." He also advocated that "all political freedoms must be suspended in Algeria". Marshal Bugeaud, who was the first governor-general and also headed the civil government, was rewarded by the King for the conquest and having instituted the systemic use of torture, and following a "scorched earth" policy against the Arab population.

The French colonial state, as he conceived it and as it took shape in Algeria, was a two-tiered organization, quite unlike the regime in Mainland France. It introduced two different political and legal systems that were based on racial, cultural and religious distinctions. According to Tocqueville, the system that should apply to the Colons would enable them alone to hold property and travel freely but would deprive them of any form of political freedom, which should be suspended in Algeria. "There should therefore be two quite distinct legislations in Africa, for there are two very separate communities. There is absolutely nothing to prevent us treating Europeans as if they were on their own, as the rules established for them will only ever apply to them".

Following the defeats of the resistance in the 1840s, colonisation continued apace. By 1848, Algeria was populated by 109,400 Europeans, only 42,274 of whom were French. The leader of the Colons delegation, Auguste Warnier (1810–1875), succeeded in the 1870s in modifying or introducing legislation to facilitate the private transfer of land to settlers and continue Algeria's appropriation of land from the local population and distribution to settlers. Europeans held about 30% of the total arable land, including the bulk of the most fertile land and most of the areas under irrigation.

In 1881, the Code de l'Indigénat made the discrimination official by creating specific penalties for indigenes and by organising the seizure or appropriation of their lands. By 1900, Europeans produced more than two-thirds of the value of output in agriculture and practically all of the agricultural exports. The colonial government imposed more and higher taxes on Muslims than on Europeans. The Muslims, in addition to paying traditional taxes dating from before the French conquest, also paid new taxes from which the Colons were normally exempted. In 1909, for instance, Muslims, who made up almost 90% of the population but produced 20% of Algeria's income, paid 70% of direct taxes and 45% of the total taxes collected. Also, Colons controlled how the revenues would be spent and so their towns had handsome municipal buildings, paved streets lined with trees, fountains and statues, but Algerian villages and rural areas benefited little, if at all, from tax revenues.

=== In education ===
The colonial regime proved severely detrimental to overall education for Muslims, who had previously relied on religious schools to learn reading, writing and religion. In 1843, the state appropriated the habus lands, the religious foundations that constituted the main source of income for religious institutions, including schools, but colonial officials refused to allocate enough money to maintain schools and mosques properly and to provide for enough teachers and religious leaders for the growing population. In 1892, more than five times as much was spent for the education of Europeans as for Muslims, who had five times as many children of school age. Because few Muslim teachers were trained, Muslim schools were largely staffed by French teachers. Even a state-operated madrasa often had French faculty members.

Attempts to institute bilingual and bicultural schools, intended to bring Muslim and European children together in the classroom, were a conspicuous failure, and were rejected by both communities and phased out after 1870. According to one estimate, fewer than 5% of Algerian children attended any kind of school in 1870. As late as 1954, only one Muslim boy in five and one girl in sixteen received formal schooling. Efforts were begun by 1890 to educate a small number of Muslims along with European students in the French school system as part of France's "civilising mission" in Algeria. The curriculum was entirely French and allowed no place for Arabic studies, which were deliberately downgraded even in Muslim schools. Within a generation, a class of well-educated, gallicized Muslims, the évolués (literally "evolved ones"), had been created.

=== Enfranchisement ===
Following its conquest of Ottoman Algeria in 1830, France maintained for well over a century its colonial rule in the territory that has been described as "quasi-apartheid". The colonial law of 1865 allowed Arab and Berber Algerians to apply for French citizenship only if they abandoned their Muslim identity; Azzedine Haddour argues that it established "the formal structures of a political apartheid". Camille Bonora-Waisman writes, "In contrast with the Moroccan and Tunisian protectorates", the "colonial apartheid society" was unique to Algeria.

Under the French Fourth Republic, Muslim Algerians were accorded the rights of citizenship, but the system of discrimination was maintained in more informal ways. Frederick Cooper writes that Muslim Algerians "were still marginalized in their own territory, notably the separate voter roles of 'French' civil status and of 'Muslim' civil status, to keep their hands on power." The "internal system of apartheid" was met with considerable resistance by the Algerian Muslims affected by it, and it is cited as one of the causes of the 1954 insurrection.

There was clearly nothing exceptional about the crimes committed by the French army and state in Algeria from 1955 to 1962. On the contrary, they were part of history repeating itself.

=== State racism ===
Following the views of Michel Foucault, the French historian Olivier Le Cour Grandmaison spoke of a "state racism" under the French Third Republic, a notable example being that the 1881 Indigenous Code applied in Algeria. Replying to the question "Isn't it excessive to talk about a state racism under the Third Republic?", he replied:

"No, if we can recognize 'state racism' as the vote and implementation of discriminatory measures, grounded on a combination of racial, religious and cultural criteria, in those territories. The 1881 Indigenous Code is a monument of this genre! Considered by contemporary prestigious jurists as a 'juridical monstruosity', this code planned special offenses and penalties for 'Arabs'. It was then extended to other territories of the empire. On one hand, a state of rule of law for a minority of French and Europeans located in the colonies. On the other hand, a permanent state of exception for the "indigenous" people. This situation lasted until 1945".

During a reform effort in 1947, the French created a bicameral legislature with one house for French citizens and another for Muslims, but it made a European's vote worth seven times a Muslim's vote.
