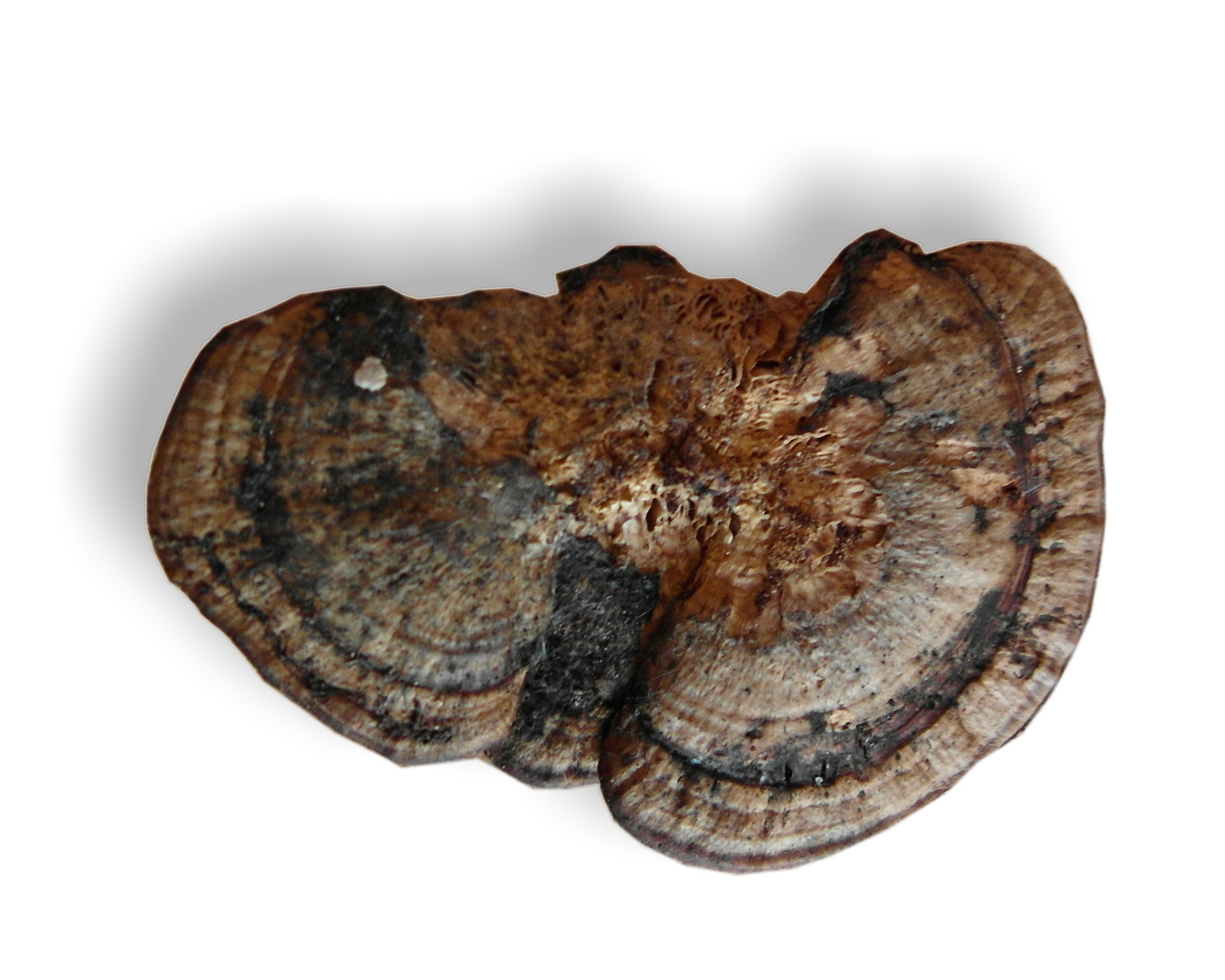

Scientific classification
- Kingdom: Fungi
- Division: Basidiomycota
- Class: Agaricomycetes
- Order: Polyporales
- Family: Polyporaceae
- Genus: Lenzites
- Species: L. warnieri

Binomial name
- Lenzites warnieri Mont. & Durieu (1860)

Synonyms
- Lenzites faventina Caldesi (1869); Lenzites reichardtii Schulzer (1880) Cellularia warnieri (Durieu & Mont.) Kuntze (1898)

= Lenzites warnieri =

Species of fungus

Lenzites warnieri is a species of fungus in the family Polyporaceae found in parts of Europe, Asia, and northern Africa. The species is a white rot pathogen on living wood. Its corky fruiting bodies in the shape of semicircular plates form on the trunks of several types of deciduous trees growing near water bodies in regions of moist sub-Mediterranean climate. The fruiting body, which has a lamellar fruit layer, produces spores only once.

Michel Durieu de Maisonneuve and Camille Montagne classified Lenzites warnieri in 1860, on the basis of a find from northern Algeria. Lenzites warnieri is closely related to various species of the genus Trametes, but their exact taxonomic positions are to date unresolved.

== Taxonomy ==
Lenzites warnieri was first described in 1860 by Michel Durieu de Maisonneuve and Camille Montagne. The type specimen came from Algeria, where Durieu and Montagne collected it from the trunk of an elm on the grounds of the retirement home of the French physician and politician Auguste Warnier. The specific epithet warnieri honors him. The initial description was first published in Annales des Sciences Naturelles (Botanique), although the description had appeared in Mémoires de la Société Linnéenne de Bordeaux at the desire of Durieu.

Because of ambiguities in the identification and species distinction, Lenzites reichardtii Schulz. 1880 was for a long time considered a valid name for L. warnieri in Europe, although its type was much smaller than the one by Durieu und Montagne. At the end of the 20th century, both names were regarded synonyms. A possible conspecifity with Daedalea quercina was long discussed by scientists, such as Giacomo Bresadola, who thought L. warnieri was synonymous with Daedalea quercina, a view adopted in 1940 by Albert Pilát, who named L. warnieri as Daedalea quercina f. lenzitoidea. Unlike L. warnieri, Daedalea quercina has a maze-like hymenophore, causes brown rot, and infests only oaks. In a 1967 mating study, Alix David proved that the fungi are separate species.

Lenzites warnieri is today classified into the genus Lenzites, which is closely related to the genus Trametes as was initially supposed and later demonstrated through DNA analysis. DNA analysis suggests that the more common Lenzites species Lenzites betulina is genetically closer to a species of Trametes than to L. warnierii. The relationship between Lenzites and Trametes is unclear. The authors of one DNA study published in 2011 suggested that Lenzites should be considered a synonym of Trametes, together with the genera Artolenzites, Coriolopsis, Coriolus, Cubamyces, Cyclomycetella, Poronidulus, Pseudotrametes and Pycnoporus.

== Description ==
=== Macroscopic ===
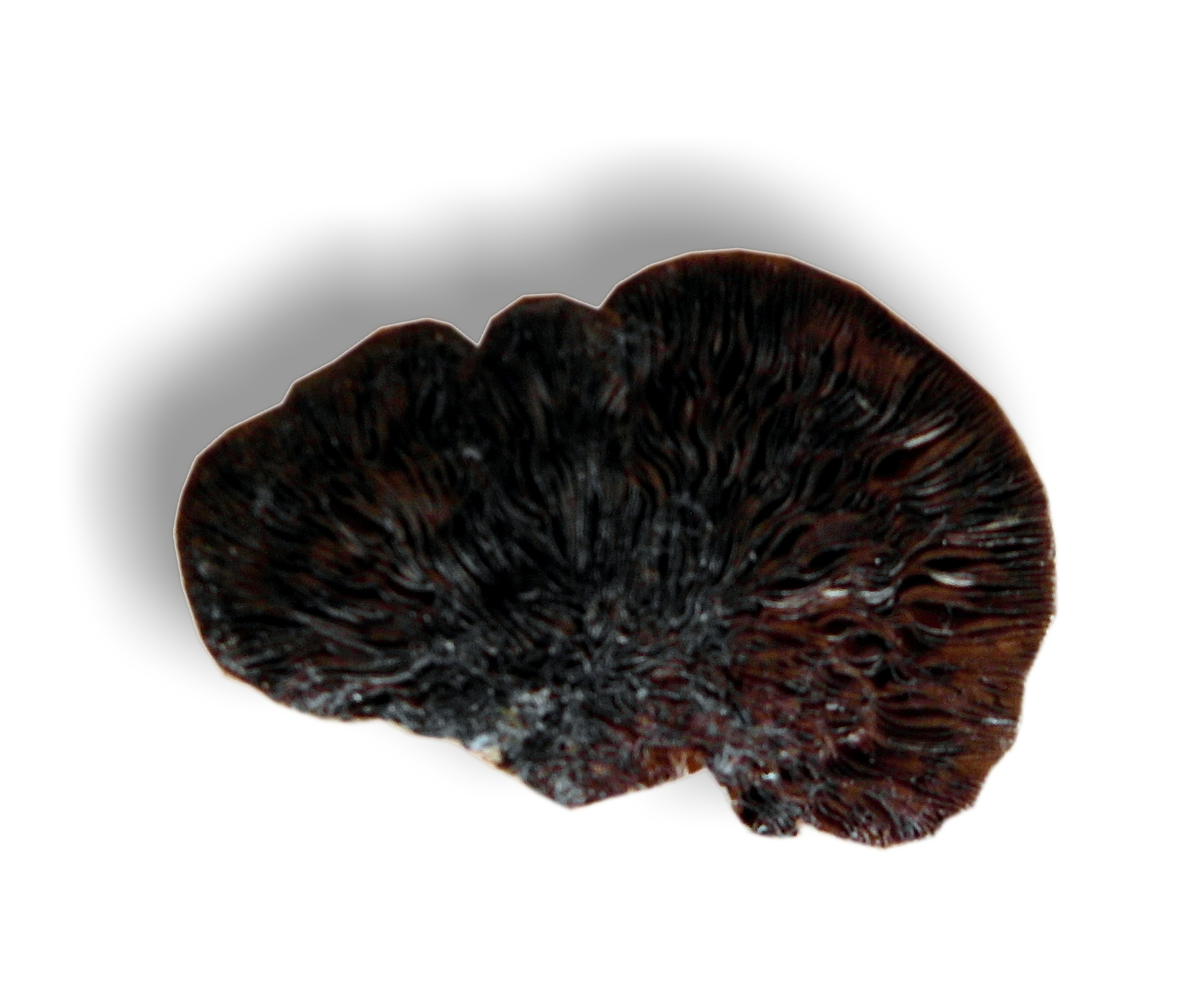
Dried fruit body of Lenzites warnieri with typical lamelliform-labyrinthian fruit layer. The depicted specimen is around 7.5 cm (3.0 in) wide.

The fruit body of Lenzites warnieri is a flattened, semicircular or two-part cap divided through a small recess. It is resupinate (crust-like), lacks a stipe, and sits directly on the host tree. The cap is 5–20 cm (2.0–7.9 in) wide (very rarely up to 45 cm (18 in)), 3–8 cm (1.2–3.1 in) wide from the top to the edge and 1–2 cm (0.4–0.8 in) high. The surface of the young fruit bodies has a velvet texture, but it becomes bald and smooth in maturity and produces small humps or warts. The colour is light cream in young fungi and grey in old fungi. The surface is distinctly zoned; the zone edges are furrowed and dark brown to black. The trama has a tough leathery and corky consistency, but is relatively thin and does not show a definite transition to the gills. The gills are ochre or parchment-coloured, bifurcated, and its body is comparatively deep, up to 1 cm (0.4 in). Below the top of the cap, they move maze-like into each other. When stained with cresyl blue, the hyphae turn dark blue, indicating an orthochromatic reaction.

=== Microscopic ===
The mycelium, which grows in the host tree, is heterothallic and tetrapolar. Lenzites warnieri has a trimitic trama, meaning a tissue comprising generative hyphae, binding hyphae, and skeletal hyphae. While the generative hyphae are responsible for growth, the hardened skeletal hyphae and the thick-walled binding hyphae maintain the stability of the fruit body and provide its corky consistency. The generative hyphae are thin-walled, hyaline, measure 2–3 μm in diameter and have a clamp connection. The binding hyphae are tough, spiral and heavily branched. They are 3–5 μm in diameter and pass over to the skeletal hyphae in the same size. They protrude distinctly into the fruit tissue, a characteristic that differentiates them from the sympatric L. betulinus.

Cystidia, large cells found on the hymenium, have not been found in this species. Microscopic cell structures of the fungus, which while showing similarities with the cystidia are smaller and thinner, may represent cystidiolae (immature cystidia). The club-shaped basidia each have four 4 μm-long, spore-bearing sterigmata. The basidia have clamps on their bases; they become 15–25 × 5–6 μm large. The hyaline spores are constant or crooked cylindrically. They have thin walls, do not react with Melzer's reagent and measure 7–9 × 3–4 μm.

== Distribution ==
Lenzites warnieri populates a large area of the Palaearctic, but is not distributed locally. Early finds were at times not confirmed in later years. Most recent recorded occurrences are in the temperate to sub-mediterranean climatic zones. Because the host spectrum of L. warnieri is broad, its habitat is not determined by the appearance of host plants, but by climatic conditions. Their primary habitat is the southern Central and Northern Europe. They have been rarely found on the 48th latitude, such as on the Upper Rhine Plain. The northern border of their range may be the 18 °C July-isotherm. The southern habitat border comprises the African Atlas Mountains and the bordering regions, and in Asia it proceeds to the 36th latitude. While low temperature on the northern border does not affect its habitat, the fungus may also populate the dry southern border.

The southernmost finds were in the High Atlas and the offshore Algeria. Only two finds were detected on the Iberian Peninsula, one from Barcelona and the other from Guadalajara. In France it is distributed in the south, southeast and in the Yonne region. There were two collections on the Upper Rhine in Germany, and towards northwest in Leudelange, Luxembourg. The northernmost distributions (51° 59′ N) were in the Netherlands, where fungi were found on three occasions in the southern region. There were further findings in northeast Italy and on the opposite side of the Adriatic Sea, in the Sava-Danube area in Serbia and Croatia. An almost enclosed habitat exists in the Pannonian Basin, mainly in Hungary. Further to the southwest there were three findings on the Macedonian Vardar, and further three in the Bulgarian eastern Rhodopes and on the Black Sea coast near Primorsko. It has also been recorded in Turkey and Iran.

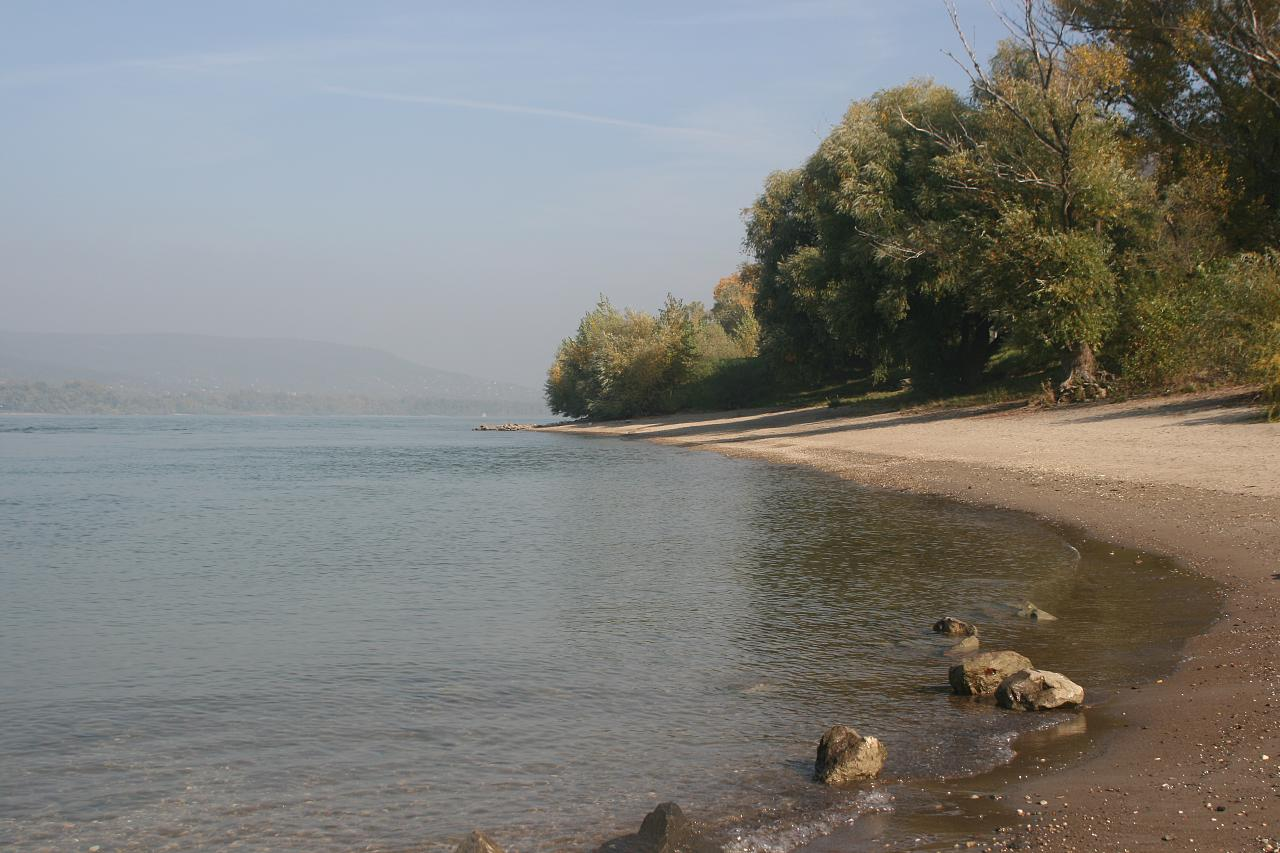
Lenzites warnieri favors humid riparian forests, such as the Hungarian Visegrád depicted here.

In the area of the former Soviet Union, there were findings in the Ukrainian Carpathians and Bilhorod-Dnistrovskyi, in the Georgian Gagra, Armenian Ander and Turkmenistan. There are unspecified findings in the northern Caucasus, the Russian Black Sea coast and the Urals. Kazakhstan had three collections in the East Kazakhstan Province, the Trans-Ili Alatau and the Dzungarian Alatau. The easternmost find comes from Vyazemsky. In the interglacial periods of the Pleistocene the habitat reached the areas of today's continental-temperate climates, as was validated by a fossil find in Thuringia from the Eemian. There were also fossil finds in the French Clairvaux-les-Lacs from the Chalcolithic.

== Ecology ==
The hosts of L. warnieri are usually willow (Salix spp.), elm (Ulmus spp.), cottonwood (Populus spp.), alder (Alnus spp.) and other species found in warm, moist sites. The fungus prefers wet areas, like riparian forests and fens. Its mycelium only grows at warm temperatures, with optimal growth at 37 °C (99 °F). The fungus is relatively winter-hardy, but it is sensitive to drops of temperature during summer, which likely explains why it is often found only on the sunny side of tree trunks. Because of its temperature sensitivities, the fungus is rare in the northern latitudes.

The species only infests living wood, on which it causes white rot. By doing so, the lignin is degraded in the infested zones, and the wood becomes fibrous, bleaches, and loses strength. The spores of L. warnieri are transported in spring by wind to the host tree. Often, only one tree becomes infested, while other neighbouring trees are unaffected. The mycelium of the fungus populates the host tree and produces numerous fruit bodies in autumn. Those are at first fruitless and sporulates only in the following spring, after enduring winter. The fruit bodies are annual.
