= Auguste Warnier =

French medical doctor, journalist and politician

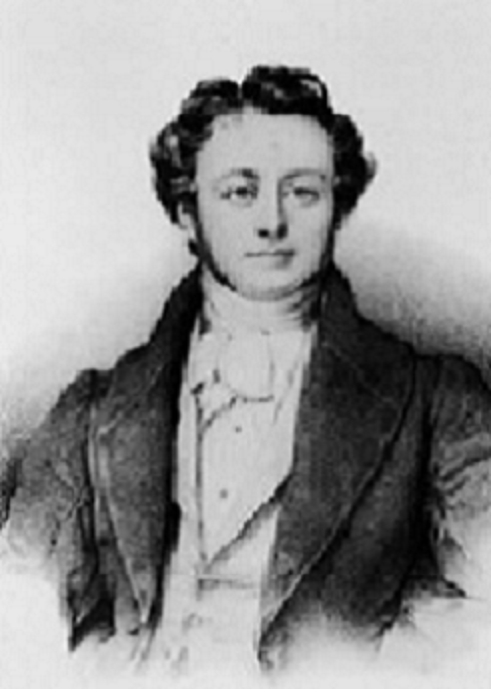
- Warnier as a young man

Representative for Algiers
- In office 9 July 1871 – 15 March 1875

Personal details
- Born: Auguste Hubert Warnier; 8 January 1810 Rocroi, Ardennes, France
- Died: 15 March 1875 (aged 65) Versailles, Yvelines, France
- Occupation: Medical doctor, journalist and politician

Auguste Hubert Warnier (8 January 1810 – 15 March 1875) was a French medical doctor, journalist and politician who spent most of his career in Algeria. At first he was a Saint-Simonian and was sympathetic to the local population. He thought the Berbers had Germanic blood and a civilization derived from Roman and Christian origins, so could readily adapt to French civilization. He had no respect for the Arab "intruders". Later he took the view that the indigenous people had destroyed the once-fertile environment of Algeria, became a proponent of French colonization and opposed the "Arab Kingdom" policy of Napoleon III. In his last years he was a Representative in the National Assembly for the Province of Algiers. He was responsible for a law that allowed expropriation of land or forced sale to colonists.

== Early years (1810–34) ==
Auguste Hubert Warnier was born on 8 January 1810 in Rocroi, Ardennes. His parents were Jean-Louis Warnier (1774–1814), Lieutenant in the 6th line regiment and Knight of the Legion of Honour, and Marie Salomé Victoire Seguin (c. 1789–1849). He received a classical education in Reims. He studied medicine in Paris. After passing his medical examinations he was in turn attached to the Val-de-Grâce military hospital in Paris and the military hospital in Lille. By 1831 he was a military doctor. He was named assistant surgeon in Douai in 1832.

== July Monarchy (1834–48) ==
Warnier was sent to Oran during the cholera outbreak of 1834. In Algeria he studied the customs and language of the Arabs while serving with the ambulances of the Army of Africa. In 1835 he was cited for his role in the fighting at Mostaganem for having recovered, alone, a dying soldier from the field of battle. Warnier joined the Service des Affaires Arabes in 1837 and served in Mascara until 1839 treating the indigenous people and fighting cholera. In the process he gained a solid understanding of Arab society. Warnier served with the consul Eugène Daumas in Mascara, and Daumas wrote to his commanding officer in Oran saying he was a congenial and talented assistant. He was praised for his medical skill, his humanity and his knowledge of Algeria and its peoples. In 1838 he was a member of the mission sent to the Emir Abdelkader after the Treaty of Tafna. (Note: In 1865 Warnier denied the legitimacy of the Emir, and noted that Abd el-Kader had been elected in 1832 not to found a kingdom but to fight the infidel.) In 1839 he completed his medical studies and received a doctorate in medicine from the University of Montpellier.

Warnier and Joanny André Napoléon Perier were the two physicians on the Scientific Commission for the Exploration of Algeria, which operated from 1840 to 1842 and resulted in the publication of 39 volumes on a range of subjects. Warnier met the Saint-Simonian leader Prosper Enfantin, whom he befriended, and became one of Enfantin's most faithful collaborators. As a Saint-Simonian he earned hostility from some quarters, praise from others. In 1843 Warnier represented the government to prisoners captured at the Battle of the Smala. He was attached to the maritime expedition to Morocco in 1844, and sent almost daily reports to Enfantin who published them in his newspaper Algeria. He was in charge of negotiating the Treaty of Tangiers (1844). He was promoted to Officer of the Legion of Honour on 17 October 1844. He was then director of civil affairs in Oran.

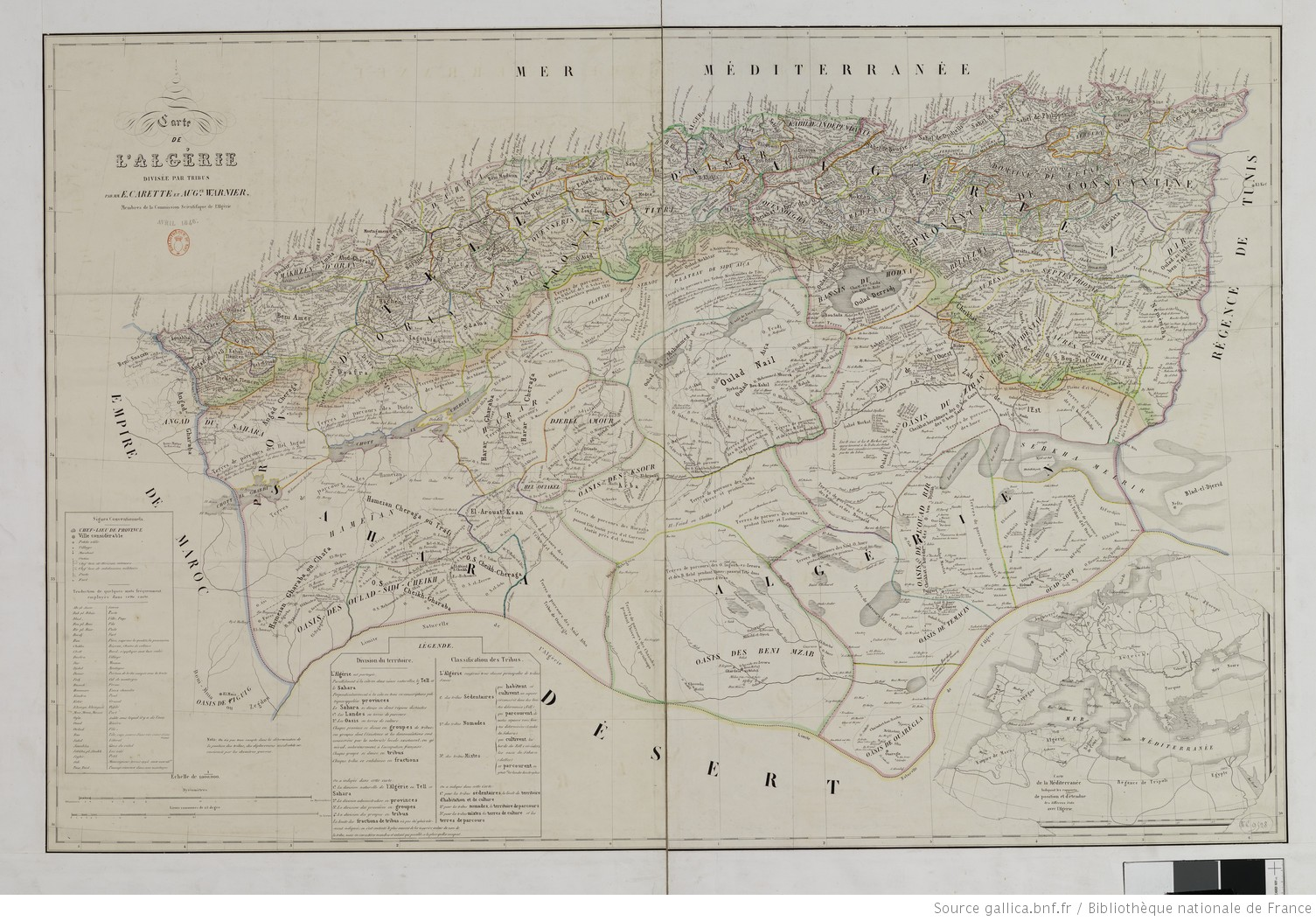
Map of Algeria showing tribal divisions (1846) by Warnier and Ernest Carette

In an official publication in 1847 Warnier and Ernest Carette^{(fr)} wrote positively about the nomads, although later Warnier would support colonialism. Warnier considered that the local people formed three groups: 1 million were Berbers who spoke the Berber language. 1.2 million were Arab-speaking Berbers and 500,000 were pure Arabs or other minorities such as Turks and Moors. Daumas was among those who thought the Kabyle people, the largest Berber group, were partly Germanic in origin, had formerly been Christians and had not been fully converted to Islam. In an 1865 book Warnier extended this theory to cover all Berbers. The cross-like tattoos on the faces of many Kabyles was taken as evidence. Warnier believed that the Berber civilization had evolved from Roman and Christian traditions, and the Berber speakers, in particular, had escaped the pernicious influence of the Arabs and could adapt to French civilization. The Arab intruders, in his view, had never established anything of value and would remain alien nomads.

== Second Republic and Second Empire (1848–70) ==
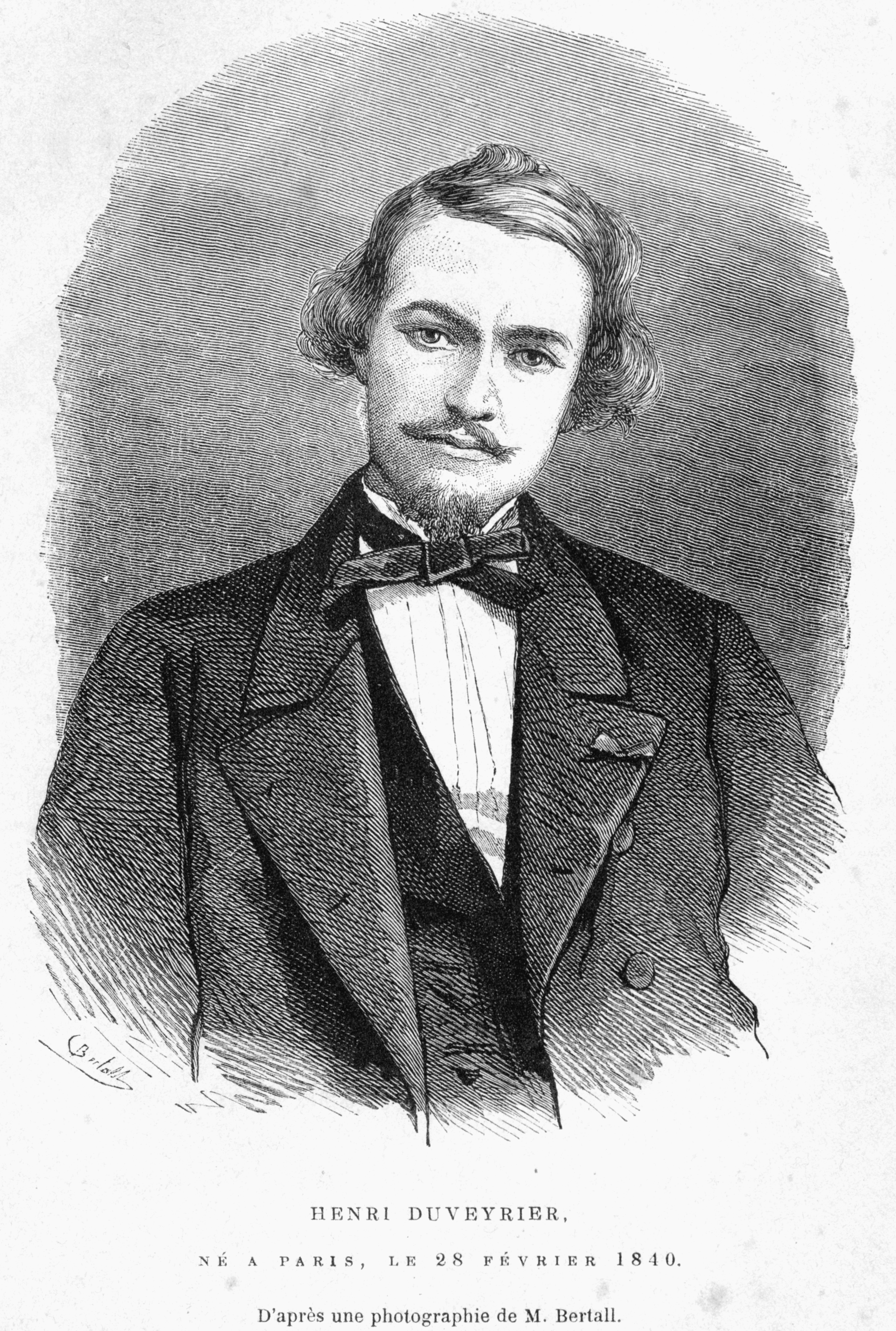
Henri Duveyrier in 1864, aged about 24

During the French Second Republic Warnier was a member of the council of the government of Algeria in 1848–49. He returned to private life, and in 1850 founded the Atlas newspaper. This was suppressed after the coup d'état of 2 December 1851. Warnier was one of the last companions of Père Enfantin, and stayed as a colonist in the Sahel of Algiers Province. During the Second French Empire Warnier created a large agricultural establishment on the banks of the old Lake Alloula.

For many years Warnier was a strong supporter of projects to open up the Sahara. He helped Henri Duveyrier, son of one of his and Enfantin's friends. Duveyrier was Warnier's guest in 1857 at his home in Kandouri, a suburb of Algiers, where he met Oscar MacCarthy. On 8 March 1857 Duveyrier and MacCarthy left on a five-week trip to Laghouat and back. Duveyrier was fascinated by the Tuaregs he met on this trip and the next year gave an account of Tuareg customs to the Berlin Oriental Society. Later Duveyrier made an unsuccessful attempt to reach Tuat, which was stopped by the Tuaregs at El Goléa. Duveyrier left in May 1859 and after an exhausting journey returned to Warnier's house on 5 December 1861, emaciated and delirious with fever.

By the early 1860s Warnier was no longer associated with the army or the Saint-Simonians, but had become a spokesman for the colons. He had retired from the army in 1861. His L'Algérie devant le Sénat (1863), a collection of his articles from L'Opinion Nationale, laid out the principles for colonization of Algeria by civilian settlers. It was widely read in France, and was followed by several other books along the same lines. In 1862 he was the doctor and confidant of Sheikh Othman during his trip to France. Sheikh Othman was leader of the religious Iforas tribe of the Kel Ajjer and had been Duveyrier's host in 1859.

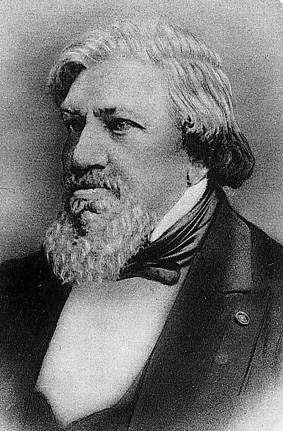
Warnier in later years

Warnier gained great prestige among the settlers since he and Jules Duval^{(fr)} in Paris were leaders of a group opposed to the emperor's Arab Kingdom policy. (Note: Napoleon III respected the Algerian Arabs and their leader, the Emir Abdelkader. On 6 February 1863 he wrote to the Governor General of Algeria, Marshal Aimable Pélissier, saying "Algeria was not a colony as such but an Arab kingdom". Influenced by Saint Simonians, he wanted to give the Arab tribes and sub-tribes inalienable rights to their lands, and to restrain French agricultural colonization. By an act of 14 July 1865 any Arab could obtain French citizenship on request as long as they abandoned polygamy. The French colonists in Algeria were not impressed.) In 1869 Warnier and Jules Duval wrote that, "In their rebellions against our authority, the indigènes are able to distinguish between the colon and the solder." They said the government downplayed this fact since it would undermine the justification for the "exceptional" military regime. Warner tried to fight the government in Algeria and published several brochures on the subject. Warnier was skeptical about Napoleon's 1865 sénatus-consulte that defined conditions for native Algerians to become French citizens. He wrote in 1865,

When the time comes that an imperial decree orders the creation of private property among the Arab tribes, a complete social revolution will be decreed and it is not at all certain that the tribespeople accustomed to the yoke of their tribal leaders ... will not themselves repudiate the benefits of private property, in order to preserve the communism of collective ownership more in harmony with their nomadic lifestyle.

Warnier thought the imperial government was sacrificing the interests of the French settlers in favour of the Arab aristocracy, which wanted to prevent progress and maintain their feudal control. He provided proof, based on crop production and taxes paid, that one settler was worth ten indigenous people. In 1865 Warnier blamed the nomads for destroying the Algerian environment, writing that the land was "long ago a sort of terrestrial paradise ... today this land is a sterile desert."

== Third Republic (1870–75) ==
After the fall of the empire, on 5 September 1870 Warnier became Prefect of Algiers. He resigned from this position to run as candidate for the National Assembly in Algiers on 17 February 1871, but was defeated. Warnier ran again in the same department on 9 July 1871 after the resignation of Giuseppe Garibaldi and this time was elected. He was also a General counselor of the province of Algiers from August 1870. In the Assembly he sat with the left, voted against the bishops' petition, against the resignation of Adolphe Thiers, against the septennate and against the ministry of Albert, 4th duc de Broglie.

The government of the French Third Republic reversed the policy of Napoleon III and gave strong support to the French colonists in Algeria. The Algerian revolt of 1871–72 was crushed and the Algerians were subsequently repressed. Warnier used the narrative of destruction of the environment by the local people to justify the 1873 settlers' property law that took his name. The "Loi Warnier" accelerated the alienation of the peasantry of Algeria from their lands. Islamic Law no longer applied to landholdings. The law facilitated forced purchase or confiscation of land by the colonists. While deputy, Warnier introduced Hippolyte Mircher to the future explorer of French Africa Paul Soleillet. Warnier also introduced Soleillet to Léon Cremieux, president of the Israelite Alliance of Algeria, who had obtained French citizenship for Algerian Jews.

Auguste Warnier died in office on 15 March 1875 in Versailles, Yvelines. The fungus Lenzites warnieri is named after him. It was found growing on the trunks of elms in Warnier's Kandouri property. (Note: Habitat ad truncos Ulmi in provincia Algeriensi, loco proprio Ferme de Kandouri dicto, a cl. Warniero inventa eiqu a nobis libenti animo dicata species pulcherrima distinctissimaque.)

== Publications ==
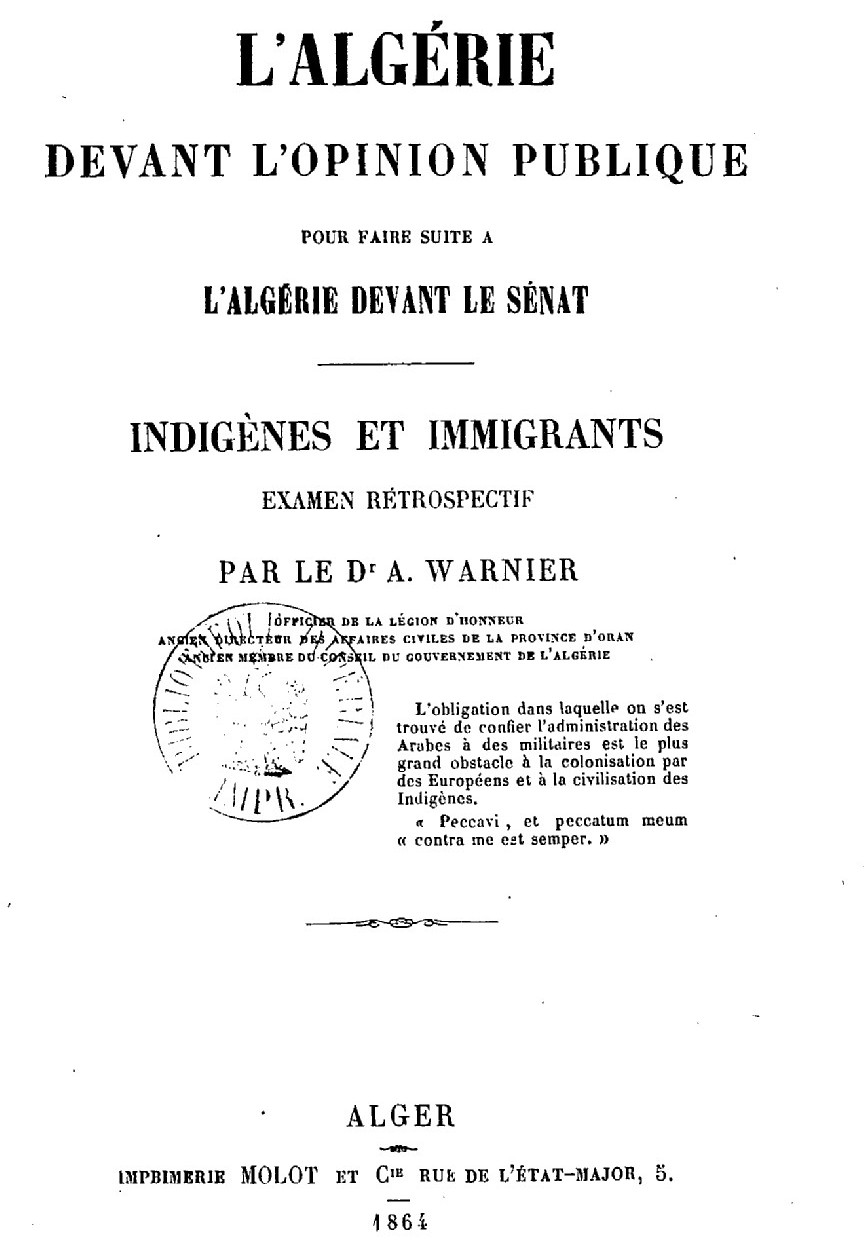
L'Algérie devant l'opinion publique

Publications by Warnier include:

- Auguste Warnier (24 August 1839), Du traitement des plaies d'armes à feu chez les arabes bédouins de l'Algérie, Montpellier
- L. Bouffard; Ernest Carette; Auguste Warnier (1846), Carte de l'Algérie divisée par tribus (1 carte en 2 coupures non assemblées), Paris: Lemercier lith.
- Auguste Warnier (1846), "Des Moyens d'assurer la domination française en Algérie", par M. le lieutenant-général baron de Létang : Examen, Paris: impr. de A. Guyot, p. 54
- Ernest Carette; Auguste Warnier (1847), Description et division de l'Algérie (Notice extraite du "Tableau de la situation des établissemens français en Algérie, 1844–1845", publié par le Ministère de la guerre), Paris, Alger: Hachette, p. 45
- Ernest Carette; Auguste Warnier (1847), Description et division de l'Algérie, Paris, Alger: Hachette, p. 71
- P. Delavigne; U. Ranc; Serpolet; Auguste Warnier (December 1858), À messieurs les membres du Conseil général de la province d'Alger (Réponse à l'opinion de M. F. Sarlande sur la création des chemins de fer en Algérie, par les auteurs du projet d'un réseau général par la ligne centrale du Tell.), Alger : impr. de Rifa et Pézé, p. 12
- Auguste Warnier (1863), L'Algérie devant le Sénat, Paris: impr. de Dubuisson, p. 176
- Auguste Warnier (1864), L'Algérie devant l'opinion publique, pour faire suite à "l'Algérie devant le Sénat". Indigènes et immigrants, Alger: impr. de Molot, p. 176
- Auguste Warnier (1865), L'Algérie devant l'Empereur : pour faire suite à "L'Algérie devant le Sénat" et à "L'Algérie devant l'opinion publique", Paris: Challamel aîné, p. 328
- Jules Duval; Auguste Warnier (1868), Un programme de politique algérienne (lettres adressées à Son Exc. M. Rouher Extrait de "L'Économiste français", journal bi-mensuel), Paris: Challamel aîné
- Jules Duval; Auguste Warnier (1869), Bureaux arabes et colons, réponse au "Constitutionnel" pour faire suite aux "Lettres à M. Rouher", Paris: Challamel aîné, p. 190
- Auguste Warnier (1871), L'Algérie et les victimes de la guerre, Imprimerie Duclaux
- Auguste Warnier (4 April 1873), Rapport fait au nom de la commission chargée d'examiner : 1 ° le projet de loi relatif à l'établissement et à la conservation de la propriété en Algérie, ainsi qu'à la transmission contractuelle des immeubles et droits immobiliers; 2 ° le projet de loi de procédure sur les mêmes matières, Versailles: Impr. de Cerf et fils / Assemblée nationale, p. 62
- Auguste Warnier (1944), Campagne du Maroc, 1844 (journal d'Auguste-Hubert Warnier), Paris: Henry-René d' Allemagne, p. 211

== Sources ==
- Amster, Ellen J. (2013-08-15), Medicine and the Saints: Science, Islam, and the Colonial Encounter in Morocco, 1877–1956, University of Texas Press, ISBN 978-0-292-75481-2
- Anceau, Eric, "Napoleon III and Abd el-Kader", Napoleon.org
- Auguste, Hubert Warnier (in French), Assemblée nationale
- Auguste Warnier (1810–1875) (in French), BnF: Bibliotheque nationale de France
- d'Allemagne, Henry-René, ed. (1944), Journal d'Auguste-Hubert Warnier, chirurgien-major attaché à l'état-major du prince de Joinville à la campagne du Maroc, 1844 (in French)
- Davis, Diana K. (2007-09-11), Resurrecting the Granary of Rome: Environmental History and French Colonial Expansion in North Africa, Ohio University Press, ISBN 978-0-8214-1751-5
- Deguerne, Vincent, "Auguste WARNIER", Geneanet (in French)
- Dymond, Anne Elizabeth; Jirat-Wasiutyński, Vojtěch (2007), Modern Art and the Idea of the Mediterranean, University of Toronto Press, ISBN 978-0-8020-9170-3
- Gallois, W. (2008-09-24), The Administration of Sickness: Medicine and Ethics in Nineteenth-Century Algeria, Palgrave Macmillan UK, ISBN 978-0-230-58260-6
- Grand Chancellerie de la Legion d'Honneur, Reconstitution des Matricules (in French)
- Heffernan, Michael (November 1989), "The Limits of Utopia: Henri Duveyrier and the Exploration of the Sahara in the Nineteenth Century", The Geographical Journal, 155 (3), geographicalj: 342–352, Bibcode:1989GeogJ.155..342H, doi:10.2307/635209, JSTOR 635209
- Keenan, Jeremy (2004-08-02), The Lesser Gods of the Sahara: Social Change and Indigenous Rights, Routledge, ISBN 978-1-135-75805-9
- Lorcin, Patricia M. E. (1999-07-16), Imperial Identities: Stereotyping, Prejudice and Race in Colonial Algeria, I.B.Tauris, ISBN 978-1-86064-376-7
- Lorcin, Patricia M. E. (December 1999b), "Imperialism, Colonial Identity, and Race in Algeria, 1830-1870: The Role of the French Medical Corps", Isis, 90 (4), The University of Chicago Press on behalf of The History of Science Society: 653–679, doi:10.1086/384506, JSTOR 237655, PMID 10743339, S2CID 27727233
- Marçot, Jean-Louis (2011), "Abd el-Kader et la modernité", Studia Islamica (in French), 106 (2), Maisonneuve & Larose: 281–300, doi:10.1163/19585705-12341262, JSTOR 23884959
- Montagne, Camille (1860), "Neuvième Centurie de Plantes Cellulaires Nouvelles tant Indigènes et Exotiques, Décades I et II.", Annales des Sciences Naturelles. Botanique, Quatrième Série (in French), 14, Paris: Fortin, Masson & Cie
- Robert, Adolphe; Cougny, Gaston (1889–1891), "WARNIER (AUGUSTE-HUBERT)" (PDF), in Edgar Bourloton (ed.), Dictionnaire des Parlementaires français (1789–1889) (in French)
- Valette, Jacques (Fall–Winter 1980), "Pénétration française au Sahara et exploration : le cas de Paul Soleillet" (PDF), Revue française d'histoire d'outre-mer (in French), 67 (248–249): 253–267, doi:10.3406/outre.1980.2261
