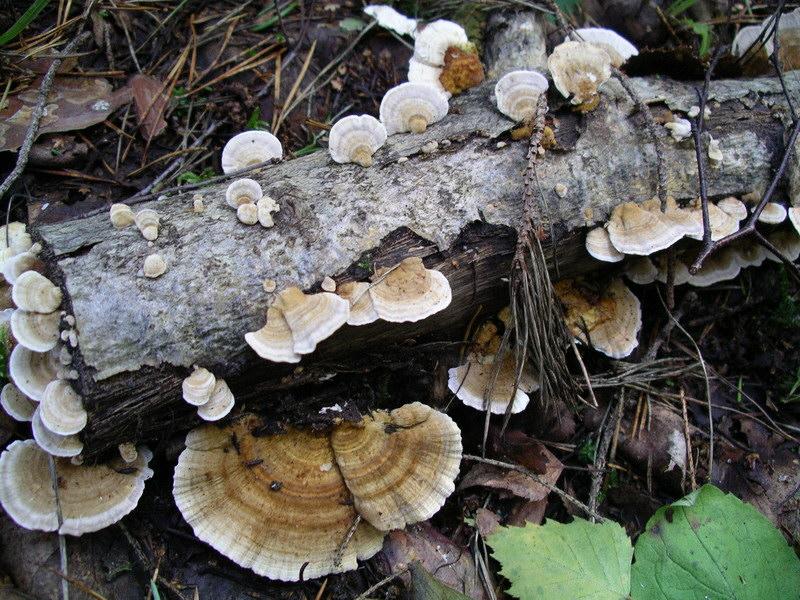
- Lenzites betulina

Scientific classification
- Kingdom: Fungi
- Division: Basidiomycota
- Class: Agaricomycetes
- Order: Polyporales
- Family: Polyporaceae
- Genus: Lenzites; Fr. (1835)

Type species
- Lenzites betulina (L.) Fr. (1838)

Synonyms
- Leucolenzites Falck (1909)

= Lenzites =

Genus of fungi

Lenzites is a widespread genus of wood-decay fungi in the family Polyporaceae. It was circumscribed by Elias Magnus Fries in 1835. The generic name honours German naturalist Harald Othmar Lenz (1798–1870).

== Species ==
A 2008 estimate placed 6 species in Lenzites. As of October 2016, Index Fungorum accepts 26 species:

- Lenzites alba Beeli (1929)
- Lenzites alborepanda Lloyd (1923)
- Lenzites aurea Velen. (1930)
- Lenzites betulina (L.) Fr. (1838)
- Lenzites britzelmayrii Killerm. (1925)
- Lenzites cinnabarina Imbach (1946)
- Lenzites earlei Murrill (1908)
- Lenzites ferruginea (F.C.Harrison) Sacc. & Trotter (1912)
- Lenzites flabelliformis L.M.Dufour (1913)
- Lenzites glabra Lloyd (1919)
- Lenzites glabrescens (Berk.) G.Cunn. (1950)
- Lenzites kusanoi (Murrill) Teng (1964)
- Lenzites leveillei Pat. (1900)
- Lenzites lutescens Syd. & P.Syd. (1900)
- Lenzites muelleri (Berk. ex Cooke) Lloyd (1919)
- Lenzites nummularia Lohwag (1937)
- Lenzites pergamenea Pat. (1914)
- Lenzites shichiana (Teng & L.Ling) Teng (1964)
- Lenzites spegazzinii Bres. (1926)
- Lenzites stereoides (Fr.) Ryvarden (1972)
- Lenzites styracina (Henn. & Shirai) Lloyd (1919)
- Lenzites thermophila O.Falck (1909)
- Lenzites trabeiformis (Murrill) Murrill (1912)
- Lenzites undulata (Hoffm.) Sacc. & Traverso (1912)
- Lenzites yoshinagae Lloyd (1922)
