= Arab Kingdom Project (Algeria) =

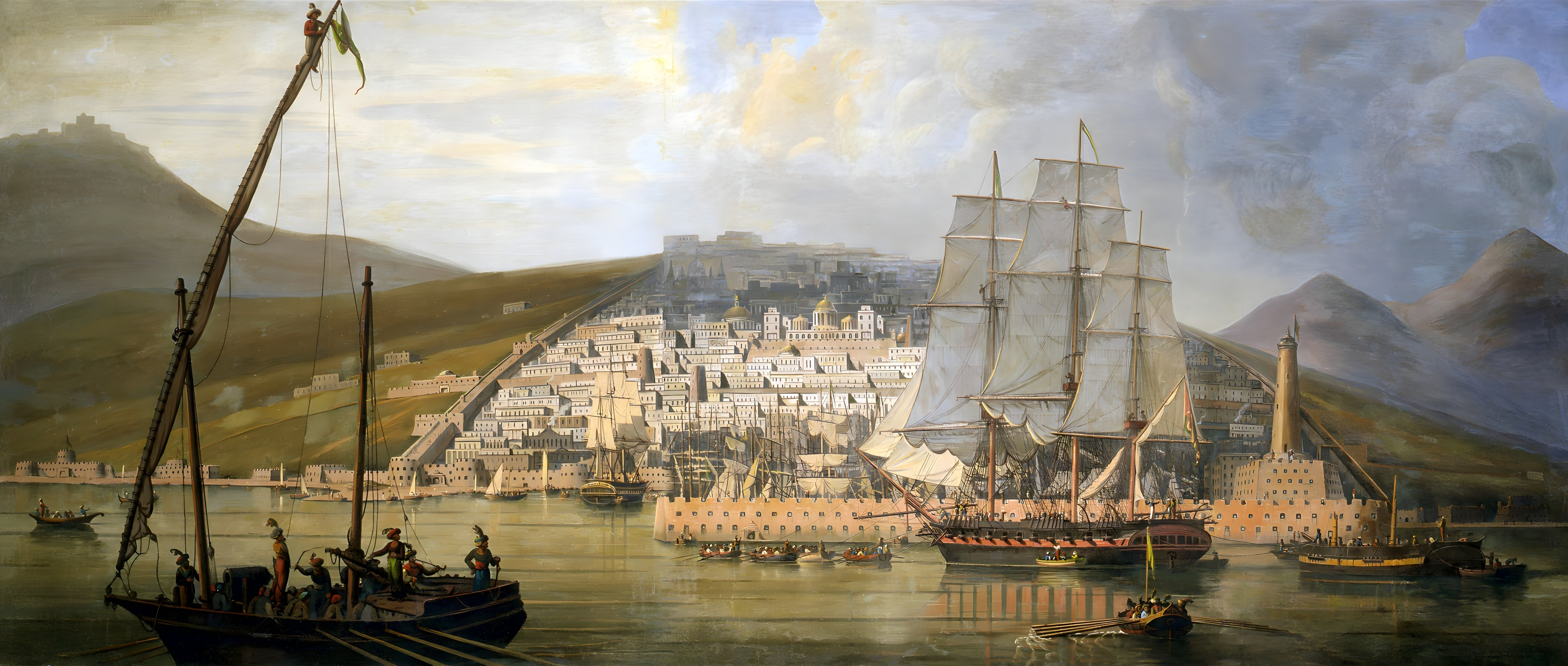
Painting of Algiers in 1828

The Arab Kingdom in Algeria was a political project in the 1860s led by Napoleon III and Ismael Urbain aimed at transforming Algeria, then a recent French conquest, into an associated, self-governing Arab state rather than a settler colony. Urbain argued for a "harmoniously hierarchical" structure where France provided leadership and capital whilst Arabs managed agriculture, ensuring equality between metropolitan and indigenous inhabitants. The concept of neo-Arabism was thus launched by Napoleon III, who envisaged the creation of an "Arab Kingdom" extending from Algiers to Baghdad.

== History ==
Napoleon III, who took power in 1852, told advocates of all-out European colonization that he refused to inflict on the Arab population the fate of the Indians in North America, "an impossible and inhumane thing." On the contrary, he wanted to foster the prosperity of "that [Arab] race—intelligent, proud, warlike, and agrarian," "Algeria is not a colony…but an Arab kingdom…I am as much the emperor of the Arabs as of the French!", he proclaimed during a trip to Algeria, in spite of the discontent of the colons, who wanted pure and simple reattachment to the motherland.

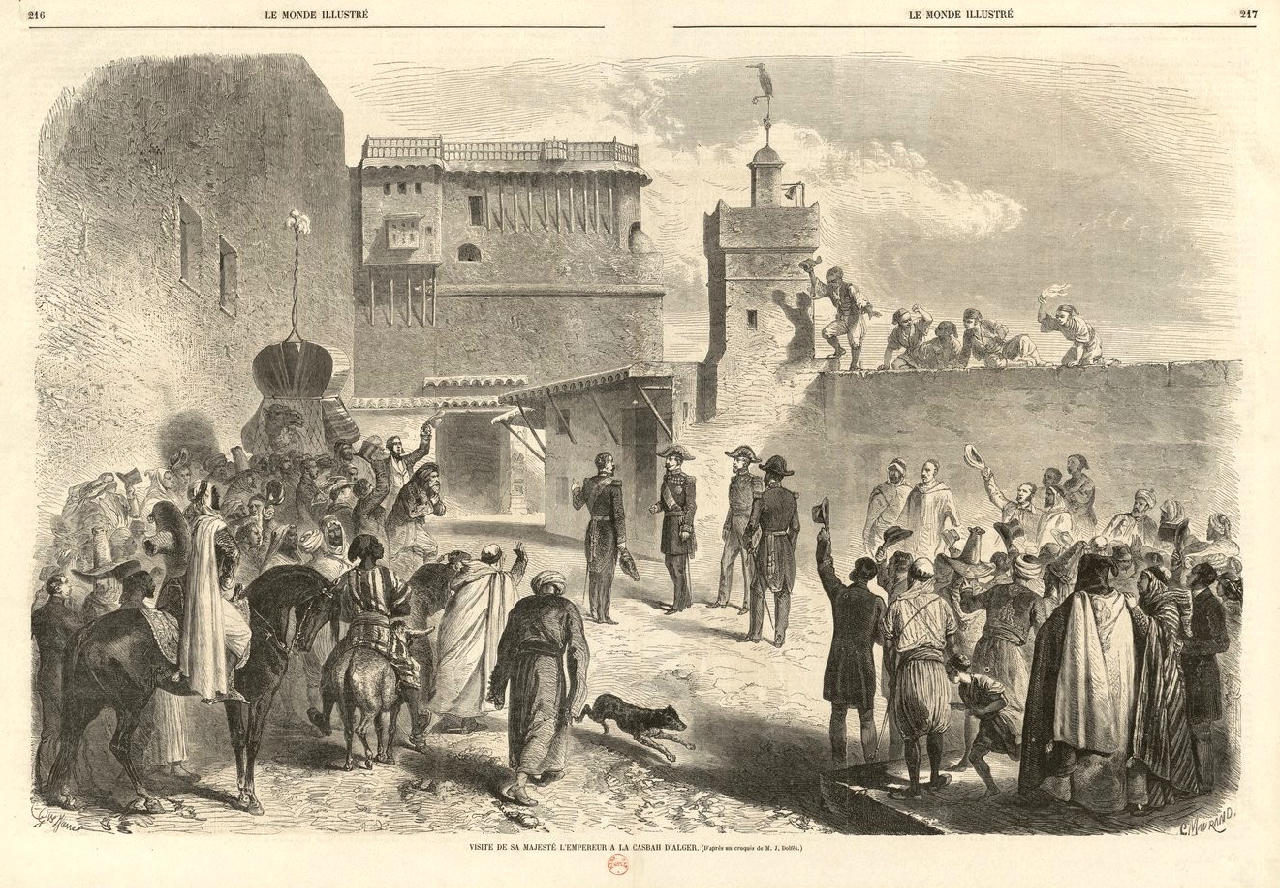
Napoleon III visiting the Casbah of Algiers, 1865

Napoleon III visited Algeria twice in the early 1860s. He was profoundly impressed with the nobility and virtue of the tribal chieftains, who appealed to the emperor's romantic nature, and was shocked by the self-serving attitude of the colon leaders. He decided to halt the expansion of European settlement beyond the coastal zone and to restrict contact between Muslims and the colons, whom he considered to have a corrupting influence on the indigenous population. He envisioned a grand design for preserving most of Algeria for the Muslims by founding a royaume arabe (Arab kingdom) with himself as the roi des Arabes (king of the Arabs). He instituted the so-called politics of the grands chefs to deal with the Muslims directly through their traditional leaders. It was also a way of putting an end to the administrative uncertainty of the conquest of Algeria.

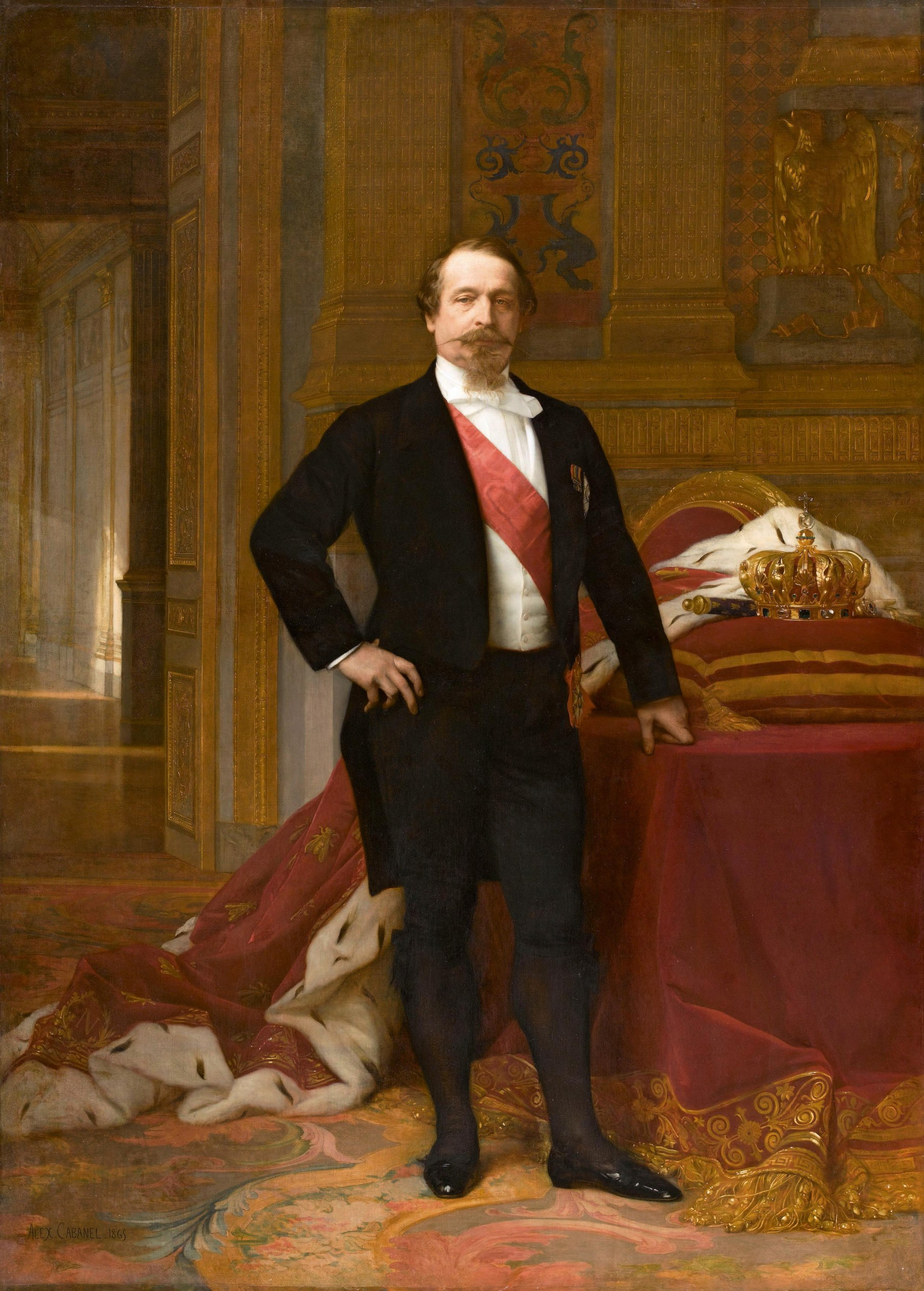
Portrait of Napoleon III, 1865

To further his plans for the royaume arabe, Napoleon III issued two decrees affecting tribal structure, land tenure, and the legal status of Muslims in French Algeria. The first, promulgated in 1863, was intended to renounce the state's claims to tribal lands and eventually provide private plots to individuals in the tribes, thus dismantling "feudal" structures and protecting the lands from the colons. Tribal areas were to be identified, delimited into douars (administrative units), and given over to councils. Arable land was to be divided among members of the douar over a period of one to three generations, after which it could be bought and sold by the individual owners. Unfortunately for the tribes, however, the plans of Napoleon III quickly unraveled. French officials sympathetic to the colons took much of the tribal land they surveyed into the public domain. In addition, some tribal leaders immediately sold communal lands for quick gains. The process of converting arable land to individual ownership was accelerated to only a few years when laws were enacted in the 1870s stipulating that no sale of land by an individual Muslim could be invalidated by the claim that it was collectively owned. The cudah and other tribal officials, appointed by the French on the basis of their loyalty to France rather than the allegiance owed them by the tribe, lost their credibility as they were drawn into the European orbit, becoming known derisively as béni-oui-oui.

Napoleon III envisaged three distinct Algerias: a French colony, an Arab country, and a military camp, each with a distinct form of local government. The second decree, issued in 1865, was designed to recognize the differences in cultural background of the French and the Muslims. As French nationals, Muslims could serve on equal terms in the French Armed Forces and civil service and could migrate to France proper. They were also granted the protection of French law while retaining the right to adhere to Islamic law in litigation concerning their personal status. But if Muslims wished to become full citizens, they had to accept the full jurisdiction of the French legal code, including laws affecting marriage and inheritance, and reject the authority of the religious courts. In effect, this meant that a Muslim had to renounce some of the mores of his religion in order to become a French citizen. This condition was bitterly resented by Muslims, for whom the only road to political equality was perceived to be apostasy. Over the next century, fewer than 3,000 Muslims chose to cross the barrier and become French citizens. A similar status applied to the Jewish natives.

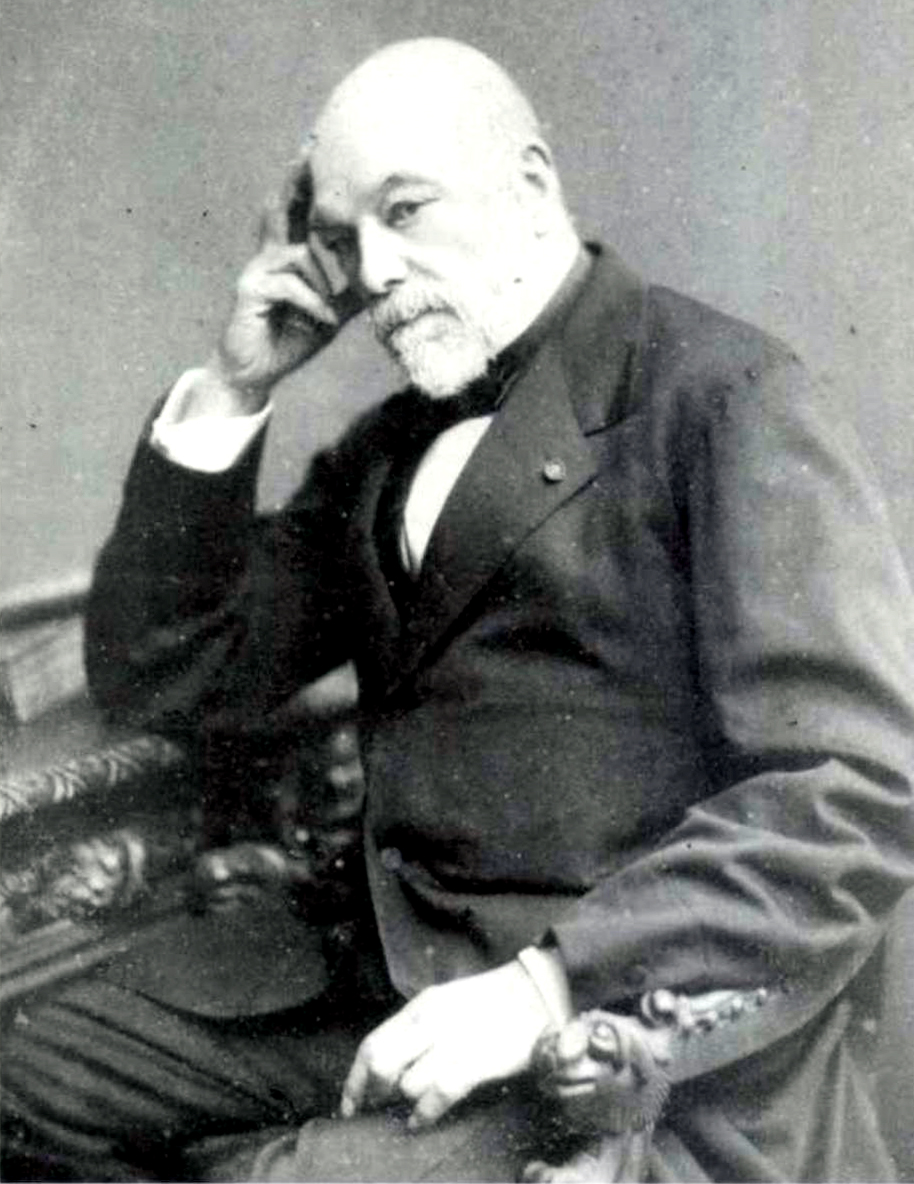
Ismael Urbain in 1868

The Arab offices were put to use in particular by a policy of de-Berberization and the generalization of the teaching of written Arabic. After the failure of the Saint-Simonian expedition in Egypt (1833), the Saint-Simonians transferred their projects of futuristic development to Algeria. In the 1860s, Algeria maintained the French taste for exoticism, especially among wealthy people and intellectuals. During the conquest of Algeria by France, the little-known population was described as "Turkish" or "Moorish", but as the conquest progressed and the French gained a deeper understanding of the country's demographics, it was increasingly referred to as "Arab".

The self-proclaimed purpose of Napoleon III's visit to Algiers in 1860 was to "attend to the well-being of the three million Arabs whom the fortunes of war have brought under our rule". Another project for the constitution of a similar Arab kingdom was proposed in Syria by General Fleury with Ismael Urbain as intermediary to Emir Abdelkader in 1865; he declined the proposal however. The policy of the Arab kingdom, motivated by Ismael Urbain, and the Saint-Simonians, was to constitute a kingdom associated with France, with its own Arab identity. The Emperor Napoleon would be the sovereign of both the French and the Arabs. Some measures are taken in favor of the natives such as the Sénatus-consulte of 1863, which aims to protect tribal rights with a reorganization of their lands in the face of the economic advance of colonization. However, some settlers opposed these provisions, which they considered too favorable for the natives.

== See also ==
- History of Algeria
- Colonial Algeria
- Languages of Algeria

== Bibliography ==
- Spillmann, Georges (1975). Napoléon III et le royaume arabe d'Algérie / par le général Georges Spillmann (in French). Académie des Sciences d'Outre-Mer.
