= Tremella steidleri =

Scientific classification
- Domain: Eukaryota
- Kingdom: Fungi
- Division: Basidiomycota
- Class: Tremellomycetes
- Order: Tremellales
- Family: Tremellaceae
- Genus: Tremella
- Species: T. steidleri

Binomial name
- Tremella steidleri (Bres.) Bourdot & Galzin (1928)

Synonyms
- Tremella encephala var. steidleri Bres. (1908)

Species of fungus

Tremella steidleri is a species of fungus in the order Tremellales and has the recommended English name brown brain. It produces brown, brain-like, gelatinous basidiocarps (fruit bodies) and is parasitic on Stereum basidiocarps on dead branches of broadleaved trees. It was originally described from the Czech Republic.

== Taxonomy ==
The species was first published in 1908 by Italian mycologist Giacomo Bresadola who named it after its collector, the Czech mycologist Emerich Steidler. Bresadola considered it a variety of the smaller, pinkish, conifer species Tremella encephala (now Naematelia encephala). It was subsequently raised to species level by French mycologists Hubert Bourdot and Amédée Galzin in 1928. As a parasite of Stereum fruit bodies, Tremella steidleri belongs in the genus Naematelia, but the species has not as yet undergone DNA sequencing to confirm this.

== Description ==
Fruit bodies are gelatinous, pustular at first becoming compact and brain-like, 30 to 60 mm across, pale to dark, dull, matt brown often with a whitish pruina. Microscopically, the hyphae have clamp connections. The basidia are tremelloid (subglobose to ellipsoid, with oblique to vertical septa) and normally stalked, 2 to 4-celled, 15 to 18 by 10 to 13 μm. The basidiospores are ellipsoid, smooth, 7.5 to 10.5 by 5.5 to 7.5 μm.

== Similar species ==
Naematelia aurantia occurs on Stereum hirsutum on broadleaved trees but is typically more lobed and bright yellow to yellow-orange. Naematelia encephala is similarly compact, but is typically smaller, pinkish, and occurs as a parasite of Stereum sanguinolentum on conifers.

== Habitat and distribution ==
Tremella steidleri is a parasite on fruit bodies of Stereum species on broadleaved trees. The type collection was on oak (Quercus species). It was described from Moravia, but occurs throughout central Europe and especially in the United Kingdom.
