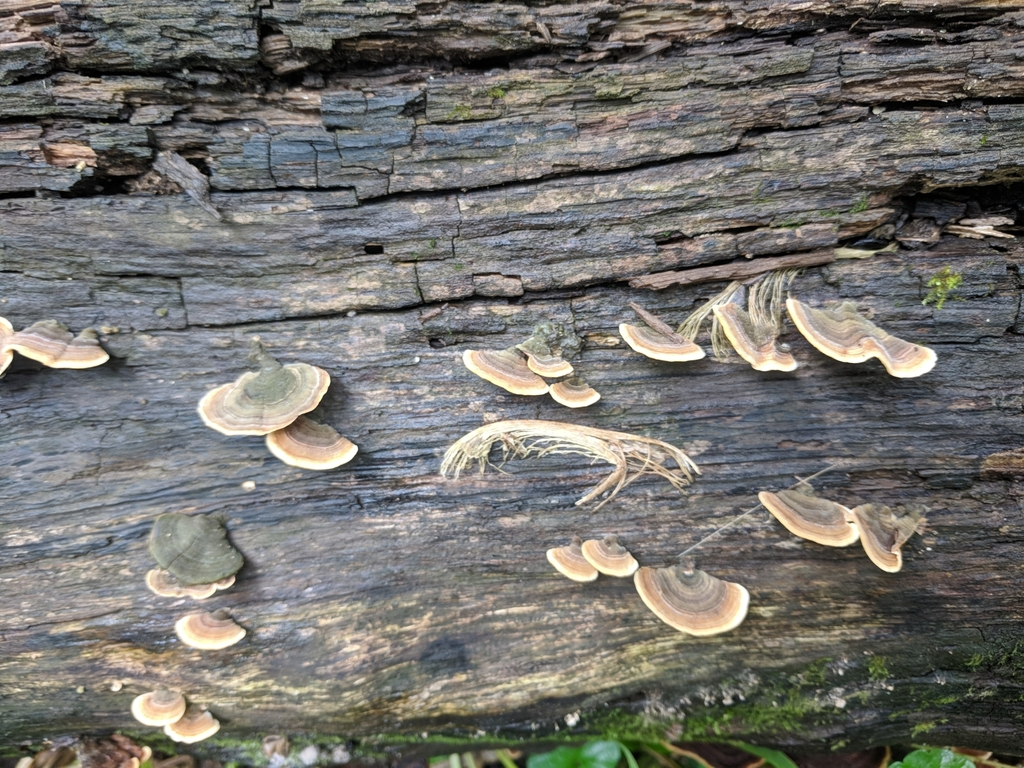

Scientific classification
- Kingdom: Fungi
- Division: Basidiomycota
- Class: Agaricomycetes
- Order: Russulales
- Family: Stereaceae
- Genus: Stereum
- Species: S. fasciatum

Binomial name
- Stereum fasciatum (Schwein.) Fr. (1838)

Synonyms
- Thelephora fasciata Schwein. (1822)

= Stereum fasciatum =

Species of fungus

Stereum fasciatum is a basidiomycete crust fungus, which means it does not have the traditional mushroom gills nor stem, but rather grows flat or with shelf-like protrusions on wood. The spores are produced on basidia, just like the gilled mushrooms, but instead of gills, the hymenophore (spore bearing surface) directly houses the reproductive parts. In North America S. fasciatum was long thought to be S. ostrea, but the recent accessibility to DNA sequencing has revealed that the two are distinct, and that S. ostrea is native to Indonesia and is not found in North America.

== Description ==
Stereum fasciatum grows in a fan-like shape with a broad base, and an upper surface that is covered in tufts of upright hairs. The overall shape, like most Stereum species, is fan or oyster-like, spreading outwards from the attachment to the wooden substrate. Unlike some similar species, when the fertile surface is bruised, it does not stain yellow.

== Similar species ==
The typical Stereum pore-less undersurface, will separate it from similar looking polypores such as turkey tails (Trametes), and thin fruiting bodies growing shelf like will separate it from most other crusts. The distinguishing features of Stereum fasciatum is the combination of the non-yellowing undersurface, broad base attachment, and the upright hairs. To see the upright hairs, a hand lens may be needed. A common way to examine the hairs is to fold a specimen in half, with the undersurface touching and splitting the hairy upper surface, and then examining the split section hairs to see if they stand up straight or are felted.

Stereum subtomentosum is a similar species, also having upright hairs and a broader attachment, but it stains yellow, which S. fasciatum does not.

Stereum lobatum is another yellowing species, but it also usually has a narrower attachment to the substrate and felted hairs instead of upright (use a hand lens).

Stereum complicatum is usually smaller, and is brighter and more consistent orange.

Stereum hirsutum can look quite similar, but is more orange and smaller.

== Taxonomy ==
It was first described in 1822 by Schweinitz as Thelephora fasciata, but in 1838 was transferred by Elias Fries to the genus, Stereum, giving the name Stereum fasciatum.
