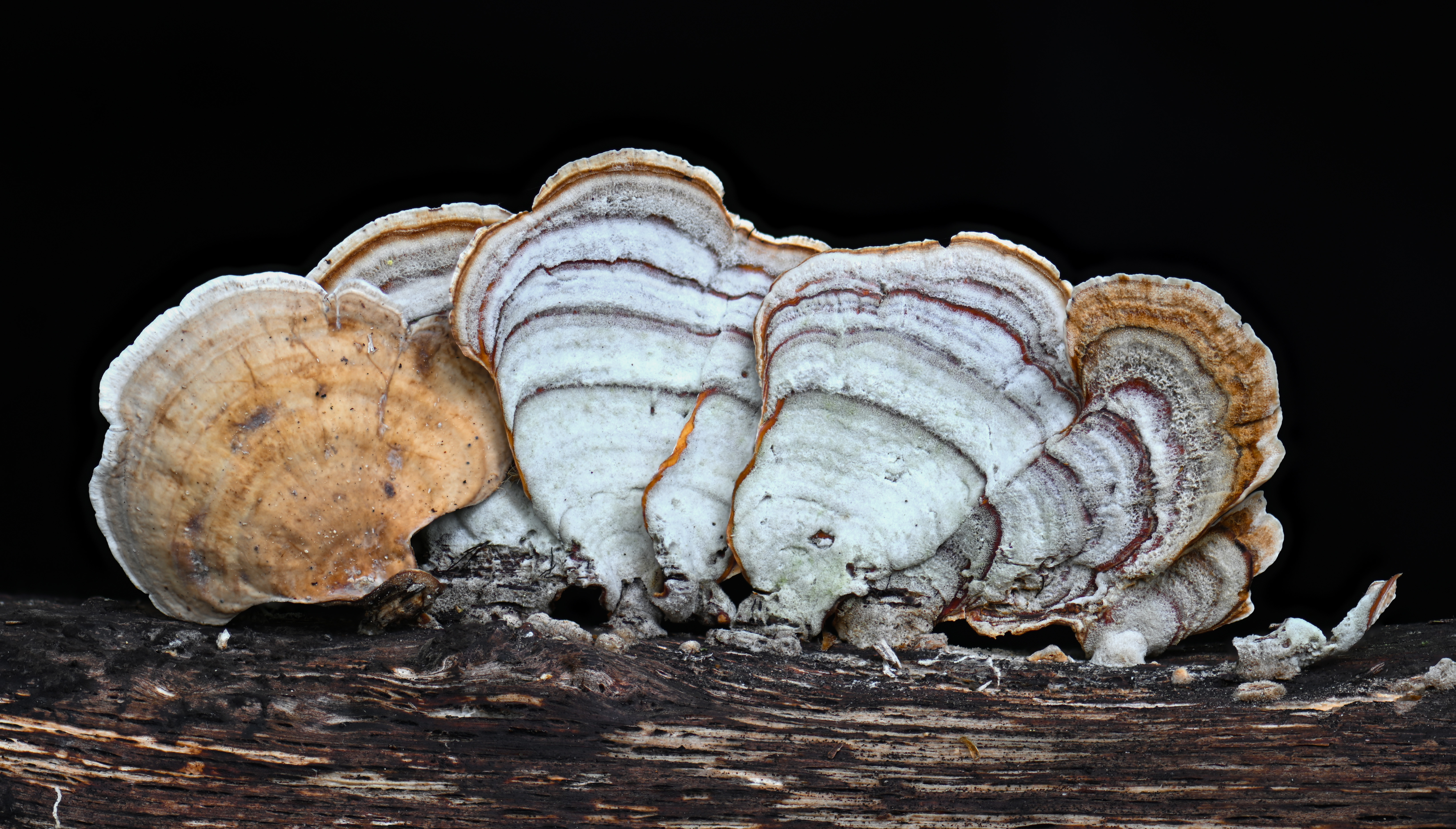
- upperside
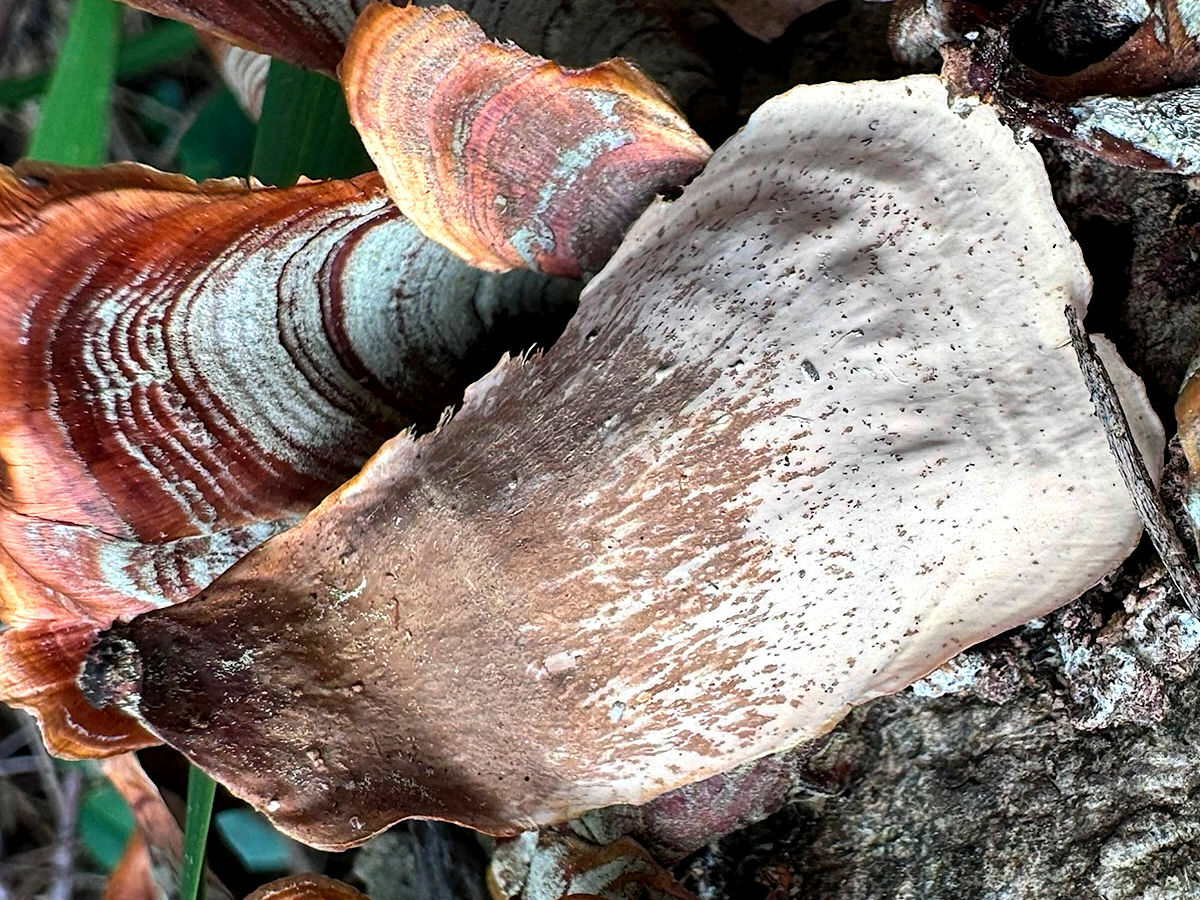
- underside

Scientific classification
- Kingdom: Fungi
- Division: Basidiomycota
- Class: Agaricomycetes
- Order: Russulales
- Family: Stereaceae
- Genus: Stereum
- Species: S. lobatum

Binomial name
- Stereum lobatum (Kunze ex Fr.) Fr. 1838

= Stereum lobatum =

Species of fungus

Stereum lobatum (false turkeytail) is a basidiomycete crust fungus, which means it does not have the traditional mushroom gills nor stem, but rather grows flat or with shelf-like protrusions on wood. The spores are produced on basidia, just like the gilled mushrooms, but instead of gills, the hymenophore (spore-bearing surface) directly houses the reproductive parts.

In North America S. lobatum was long thought to be S. ostrea, but the recent accessibility to DNA sequencing has revealed that the two are distinct, and that S. ostrea is native to Indonesia and is not found in North America.

== Description ==
Stereum lobatum grows in a fan-like shape with a narrowed base, and an upper surface that becomes zonate due to the felted hairs falling off and revealing the brown colour underneath. The overall shape, like most Stereum species, is fan or oyster-like, spreading outwards from the attachment to the wooden substrate. The cap is 1.5–8 centimetres (1/2–3 in) wide and the flesh is tough and thin. The spore print is white.

When bruised the pale brownish yellow will turn a bright yellow. Sometimes it may help to wet the bruised area to see the color change.

=== Similar species ===
The typical Stereum pore-less undersurface, will separate it from similar looking polypores such as Trametes (turkey tails), and thin fruiting bodies growing shelf like will separate it from most other crusts. The distinguishing features of S. lobatum is the combination of the yellow undersurface bruising, narrow base attachment, and the felted hairs. To see the felted hairs, a hand lens may be needed. A common way to examine the hairs is to fold a specimen in half, with the undersurface touching and splitting the hairy upper surface, and then examining the split section hairs to see if they stand up straight or are felted (as they are with S. lobatum).

Stereum subtomentosum is also a yellowing species, but the hairs are straight (as seen when folded and magnified with a hand lens), and the base has a usually broader attachment then S. lobatum.

Stereum fasciatum looks similar but does not stain yellow.

Stereum complicatum is usually smaller, does not stain yellow, and is brighter and more consistent orange.

Stereum hirsutum is also usually smaller and does not stain yellow.

Stereum ostrea is almost identical, apart from the fact that current studies show that it does not grow in North America.

== Habitat and distribution ==
It grows on dead hardwood. It is found in Eastern North America and is likely pantropical.
