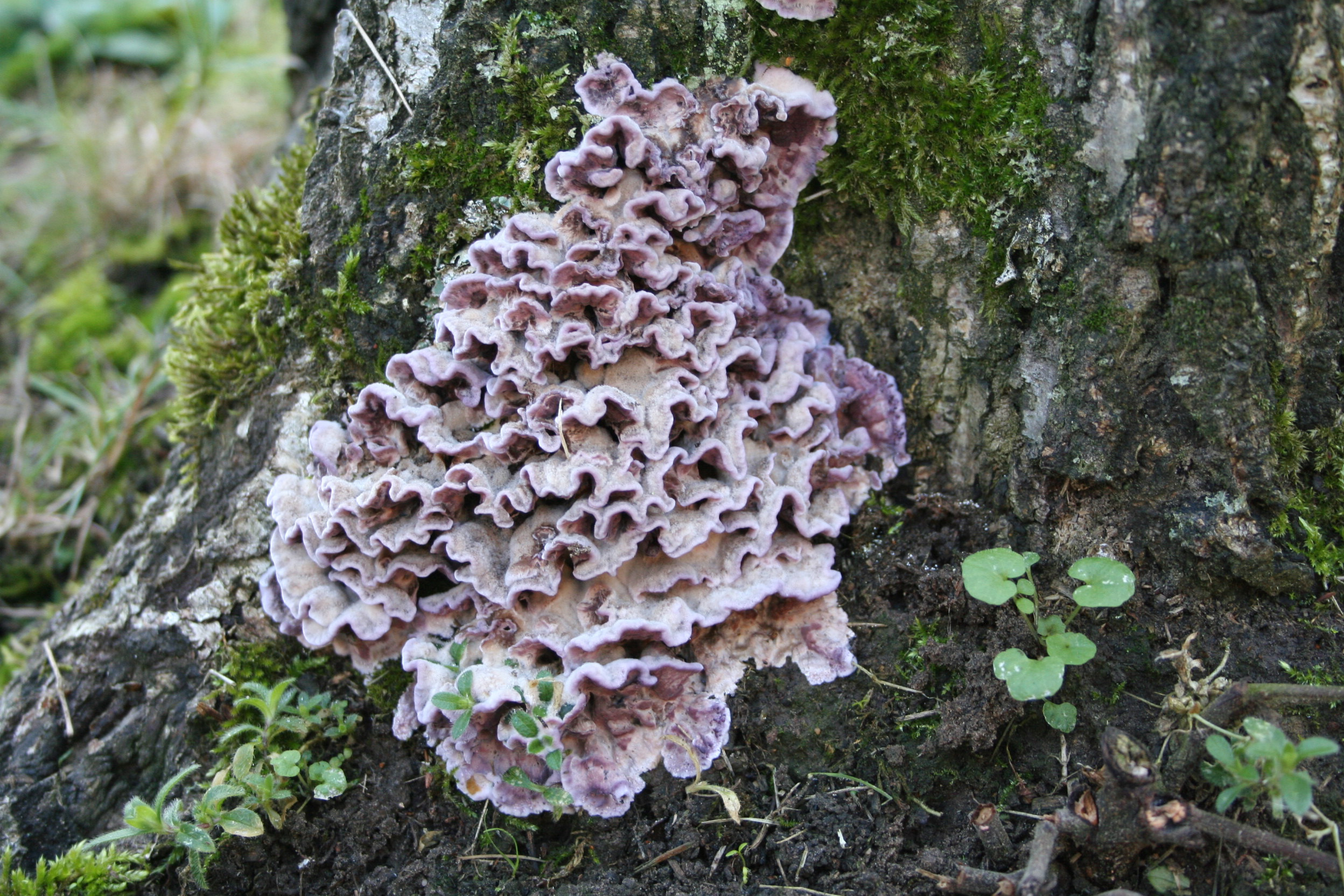
- Fruiting bodies of C. purpureum in a garden near Paris, France

Scientific classification
- Kingdom: Fungi
- Division: Basidiomycota
- Class: Agaricomycetes
- Order: Agaricales
- Family: Cyphellaceae
- Genus: Chondrostereum
- Species: C. purpureum

Binomial name
- Chondrostereum purpureum (Pers.) Pouzar (1959)

Synonyms
- Auricularia persistens Corticium nyssae Phylacteria micheneri Stereum ardoisiacum Stereum argentinum Stereum atrozonatum Stereum lilacinum var. vorticosum Stereum micheneri Stereum nipponicum Stereum pergameneum Stereum purpureum Stereum rugosiusculum Stereum vorticosum Terana nyssae Thelephora purpurea

= Chondrostereum purpureum =

Chondrostereum purpureum is a fungal plant pathogen which causes silver leaf disease of trees. It attacks most species of the rose family Rosaceae, particularly the genus Prunus. The disease is progressive and often fatal. The common name is taken from the progressive silvering of leaves on affected branches. It is spread by airborne spores landing on freshly exposed sapwood. For this reason cherries and plums are pruned in summer, when spores are least likely to be present and when disease is visible. Silver leaf can also occur on poming fruits like apples and pears; plums are especially vulnerable.

== Taxonomy ==
In the past the name Stereum purpureum Pers. was widely used for this fungus, but according to modern taxonomy it is only distantly related to Stereum, actually belonging to order Agaricales whereas Stereum is in order Russulales.

== Description ==
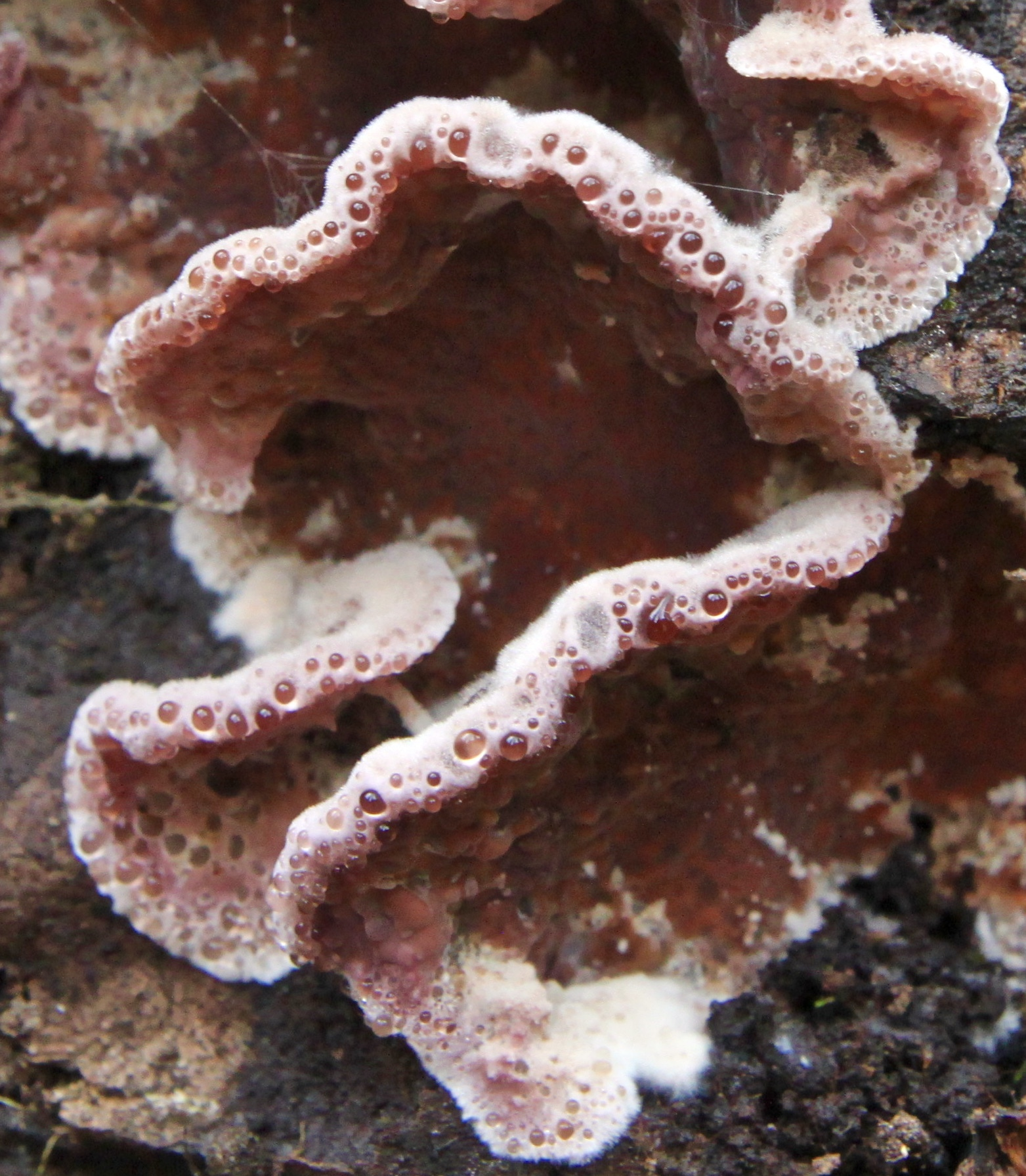
A guttating fruiting body

It is a pathogen of various, mostly deciduous trees including species of Acer, Aesculus, Alnus, Betula, Crataegus, Fagus, Larix, Malus, Ostrya, Picea, Populus, Prunus, Salix, and Sorbus.

After starting as just a crust on the wood, the fruiting structure develops undulating intergrowing brackets up to about 3 cm broad, which have a tough rubbery texture. The edges and fertile lower surfaces show a fairly vivid violet colour while the fungus is growing, and the upper surfaces have a grey aspect (sometimes with zonation and usually a lighter edge) and are covered with whitish hairs. After a week or two the fructification dries out, becomes brittle, and turns a drab brown or beige. Infected wood can be recognized because it is stained a darker tint.

The spores are rounded cylinders approximately 5–8 μm x 3–4 μm in size. The hyphal structure is monomitic with clamp connections.

It is often found on old stumps and dead wood, but can also be a serious parasite of living trees. As well as plum trees it attacks many other broad-leafed species (other Prunus, apple, pear, willow, poplar, maple, hornbeam, plane, oak, elm, lilac, and many others). Occasionally it also infects conifers (e.g. fir, spruce, and Thuja). Geographically it is roughly just as widespread as its hosts; it is common in woods, orchards and tree plantations in temperate climates.

=== Similar species ===
Amylostereum areolatum is considered to be similar, and usually has moss covering its cap. Phlebiopsis crassa does not form caps, while members of Trichaptum form a continuous surface covered by teeth or pores.

== As a human pathogen ==
A single case report confirmed human infection with Chondrostereum purpureum in a non immunocompromised man who had been working with infected plant material. It was resolved by treating him with antifungal medication, but indicates potential for a broader host range for plant fungus than previously believed.

== Mycoherbicide ==
Chondrostereum purpureum is commercially available as a method of combatting forest 'weed trees' such as aspens, beech, birches, maples, pin cherry, poplars, and other species. The fungus is applied directly to the weed trees in a nutrient paste which can be stored and handled conveniently.

The first regulatory approval was granted in 2001 to Myco-Forestis Corporation and targeted species "including birch, pin-cherry, poplar/aspen, red maple, sugar maple, and speckled alder in the Boreal and Mixed forest regions of Canada, east of the Rocky Mountains". It had not been reported as of 2001 to cause any diseases in coniferous tree species but apparently does.

According to a 2007 regulatory decision of the Canadian Pest Management Regulatory Agency, the use of this control method in paste form on Sitka spruce and red alder will only have a limited impact on non-target trees since the fungal spores are ubiquitous anyway and healthy trees are resistant to attack.
