= List of Chinese mushrooms and fungi =

East Asian mushrooms and fungi are often used in East Asian cuisine, either fresh or dried. According to Chinese traditional medicine, many types of mushroom affect the eater's physical and emotional wellbeing.

== List of mushrooms and fungi ==
Scientific names	Commonly used names	Image	Traditional Chinese	Simplified Chinese	Pinyin	Literal meaning	Notes, other Chinese names
Cyclocybe aegerita	poplar mushroom, velvet pioppino		茶樹菇	茶树菇	cháshùgū	tea tree mushroom	
Auricularia heimuer	wood ear, cloud ear		黑木耳	黑木耳	hēimù'ěr	black wood ear	Also known as 雲耳 / 云耳 (pinyin: yún'ěr; lit. 'cloud ear')
Auricularia cornea	hairy wood ear		毛木耳	毛木耳	máomù'ěr	hairy wood ear	Similar to wood ears, but coarser. Generally used in soups.
Pleurotus giganteus			豬肚菇	猪肚菇	zhūdǔgū	pig stomach mushroom	
Coprinus comatus	shaggy ink cap		雞腿菇	鸡腿菇	jītuǐgū	chicken leg mushroom	
Dacrymyces spathularia	sweet osmanthus ear		桂花耳	桂花耳	guìhuā'ěr	osmanthus ear	Used in Buddha's delight.
Flammulina filiformis	enoki, enokitake		金(針)菇	金(针)菇	jīn(zhēn)gū	gold (needle) mushroom	Cultivated variety shown, wild differs in appearance.
Ganoderma lingzhi	reishi		靈芝	灵芝	língzhī		Very bitter but believed to be medicinally highly potent. Often made into a tea or broth with Chinese wolfberries.
Gloeostereum incarnatum			榆耳	榆耳	yú'ěr	elm ear	Used in Buddha's delight.
Hericium erinaceus, Hericium coralloides	lion's mane mushroom, bearded tooth mushroom		猴頭菇	猴头菇	hóutóugū	monkey head mushroom	
Hypsizygus tessulatus	beech mushroom		蟹味菇	蟹味菇	xièwèigū	crab flavor mushroom	
Lentinula edodes	shiitake		香菇	香菇	xiānggū	fragrant mushroom	
Termitomyces spp.	termite mushroom		雞㙡 / 雞肉絲菇	鸡𭎂 (Note: Commonly typesetted as 鸡枞 or 鸡㙡 to work around digital technical limitations.) / 鸡肉丝菇	jīzōng / jīròusīgū	chicken meat strip mushroom (name #2)	
Phallus indusiatus	bamboo mushroom		竹蓀	竹荪	zhúsūn		Considered an aphrodisiac. Used in chicken soups.
Pleurotus eryngii	king oyster mushroom		杏鮑菇	杏鲍菇	xìngbàogū	apricot abalone mushroom	
Pleurotus ostreatus	oyster mushroom		平菇	平菇	pínggū	flat mushroom	Also known as 蠔菇 / 蚝菇 (pinyin: háogū; lit. 'oyster mushroom')
Russula virescens	green brittlegill		青頭菌	青头菌	qīngtóujùn	green-headed mushroom	
Thelephora ganbajun	ganbajun		乾巴菌	干巴菌	gānbājùn	ganba mushroom	A highly prized mushroom. Named after 牛干巴 / 牛乾巴 (pinyin: niú gānbā) — a Yunnanese specialty of dried beef — for the similar flavor.
Naematelia sinensis			金耳	金耳	jīn'ěr	golden ear	Used in Buddha's delight. Also known as 黃耳 / 黄耳 (pinyin: huáng'ěr; lit. 'yellow ear')
Tremella fuciformis	silver ear fungus, snow fungus		銀耳	银耳	yín'ěr	silver ear	Also known as 雪耳 (pinyin: xuě'ěr; lit. 'snow ear') and 白木耳 (pinyin: báimù'ěr; lit. 'white wood ear')
Tricholoma matsutake	matsutake		松茸	松茸	sōngróng	pine mushroom	Expensive delicacy, especially highly prized in Japan.
Volvariella volvacea	paddy straw mushroom		草菇	草菇	cǎogū	grass mushroom	

== See also ==
- List of mushroom dishes
