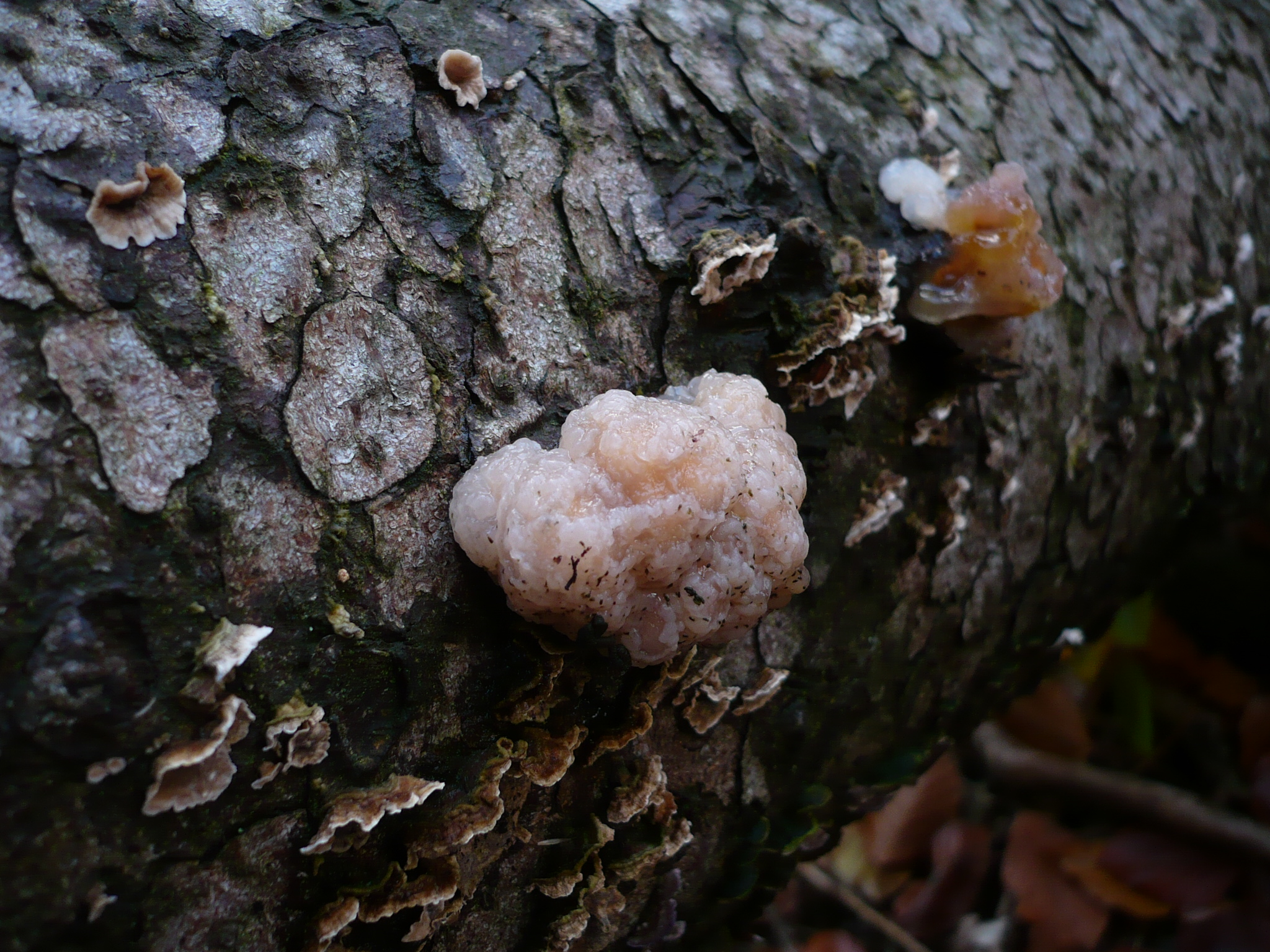
- Gelatinous fruit body of Naematelia encephala with its host Stereum sanguinolentum

Scientific classification
- Kingdom: Fungi
- Division: Basidiomycota
- Class: Tremellomycetes
- Order: Tremellales
- Family: Naemateliaceae
- Genus: Naematelia; Fr.

Type species
- Naematelia encephala (Pers.) Fr.

Synonyms
- Encephalium Link

= Naematelia =

Genus of fungi

Naematelia is a genus of fungi in the family Naemateliaceae. All Naematelia species are parasites of other fungi (Stereum species) and produce anamorphic yeast states. When produced, basidiocarps (fruit bodies), are gelatinous and are colloquially classed among the "jelly fungi." Several species of Naematelia are currently recognized worldwide. One species, Naematelia aurantialba, is commercially cultivated for food. Recent taxonomic studies have clarified species boundaries within the Naematelia aurantialba complex, including the description of additional species from China.

== Taxonomy ==
=== History ===
Naematelia was introduced in 1816 by Elias Magnus Fries for fungal fruit bodies with a gelatinous outer layer and a hard inner core, as in the type species Naematelia encephala. Some mycologists subsequently used the name, while others considered Naematelia synonymous with Tremella since its basidia were Tremella-like. In a 1961 paper, American mycologist Robert Bandoni showed that the hard inner core of Naematelia encephala was composed largely of host tissue (Stereum sanguinolentum) and that Naematelia, therefore, represented no more than a Tremella species and its host.

However, molecular research, based on cladistic analysis of DNA sequences, has shown that Tremella is polyphyletic (and hence artificial).

Therefore, a different generic name was required for a group of species not closely related to Tremella mesenterica (the type species of Tremella), and in 2015 Naematelia was selected as the earliest such name available. Comparatively few species, however, have yet to be sequenced.

== Description ==
Fruit bodies are gelatinous (but may have a hard inner core mainly composed of host hyphae) and are variously cephaliform (like a brain, with folds and ridges), lobed, or foliose (with leaf-like or seaweed-like fronds). Colors are typically pinkish, ochraceous, yellow, or brown.

=== Microscopic characters ===
Naematelia species produce clamped hyphae and have haustorial cells from which hyphal filaments seek out and penetrate the hyphae of the host. The basidia are "tremelloid" (globose to ellipsoid, sometimes stalked, and vertically or diagonally septate), giving rise to long, sinuous sterigmata or epibasidia on which the basidiospores are produced. These spores are smooth, globose to ellipsoid, and germinate by hyphal tube or yeast cells. Conidiophores are often present, producing conidiospores that are similar to yeast cells.

== Habitat and distribution ==
Species are parasitic on fruit bodies of Stereum species that grow on dead attached or fallen wood. Hosts include Stereum hirsutum on broadleaf trees and Stereum sanguinolentum on conifers.

As a group, Naematelia species occur worldwide, though individual species may have a more restricted distribution.

== Species and hosts ==
Image	Name	Distribution	Host
	Naematelia aurantia	Asia, Australasia, Europe, North & South America	Stereum hirsutum
	Naematelia aurantialba	China	Stereum hirsutum
	Naematelia encephala	Asia, Australasia, Europe, North America	Stereum sanguinolentum
	Naematelia encephaloidea	India	Stereum species
	Naematelia microspora	South Africa	Stereum species
	Naematelia nodulosa	China	Stereum species
	Naematelia pedicellata	China	Stereum species
	Naematelia sinensis	China	Stereum hirsutum
