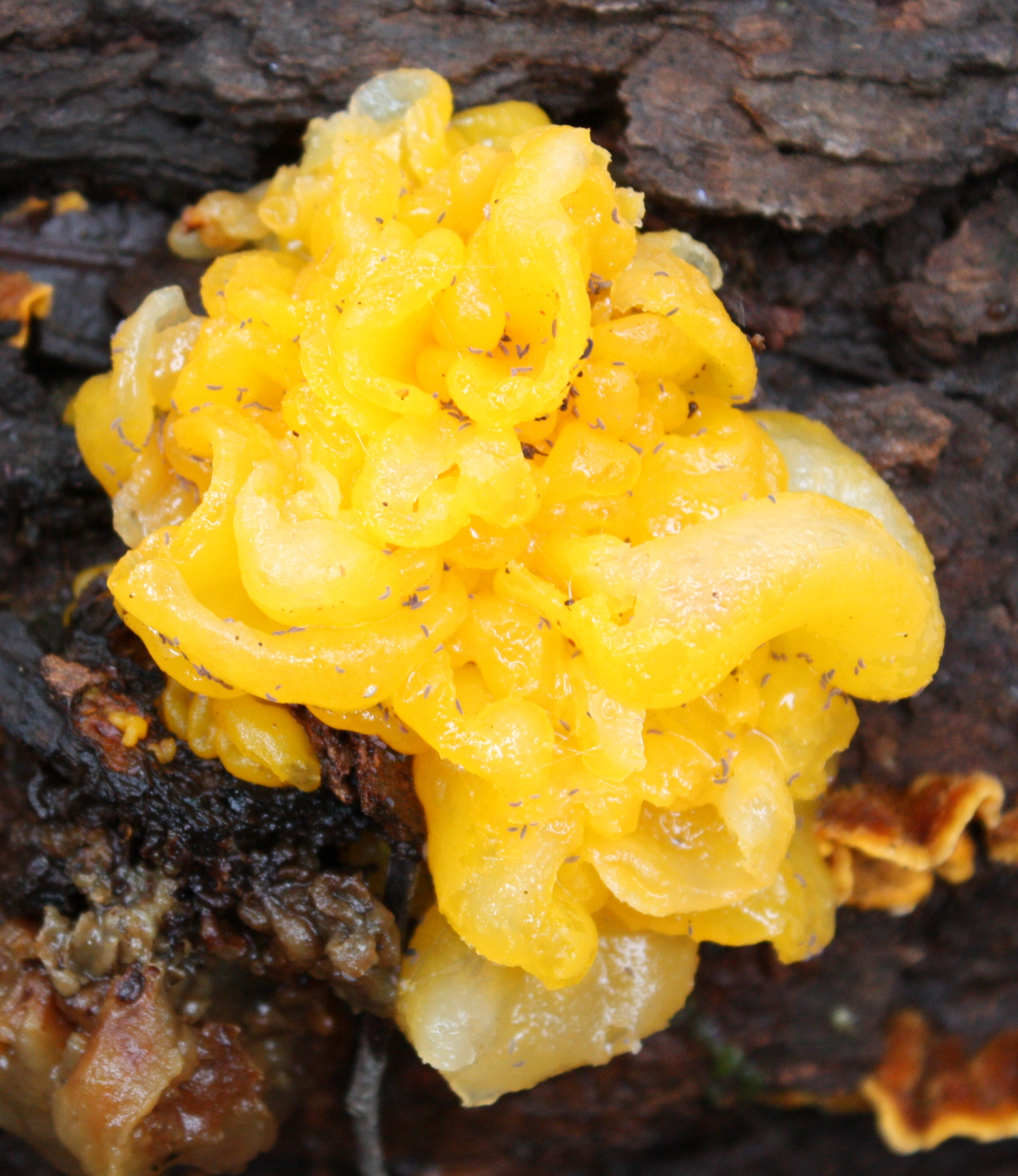
- Naematelia aurantia with Stereum host

Scientific classification
- Kingdom: Fungi
- Division: Basidiomycota
- Class: Tremellomycetes
- Order: Tremellales
- Family: Naemateliaceae
- Genus: Naematelia
- Species: N. aurantia

Binomial name
- Naematelia aurantia (Schwein.) Burt (1921)

Synonyms
- Tremella aurantia Schwein. (1822)

= Naematelia aurantia =

Species of yellow, parasitic fungus

Naematelia aurantia (synonym Tremella aurantia) is a species of fungus producing yellow, frondose, gelatinous basidiocarps (fruit bodies). It is widespread in north temperate regions and is parasitic on another species of fungus (Stereum hirsutum) that grows on dead attached and recently fallen branches of broadleaf trees. It is commonly called golden ear in North America.

== Taxonomy ==
Tremella aurantia was first published in 1822 by German-American mycologist Lewis David de Schweinitz, based on collections from North Carolina. In 1921, the species was transferred to Naematelia by Edward Angus Burt, but remained better known as Tremella aurantia until molecular research, based on cladistic analysis of DNA sequences, showed that Naematelia was a distinct genus.

The epithet aurantia means "golden".

== Description ==
Fruit bodies are gelatinous, bright yellow, up to 15 cm (6 in) across, and lobed to frondose (like seaweed). Microscopically, the hyphae are clamped and occur within a dense gelatinous matrix. Haustorial cells arise on the hyphae, producing filaments that attach to and penetrate the unclamped hyphae of the host. The basidia are tremelloid (spherical to ellipsoid, with oblique to vertical septa), 13–14 by 9–13 μm, sometimes stalked. The basidiospores are subglobose to ellipsoid, smooth, 5.5–9.5 by 4.5–7.5 μm, and germinate by hyphal tube or by yeast cells.

== Similar species ==
Naematelia aurantialba is a very similar species cultivated for food and medicine in China. It was only described in 1990 and differs largely in microscopic details. Tremella mesenterica is a widespread, north temperate fungus that also has bright yellow, gelatinous fruit bodies, but parasitizes the mycelium of Peniophora species, often on dead attached twigs. It too can be distinguished by microscopy, with N. aurantia having smaller spores and basidia.

Macroscopically, Dacrymyces chrysospermus is nearly identical to N. aurantia, but belongs to the class Dacrymycetes and can be distinguished by its growth on conifer and its differently shaped spores and basidia.

== Habitat and distribution ==
Naematelia aurantia is a parasite of Stereum hirsutum, growing on and often completely enveloping host basidiocarps. Following its host, fruit bodies are typically found on dead, attached or recently fallen branches of broadleaf trees.

The species has a mainly north temperate distribution and is known throughout North and South America, Europe, and northern Asia.
