= Setigeroclavula =

Scientific classification
- Kingdom: Fungi
- Division: Basidiomycota
- Class: Agaricomycetes
- Order: Agaricales
- Family: Cyphellaceae
- Genus: Setigeroclavula; R.H.Petersen (1988)

Type species
- Setigeroclavula ascendens R.H.Petersen (1988)

Family of fungi

Setigeroclavula is a genus of fungi in the family Cyphellaceae. A monotypic genus, it consists of the single clavarioid species Setigeroclavula ascendens, found on the dead rachis of mother spleenwort (Asplenium bulbiferum) in New Zealand. Both the genus and species were described in 1988 by American mycologist Ron Petersen. The small, club-shaped fruitbodies are densely studded with erect hairs. The hyphal system is monomitic; the spores are smooth and hyaline (translucent).
