= Granulobasidium vellereum =

Scientific classification
- Domain: Eukaryota
- Kingdom: Fungi
- Division: Basidiomycota
- Class: Agaricomycetes
- Order: Agaricales
- Family: Cyphellaceae
- Genus: Granulobasidium
- Species: G. vellereum

Binomial name
- Granulobasidium vellereum (Ellis & Cragin) Jülich (1979)

Synonyms
- Corticium vellereum Ellis & Cragin (1885); Corticium bresadolae Bourdot (1910); Hypochnicium vellereum (Ellis & Cragin) Parmasto (1968); Terana vellerea (Ellis & Cragin) Kuntze (1891)

Species of fungus

Granulobasidium vellereum is a species of fungus in the family Cyphellaceae. A plant pathogen associated with white rot of angiospermous logs, slash, and living trees, it has been found in Sweden and Denmark, and in North America. Originally described as Corticium vellereum in 1885, it was transferred to the genus Granulobasidium by Walter Jülich in 1979.
