= Buddha's delight =

Vegetarian dish in Buddhist cuisine

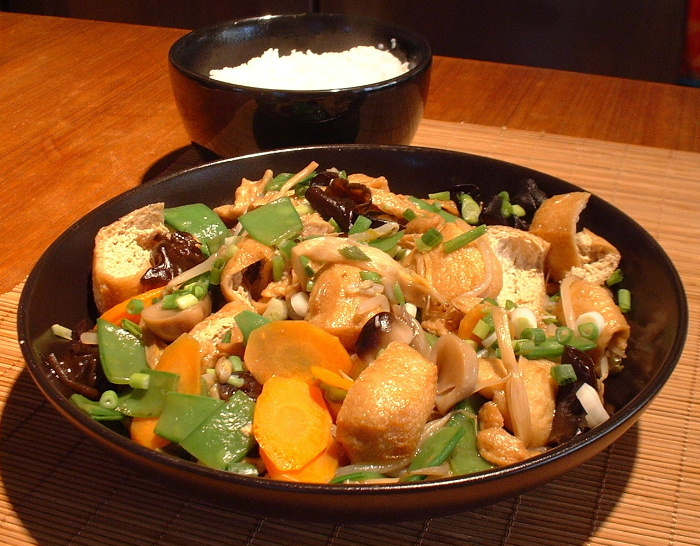
- Alternative names: Luóhàn zhāi, lo han jai, lo hon jai, Luóhàn cài
- Course: Main dishes
- Place of origin: China
- Main ingredients: various edible plants, fungi and soy sauce

Buddha's delight
- Traditional Chinese: 羅漢齋
- Simplified Chinese: 罗汉斋
- Jyutping: lo4 hon3 zaai1
- Literal meaning: Arhat vegetarian food
Transcriptions
Standard Mandarin
- Hanyu Pinyin: luóhàn zhāi
Yue: Cantonese
- Jyutping: lo4 hon3 zaai1
Southern Min
- Hokkien POJ: lô-hàn-tsai

Buddha's delight, often transliterated as Luóhàn zhāi (simplified Chinese: 罗汉斋; traditional Chinese: 羅漢齋, Japanese: rakansai (羅漢斎, 羅漢菜, 羅漢齋, らかんさい)), lo han jai, or lo hon jai, is a vegetarian dish well known in Chinese and Buddhist cuisine. It is sometimes also called Luóhàn cài (simplified Chinese: 罗汉菜; traditional Chinese: 羅漢菜).

The dish is traditionally enjoyed by Buddhist monks who are vegetarians, but it has also grown in popularity throughout the world as a common dish available as a vegetarian option in Chinese restaurants. The dish consists of various vegetables and other vegetarian ingredients (sometimes with the addition of seafood or eggs), which are cooked in soy sauce-based liquid with other seasonings until tender. The specific ingredients used vary greatly both inside and outside Asia.

== Etymology ==
In the name luóhàn zhāi, luóhàn – short for Ā luóhàn (simplified Chinese: 阿罗汉; traditional Chinese: 阿羅漢; pinyin: Ā LuóHàn) – is the Chinese transliteration of the Sanskrit arhat, meaning an enlightened, ascetic individual or the Buddha himself. Zhāi (simplified Chinese: 斋; traditional Chinese: 齋; pinyin: zhāi; Jyutping: zaai1) means "vegetarian food" or "vegetarian diet."

The dish is usually made with at least 10 ingredients, although more elaborate versions may comprise 18 or even 35 ingredients. If 18 ingredients are used, the dish is called luóhàn quánzhāi (simplified: 罗汉全斋; traditional: 羅漢全齋; Jyutping: lo4hon3 cyun4zaai1).

In China and Hong Kong, when served exclusively using only the most flavor-packed vegetarian ingredients, such as pickled tofu or sweet bean curds, it is known as tián suān zhāi (simplified Chinese: 甜酸斋; traditional Chinese: 甜酸齋; literally "sweet and sour vegetarian dish").

== Tradition ==
As suggested by its name, it is a dish traditionally enjoyed by Buddhists, but it has also grown in popularity throughout the world as a common dish available in Chinese restaurants (though often not including all of the ingredients) as a vegetarian option. It is traditionally served in Chinese households on the first day of the Chinese New Year, stemming from the old Buddhist practice that one should maintain a vegetarian diet in the first five days of the new year, as a form of self-purification. Some of the rarer ingredients, such as fat choy and arrowhead, are generally eaten only at this time of year.

Traditionally eggs and dairy are not permitted.

Alliums and some other vegetables (simplified Chinese: 五荤; traditional Chinese: 五葷; pinyin: wǔ hūn: garlic, leek, scallion, shallot, asafoetida) are not used in Buddha's delight, as they are frowned upon in Buddhist cuisine.

== Ingredients ==
The following is a list of ingredients often used in Buddha's delight, each of which, according to Chinese tradition, is ascribed a particular auspicious significance. As the dish varies from chef to chef and family to family, not every ingredient is always used in every version of the dish.

=== Main ingredients ===
==== Commonly used main ingredients ====
- Arrowhead (慈菇 or 茨菰; pinyin: cígū)
- Bamboo fungus (竹笙, pinyin: zhúshēng or 竹荪; pinyin: zhúsūn)
- Bamboo shoots (simplified: 笋; traditional; 筍; pinyin: sǔn)
- Bean curd sticks (腐竹; pinyin: fǔzhú; also called "tofu bamboo")
- Black mushrooms (冬菇; pinyin: dōnggū)
- Carrot (traditional: 胡蘿蔔; simplified: 胡萝卜, pinyin: hú luóbo; or traditional: 紅蘿蔔; simplified: 红萝卜, pinyin: hóng luóbo; Jyutping: hung4 lo4baak6)
- Cellophane noodles (粉絲; pinyin: fěnsī; also called "bean threads")
- Daylily buds (金针; pinyin: jīnzhēn; also called "golden needles")
- Fat choy (traditional: 髮菜; simplified: 发菜; pinyin: fàcài; a black hair-like cyanobacterium)
- Ginkgo nuts (traditional: 銀杏; simplified: 银杏, pinyin: yínxìng; or 白果, pinyin: báiguǒ)
- Lotus seeds (蓮子; pinyin: liánzǐ)
- Napa cabbage (大白菜; pinyin: dà báicài)
- Peanuts (花生; pinyin: huāshēng)
- Snow peas (traditional: 荷蘭豆; simplified: 荷兰豆; pinyin: hélán-dòu)
- Fried tofu (炸豆腐; pinyin: zhá dòufǔ)
- Water chestnuts (traditional: 荸薺; simplified: 荸荠; pinyin: bíqí)
- Fried or braised wheat gluten (traditional: 麵筋, simplified: 面筋; pinyin: miànjīn)
- Wood ear (木耳; pinyin: mù ěr; also called black fungus)

==== Less commonly used main ingredients ====
- Bean sprouts (豆芽, pinyin: dòuyá; 芽菜, pinyin: yácài; or 银芽, pinyin: yínyá)
- Bracken fern tips (蕨菜; pinyin: juécài)
- Bok choy (白菜; pinyin: báicài)
- Cauliflower (菜花; pinyin: cài huā)
- Chinese celery (芹菜; pinyin: qín cài)
- Other types of fungus, including cloud ear fungus (traditional: 雲耳; simplified: 云耳; pinyin: yún ěr), elm ear fungus (榆耳; pinyin: yú ěr), osmanthus ear fungus (桂花耳; pinyin: guíhuā ěr), snow fungus (银耳; pinyin: yín ěr), and golden ear mushroom (金耳, pinyin: jīn'ěr, "golden ear"; or 黃耳, pinyin: huáng'ěr, "yellow ear") See also: List of Chinese mushrooms and fungi.
- Red jujubes (traditional: 紅棗; simplified: 红枣; pinyin: hóng zǎo)
- Lotus root (藕; pinyin: ǒu)
- Other types of mushrooms, including straw mushrooms (草菇, pinyin: cǎogū), oyster mushrooms (平菇, pinyin: pínggū), and Tricholoma mushrooms (口蘑, pinyin: kǒumó)
- Potato (马铃薯; pinyin: mălíngshǔ)
- Laminaria
- Cornflower buds
- Baby corn

=== Seasonings ===
- Ginger (simplified: 姜; traditional: 薑; pinyin: jiāng)
- Monosodium glutamate (味精; pinyin: wèijīng)
- Vegetable oil (usually peanut, 花生油; or sesame, 芝麻油)
- Vegetarian oyster sauce (simplified: 斋蚝油; traditional: 齋蠔油; pinyin: zhāi háoyóu)
- Pickled tofu (豆腐乳; pinyin: dòufu rǔ; both red and white)
- Salt (traditional: 鹽; simplified: 盐; pinyin: yán)
- Dark soy sauce (老抽; pinyin: lǎochōu)
- Starch (淀粉; pinyin: diànfěn)
- Sugar (糖; pinyin: táng)

== See also ==
- List of Chinese dishes
