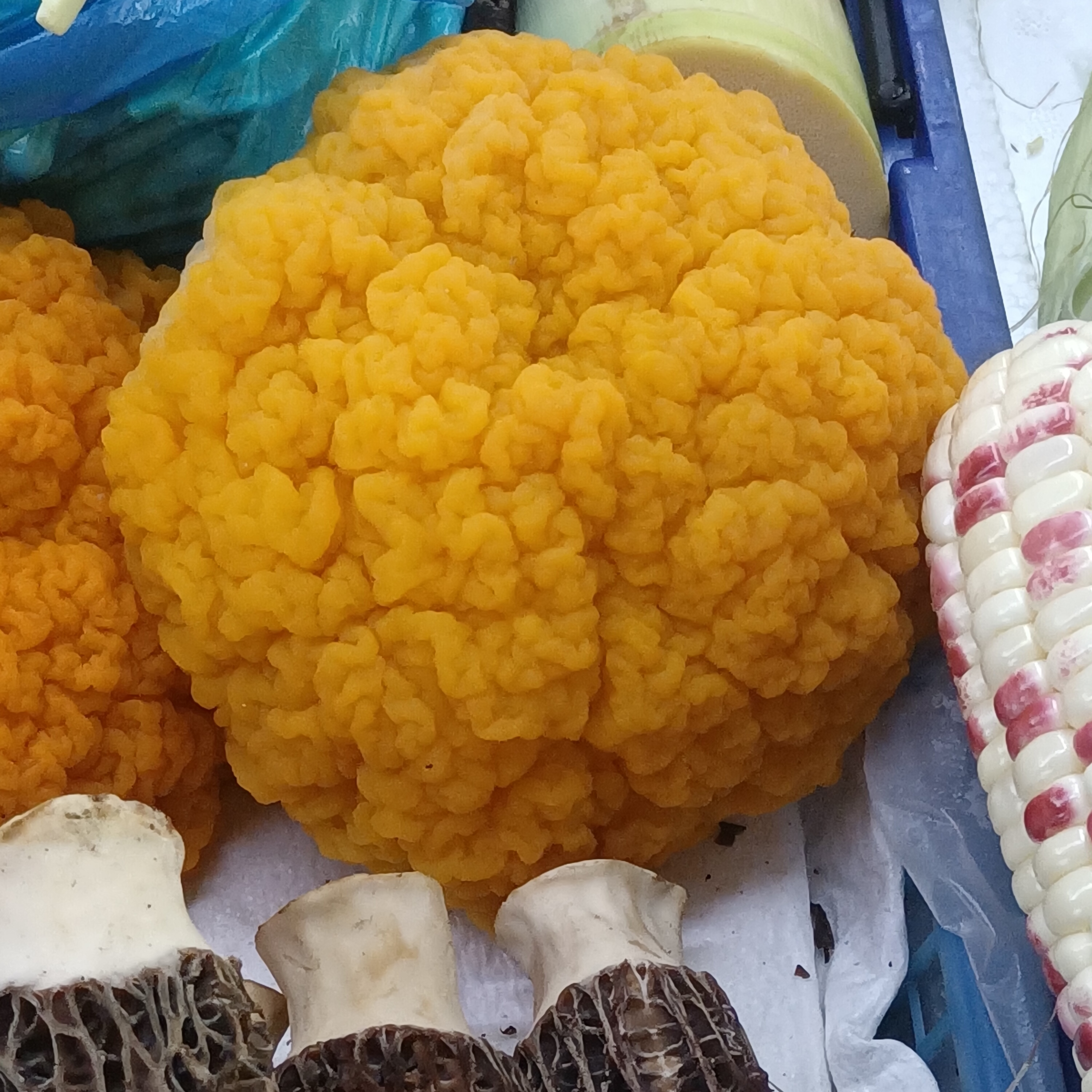
- Cultivated basidiocarp

Scientific classification
- Kingdom: Fungi
- Division: Basidiomycota
- Class: Tremellomycetes
- Order: Tremellales
- Family: Naemateliaceae
- Genus: Naematelia
- Species: N. aurantialba

Binomial name
- Naematelia aurantialba (Bandoni & M.Zang) Millanes & Wedin (2015)

Synonyms
- Tremella aurantialba Bandoni & M.Zang (1990)

= Naematelia aurantialba =

Species of fungus

Naematelia aurantialba (synonym Tremella aurantialba) is a species of fungus producing yellow, frondose, gelatinous basidiocarps (fruit bodies) parasitic on fruit bodies of another fungus, Stereum hirsutum, on broadleaf trees. In China, where it is called jīn'ěr (金耳; literally "golden ear"), it is cultivated for both food and medical purposes.

== Taxonomy ==
Recent molecular phylogenetic studies have shown that specimens historically identified as Naematelia aurantialba in China represent a species complex comprising multiple distinct taxa. This has led to the description of additional species, including Naematelia sinensis, and a refinement of species boundaries within the complex.
