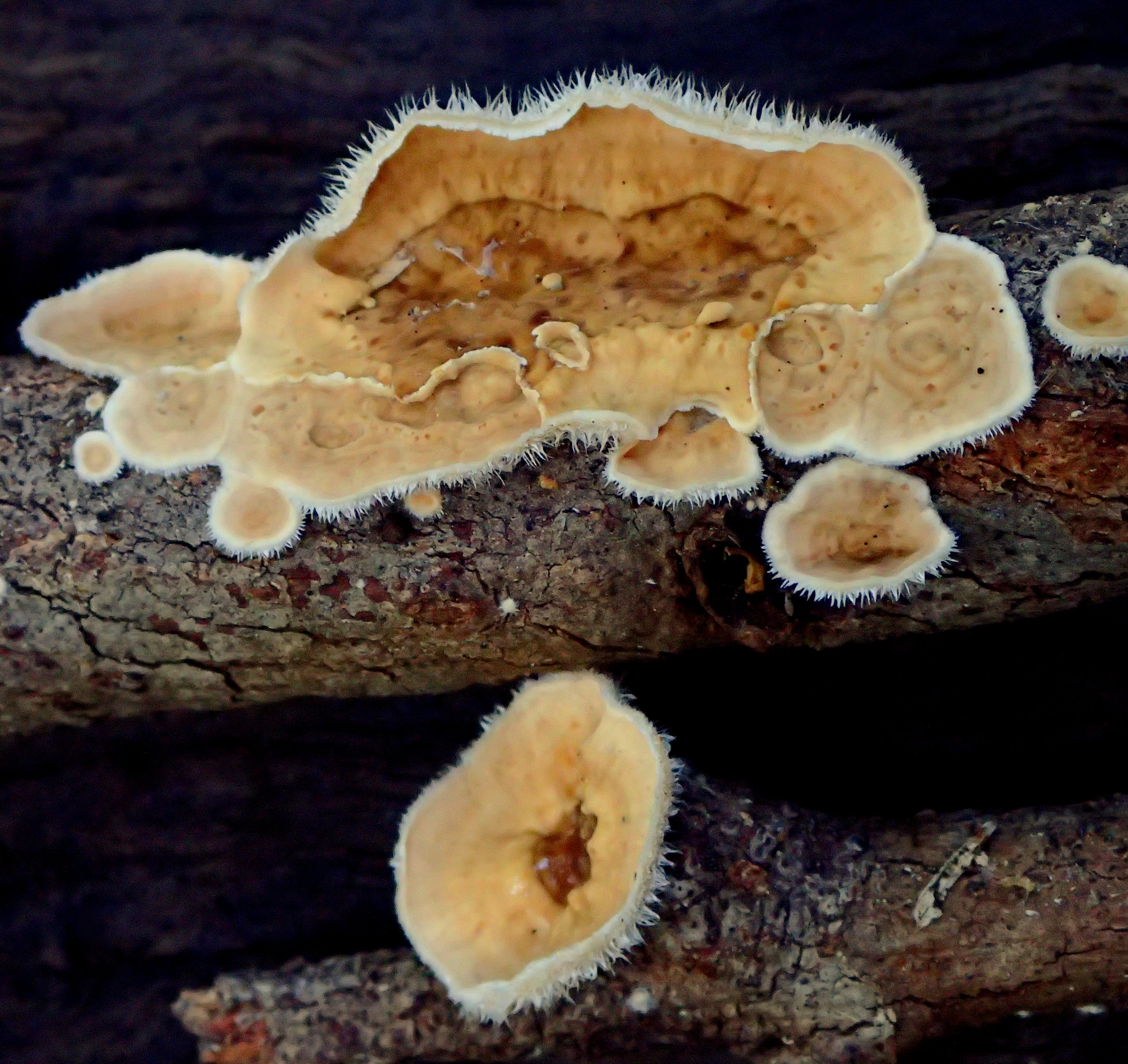

Scientific classification
- Kingdom: Fungi
- Division: Basidiomycota
- Class: Agaricomycetes
- Order: Russulales
- Family: Stereaceae
- Genus: Stereum
- Species: S. ochraceoflavum

Binomial name
- Stereum ochraceoflavum (Schwein.) Sacc. (1888)

Synonyms
- Stereum ochraceo-flavum (Schwein.) Ellis; Stereum rhicnopilum (Lév.) Sacc., 1888; Stereum striatum subsp. ochraceoflavum (Schwein.) A.L.Welden, 1971; Thelephora ochraceoflava Schwein.; Thelephora rhicnopila Lév., 1846

= Stereum ochraceoflavum =

Species of fungus

Stereum ochraceoflavum is a species of fungi having thin, tough fruiting bodies with very simple spore producing surfaces.

This species is a dull orange to tan underside with a hairy cap with long, white hairs pointing toward margin. It grows in groups on dead sticks or branches of hardwood species.
