= Seticyphella =

Scientific classification
- Kingdom: Fungi
- Division: Basidiomycota
- Class: Agaricomycetes
- Order: Agaricales
- Family: Cyphellaceae
- Genus: Seticyphella; Agerer (1983)

Type species
- Seticyphella tenuispora Agerer (1983)

Species
- S. niveola S. punctoidea S. tenuispora

Genus of fungi

Seticyphella is a genus of fungi in the Cyphellaceae family. The genus contains three species found in Europe.
