= Incrustocalyptella =

Scientific classification
- Kingdom: Fungi
- Division: Basidiomycota
- Class: Agaricomycetes
- Order: Agaricales
- Family: Cyphellaceae
- Genus: Incrustocalyptella; Agerer (1983)

Type species
- Incrustocalyptella columbiana Agerer (1983)

Species
- I. columbiana I. hapuuae I. orientalis

Genus of fungi

Incrustocalyptella is a genus of fungi in the Cyphellaceae family. The genus contains three species collectively distributed in Colombia, Papua New Guinea, the Hawaiian Islands, and Thailand.
