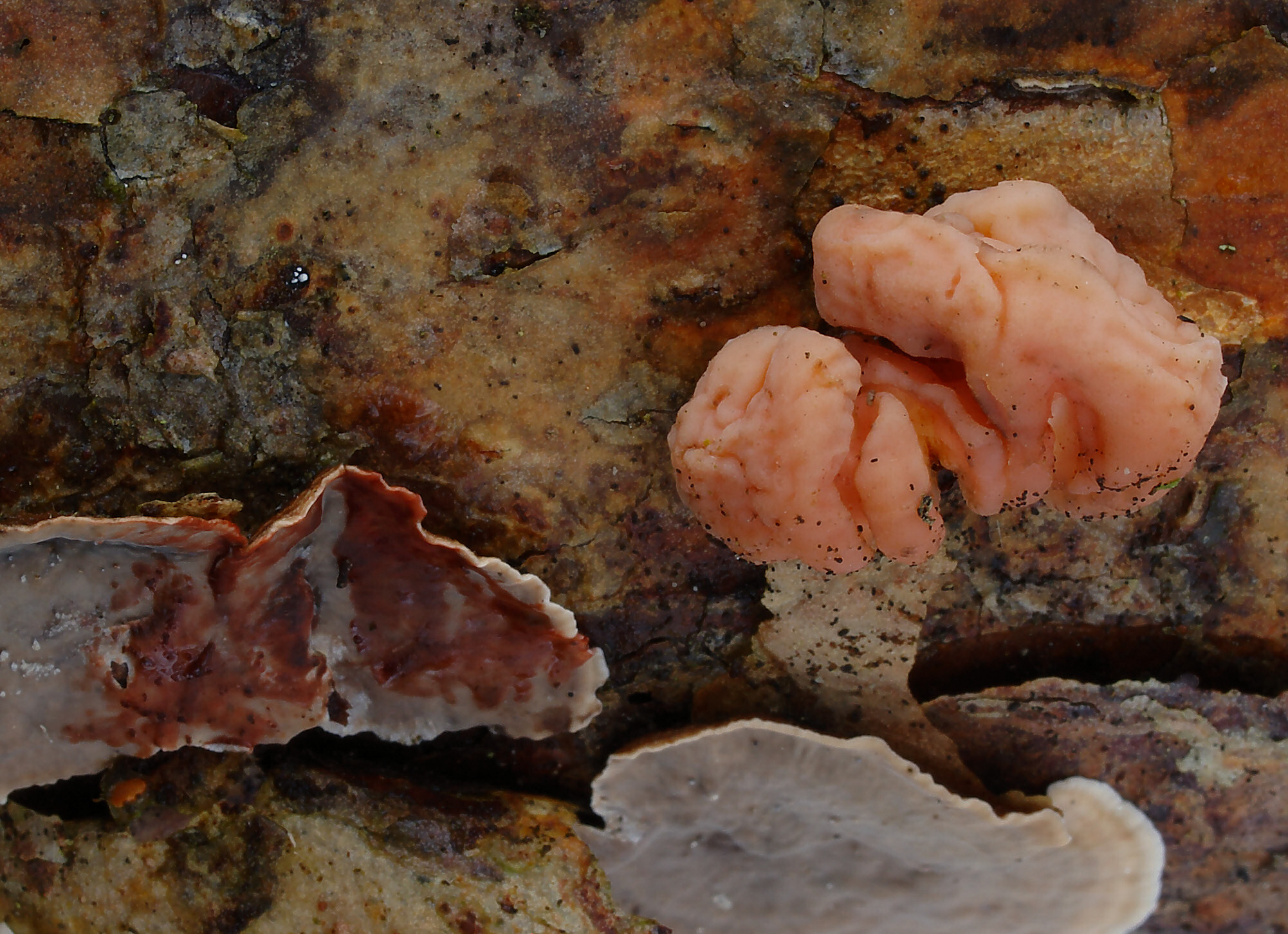
- Naematelia encephala and its host, Stereum sanguinolentum

Scientific classification
- Domain: Eukaryota
- Kingdom: Fungi
- Division: Basidiomycota
- Class: Tremellomycetes
- Order: Tremellales
- Family: Naemateliaceae
- Genus: Naematelia
- Species: N. encephala

Binomial name
- Naematelia encephala (Pers.) Fr. (1818)

Synonyms
- Tremella encephaliformis Willd. (1785); Tremella encephala (Pers.) (1801)

= Naematelia encephala =

Species of fungus

Naematelia encephala (synonym Tremella encephala) is a species of fungus producing pink, brain-like, gelatinous basidiocarps (fruit bodies). It is widespread in north temperate regions and is parasitic on another species of fungus (Stereum sanguinolentum) that grows on dead attached and recently fallen branches of conifers. In the UK, its recommended English name is conifer brain.

== Taxonomy ==
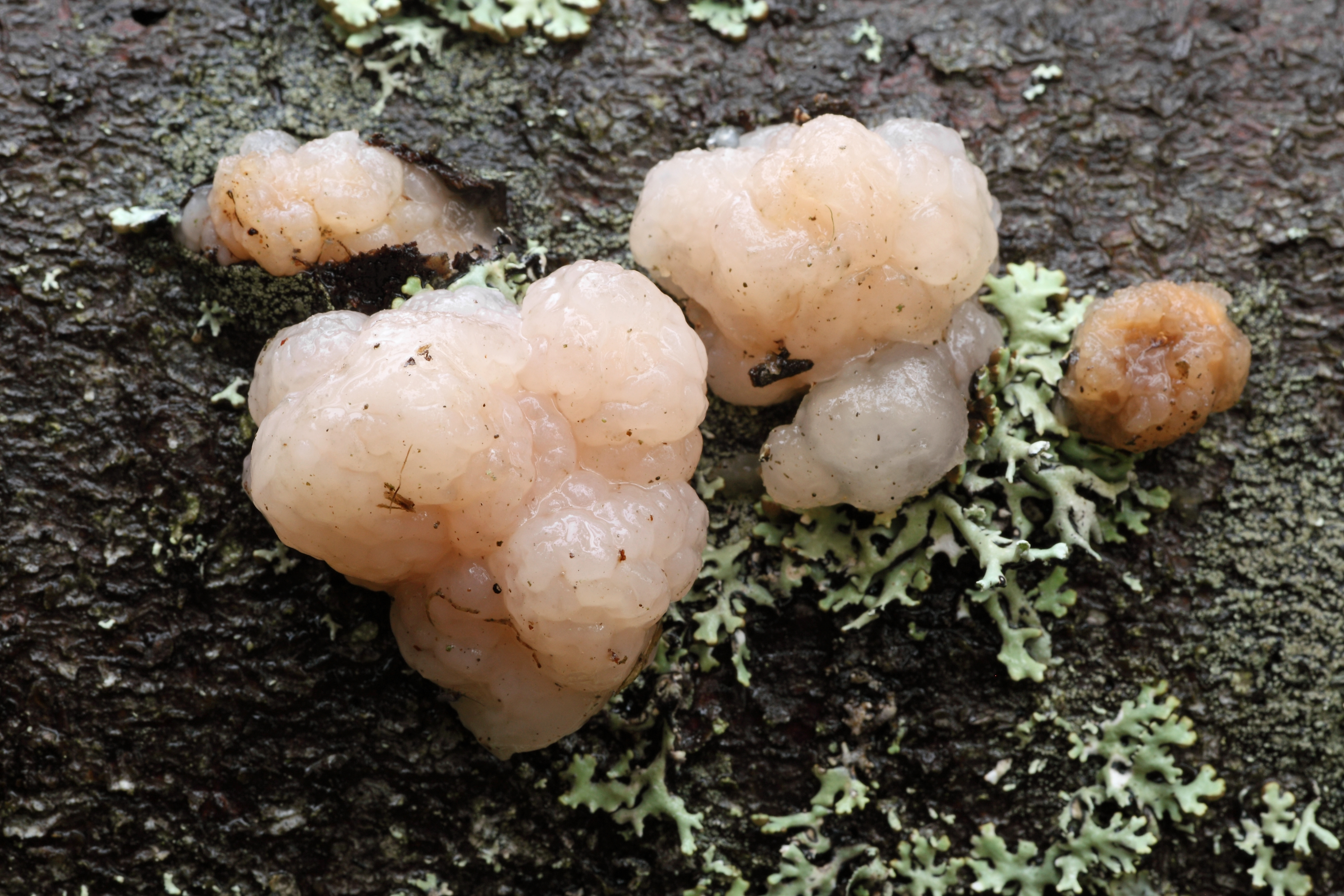
Naematelia encephala in Albu Parish, Estonia

Tremella encephala was first published in 1801 by Dutch mycologist Christiaan Hendrik Persoon, based on an earlier description by Carl Ludwig Willdenow who had described the species from Germany as Tremella encephaliformis. In 1818, it was selected by Elias Magnus Fries as the type species of Naematelia, a new genus proposed by Fries to accommodate fungi having gelatinous basidiocarps with a hard or compact core. It was not until 1961 that this central core was shown by American mycologist Robert Bandoni to be the remains of the host fungus, Stereum sanguinolentum.

The epithet encephala means "brain", with reference to the shape and colour of the basidiocarps.

== Description ==
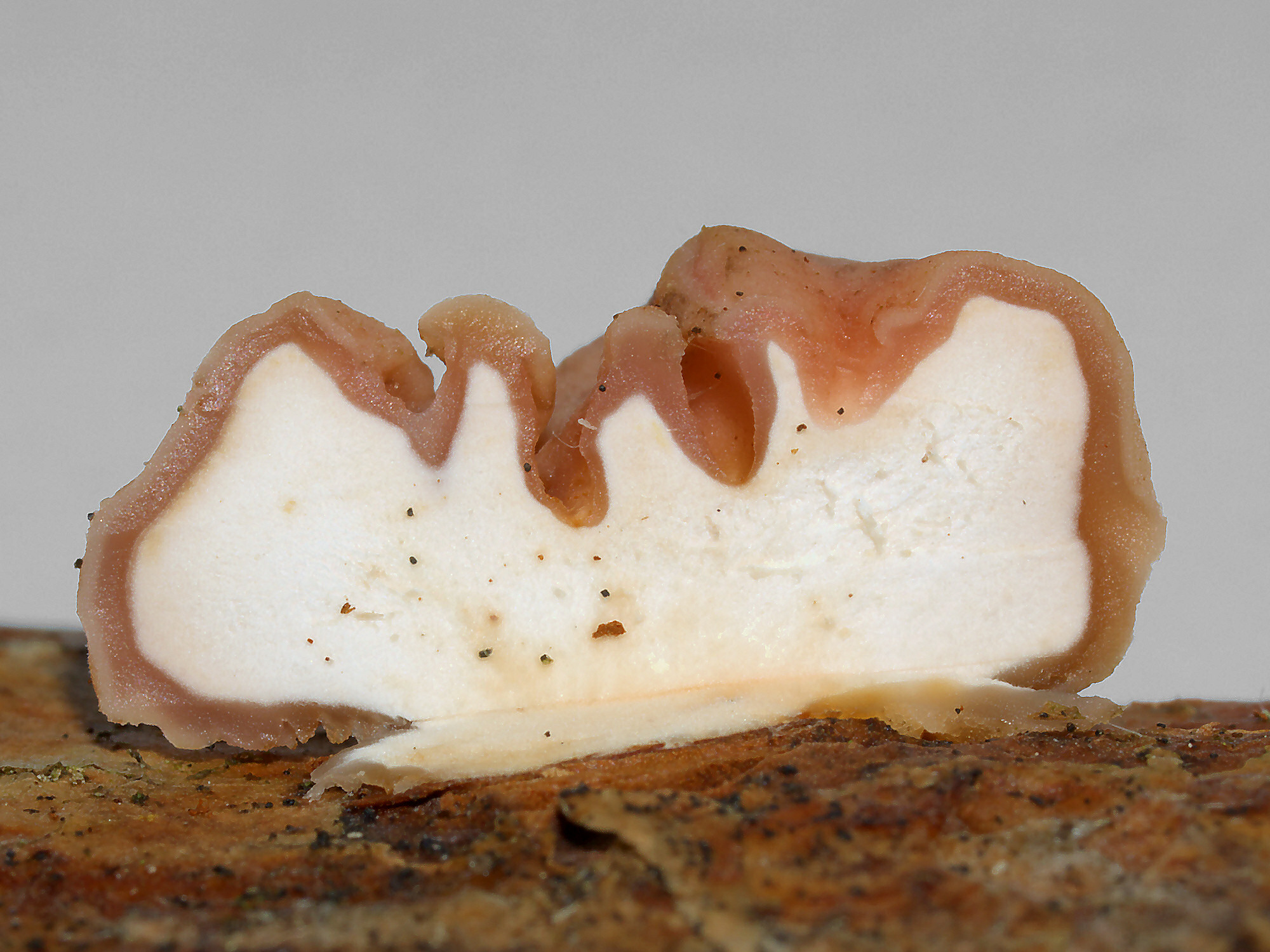
Sectioned basidiocarp showing compact core

Fruit bodies are gelatinous, dull pale pink to yellowish pink, up to 3 cm (1 in) across, and brain-like (compact and densely folded) with a hard, whitish core when cut. Microscopically, the hyphae are clamped and occur within a dense gelatinous matrix. Haustorial cells arise on the hyphae, producing filaments that attach to and penetrate the unclamped hyphae of the host (abundant in the central core). The basidia are tremelloid (spherical to ellipsoid, with oblique to vertical septa), 13–20 by 12–17 μm, usually unstalked. The basidiospores are mostly subglobose, smooth, 6–11 by 5.5–9 μm, and germinate by hyphal tube or by yeast cells.

== Habitat and distribution ==
Naematelia encephala is a parasite of Stereum sanguinolentum, growing on and often completely enveloping host basidiocarps. Following its host, fruit bodies are typically found on dead, attached or recently fallen branches of conifers.

The species has a north temperate distribution and is known throughout North America, and Northern Eurasia. It has also been recorded from Australia.
