= Cunninghammyces =

Scientific classification
- Kingdom: Fungi
- Division: Basidiomycota
- Class: Agaricomycetes
- Order: Agaricales
- Family: Cyphellaceae
- Genus: Cunninghammyces; Stalpers (1985)

Type species
- Cunninghammyces umbonatus (G.Cunn.) Stalpers (1985)

Species
- C. fusisporus C. umbonatus

Genus of fungi

Cunninghammyces is a genus of corticioid fungi in the family Cyphellaceae. The genus, described by Joost Stalpers in 1985, contains two species known from New Zealand and Réunion.

The genus name of Cunninghammyces is in honour of Gordon Herriot Cunningham (1892–1962), who was the first New Zealand-based mycologist and plant pathologist.

The genus was circumscribed by Joost A. Stalpers in New Zealand J. Bot. Vol.23 on pages 301-309 in 1985.

== See also ==
- List of Agaricales genera
