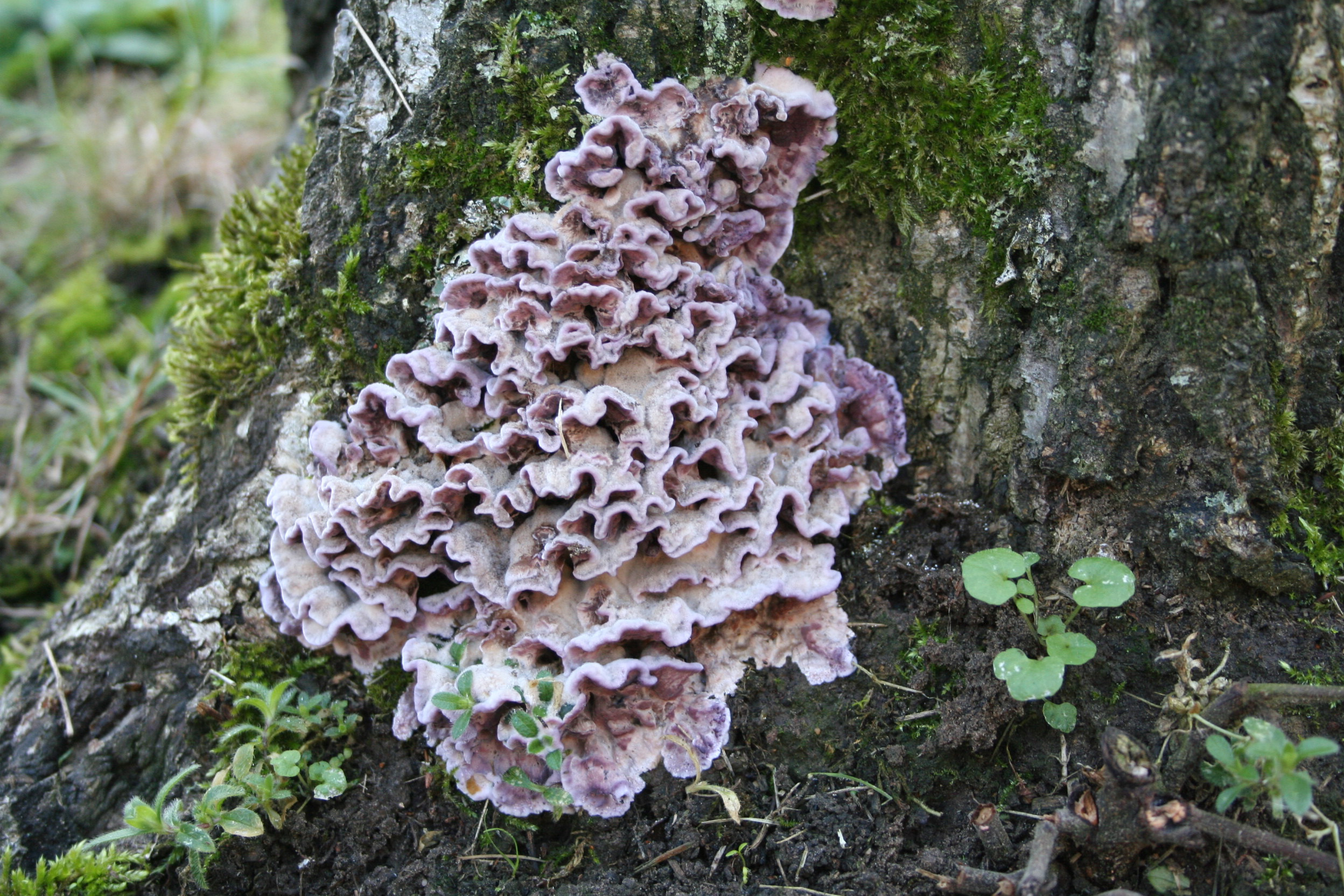
- Chondrostereum purpureum

Scientific classification
- Kingdom: Fungi
- Division: Basidiomycota
- Class: Agaricomycetes
- Order: Agaricales
- Family: Cyphellaceae
- Genus: Chondrostereum; Pouzar (1959)

Type species
- Chondrostereum purpureum (Pers.) Pouzar (1959)

Species
- C. coprosmae C. himalaicum C. purpureum C. vesiculosum

= Chondrostereum =

Genus of fungi

Chondrostereum is a genus of fungi in the family Cyphellaceae. The type species, Chondrostereum purpureum, causes the disease called silver leaf.

== Species ==
- Chondrostereum coprosmae (G.Cunn.) Stalpers (1985)
- Chondrostereum himalaicum (K.S.Thind & S.S.Rattan) S.S. Rattan (1977)
- Chondrostereum purpureum (Pers.) Pouzar (1959)
- Chondrostereum vesiculosum (G.Cunn.) Stalpers & P.K.Buchanan (1991)
