= Thujacorticium =

Scientific classification
- Kingdom: Fungi
- Division: Basidiomycota
- Class: Agaricomycetes
- Order: Agaricales
- Family: Cyphellaceae
- Genus: Thujacorticium; Ginns (1988)

Type species
- Thujacorticium mirabile Ginns (1988)

Species
- T. mirabile T. zurhausenii

Genus of fungi

Thujacorticium is a genus of corticioid fungi in the Cyphellaceae family. The genus, circumscribed by J. Ginns in 1988, contains two species.
