= Hyphoradulum =

Scientific classification
- Kingdom: Fungi
- Division: Basidiomycota
- Class: Agaricomycetes
- Order: Agaricales
- Family: Cyphellaceae
- Genus: Hyphoradulum; Pouzar (1987)

Type species
- Hyphoradulum conspicuum Pouzar (1987)

Genus of fungi

Hyphoradulum is a genus of fungi in the Cyphellaceae family. The genus is monotypic, containing the single species Hyphoradulum conspicuum, found in Europe.
