= Naematelia sinensis =

Scientific classification
- Kingdom: Fungi
- Division: Basidiomycota
- Class: Tremellomycetes
- Order: Tremellales
- Family: Naemateliaceae
- Genus: Naematelia
- Species: N. sinensis

Binomial name
- Naematelia sinensis Zhu L. Yang & J.Y. Tang (2024)

Species of fungus

Naematelia sinensis is a species of gelatinous fungus in the family Naemateliaceae, order Tremellales. It is indigenous to China, where it is known as the "Jin'er mushroom" and has economic and medicinal importance. The species is an obligate parasite, requiring the presence of the fungus Stereum hirsutum or related species for the formation of its fruiting bodies.

== Taxonomy ==
Naematelia sinensis was formally described in 2024 as part of a taxonomic revision of the Naematelia aurantialba species complex in southwestern China. Molecular phylogenetic analyses demonstrated that specimens previously identified as N. aurantialba in China represent multiple distinct species, including N. sinensis.

== Description and ecology ==
The basidiomata of N. sinensis are gelatinous, yellow to orange-yellow, and typically globose to hemispherical with a wrinkled or contorted surface. The species occurs in subtropical broad-leaved forests at elevations of approximately 1800–2600 m and grows on dead wood.

Like other members of the genus, N. sinensis is mycoparasitic. It parasitizes species of Stereum, particularly Stereum hirsutum, forming specialized structures that penetrate host hyphae. This obligate parasitic relationship makes it a useful model for studying fungal–fungal interactions.

The species is commercially cultivated in parts of China and is valued as an edible fungus with medicinal importance.

== Genomics ==
Chromosome-level genome assemblies representing the four mating types of Naematelia sinensis were published in 2026, providing the first reference genomes for the species. The genomes are approximately 20.8 Mb in size and each comprises 12 chromosomes. The assemblies have BUSCO completeness of 96.8–97.1% and contain 6,558–6,578 predicted protein-coding genes.
