= Catilla =

Scientific classification
- Kingdom: Fungi
- Division: Basidiomycota
- Class: Agaricomycetes
- Order: Agaricales
- Family: Cyphellaceae
- Genus: Catilla

Genus of fungi

Catilla is a genus of fungus in the family Cyphellaceae.
