= Granulobasidium =

Scientific classification
- Domain: Eukaryota
- Kingdom: Fungi
- Division: Basidiomycota
- Class: Agaricomycetes
- Order: Agaricales
- Family: Cyphellaceae
- Genus: Granulobasidium; Jülich

Type species
- Granulobasidium vellereum (Ellis & Cragin) Jülich

Species
- Species include: Granulobasidium vellereum

Genus of fungi

Granulobasidium is a genus of fungi in the family Cyphellaceae.
