= Phaeoporotheleum =

Scientific classification
- Kingdom: Fungi
- Division: Basidiomycota
- Class: Agaricomycetes
- Order: Agaricales
- Family: Cyphellaceae
- Genus: Phaeoporotheleum (W.B.Cooke) W.B.Cooke (1961)

Type species
- Phaeoporotheleum revivescens (Berk. & M.A.Curtis) W.B.Cooke (1961)

Species
- P. bombycinum P. revivescens

Genus of fungi

Phaeoporotheleum is a genus of fungi in the Cyphellaceae family. The genus contains two species collectively distributed in Cuba and Argentina.
