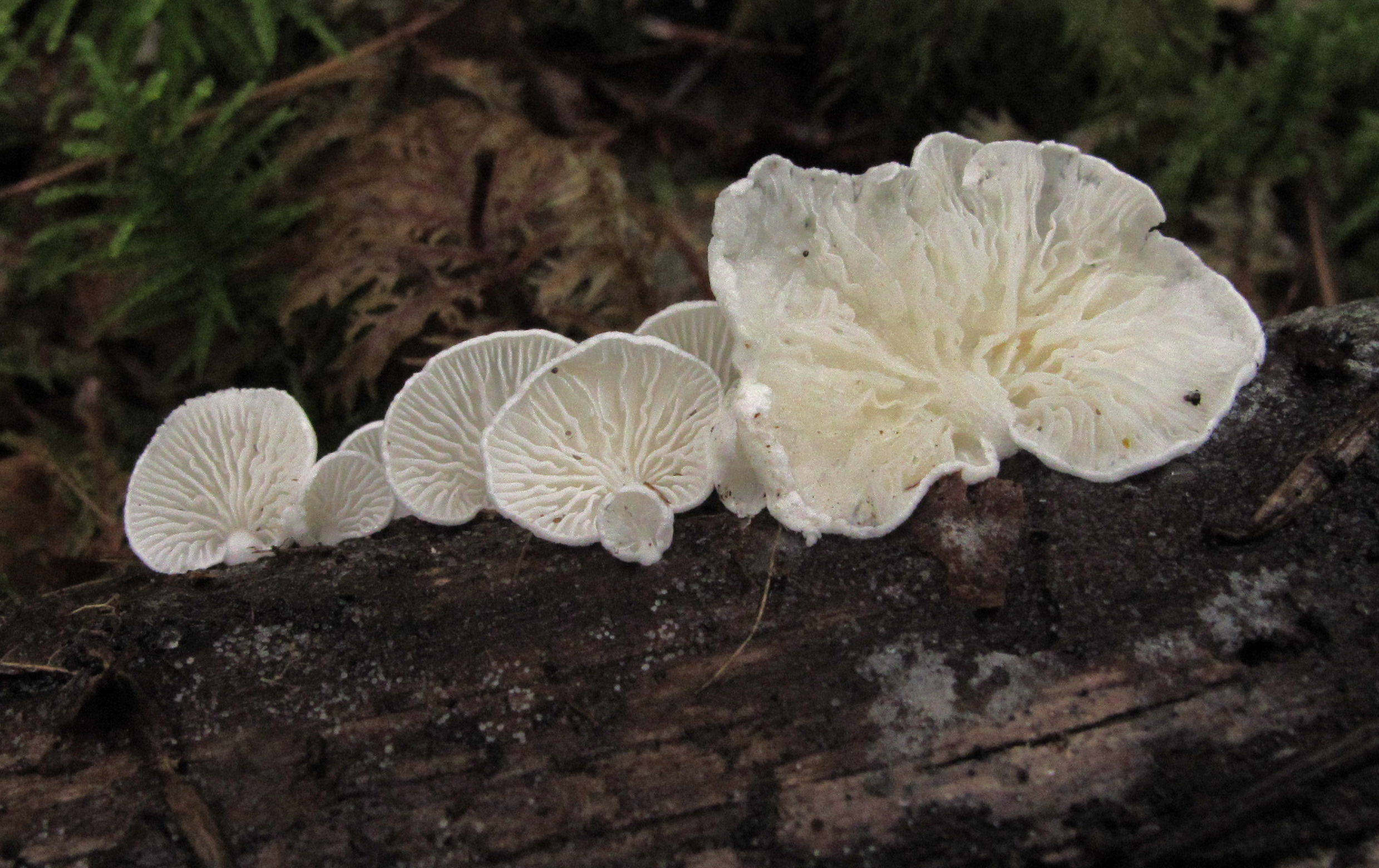
- Cheimonophyllum candidissimum

Scientific classification
- Kingdom: Fungi
- Division: Basidiomycota
- Class: Agaricomycetes
- Order: Agaricales
- Family: Cyphellaceae
- Genus: Cheimonophyllum; Singer (1955)

Type species
- Cheimonophyllum candidissimum (Berk. & M.A.Curtis) Singer (1955)

Species
- C. candidissimum C. roseum C. stypticoides

= Cheimonophyllum =

Genus of fungi

Cheimonophyllum is a genus of fungi in the family Cyphellaceae. The widely distributed genus contains three species.
