= Asterocyphella =

Scientific classification
- Kingdom: Fungi
- Division: Basidiomycota
- Class: Agaricomycetes
- Order: Agaricales
- Family: Cyphellaceae
- Genus: Asterocyphella; W.B.Cooke (1961)

Type species
- Asterocyphella floccosa W.B.Cooke (1961)

Species
- A. floccosa A. friesii A. theiacantha

Genus of fungi

Asterocyphella is a genus of fungi in the Cyphellaceae family. The widespread genus contains three species.
