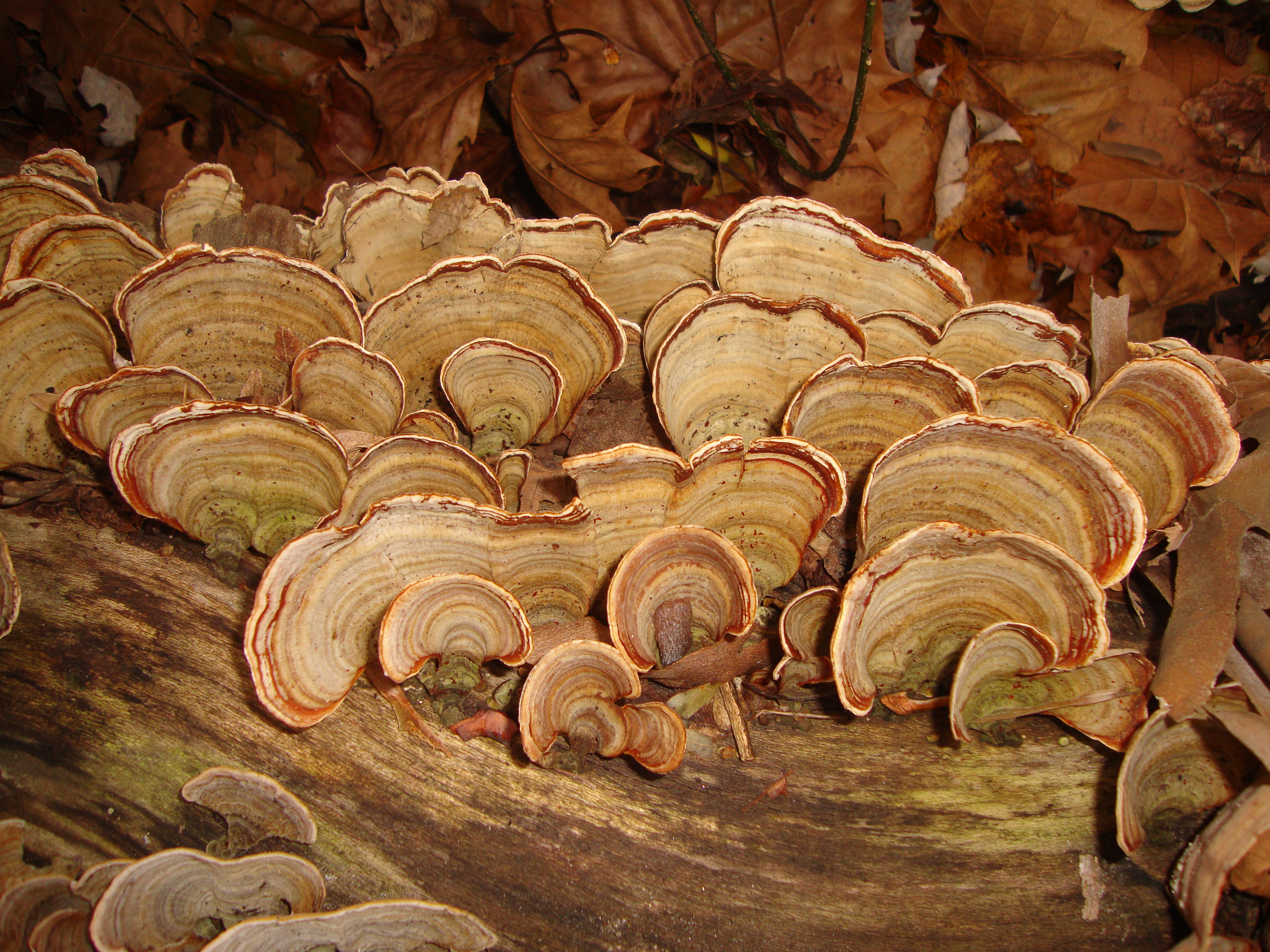

Scientific classification
- Kingdom: Fungi
- Division: Basidiomycota
- Class: Agaricomycetes
- Order: Russulales
- Family: Stereaceae
- Genus: Stereum
- Species: S. ostrea

Binomial name
- Stereum ostrea (Blume & T. Nees ex Fr. 1838)

Synonyms
- Stereum fasciatum; S. lobatum; S. versicolor; Thelephora ostrea

= Stereum ostrea =

Species of fungus

Stereum ostrea
- Mycological characteristics
- Smooth hymenium
- Cap is offset or indistinct
- Hymenium is decurrent
- Lacks a stipe
- Spore print is white to yellow
- Ecology is saprotrophic or parasitic
- Edibility is inedible

Stereum ostrea, also called false turkey-tail and golden curtain crust, is a basidiomycete fungus in the genus Stereum. It is a plant pathogen and a wood decay fungus. The name ostrea, from the word 'oyster', describes its shape. With concentric circles of many colors, it highly resembles Trametes versicolor, turkey-tail, and is thus called the 'false turkey-tail'. The stemless fruiting body is shell-like and grows 1–7 cm (0.39–2.76 in) high. It is tough and inedible. It grows on tree bark. This fungus is native to the island of Java, Indonesia and has been misapplied to the North American Stereum species Stereum fasciatum, Stereum lobatum, and Stereum subtomentosum.

== Description ==
It gets its name 'false turkey-tail' because it mimics Trametes versicolor. They can be distinguished as T. versicolor has numerous pores on the underside of its fruiting body, unlike S. ostrea. Also, S. ostrea is more red in color. Factors such as its relatively large size and shell-like (not flat) body distinguish it from other members of the genus Stereum.

The fruiting body is 1–7 cm (0.39–2.76 in) wide, shaped like a shell and thin. Its surface can be hairy or smooth at the very first, growing smoother with age. The concentric zones can have a variety of colors - ranging from yellowish red to a dark brown. If algae grow on it, the color can change to green. The flesh is very thin and too tough to eat, with no distinct odor. The fungus lacks a stem. The underside is smooth and lacks pores, white to gray or a reddish-brown shade in color. The spore is white, and measures 5.5–7.5 μm (0.0055–0.0075 mm) x 2–3 μm (0.0020–0.0030 mm).

It is inedible.

== Chemical properties ==
Stereum ostrea produces lignolytic enzymes, which decompose lignin. The enzyme production was compared for ten days with Phanerochaete chrysosporium, in a liquid medium. S. ostrea produced a higher number of laccase, lignin peroxidase and manganese peroxidase enzymes. the discoloration of the dye Remazol confirmed the presence of enzymes.

Methoxylaricinolic acid and laricinolic acid have been isolated from this mushroom. Sterostreins A–E (1, 2, 3a/3b, 4, and 5) have been found in S. ostrea, of which sterostrein A showed antimalarial activity and was cytotoxic.

== Habitat and distribution ==
Stereum ostrea is saprophytic in nature. It is a plant pathogen, growing on hardwood tree barks, especially oak, and decaying parts. It leaves white deposits in these places. It grows individually, but in a dense manner. Phlebia incarnata, another fungus, is most commonly found growing alongside or even intermingled with this species. This fungus can be parasitized by jelly fungi. It grows all year round and is found in Indonesia.

== Images of Stereum ostrea ==
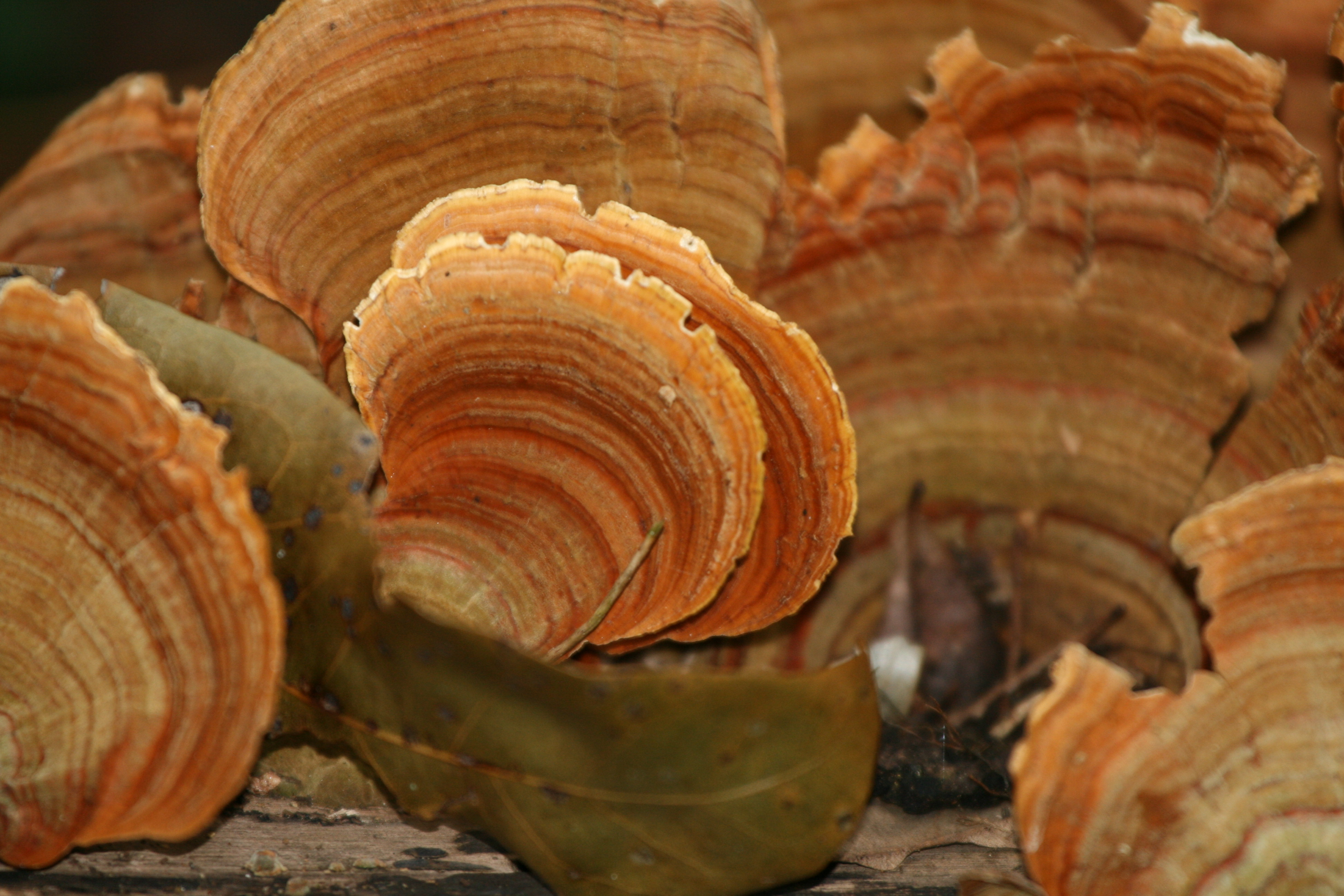
S. ostrea spread on a tree.

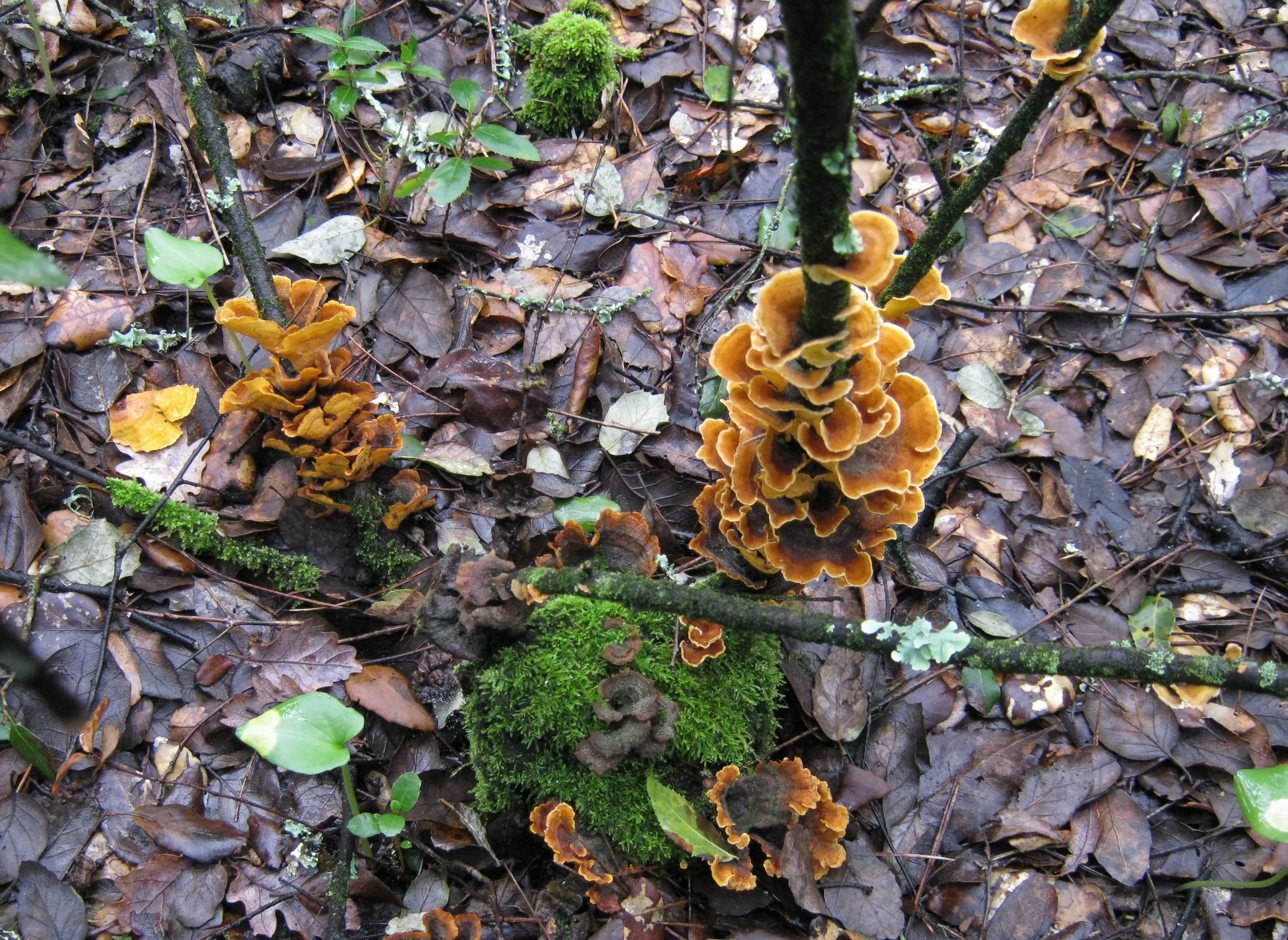
S. ostrea, a plant pathogen, grows on tree barks.
