= Gloeostereum =

Scientific classification
- Kingdom: Fungi
- Division: Basidiomycota
- Class: Agaricomycetes
- Order: Agaricales
- Family: Cyphellaceae
- Genus: Gloeostereum; S.Ito & S.Imai (1933)

Type species
- Gloeostereum incarnatum S.Ito & S.Imai (1933)

Species of fungus

Gloeostereum is a genus of fungi in the family Cyphellaceae. This is a monotypic genus, containing the single species Gloeostereum incarnatum, an edible mushroom native to China. In Chinese culture, it is called yú'ěr (榆 耳; literally "elm ear"). It is sometimes included in a vegetarian dish called Buddha's delight.

== See also ==
- List of Agaricales genera
