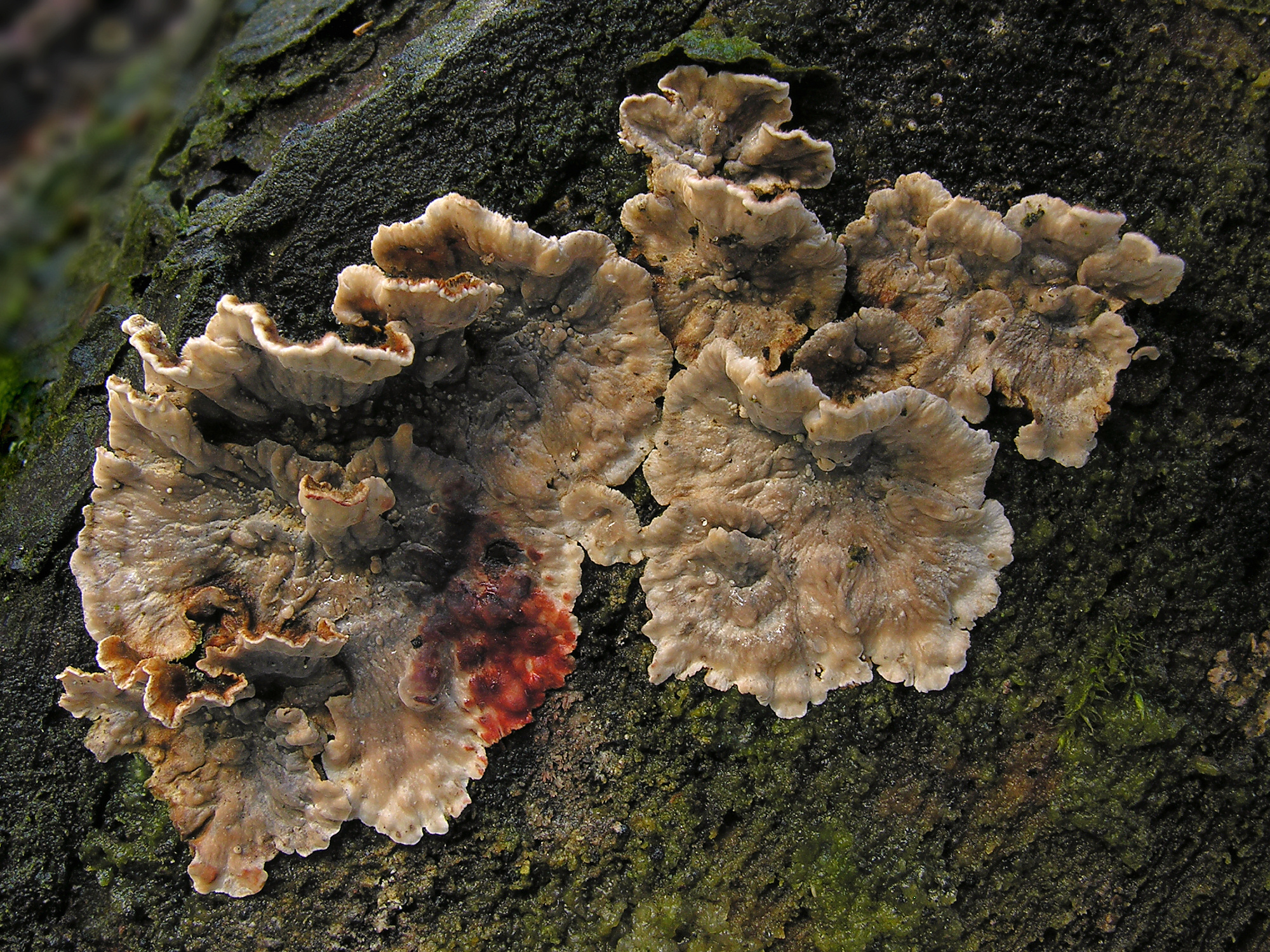

Scientific classification
- Kingdom: Fungi
- Division: Basidiomycota
- Class: Agaricomycetes
- Order: Russulales
- Family: Stereaceae
- Genus: Stereum
- Species: S. sanguinolentum

Binomial name
- Stereum sanguinolentum (Alb. & Schwein.) Fr. (1838)

Synonyms
- Thelephora sanguinolenta Alb. & Schwein. (1805); Phlebomorpha sanguinolenta (Alb. & Schwein.) Pers. (1822); Thelephora sericea var. sanguinolenta (Alb. & Schwein.) Pers. (1822); Auricularia sanguinolenta (Alb. & Schwein.) Grev. (1826); Merulius sanguinolentus (Alb. & Schwein.) Spreng. (1827); Stereum balsameum Peck (1875); Haematostereum sanguinolentum (Alb. & Schwein.) Pouzar (1959)

= Stereum sanguinolentum =

Species of fungus

Stereum sanguinolentum is a species of fungus in the Stereaceae family. A plant pathogen, it causes red heart rot, a red discoloration on conifers, particularly spruces and Douglas-firs. Fruit bodies, which are produced either on dead wood or on dead branches of living trees, form a thin leathery crust on the wood surface. Fresh fruit bodies will bleed a red-colored liquid if injured, reflected in the common names bleeding Stereum or the bleeding conifer parchment. It can be the host of the parasitic jelly fungus Naematelia encephala (synonym Tremella encephala)

== Taxonomy ==
The species was first described scientifically by Albertini and Schweinitz in 1805 as Thelephora sanguinolenta. Other genera to which it has been transferred throughout its taxonomical history include Phlebomorpha, Auricularia, Merulius, and Haematostereum. The fungus is commonly known as the "bleeding Stereum" or the "bleeding conifer parchment".

== Description ==
The fruit body of Stereum sanguinolentum manifests itself as a thin (typically less than 1 mm thick) leathery crust on the surface of the host wood. Often, the upper edge is curled to form a narrow shelf (usually less than 10 mm thick). When present, these shelves can be fused to or overlap neighboring shelves. The surface of the fruit body consists of a layer of fine felt-like hairs, sometimes pressed flat against the surface. The color ranges from beige to buff to dark brown in mature specimens; the margins are lighter-colored. Fresh fruit bodies that are injured exude a red liquid, or will bruise a red color if touched. The fruit bodies dry to a greyish-brown color. The spores are ellipsoid to cylindrical, amyloid, and typically measure 7–10 by 3–4.5 μm.

Stereum sanguinolentum can be parasitized by the jelly fungus Naematelia encephala (synonym Tremella encephala).

== Symptoms ==
Stereum sanguinolentum is a basidiomycete that causes both brown rot and white rot on conifers. The primary symptom is the red streaking discoloration. It is a white-rot basidiomycete that causes an extensive decay resulting from wounds, logging extractions, bark peeking, or branch pruning. Stereum sanguinolentum forms territorial clones while spreading by vegetative growth between spatially separated resource units; Armillaria spp, Heterobasidion annosum, Phellinus weirii, Inonotus tomentosus, and Phellinus noxius all work with Stereum sanguinolentum to attack the host. These pathogens combine to form territorial clones that can cover up to several hectares and survive for hundreds of years while infecting trees.

White rot causes a gradual decrease in cellulose as the decay continues to affect the tree. The white rot fungi consume the segments of cellulose that are released during the decay as quickly as they are produced. In white rot, which is also known as “wound rot of spruce”, the spores create open wounds on the host.

In brown rot, the cellulose is degraded. The rapid decrease in cellulose chain length implies that the catalyst that facilitates the depolymerization readily gains access to cellulose chains.

== Life cycle ==
Stereum sanguinolentum is an amphithallic basidiomycete. Monospore intrabasidiome pairings are always compatible when reproducing, making it easy for the fungus to spread. The monobasidiospore and trama isolates are plurinucleate and bear clamp connections, and are often dikaryotic. Basidiospores are heterokikaryotic indicating that they are amphithallic. The mycelia that spreads the fungi grow from the heterodikaryotic spores that originate from the basidiospores. Either mating between homokaryons originating from the monokaryotic basidiospores, or by the parasexual process, results in recombination.

Stereum sanguinolentum is an extremely fast colonizer of newly dead or wounded conifer sapwood. Being amphithallic allows this cycle to have selective advantages upon such organisms by enhancing survival and dispersal.

Stereum sanguinolentum
- Mycological characteristics
- Smooth hymenium
- No distinct cap
- Hymenium attachment is irregular or not applicable
- Lacks a stipe
- Ecology is saprotrophic or parasitic
- Edibility is unknown

Dispersal occurs by basidiospores only and the most common dispersal mechanism is wind. The wind-blown basidiospores are produced parthenogenically (i.e., reproduction from an ovum without fertilization). In white rot, the infection occurs from spores landing near the wounds or the transmission of mycelial fragments by wood sap. The rot extension spreads extremely fast in the first few years after infection but spreads even quicker if the infected injury is at the root collar rather than at the stem.

== Habitat, distribution, and ecology ==
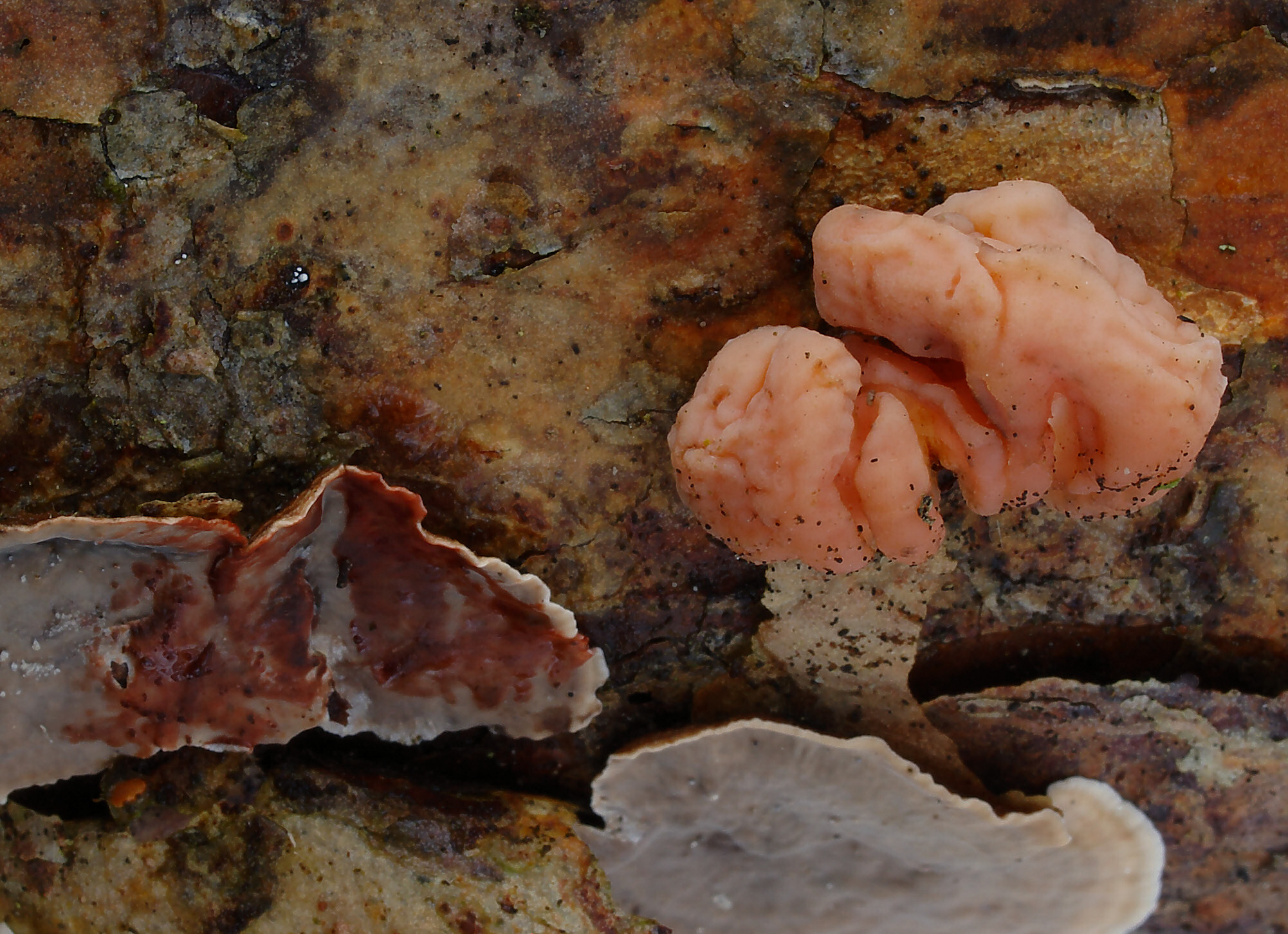
Stereum sanguinolentum can be parasitized by the fungus Tremella encephala

The fungus causes a brown heart rot, resulting in wood that is a light brown to red-brown color, and dry, with a stringy texture. A cross-section of infected wood reveals a circular infection around the center of the log. It enters plants through open wounds caused by mechanical damage or by grazing wildlife. Fragments of mycelia can be spread by wood wasps (genus Sirex). The rot spreads up to 40 cm (16 in) per year. It has also been recorded on balsam fir, Douglas fir, and western hemlock. The fungus is geographically widespread, and has been recorded from North America, Europe, east Africa, New Zealand, and Australia.

== Management ==
The halos caused by Stereum sanguinolentum can be prevented by taking care during the harvesting of trees to assure that no injuries occur. If injuries occur, the wounds can be treated with wound dressing.
