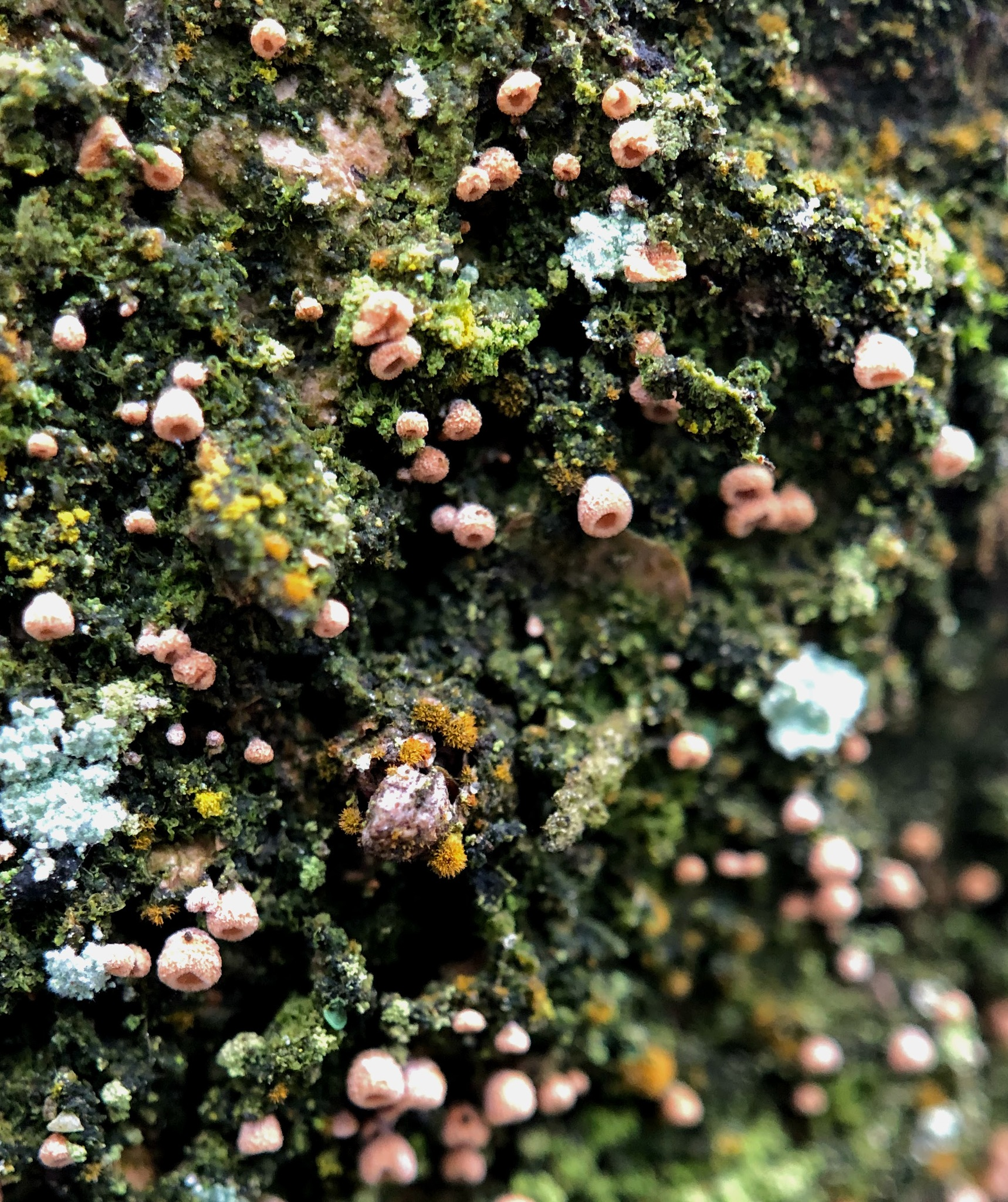
- Cyphella ferruginea

Scientific classification
- Kingdom: Fungi
- Division: Basidiomycota
- Class: Agaricomycetes
- Order: Agaricales
- Family: Cyphellaceae; Lotsy (1907)

Type genus
- Cyphella Fr.

= Cyphellaceae =

Family of fungi

The Cyphellaceae are a family of fungi in the order Agaricales. The family contains 16 genera and, in 2008, 31 species. Its sister group is the Porotheleaceae, both of which are in the 'marasmioid clade'.

== Genera ==
- Asterocyphella
- Campanophyllum
- Catilla
- Cheimonophyllum
- Chondrostereum
- Cunninghammyces
- Cyphella
- Gloeocorticium
- Gloeostereum
- Granulobasidium
- Hyphoradulum
- Incrustocalyptella
- Phaeoporotheleum
- Seticyphella
- Sphaerobasidioscypha
- Thujacorticium

== See also ==
- List of Agaricales families
