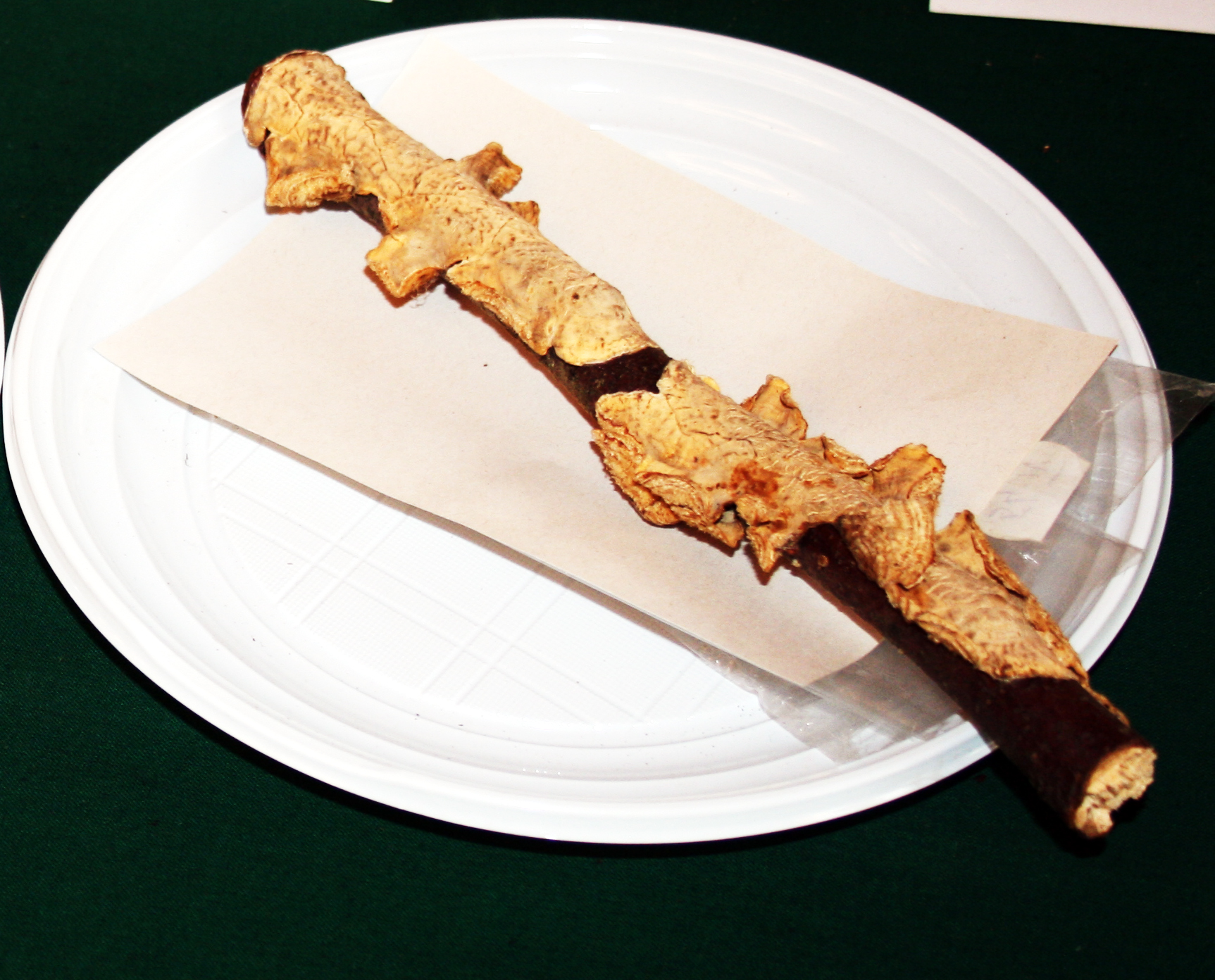

Scientific classification
- Domain: Eukaryota
- Kingdom: Fungi
- Division: Basidiomycota
- Class: Agaricomycetes
- Order: Russulales
- Family: Stereaceae
- Genus: Stereum
- Species: S. rameale

Binomial name
- Stereum rameale (Schwein.) Burt, (1920)

Synonyms
- Stereum complicatum sensu Nordic Macromycetes; Stereum hirsutum var. rameale (Schwein.) Berk., (1872); Stereum ochraceoflavum sensu Julich [Kl. Kryptog. llb/1: 208 (1984)]; Stereum sulphuratum sensu auct. brit.; Thelephora hirsuta d ramealis Pers., (1801); Thelephora ramealis Schwein., (1822)

= Stereum rameale =

Species of fungus

Stereum rameale is a plant pathogen infecting peach trees. It is often found in tiers on the dead wood of broad-leaved trees.

== Description ==
The species is thin, elastic and tough when moist, hard and brittle when dry. No distinctive odour or taste. No change in flesh colour when cut. It is inedible.
