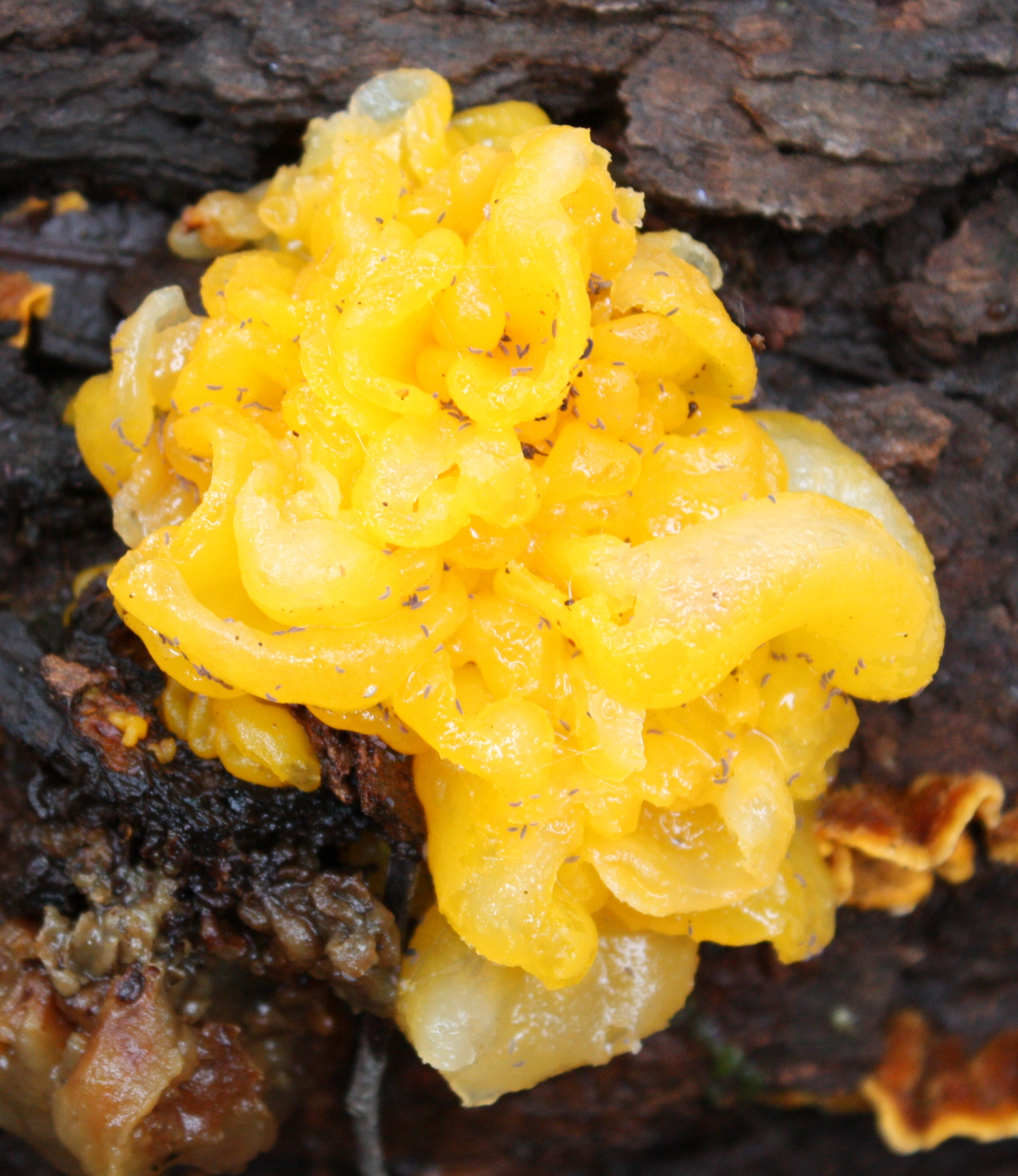
- Naematelia aurantia

Scientific classification
- Kingdom: Fungi
- Division: Basidiomycota
- Class: Tremellomycetes
- Order: Tremellales
- Family: Naemateliaceae; X.Z. Liu, F.Y. Bai, M. Groenew. & Boekhout (2015)

Genera
- Naematelia; Dimennazyma

= Naemateliaceae =

Genus of fungi

The Naemateliaceae are a family of fungi in the order Tremellales. The family currently contains two genera.
