= Stereum hirsutum =

Scientific classification
- Kingdom: Fungi
- Division: Basidiomycota
- Class: Agaricomycetes
- Order: Russulales
- Family: Stereaceae
- Genus: Stereum
- Species: S. hirsutum

Binomial name
- Stereum hirsutum (Willd.) Pers. (1800)

Synonyms
- Helvella acaulis Pers. (1778); Auricularia reflexa Bull. (1786); Thelephora hirsuta Willd. (1787); Boletus auriformis Bolton (1788); Auricularia aurantiaca Schumach. (1803); Thelephora reflexa (Bull.) Lam. & DC. (1805); Stereum hirsutum var. cristulatum Quél. (1872); Stereum reflexum (Bull.) Sacc. (1916)

Species of fungus

Stereum hirsutum
- Mycological characteristics
- Smooth hymenium
- Cap is offset or indistinct
- Hymenium is decurrent
- Lacks a stipe
- Spore print is white
- Ecology is saprotrophic or parasitic
- Edibility is inedible

Stereum hirsutum, commonly known as the false turkey tail, hairy stereum, or hairy curtain crust, is a species of fungus and a plant pathogen that infects coniferous and deciduous trees.

== Description ==
The fuzzy orangish fruiting bodies typically form in multiple overlapping brackets on dead wood. The cap is 1–5 centimetres (3/8–2 in) wide, sometimes fused to form wider shelves. The flesh is thin and tough. The spores and spore print are white.

It is inedible.

=== Similar species ===
Similar species include Stereum rameale, S. ostrea, and Trametes versicolor.

== Habitat and distribution ==
Its substrates include dead limbs and trunks of both hardwoods and conifers.

It is found in various parts of the world including North America, Europe (from the Nordic countries south to the Mediterranean sea and the British Isles) and Australia.

== Ecology ==
It is a plant pathogen infecting peach trees. S. hirsutum is itself parasitised by species such as the fungus Naematelia aurantia.

== Gallery ==
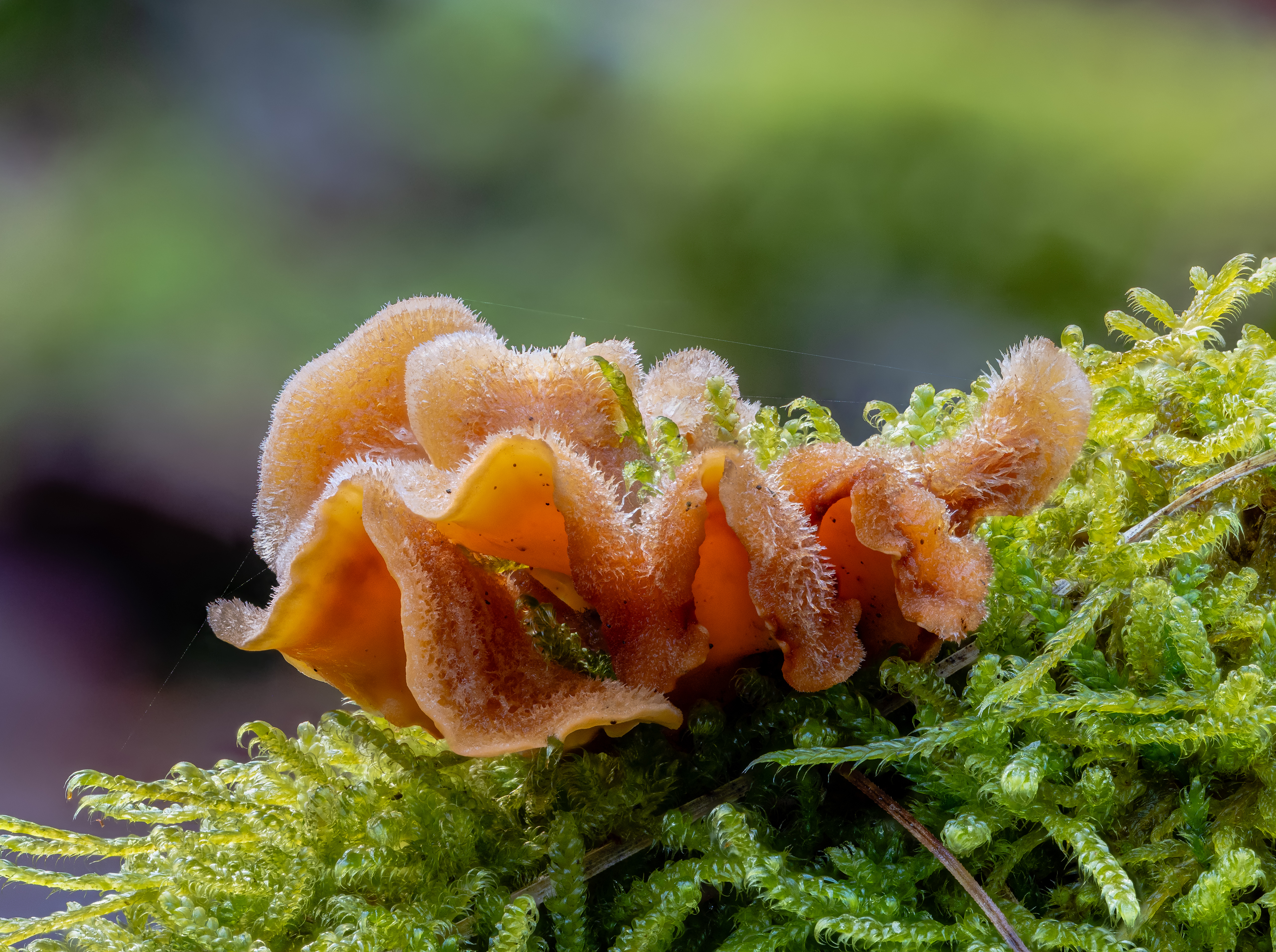
Small fruiting body
