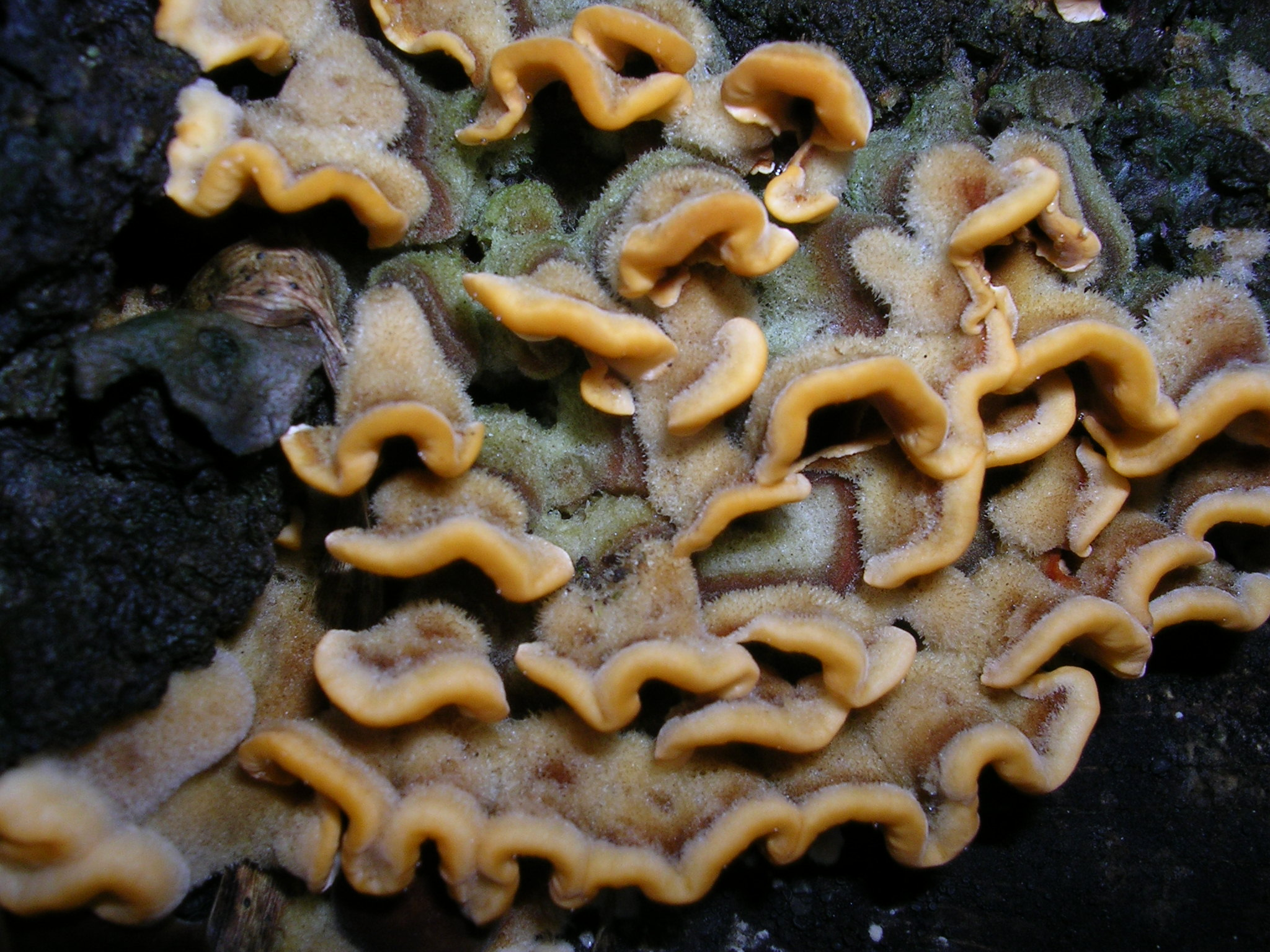
- Stereum hirsutum - false turkey tail

Scientific classification
- Kingdom: Fungi
- Division: Basidiomycota
- Class: Agaricomycetes
- Order: Russulales
- Family: Stereaceae
- Genus: Stereum; Hill ex Pers. (1794)

Type species
- Stereum hirsutum (Willd.) Pers. (1800)

Synonyms
- Haematostereum Pouzar (1959)

= Stereum =

Genus of fungi

Stereum is the type genus of the Stereaceae family of fungi, in the Russulales order. Common names for species of this genus include leaf fungus, wax fungus, and shelf fungus. Fungi having a shape similar to a Stereum are said to have a stereoid shape. Stereum contains 27 species that have a widespread distribution.

== Description ==
Stereum species are wood decay fungi. Their simple, shelving fruiting bodies have a smooth hymenium, lacking gills or tubes. Like most members or the family Stereaceae, Stereum fruiting bodies lack clamp connections and produce amyloid basidiospores.

== Ecology ==
Stereum species are found to live on all kinds of deadwood or hardwood or dead leaves (they are therefore said to be saprobic). Sometimes they are also found on living leaves.

Fungi of this genus have been recorded as occasional food of the pleasing fungus beetle Dacne quadrimaculata.

== Taxonomy ==
It is the type genus of the Stereaceae family. Until recently, the genus was classified in the Corticiaceae family, of the Corticiales order. However, it was given its own family as a result of the split-up of the Corticiales.

The species can be divided into two groups: the bleeders (those that exude a red liquid from cut surfaces, similarly to Lactarius species) and the non-bleeders (those that do not). In 1959, Zdenek Pouzar created a distinct genus, Haematostereum, for the bleeding species of Stereum, including H. gausapatum, H. rugosum, and H. sanguinolentum. Modern authors do not consider Haematostereum to be a distinct genus, so it is currently treated as a synonym of Stereum.

=== Species ===
There are numerous species in this genus, the most common one being Stereum hirsutum. The following species are recognised in the genus Stereum:

- Stereum acanthophysatum Rehill & B.K. Bakshi (1966)
- Stereum adnatum Lloyd (1925)
- Stereum albostipitatum Lloyd (1913)
- Stereum alternum Lloyd (1924)
- Stereum aotearoa G. Cunn. (1956)
- Stereum aratum Pat. (1907)
- Stereum armeniacum Boidin & Gilles (1989)
- Stereum auriscalpium Lloyd (1920)
- Stereum aurora Killerm. (1943)
- Stereum avellanaceum Lloyd (1936)
- Stereum azonum Velen. (1922)
- Stereum beigehymenium Teixeira (1945)
- Stereum bellum (Kunze) Sacc. (1888)
- Stereum bertolonii Sacc. (1895)
- Stereum bombycinum Lloyd (1925)
- Stereum boninense Yasuda (1919)
- Stereum braunii (Henn.) Beeli (1926)
- Stereum campaniforme Pat. (1908)
- Stereum carthusianum E.H.L. Krause (1928)
- Stereum cinericium Lloyd (1922)
- Stereum coalescens Lloyd (1925)
- Stereum complicatum (Fr.) Fr. (1838)
- Stereum conchoides Lloyd (1925)
- Stereum conicum Burt (1920)
- Stereum consobrinum (P. Karst.) Sacc. & Trotter (1912)
- Stereum contrastum Lloyd (1924)
- Stereum corruge Lloyd (1919)
- Stereum crispulum Lloyd (1936)
- Stereum cupulatum Pat. (1903)
- Stereum dimiticum Rehill & B.K. Bakshi (1966)
- Stereum durbanense Van der Byl (1922)
- Stereum durum Lloyd (1919)
- Stereum earlei Burt (1920)
- Stereum ellipticum Ryvarden (2020)
- Stereum elongatum Lloyd (1923)
- Stereum fechtneri Velen. (1922)
- Stereum fomitopsis Lloyd (1924)
- Stereum fragile Pat. (1900)
- Stereum gausapatum (Fr.) Fr. (1874)
- Stereum greslebiniae Gorjón & Hallenb. (2012)
- Stereum hirsutum (Willd.) Pers. (1800)
- Stereum humillimum Rick (1959)
- Stereum hymenoglium Speg. (1921)
- Stereum japonicum Yasuda (1923)
- Stereum javanicum Lloyd (1924)
- Stereum junghuhnii Fr. (1851)
- Stereum kurilense Yasuda (1924)
- Stereum lacunosum Velen. (1922)
- Stereum latissimum Berk. (1855)
- Stereum leoninum Skovst. (1956)
- Stereum lithocarpi Y.C. Dai (2011)
- Stereum lobatum (Kunze ex Fr.) Fr. (1838)
- Stereum luzoniense Ricker (1906)
- Stereum macrocystidiatum A.L. Welden (1967)
- Stereum magellanicum Ryvarden & Hjortstam (1987)
- Stereum melanopsis Sacc. & P. Syd. (1902)
- Stereum metallicum Rick (1940)
- Stereum mirabile Velen. (1922)
- Stereum molle Berk. (1873)
- Stereum necator Viala (1926)
- Stereum nigrorugosum Lloyd (1923)
- Stereum novomolle Lloyd (1922)
- Stereum nummularium Velen. (1922)
- Stereum nunezii Lloyd (1924)
- Stereum obliquum Mont. & Berk. (1844)
- Stereum obliteratum Rick (1940)
- Stereum obscurans Burt (1924)
- Stereum obscurum Lloyd (1915)
- Stereum occidentale Lloyd (1919)
- Stereum ochraceoflavum (Schwein.) Sacc. (1888)
- Stereum orthosporum E.H.L. Krause (1929)
- Stereum ostrea (Blume & T. Nees) Fr. (1838) - False turkey tail
- Stereum papillatosporum Rehill & B.K. Bakshi (1966)
- Stereum papyraceum Massee (1906)
- Stereum pekinense Imazeki (1943)
- Stereum pendulum R. Sasaki (1954)
- Stereum phalenarum Kalchbr. ex Bres. (1920)
- Stereum phoca Lloyd (1918)
- Stereum pileolatum E.H.L. Krause (1928)
- Stereum pseudannosum Lloyd (1920)
- Stereum pseudorimosum Boidin & Gilles (1989)
- Stereum reflexulum Lloyd (1936)
- Stereum rimosum Berk. (1851)
- Stereum roseohirsutum Lloyd (1924)
- Stereum roseum Yasuda (1922)
- Stereum rufofulvum (Mont.) Pat. & Lagerh. (1895)
- Stereum rugosum Pers. (1794)
- Stereum sanguinolentum (Alb. & Schwein.) Fr. (1838)
- Stereum scalare P. Karst. (1904)
- Stereum scutellatum G. Cunn. (1956)
- Stereum spumeum Burt (1920)
- Stereum striatum (Fr.) Fr. (1838)
- Stereum subtomentosum Pouzar (1964)
- Stereum sulphureum Rick (1938)
- Stereum tenerum Petch (1925)
- Stereum thindii A.B. De (1998)
- Stereum tjibodense Henn. (1899)
- Stereum tomentosum Van der Byl (1922)
- Stereum transvaalium Van der Byl (1929)
- Stereum traplianum Velen. (1922)
- Stereum turgidum Lloyd (1916)
- Stereum underwoodii Burt (1926)
- Stereum unguliforme Lloyd (1913)
- Stereum unicum Lloyd (1913)
- Stereum valdezii Lloyd (1923)
- Stereum variicolor Lloyd (1914)
- Stereum vellereum Berk. (1855)
- Stereum venosulum Henn. (1908)
- Stereum xylostroma Lloyd (1922)
