= Oukan =

Oukan is a vegan, Japanese fine dining restaurant in Berlin. It was founded by Tran Mai Huy Thong, a Vietnamese-German with a background in fashion design. The menu was developed with culinary advice from Buddhist monastics, based on the religious diet shōjin ryōri.

== Reception ==
Berliner Zeitung wrote in December 2021 that the food tasted "from something that takes getting used to to absolutely fantastic".
