= Calum Harris =

English vegan cook

Calum Harris (born 1999) is an English vegan cook and influencer known for promoting plant-based recipes.

== Life ==
Harris was born in 1999 and spent his childhood in Bromley. He describes himself as a home cook and not a chef; he gained cooking experience from his mother. He started social media in June 2019 to promote vegan recipes with accessible and simple ingredients. In 2022 he competed on The Great Cookbook Challenge with Jamie Oliver. Harris authored his first cookbook The 20 Minute Vegan in 2023 which features quick vegan recipes that are easy to make in 20 minutes. It became a UK bestseller.

In 2024, Harris signed a two-book deal with The Quarto Group Carnival. His book Proper Healthy: 80 Plant-Based Recipes with a Boost was published in 2025.

== Veganism ==
Harris became a vegan in 2018. In 2021, he became a member of "Plantboiis", a group of vegan social media influencers that came together to challenge stereotypes about veganism. During this time Harris was described as "building up one of the biggest UK-based vegan accounts on TikTok". Harris has challenged the misconception that vegans cannot get enough protein. He has commented that vegans are able to consume a protein-rich diet from the consumption of legumes, nuts, seeds, seitan, tofu and whole grains.

His book The 20-Minute Vegan challenges common misconceptions about vegan food such as it being difficult, expensive or low in protein.

== Selected publications ==
- The 20-Minute Vegan: Quick, Easy Food. Bluebird. 2023. ISBN 978-1035013654.
- Proper Healthy: 80 Plant-Based Recipes With a Boost. Carnival. 2025. ISBN 978-0711298644.
