= Mianjin =

Mianjin may refer to:

- Seitan, a food made from gluten
- Jagera, an endonym of an Aboriginal Australian tribe
- Turrbal, an endonym of another Aboriginal Australian tribe
