= Latiao =

Chinese snack food

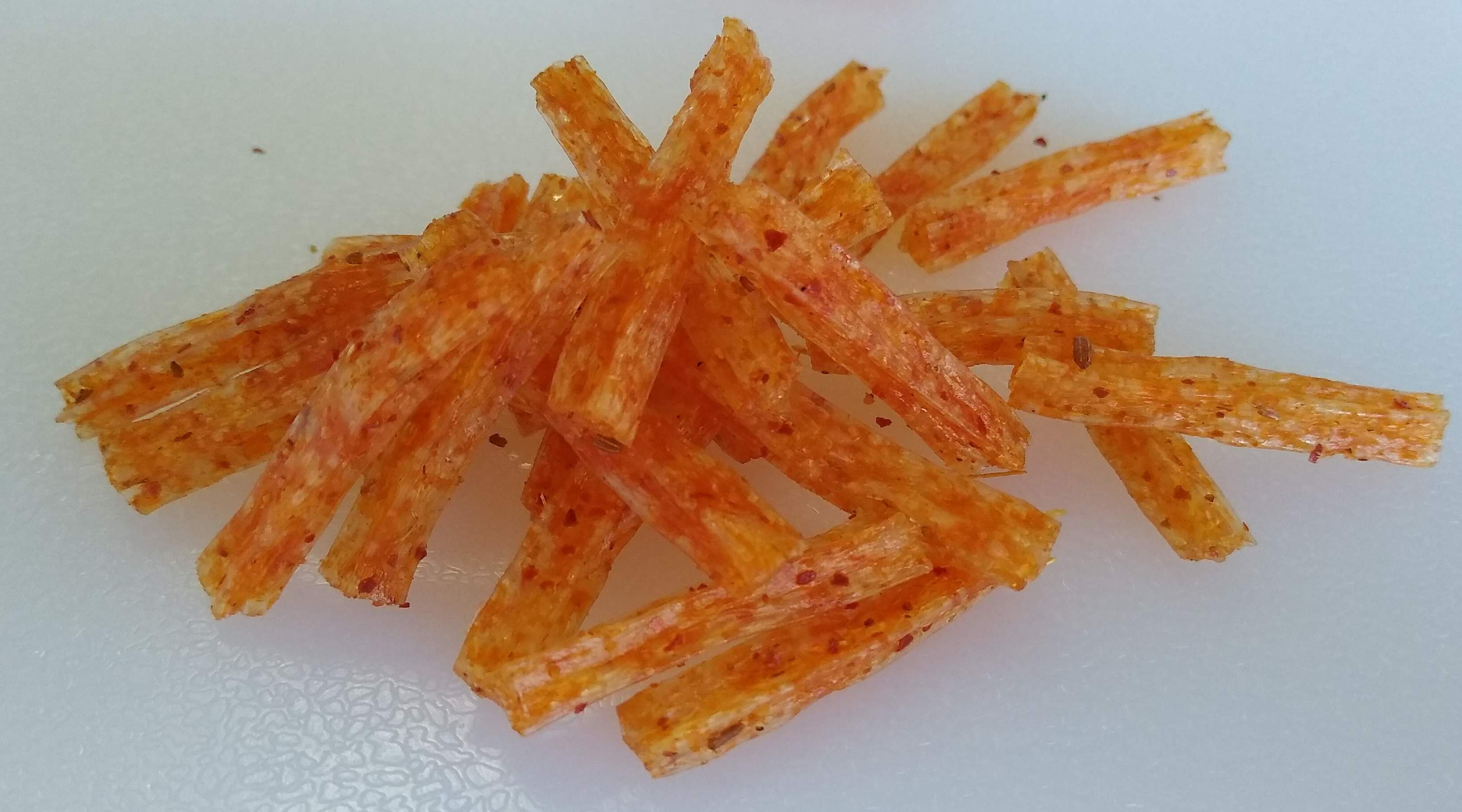
- Alternative names: Spicy stick/hot strip/spicy strip/Spicy Gluten Stick
- Type: Snack
- Place of origin: China
- Region or state: Pingjiang County, Hunan
- Main ingredients: Wheat flour, salt, sugar, spices
- Ingredients generally used: Monosodium glutamate (sodium glutamate), other food additives, vegetable oil
- Food energy (per 100 g serving): 375 kcal (1,570 kJ)
Nutritional value
(per 100 g serving)
- Protein: 9.9 g
- Fat: 14.4 g
- Carbohydrate: 48 g

Latiao
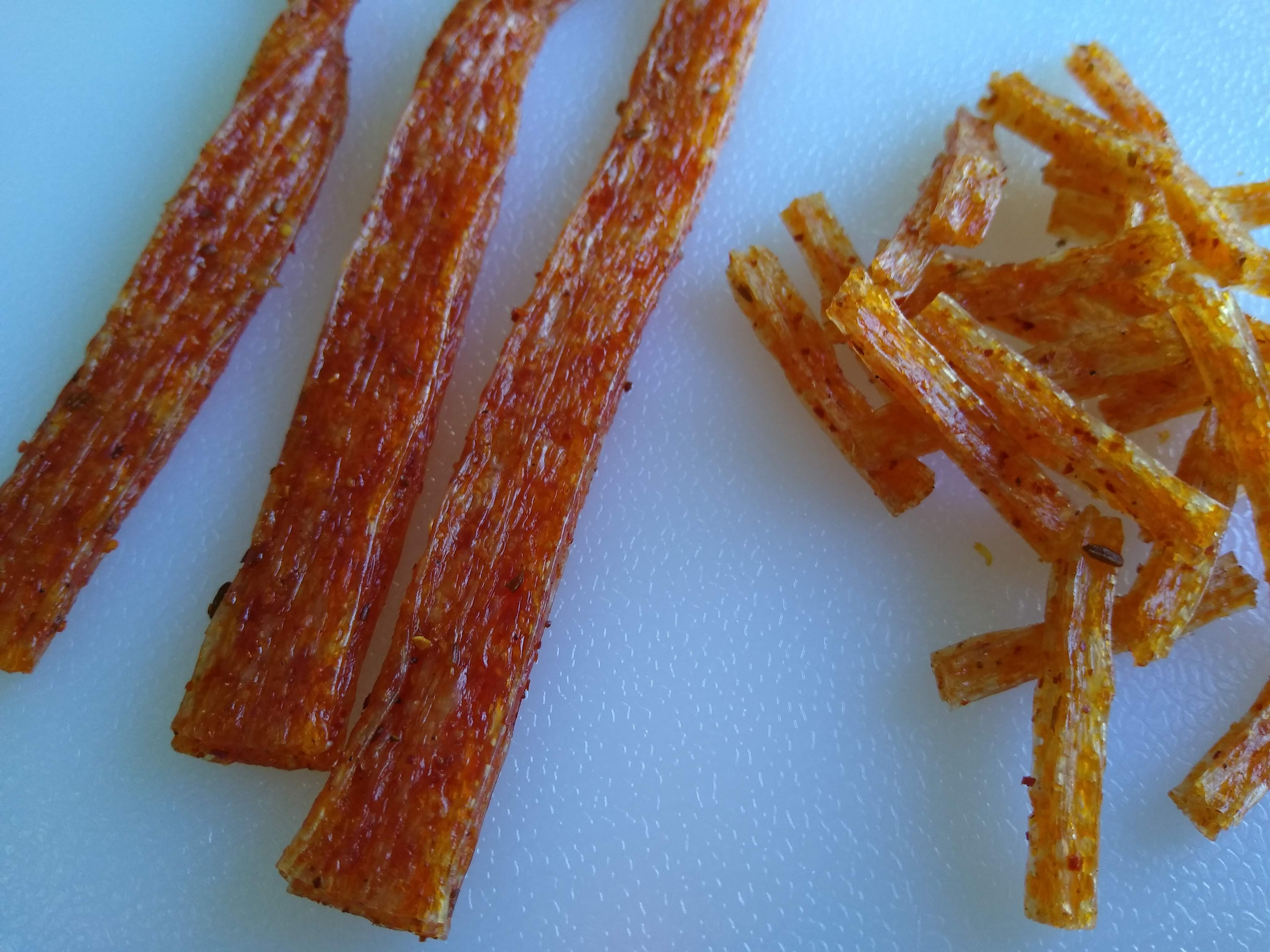
- Latiao of different lengths
- Simplified Chinese: 辣条
- Traditional Chinese: 辣條
- Literal meaning: Spicy stick/strip
Transcriptions
Standard Mandarin
- Hanyu Pinyin: làtiáo

Latiao (simplified Chinese: 辣条; traditional Chinese: 辣條; lit. 'Spicy stick/spicy strip') is a popular Chinese snack consisting of strips made of wheat flour (especially wheat gluten), flavored with chili pepper. Its taste has been described chewy, spicy, sweet, and tangy.

Latiao is commercially produced by extrusion from a mixture of gluten-rich dough. Beyond chili pepper, salt, and sugar, other seasonings include peppercorn, cumin, and cinnamon. Commercial preparations may contain flavor enhancers, pigments, and preservatives. Specific additives used in latiao have been the subject of scrutiny in China.

Latiao can be made at home using wheat gluten. The wheat gluten is briefly soaked, then steamed, then coated with a spiced chili oil made by frying aromatic spices and mixing with chili powder, cumin, and Sichuan peppercorns. The seasoned gluten is rested for an hour to absorb the flavors before serving.

== History ==
Latiao originated in Pingjiang County, Hunan. It was at first called mianjin (simplified Chinese: 面筋; traditional Chinese: 麵筋, literally "wheat gluten"). Later, Pingjiang people called it mala (Chinese: 麻辣) after the numbing-spicy flavor. Latiao is made from flour that is cooked under high pressure and heat, and seasoned with hot spices. Pingjiang has a history of making dried sauce, spicy sauce and spicy bean curd, which are important parts of the Pingjiang industry.

In 1998, a major flood disaster occurred in Pingjiang County, which led to a serious loss of agricultural products. Local soybean crops were largely wiped out by the flood. Soybeans were also used as the main raw material for sauce industry, and the flood caused a devastating blow to the dried sauce industry. Qiu Pingjiang, Li Mengneng, and Zhong Qingyuan used wheat flour instead of soy flour. Using single-screw extrusion machinery, adding chili, pepper, cumin, sugar, salt, vegetable oil and other condiments, they invented Latiao.

In the 1990s Latiao debuted and quickly became popular across China. At the beginning, it was sold in small shops, before expanding to supermarkets.

As early as 2015, the Chinese provinces of Gansu, Gubei, and Hainan launched crackdowns on unhygienic manufacturing conditions.

In February 2016, the British TV broadcaster BBC aired a three-part documentary on Chinese New Year celebrations in which the two presenters were seen roaming a typical Chinese snack street, Latiao in hand. Min Quanlu, production manager of Weilong Foods, a major latiao maker, told Xinhua that the company packaged the snack by hand until 2011, when demand exploded. "We make 600 million yuan's worth of latiao each year and employ about 2,000 workers," Min said. "About 20 percent of our products are sold in the domestic market, and the rest goes overseas."

=== 2018–2019 crackdown ===
Latiao has been subject to a number of food safety crackdowns.

In May 2018, the food safety authority of Shanxi Province found that Weilong does not meet the local safety standards. Specifically, Weilong latiao uses sorbic acid and dehydroacetic acid while the local standard does not allow their use in "flavoured flour products". In September 2018, Hubei's Food and Drug Administration followed suit and suspended sales of Weilong.

In March 2019, China Central Television's 315 Gala (an annual consumer's rights TV program on World Consumer Rights Day) exposed the conditions of several other Latiao factories in Henan and Hunan. The Gala alleges that questionable food additives and sanitary practices are used.

- At Xiachedan Latiao factory at Gaochang Village in Kaifeng, Henan, videotape shows dust mixed with grease oozing from machines. More than 10 types of additives were seen lying on the ground.
- At Oufei Latiao factory in Tantougao Village, the machines were again found to be greasy.
- At Aiqingwangzi factory at Wangu Village in Yueyang, Hunan, a worker could be seen taking gluten slices from the ground and then putting them into machines.
- At Weiquan Food Co in Futan Village, Latiao was set on dirty rags, while workers did not wear masks or gloves. They packaged latiao with their hands.

By this time, the snack had faced certain restrictions and bans throughout different provinces in the country, including bans on sales near schools.

In September 2019, Weilong clarified that its products are in complete compliance with the food additive rules in Henan and Hunan, which handles flour-based snacks (such as latiao) differently. The Health Commission of Henan Province had declared in August 2019 that it plans to abolish these local rules by October 2019, pending the development of new national standards.

As all the scrutiny on latiao's food additive content proceeds, China has not yet adopted a uniform set of health and food safety standards throughout the country. The draft National Standard on Food Additives was released by the National Health Commission of the People's Republic of China on May 14, 2019, but has not yet taken effect as of September 2019.

In December 2019, the State Administration for Market Regulation issued a notice on the classification of latiao and its allowed food additive content. All latiao is to be classified as "instant food (flavored flour product)" by January 31, 2020. The new National Standard on Food Additives GB 2760 is to be followed, effective immediately.

== In popular culture ==
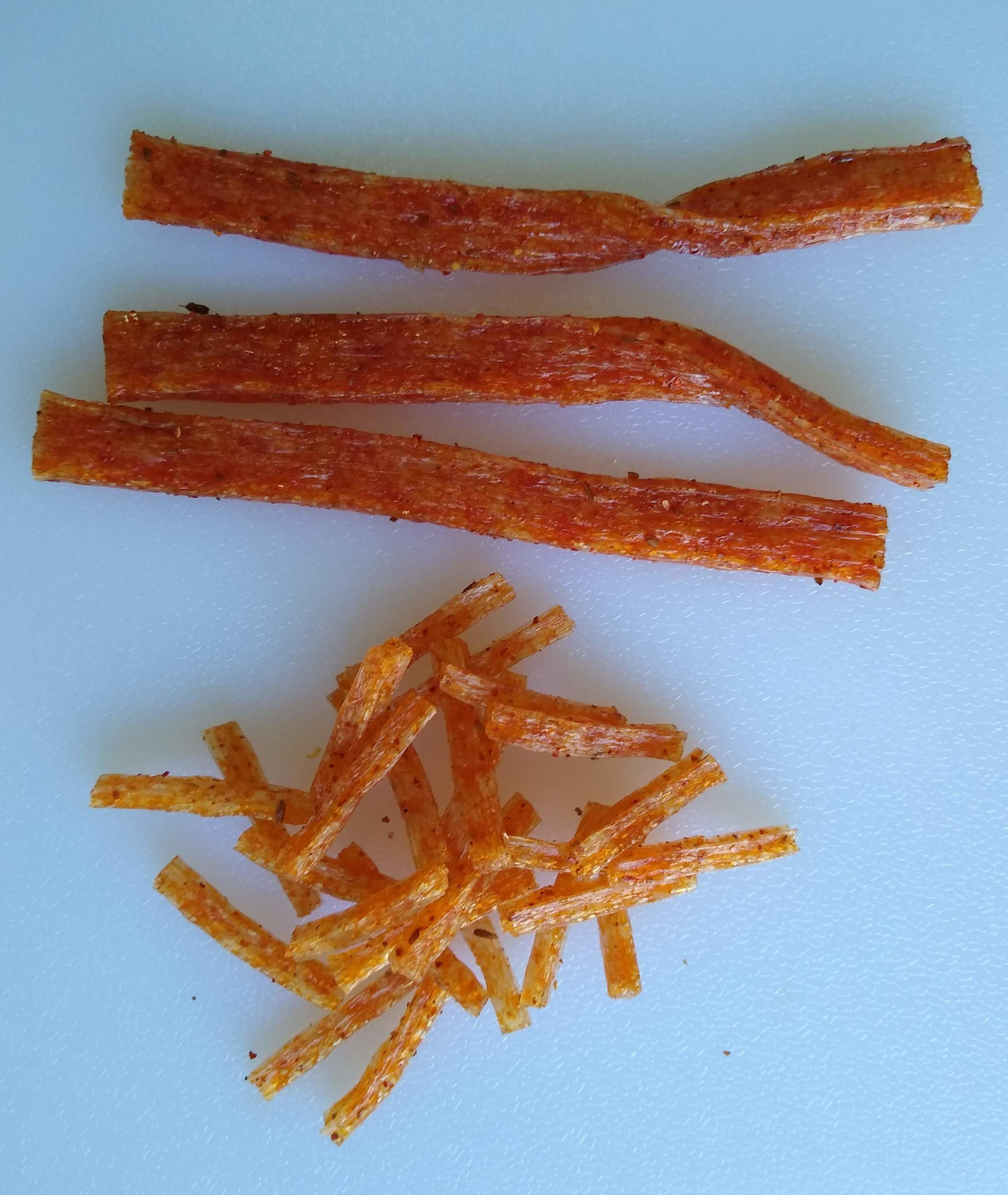
Latiao

In August 2026, the South China Morning Post reported that consumption of latiao outside of China had risen in recent months, spurred by the online trend of Chinamaxxing.
