= Snack =

Small food portions consumed outside of the main meals of the day

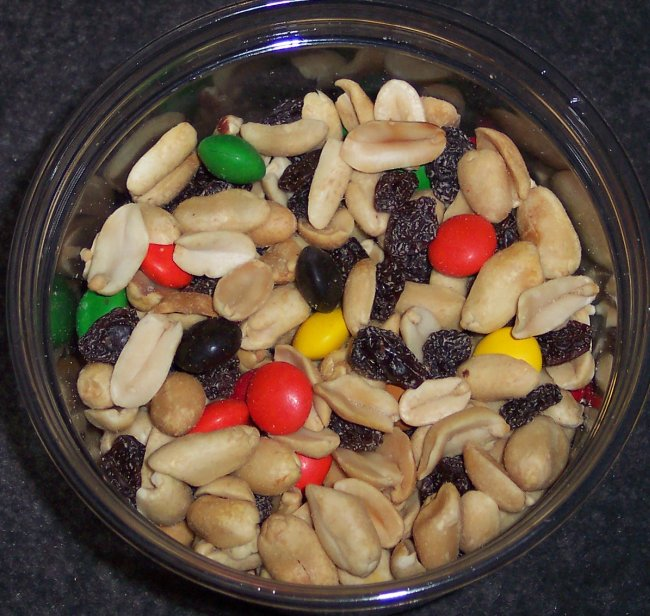
Trail mix is a snack food commonly made with peanuts, raisins, and candy, such as M&M's.

A snack is a small portion of food generally eaten between meals. While many snack foods are packaged, snacks may also include fresh ingredients commonly available at home which do not require lengthy preparation. Fruit, lunch meat, nuts, and candy are often consumed as snacks. With the spread of convenience stores, packaged snack foods became a significantly profitable business.

Snack foods are typically designed to be portable, quick, and satisfying. Processed snack foods, as one form of convenience food, are designed to be less perishable, more durable, and more portable than prepared foods. They often contain substantial amounts of sweeteners, preservatives, and appealing ingredients such as chocolate, peanuts, and specially designed flavors (such as flavored potato chips). Aside from the use of additives, the viability of packaging so that food quality can be preserved without degradation is also important for commercialization.

A snack eaten shortly before going to bed or during the night may be called a "bedtime snack", "late night snack", or "midnight snack".

== North America ==
=== Canada ===
In 2010, the average Canadian ate 300 snacks throughout the entire year. Canadian identity is often associated with snack foods that are sold in Canada due to economic nationalism. Some Canadian snacks include ketchup chips, Smarties, Coffee Crisp, Kinder Surprise, Jos Louis, Big Turk, and Nanaimo bars.

=== United States ===
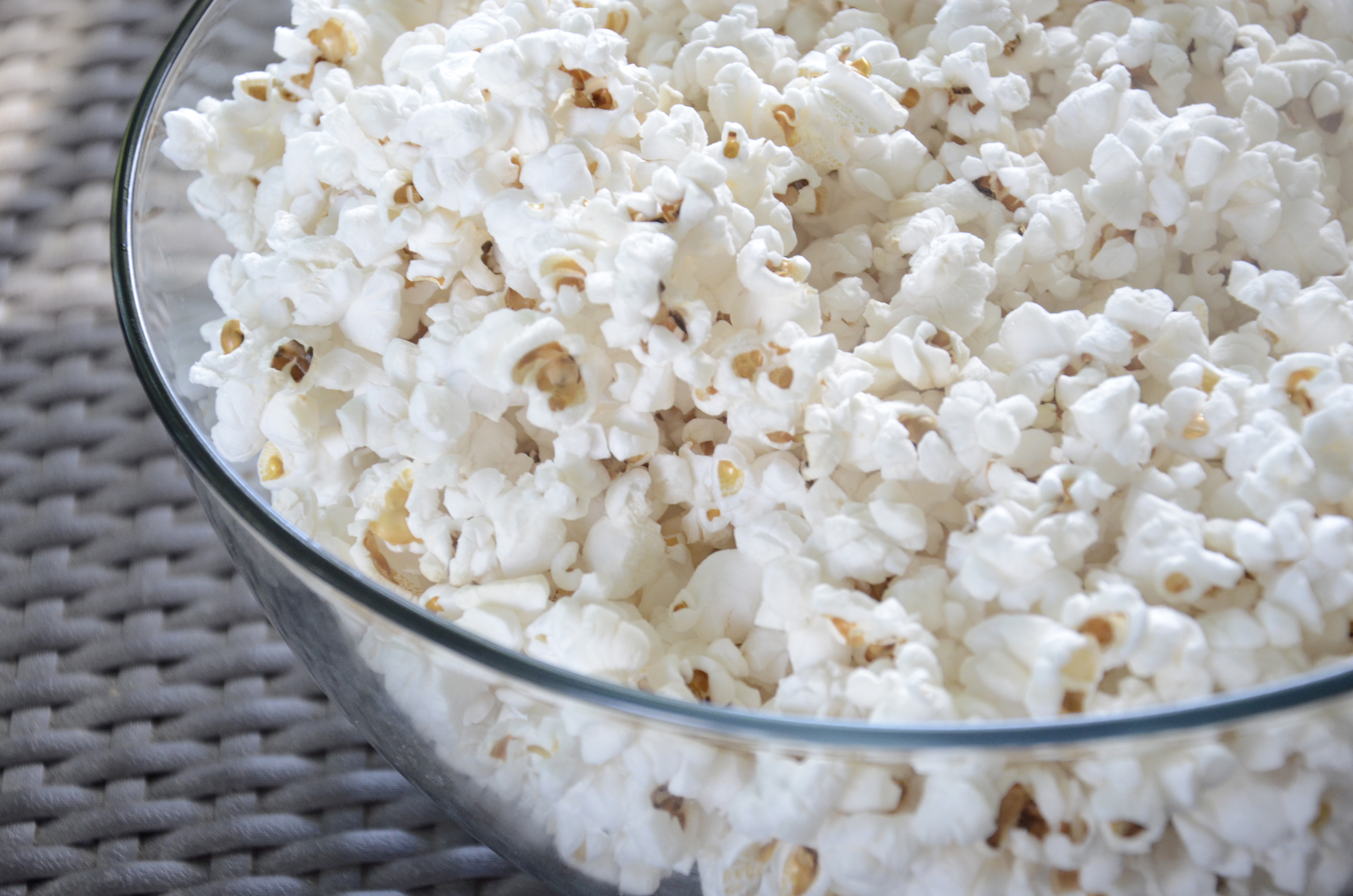
Bowl of popcorn.

In the United States, a popular snack food is the peanut. Peanuts first arrived from South America via slave ships and became incorporated into African-inspired cooking on southern plantations. After the Civil War, the taste for peanuts spread north, where they were incorporated into the culture of such popular events as baseball games and vaudeville theaters.

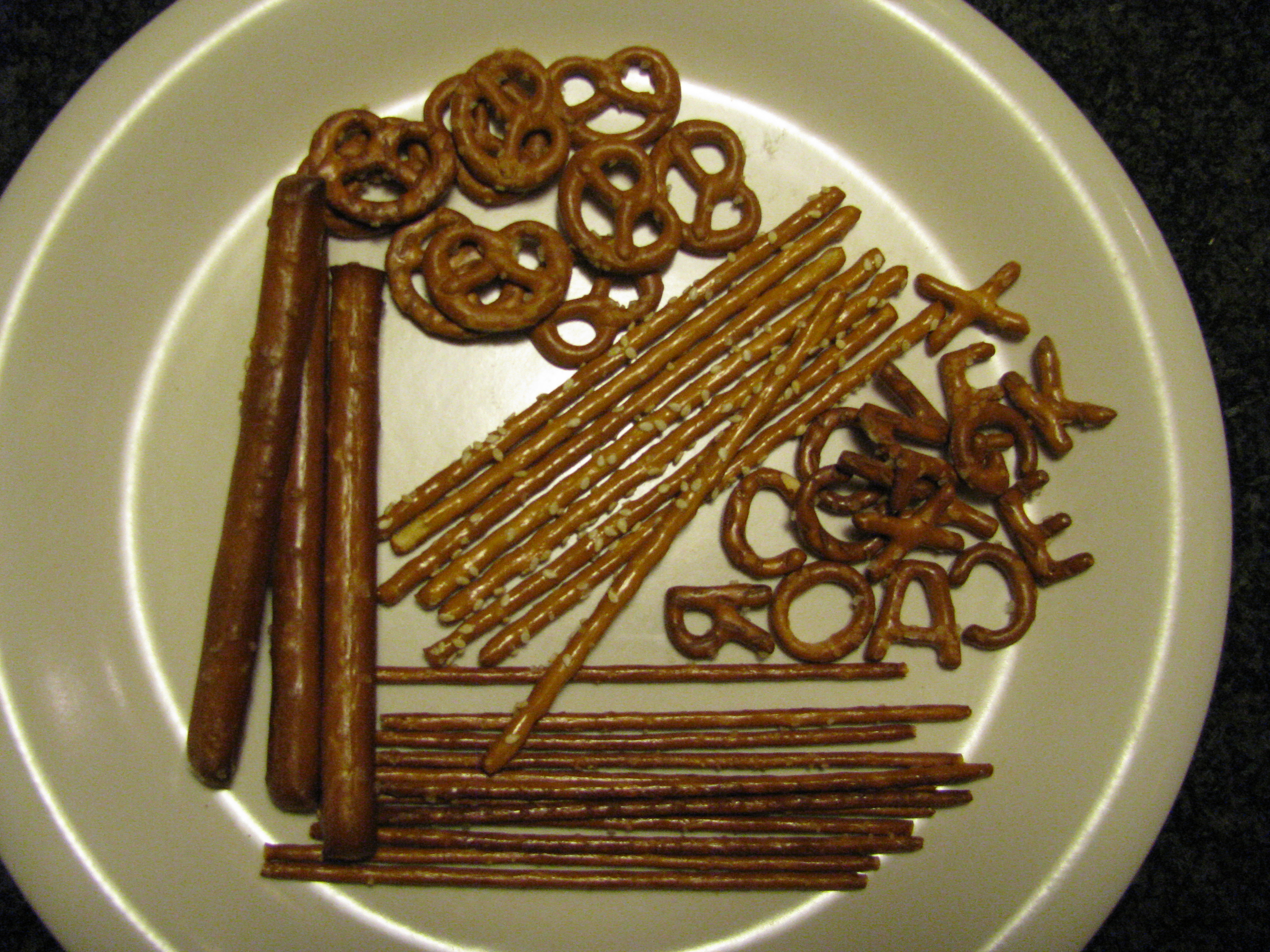
Numerous types of hard pretzel.

Along with popcorn (also of South American origin), snacks bore the stigma of being sold by unhygienic street vendors. The middle-class etiquette of the Victorian era (1837–1901) categorized any food that did not require proper usage of utensils as lower-class.

Pretzels were introduced to North America by the Dutch, via New Amsterdam in the 17th century. In the 1860s, the snack was still associated with immigrants, unhygienic street vendors, and saloons. Due to loss of business during the Prohibition era (1920–1933), pretzels underwent rebranding to make them more appealing to the public. As packaging revolutionized snack foods, allowing sellers to reduce contamination risk, while making it easy to advertise brands with a logo, pretzels boomed in popularity, bringing many other types of snack foods with it. By the 1950s, snacking had become an all-American pastime, becoming an internationally recognized emblem of middle American life.

== Middle East ==
Nuts are a staple of snacks in the Middle East. Among the many varieties available within the region, the most popular are almonds, walnuts, hazelnuts, pine nuts, and pistachios. According to archeological evidence, nuts have been part of the Middle Eastern diet for centuries with ancient civilizations taking advantage of them for their health benefits. The health benefits of nuts comes from them being good sources of protein, healthy fats, fibers, vitamins and minerals. Nuts have now become a regular snack with a 119 billion dollar market as of 2022 that is projected to continue growing into 2023. Nuts can be prepared in a variety of ways, such as by roasting them with spices and lemon juice or incorporating them into food and desserts such as baklava, knafeh, and kibbeh.

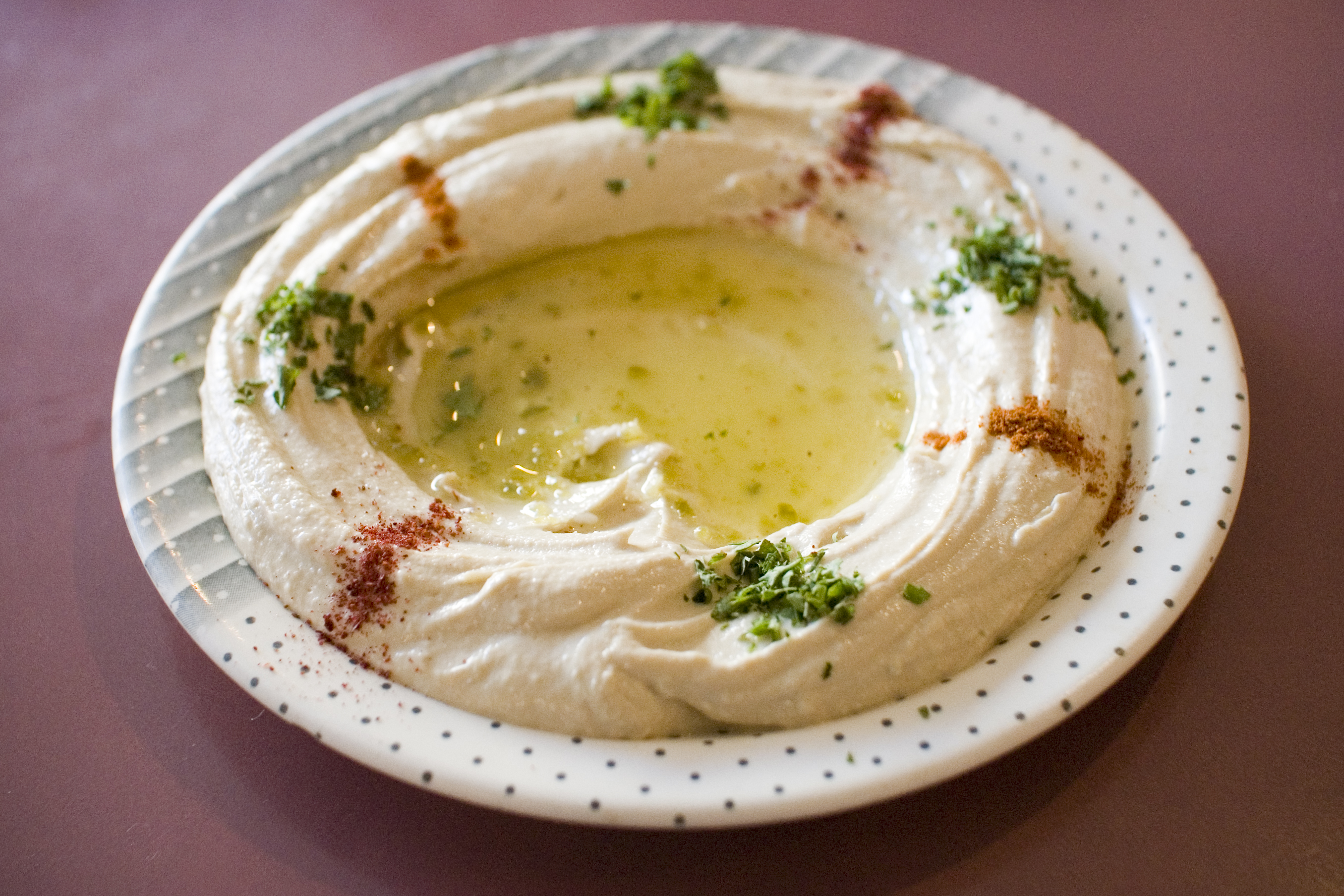
Hummus

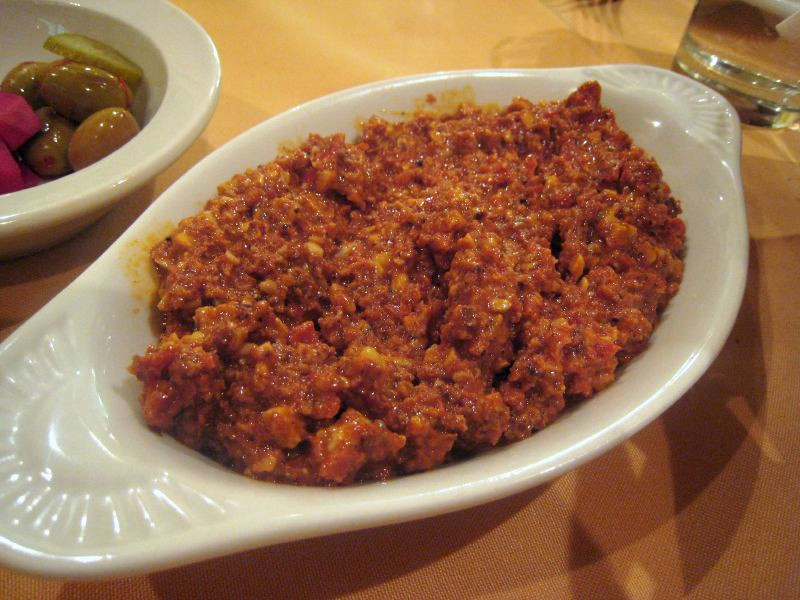
Mouhammara

Spreads and dips are eaten with pita bread. The most popular dip in the middle east is hummus. Hummus is a blend of chickpeas, tahini, lemon, and garlic usually served with olive oil and paprika on top. Hummus's origins can be traced back to a Syrian cookbook from the 13th century. Other dips are also popularly served such as mouhammara and baba ganoush. Mouhammara is a walnut, tahini, and roasted red pepper dip served with olive oil on top originating from the Syrian city of Aleppo. Baba ganoush is a spread made from roasted eggplants, olive oil, and other vegetables. The origins of baba ganoush are not clear with many conflicting pieces of evidence pointing to multiple countries of origin. A sweet dip is Ashta, a cream made from milk, rose or orange blossom water, and ghee, which is usually accompanied with honey.

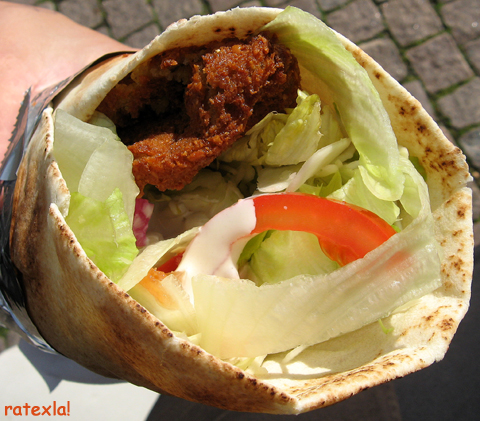
Falafel sandwich

Many popular snacks in the Middle East are obtained from street vendors due to low cost and convenience of eating on the go. Many of these snacks consist of a protein with bread. Falafel consists of many little fried balls of ground chickpeas or fava beans with herbs, spices served in pita bread with tahini sauce and a choice of vegetables. Falafel is believed to originate from Egypt around 1000 years ago by Egyptian Copts. Shawarma is served in a similar fashion to falafel, pita bread with sauce and vegetables, but instead prepared by slowly cooking layers of meat on a spit before thinly slicing it.

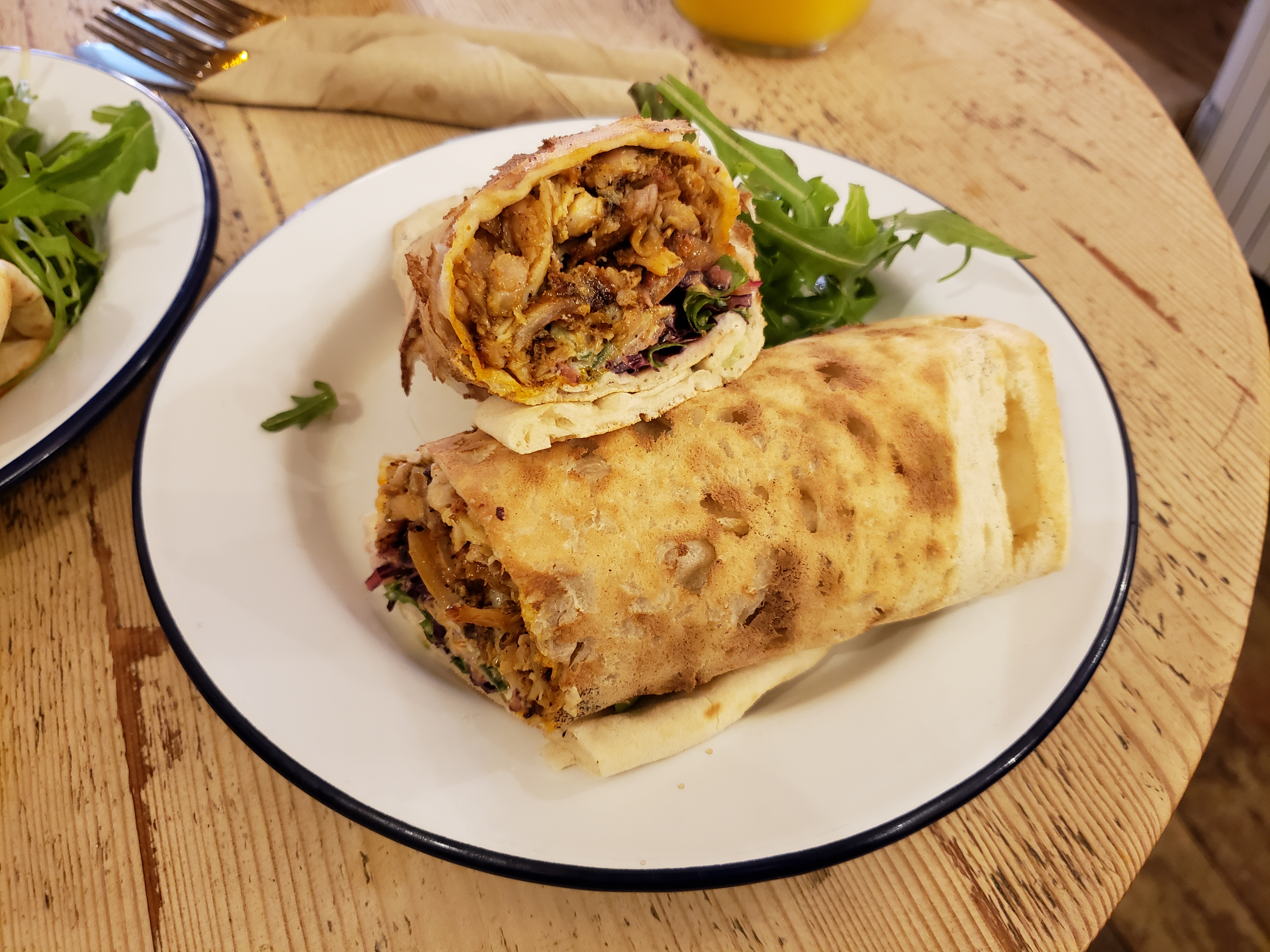
Chicken shawarma sandwich

== Asia ==
=== Japan ===
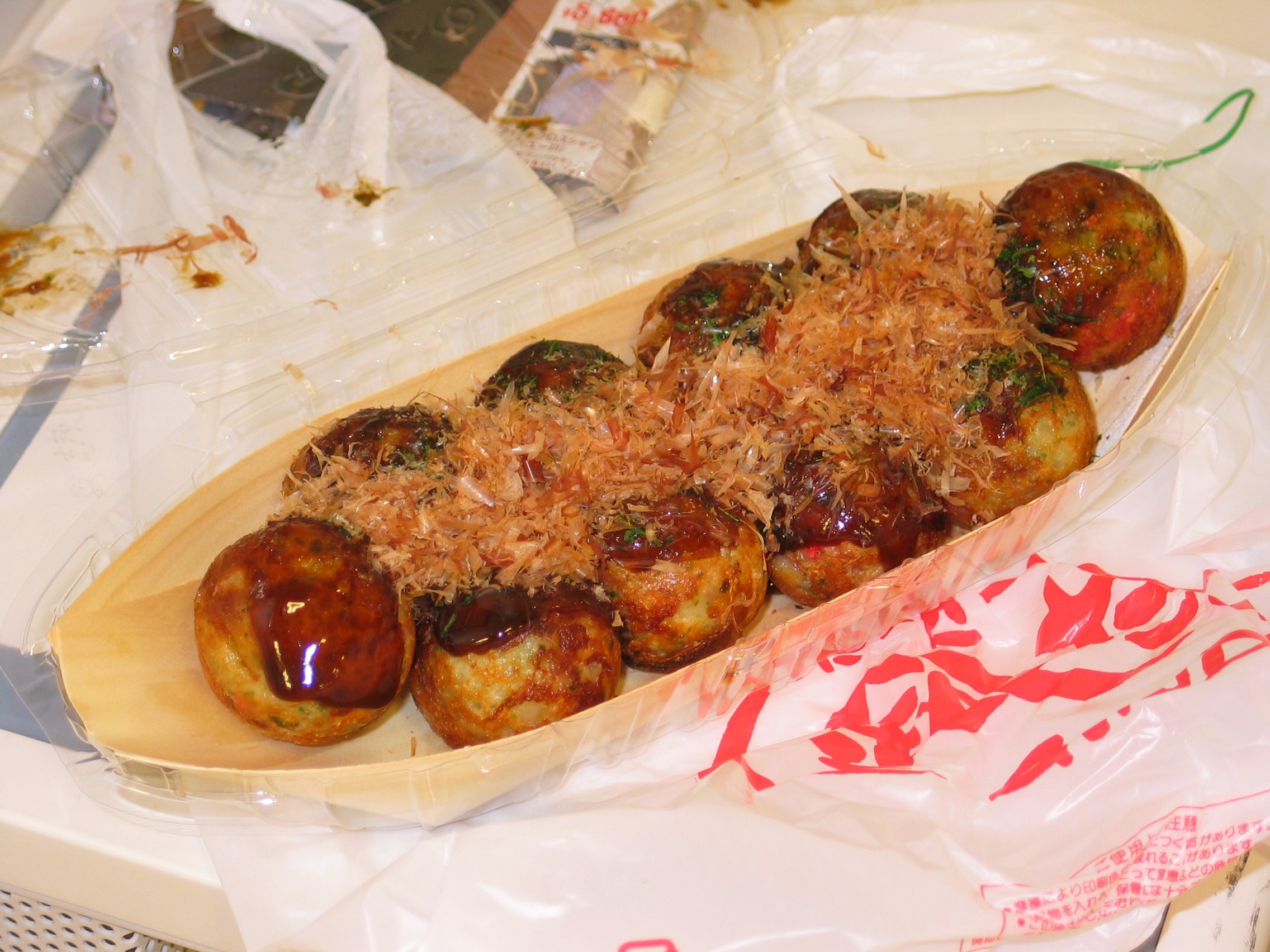
A serving of Takoyaki, a popular Japanese street snack (octopus-filled batter balls).

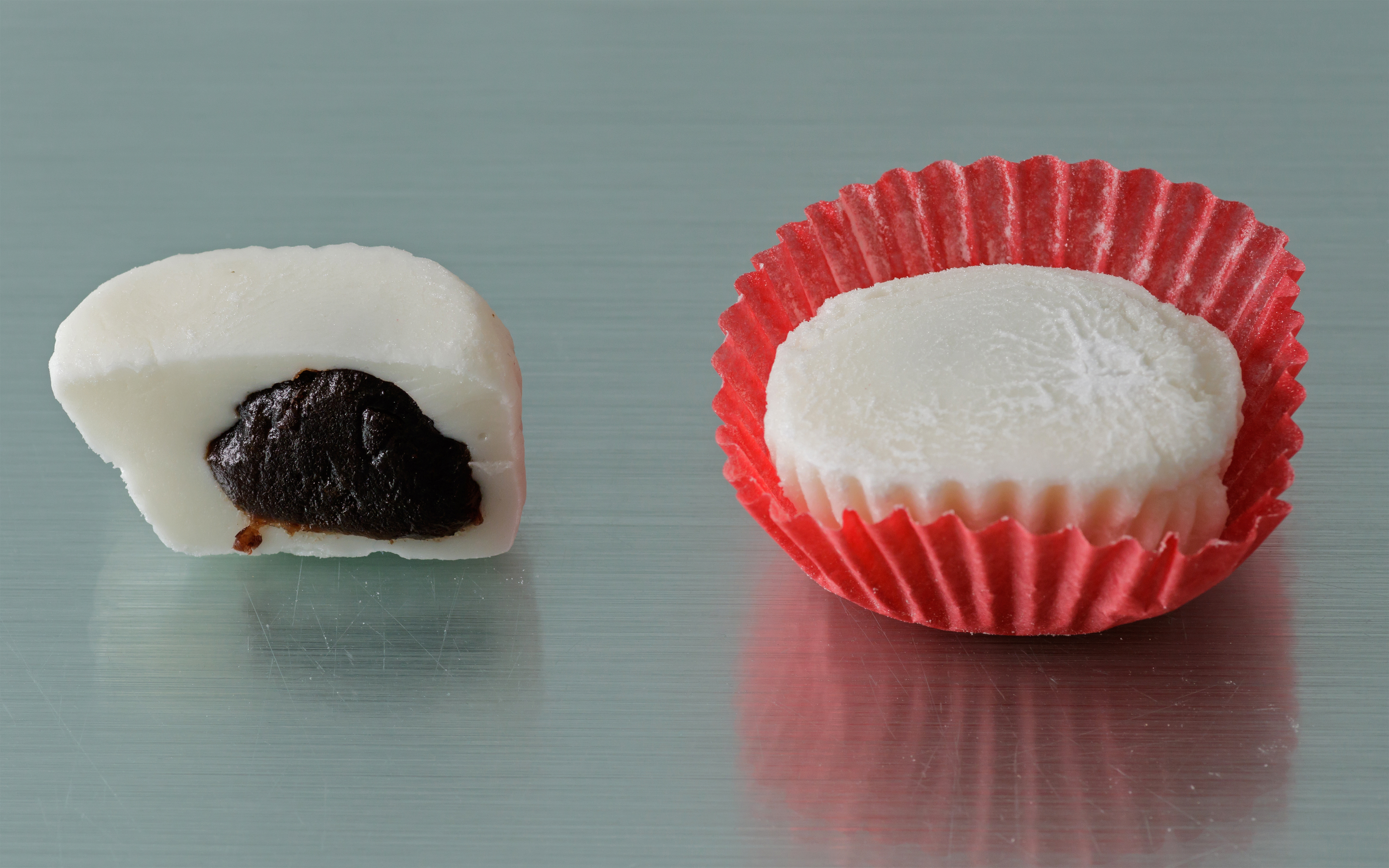
Traditional Mochi filled with sweet red bean paste, often enjoyed during festivals.

In Japan, rice-based snacks such as senbei (rice crackers) and mochi (pounded rice cakes) have been part of traditional food culture for centuries, often consumed during festivals and tea ceremonies. Modern packaged snacks have also become highly popular, with products like Pocky and uniquely flavored Kit Kat bars (including matcha green tea and wasabi varieties) gaining both domestic and international recognition. Convenience stores (konbini) play a central role in snack culture by offering ready-to-eat foods such as onigiri (rice balls), karaage (fried chicken), and sandwiches alongside packaged chips and sweets.

Street snacks are also common, particularly at festivals (matsuri). Popular examples include takoyaki (octopus-filled batter balls), taiyaki (fish-shaped pastries filled with sweet bean paste or custard), and dorayaki (pancakes filled with sweet red bean paste). Seasonal snacks reflect local agricultural traditions, such as sakura mochi (rice cake filled with red bean paste and wrapped in a cherry blossom leaf), which is associated with cherry blossom season in spring. Snack companies in Japan also collaborate with popular anime and manga franchises to produce limited-edition flavors, which become sought after by collectors and fans.

== Nutrition ==
Government bodies, such as Health Canada, recommend that people make a conscious effort to eat more healthy, natural snacks, such as fruit, vegetables, nuts, and cereal grains while avoiding high-calorie, low-nutrient junk food.

A 2010 study showed that children in the United States snacked on average six times per day, approximately twice as often as American children in the 1970s. This represents consumption of roughly 570 calories more per day than U.S. children consumed in the 1970s.

== Types ==
- Bagel with cream cheese
- Bars
- Bitterballen
- Candy bar
- Carrot Chips
- Chaat
- Cheese, a larger cold prepared snack
- Cheese puffs/cheese curls
- Chocolate-coated marshmallow treats
- Corn chips and Tortilla chips
- Cocktail sausage
- Cookies
- Crackers
- Deviled eggs
- Doughnuts
- Dried fruits
- Drinkable yogurt
- Edamame, fresh or dried
- Granola bars
- Falafel
- Flour tortilla with a filling
- Frozen berries
- Fruit, whole, sliced, Fruit salad, Fruit cocktail
- Ice cream
- Jell-O
- Jerky
- Kaassoufflé
- Latiao
- Lunchables
- Milkshake
- Muffins
- Nuts
- Pound cake
- Papadum
- Peanuts
- Pita bread
- Popcorn
- Pork rinds
- Potato chips
- Pakoda
- Pretzels
- Raisins
- Ratatouille
- Rice cake
- Rice crackers, distinguished from the above
- Samosa
- Seeds
- Shortbread
- Smoked salmon
- Smoothie
- Teacake
- Trail mix
- Vegetables (e.g., carrots, celery, cherry tomatoes)
- Yogurt

== See also ==
- Canapés
- Junk food
- List of brand name snack foods
- List of foods
- List of Indian snack foods
- List of Indonesian snacks
- List of Japanese snacks
- List of snack foods
- List of snack foods by country
- Savoury (dish)
