= Buddhist cuisine =

East Asian cuisine informed by Buddhism

Buddhist vegetarian cuisine
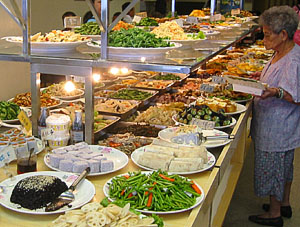
- A vegetarian restaurant in Taipei, Taiwan, serving Buddhist cuisine in buffet style

Chinese name
- Traditional Chinese: 齋菜
- Simplified Chinese: 斋菜
Transcriptions
Standard Mandarin
- Hanyu Pinyin: zhāi cài
Wu
- Romanization: [tsa tsɛ]
Yue: Cantonese
- Jyutping: zaai^{1}coi^{3}
Southern Min
- Hokkien POJ: che-chhài

Vietnamese name
- Vietnamese alphabet: đồ chay
- Chữ Nôm: 塗齋

Korean name
- Hangul: 사찰음식
- Hanja: 寺刹飮食
Transcriptions
- Revised Romanization: sachal eumsik
- McCune–Reischauer: sach'al ŭmsik

Japanese name
- Kanji: 精進料理
- Kana: しょうじんりょうり
Transcriptions
- Revised Hepburn: shōjin ryōri
- Kunrei-shiki: syôzin ryôri

Filipino name
- Tagalog: Lutuing Budista

Khmer name
- Khmer: ម្ហូបព្រះពុទ្ធសាសនា

Buddhist cuisine is an Asian cuisine that is followed by monks and many believers from areas historically influenced by Mahayana Buddhism. It is vegetarian or vegan, and it is based on the Dharmic concept of ahimsa (non-violence). Vegetarianism is common in other Dharmic faiths such as Hinduism, Jainism and Sikhism, as well as East Asian religions, like Taoism. While monks, nuns and a minority of believers are vegetarian year-round, many believers follow the Buddhist vegetarian diet for celebrations.

In Buddhism, cooking is often seen as a spiritual practice that produces the nourishment which the body needs to work hard and meditate. The origin of "Buddhist food" as a distinct sub-style of cuisine is tied to monasteries, where one member of the community would have the duty of being the head cook and supplying meals that paid respect to the strictures of Buddhist precepts. Temples that were open to visitors from the general public might also serve meals to them and a few temples effectively run functioning restaurants on the premises. In Japan, this culinary custom, recognized as shōjin ryōri (精進料理) or devotion cuisine, is commonly offered at numerous temples, notably in Kyoto. This centuries-old culinary tradition, primarily associated with religious contexts, is seldom encountered beyond places like temples, religious festivals, and funerals. A more recent version, more Chinese in style, is prepared by the Ōbaku school of zen, and known as fucha ryōri (普茶料理); this is served at the head temple of Manpuku-ji, as well as various subtemples. In modern times, commercial restaurants have also latched on to the style, catering both to practicing and non-practicing lay people.

== Philosophies governing food ==
=== Vegetarianism ===
Most of the dishes considered to be uniquely Buddhist are vegetarian, but not all Buddhist traditions require vegetarianism of lay followers or clergy. Vegetarian eating is primarily associated with the East and Southeast Asian tradition in China, Vietnam, Japan, and Korea where it is commonly practiced by clergy and may be observed by laity on holidays or as a devotional practice.

In the Mahayana tradition, several sutras of the Mahayana canon contain explicit prohibitions against consuming meat, including sections of the Lankavatara Sutra and Surangama Sutra. The Mahayana monastic community in Chinese Buddhism, Vietnamese Buddhism and most of Korean Buddhism strictly adhere to vegetarianism.

Theravada Buddhist monks and nuns consume food by gathering alms themselves, and generally must eat whatever foods are offered to them, including meat. Buddhist monks were not permitted to grow, store, or cook meals for themselves. The exception to this alms rule is when monks and nuns have seen, heard or known that animal(s) have been specifically killed to feed the alms-seeker, in which case consumption of such meat would be karmically negative in ancient India. The same restriction is also followed by some lay Buddhists and is known as the consumption of "Threefold Pure Meat" (三净肉). The Pāli Scriptures also indicated that Lord Buddha refused a proposal by his disciple Devadatta to mandate vegetarianism in the monastic precepts.This rule is also seen in the Vinaya through stories like General Siha offering meat to the Buddha, and another account where thieves left meat for the nun Uppalavanna, which she accepted because it met the allowed conditions. This Mahayana text also notes that some meats are completely forbidden, such as human, dog, elephant, and certain wild animals as it was seen as unclean.

Tibetan Buddhism has long accepted that the practical difficulties in obtaining vegetables and grains within most of Tibet make it impossible to insist upon vegetarianism; however, many leading Tibetan Buddhist teachers agree upon the great worth of practicing vegetarianism whenever and wherever possible, such as Chatral Rinpoche, a lifelong advocate of vegetarianism who famously released large numbers of fish caught for food back into the ocean once a year, and who wrote about the practice of saving lives.

While Mahayana Buddhism is strictly vegetarian, Theravada Buddhists laypeople and monastic while not required to be vegetarian, may choose to be, based on personal compassionate reasons and consider that one may practice vegetarianism as part of cultivating Bodhisattvas's paramita.

=== Other restrictions ===
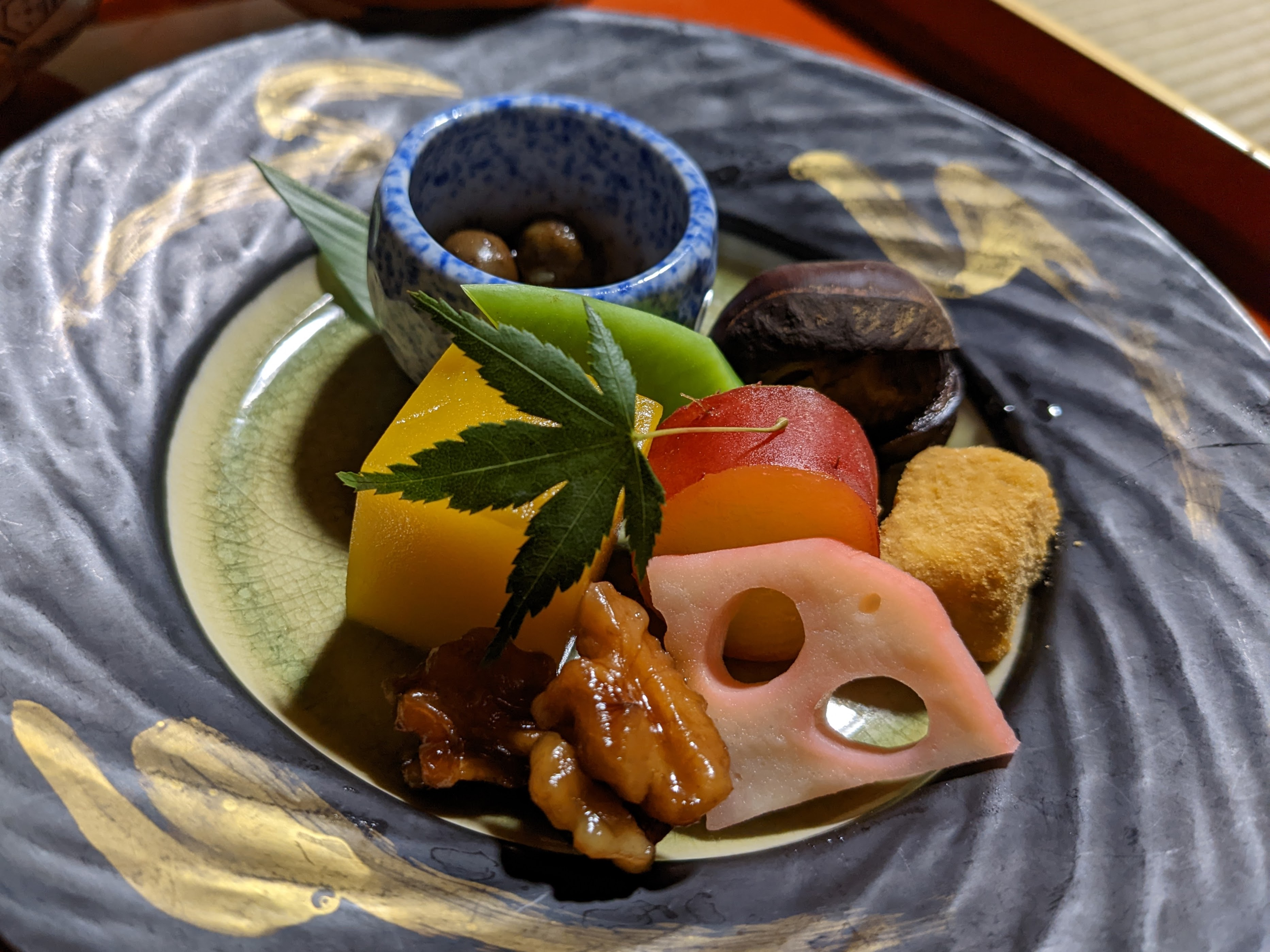
Shōjin-ryōri served at Mount Koya, Japan

In addition to the ban on garlic, practically all Mahayana monastics in China, Korea, Vietnam and Japan specifically avoid eating strong-smelling plants, traditionally asafoetida, shallot, mountain leek and Chinese onion, which together with garlic are referred to as wǔ hūn (五葷, or 'Five Acrid, pungent and Strong-smelling Vegetables') or wǔ xīn (五辛 or 'Five Spices') as they tend to excite senses. This is based on teachings found in the Brahmajala Sutra, the Surangama Sutra and the Lankavatara Sutra, and Traditional Chinese medicine. In modern times this rule is often interpreted to include other vegetables of the onion genus, as well as coriander. The origin of this additional restriction is from the Indic region and can still be found among some believers of Hinduism and Jainism. Unlike meat, avoiding these foods is not about killing life. Instead, Buddhists believe the strong flavors can stir up passion, irritability, and imbalance, which interfere with inner calm and the mind. Because these foods are considered overstimulating, some traditions recommend avoiding them, especially for meditation practice.

The consumption of non-vegetarian food by strict Buddhists is also subject to various restrictions. As well as the aforementioned "triply clean meat" rule followed by Theravada monks, nuns, and some lay Buddhists, many Chinese Buddhists avoid the consumption of beef, large animals, and exotic species. Some Buddhists abstain from eating offal (organ meat), known as xiàshui (下水).

Alcohol and other drugs are also avoided by many Buddhists because of their effects on the mind and "mindfulness". It is part of the Five Precepts which dictate that one is "not to take any substance that will cloud the mind." Caffeinated drinks may sometimes be included under this restriction.

=== Simple and natural ===
In theory and practice, many regional styles of cooking may be adapted to be "Buddhist" as long as the cook, with the above restrictions in mind, prepares the food, generally in simple preparations, with expert attention to its quality, wholesomeness and flavor. Often working on a tight budget, the monastery cook would have to make the most of whatever ingredients were available.

In Tenzo kyokun ("Instructions for the Zen Cook"), Soto Zen founder Eihei Dogen wrote:

In preparing food, it is essential to be sincere and to respect each ingredient regardless of how coarse or fine it is. (...) A rich buttery soup is not better as such than a broth of wild herbs. In handling and preparing wild herbs, do so as you would the ingredients for a rich feast, wholeheartedly, sincerely, clearly. When you serve the monastic assembly, they and you should taste only the flavour of the Ocean of Reality, the Ocean of unobscured Awake Awareness, not whether or not the soup is creamy or made only of wild herbs. In nourishing the seeds of living in the Way, rich food and wild grass are not separate.

== Ingredients ==
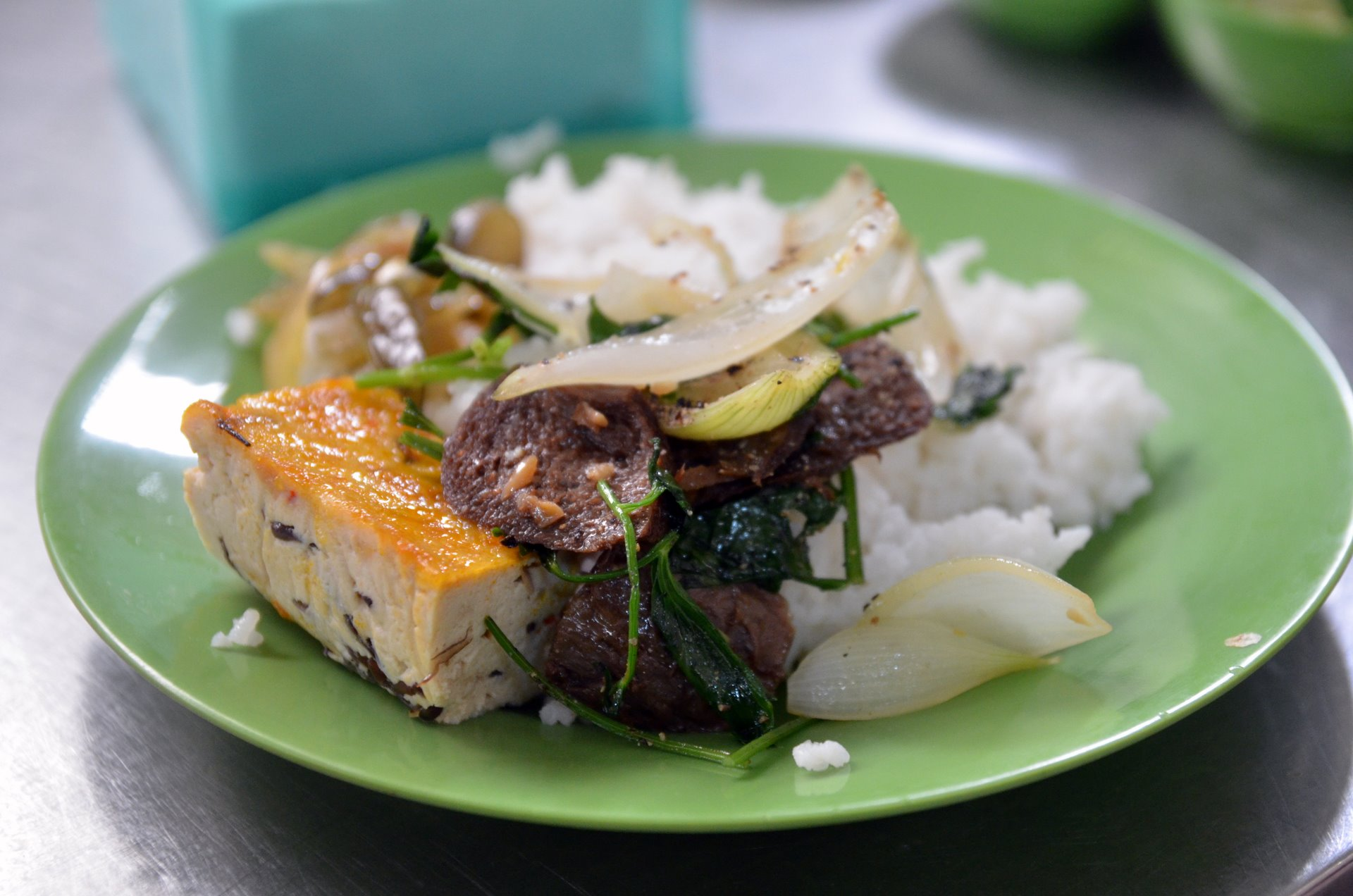
Vegetarian dishes at a Buddhist restaurant in Ho Chi Minh city

Following its dominant status in most parts of East Asia where Buddhism is most practiced, rice features heavily as a staple in the Buddhist meal, especially in the form of rice porridge or congee as the usual morning meal. Noodles and other grains may often be served as well. Vegetables of all sorts are generally either stir-fried or cooked in vegetarian broth with seasonings and may be eaten with various sauces. Onions and garlic are usually avoided as consumption of these is thought to increase undesirable emotions, such as anger or sexual desire. Traditionally, eggs are not considered vegetarian. Seasonings will be informed by whatever is common in the local region; for example, soy sauce and vegan dashi figure strongly in Japanese monastery food while Thai curry and tương (as a vegetarian replacement for fish sauce) may be prominent in Southeast Asia. Sweets and desserts are not often consumed, but are permitted in moderation and may be served at special occasions, such as in the context of a tea ceremony in the Zen tradition.

Buddhist vegetarian chefs have become extremely creative in imitating meat using prepared wheat gluten, also known as seitan, kao fu (烤麸) or wheat meat, soy (such as tofu or tempeh), agar, konnyaku and other plant products. Some of their recipes are the oldest and most-refined meat analogues in the world. Soy and wheat gluten are very versatile materials, because they can be manufactured into various shapes and textures, and they absorb flavorings (including, but not limited to, meat-like flavorings), while having very little flavor of their own. With the proper seasonings, they can mimic various kinds of meat quite closely.

Some of these Buddhist vegetarian chefs are in the many monasteries and temples which serve allium-free and mock-meat (also known as 'meat analogues') dishes to the monks and visitors (including non-Buddhists who often stay for a few hours or days, to Buddhists who are not monks, but staying overnight for anywhere up to weeks or months). Many Buddhist restaurants also serve vegetarian, vegan, non-alcoholic or allium-free dishes.

Some Buddhists eat vegetarian on the 1st and 15th of the lunar calendar (lenten days), on Chinese New Year eve, and on saint and ancestral holy days. To cater to this type of customer, as well as full-time vegetarians, the menu of a Buddhist vegetarian restaurant usually shows no difference from a typical Chinese or East Asian restaurant, except that in recipes originally made to contain meat, a soy chicken substitute might be served instead.

== Variations ==
According to cookbooks published in English, formal monastery meals in the Zen tradition generally follow a pattern of "three bowls" in descending size. The first and largest bowl is a grain-based dish such as rice, noodles or congee; the second contains the protein dish which is often some form of stew or soup; the third and smallest bowl is a vegetable dish or a salad.

== Regional ==
Regional cuisines have also contributed to the popularity of Buddhist food practices. In places like Hangzhou, China, the environment naturally supported a diet based on vegetables, tofu, fungi, grains, and freshwater fish. This clean and simple style of daily eating was practiced long before Buddhist dietary rules spread across China. As Buddhism grew, its cuisine developed alongside regional food cultures. Chinese culture has always valued food for health, medicine, and philosophy, which aligns well with Buddhist ideas about mindful eating and using food as part of spiritual practice. Local ingredients and traditional dishes shaped many of the vegetarian meals now found in temples and monastic communities.

In today's world, Buddhist cuisine in South Korea has become a way to respond to social issues while still practicing the religion. Buddhist nuns have used temple food to address problems like food insecurity, public health concerns, the loss of community, and environmental stress by giving new meaning and purpose to temple food. This helped the people around them and also supported the nuns’ own spiritual growth. The growing popularity of temple food has also promoted Korean cuisine, known as hansik, and has led to more commercialization.

== Dietary ethics and debate in global settings ==
Outside of Asia, some countries, such as the United States, use Buddhist dietary practice to reflect modern ethical concerns. There are ongoing debates among American Buddhists about whether eating meat fits with the principle of non harming. Some practitioners point to early Buddhist texts to argue that eating meat is allowed as long as the animal was not killed specifically for them as mentioned earlier. Others believe that vegetarianism or veganism aligns more closely with Buddhist ideas of compassion, animal welfare, and environmental responsibility.

In Tibet, there is tension around following Buddhist dietary practices. Being vegetarian or vegan is often seen as unrealistic there because the environment makes it hard to cultivate enough food or to rely on plant based proteins. Some Tibetan vegetarians focus on compassion for all beings and believe that rejecting meat is the right choice. Others argue that, because of the harsh conditions, they are an exception and that eating meat is acceptable since it affects their strength, health, and basic survival.

Views from Tibetan masters discourage meat eating even when it meets the “threefold purity rule.” They argue that the Buddha only allowed this rule temporarily as a way to slowly eliminate meat eating, not to justify it long term. Because of this, many Tibetan teachers do not accept meat eating today and see the rule as outdated. They also point out that factory farming, environmental destruction, and the psychological harm involved in modern meat production give even more reasons for people to reject meat. To them, avoiding meat is more consistent with the Buddha's teaching on non-harming, unless someone is in an extreme situation where they have no other choice are permitted to consume meat.

== History ==
The earliest surviving written accounts of Buddhism are the Edicts written by King Ashoka, a well-known Buddhist king who propagated Buddhism throughout Asia, and is honored by both Theravada and Mahayana schools of Buddhism. The authority of the Edicts of Ashoka as a historical record is suggested by the mention of numerous topics omitted as well as corroboration of numerous accounts found in the Theravada and Mahayana Tripitakas written down centuries later.

Asoka Rock Edict 1, dated to c. 257 BCE, mentions the prohibition of animal sacrifices in Ashoka's Maurya Empire as well as his commitment to vegetarianism; however, whether the Sangha was vegetarian in part or in whole is unclear from these edicts. However, Ashoka's personal commitment to, and advocating of, vegetarianism suggests Early Buddhism (at the very least for the layperson) most likely already had a vegetarian tradition (the details of what that entailed besides not killing animals and eating their flesh were not mentioned, and therefore are unknown).

=== Modern Vegetarian restaurants in China ===
Buddhist laypeople helped expand vegetarian restaurants in some cities in China in the early 20th century. One famous example was Gongde Lin, which opened in Shanghai, China, in 1922, and was financially backed by a group of prominent Chinese Buddhists. These restaurants not only promoted vegetarianism among laypeople, but some of them also served as meeting places for Buddhist activities.

== See also ==
- Buddha's delight – Vegetarian dish in Buddhist cuisine
- Buddhist ethics – Ethics and code of conduct in Buddhism
- Cultural elements of Buddhism – Cultural elements in Buddhism
- Index of Buddhism-related articles – Alphabetical listing of Buddhism related topics
- Kaiseki – Traditional multi-course Japanese dinner
- Korean temple cuisine – Korean Buddhist cuisine
- List of diets
- Modak – South and Southeast Asian sweet dumpling dish
- Secular Buddhism – Form of Buddhism without supernatural content
- Vegetarian cuisine – Food not including meat
- Vegetarianism and religion – Religious practices involving not eating meat
