= Seitan =

Food made from gluten, the main protein of wheat

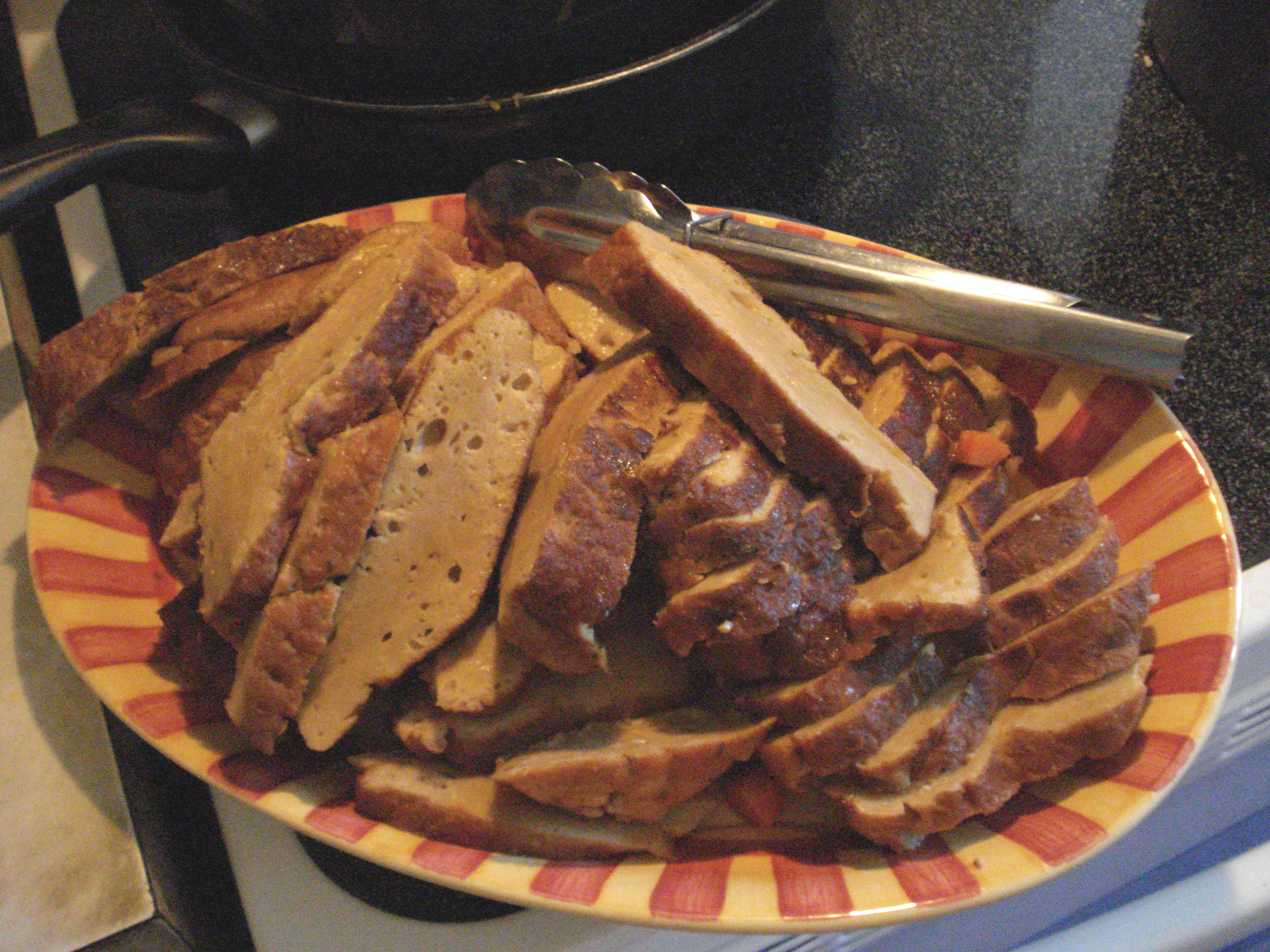
- Slices of roasted seitan
- Place of origin: China
- Associated cuisine: East Asian cuisine and Southeast Asian cuisine; Chinese; Japanese; Thai; Vietnamese
- Main ingredients: Wheat gluten

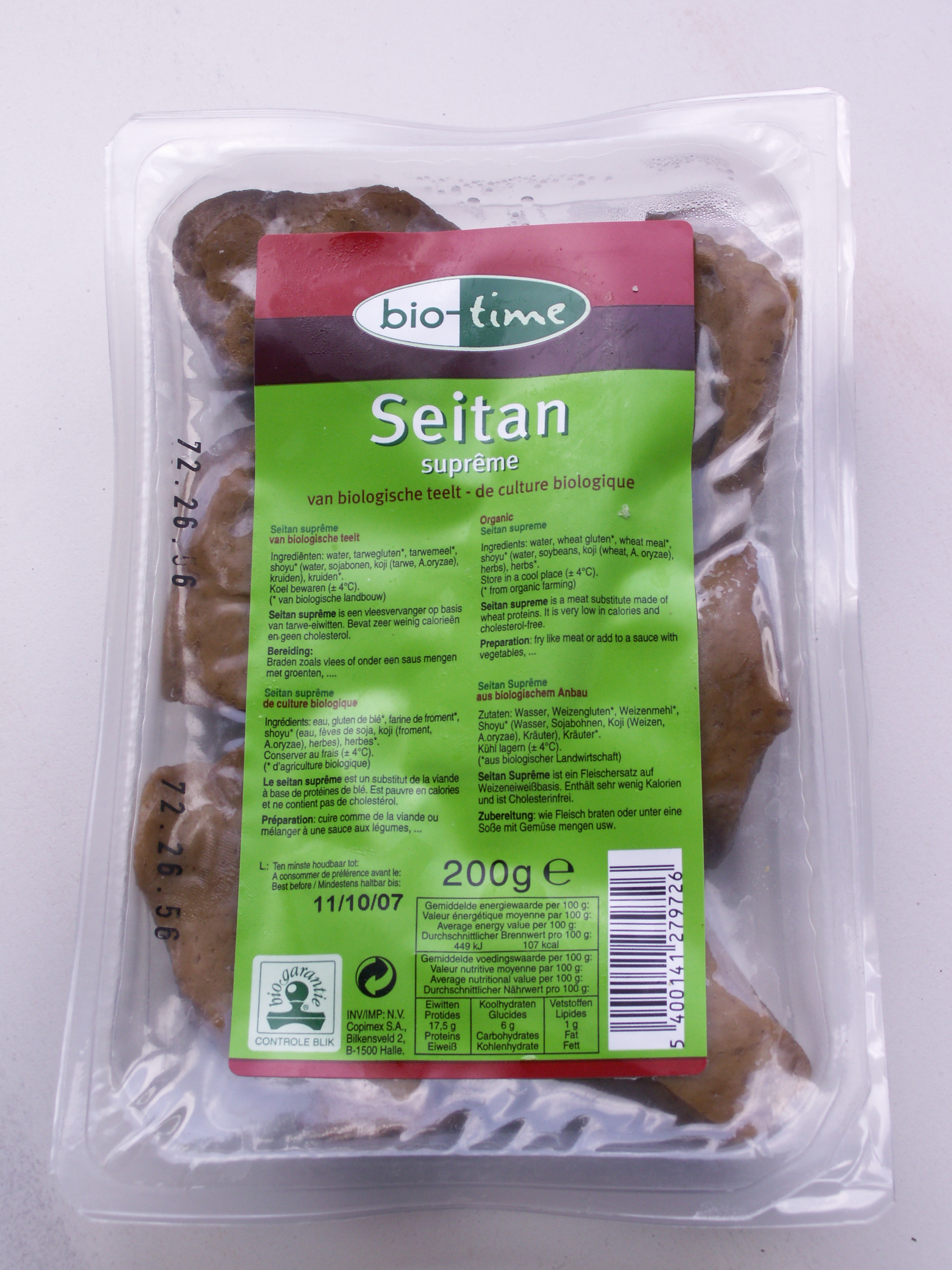
Commercially packaged seitan

Seitan (/ˈseɪtæn/ SAY-tan, US also /-tɑːn/ -tahn; Japanese: セイタン) is a food made from gluten, the main protein of wheat. It is also known as miànjīn (Chinese: 麵筋), fu (Japanese: 麩), milgogi (Korean: 밀고기), mì căn, wheat meat, gluten meat, or simply gluten.

Wheat gluten is an alternative to soybean-based foods, such as tofu, which are sometimes used as a meat alternative. Some types of wheat gluten have a chewy or stringy texture that resembles meat more than other substitutes. Wheat gluten is often used instead of meat in Asian, vegetarian, vegan, Buddhist, and macrobiotic cuisines. Mock duck is a common use.

Wheat gluten first appeared during the 6th century as an ingredient in Chinese noodles. It has historically been popular in the cuisines of China, Japan and other East and Southeast Asian nations. In Asia, it is commonly found on the menus of restaurants catering primarily to Buddhist customers who do not eat meat.

== Production ==
Gluten is traditionally extracted from wheat flour. A dough is washed in water until most of the starch granules have been removed, leaving behind the sticky, insoluble gluten as an elastic mass. This mass is cooked in a variety of ways and eaten. There are several industrial methods for separating gluten from starch.

Powdered forms of wheat gluten are also industrially produced and sold as an alternative way to make seitan. Their production involves hydrating hard wheat flour to activate the gluten, and then processing the hydrated mass to remove the starch. This leaves only the gluten, which is then dried and ground back into a powder, and can be used by consumers to make a seitan-like product.

When prepared to eat, seitan is generally marinated with a variety of ingredients.

== History ==
Called miànjīn (麵筋) meaning wheat tendon, this way of preparing wheat gluten has been documented in China since the 6th century. It is widely consumed by the Chinese as a substitute for meat, especially among monastic and lay adherents of Chinese Buddhism. The oldest reference to wheat gluten appears in the Qimin Yaoshu, a Chinese agricultural encyclopedia written by Jia Sixie in 535. The encyclopedia mentions noodles prepared from wheat gluten called bótuō (餺飥). Wheat gluten was known as miànjīn (麵筋) by the Song dynasty (960–1279).

Traditionally, food is perceived as kitchen medicine within Chinese culture. Gluten is part of traditional Chinese food therapy called shí liáo (食療), and was prescribed by traditional Chinese medicinal physicians to treat a wide range of illnesses and disease.

Wheat gluten arrived in the West by the 18th century. De Frumento, an Italian treatise on wheat written in Latin by Bartolomeo Beccari in 1728 and published in Bologna in 1745, describes the process of washing wheat flour dough to extract the gluten. John Imison wrote an English-language definition of wheat gluten in his Elements of Science and Art published in 1803. By the 1830s, Western doctors were recommending wheat gluten in diets for diabetics. In the United States, the Seventh-day Adventists promoted the consumption of wheat gluten from the late 19th century. Sanitarium Foods, a company affiliated with John Harvey Kellogg's Battle Creek Sanitarium, advertised wheat gluten in 1882.

== Etymology ==
The word seitan is of Japanese origin and was coined in 1961 by George Ohsawa, a Japanese advocate of the macrobiotic diet, having been shown it by one of his students, Kiyoshi Mokutani. In 1962, wheat gluten was sold as seitan in Japan by Marushima Shoyu K.K. It was imported to the West under that name in 1969 by the American company Erewhon. The etymology of seitan is uncertain, but it is believed to come from combining the characters 生 (sei, "fresh, raw") and 蛋 (tan, from 蛋白 (tanpaku, "protein")).

The meaning of the word "seitan" has undergone a gradual evolution. One early commercial product, imported from Japan in 1969, was a salty condiment, the color of soy sauce, sold in a small glass jar or plastic pouch, which was used as a seasoning for brown rice. The name gradually came to refer to any wheat gluten seasoned with soy sauce. The people most responsible for this change in the USA were Nik and Joanne Amartseff, who introduced Tan Pups in 1972, and John Weissman, who in 1974 introduced Wheatmeat (first meatballs then cutlets made of seitan) in Boston. All worked for years to popularize these products at the Erewhon retail store, and developed a trademark on the Wheatmeat name.

== Preparation ==
While wheat gluten itself is rather flavorless, it holds a marinade very well and is usually simmered in a dashi (broth) made from soy sauce, kombu, ginger, and sometimes also sesame oil.

=== Chinese ===
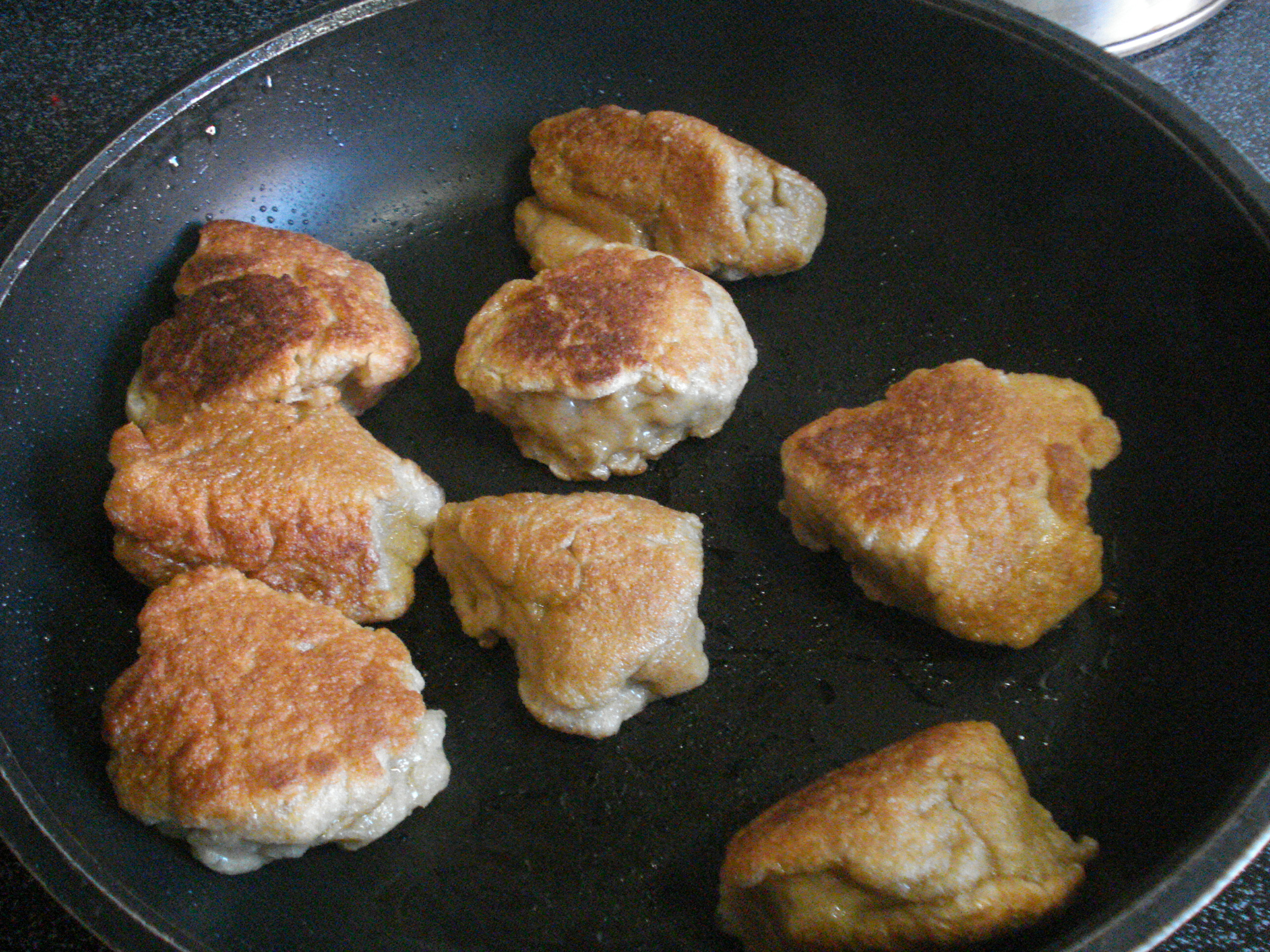
Fried seitan

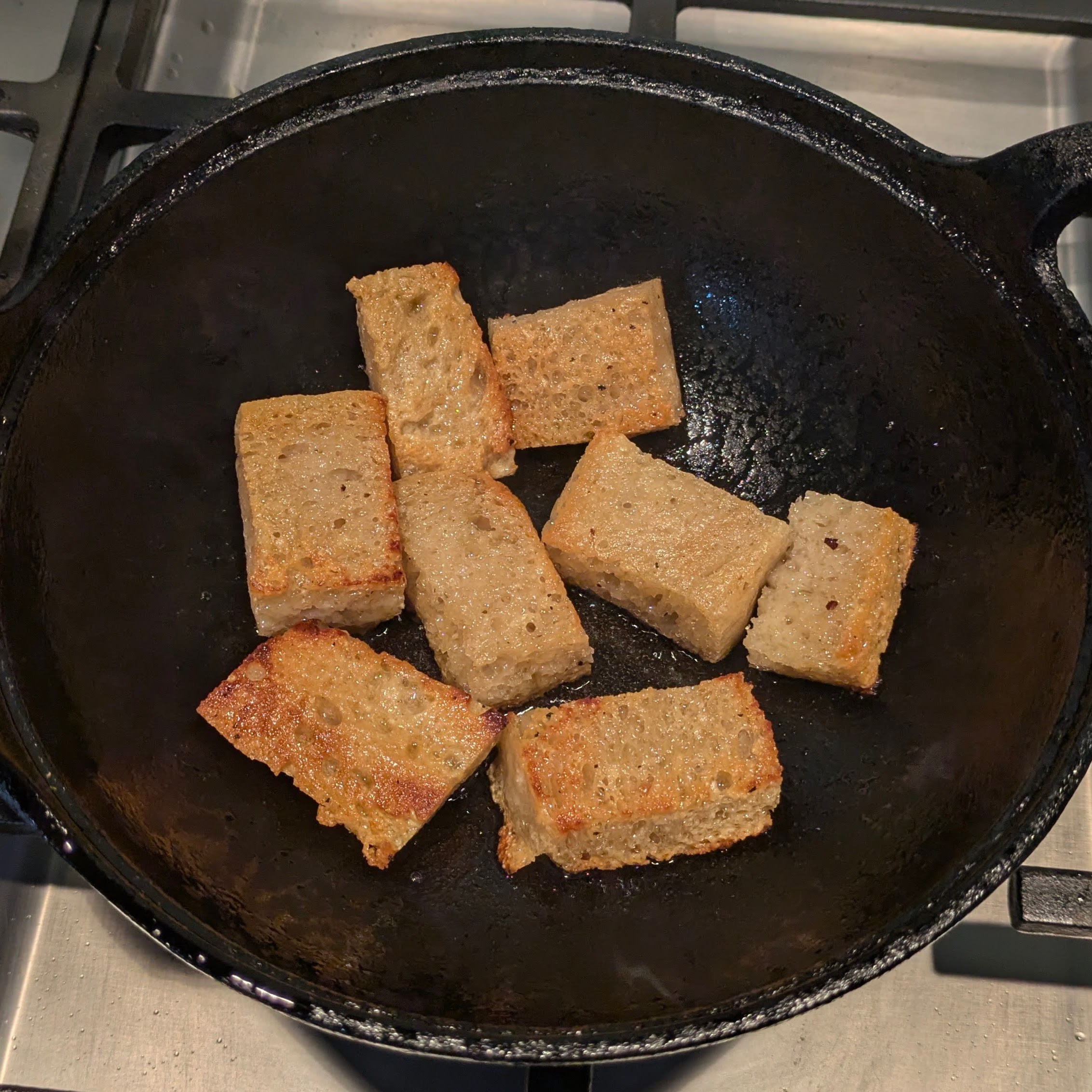
Seitan (gluten) pan-fried

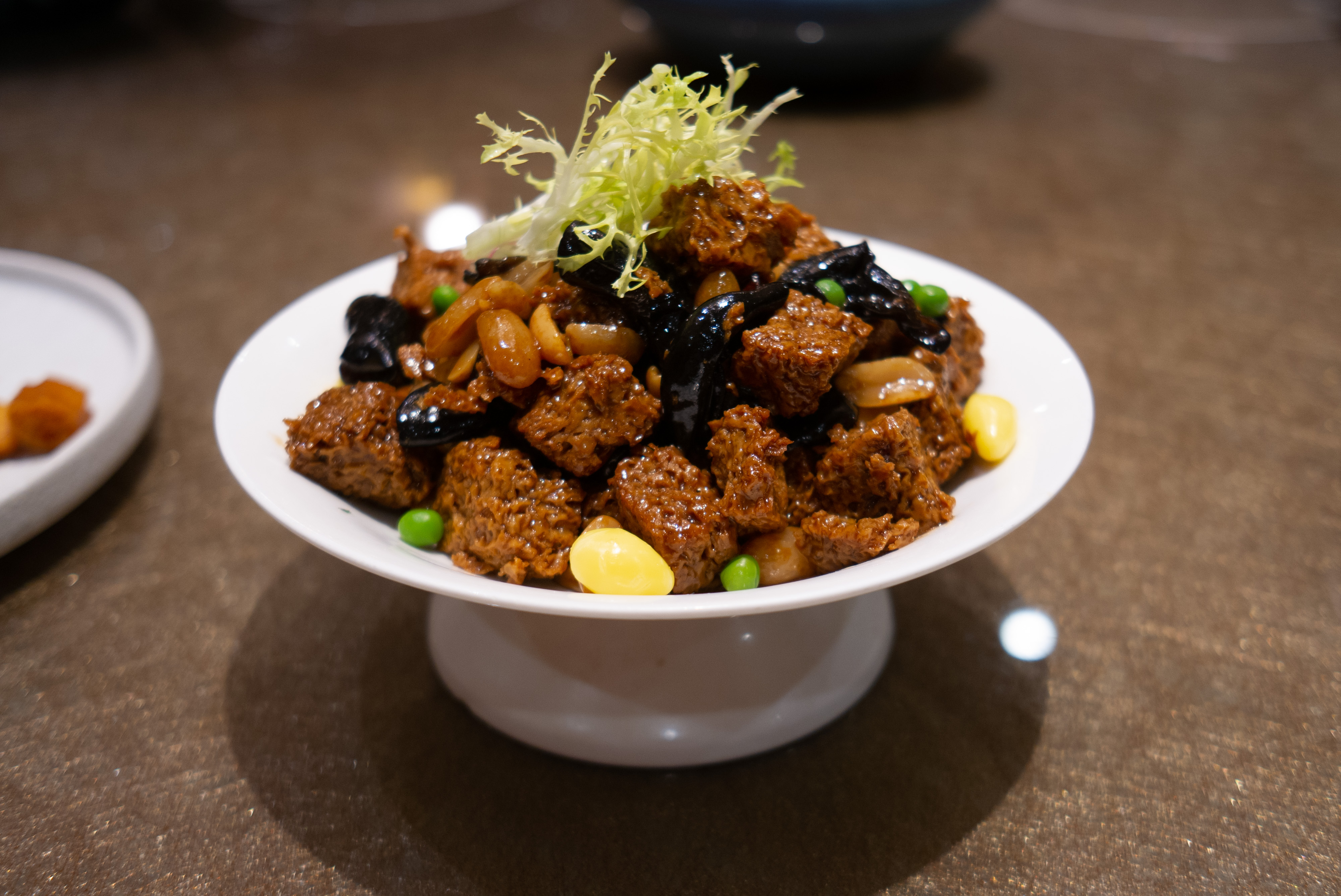
A kaofu (baked spongy gluten) dish in a restaurant in Shanghai

Wheat gluten, called miànjīn in Chinese (traditional: 麵筋, simplified: 面筋, literally "dough tendon"; also spelled mien chin in Latin script) is believed to have originated in ancient China, as a meat substitute for adherents of Buddhism, particularly some Mahayana Buddhist monks, who are strict vegetarians (see Buddhist cuisine). One story attributes the invention of imitation meat to chefs who made it for Chinese emperors who traditionally observed a week of vegetarianism each year. Miànjīn is often deep fried before being further cooked in Chinese cuisine, which confers a crispy rind that enhances the texture of the gluten. There are three primary Chinese forms of wheat gluten.

Oil-fried gluten (油麵筋, yóumiànjīn) is raw gluten that has been torn into small bits, and then deep-fried into puffy balls of 3 to 5 cm (1 to 2 in) in diameter and sold as "imitation abalone". They are golden brown, and cooked by braising or boiling in a savory soup or stew. They are frequently paired with xiānggū (black mushrooms). Larger fried balls of gluten, called miànjīnqiú (麵筋球) or miànjīnpào (麵筋泡), which may be up to 13 cm (5 in) in diameter, are sometimes seen in Asian supermarkets, often stuffed with meat or tofu mixtures and served as a dish called "gluten meatballs" (麵筋肉丸, Miànjīn roùwán) or "gluten stuffed with meat" (麵筋塞肉, miànjīn saī roù).

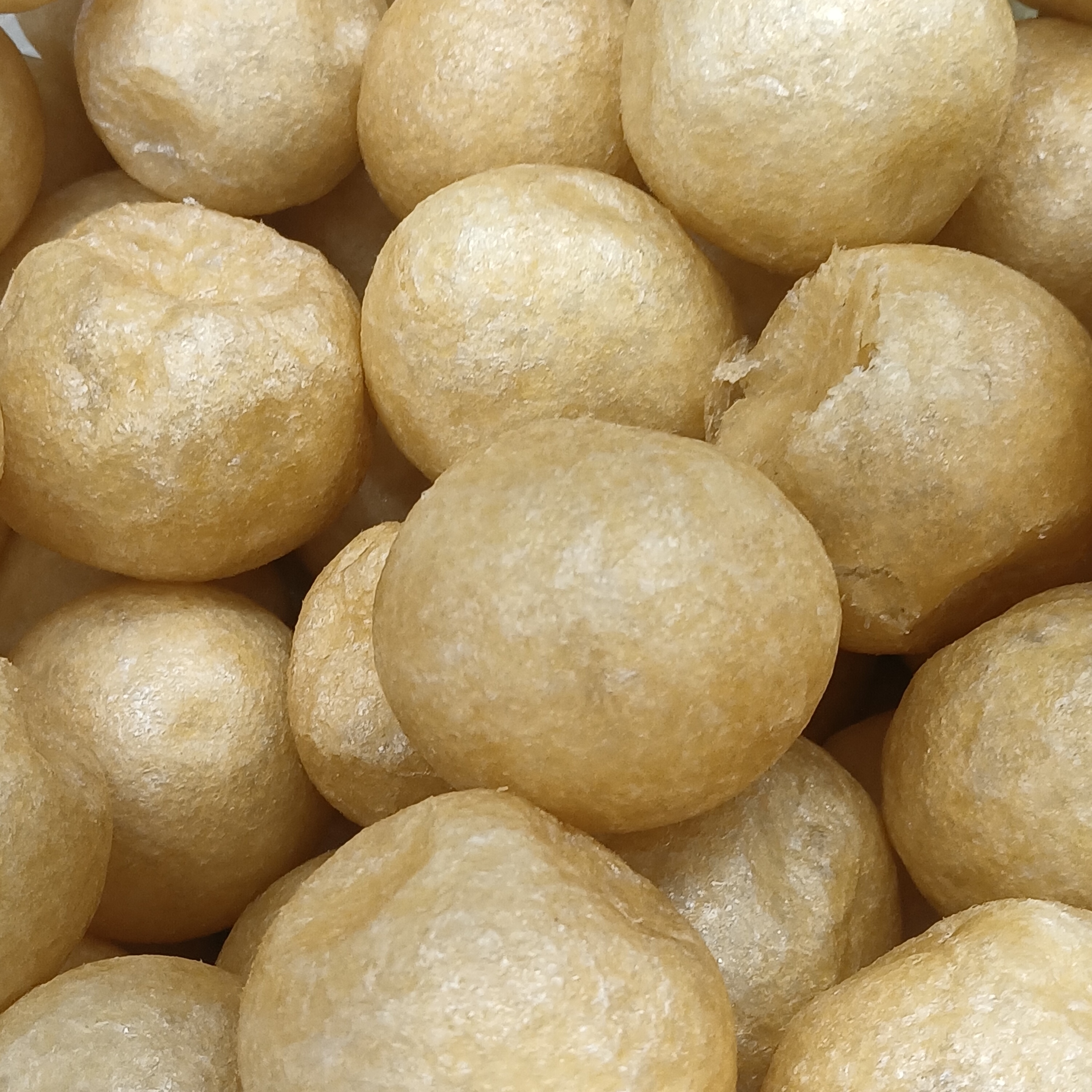
Chinese fried gluten balls

Steamed gluten (蒸麵筋, zhēngmiànjīn), is raw gluten that has been wrapped around itself to form a long sausage shape which is then steamed. This type of gluten has a dense texture and ranges from off-white to light greenish grey in color. It is torn open into strips and used as a cooking ingredient. When this sausage-shaped gluten is thickly sliced into medallions, the resulting form is called miànlún (麵輪, "gluten wheels"). Larger blocks of steamed gluten are sometimes colored pink and sold as vegetarian "mock ham." Steamed gluten is also a well-known food in Xi'an. Steamed gluten can be served with bean sprouts and cucumbers as a cold dish, or served with liángpí (凉皮).

Baked spongy gluten (烤麩; kǎofū) is similar in texture to a sponge, kaofu is made by leavening raw gluten, and then baking or steaming it. These are sold as small blocks in Chinese markets, and are diced and cooked. This type of gluten absorbs its cooking liquid like a sponge and is enjoyed for its "juicy" character. Chinese kaofu has a different texture from its Japanese counterpart, yaki-fu, due to the relatively larger air bubbles it contains. Kaofu is available fresh, frozen, dehydrated, and canned.

Miànjīn is also available in Asian grocery stores in cans and jars, often marinated in combination with peanuts or mushrooms. Such canned and jarred gluten is commonly eaten as an accompaniment to congee (boiled rice porridge) as part of a traditional Chinese breakfast. Depending on its method of preparation and ingredients used, both fresh and preserved miànjīn can be used to simulate pork, poultry, beef, or seafood.

Miànjīn can also refer to latiao, a modern Chinese snack food consisting of a strip of miànjīn (in the gluten sense), generally with a spicy and savory flavoring.

=== Japanese ===
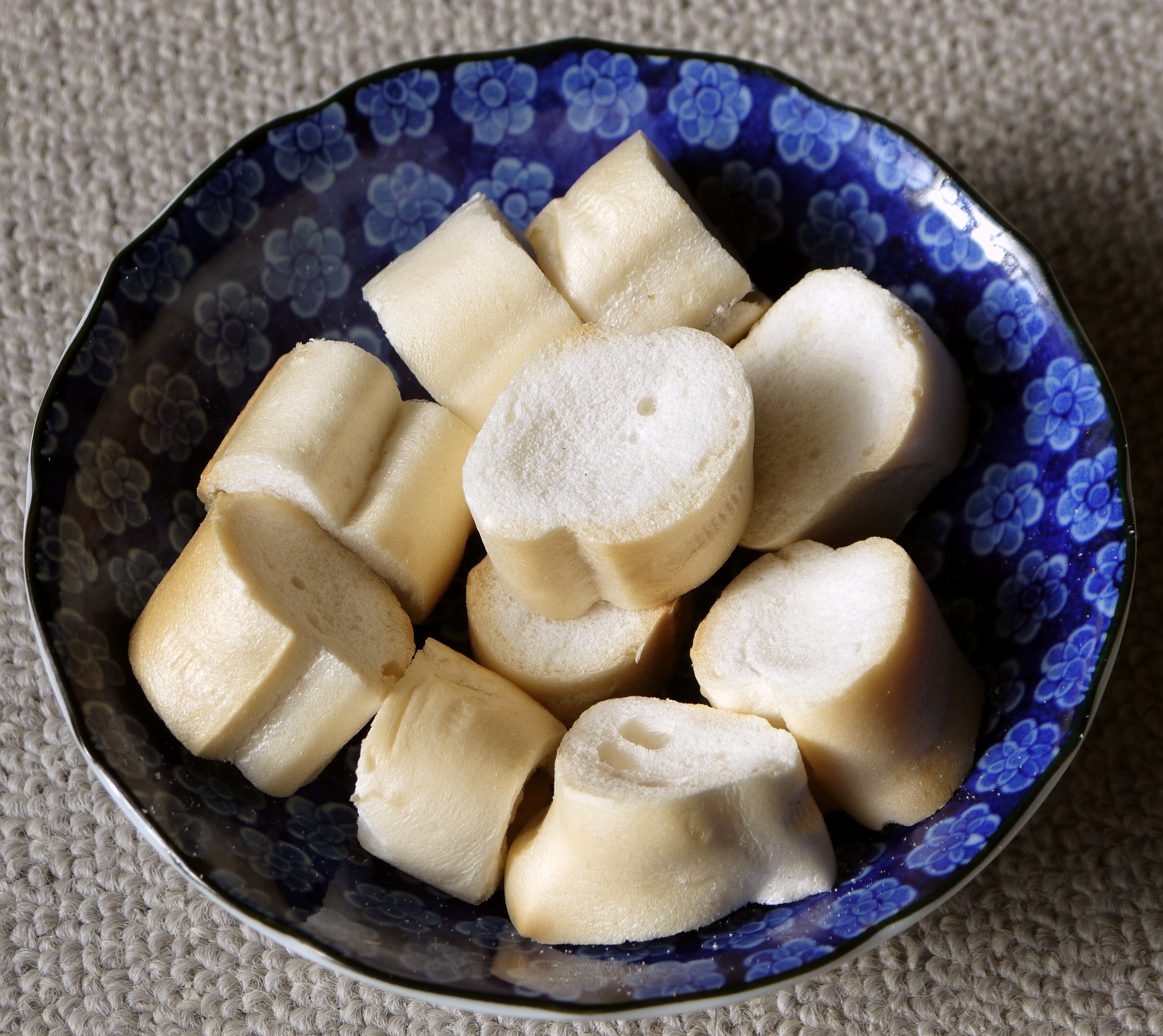
Japanese dry baked wheat gluten "Yaki-Fu" (焼き麩) looks like bread.

In Japanese cuisine, the traditional type of wheat gluten is called fu (麩, "gluten"), deriving from the Wu Chinese pronunciation of 麩, fu. In Japan, the two main types of fu are most widely used in Buddhist vegetarian cooking (Shōjin ryōri) and tea ceremony cuisine (cha-kaiseki). There are two main forms of fu, the raw nama-fu, and dry-baked yaki-fu.

Raw (nama-fu 生麩) is solid gluten which is mixed with glutinous rice flour and millet and steamed in large blocks. It may be shaped and colored in a variety of ways, using ingredients such as mugwort. Popular shapes include autumn-colored maple leaves and bunnies. Such shapes and colors enhance the attractiveness of the cooked product since steamed gluten has an unappealing grey hue. Nama-fu is an important ingredient in Shōjin-ryōri, the Buddhist vegetarian cuisine of Japan. It may also be used as an ingredient in wagashi, Japanese confectionery. Fu-manjū (麩まんじゅう) is a type of manjū made from nama-fu. Solid gluten is sweetened and filled with various sweet fillings such as red bean paste. They are then wrapped in leaves and steamed in a manner similar to that used to prepare Chinese zongzi.

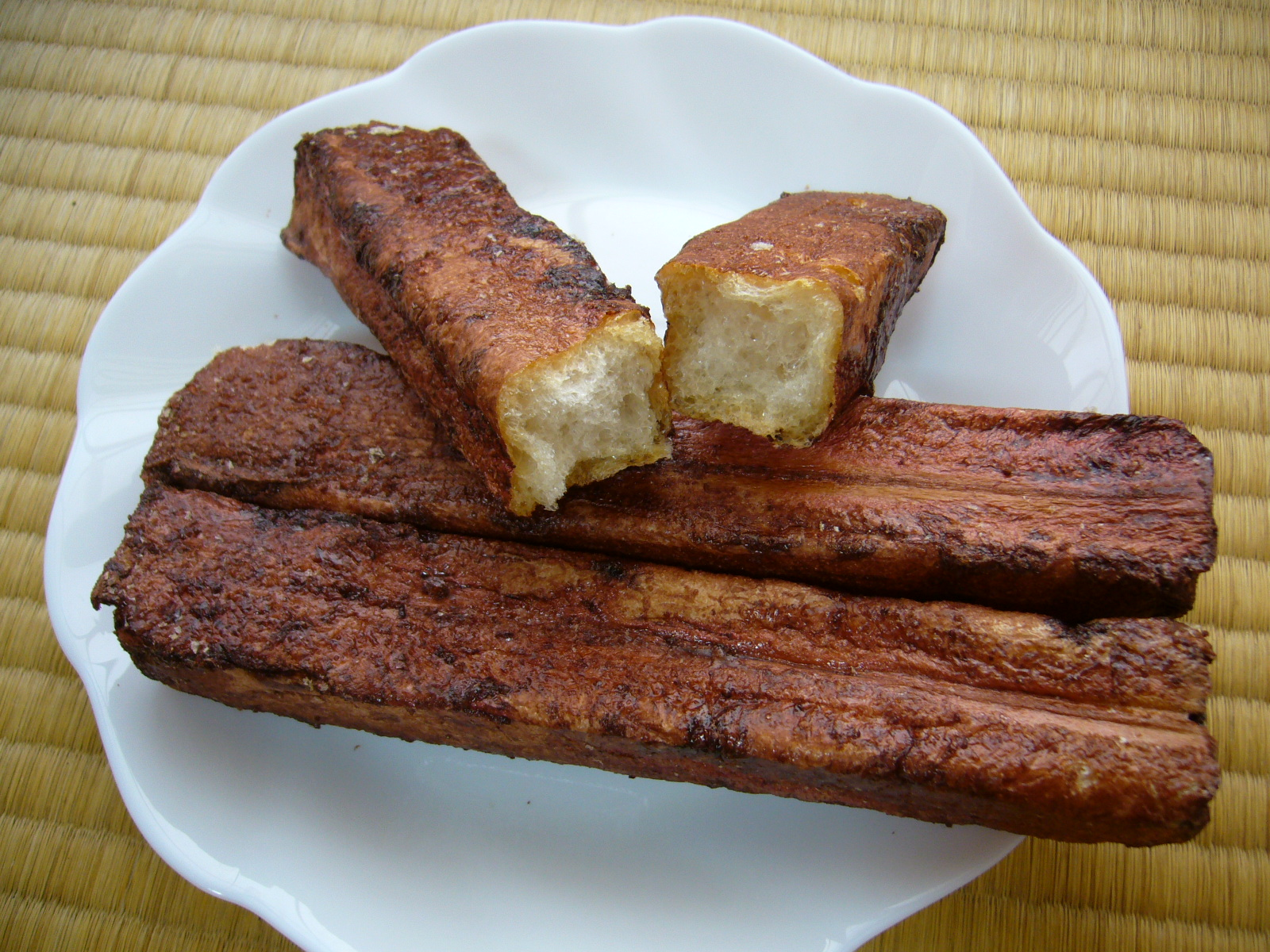
Fugashi, crisp fu confection with brown sugar

Dry baked (yaki-fu 焼き麩 or sukiyaki-fu すき焼き麩) is gluten leavened with baking powder and baked into long bread-like sticks. It is often sold in cut form, as hard dry discs resembling croutons or bread rusk. Yaki-fu is typically added to miso soup and sukiyaki, where it absorbs some of the broth and acquires a fine texture that is lighter and fluffier than its Chinese equivalent. It is the most commonly available type of fu in Japanese supermarkets.

In Japan, seitan, initially a rather salty macrobiotic seasoning that gradually evolved into a food, is not well known or widely available, despite the macrobiotic diet's Japanese origins. When used, the terms for this food are rendered in katakana as グルテンミート (Romanized "gurutenmīto", from the English "gluten meat"), or, rarely, セイタン ("seitan"). Outside macrobiotic circles, these terms are virtually unknown in Japan, and they do not typically appear in Japanese dictionaries.

Along with tofu and abura-age, fu can be used as a substitute for meat in Japanese cuisine.

=== Vietnamese ===
In Vietnam, wheat gluten is called mì căn or mì căng, and is prepared in a similar fashion to Chinese miàn jīn. Along with tofu, it is a part of the Buddhist cuisine of Vietnam.

=== Western ===
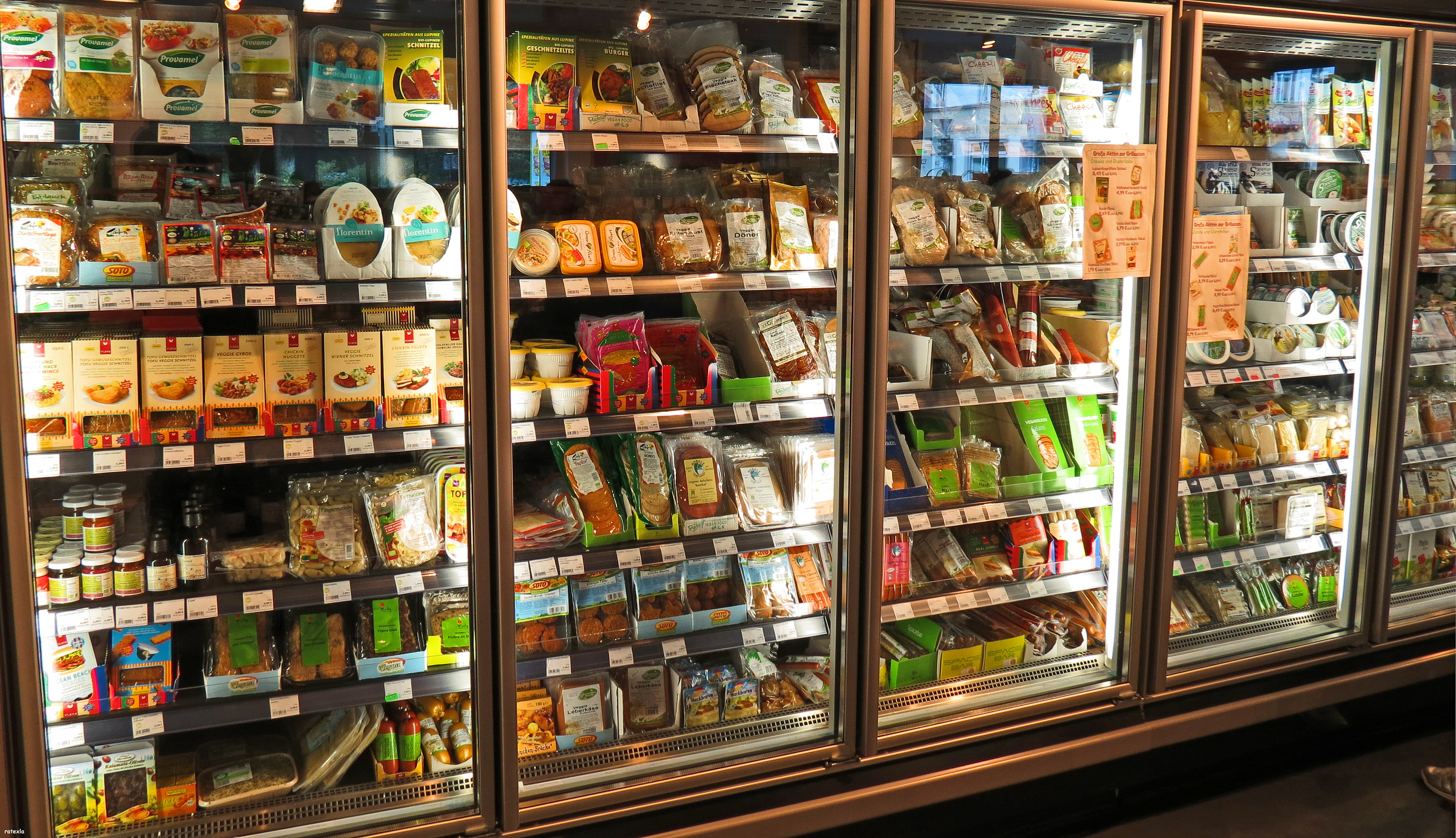
A wide range of mock-meat products, based on wheat gluten or tofu, are sold at stores in Germany and in other European countries.

Since the mid-20th century, wheat gluten (usually called seitan) has been increasingly adopted by vegetarians in Western nations as a meat alternative. It is sold in block, strip and shaped forms in North America, where it can be found in some supermarkets, Asian food markets, health food stores and cooperatives.

The block form of seitan is often flavored with shiitake or portobello mushrooms, fresh coriander or onion, or barbecue sauce, or packed in a vegetable-based broth. In strip form, it can be packed to be eaten right out of the package as a high-protein snack. Shaped seitan products, in the form of "ribs" and patties, are frequently flavored with barbecue, teriyaki, or other savory sauces.

In North America, several brand-name meat alternatives are used in the restaurant and food service markets.

Wheat gluten is also used in many vegetarian products in various countries, for example by The African Hebrew Israelites of Jerusalem, a Black vegan religious sect in Israel that operates a chain of restaurants to produce vegetarian sandwiches.

== See also ==
- List of meat substitutes
- Textured vegetable protein
- Vegan cuisine
