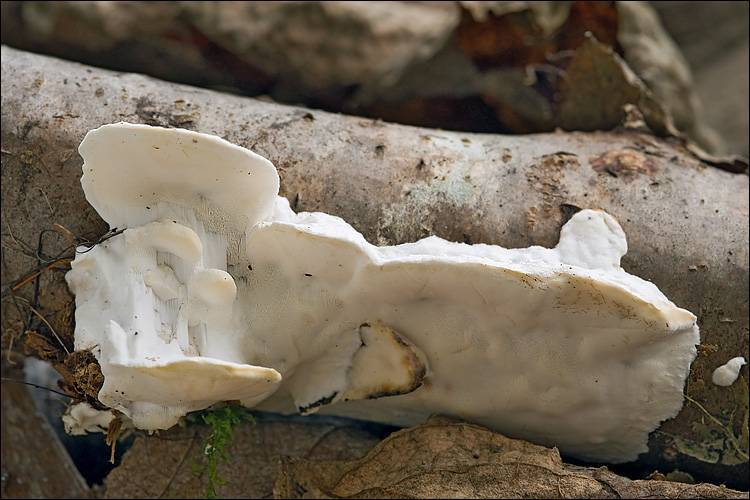
- Skeletocutis nivea on dead branch of common hazel; Slovenia

Scientific classification
- Kingdom: Fungi
- Division: Basidiomycota
- Class: Agaricomycetes
- Order: Polyporales
- Family: Incrustoporiaceae
- Genus: Skeletocutis; Kotl. & Pouzar (1958)

Type species
- Skeletocutis amorpha (Fr.) Kotl. & Pouzar (1958)

Synonyms
- Incrustoporia Domański (1963); Leptotrimitus Pouzar (1966)

= Skeletocutis =

Genus of fungi

Skeletocutis is a genus of about 40 species of poroid fungi in the family Polyporaceae. The genus has a cosmopolitan distribution, although most species are found in the Northern Hemisphere. It causes a white rot in a diverse array of woody substrates, and the fruit bodies grow as a crust on the surface of the decaying wood. Sometimes the edges of the crust are turned outward to form rudimentary bracket-like caps.

Skeletocutis is primarily distinguished from similar genera of wood-rotting fungi by microscopic features, especially by the sausage-shaped to ellipsoid spores, and spiny crystals covering certain hyphae in the pore tissue. The genus was circumscribed by Czech mycologists František Kotlaba and Zdenek Pouzar in 1958, with Skeletocutis amorpha as the type species.

== Description ==
=== Macroscopic characteristics ===
The fruit bodies of Skeletocutis are annual to perennial. They are resupinate (crust-like) to pileate (that is, with a cap). When caps are present, their colour is typically white, cream-pink, or lilac, although the fruit body tends to discolour somewhat when dry. The pores are small and round to irregular in shape. Many Skeletocutis species have a zone of dense cartilaginous tissue above the tube layer; this zone has a gelatinous texture when fresh.

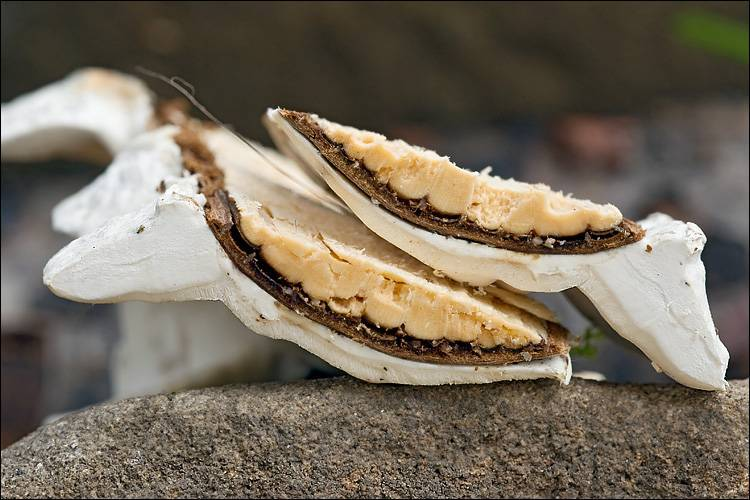
Bisected fruit body of S. nivea

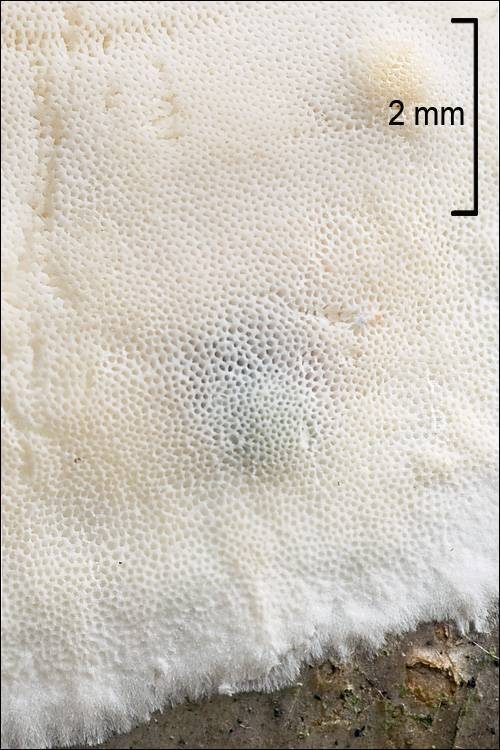
Pores of S. nivea

=== Microscopic characteristics ===
The hyphal system is dimitic or trimitic. The generative hyphae have clamps, and are often encrusted with spiny crystals, particularly in the dissepiments (tissue that is found between the pores). The skeletal hyphae are hyaline (translucent). Although typically only the generative hyphae of Skeletocutis fungi have incrustations, three species are reported to have apical incrustations on the skeletal hyphae: S. alutacea and S. percandida, and S. novae-zelandiae. Ţura and colleagues suggest that the "taxonomy of these species is poorly worked-out."

Cystidia are absent in the hymenium, but cystidioles are present in most species. The spores are smooth, hyaline, and have an allantoid (sausage-like) to cylindric to ellipsoid shape. They do not have reaction with Melzer's reagent. The basidia (spore-bearing cells) are club shaped to barrel shaped and four spored, measuring 8–15 by 4–5 μm. Although the majority of Skeletocutis species have thin-walled spores, six species have spores with thick walls: S. alutacea, S. bambusicola, S. borealis, S. krawtzewii, S. percandida, and S. perennis.

== Ecology, habitat, and distribution ==
Skeletocutis causes a white rot in a diverse array of woody substrates. Although the majority of species are found growing on the dead wood of various conifer and hardwood genera, some are known to grow on the dead fruit bodies of other polypores. For example, S. brevispora feeds on Phellinidium ferrugineofuscum, while S. chrysella eats Phellinus chrysoloma. The tropical Chinese species S. bambusicola grows on dead bamboo. S. percandida has been reported growing on exotic bamboos cultivated in France. In the Daxing'anling forest areas of northeastern China, S. ochroalba has been found growing on charred wood after forest fires, and may be a pioneer species for this substrate.

In the southern part of the Russian Far East, S. odora is common in aspen forests. It is often found fruiting in association with other fungi, including Fomitopsis rosea, Crustoderma dryinum, Leptoporus mollis, and Phlebia centrifuga. S. odora favours large logs more than 30–50 cm (12–20 in) in diameter. This species is part of the community of fungal successors of decaying wood. A Finnish study found that it fruited most frequently in the third stage (medium decay) of wood decomposition of Norway spruce (Picea abies). In this stage, which occurs about 20–40 years after the death of the plant, the decay penetrates more than 3 cm (1.2 in) into the wood, while the core is still hard. S. carneogrisea and S. kuehneri are successor species that grow on the dead fruit bodies of the polypores Trichaptum abietinum and T. fuscoviolaceum.

Skeletocutis has a cosmopolitan distribution, although most species are found in the Northern Hemisphere. Leif Ryvarden considered 22 species to occur in Europe in his 2014 work Poroid Fungi of Europe. Viacheslav Spirin reported 13 species in Russia in 2005. Twenty-two species have been recorded in China.

== Conservation ==
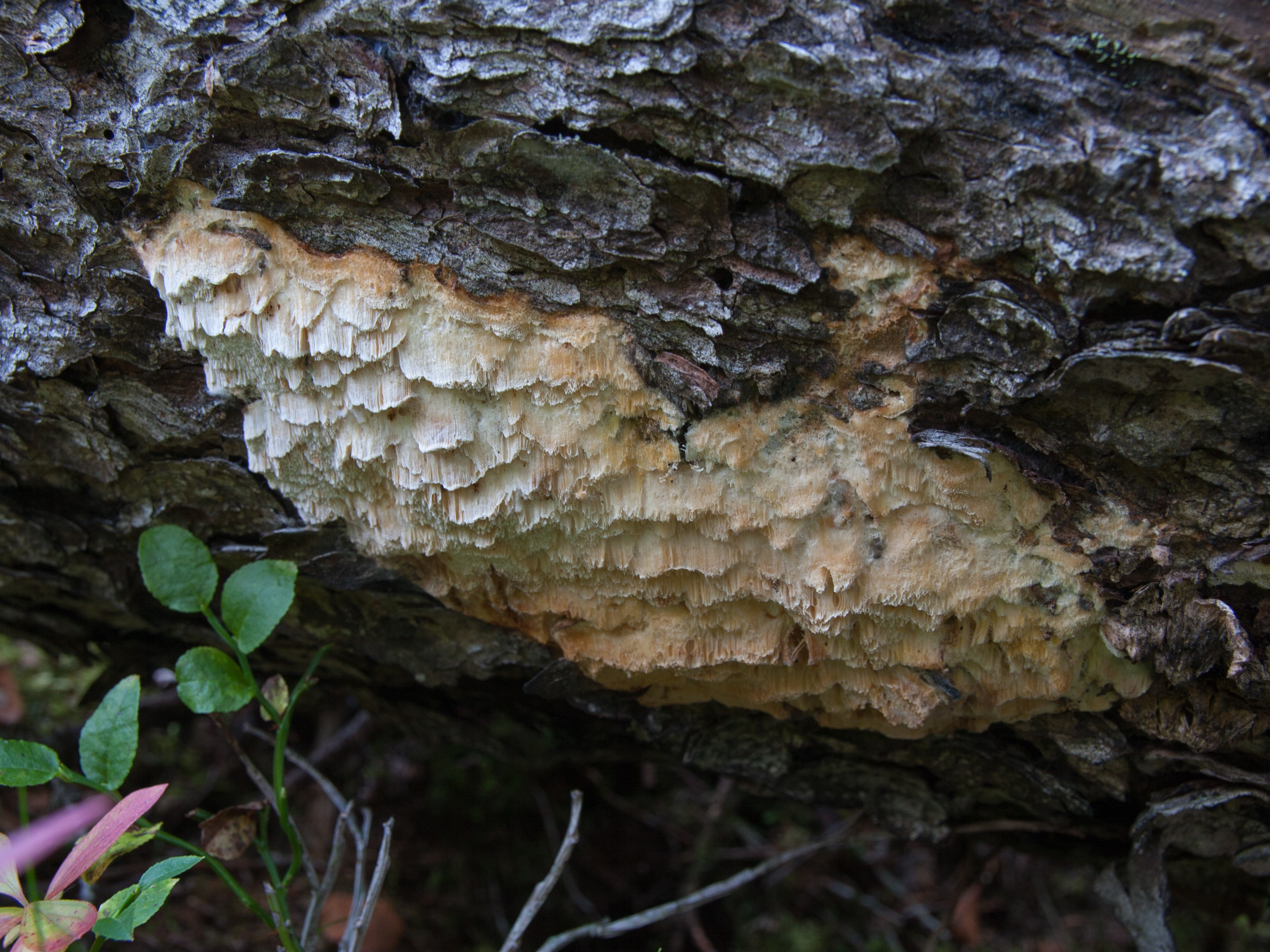
S. odora is used as an indicator species in Estonia

In Europe, Skeletocutis odora appears on the national Red Lists of threatened fungi in 5 countries and is one of 33 species of fungi proposed for international conservation under the Bern Convention. Its natural habitat is threatened by deforestation and loss of thick fallen logs typical of old-growth forests. In Estonia, S. odora and S. stellae are used as indicator species to help assess whether forest stands should be protected. They are associated with old-growth forest areas that have been minimally impacted by humans. In contrast, S. lilacina is found exclusively in selectively logged forests, while S. stellae inhabits both types of forest. The Argentinian species S. nothofagi, known only from Tierra del Fuego, has been proposed for inclusion in the IUCN Red List of Threatened Species due to its highly restricted distribution and rare occurrence.

== Taxonomy ==
The genus was circumscribed by Czech mycologists František Kotlába and Zdeněk Pouzar in 1958 with Skeletocutis amorpha (originally described as Polyporus amorphus by Elias Magnus Fries in 1815) as the type and only species. The generic name Skeletocutis is derived from the Ancient Greek word σκελετός (skeleto, "dried up") and the Latin word cutis ("skin").

Other genera that feature encrustations in the hyphae of the dissepiment edges include Tyromyces and Piloporia. Molecular analyses has shown the close phylogenetic relationship between Skeletocutis and Tyromyces. These two genera group together in the tyromyces clade, on a branch lying outside of the core polyporoid clade, or in the "residual polypore clade" of Tomšovský and colleagues.

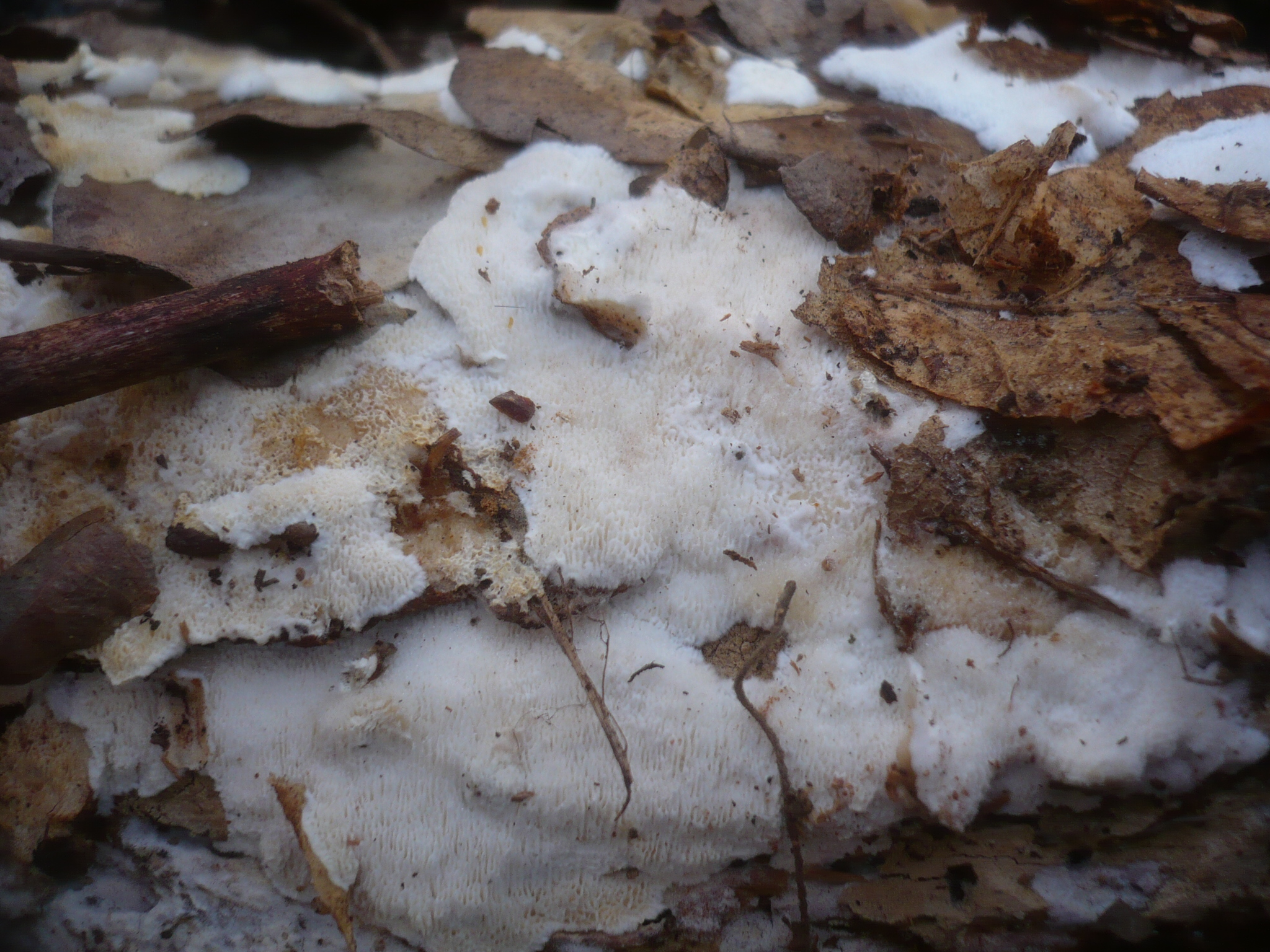
Sidera lenis was formerly placed in Skeletocutis.

Two species formerly placed in Skeletocutis, S. lenis (P.Karst.) Niemelä and S. vulgaris (Fr.) Niemelä & Y.C.Dai, were transferred to the new genus Sidera based on molecular analysis. Although Sidera is placed in a different order (Hymenochaetales), it shares many characteristic features with Skeletocutis, including whitish resupinate basidiocarps (in many species) with small pores, and narrow skeletal hyphae. In contrast with Skeletocutis, however, the hyphae in Sidera comprising the dissepiment edge are smooth or covered with only a few faceted crystal clusters.

In 1963, Polish mycologist Stanislaw Domanski circumscribed the genus Incrustoporia (typified by Poria stellae) to contain several polypores featuring encrusted hyphae at the dissepiments. In 1969, John Ericksson and Åke Strid added Polyporus semipileatus Peck to the genus. The taxonomic placement of this fungus had long before confused mycologists, who had given it a variety of scientific names. Three years before, Pouzar created the genus Leptotrimitus to contain this fungus, as he was not satisfied with other possible generic placements. The main distinguishing feature of Leptotrimitus was the presence of trimitic hyphae. In 1971, Marinus Anton Donk reunited Incrustoporia and Leptotrimitus, as he did not believe that the trimitic character alone was a sufficient criterion for delineating a new genus when so many other characters were identical. Jean Keller studied the ultrastructure of the encrusted hyphae of Incrustoporia species using electron microscopy. He determined that, with the exception of I. carneola, the crystallizations were similar in all instances. The crystals of I. carneola were in the shape of small regular parallelepipeds—clearly distinct from the spiny crystal structures characteristic of the rest of Incrustoporia. Because Skeletocutis was published earlier, it had priority over the generic name Incrustoporia, and so Keller transferred the remaining six species to Skeletocutis in 1989: S. alutacea, S. nivea, S. percandida, S. stellae, S. subincarnata, and S. tschulymica. Incrustoporia carneola was transferred to Junghuhnia as J. carneola.

The inclusion of several monomitic species by Alix David in 1982 (S. azorica, S. jelicii, S. portcrosensis and S. subsphaerospora) was controversial, as mycologists Leif Ryvarden and Robert Lee Gilbertson (1993, 1994) and Annarosa Bernicchia (2005) transferred them to or accepted them in Ceriporiopsis. Later molecular work demonstrated that two of these monomitic species, S. azorica and S. subsphaerospora, are phylogenetically much closer to the Skeletocutis-Tyromyces sensu stricto group of species than to Ceriporiopsis, and the current concept of Skeletocutis includes monomitic species. S. jelicii and S. portcrosensis remain in Ceriporiopsis.

== Species ==
A 2008 estimate placed around 30 species in the widely distributed genus. As of September 2016, the nomenclatural database Index Fungorum accepts 41 species.

- Skeletocutis africana Ryvarden & P.Roberts (2006) – Cameroon
- Skeletocutis albocremea A.David (1982) – Russia
- Skeletocutis alutacea (J.Lowe) Jean Keller (1979) – United States, Europe
- Skeletocutis amorpha (Fr.) Kotl. & Pouzar (1958) – China; Europe; Africa; Australia

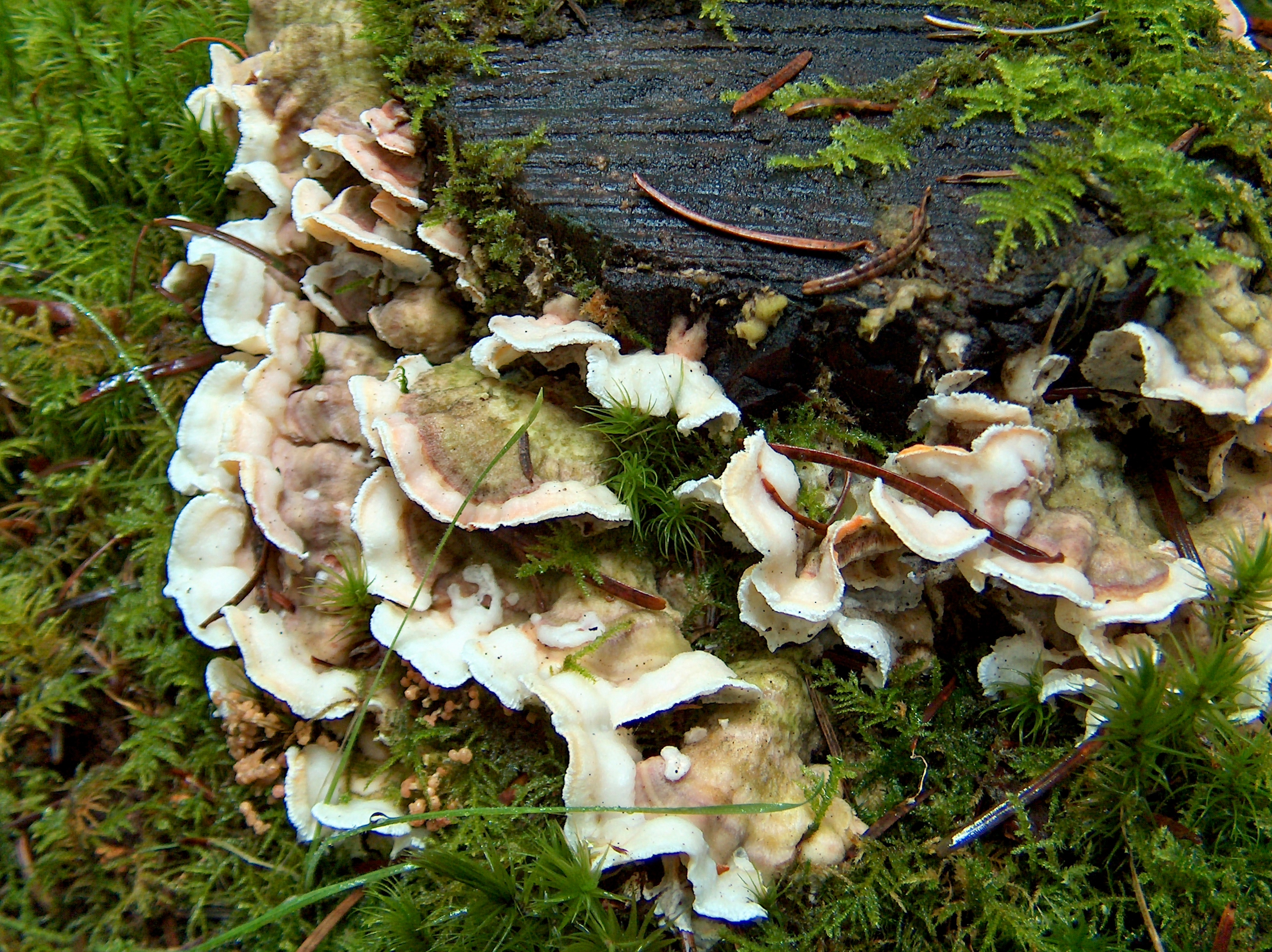
S. amorpha on pine stump, United States

- Skeletocutis azorica (D.A.Reid) Jülich (1982) – Portugal
- Skeletocutis bambusicola L.W.Zhou & W.M.Qin (2012) – China
- Skeletocutis bicolor (Lloyd) Ryvarden (1992) – Singapore
- Skeletocutis biguttulata (Romell) Niemelä (1998) – Russia
- Skeletocutis borealis Niemelä (1998) – Europe
- Skeletocutis brevispora Niemelä (1998) – China; Europe
- Skeletocutis brunneomarginata Ryvarden (2009) – United States
- Skeletocutis carneogrisea A.David (1982) – China; Europe; South America

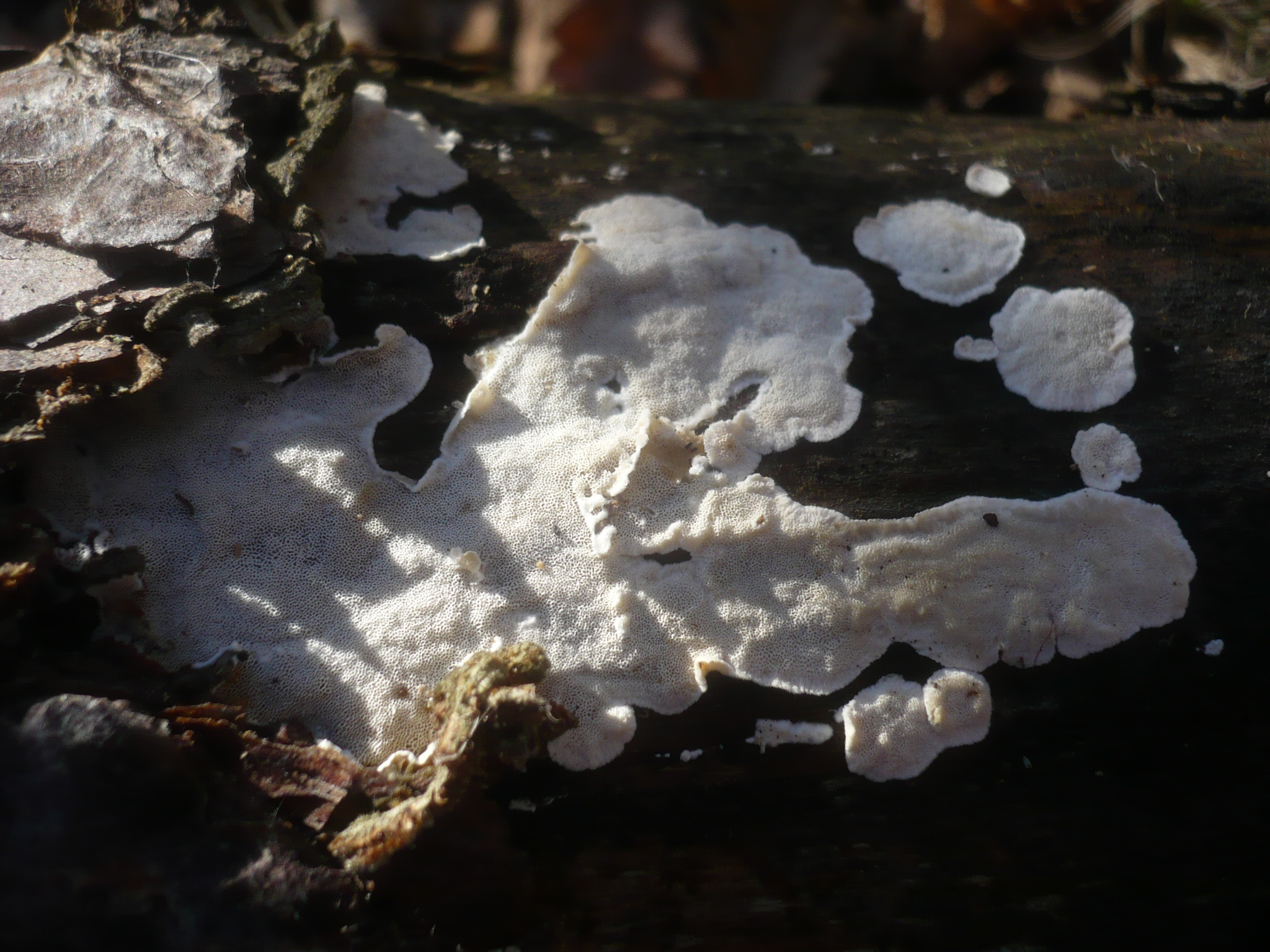
S. carneogrisea on Scots pine, Austria

- Skeletocutis chrysella Niemelä (1998) – Europe
- Skeletocutis diluta (Rajchenb.) A.David & Rajchenb. (1992) – pantropical
- Skeletocutis falsipileata (Corner) T.Hatt. (2002) – Asia
- Skeletocutis fimbriata Juan Li & Y.C.Dai (2008) – China
- Skeletocutis friata Niemelä & Saaren. (2001) – Europe
- Skeletocutis inflata B.K.Cui (2013) – southern China
- Skeletocutis krawtzewii (Pilát) Kotl. & Pouzar (1991) – China; Siberia
- Skeletocutis kuehneri A.David (1982) – Great Britain; Netherlands; Russia

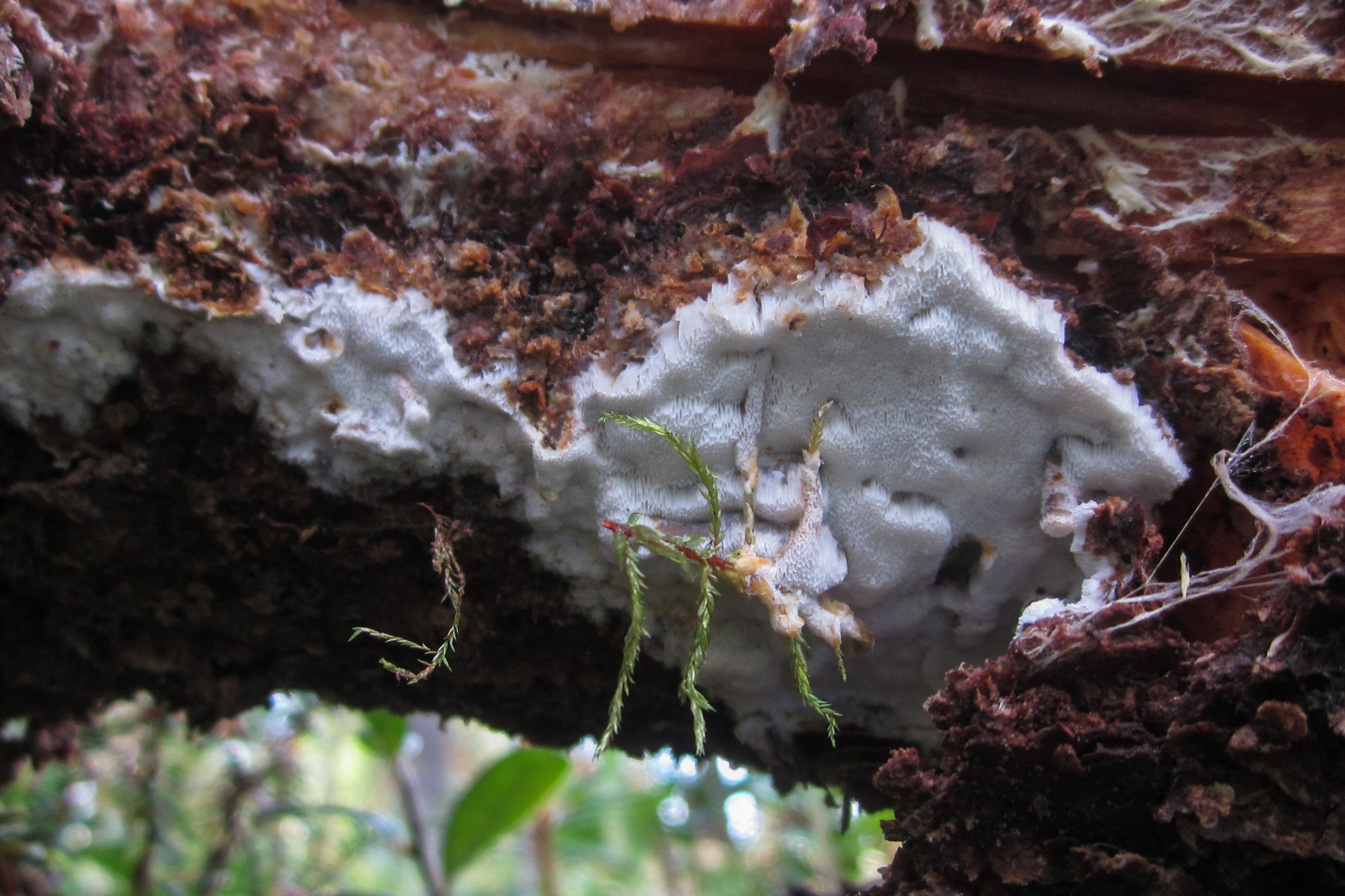
S. kuehneri

- Skeletocutis lilacina A.David & Jean Keller (1984) – China; Europe; North America
- Skeletocutis luteolus B.K.Cui & Y.C.Dai (2008) – China
- Skeletocutis microcarpa Ryvarden & Iturr. (2003) – Venezuela
- Skeletocutis mopanshanensis (2017) – China
- Skeletocutis nivea (Jungh.) Jean Keller (1979) – Africa, Europe, Australia, New Zealand; China South America
- Skeletocutis niveicolor (Murrill) Ryvarden (1985) – North America
- Skeletocutis nothofagi Rajchenb. (1979) – Argentina
- Skeletocutis novae-zelandiae (G.Cunn.) P.K.Buchanan & Ryvarden (1988) – New Zealand
- Skeletocutis ochroalba Niemelä (1985) – Canada; China; Central and Northern Europe
- Skeletocutis odora (Sacc.) Ginns (1984) – Slovakia; Russia
- Skeletocutis papyracea A.David (1982) – Europe
- Skeletocutis percandida (Malençon & Bertault) Jean Keller (1979) – Africa (Zimbabwe); Asia (China; Israel); Mediterranean Europe
- Skeletocutis perennis Ryvarden (1986) – China
- Skeletocutis polyporicola Ryvarden & Iturr. (2011) – Venezuela
- Skeletocutis pseudo-odora L.F.Fan & Jing Si (2017) – China
- Skeletocutis roseola (Rick ex Theiss.) Rajchenb. (1987) – Brazil
- Skeletocutis stellae (Pilát) Jean Keller (1979) – China; Argentina; Europe

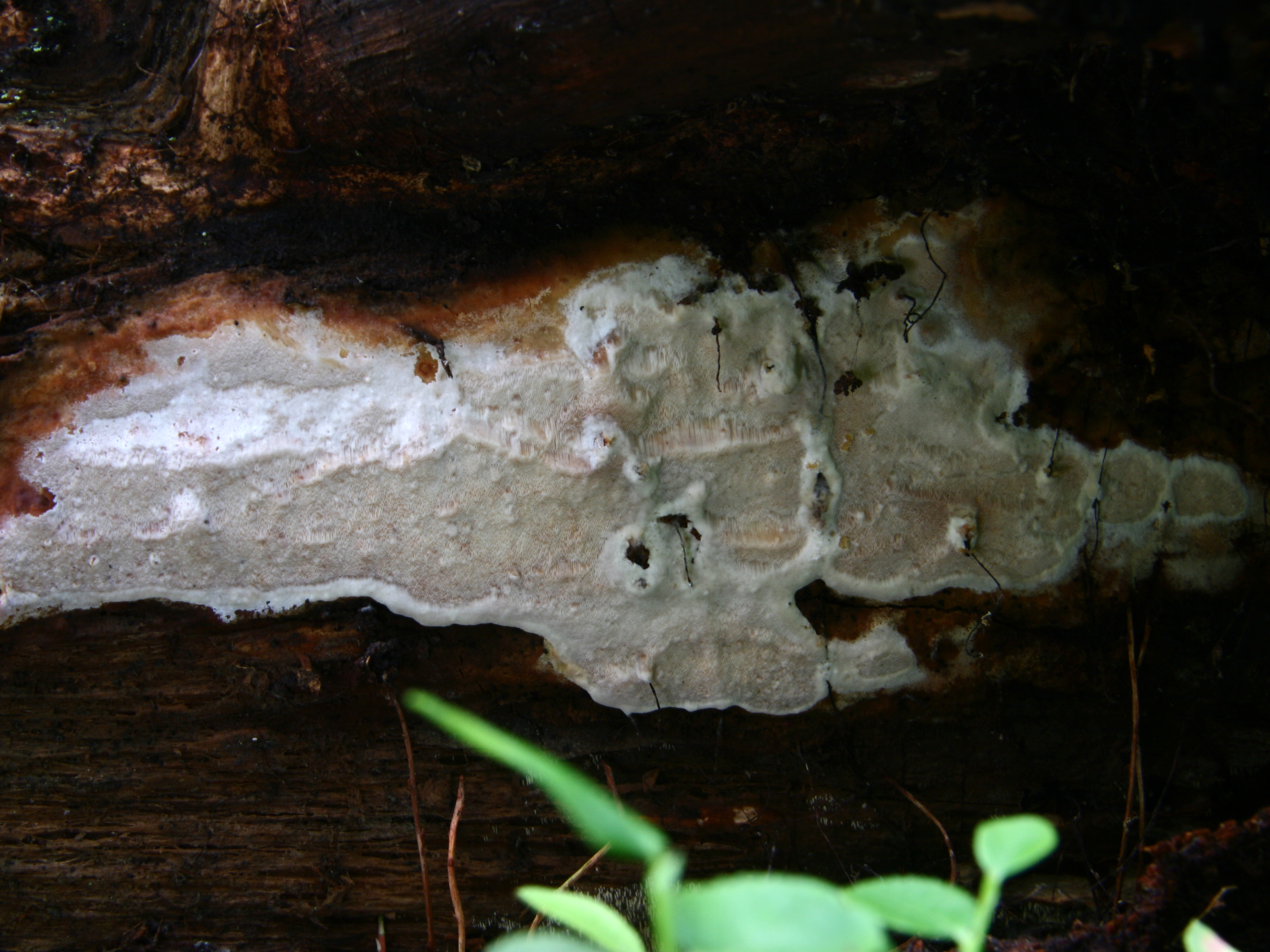
S. stellae on conifer log, Czech Republic

- Skeletocutis stramentica (G.Cunn.) Rajchenb. (1995) – New Zealand
- Skeletocutis subincarnata (Peck) Jean Keller (1979) – Europe; Canada
- Skeletocutis subodora Vlasák & Ryvarden (2012) – United States
- Skeletocutis substellae Y.C.Dai (2011) – China
- Skeletocutis subvulgaris Y.C.Dai (1998) – China
- Skeletocutis tschulymica (Pilát) Jean Keller (1979) – Europe
- Skeletocutis uralensis (Pilát) Kotl. & Pouzar (1990) – Europe
- Skeletocutis yunnanensis – China

The taxon S. australis, described from South America by Mario Rajchenberg in 1987, was later placed by him in synonymy with the species S. stramentica, originally described from New Zealand.

Index Fungorum shows 66 taxa associated with the generic name Skeletocutis. Several species once placed in this genus have since been moved to other genera:

- Skeletocutis basifusca (Corner) T.Hatt. (2001) = Trichaptum basifuscum Corner (1987)
- Skeletocutis hymeniicola (Murrill) Niemelä (1998) = Poria hymeniicola Murrill (1920)
- Skeletocutis jelicii Tortič & A.David (1981) = Ceriporiopsis jelicii (Tortič & A.David) Ryvarden & Gilb. (1993)
- Skeletocutis portcrosensis A.David (1982) = Ceriporiopsis portcrosensis (A.David) Ryvarden & Gilb. (1993)
- Skeletocutis sensitiva (Lloyd) Ryvarden (1992) = Fomitopsis sensitiva (Lloyd) R.Sasaki (1954)
