= Skeletocutis africana =

Scientific classification
- Domain: Eukaryota
- Kingdom: Fungi
- Division: Basidiomycota
- Class: Agaricomycetes
- Order: Polyporales
- Family: Incrustoporiaceae
- Genus: Skeletocutis
- Species: S. africana

Binomial name
- Skeletocutis africana Ryvarden & P.Roberts (2006)

Species of fungus

Skeletocutis africana is a species of poroid crust fungus in the family Polyporaceae. Described as new to science in 2006 by mycologists Leif Ryvarden and Peter Roberts, the fungus is found in Cameroon, where it grows on logs in tropical lowland rainforest environments. The type collection was made in Korup National Park, in South West Province.

== Description ==
The fruit bodies of the fungus are crust-like, ranging in colour from cream to pale orange-buff. Pores on the surface are small, numbering 4–6 per millimetre, and angular to slot-like. The basidia (spore-bearing cells) are club-shaped, measuring 10–12 by 4–4.5 μm. Spores are hyaline, thin-walled, cylindrical to allantoid (sausage-shaped), and measure 2.8–3 by 0.8–1 μm. Skeletocutis africana has a dimitic hyphal system, containing both generative hyphae (measuring 2–3 μm wide) and skeletal hyphae (measuring 3–6 μm wide). The end hyphae of the dissepiments (pore edges) are encrusted in spiny microscopic crystals.
