= Leifiporia =

Scientific classification
- Kingdom: Fungi
- Division: Basidiomycota
- Class: Agaricomycetes
- Order: Polyporales
- Family: Polyporaceae
- Genus: Leifiporia; Y.C.Dai, F.Wu & C.L.Zhao (2016)

Type species
- Leifiporia rhizomorpha Y.C.Dai, F.Wu & C.L.Zhao (2016)

Species
- L. eucalypti L. rhizomorpha

Genus of fungi

Leifiporia is a genus of two species of poroid white rot crust fungi in the family Polyporaceae. The genus was circumscribed by Chinese mycologists in 2016 to accommodate the type species Leifiporia rhizomorpha.

== Taxonomy ==
Leifiporia was circumscribed in 2016 by Chinese mycologists Changlin Zhao, Fang Wu, and Yu-Cheng Dai. Molecular analysis shows that Leifiporia belongs to the "core polyporoid clade", a grouping of fungi roughly equivalent to the family Polyporaceae. The generic name honours Norwegian mycologist and polypore specialist Leif Ryvarden. The genus is phylogenetically close to the fungi Diplomitoporus overholtsii and Lopharia cinerascens. It also groups near Pycnoporus and Trametes. A new combination, Leifiporia eucalypti, was proposed by the authors. This fungus, originally described as Dichomitus eucalypti by Ryvarden in 1985, is found in Australia.

== Description ==
Leifiporia species are characterized by crust-like fruit bodies with an annual growth habit. Their pore surface is white to cream. Leifiporia has a dimitic hyphal system, containing both generative and skeletal hyphae. The generative hyphae have clamp connections and branch mostly at right angles. The skeletal hyphae are present in the subiculum only and distinctly thinner than the generative hyphae. The spores are ellipsoid, hyaline, thin-walled, and smooth. They usually contain one or two oil droplets.

== Habitat and distribution ==
The type species L. rhizomorpha has been collected from Anhui and Zhejiang provinces in eastern China. In both cases, the fungus was growing on a fallen angiosperm branch. Leifiporia eucalypti is found in the Northern Territory of Australia, where it grows on Eucalyptus camaldulensis. Both species cause white rot.
