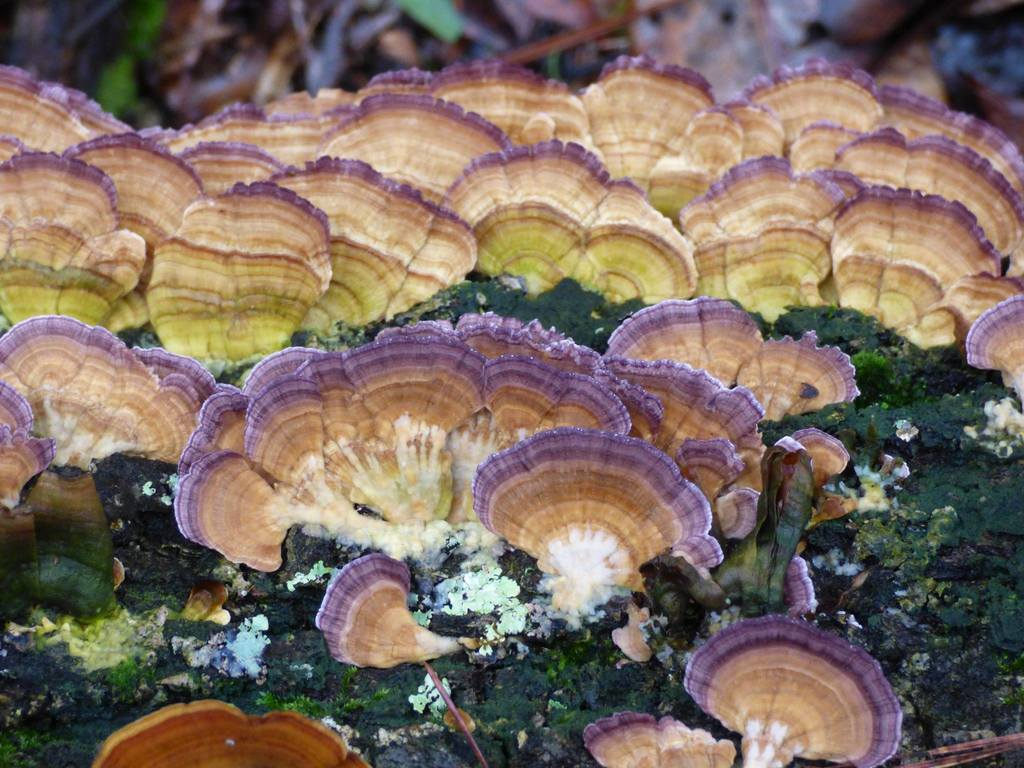

Scientific classification
- Kingdom: Fungi
- Division: Basidiomycota
- Class: Agaricomycetes
- Order: Hymenochaetales
- Family: Hymenochaetaceae
- Genus: Trichaptum
- Species: T. biforme

Binomial name
- Trichaptum biforme (Fr.) Ryvarden (1972)

Synonyms
- Polyporus biformis Fr. (1833); Polyporus pargamenus Fr. (1833); Hirschioporus pargamenus (Fr.) Bondartsev & Singer (1941)

= Trichaptum biforme =

Species of fungus

Trichaptum biforme
- Mycological characteristics
- Teeth on hymenium
- Cap is offset or indistinct
- Hymenium is decurrent
- Lacks a stipe or is bare
- Spore print is white to purple
- Ecology is saprotrophic or parasitic
- Edibility is inedible

Trichaptum biforme, commonly known as the violet-pored bracket fungus, purple tooth, or violet-toothed polypore, is a species of poroid fungus in the order Hymenochaetales.

== Description ==
Growing to 1–7.5 centimetres (1/2–3 in) in width, it is initially violet before fading into zones of white to brown, retaining violet at the margin for a time.

=== Similar species ===
It is sometimes confused with Trichaptum abietinum, which grows almost exclusively on conifers, as do T. byssogenum and T. fuscoviolaceum. Skeletocutis lilacina is also similar.

== Distribution and ecology ==
T.biforme is a saprobe that decomposes hardwood stumps and logs. Widely distributed, it occurs on at least 65 tree hosts. It rarely grows on conifers, but has been recorded from pine (Pinus) deadwood.

T.biforme was once recorded in association with the little-known pleasing fungus beetle Haematochiton elateroides, but it is suspected that the beetles were not feeding on this tough and leathery fungus, but simply hibernating in the dead log on which it grew.

== Toxicity ==
It is inedible.
