= Skeletocutis subodora =

Scientific classification
- Kingdom: Fungi
- Division: Basidiomycota
- Class: Agaricomycetes
- Order: Polyporales
- Family: Incrustoporiaceae
- Genus: Skeletocutis
- Species: S. subodora

Binomial name
- Skeletocutis subodora Vlasák & Ryvarden (2012)

Species of fungus

Skeletocutis subodora is a species of poroid crust fungus in the family Polyporaceae. It was described as a new species by mycologists Josef Vlasák and Leif Ryvarden in 2012. The type specimen was collected in the Crater Lake visitor's centre in Oregon, United States, where it was growing on a log of Douglas fir. It is named after its similarity to Skeletocutis odora, from which it differs in microscopic characteristics, including its thick subiculum, non-allantoid (sausage-shaped) spores, large cystidioles, and monomitic flesh.
