= Skeletocutis borealis =

Scientific classification
- Domain: Eukaryota
- Kingdom: Fungi
- Division: Basidiomycota
- Class: Agaricomycetes
- Order: Polyporales
- Family: Incrustoporiaceae
- Genus: Skeletocutis
- Species: S. borealis

Binomial name
- Skeletocutis borealis Niemelä (1998)

Species of fungus

Skeletocutis borealis is a rare species of poroid fungus in the family Polyporaceae. Found in northern Europe, it was described as new to science in 1998 by Finnish mycologist Tuomo Niemelä.

== Description ==
It forms a crust-like fruit body up to 4 mm thick, and typically up to 4 mm wide and 2–5 cm long. The sterile margin of the fruit body is narrow and white, while the pore surface is pale cream to pale salmon, comprising angular pores numbering 6–7 per mm.

Skeletocutis borealis has a dimitic hyphal system, with both generative and skeletal hyphae. Typical of the genus Skeletocutis, the generative hyphae of the dissepiment edges (the tissue between the pores) is encrusted with spiny crystals. The spores are cylindrical to somewhat sausage-shaped (allantoid), and measure 3.5–4.5 by 1.3–1.7 μm. The basidia (spore-bearing cells) are club shaped and measure 10–13 by 4–5 μm.

Skeletocutis stellae is somewhat similar in appearance, but its fruit body is not as thick, and it has smaller pores and narrower spores.

== Habitat and distribution ==
The fungus has been recorded only from Sweden and northern Finland, where it causes a white rot in Picea, Salix, and Sorbus. The type was collected in Pyhäjärvi, Selkäinjärvi, Finland, found growing on a dead trunk of Salix caprea.
