= Grammothele bambusicola =

Scientific classification
- Domain: Eukaryota
- Kingdom: Fungi
- Division: Basidiomycota
- Class: Agaricomycetes
- Order: Polyporales
- Family: Polyporaceae
- Genus: Grammothele
- Species: G. bambusicola

Binomial name
- Grammothele bambusicola Ryvarden (1984)

Species of fungus

Grammothele bambusicola is a poroid crust fungus in the family Polyporaceae that is found in Asia. It was described as new to science in 1984 by Norwegian mycologist Leif Ryvarden.

== Description ==
Fruit bodies of the fungus are crust-like, measuring up to 1 mm thick, with a pore surface colour ranging from cream to straw to pale yellowish brown. The shallow pores number 2–3 per millimetre.

G. bambusicola has a dimitic hyphal system; its generative hyphae have clamp connections. Spores are more or less ellipsoid in shape, thin-walled, and measure 7–8.5 by 4–5 μm. The fungus is similar in morphology to Grammothele ochracea (found in Thailand), but differs from that species in having larger pores, more yellowish colour, and spores that are longer and more ellipsoid.

== Habitat and distribution ==
The type collection was made an altitude of 2,800 metres (9,200 ft) in Ghorepani, in the Gandaki Zone of Nepal, in October 1979. It was found growing on Bambusa. The species was later reported from Takatsuki, Osaka.
