= Skeletocutis azorica =

Scientific classification
- Domain: Eukaryota
- Kingdom: Fungi
- Division: Basidiomycota
- Class: Agaricomycetes
- Order: Polyporales
- Family: Incrustoporiaceae
- Genus: Skeletocutis
- Species: S. azorica

Binomial name
- Skeletocutis azorica (D.A.Reid) Jülich (1982)

Synonyms
- Incrustoporia azorica D.A.Reid (1977); Ceriporiopsis azorica (D.A.Reid) Ryvarden & Gilb. (1993)

Species of fungus

Skeletocutis azorica is a species of poroid fungus in the family Polyporaceae. It has only been found in Portugal.

== Taxonomy ==
It was first described in 1977 as a member of the now-defunct genus Incrustoporia by Derek Reid. Walter Jülich transferred it to Skeletocutis in 1982.

== Description ==
The hyphal system is monomitic, meaning it contains only generative hyphae. These hyphae have clamps and are hyaline, thin-walled, richly branched, measuring 2–3 μm in diameter. Those close to the substrate are heavily encrusted. Cystidia are absent from the hymenium. Fusoid cystidioles present in the hymenium, thin-walled, not encrusted, 9–12 by 3–4 μm, with a basal clamp. The basidia are ovoid to clavate, four-sterigmate, 9–12 by 4–5 μm, with a basal clamp. Spores are oblong-ellipsoid, slightly curved, hyaline, smooth, do not stain with Melzer's reagent, and measure 3–4 by 1.5–2 μm.

== Habitat and distribution ==
Skeletocutis azorica is found only in the Azores of Portugal, where it causes a white rot on woody substrates of Pinus, Cryptomeria, and also on the fern Pteridium.
