= Skeletocutis luteolus =

Scientific classification
- Domain: Eukaryota
- Kingdom: Fungi
- Division: Basidiomycota
- Class: Agaricomycetes
- Order: Polyporales
- Family: Incrustoporiaceae
- Genus: Skeletocutis
- Species: S. luteolus

Binomial name
- Skeletocutis luteolus B.K.Cui & Y.C.Dai (2008)

Species of fungus

Skeletocutis luteolus is a species of poroid crust fungus in the family Polyporaceae. It is found in southern and eastern China, where it causes white rot.

== Taxonomy ==
The fungus was described as new to science in 2008 by mycologists Bao-Kai Cui and Yu-Cheng Dai. The type collection, made in Wuzhishan Nature Reserve in Wuzhishan County (Hainan), was found growing on decaying angiosperm wood. The specific epithet luteolus (yellowish) refers to the colour of the dry pore surface.

== Description ==
The fruit body of Skeletocutis luteolus is in the form of a crust with dimensions of up to 7 cm (2.8 in) long by 3 cm (1.2 in) wide by 0.3 cm (0.12 in) thick. Fresh fruit bodies, typically white to cream in colour, have a soft texture that becomes corky, and deepens in colour to buff-yellow or orange-buff when dry. The round to angular pores number about five to seven per millimetre.

The fungus has a dimitic hyphal system (with both generative and skeletal hyphae), and the generative hyphae have clamp connections. The spores are hyaline (translucent), allantoid (sausage-shaped), and typically measure 3–3.6 by 0.4–0.7 μm.

Skeletocutis luteolus is somewhat similar in appearance to S. nivea and S. fimbriata. It can be distinguished from S. nivea by differences in fruit body morphology and smaller pores. Unlike S. luteolus, S. fimbriata has a distinct margin encircling the fruit body, and it has larger pores.
