= Dichomitus hubeiensis =

Scientific classification
- Domain: Eukaryota
- Kingdom: Fungi
- Division: Basidiomycota
- Class: Agaricomycetes
- Order: Polyporales
- Family: Polyporaceae
- Genus: Dichomitus
- Species: D. hubeiensis

Binomial name
- Dichomitus hubeiensis Hai J.Li & B.K.Cui (2013)

Species of fungus

Dichomitus hubeiensis is a crust fungus that was described as a new species in 2013. The fungus is characterized by the cream to straw-yellow pore surface and large pores numbering 1–2 per millimetre. Microscopic features include both inamyloid and indextrinoid skeletal hyphae, the presence of cystidioles and dendrohyphidia in the hymenium, and roughly ellipsoid spores that measure 10–14 by 5.6–7.0 μm. The specific epithet refers to the type locality in Hubei, central China.
