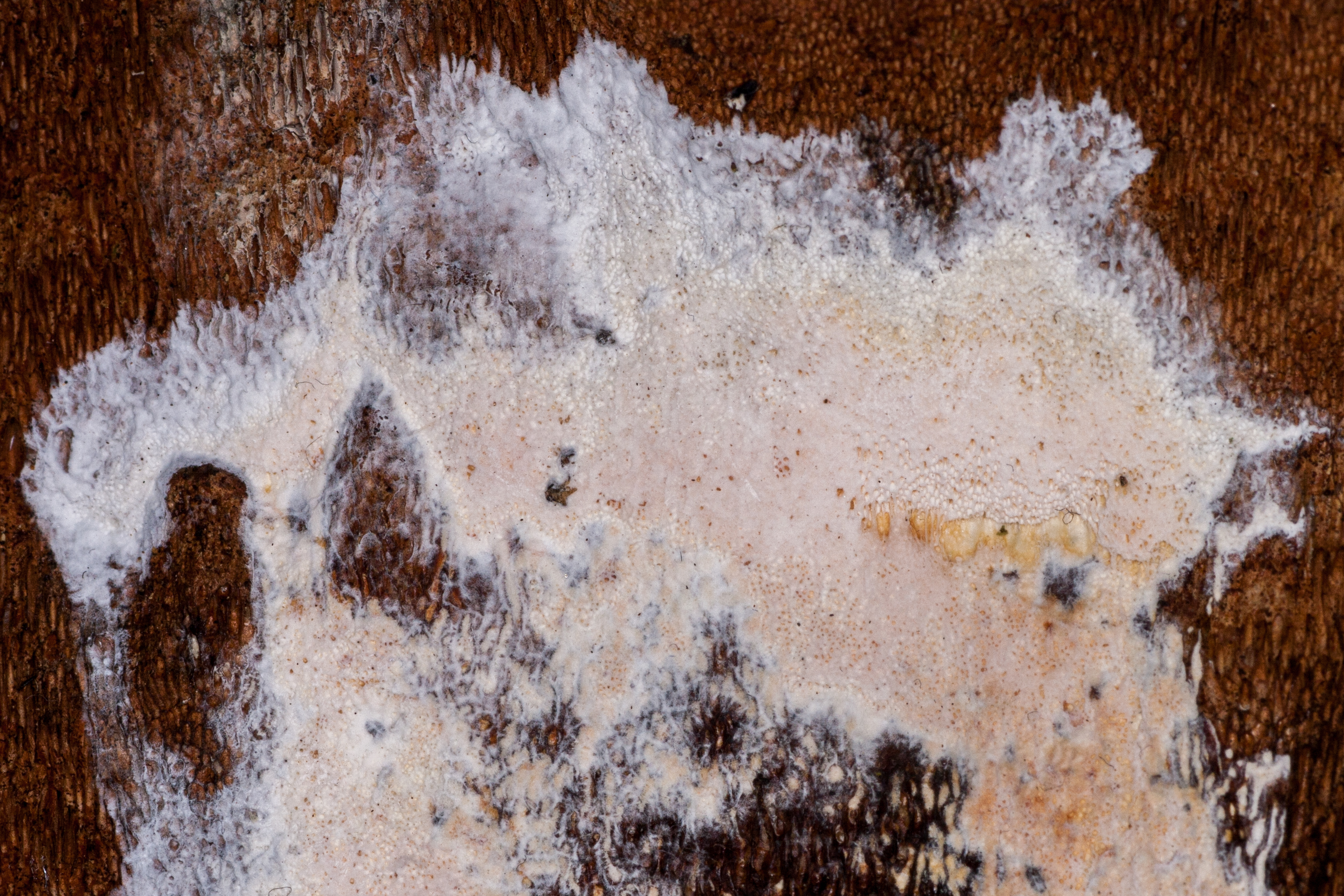

Scientific classification
- Domain: Eukaryota
- Kingdom: Fungi
- Division: Basidiomycota
- Class: Agaricomycetes
- Order: Polyporales
- Family: Incrustoporiaceae
- Genus: Skeletocutis
- Species: S. chrysella

Binomial name
- Skeletocutis chrysella Niemelä (1998)

= Skeletocutis chrysella =

Species of fungus

Skeletocutis chrysella is a species of poroid crust fungus in the family Polyporaceae. Found primarily in Northern Europe, it has a boreal distribution, and has also been collected in East Karelia, Yakutia, and North America. It is classified as a vulnerable species on the Norwegian Red list, where it is considered to be declining.

The fungus was described as new to science in 1998 by mycologist Tuomo Niemelä. The type collection made in Finland, where it was found growing on a dead fruit body of Phellinus chrysoloma, a polypore fungus that is found only in old-growth forest. As its successor, S. chrysella is highly susceptible to forest management and disturbances. Molecular analysis suggests that it is closely related to Skeletocutis kuehneri.
