= Skeletocutis bicolor =

Scientific classification
- Domain: Eukaryota
- Kingdom: Fungi
- Division: Basidiomycota
- Class: Agaricomycetes
- Order: Polyporales
- Family: Incrustoporiaceae
- Genus: Skeletocutis
- Species: S. bicolor

Binomial name
- Skeletocutis bicolor (Lloyd) Ryvarden (1992)

Synonyms
- Polystictus bicolor Lloyd (1920)

Species of fungus

Skeletocutis bicolor is a species of poroid crust fungus in the family Polyporaceae. It is found in Singapore.

== Taxonomy ==
The fungus was originally described as new to science in 1920 by American mycologist Curtis Gates Lloyd as Polystictus bicolor. He characterized it as follows: "Small, about a cm., growing broadly, attached to the host and developing a little, conchate pileus." The type was collected in Singapore by English botanist Thomas Ford Chipp. Leif Ryvarden examined Lloyd's type collections, and transferred the species to the genus Skeletocutis in 1992.

== Description ==
The fruitbody is in the form of a crust with the edges sticking out to form small caps up to 4 mm wide. It has a smooth, pale brown surface. The pore surface, or hymenium, comprises tiny angular pores that number 6–7 per mm. Skeletocutis bicolor has a dimitic hyphal system, meaning it has both generative hyphae and skeletal hyphae. The skeletal hyphae are covered with spiny crystals, especially in the dissepiments (the tissue between the pores)—a characteristic feature of the genus Skeletocutis. The spores are spherical, hyaline (translucent), and measure 2.5–3 μm in diameter.
