= Skeletocutis brevispora =

Scientific classification
- Kingdom: Fungi
- Division: Basidiomycota
- Class: Agaricomycetes
- Order: Polyporales
- Family: Incrustoporiaceae
- Genus: Skeletocutis
- Species: S. brevispora

Binomial name
- Skeletocutis brevispora Niemelä (1998)

Species of fungus

Skeletocutis brevispora is a species of poroid crust fungus in the family Polyporaceae. It was described as new to science in 1998 by Finnish mycologist Tuomo Niemelä.

== Description ==
The fruit bodies of this fungus are crust-like with a waxy texture. Its dimensions are usually small, with a thickness of up to 2 mm, and a length typically no more than 2–3 cm (0.8–1.2 in). The pore surface is cream-white when fresh, but dries to a pale yellow or pale orange colour. The pores are tiny and angular, usually numbering 6–8 per mm.

The fungus has a dimitic hyphal system, meaning that it contains both generative and skeletal hyphae. Typical of the genus Skeletocutis, the generative hyphae of S. brevispora are encrusted with spiny crystals on the dissepiments (the tissue between the pores). Spores are cylindrical to somewhat sausage-shaped (allantoid), and measure 3–4 by 1–1.5 μm.

== Habitat and distribution ==
Skeletocutis brevispora has usually been recorded from Fennoscandia where it grows on dead fruit bodies of the polypore fungus Phellinidium ferrugineofuscum. Rarely, it is found growing on dead spruce wood that has been rotted by this fungus. S. brevispora has also been found in northeast China, and in Ukraine.
