= Skeletocutis microcarpa =

Scientific classification
- Kingdom: Fungi
- Division: Basidiomycota
- Class: Agaricomycetes
- Order: Polyporales
- Family: Incrustoporiaceae
- Genus: Skeletocutis
- Species: S. microcarpa

Binomial name
- Skeletocutis microcarpa Ryvarden & Iturr.

Species of fungus

Skeletocutis microcarpa is a species of poroid fungus in the family Polyporaceae that is found in Venezuela. It was reported as a new species by mycologists Leif Ryvarden and Teresa Iturriaga. The type collection was made in January 1997, in Yutajé (Amazonas State), where it was found growing on the bark of a living tree. The fruit bodies of this fungus are in the form of small brown caps measuring up to 8 mm wide and long by 4 mm thick. Its spores are smooth, ellipsoid, hyaline, and measure 3–3.3 by 2 μm.
