= Skeletocutis brunneomarginata =

Scientific classification
- Domain: Eukaryota
- Kingdom: Fungi
- Division: Basidiomycota
- Class: Agaricomycetes
- Order: Polyporales
- Family: Incrustoporiaceae
- Genus: Skeletocutis
- Species: S. brunneomarginata

Binomial name
- Skeletocutis brunneomarginata Ryvarden (2009)

Species of fungus

Skeletocutis brunneomarginata is a species of poroid crust fungus in the family Polyporaceae. Found in the United States, it was described as new to science in 2007 by Norwegian mycologist Leif Ryvarden. He collected the type in Bent Creek Experimental Forest, North Carolina in 2004. The fungus is very similar in appearance to Skeletocutis kühneri, but with a brown margin and subiculum. S. brunneomarginata is one of 14 Skeletocutis species that occurs in North America.
