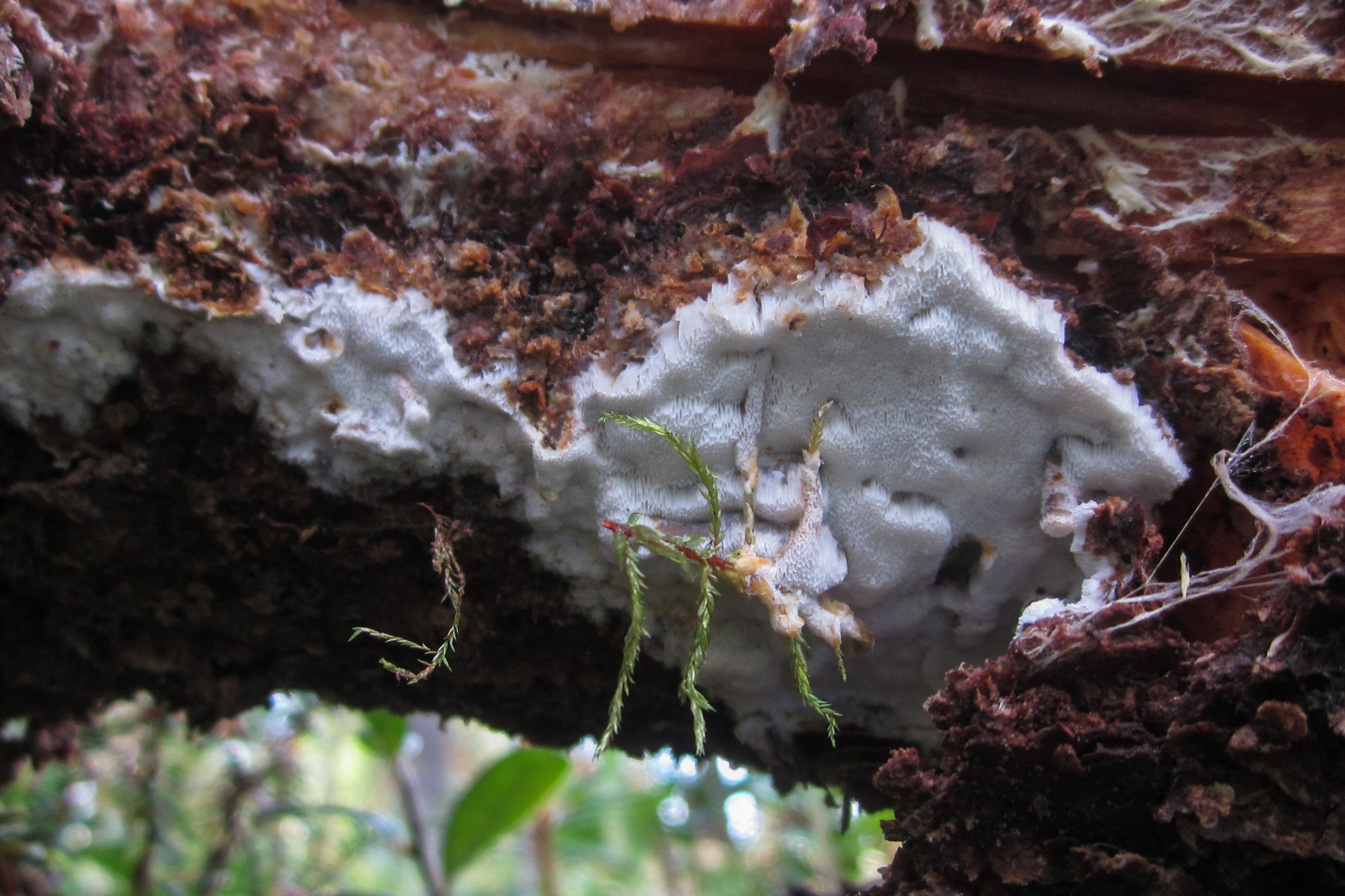

Scientific classification
- Domain: Eukaryota
- Kingdom: Fungi
- Division: Basidiomycota
- Class: Agaricomycetes
- Order: Polyporales
- Family: Incrustoporiaceae
- Genus: Skeletocutis
- Species: S. kuehneri

Binomial name
- Skeletocutis kuehneri A.David (1982)

= Skeletocutis kuehneri =

Species of fungus

Skeletocutis kuehneri is a species of poroid crust fungus in the family Polyporaceae. It was described as new to science by Alix David in 1982. The holotype was collected in France, where it was found growing on pine. It has been recorded from Norway, Finland, and Sweden, although it is rare in the Nordic countries. The fungus is a successor species, and prefers growing on pine that has been previously degraded by Trichaptum fungi, particularly T. abietinum.
