= Skeletocutis niveicolor =

Scientific classification
- Domain: Eukaryota
- Kingdom: Fungi
- Division: Basidiomycota
- Class: Agaricomycetes
- Order: Polyporales
- Family: Incrustoporiaceae
- Genus: Skeletocutis
- Species: S. niveicolor

Binomial name
- Skeletocutis niveicolor (Murrill) Ryvarden (1985)

Synonyms
- Poria niveicolor Murrill (1920)

Species of fungus

Skeletocutis niveicolor is a species of poroid crust fungus in the family Polyporaceae. It was first described in 1920 by American mycologist William Alphonso Murrill as Poria niveicolor. The type was collected on well-rotted wood found in Cockpit Country, Jamaica in 1909. Leif Ryvarden transferred it to the genus Skeletocutis in 1985. He noted that it was readily distinguished from other Skeletocutis species by its small spores, which measure 2.5–3.1 by 1.5–2 μm. In addition to Jamaica, the fungus has been also reported from Argentina and Costa Rica.
