= Abundisporus =

Scientific classification
- Kingdom: Fungi
- Division: Basidiomycota
- Class: Agaricomycetes
- Order: Polyporales
- Family: Polyporaceae
- Genus: Abundisporus; Ryvarden (1999)

Type species
- Abundisporus fuscopurpureus (Pers.) Ryvarden (1999)

Species
- A. fuscopurpureus A. mollissimus A. pubertatis A. quercicola: A. resupinatus; A. roseoalbus A. sclerosetosus A. violaceus

Genus of fungi

Abundisporus is a small genus of poroid fungi currently with seven recognized species. They differ from other polypores in having coloured rather than hyaline spores.

== Taxonomy ==
The genus was circumscribed by Norwegian mycologist Leif Ryvarden in 1999, who included the morphological similar fungi Abundisporus roseoalbus, A. violaceus, and the type species, A. fuscopurpureus. Molecular phylogenetic analysis suggests that Abundisporus is monophyletic, and is clustered in the "core polyporoid clade", a phylogenetic grouping of fungi roughly equivalent in composition to the family Polyporaceae.

== Description ==
Abundisporus has either resupinate (crust-like) or pileate (cap-like) fruit bodies with internal tissue (context) that ranges in colour from pale umber deep purplish brown or greyish to umber brown. Abundisporus has a dimitic hyphal structure with yellow to pale brown skeletal hyphae. Spores produced are pale yellowish, non-dextrinoid, and ellipsoid with slightly thick walls. The tissues of Abundisporus turn brown in potassium hydroxide.

== Species ==
As of January 2025, Index Fungorum accepts eight species of Abundisporus:

- Abundisporus fuscopurpureus (Pers.) Ryvarden (1999)
- Abundisporus mollissimus B.K.Cui, H.Chen & C.L.Zhao (2015)
- Abundisporus pubertatis (Lloyd) Parmasto (2000)
- Abundisporus quercicola Y.C.Dai (2002) – China
- Abundisporus resupinatus Decock & Ryvarden (2021)
- Abundisporus roseoalbus (Jungh.) Ryvarden (1999)
- Abundisporus sclerosetosus Decock & Laurence (2000) – Singapore
- Abundisporus violaceus (Wakef.) Ryvarden (1999)

Abundisporus subflexibilis (Berk. & M.A.Curtis) Parmasto (2000) is now considered to be synonymous with A. roseoalbus.
