= Skeletocutis bambusicola =

Scientific classification
- Domain: Eukaryota
- Kingdom: Fungi
- Division: Basidiomycota
- Class: Agaricomycetes
- Order: Polyporales
- Family: Incrustoporiaceae
- Genus: Skeletocutis
- Species: S. bambusicola

Binomial name
- Skeletocutis bambusicola L.W.Zhou & W.M.Qin (2012)

Species of fungus

Skeletocutis bambusicola is a species of poroid crust fungus in the family Polyporaceae. It was described as new to science in 2012 by mycologists Li-Wei Zhou and Wen-Min Qin. It is found in southern China, where it grows on dead bamboo. The type collection was made in Mengla County, Yunnan Province. The specific epithet bambusicola refers to its growth on bamboo. At the time of publication, S. bambusicola was the 22nd Skeletocutis species recorded from China.

== Description ==
The fruit body forms a 1 mm-thick cream-coloured crust on the bamboo up to 13 cm (5.1 in) long and 3.5 cm (1.4 in) wide. It has a soft texture when fresh, but becomes corky when dry. The hymenium comprises tiny round to angular pores numbering 8 to 11 per mm.

Skeletocutis bambusicola has a dimitic hyphal system, meaning it has both generative and skeletal hyphae. Most of the generative hyphae bear clamp connections. The basidia (spore-bearing cells) are club-shaped with four sterigmata, and have a clamp at the base; they measure 12–20 by 4–5 μm. The spores are ellipsoid in shape, hyaline (translucent), smooth and thin-walled. They measure 2.7–3.1 by 1.5–1.9 μm.
