= Abundisporus sclerosetosus =

Scientific classification
- Domain: Eukaryota
- Kingdom: Fungi
- Division: Basidiomycota
- Class: Agaricomycetes
- Order: Polyporales
- Family: Polyporaceae
- Genus: Abundisporus
- Species: A. sclerosetosus

Binomial name
- Abundisporus sclerosetosus Decock & Laurence (2000)

Species of fungus

Abundisporus sclerosetosus is a species of bracket fungus in the family Polyporaceae that was described as new to science in 2000. It causes white rot on large decaying trunks of Shorea. A. sclerosetosus is found in the Bukit Timah Nature Reserve in Singapore. Fruit bodies of the fungus have light brown to dark reddish-brown caps with a cream to yellowish margin. Its spores are usually ellipsoid, markedly thick-walled, and measure 3.0–3.7 by 2.2–2.6 μm. A distinguishing microscopic characteristic of this fungus is the finger- or bristle-like hyphae in the trama of the tubes. The authors characterize the hyphal system as trimitic, but with reservations.
