= Skeletocutis pseudo-odora =

Scientific classification
- Domain: Eukaryota
- Kingdom: Fungi
- Division: Basidiomycota
- Class: Agaricomycetes
- Order: Polyporales
- Family: Incrustoporiaceae
- Genus: Skeletocutis
- Species: S. pseudo-odora

Binomial name
- Skeletocutis pseudo-odora L.F.Fan & Jing Si (2017)

Species of fungus

Skeletocutis pseudo-odora is a species of poroid crust fungus in the family Polyporaceae. It was described as a new species by Chinese mycologists in 2017. The type specimen was collected from Leigongshan Nature Reserve in Leishan County, Guizhou Province. It was growing on a fallen branch of Chinese white pine, at an altitude of 1,800 metres (5,900 ft). The fungus is named after its similarity to Skeletocutis odora.
