= Skeletocutis substellae =

Scientific classification
- Kingdom: Fungi
- Division: Basidiomycota
- Class: Agaricomycetes
- Order: Polyporales
- Family: Incrustoporiaceae
- Genus: Skeletocutis
- Species: S. substellae

Binomial name
- Skeletocutis substellae Y.C.Dai (2011)

Species of fungus

Skeletocutis substellae is a species of poroid crust fungus in the family Polyporaceae. Found in China, it was described as new to science in 2011 by mycologist Yu-Cheng Dai. The holotype specimen was collected in Hainan, was it was found growing on the rotting wood of Dacrydium elatum. Spores of the fungus are allantoid (sausage shaped), translucent, thin-walled, and smooth, typically measuring 2.8–3.5 by 0.7–1 μm. S. substellae was named for its similarity to S. stellae. Differences from this latter fungus include swollen skeletal hyphae when mounted in a solution of potassium hydroxide, and smaller spores.
