= Grammothele lacticolor =

Scientific classification
- Domain: Eukaryota
- Kingdom: Fungi
- Division: Basidiomycota
- Class: Agaricomycetes
- Order: Polyporales
- Family: Polyporaceae
- Genus: Grammothele
- Species: G. lacticolor

Binomial name
- Grammothele lacticolor Ryvarden (2015)

Species of fungus

Grammothele lacticolor is a poroid crust fungus in the family Polyporaceae that is found in Puerto Rico. It was described as new to science in 2015 by Norwegian mycologist Leif Ryvarden.
