= Grammothele venezuelica =

Scientific classification
- Domain: Eukaryota
- Kingdom: Fungi
- Division: Basidiomycota
- Class: Agaricomycetes
- Order: Polyporales
- Family: Polyporaceae
- Genus: Grammothele
- Species: G. venezuelica

Binomial name
- Grammothele venezuelica Ryvarden (2015)

Species of fungus

Grammothele venezuelica is a poroid crust fungi in the family Polyporaceae. Found in Venezuela, it was described as new to science in 2015 by Norwegian mycologist Leif Ryvarden. The holotype collection was made in Estado Aruga, Choroní, where the fungus was discovered growing on hardwood.
