= Skeletocutis yunnanensis =

Scientific classification
- Domain: Eukaryota
- Kingdom: Fungi
- Division: Basidiomycota
- Class: Agaricomycetes
- Order: Polyporales
- Family: Incrustoporiaceae
- Genus: Skeletocutis
- Species: S. yunnanensis

Binomial name
- Skeletocutis yunnanensis L.S.Bian, C.L.Zhao & F.Wu (2016)

Species of fungus

Skeletocutis yunnanensis is a species of poroid crust fungus in the family Polyporaceae that was described as a new species in 2016. The type specimen was collected in northern Yunnan Province, southwestern China, where it was found growing on decaying angiosperm wood in a temperate forest.

== Description ==
The fungus is characterized by a white, resupinate (crust-like) fruit body with a cream to buff pore surface, and the near absence of a sterile margin when mature. The angular pores number 5–6 per mm with entire mouths. It has a dimitic hyphal structure, containing both generative and skeletal hyphae. The generative hyphae in the subiculum and the trama are covered by fine crystals. The spores are allantoid (sausage-shaped), hyaline, smooth and thin walled, measuring 3.5–4.5 by 1.0–1.2 μm. They typically contain two small oil droplets.
