= Skeletocutis polyporicola =

Scientific classification
- Domain: Eukaryota
- Kingdom: Fungi
- Division: Basidiomycota
- Class: Agaricomycetes
- Order: Polyporales
- Family: Incrustoporiaceae
- Genus: Skeletocutis
- Species: S. polyporicola

Binomial name
- Skeletocutis polyporicola Ryvarden & Iturr. (2011)

Species of fungus

Skeletocutis polyporicola is a species of poroid crust fungus in the family Polyporaceae that is found in South America. It was described as a new species in 2011 by mycologists Leif Ryvarden and Teresa Iturriaga. The holotype, collected in Venezuela, was found growing on a dead fruit body of Fomitopsis supina.
