= Grammothele africana =

Scientific classification
- Domain: Eukaryota
- Kingdom: Fungi
- Division: Basidiomycota
- Class: Agaricomycetes
- Order: Polyporales
- Family: Polyporaceae
- Genus: Grammothele
- Species: G. africana

Binomial name
- Grammothele africana Ipulet & Ryvarden (2005)

Species of fungus

Grammothele africana is a poroid crust fungus in the family Polyporaceae. Found in Uganda, it was described as new to science in 2005 by mycologists Perpetua Ipulet and Leif Ryvarden. The type was collected in Bwindi Impenetrable National Park, where it was found growing on rotting fallen branches.
