= Abundisporus quercicola =

Scientific classification
- Kingdom: Fungi
- Division: Basidiomycota
- Class: Agaricomycetes
- Order: Polyporales
- Family: Polyporaceae
- Genus: Abundisporus
- Species: A. quercicola

Binomial name
- Abundisporus quercicola Y.C.Dai (2002)

Species of fungus

Abundisporus quercicola is a species of bracket fungus that grows on living oaks in temperate forests in the foothills of the Himalaya (People's Republic of China). The fruit bodies are perennial, grey to black above with concentric markings and white below. The fungus grows to 7 cm wide and 5 cm thick, projecting up to 5 cm from the substrate. The basidiospores are yellow.
