= Grammothele hainanensis =

Scientific classification
- Domain: Eukaryota
- Kingdom: Fungi
- Division: Basidiomycota
- Class: Agaricomycetes
- Order: Polyporales
- Family: Polyporaceae
- Genus: Grammothele
- Species: G. hainanensis

Binomial name
- Grammothele hainanensis F.Wu & L.W.Zhou (2016)

Species of fungus

Grammothele hainanensis is a poroid crust fungi in the family Polyporaceae. Described as a new species in 2016, it is named for Hainan, the type locality. It has cylindrical spores that have dimensions of 7–8.1 by 2.3–2.9 μm.
