= Abundisporus mollissimus =

Scientific classification
- Domain: Eukaryota
- Kingdom: Fungi
- Division: Basidiomycota
- Class: Agaricomycetes
- Order: Polyporales
- Family: Polyporaceae
- Genus: Abundisporus
- Species: A. mollissimus

Binomial name
- Abundisporus mollissimus B.K.Cui & C.L.Zhao (2015)

Species of fungus

Abundisporus mollissimus is a species of bracket fungus in the family Polyporaceae. This white rot fungus was described as new to science in 2015 by mycologists Bao-Kai Cui and Chang-Lin Zhao. The type was found fruiting on a fallen angiosperm trunk in Chengmai County (Hainan Province, China); it has also been found on a dead tree of Xanthophyllum hainanense. A. mollissimus is distinguished from other Abundisporus species by its effused-reflexed to pileate and soft fruit bodies, narrower skeletal hyphae, and spores that measure 4–4.5 by 3–3.5 μm.
