= Skeletocutis inflata =

Scientific classification
- Domain: Eukaryota
- Kingdom: Fungi
- Division: Basidiomycota
- Class: Agaricomycetes
- Order: Polyporales
- Family: Incrustoporiaceae
- Genus: Skeletocutis
- Species: S. inflata

Binomial name
- Skeletocutis inflata B.K.Cui (2013)

Species of fungus

Skeletocutis inflata is a species of poroid fungus in the family Polyporaceae. Found in Guangdong, China, it was described as a new species in 2013 by mycologist Bao-Kai Cui. The fungus is characterized by having fruit bodies with caps, and small pores numbering 8–10 per millimetre. Microscopically, it features inflated skeletal hyphae (after which it is named) that partially dissolve in a solution of potassium hydroxide (KOH). The skeletal hyphae in the trama are parallel along the tubes.
