= Skeletocutis papyracea =

Scientific classification
- Domain: Eukaryota
- Kingdom: Fungi
- Division: Basidiomycota
- Class: Agaricomycetes
- Order: Polyporales
- Family: Incrustoporiaceae
- Genus: Skeletocutis
- Species: S. papyracea

Binomial name
- Skeletocutis papyracea A.David (1982)

Species of fungus

Skeletocutis papyracea is a species of poroid crust fungus in the family Polyporaceae. It was described as new to science by Alix David in 1982. The type specimen was collected in France, where it was found growing on a fallen trunk of Scots pine. The fungus was reported in northeastern China in 2005, and in Lithuania in 2013. A microscope is useful for the identification of this fungus; it differs from other Skeletocutis by the fact that its skeletal hyphae dissolve in a 5% KOH solution.
