= Dichomitus eucalypti =

Scientific classification
- Domain: Eukaryota
- Kingdom: Fungi
- Division: Basidiomycota
- Class: Agaricomycetes
- Order: Polyporales
- Family: Polyporaceae
- Genus: Dichomitus
- Species: D. eucalypti

Binomial name
- Dichomitus eucalypti Ryvarden (1985)

Species of fungus

Dichomitus eucalypti is a crust fungus that was described as a new species in 1985 by Norwegian mycologist Leif Ryvarden. The fruit body of the fungus measures 1–2 cm in diameter, and has a white to pale cream pore surface with small round pores numbering 2–3 per millimetre. D. eucalypti has a dimitic hyphal structure, containing both generative and binding hyphae. Generative hyphae are thin walled with clamps, and measure 2.5–4 μm in diameter. Found in the context, the binding hyphae are solid, hyaline, and measure 2–5 μm. Spores are more or less cylindrical, thin-walled and hyaline, and have dimensions of 7–8.5 by 3–4 μm.

The type was collected in George Gill Range (Northern Territory, Australia), where it was growing on river red gum (Eucalyptus camaldulensis). At the time of its description, D. eucalypti was, in addition to D. epitephrus and D. leucoplacus, the third species of Dichomitus found in Australia.
