= Skeletocutis friata =

Scientific classification
- Domain: Eukaryota
- Kingdom: Fungi
- Division: Basidiomycota
- Class: Agaricomycetes
- Order: Polyporales
- Family: Incrustoporiaceae
- Genus: Skeletocutis
- Species: S. friata

Binomial name
- Skeletocutis friata Niemelä & Saaren. (2001)

Synonyms
- Skeletocutis friabilis Niemelä & Saaren. (1998)

Species of fungus

Skeletocutis friata is a rare species of poroid crust fungus in the family Polyporaceae. Found in Finland, it was first described as a new species in 1998 by Tuomo Niemelä and Reima Saarenoksa, with the name Skeletocutis friabilis. It was given the epithet friata three years later, after it was discovered that a tropical Asian species had already been given the name Skeletocutis friabilis, with a publication date two months prior to theirs. The holotype was collected by Saarenoksa in Sipoo, southern Finland, where it was found growing on the bark and exposed wood of a fallen twig of common alder (Alnus glutinosa). The authors later noted that subsequent searching of the type locality, as well as other locations in southern Finland, failed to turn up additional examples of this species.

The external appearance of the fruit body is unremarkable, and similar to other soft, light-coloured pored crust fungi such as Hyphodontia radula, Ceriporiopsis balaenae, and young specimens of Ceriporiopsis resinascens. The microscopic characteristics of S. friata however, are quite distinct from others in Skeletocutis: "Generative hyphae dominate all parts of the basidiocarp as a delicate, uniform network, and skeletals intermingle as isolated, worm-like structures." The fungus is named (friata) for the friable (easily crumbled) texture the fruit bodies take on when dry.
