= Skeletocutis stramentica =

Scientific classification
- Kingdom: Fungi
- Division: Basidiomycota
- Class: Agaricomycetes
- Order: Polyporales
- Family: Incrustoporiaceae
- Genus: Skeletocutis
- Species: S. stramentica

Binomial name
- Skeletocutis stramentica (G.Cunn.) Rajchenb. (1995)

Synonyms
- Tyromyces stramenticus G.Cunn. (1965)

Species of fungus

Skeletocutis stramentica is a species of poroid fungus in the family Polyporaceae that is found in New Zealand.

== Taxonomy ==
The species was first described in 1965 by mycologist Gordon Herriot Cunningham, who placed it in the genus Tyromyces. The type was collected near Mount Ruapehu on the North Island of New Zealand, where the fungus was found growing on black beech. Mario Rajchenberg transferred the taxon to Skeletocutis in 1995.

== Description ==
Characteristic features of Skeletocutis stramentica include the coarse bundles of agglutinated hyphae covering the cap surface, the agglutinated hyphae found in both the context and the dissepiments (tissue that is found between the pores), lacerate pore mouths, and the relatively small spores measuring 2.5–4 by 2–2.5 μm. The hyphal system is monomitic, and the generative hyphae have clamp connections.
