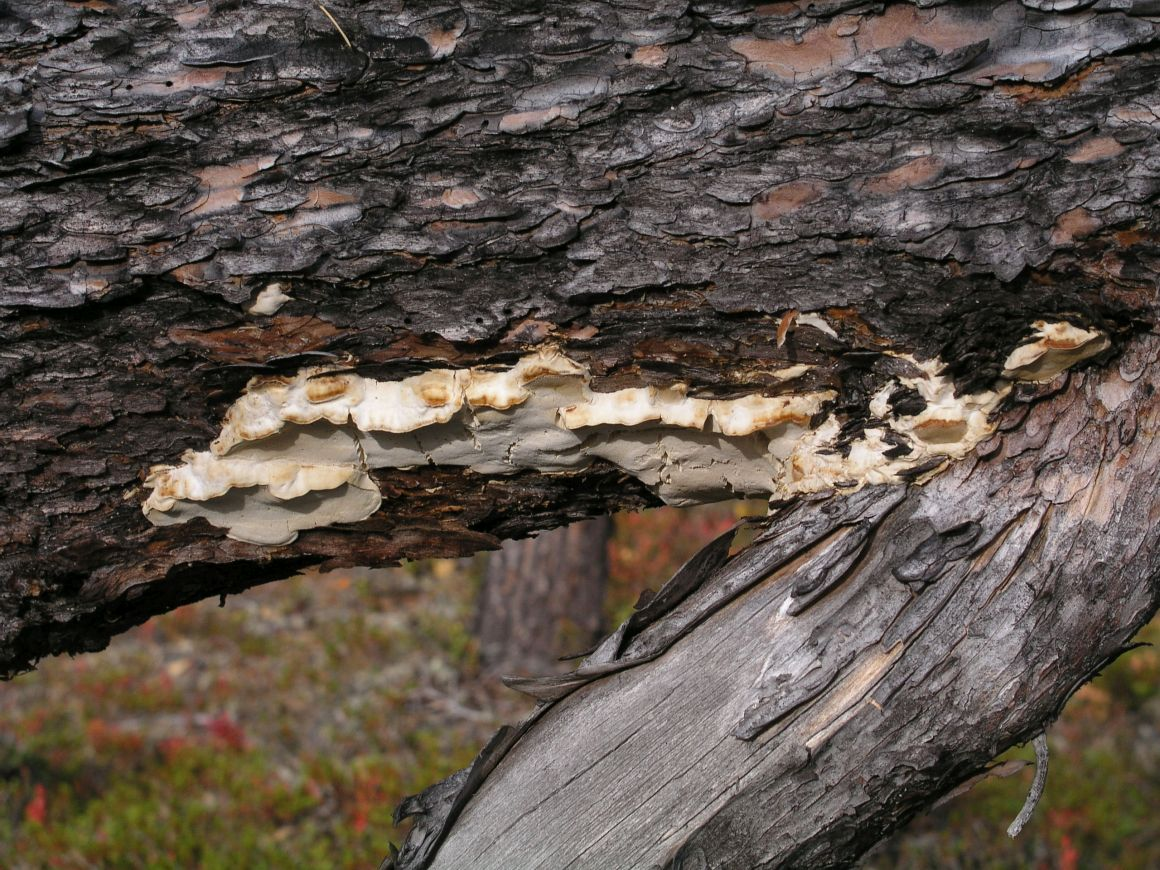

Scientific classification
- Domain: Eukaryota
- Kingdom: Fungi
- Division: Basidiomycota
- Class: Agaricomycetes
- Order: Polyporales
- Family: Polyporaceae
- Genus: Dichomitus
- Species: D. squalens

Binomial name
- Dichomitus squalens (P.Karst.) D.A.Reid

= Dichomitus squalens =

Species of fungus

Dichomitus squalens is a species of fungus belonging to the family Polyporaceae.

It is native to Eurasia and Northern America.
