= Skeletocutis subvulgaris =

Scientific classification
- Domain: Eukaryota
- Kingdom: Fungi
- Division: Basidiomycota
- Class: Agaricomycetes
- Order: Polyporales
- Family: Incrustoporiaceae
- Genus: Skeletocutis
- Species: S. subvulgaris

Binomial name
- Skeletocutis subvulgaris Y.C.Dai (1998)

Species of fungus

Skeletocutis subvulgaris is a species of poroid, white rot fungus in the family Polyporaceae. Found in China, it was described as a new species in 1998 by mycologist Yu-Chen Dai. It was named for its resemblance to Skeletocutis vulgaris. The type collection was made in Hongqi District, Jilin Province, where it was found growing on the rotting wood of Korean pine (Pinus koraiensis).

== Description ==
The fungus has a soft, thin, crust-like fruit body forming strips that measure 3–6 cm (1.2–2.4 in) long by 1–2 cm (0.4–0.8 in) wide; these strips are sometimes joined to make larger patches. The pore surface is whitish with small pores numbering 6–8 per millimetre. S. subvulgaris has a dimitic hyphal system. Some of the hyphae of the dissepiment edges (the tissue between the pores) is encrusted with spiny crystals. The skeletal hyphae have a distinct lumen, which helps distinguish this species from the similar S. vulgaris. Spores of S. subvulgaris are roughly cylindrical, thin walled and hyaline, and measure 3.1–4.1 by 1.1–1.6 μm.
