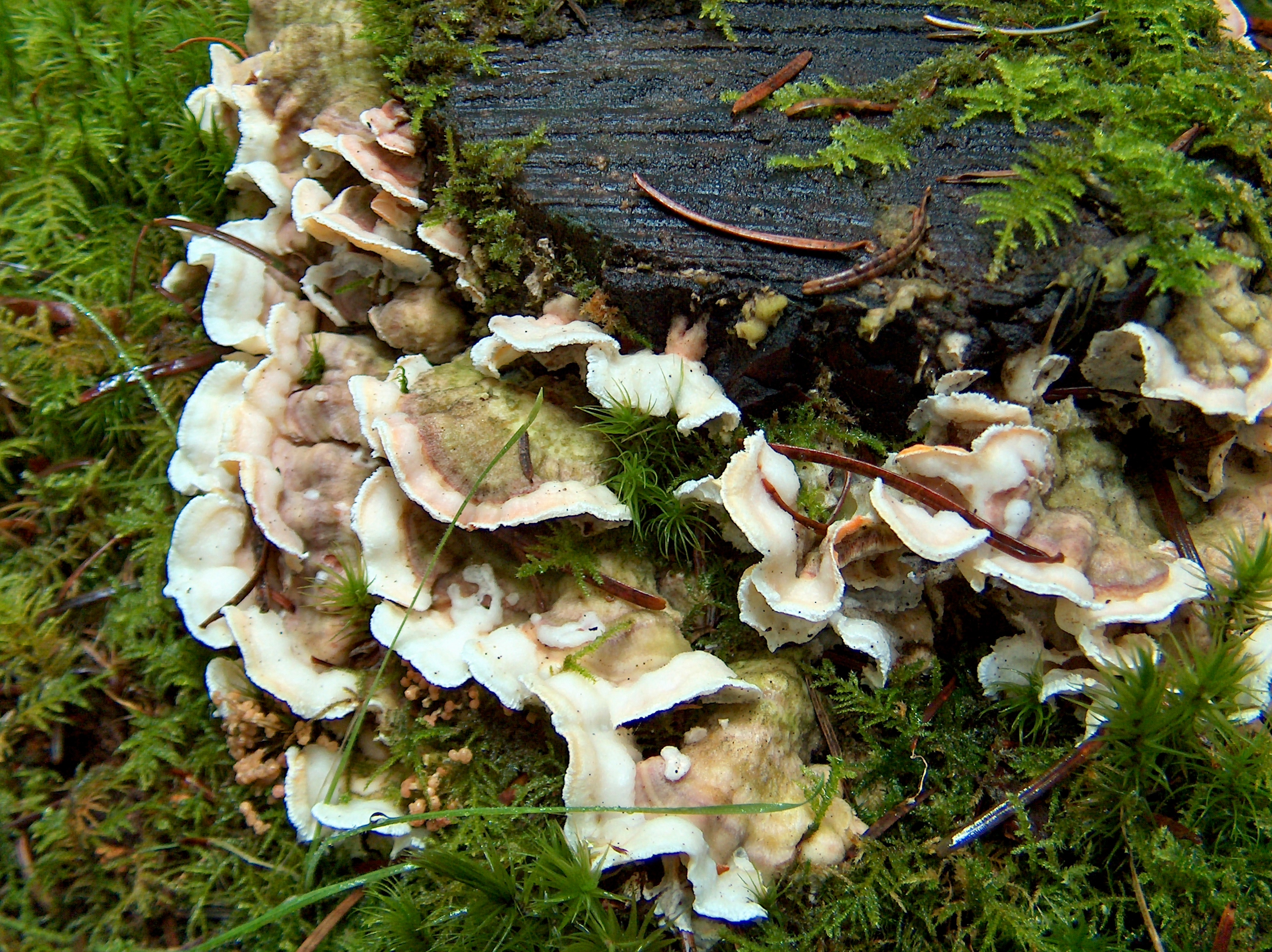

Scientific classification
- Kingdom: Fungi
- Division: Basidiomycota
- Class: Agaricomycetes
- Order: Polyporales
- Family: Incrustoporiaceae
- Genus: Skeletocutis
- Species: S. amorpha

Binomial name
- Skeletocutis amorpha (Fr.) Kotl. & Pouzar (1958)

Synonyms
- Polyporus amorphus Fr. (1815)

= Skeletocutis amorpha =

Species of fungus

Skeletocutis amorpha is a species of poroid fungus in the family Polyporaceae, and the type species of the genus Skeletocutis.

== Taxonomy ==
The fungus was first described as new to science in 1815 by Elias Magnus Fries as Polyporus amorphus. It has since acquired an extensive synonymy. Czech mycologists František Kotlába and Zdeněk Pouzar transferred it to the genus Skeletocutis in 1958.

== Description ==
Fruit bodies are effused-reflexed (crust-like with the edges curled out into rudimentary caps), or, more rarely, completely crust-like.

Its spores are allantoid (sausage-shaped), and measure 3–4.5 by 1.3–1.8 μm.

== Habitat and distribution ==
A widely distributed fungus, S. amorpha is found in Africa, Australia, China, and Europe. It causes a white rot in the dead wood of various species of the pine family, particularly pine, but also fir, larch, and spruce. Rarely, it grows on hardwoods such as alder, beech, and oak.
