= Grammothele =

Scientific classification
- Domain: Eukaryota
- Kingdom: Fungi
- Division: Basidiomycota
- Class: Agaricomycetes
- Order: Polyporales
- Family: Polyporaceae
- Genus: Grammothele; Berk. & M.A.Curtis (1868)

Type species
- Grammothele lineata Berk. & M.A.Curtis (1868)

Genus of fungi

Grammothele is a genus of poroid crust fungi in the family Polyporaceae.

== Taxonomy ==
Circumscribed by mycologists Miles Joseph Berkeley and Moses Ashley Curtis in 1868, they considered the genus to combine the characteristics of Hymenogramme and Grandinia. The generic name combines the Ancient Greek words γραμμή ("line" or "written character") and θηλή ("nipple").

Grammothele originally contained four species: G. polygramma, G. grisea, G. mappa, and the type, G. lineata. Modern taxonomic opinion now considers the first three of these to be synonymous with the latter.

== Species ==
As of June 2017, Index Fungorum accepts 19 species of Grammothele:

- Grammothele africana Ipulet & Ryvarden (2005) – Uganda
- Grammothele bambusicola Ryvarden (1984) – Nepal
- Grammothele boliviana Karasiński (2015) – Bolivia
- Grammothele brasilensis Ryvarden (2015) – Brazil
- Grammothele ceracea Rick (1938)
- Grammothele crocicreas (Ces.) Lloyd (1923)
- Grammothele crocistroma Lloyd (1924)
- Grammothele delicatula (Henn.) Ryvarden (1980) – China
- Grammothele denticulata Y.C.Dai & L.W.Zhou (2012) – China
- Grammothele effusoreflexa S.Banerjee (1936) – India
- Grammothele fuligo (Berk. & Broome) Ryvarden (1979)
- Grammothele glauca (Cooke) P.Roberts (2009)
- Grammothele hainanensis F.Wu & L.W.Zhou (2016) – China
- Grammothele lacticolor Ryvarden (2015) – Puerto Rico
- Grammothele lineata Berk. & M.A.Curtis (1868)
- Grammothele macrospora Ryvarden (1980)
- Grammothele ochracea Ryvarden (1982) – Thailand
- Grammothele pseudomappa P.H.B.Talbot (1951)
- Grammothele pulchella (Bres.) Ryvarden (1988)
- Grammothele quercina (Y.C.Dai) B.K.Cui & Hai J.Li (2013) – China
- Grammothele subargentea (Speg.) Rajchenb. (1983)
- Grammothele venezuelica Ryvarden (2015) – Venezuela
