= Trichaptum podocarpi =

Scientific classification
- Domain: Eukaryota
- Kingdom: Fungi
- Division: Basidiomycota
- Class: Agaricomycetes
- Order: Hymenochaetales
- Family: Hymenochaetaceae
- Genus: Trichaptum
- Species: T. podocarpi

Binomial name
- Trichaptum podocarpi Dai, Cui & Yuan (2009)

Species of fungus

Trichaptum podocarpi is a species of fungus in the order Hymenochaetales. It differs from species in its genus by having totally resupinate basidiocarps, distinctly long cystidia, and in its habitat on Podocarpus. It was first isolated from China.
