= Skeletocutis albocremea =

Scientific classification
- Domain: Eukaryota
- Kingdom: Fungi
- Division: Basidiomycota
- Class: Agaricomycetes
- Order: Polyporales
- Family: Incrustoporiaceae
- Genus: Skeletocutis
- Species: S. albocremea

Binomial name
- Skeletocutis albocremea A.David (1982)

Species of fungus

Skeletocutis albocremea is a species of poroid fungus in the family Polyporaceae. It was described as new to science by Alix David in 1982. It was reported as new to Russia in 2004.
