= Per Roger Lauritzen =

Norwegian non-fiction writer and editor

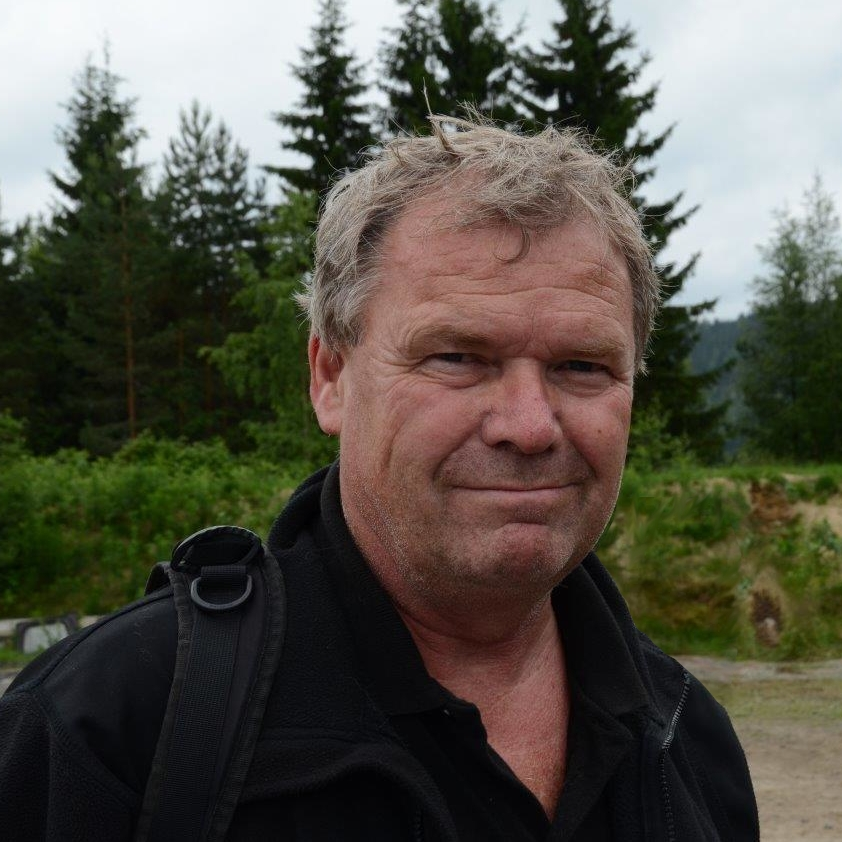
- Born: 1956 (age 69–70)
- Occupation: Non-fiction writer

Per Roger Lauritzen (born 1956) is a Norwegian non-fiction writer. He hails from Asker. He has worked as an editor for the Norwegian Trekking Association for more than thirty years, and has published more than fifty books. He was awarded Den norske friluftslivprisen in 2007, jointly with Leif Ryvarden.

== Bibliography ==
- Hyttene i Jotunheimen [The Cabins in Jotunheimen], 1997
- Hyttene på Hardangervidda [The Cabins at Hardangervidda], 1998
- Hyttene i Rondane [The Cabins in Rondane], 1999
- Sognefjellsveien [Sognefjells], 2004
- Grensesømmen [The Stitched Path], 2005
- Norges grense [Norway's border] 2005
- Hardangervidda [Hardanger plateau], 2007
- Norges beste fjellturer [Norway's best hikes], 2008
- Langs Glomma [Along the Glomma River], 2010
- Norske fjorder [Norwegian fjords], 2010
- Norges beste toppturer [Norway's best summit hikes], 2013
- Tusen padleturer [A thousand paddles], 2015
- Norske fyrstasjoner [Norwegian lighthouse stations], 2019
- Omveier - fjellturer i pionerenes fotspor [Detours - hiking in the footsteps of the pioneers], 2019
- Norges vakreste bilturer [Norway's most beautiful road trips (series)], 2021
- Norges beste utsikter [Norway's best views], 2021
