= Trichaptum imbricatum =

Scientific classification
- Domain: Eukaryota
- Kingdom: Fungi
- Division: Basidiomycota
- Class: Agaricomycetes
- Order: Hymenochaetales
- Family: Hymenochaetaceae
- Genus: Trichaptum
- Species: T. imbricatum

Binomial name
- Trichaptum imbricatum Y.C.Dai & B.K.Cui (2009)

Species of fungus

Trichaptum imbricatum is a species of fungus in the family Polyporaceae. It is distinguished by its imbricate basidiocarps, white to cream hymenophores, small and regular pores, and scattered and thin-walled cystidia. It was first isolated from China.
