= Skeletocutis biguttulata =

Scientific classification
- Domain: Eukaryota
- Kingdom: Fungi
- Division: Basidiomycota
- Class: Agaricomycetes
- Order: Polyporales
- Family: Incrustoporiaceae
- Genus: Skeletocutis
- Species: S. biguttulata

Binomial name
- Skeletocutis biguttulata (Romell) Niemelä (1998)

Synonyms
- Poria biguttulata Romell (1932)

Species of fungus

Skeletocutis biguttulata is a species of poroid fungus in the family Polyporaceae. It was first described scientifically by Swedish mycologist Lars Romell in 1932. Tuomo Niemelä redescribed and illustrated the fungus in 1998, and explained that collections of this fungus had previously been attributed to the related Skeletocutis subincarnata. S. biguttulata may be distinguished from the latter fungus by its biguttulate spores (containing two oil droplets), more regularly arranged pores, and the cracking pore surface seen in older specimens.

It has been collected in Fennoscandia, Estonia, France, Poland, and Russia.
