= Skeletocutis alutacea =

Scientific classification
- Domain: Eukaryota
- Kingdom: Fungi
- Division: Basidiomycota
- Class: Agaricomycetes
- Order: Polyporales
- Family: Incrustoporiaceae
- Genus: Skeletocutis
- Species: S. alutacea

Binomial name
- Skeletocutis alutacea (J.Lowe) Jean Keller (1979)

Synonyms
- Poria alutacea J.Lowe (1946); Fibuloporia alutacea (J.Lowe) M.P.Christ. (1960); Incrustoporia alutacea (J.Lowe) D.A.Reid (1969); Fibroporia alutacea (J.Lowe) Bondartseva (1972)

Species of fungus

Skeletocutis alutacea is a species of poroid fungus in the family Polyporaceae. It was described as new to science in 1946 by American mycologist Josiah Lincoln Lowe as Poria alutacea. Jean Keller transferred it to the genus Skeletocutis in 1979. It is found in the United States and Canada, in Europe, and New Zealand, where it causes a white rot in various woody substrates.

The basidia of S. alutacea are club-shaped, measuring 9–12 by 4–5 μm. Its spores are hyaline, smooth, cylindrical, straight to slightly curved, and measure 2.5–3.5 by 1–1.5 μm.
