= Trichaptum perenne =

Scientific classification
- Domain: Eukaryota
- Kingdom: Fungi
- Division: Basidiomycota
- Class: Agaricomycetes
- Order: Hymenochaetales
- Family: Hymenochaetaceae
- Genus: Trichaptum
- Species: T. perenne

Binomial name
- Trichaptum perenne Dai, Cui & Yuan (2009)

Species of fungus

Trichaptum perenne is a species of fungus in the order Hymenochaetales. It differs from species in its genus by its perennial and pileate habit, its large pores and dissepiments, and oblong, ellipsoid basidiospores. It was first isolated from China.
