= Skeletocutis nothofagi =

Scientific classification
- Kingdom: Fungi
- Division: Basidiomycota
- Class: Agaricomycetes
- Order: Polyporales
- Family: Incrustoporiaceae
- Genus: Skeletocutis
- Species: S. nothofagi

Binomial name
- Skeletocutis nothofagi Rajchenb. (2001)

Species of fungus

Skeletocutis nothofagi is a rare species of poroid crust fungus in the family Polyporaceae that is found in South America. It has been proposed for inclusion in the IUCN Red List of Threatened Species due to its highly restricted distribution and rare occurrence.

== Taxonomy ==
Skeletocutis nothofagi was described as a new species in 2001 by Argentinian mycologist Mario Rajchenberg. The holotype collection was made in Tierra del Fuego in 1999, where the fungus was found on a fallen branch of Nothofagus betuloides. The specific epithet nothofagi refers to this host.

== Description ==
Fruit bodies of the fungus grow initially as small, roundish bodies that may later coalesce, reaching sizes of up to 10 cm (3.9 in) by 3 cm (1.2 in) by 0.5 cm (0.2 in) thick. The colour of the pore surface is white to cream, with the pore tubes yellowing somewhat after drying. The sterile margin is cream coloured, and has a felty texture that is more prominent if viewed with a hand lens. The pores are circular to wavy in outline, and number between 2.5 and 4 per millimetre.

The fungus has a monomitic hyphal system, and the generative hyphae have clamps. Spores are somewhat allantoid (sausage-shaped) to cylindrical, measuring 4.5–5.5 by 1.7–2 μm.
