= Skeletocutis falsipileata =

Scientific classification
- Kingdom: Fungi
- Division: Basidiomycota
- Class: Agaricomycetes
- Order: Polyporales
- Family: Incrustoporiaceae
- Genus: Skeletocutis
- Species: S. falsipileata

Binomial name
- Skeletocutis falsipileata (Corner) T.Hatt. (2002)

Synonyms
- Tyromyces falsipileatus Corner (1992)

Species of fungus

Skeletocutis falsipileata is a species of poroid crust fungus in the family Polyporaceae. Found in Malaysia, it was first described by E.J.H. Corner in 1992 as a species of Tyromyces. Tsutomu Hattori transferred it to Skeletocutis in 2002.
