= Skeletocutis diluta =

Scientific classification
- Domain: Eukaryota
- Kingdom: Fungi
- Division: Basidiomycota
- Class: Agaricomycetes
- Order: Polyporales
- Family: Incrustoporiaceae
- Genus: Skeletocutis
- Species: S. diluta

Binomial name
- Skeletocutis diluta (Rajchenb.) A.David & Rajchenb. (1992)

Synonyms
- Skeletocutis nivea var. diluta Rajchenb. (1983)

Species of fungus

Skeletocutis diluta is a species of poroid crust fungus in the family Polyporaceae. It was first described by Mario Rajchenberg in 1983 as a variety of Skeletocutis nivea. Rajchenberg and Alex David promoted the taxon to independent species status in 1992. The type specimen was collected in Puerto Esperanza, Misiones (Argentina), where it was found growing on Pinus taeda logs in a subtropical forest. It has since been found in Gabon. Skeletocutis diluta has effused-reflexed fruit bodies, meaning they are crust-like with a margin that is extended and bent backwards. It has small allantoid (sausage-shaped) spores measuring 3.1–3.5 by 0.5–0.8 μm. It features a dimitic hyphal system (containing both generative and skeletal hyphae), but the skeletal hyphae dissolve in solution of potassium hydroxide.
