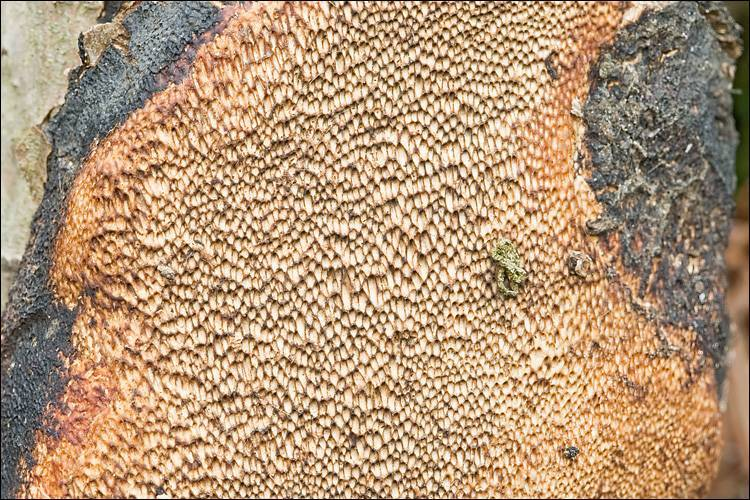
- Dichomitus campestris

Scientific classification
- Domain: Eukaryota
- Kingdom: Fungi
- Division: Basidiomycota
- Class: Agaricomycetes
- Order: Polyporales
- Family: Polyporaceae
- Genus: Dichomitus; D.A.Reid (1965)

Type species
- Dichomitus squalens (P.Karst.) D.A.Reid (1965)

= Dichomitus =

Genus of fungi

Dichomitus is a genus of poroid crust fungi in the family Polyporaceae. It was circumscribed by English mycologist Derek Reid in 1965.

== Description ==
Dichomitus fungi have fruit bodies that are either crust-like, or form caps that largely lack a stipe. The upper surface of the fruit body is typically white to blackish in colour, while the pore surface ranges from cream to pale greyish. The inner tissue of the fruit body, the context, is white to cream.

Dichomitus features a dimitic hyphal system (containing both generative and skeletal hyphae).

== Species ==
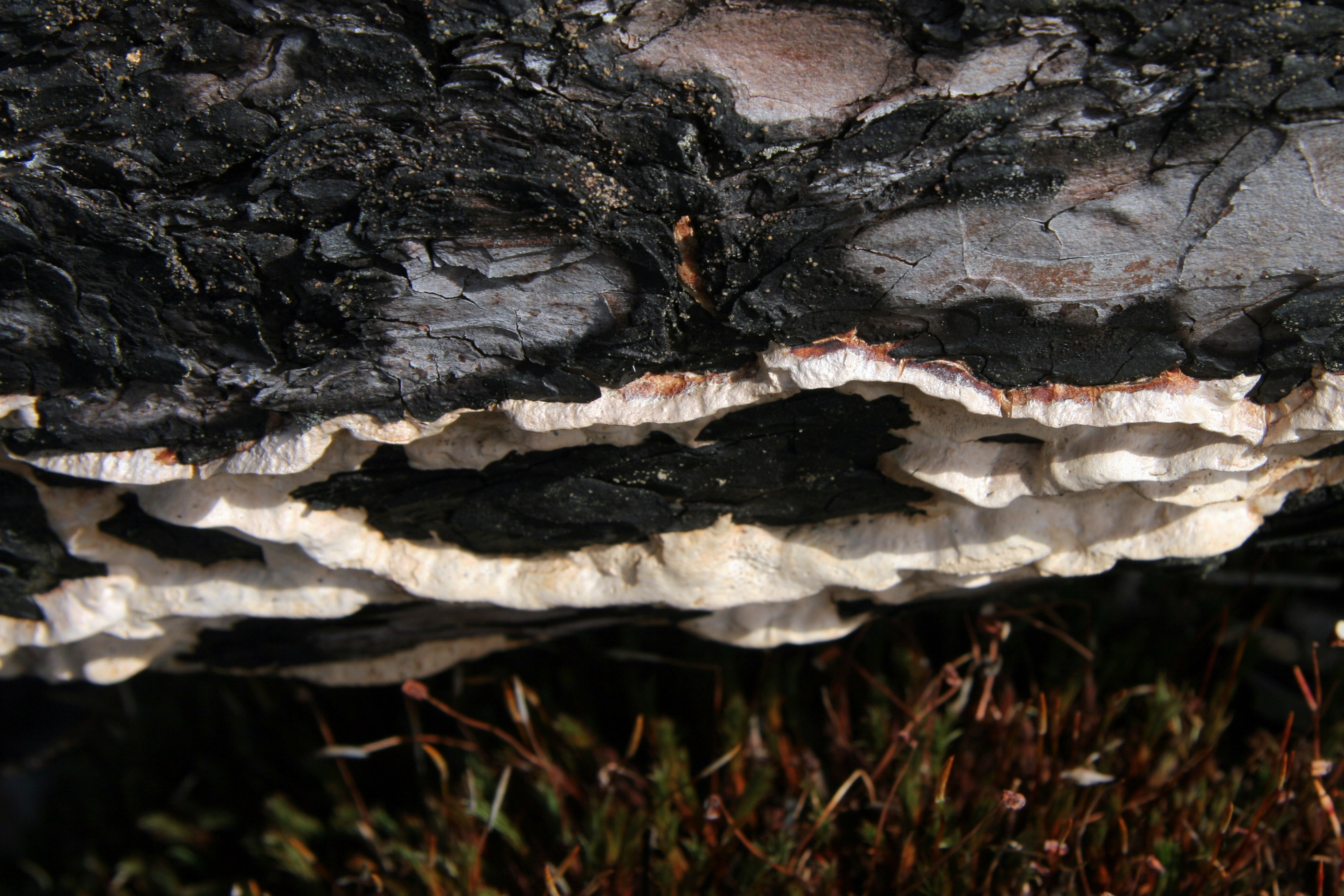
Dichomitus squalens

As of June 2017, Index Fungorum accepts 24 species of Dichomitus:

- Dichomitus affixus (Corner) T.Hatt. (2002)
- Dichomitus amazonicus Gomes-Silva, Ryvarden & Gibertoni (2012) – Brazil
- Dichomitus amygdalinus (Berk. & Ravenel) Ryvarden (1977)
- Dichomitus anoectoporus (Berk. & M.A.Curtis) Ryvarden (1984)
- Dichomitus campestris (Quél.) Domanski & Orlicz (1966) – Europe
- Dichomitus citricremeus Masuka & Ryvarden (1999) – Africa
- Dichomitus costaricensis Ryvarden (2013) – Costa Rica
- Dichomitus cylindrosporus Ryvarden (2007) – Belize
- Dichomitus deviatus Ipulet & Ryvarden (2005) – Africa
- Dichomitus ecuadorensis Ryvarden (2010)
- Dichomitus efibulatus A.M.Ainsw. & Ryvarden (2008) – Great Britain
- Dichomitus epitephrus (Berk.) Ryvarden (1984)
- Dichomitus eucalypti Ryvarden (1985) – Australia
- Dichomitus grandisporus Aime & Ryvarden (2007) – Guyana
- Dichomitus hubeiensis Hai J.Li & B.K.Cui (2013) – China
- Dichomitus kirkii Masuka & Ryvarden (1999) – Africa; China
- Dichomitus leucoplacus (Berk.) Ryvarden (1977)
- Dichomitus mexicanus (Ryvarden) Ryvarden (2007)
- Dichomitus newhookii P.K.Buchanan & Ryvarden (2000) – New Zealand
- Dichomitus papuanus Quanten (1996) – Papua New Guinea
- Dichomitus pendulus Læssøe & Ryvarden (2010)
- Dichomitus perennis Ryvarden (2007) – Belize
- Dichomitus sinuolatus H.S.Yuan (2013) – China
- Dichomitus squalens (P.Karst.) D.A.Reid (1965) – Europe; Canada
