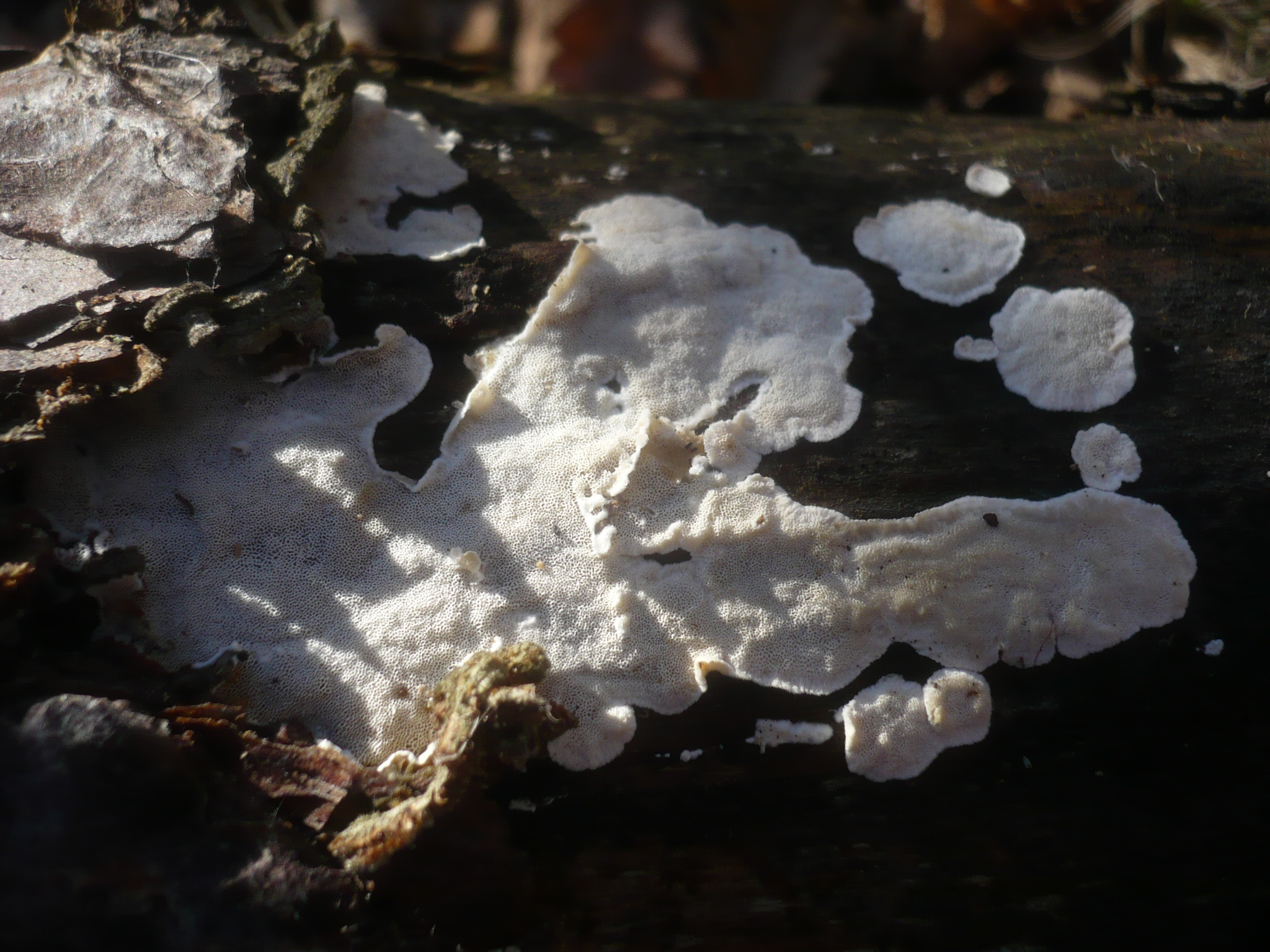

Scientific classification
- Domain: Eukaryota
- Kingdom: Fungi
- Division: Basidiomycota
- Class: Agaricomycetes
- Order: Polyporales
- Family: Incrustoporiaceae
- Genus: Skeletocutis
- Species: S. carneogrisea

Binomial name
- Skeletocutis carneogrisea A.David (1982)

= Skeletocutis carneogrisea =

Species of fungus

Skeletocutis carneogrisea is a species of poroid crust fungus in the family Polyporaceae. It was described as new to science by Alix David in 1982. It is found in Europe, South America, and China.
