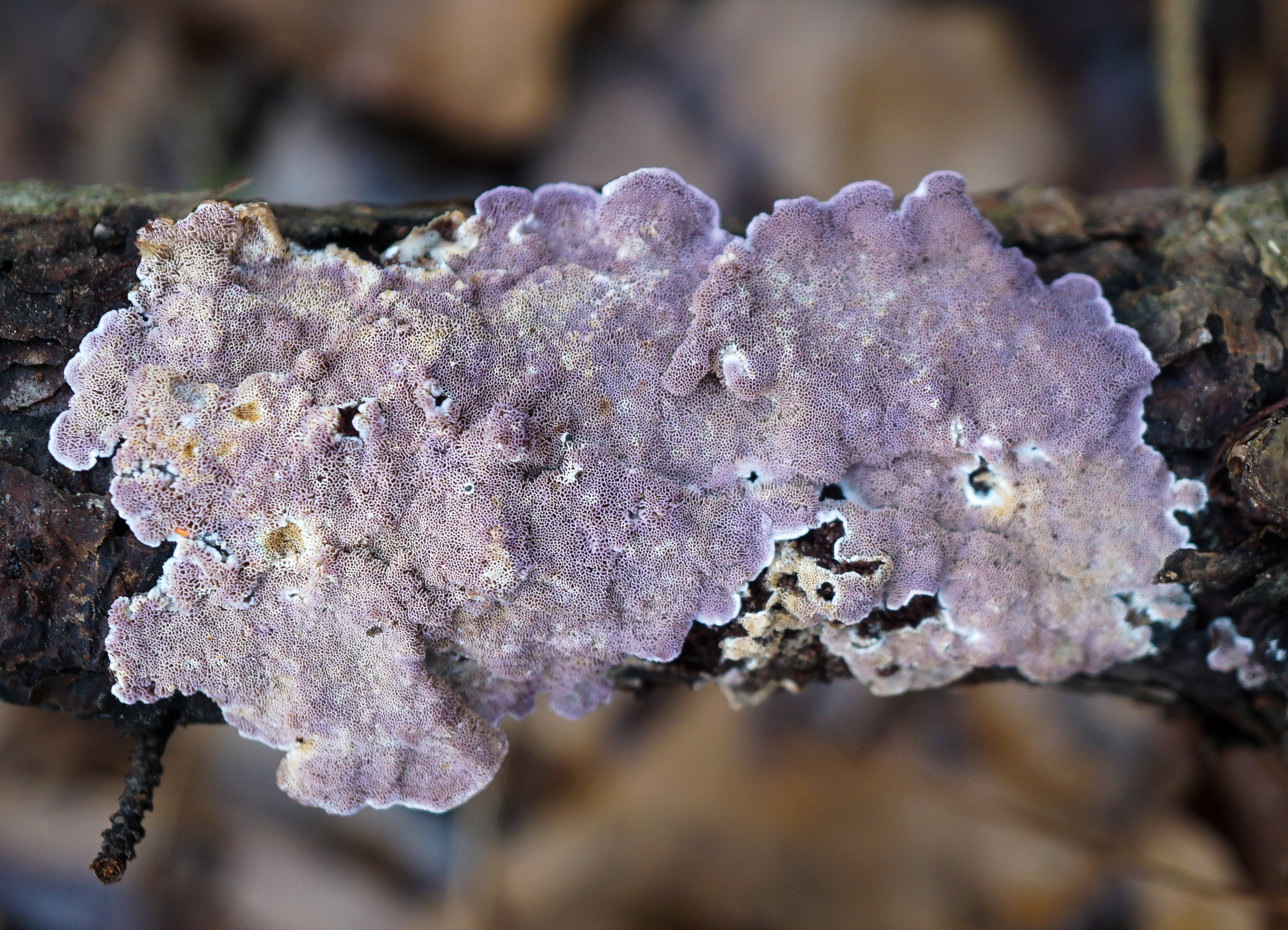

Scientific classification
- Kingdom: Fungi
- Division: Basidiomycota
- Class: Agaricomycetes
- Order: Polyporales
- Family: Incrustoporiaceae
- Genus: Skeletocutis
- Species: S. lilacina

Binomial name
- Skeletocutis lilacina A.David & Jean Keller (1984)

= Skeletocutis lilacina =

Species of fungus

Skeletocutis lilacina is a species of poroid fungus in the family Polyporaceae. Originally found in Switzerland, it was described as a new species in 1984 by mycologists Alix David and Jean Keller. It has also been reported from North America.
