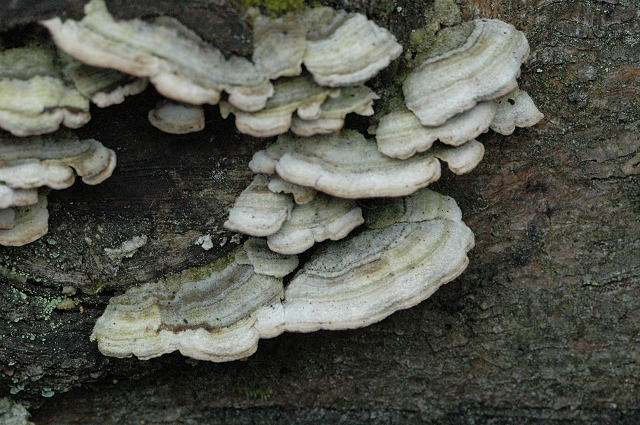

Scientific classification
- Kingdom: Fungi
- Division: Basidiomycota
- Class: Agaricomycetes
- Order: Hymenochaetales
- Family: Hymenochaetaceae
- Genus: Trichaptum
- Species: T. abietinum

Binomial name
- Trichaptum abietinum (Dicks.) Ryvarden (1972)

Synonyms
- Boletus abietinus Dicks. (1793)

= Trichaptum abietinum =

Trichaptum abietinum Mycological characteristics
- Pores on hymenium
- Cap is flat
- Hymenium attachment is not applicable
- Lacks a stipe
- Spore print is white
- Ecology is saprotrophic
- Edibility is inedible

Trichaptum abietinum is a species of poroid fungus in the order Hymenochaetales. It is saprophytic, growing from dead conifer wood.

The white-gray cap is 1–4 cm wide and usually no more than 0.5 cm thick, shelved and fanlike, with brownish and leathery flesh. The spores are white, cylindrical, and smooth.

The species is inedible.

Similar species include Trichaptum biforme, Bjerkandera adusta, and Trametes versicolor.
