= Skeletocutis fimbriata =

Scientific classification
- Domain: Eukaryota
- Kingdom: Fungi
- Division: Basidiomycota
- Class: Agaricomycetes
- Order: Polyporales
- Family: Incrustoporiaceae
- Genus: Skeletocutis
- Species: S. fimbriata

Binomial name
- Skeletocutis fimbriata Juan Li & Y.C.Dai (2008)

Species of fungus

Skeletocutis fimbriata is a species of poroid fungus in the family Polyporaceae. Found in China, it was described as new to science in 2008. The holotype collection was made in the Shennongjia nature reserve in northwestern Hubei province, where it was found growing on rotting angiosperm wood. The fungus is distinguished from the other Skeletocutis species by its narrow spores, and its coarsely fimbriate margin on the fruit bodies. The specific epithet fimbriata refers to this latter characteristic.
