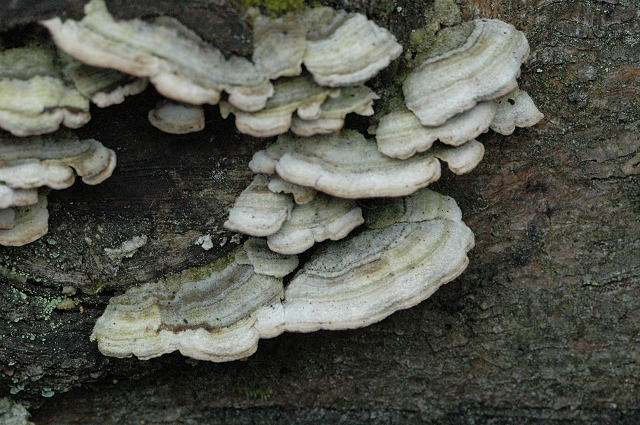
- Trichaptum abietinum

Scientific classification
- Domain: Eukaryota
- Kingdom: Fungi
- Division: Basidiomycota
- Class: Agaricomycetes
- Order: Hymenochaetales
- Family: Hymenochaetaceae
- Genus: Trichaptum; Murrill (1904)

Type species
- Trichaptum trichomallum (Berk. & Mont.) Murrill

Synonyms
- Hirschioporus Donk (1933); Poriodontia Parmasto (1982)

= Trichaptum =

Genus of fungi

Trichaptum is a genus of poroid fungi. The genus was circumscribed by American mycologist William Alphonso Murrill in 1904. Formerly classified in the family Polyporaceae, several molecular studies have shown that the genus belongs to the order Hymenochaetales.

== Species ==
- Trichaptum abietinum
- Trichaptum agglutinatum
- Trichaptum album
- Trichaptum basifuscum
- Trichaptum biforme
- Trichaptum brastagii
- Trichaptum bulbocystidiatum
- Trichaptum byssogenum
- Trichaptum ceraceicutis
- Trichaptum deviatum
- Trichaptum favoloides
- Trichaptum flavum
- Trichaptum fumosoavellaneum
- Trichaptum fuscoviolaceum
- Trichaptum griseofuscum
- Trichaptum imbricatum
- Trichaptum jackiae
- Trichaptum lacunosum
- Trichaptum laricinum
- Trichaptum molestum
- Trichaptum montanum
- Trichaptum parvulum
- Trichaptum perenne
- Trichaptum perpusillum
- Trichaptum perrottetii
- Trichaptum podocarpi
- Trichaptum polycystidiatum
- Trichaptum sector
- Trichaptum strigosum
- Trichaptum subchartaceum
- Trichaptum suberosum
- Trichaptum trichomallum
- Trichaptum variabilis
- Trichaptum vinaceobrunneum
