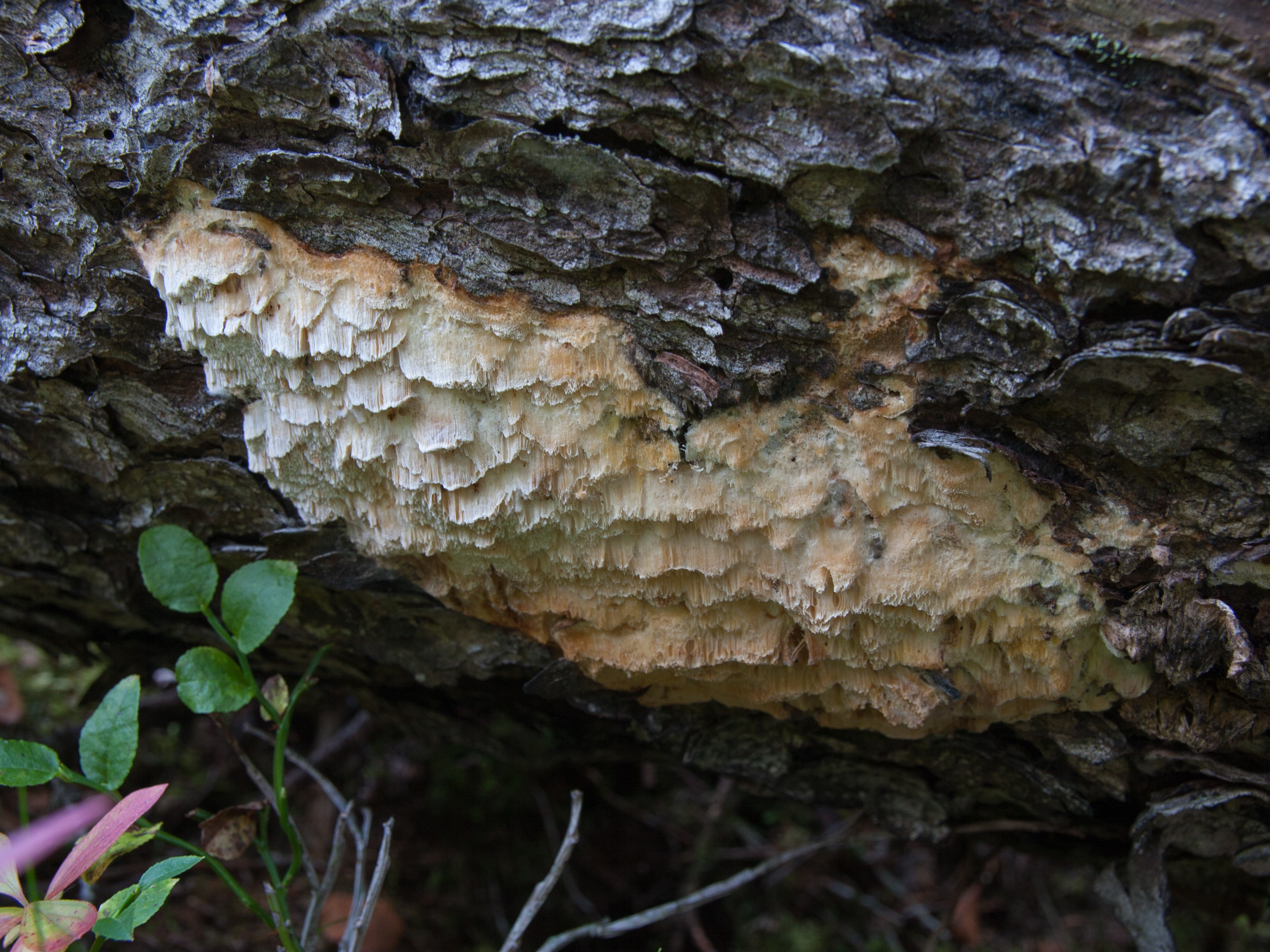

Scientific classification
- Kingdom: Fungi
- Division: Basidiomycota
- Class: Agaricomycetes
- Order: Polyporales
- Family: Incrustoporiaceae
- Genus: Tyromyces
- Species: T. odorus

Binomial name
- Tyromyces odorus (Peck ex Sacc.) Zmitr., 2018

= Tyromyces odorus =

Species of fungus

Tyromyces odorus is a species of wood-growing "shelf fungus" belonging to the family Incrustoporiaceae. It was formerly placed in the closely related genus Skeletocutis, and before that in the more distantly related Antrodira of family Fomitopsidaceae; when it was first scientifically described, it was included in the wastebasket genus "Poria".

A fungus growing on a pine (Pinus) log was recorded as food of the little-known pleasing fungus beetle Haematochiton elateroides, and tentatively identified as T.odorus, but under the erroneous assumption that it a species of Antrodia. Whether the fungus in question was T.odorus, an Antrodia sensu stricto, or belonged to a related genus such as Skeletocutis, is not resolvable without further records of the beetle.

Synonyms:

- Antrodia odora (Sacc.) Gilb. & Ryvarden, 1985
- Poria odora Sacc., 1888
- Polyporus odorus Peck, 1885 (nom.illeg.)
- Skeletocutis odora (Sacc.) Ginns, 1984
- Skeletocutis odora f. investiens Zmitr. & Malysheva, 2015
