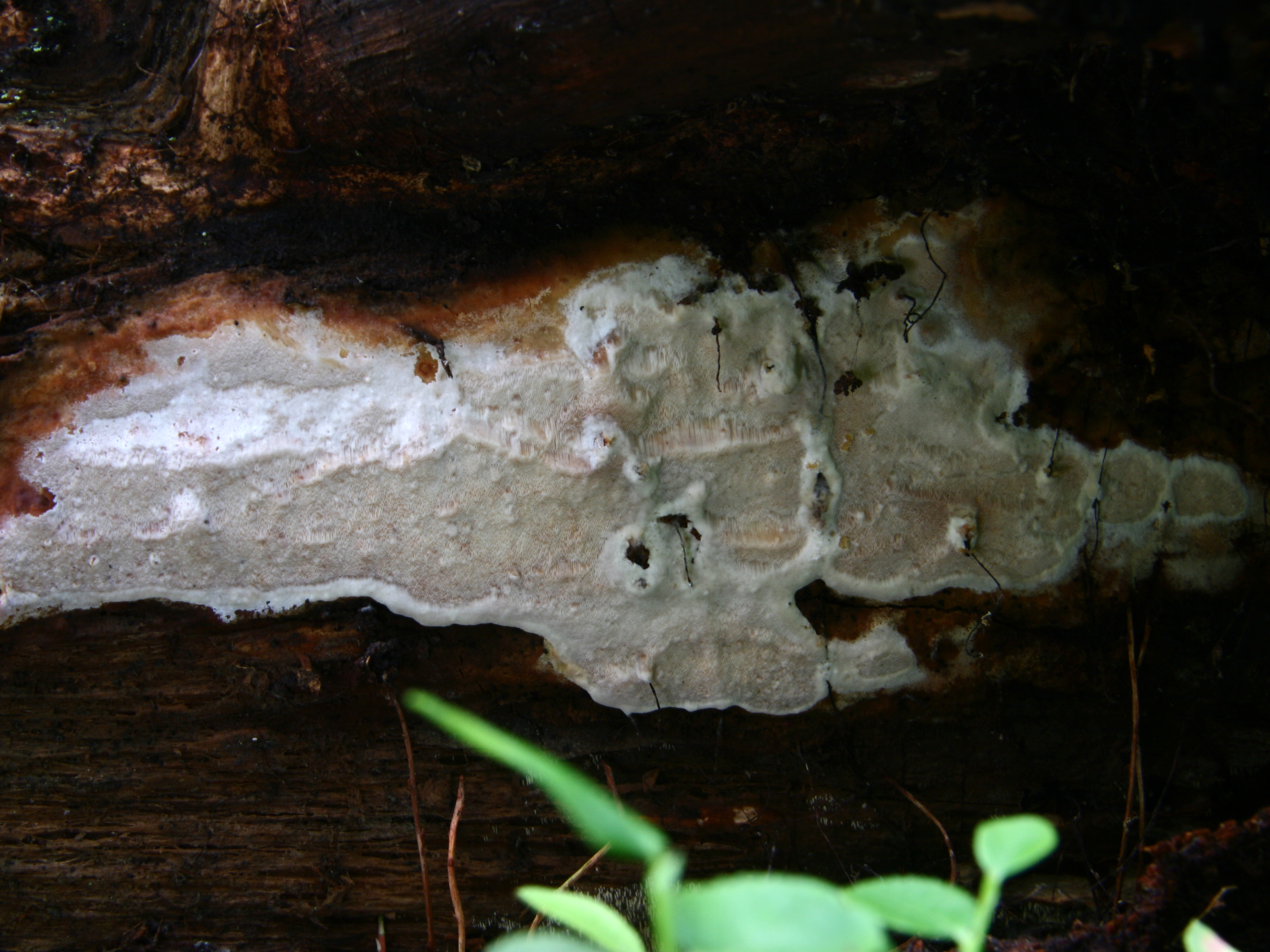

Scientific classification
- Domain: Eukaryota
- Kingdom: Fungi
- Division: Basidiomycota
- Class: Agaricomycetes
- Order: Polyporales
- Family: Incrustoporiaceae
- Genus: Skeletocutis
- Species: S. stellae

Binomial name
- Skeletocutis stellae (Pilát) Jean Keller

= Skeletocutis stellae =

Species of fungus

Skeletocutis stellae is a species of fungus belonging to the family Polyporaceae.

It is native to Eurasia and Northern America. S. stellae is found growing on spruce and pine, mostly in old-growth, undisturbed forest habitats. (Kotiranta & Niemelä 1996, Niemelä 1998).
