= Cream (colour) =

Colour

Colour coordinates
- Hex triplet: #FFFDD0
- sRGB^{B} (r, g, b): (255, 253, 208)
- HSV (h, s, v): (57°, 18%, 100%)
- CIELCh_{uv} (L, C, h): (98, 33, 84°)
- Source: Maerz and Paul
- ISCC–NBS descriptor: Light yellow green
- B: Normalized to [0–255] (byte)

Cream is the color of the cream produced by cattle grazing on natural pasture with plants rich in yellow carotenoid pigments, some of which are incorporated into the fresh milk (specifically, the butterfat). This gives a yellow tone to otherwise-white milk at higher fat concentrations. Cream is the pastel colour of yellow, much as pink is to red. By mixing yellow and white, cream can be produced.

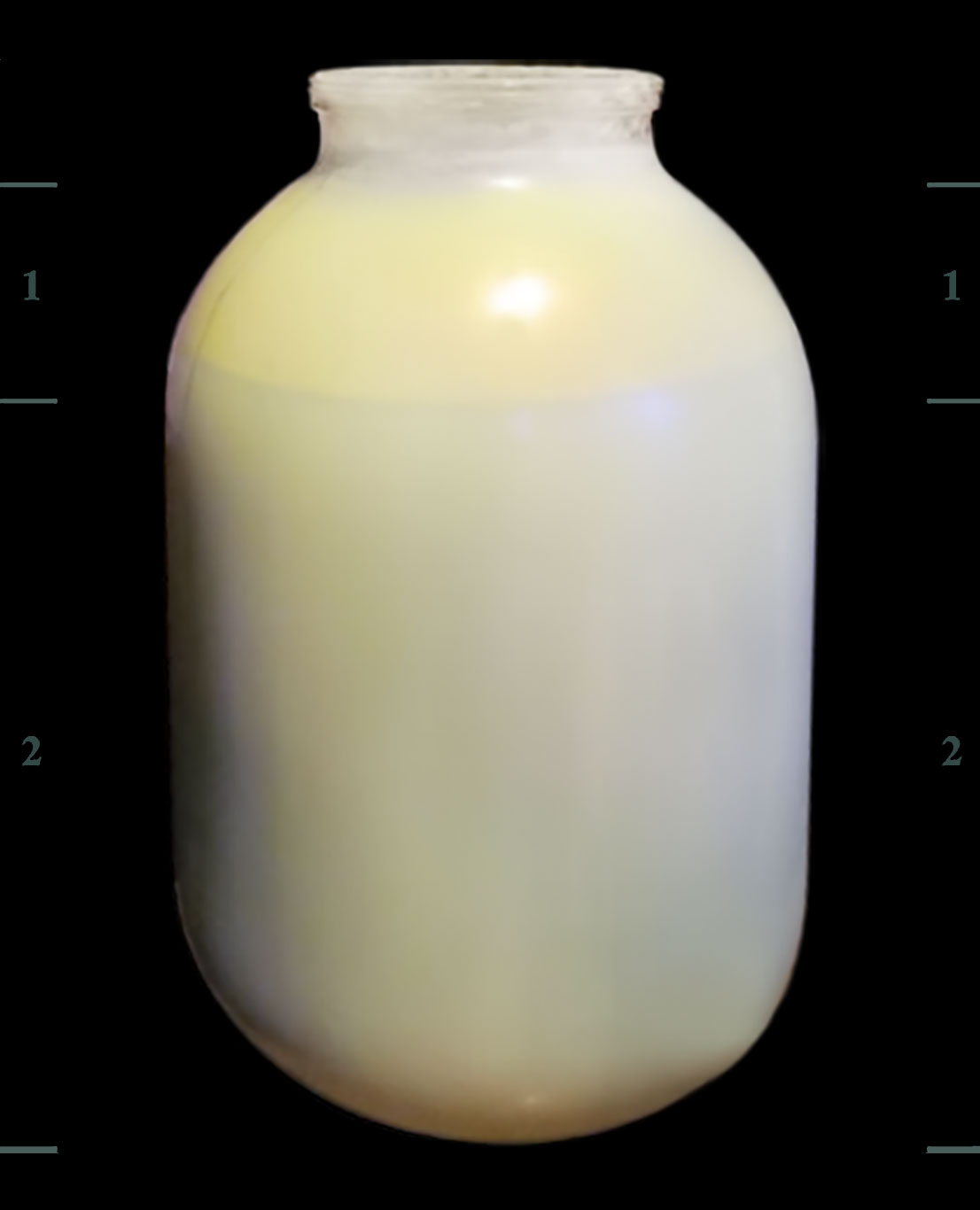
A jar containing milk and heavy cream

The first recorded use of cream as a colour name in English was in 1590.

== In nature ==
Birds

- The Cream-coloured courser
- The cream-coloured woodpecker

Mammals

- The cream-coloured giant squirrel

== In human culture ==
=== Art ===
- Cream is used as a skin tone in some forms of art, mostly anime. It is also used to describe the general skin tone of East and South East Asia.

=== Clothing ===
- Men's white tuxedo jackets are usually a shade of cream or ivory to better stand out against the white dress shirt.

=== Interior design ===
- The colour cream is widely used as one of the off-white colours in interior design.

=== Sports ===
- The Indiana University Bloomington Hoosiers' official colours are cream and crimson.
- The University of Nebraska–Lincoln Cornhuskers' official colours are scarlet and cream.
- The University of Oklahoma Sooners' official colours are crimson and cream.
- Club América's original colours were cream and blue, before switching to yellow and blue.
- Universitario de Deportes' official colours are cream and burgundy.
- Sport Club Corinthians Paulista's first uniform featured cream shirts before switching definitively to white shirts (due to a washing up error), which were kept since then.

== See also ==
- List of colours
- Tints and shades
