= Leif Ryvarden =

Norwegian mycologist (born 1935)

- Born: 9 August 1935 (age 91); Bergen
- Education: Norwegian Institute of Technology; University of Oslo
- Known for: Systematics and ecology of wood-inhabiting fungi worldwide, especially in Africa, Europe and tropical America
- Awards: See text
- Scientific career
- Fields: Mycology
- Workplaces: University of Oslo
- Author abbrev. (botany): Ryvarden

Leif Randulff Ryvarden (born 9 August 1935) is a Norwegian mycologist.

== Early life and education ==
Leif Ryvarden was born in Bergen as a son of Einar Norberg Johansen (1900–1959) and Hjørdis Randulff (1912–1975).

He finished his secondary education at Berg in 1954 and took basic military education from 1957 to 1958 and in 1956 he changed his last name from Johansen to Ryvarden. He studied chemistry at the Norwegian Institute of Technology. In 1961 he ran for election as chairman of Student Society in Trondheim, albeit unsuccessfully. In 1963, he graduated with the siv.ing. degree , and later majored in botany at the University of Oslo, taking a cand.real. degree. He also studied in London from 1971 to 1972, a stay that sparked his interest in mycology.

== Academic career ==
Ryvarden conducted field work in about eighty countries, mostly in a tropical environment. From 1965 to 1966, he was employed as research assistant at the Norwegian Institute of Technology, from 1966 to 1972 as a research fellow at the University of Oslo and then associate professor. He was promoted to professor at the University of Oslo in 1992, and served until 2002. He is currently a professor emeritus. By 2012, Ryvarden had published more than 300 academic works.

He has chaired the Norwegian Botanical Association. He has been an editorial board member of the journals Neotropica, Plant Systematics and Evolution and Mycological Progress, and a council member of the Research Council of Norway department for sciences.

== Personal life ==
In 1961 he married teacher Ingbjørg Alise Eia Barstad.

== Popular and organizational contributions ==
Ryvarden was also noted for his contributions in popular science, including writing for children. For this, some criticized him for simplifying the subject—Ryvarden replied that one should "not take oneself too solemnly". His main work in the children's category was Norsk naturleksikon for barn, a twelve-volume natural science encyclopedia for children. Other popular works include the 1983 Norges nasjonalparker, describing the national parks of Norway, and Norges isbreer, co-published with Bjørn Wold in 1991, about the glaciers of Norway. Together with Per Roger Lauritzen he published Fjellnorge (2001), describing the mountains of Norway, and KystNorge (2006) about coastal Norway. Both works spanned three volumes. Ryvarden also wrote guides on mushrooms, berries, herbs and fauna.

Ryvarden was a member of the board from 1972 to 1985, and deputy leader since 1982, of the Norwegian Mountain Touring Association. He was a prolific writer for the Norwegian Mountain Touring Association Yearbook as well as their magazine Fjell og Vidde. He was also a member of the board of Greenpeace Norway for a year and a half, but resigned from this position in 1992 due to disagreements over the organization's strategy and priorities. Ryvarden especially criticized their perceived bias towards saving an amount of minke whale. He cited that all species are equally important, and also reminded that there were other pressing environmental issues in Norway at that time. As Ryvarden left, there were no longer any Norwegian citizens on the board of Greenpeace Norway. Later, Ryvarden publicly supported Bjørn Økern, who was fired as leader of Greenpeace Norway in 1992.

== Recognition ==
Ryvarden is a member of the Norwegian Academy of Science and Letters. Ryvarden holds an honorary degree at the University of Gothenburg, and since 2008 the National University of Córdoba. He is also an honorary member of the Mycological Society of America.

He won the Brage Prize in 1998 in the category non-fiction, for the book Er det liv, er det sopp which he co-wrote with Klaus Høiland. In 2002 he was given the University of Oslo Research Promotion Award. In 2007, Ryvarden and Lauritzen were awarded the Norwegian Outdoors Prize for their books. He has also received a prize from the Ministry of the Environment. A special issue of the scientific journal Kurtziana was dedicated to Ryvarden "in honour of his devotion to South American mycology". Fungal taxa named in his honour include the polypore genera Leifiporia and Ryvardenia, and the species Daedalea ryvardeniana.

Awards
Preceded by Anne Wichstrøm	Recipient of the Brage Prize for prose 1998 (with Klaus Høiland)	Succeeded by Torbjørn Færøvik
