= Indicator fungi in forest protection, Finland =

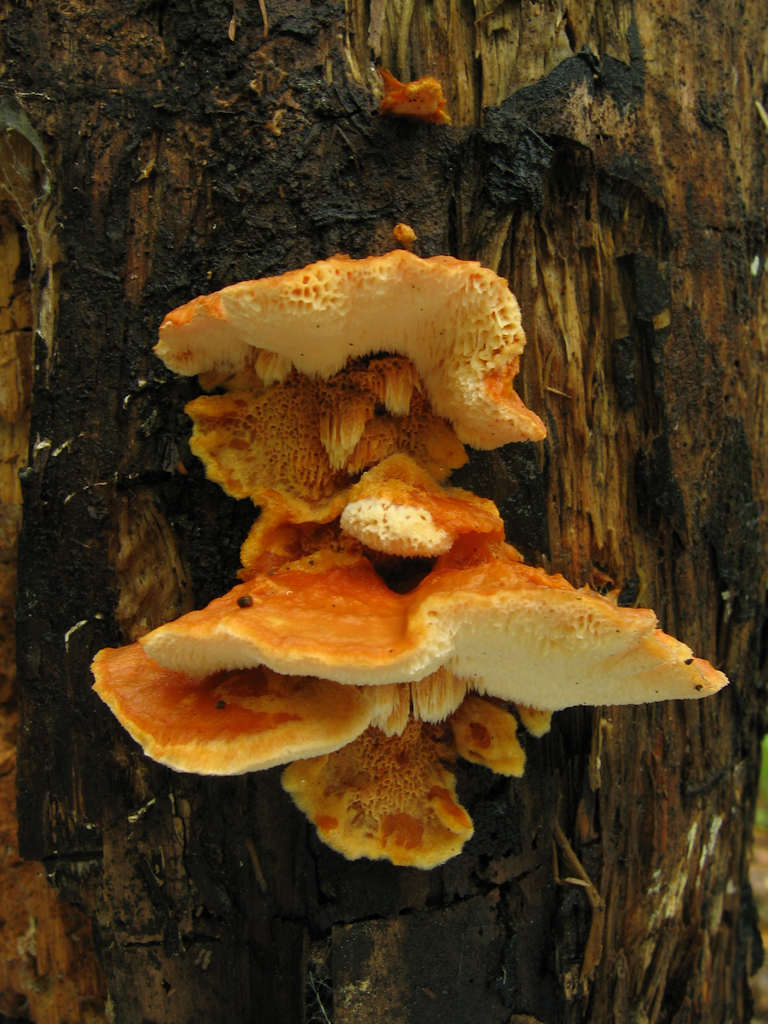
Pycnoporellus fulgens, an old spruce forest indicator polypore

In Finland, Kotiranta and Niemelä (1993, 1996) introduced a widely used method for comparing the conservation values of different forest areas, based on the observation that certain wood-rotting fungi are very sensitive to the impact of human activities on forest ecosystems. Such species are slow to return to areas from where they have disappeared, so their presence is evidence of a long continuity in forest ecosystems.

== Kotiranta-Niemelä polypore indicators ==
Kotiranta and Niemelä divide the indicator species into two categories: old forest species predominantly found in old natural forests (20 species); and virgin forest species (13 species), which are almost totally restricted to undisturbed old-growth forests with a long ecological continuum stretching way back into the past. Separate species lists are available for spruce (Picea abies) dominated forests and for pine (Pinus sylvestris) forests. Old spruce and pine dominated forests include smaller amounts of various tree species (e.g. Betula spp., Populus tremula, Salix caprea) which, too, are an important element of forest structure. Therefore, some fungi specialized to grow on these substrates are also included in the lists of indicators. Special attention has been paid to fungi growing on the so-called kelo trees.

Indicator fungi were selected to the list keeping in mind that they should not be too difficult to identify, and should not include taxonomic pitfalls. To minimize the effects of accidental single omissions of observations, the number of the so-called indicator species was kept fairly high. Most of these indicator fungi are polypores (bracket fungi).

When assessing and comparing different forest areas, inventories are made in each area separately. Every old-forest species present is then given a numerical value of 1, and every virgin-forest species a value of 2.

The total sums of these numbers can be used as reference values for each area as follows:

- 10–19 Valuable areas from a conservation point of view,
- 20–29 Very valuable areas,
- 30–46 Exceptionally valuable areas.

This rating is fairly strict. Forests managed according to standard practices in Finland usually get a numerical value of 0, or seldom 1–4. These lists of indicator species are widely used in Finland while establishing or enlarging national parks and other protected forests, especially by the governmental Forest and Park Service.

=== Indicator species, spruce dominated forests ===
==== Old forest species ====
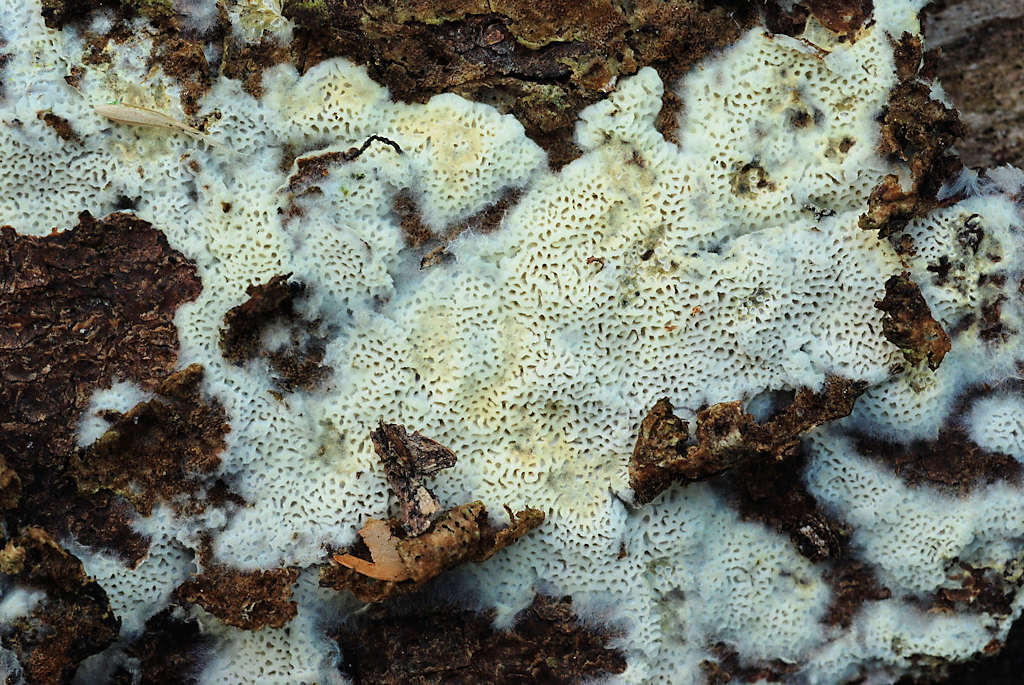
Anomoporia bombycina, an old spruce forest indicator polypore

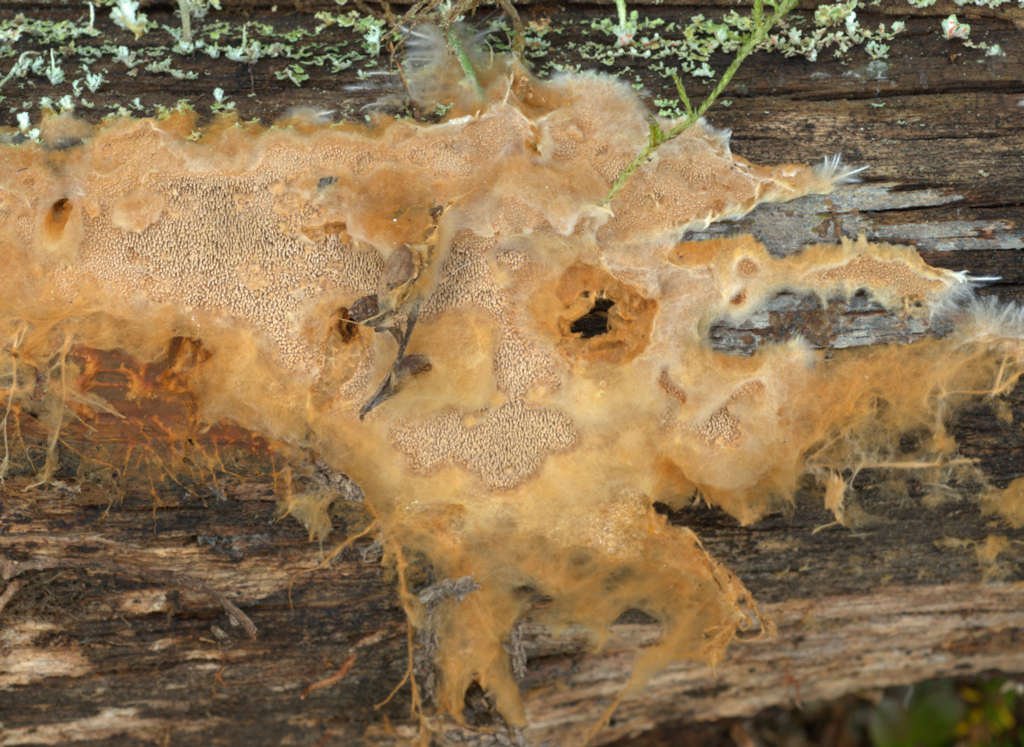
Asterodon ferruginosus, a hydnoid old spruce forest indicator

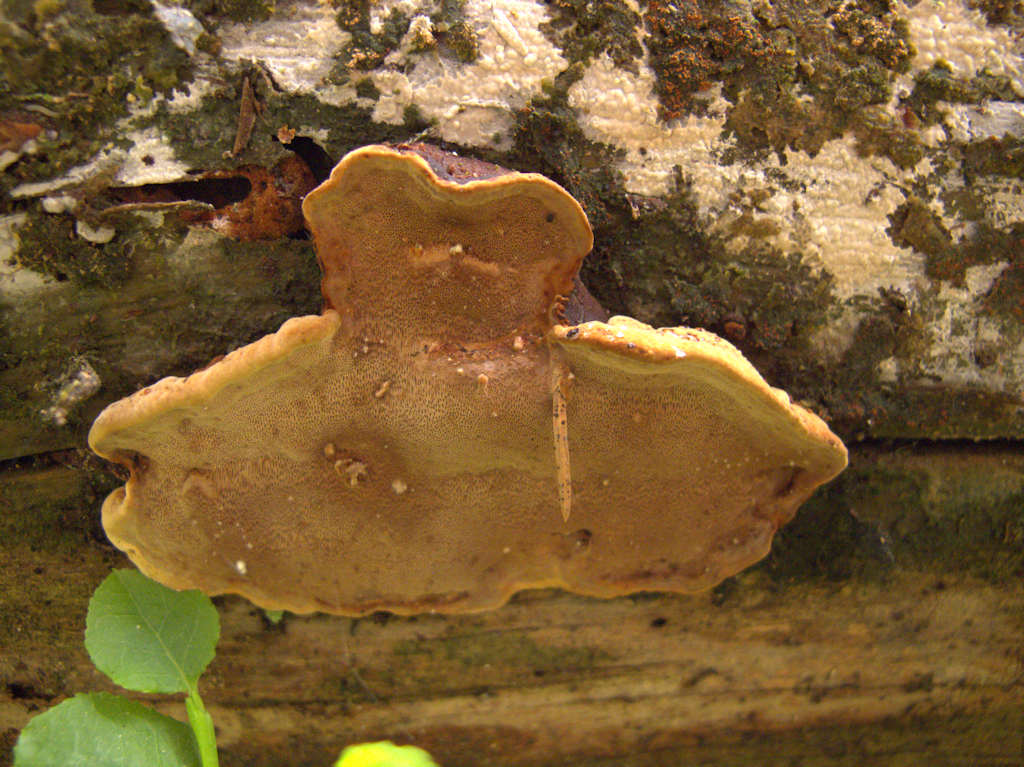
Phellinus nigrolimitatus, an old spruce and pine forest indicator

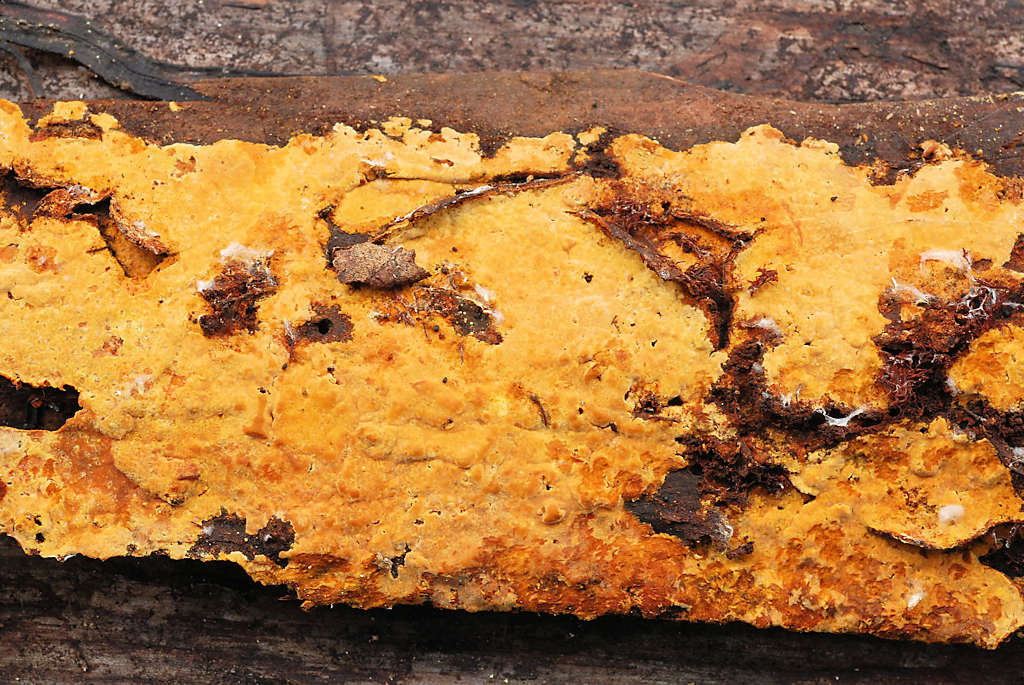
Crustoderma dryinum, an old spruce and pine forest indicator

- Anomoporia bombycina
- Antrodia pulvinascens
- Asterodon ferruginosus
- Crustoderma dryinum
- Fomitopsis rosea
- Gloiodon strigosus
- Leptoporus mollis
- Pelloporus leporinus (Onnia l.)
- Perenniporia subacida
- Phaeolus schweinitzii
- Phellinus abietis
- Phellinus ferrugineofuscus
- Phellinus lundellii
- Phellinus nigrolimitatus
- Phellinus viticola
- Postia guttulata
- Postia lateritia
- Pycnoporellus fulgens
- Rhodonia placenta
- Skeletocutis odora

==== Virgin forest species ====
- Amylocystis lapponica
- Antrodia albobrunnea
- Antrodia crassa
- Antrodia infirma
- Antrodiella citrinella
- Cystostereum murrayi
- Diplomitoporus crustulinus
- Junghuhnia collabens (Steccherinum c.)
- Laurilia sulcata
- Lepiota lignicola (Leucopholiota decorosa)
- Phlebia centrifuga
- Sidera lenis (Skeletocutis l.)
- Skeletocutis stellae

=== Indicator species, pine dominated forests ===
==== Old forests ====
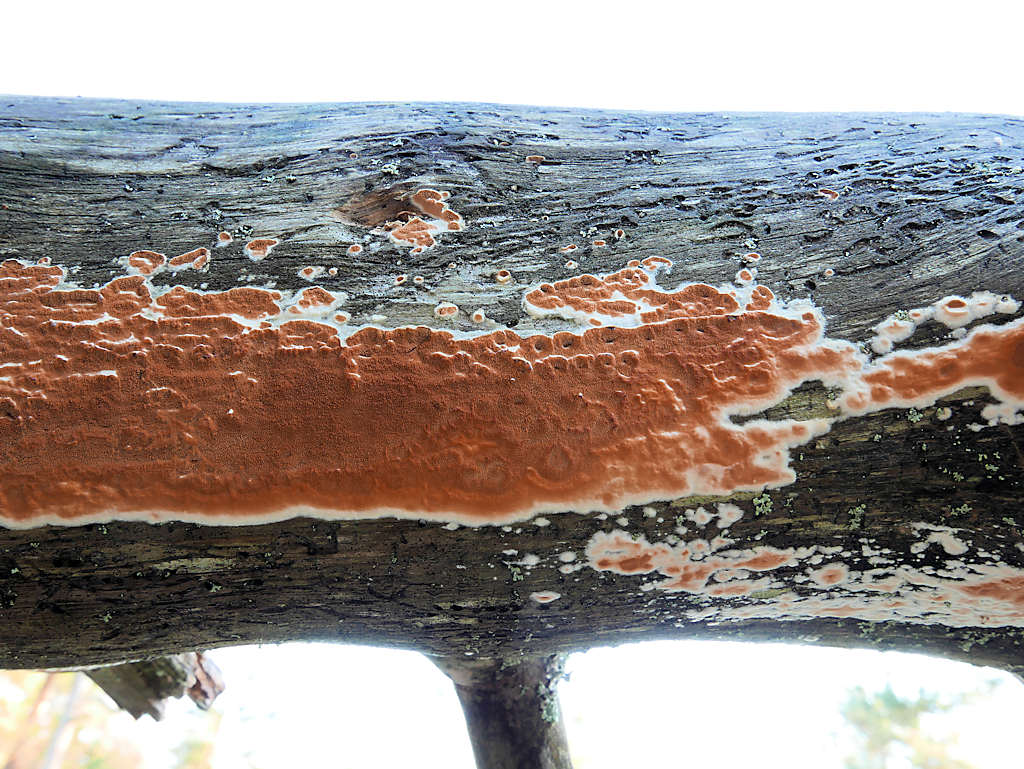
Meruliopsis taxicola, an old pine forest indicator polypore

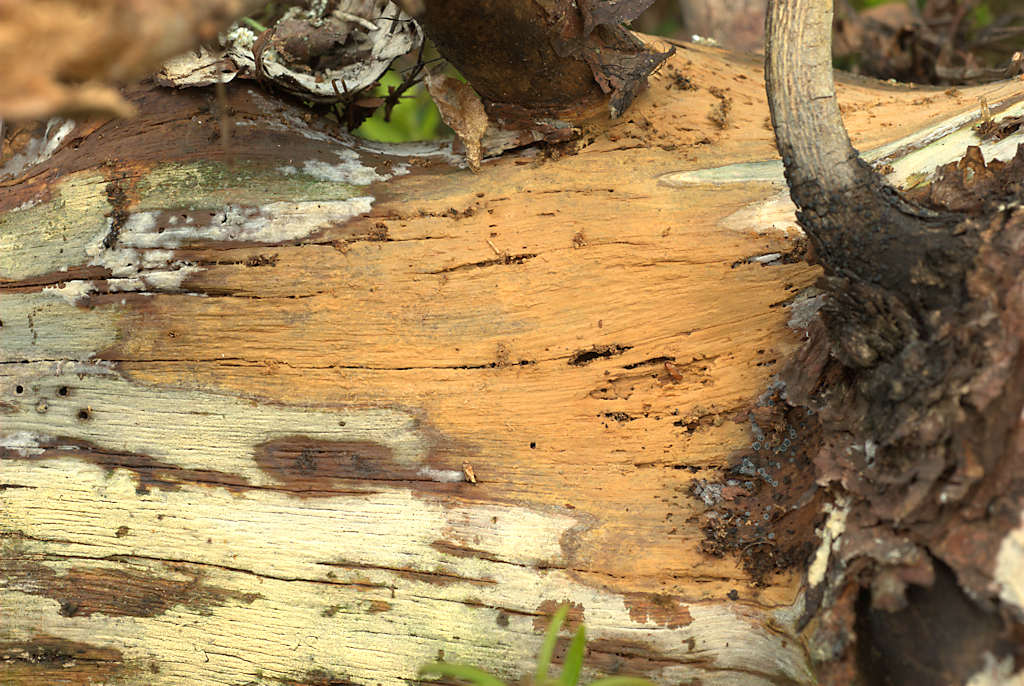
Phlebia serialis, an old pine forest indicator and a crust fungus

- Anomoporia kamtschatica
- Chaetodermella luna
- Crustoderma dryinum
- Irpicodon pendulus
- Junghuhnia luteoalba (Steccherinum l.)
- Leptoporus mollis
- Meruliopsis taxicola
- Odonticium romellii
- Oligoporus sericeomollis
- Phaeolus schweinitzii
- Phellinus nigrolimitatus
- Phellinus pini
- Phellinus viticola
- Phlebia cretacea
- Phlebia serialis
- Postia lateritia
- Postia leucomallella
- Pseudomerulius aureus
- Sistotremastrum suecicum
- Sparassis crispa

==== Virgin forests ====
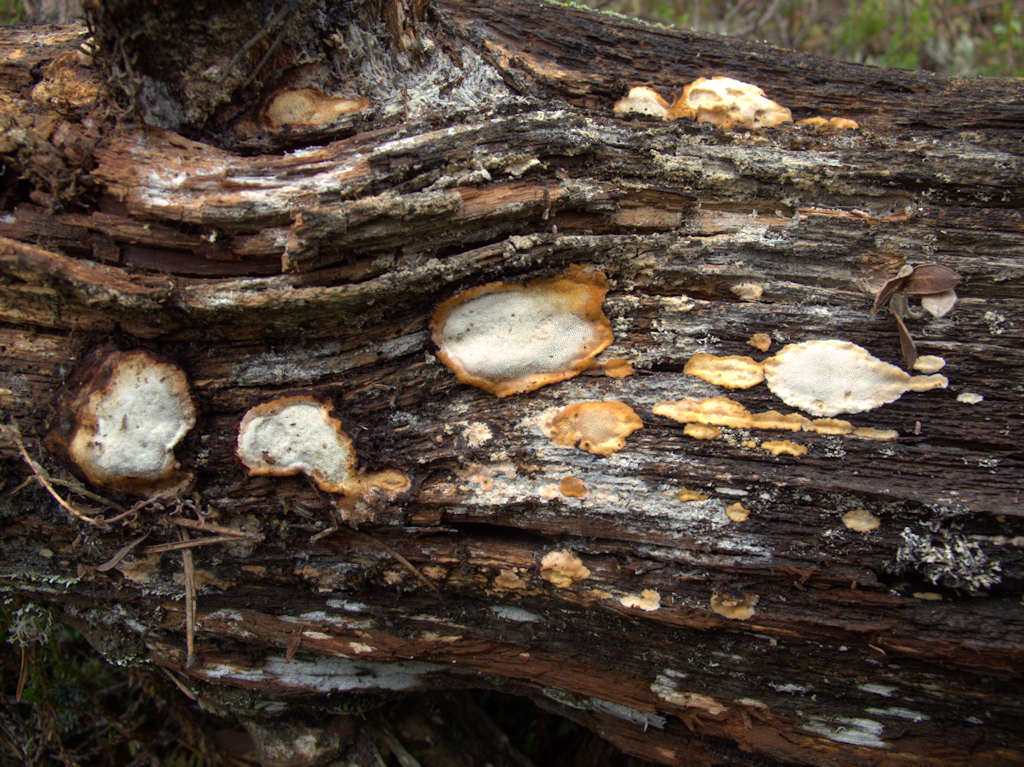
Antrodia albobrunnea), a virgin pine forest indicator

- Antrodia albobrunnea
- Antrodia crassa
- Antrodia infirma
- Antrodia primaeva
- Crustoderma corneum (Phlebia c.)
- Dichomitus squalens
- Gloeophyllum protractum
- Hyphodontia curvispora
- Postia parva
- Sidera lenis (Skeletocutis l.)
- Skeletocutis jelicii
- Skeletocutis stellae
- Tyromyces canadensis

== Other indicator fungi schemes ==
Also Bonsdorff et al. (2014) have published lists of mushrooms and other terrestrial macrofungi that indicate the biodiversity of various forest types in Finland.
