= Amyloporia =

Scientific classification
- Kingdom: Fungi
- Division: Basidiomycota
- Class: Agaricomycetes
- Order: Polyporales
- Family: Polyporaceae
- Genus: Amyloporia; Singer (1944)

Type species
- Amyloporia calcea (Fr.) Bondartsev & Singer (1944)

Species
- A. nothofaginea A. sinuosa A. stratosa A. subxantha A. turkestanica

Synonyms
- Amyloporia Bondartsev & Singer (1941)

Genus of fungi

Amyloporia is a genus of five species of crust fungi in the family Polyporaceae. Its main distinguishing characteristic is the amyloid reaction of the skeletal hyphae, although some authors do not consider this to be sufficient to distinguish Amyloporia from the related genus Antrodia.

== Taxonomy ==
The genus was originally circumscribed by Apollinaris Semenovich Bondartsev and Rolf Singer in 1941 as part of the subfamily Poroideae of the family Polyporaceae. Four species were included: the type Antrodia calcea, A. crassa, A. xantha, and A. lenis. These mycologists later independently published the genus with a Latin description (establishing the validity of the publication in accordance with rules of nomenclature): Singer in 1944, and Bondartsev in 1953. There has historically been much confusion about the true identity of A. calcea. It is now classified in the genus Antrodia (family Fomitopsidaceae) as Antrodia calceus. Some authors have preferred to treat Amyloporia as synonymous with Antrodia. A molecular study published in 2010 determined that the five species then considered part of Amyloporia did not group together phylogenetically, and that Amyloporia was not worthy of generic status.

The generic name Amyloporia combines the Ancient Greek word άμυλον ("starch") and the name Poria.

== Description ==
Bondartsev and Singer, in their description of Amyloporia, emphasized the pore colour–initially white or colored, eventually becoming whiteish or often yellowish to slightly brownish; and amyloid trama in the adult fruit body. These features helped distinguish Amyloporia from the morphologically similar Ceraporus and Aporpium.

== Species ==
As of June 2017, Index Fungorum accepts five species in Amyloporia:

- A. nothofaginea Rajchenb. & Gorjón (2011) – southern Andes
- A. sinuosa (Fr.) Rajchenb., Gorjón & Pildain (2011)
- A. stratosa (J.E.Wright & J.R.Deschamps) Rajchenb., Gorjón & Pildain (2011) – South America, Tasmania
- A. subxantha (Y.C.Dai & X.S.He) B.K.Cui & Y.C.Dai (2013) – China
- A. turkestanica (Pilát) Bondartsev (1953) – central Asia

Index Fungorum shows 30 taxa associated with the generic name Amyloporia. Several species once placed in this genus have since been transferred to other genera:

- Amyloporia alpina (Litsch.) Domański (1974) = Antrodia alpina (Litsch.) Gilb. & Ryvarden (1985)
- Amyloporia calcea (Fr.) Bondartsev & Singer (1944) = Antrodia calceus (Fr.) Teixeira (1992)
- Amyloporia carbonica (Overh.) Vampola & Pouzar (1993) = Antrodia carbonica (Overh.) Ryvarden & Gilb. 1984)
- Amyloporia crassa (P.Karst.) Bondartsev & Singer (1941) = Antrodia crassa (P.Karst.) Ryvarden (1973)
- Amyloporia lenis (P.Karst.) Bondartsev & Singer (1941) = Sidera lenis (P.Karst.) Miettinen (2011)
- Amyloporia pinea B.K.Cui & Y.C.Dai (2013) = Antrodia pinea (B.K.Cui & Y.C.Dai) V.Spirin (2015)
- Amyloporia sitchensis (D.V.Baxter) Vampola & Pouzar (1993) = Antrodia sitchensis (D.V.Baxter) Gilb. & Ryvarden (1985)
- Amyloporia sordida (Ryvarden & Gilb.) Vampola & Pouzar (1993) = Antrodia sordida Ryvarden & Gilb. (1984)
- Amyloporia xantha (Fr.) Bondartsev & Singer (1941) = Antrodia xantha (Fr.) Ryvarden (1973)
