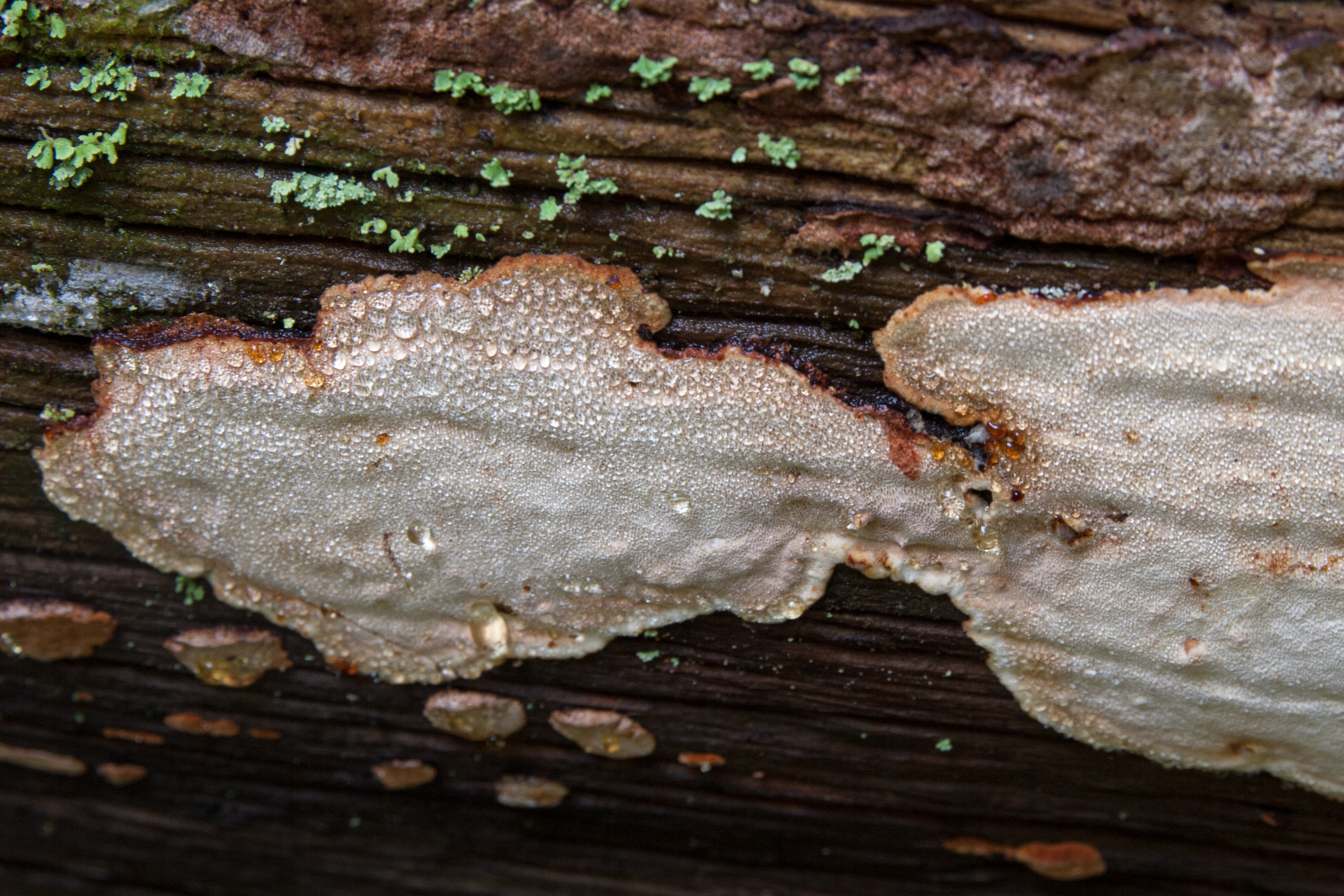
- Anthoporia albobrunnea

Scientific classification
- Kingdom: Fungi
- Division: Basidiomycota
- Class: Agaricomycetes
- Order: Polyporales
- Family: Meripilaceae
- Genus: Anthoporia; Karasiński & Niemelä (2016)

Type species
- Anthoporia albobrunnea (Romell) Karasiński & Niemelä (2016)

Synonyms
- Polyporus albobrunneus Romell (1911); Leptoporus albobrunneus (Romell) Pilát (1938); Poria albobrunnea (Romell) D.V.Baxter (1939); Tyromyces albobrunneus (Romell) Bondartsev (1953); Antrodia albobrunnea (Romell) Ryvarden (1973); Coriolellus albobrunneus (Romell) Domański (1974); Piloporia albobrunnea (Romell) Ginns (1984)

= Anthoporia =

Genus of fungi

Anthoporia is a fungal genus in the family Meripilaceae. It is a monotypic genus, circumscribed in 2016 to contain the single species Anthoporia albobrunnea.

== Taxonomy ==
The fungus was first described scientifically by Swedish mycologist Lars Romell in 1911, who called it Polyporus albobrunneus. Over the following several decades, it was shuffled to several general by different authors: Leptoporus (Pilát, 1938), Poria (D.V.Baxter), Tyromyces (Bondartsev, 1953), Antrodia (Ryvarden, 1973), Coriolellus (Domanski, 1974), and Piloporia (Ginns, 1984).

== Habitat and distribution ==
In 2004, Anthoporia albobrunnea was one of 33 species proposed for protection under the Bern Convention by the European Council for Conservation of Fungi.
