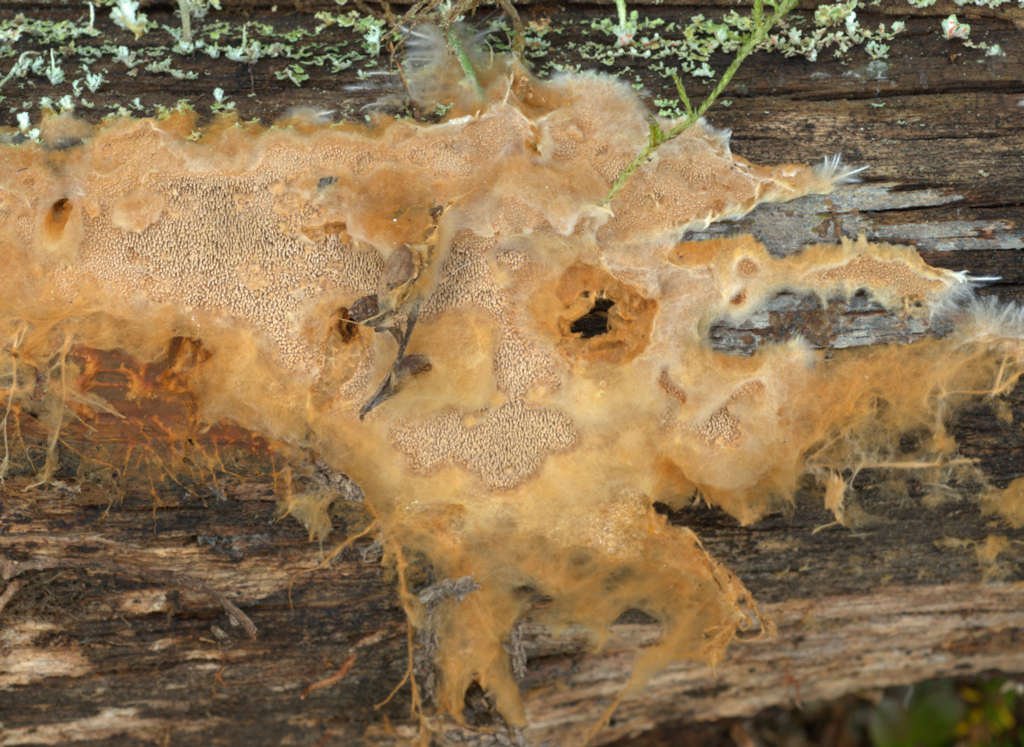
- Asterodon ferruginosus

Scientific classification
- Domain: Eukaryota
- Kingdom: Fungi
- Division: Basidiomycota
- Class: Agaricomycetes
- Order: Hymenochaetales
- Family: Hymenochaetaceae
- Genus: Asterodon; Pat. (1894)

Type species
- Asterodon ferruginosus Pat. (1894)

Species
- A. albus A. ferruginosus

Synonyms
- Acia subgen. Aciella P.Karst. (1889); Hydnochaete Peck (1898); Hydnochaetella Sacc. (1898); Aciella (P.Karst.) P.Karst. (1899)

= Asterodon =

Genus of fungi

Asterodon is a genus of two species of crust fungi in the family Hymenochaetaceae. Several species once placed in this genus were transferred to Pseudasterodon.

== Species list ==
- Asterodon albus Rick 1959
- Asterodon ferruginosus Pat. 189
