= Dow Baxter =

American mycologist

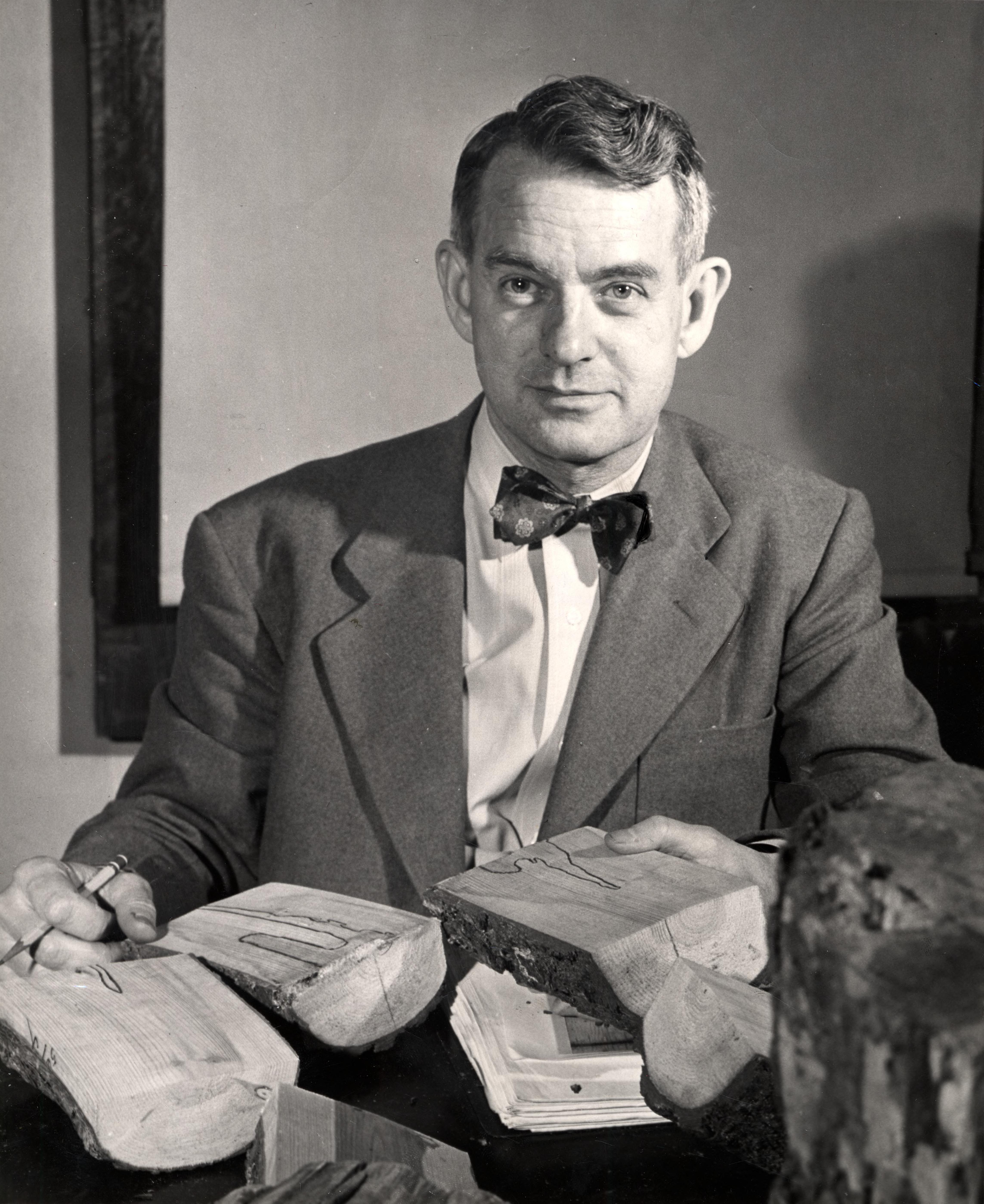
University of Michigan faculty portrait

Dow Vauter Baxter (January 16, 1895 – December 31, 1965) was an American mycologist. He was an authority on wood-decay fungi, especially the polypores. Baxter was a professor of forest pathology at the University of Michigan, where he started employment in 1926. The fungus Rhizopogon baxteri was named in Baxter's honor.

He also published an illustrated account of fieldwork with two colleagues to study Alaskan forests and forest diseases.

== See also ==
- List of mycologists
