= Oligoporin D =

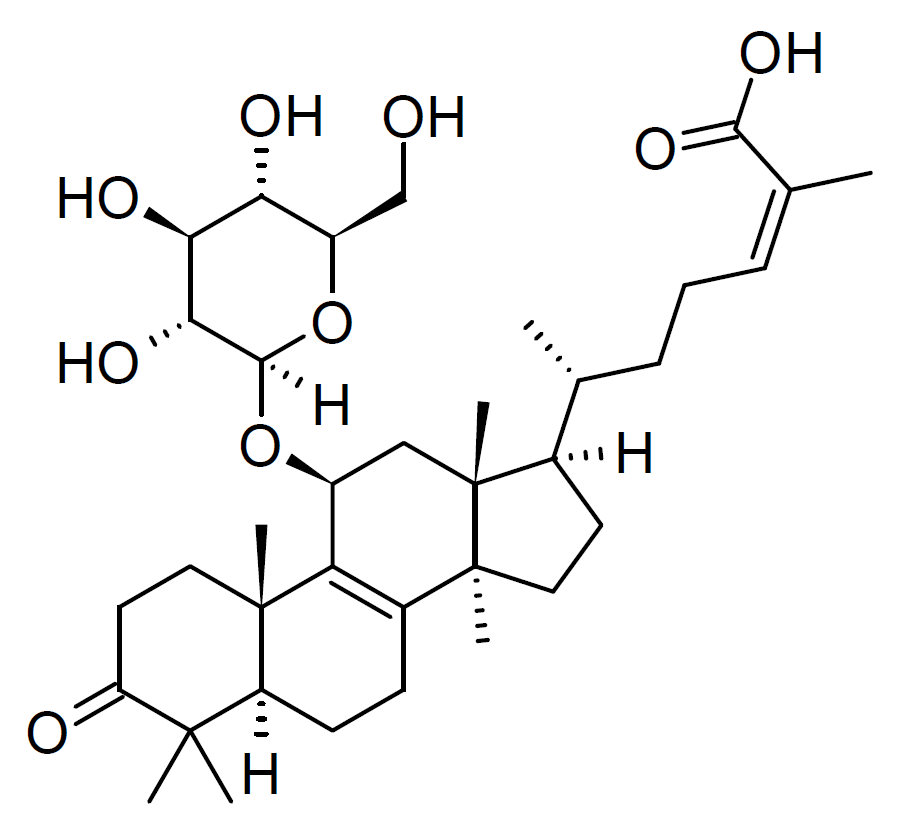

Identifiers
- IUPAC name: (Z,6R)-6-[(3R,5R,10S,12R,13R,14R,17R)-3-oxo-4,4,10,13,14-pentamethyl-12-[(2R,3R,4S,5S,6R)-3,4,5-trihydroxy-6-(hydroxymethyl)oxan-2-yl]oxy-1,2,3,5,6,11,12,15,16,17-decahydrocyclopenta[a]phenanthren-17-yl]-2-methylhept-2-enoic acid

Chemical and physical data
- Formula: C_{36}H_{56}O_{9}
- Molar mass: 632.835 g·mol^{−1}
- 3D model (JSmol): Interactive image
- SMILES: C[C@@]12C[C@H](O[C@@H]3O[C@H](CO)[C@@H](O)[C@H](O)[C@H]3O)C3=C(CC[C@@H]4[C@]3(C)CCC(=O)C4(C)C)[C@]2(C)CC[C@@H]1[C@H](C)CC\C=C(\C)C(=O)O

Oligoporin D is a steroid glycoside isolated from the "bitter bracket" mushroom Amaropostia stiptica. It was found to be one of the most potent agonists yet discovered for the bitter taste receptor TAS2R46, and consequently one of the most bitter substances known.
