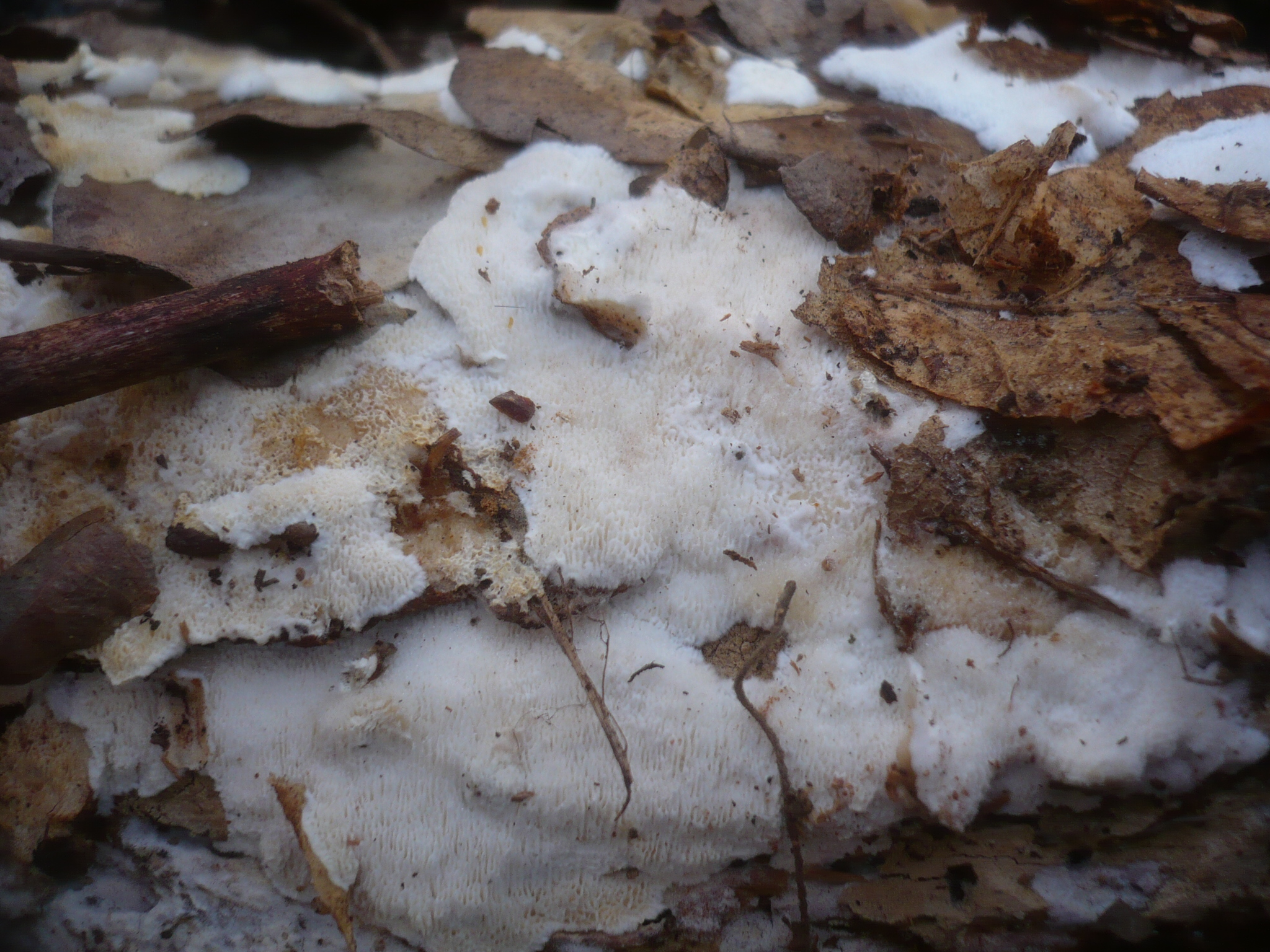
- Sidera lenis

Scientific classification
- Domain: Eukaryota
- Kingdom: Fungi
- Division: Basidiomycota
- Class: Agaricomycetes
- Order: Hymenochaetales
- Family: Rickenellaceae
- Genus: Sidera; Miettinen & K.H.Larss. (2011)

Type species
- Sidera lenis (P.Karst.) Miettinen (2011)

Species
- S. lenis S. lowei S. lunata S. vulgaris

= Sidera (fungus) =

Genus of fungi

Sidera is a genus of crust fungi in the order Hymenochaetales. Circumscribed in 2011, the genus is characterized by species that have whitish resupinate fruit bodies, crystal rosettes on specialized hyphae, and sausage-shaped (allantoid) spores.
