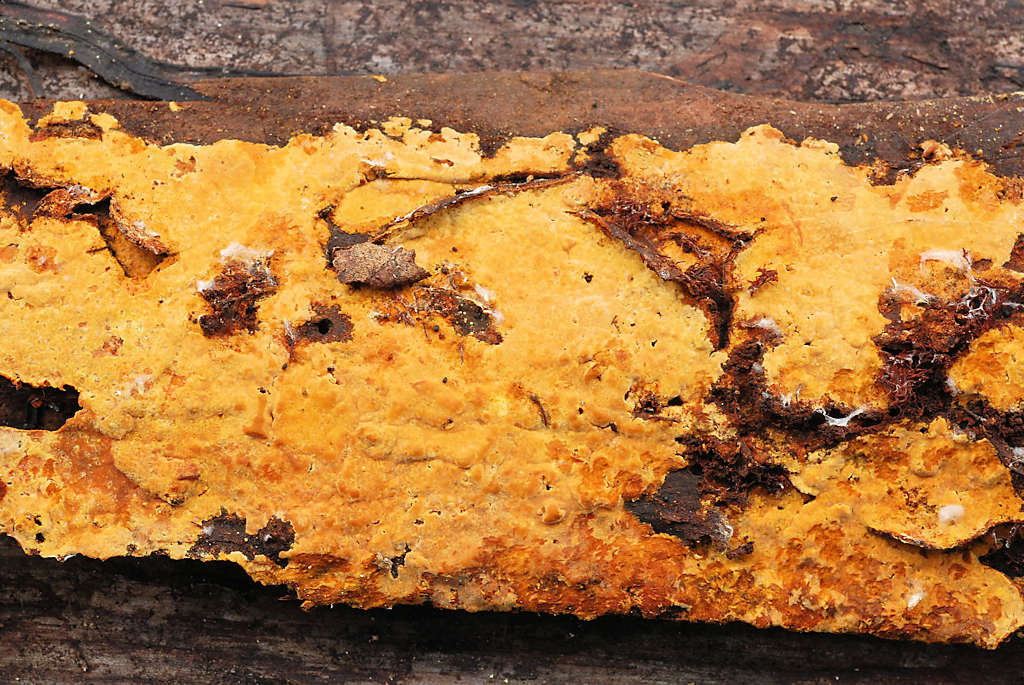
- Crustoderma dryinum

Scientific classification
- Kingdom: Fungi
- Division: Basidiomycota
- Class: Agaricomycetes
- Order: Polyporales
- Family: Meruliaceae
- Genus: Crustoderma; Parmasto (1968)

Type species
- Crustoderma dryinum (Berk. & M.A.Curtis) Parmasto (1968)

= Crustoderma =

Genus of fungi

Crustoderma is a genus of crust fungi in the family Meruliaceae.

== Species ==
- Crustoderma borbonicum Boidin & Gilles (1991)
- Crustoderma carolinense Nakasone (1984)
- Crustoderma corneum (Bourdot & Galzin) Nakasone (1984)
- Crustoderma dryinum (Berk. & M.A.Curtis) Parmasto (1968)
- Crustoderma efibulatum Kotir. & Saaren. (2006)
- Crustoderma fibuligerum (K.S.Thind & S.S.Rattan) Duhem (2010)
- Crustoderma flavescens Nakasone & Gilb. (1982)
- Crustoderma fuscatum Gilb. & Nakasone (2003)
- Crustoderma gigacystidium Gilb. & Hemmes (2001)
- Crustoderma longicystidiatum (Litsch.) Nakasone (1984)
- Crustoderma marianum Nakasone (1984)
- Crustoderma nakasoneae Gilb. & M.Blackw. (1988)
- Crustoderma opuntiae Nakasone & Gilb. (1982)
- Crustoderma patricium (G.Cunn.) Nakasone (1984)
- Crustoderma resinosum (H.S.Jacks. & Dearden) Gilb. (1981)
- Crustoderma testatum (H.S.Jacks. & Dearden) Nakasone (1985)
- Crustoderma triste (Litsch. & S.Lundell) Duhem (2010)
- Crustoderma vulcanense (Gilb. & Adask.) Gilb. & Nakasone (2003)
