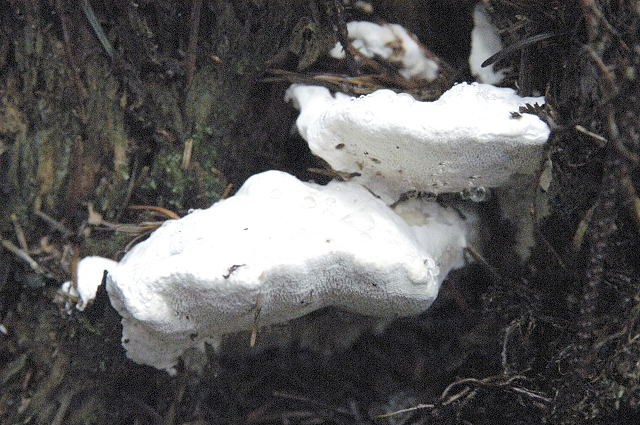
- Fruit body of Amaropostia stiptica

Scientific classification
- Kingdom: Fungi
- Division: Basidiomycota
- Class: Agaricomycetes
- Order: Polyporales
- Family: Fomitopsidaceae
- Genus: Amaropostia
- Species: A. stiptica

Binomial name
- Amaropostia stiptica (Berk. & M.A.Curtis) Rajchenb. (1995)

Synonyms
- Polyporus stipticus Berk. & M.A.Curtis (1853)

= Amaropostia stiptica =

Species of bitter-tasting polypore fungus

Amaropostia stiptica is a rare, bitter-tasting species of polypore fungus in the family Fomitopsidaceae. It is known for being one of the most bitter-tasting substances ever tested, surpassing denatonium benzoate in sensory assays. This fungus forms woody, shelf-like fruiting bodies and typically grows on dead or decaying hardwood in tropical and subtropical forests.

== Description ==
Amaropostia stiptica produces perennial, sessile, bracket-like fruiting bodies that are hard and woody. The upper surface is typically greyish to brownish and concentrically zoned, while the underside features fine pores. The taste is extraordinarily bitter, reportedly unbearable in sensory evaluations.

== Chemistry and bitterness ==
According to a 2025 study, A. stiptica contains multiple secondary metabolites such as Oligoporin D that activate human bitter taste receptors TAS2R14 and TAS2R46 with remarkable potency. Oligoporin D elicits responses up to 10 times greater than denatonium benzoate, previously considered the most bitter known substance. Researchers suggest that the extreme bitterness is likely a chemical defense mechanism.

== See also ==
- Fomitopsis
- Mycology
