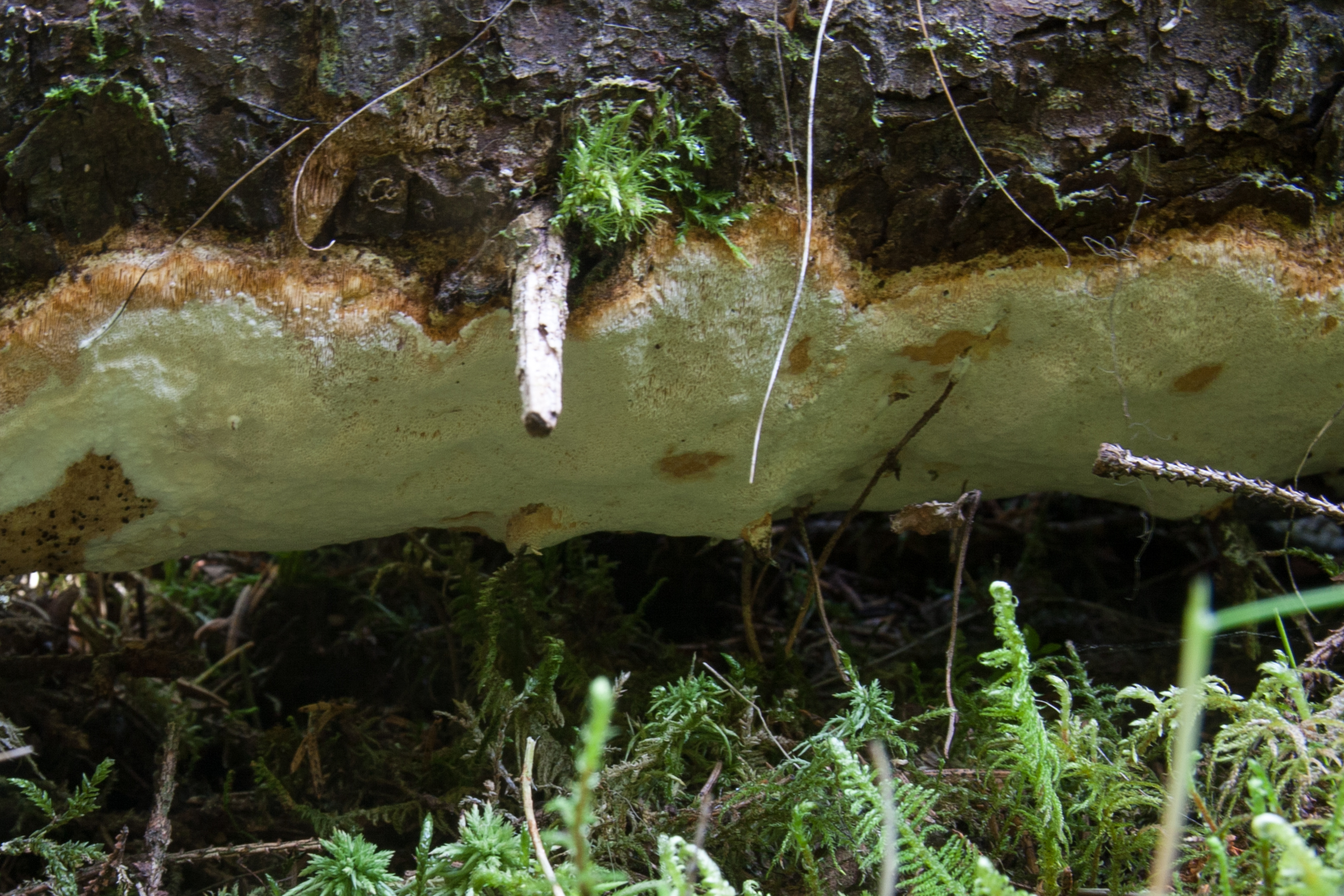

Scientific classification
- Domain: Eukaryota
- Kingdom: Fungi
- Division: Basidiomycota
- Class: Agaricomycetes
- Order: Polyporales
- Family: Polyporaceae
- Genus: Poriella
- Species: P. subacida

Binomial name
- Poriella subacida (Peck) C.L. Zhao (2021)

Synonyms
- List: Chaetoporus subacidus (Peck) Bondartsev & Singer (1941); Oxyporus subacidus (Peck) Komarova (1961); Perenniporia subacida (Peck) Donk (1967); Polyporus subacidus Peck (1885); Poria colorea Overh. & Englerth (1942); Poria fuscomarginata Berk. ex Cooke (1886); Poria subacida (Peck) Sacc. (1888); Poria subaurantia Berk. ex Cooke (1886)

= Poriella subacida =

Species of fungus

Poriella subacida is a species of poroid fungus in the family Polyporaceae. It is a plant pathogen that infects Douglas firs. The fungus was originally described in 1885 by American mycologist Charles Horton Peck.
