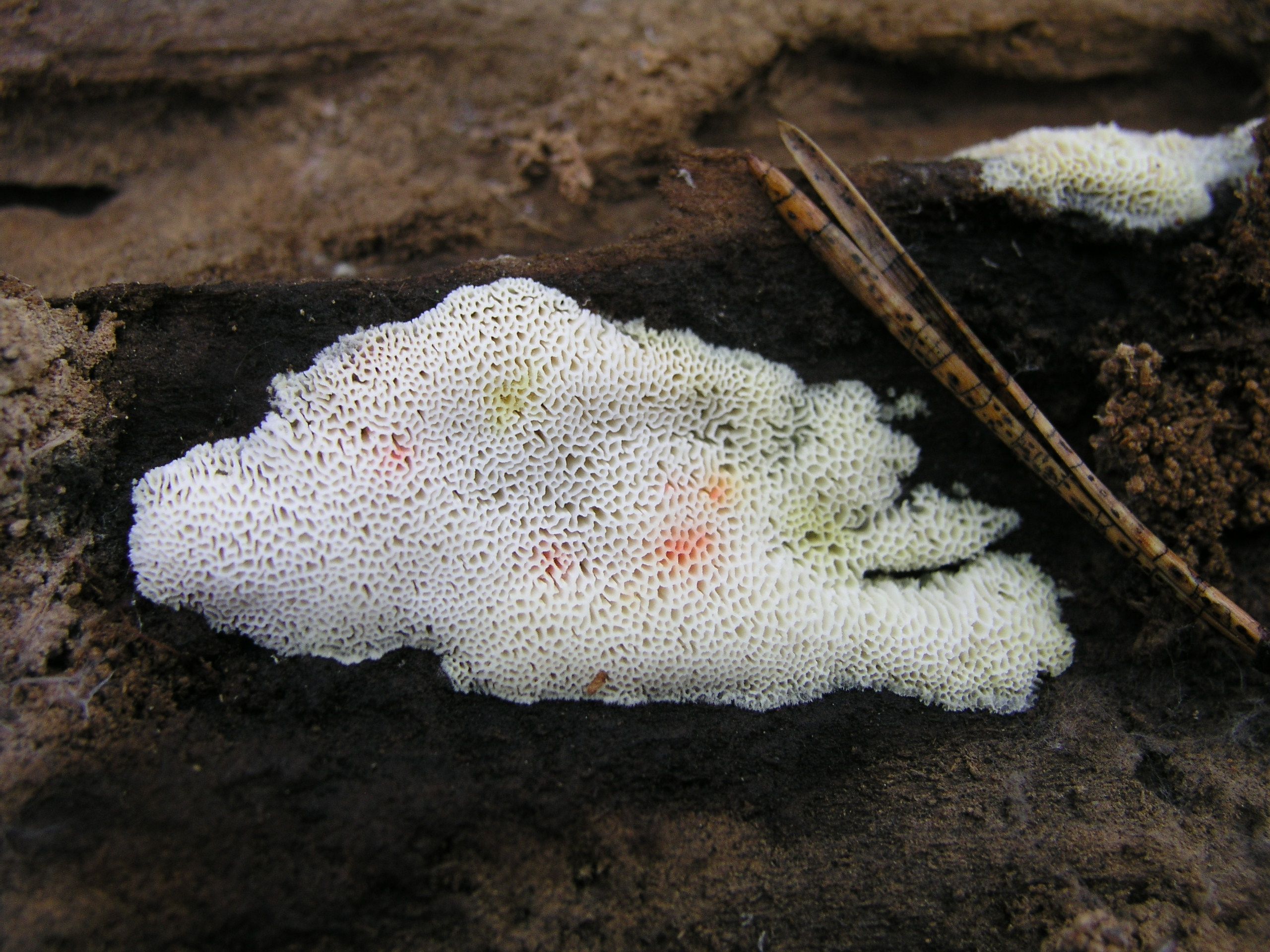

Scientific classification
- Domain: Eukaryota
- Kingdom: Fungi
- Division: Basidiomycota
- Class: Agaricomycetes
- Order: Polyporales
- Family: Fomitopsidaceae
- Genus: Neoantrodia
- Species: N. infirma

Binomial name
- Neoantrodia infirma (Renvall & Niemelä) Audet (2017)

Synonyms
- Antrodia infirma Renvall & Niemelä (1992)

= Neoantrodia infirma =

Species of fungus

Neoantrodia infirma is a species of fungus belonging to the family Fomitopsidaceae.
