= Oligoporus parvus =

Scientific classification
- Kingdom: Fungi
- Division: Basidiomycota
- Class: Agaricomycetes
- Order: Polyporales
- Family: Dacryobolaceae
- Genus: Oligoporus
- Species: O. parvus

Binomial name
- Oligoporus parvus Renvall, 2005

Species of fungus

Oligoporus parvus is a species of fungus belonging to the family Dacryobolaceae.

Synonym:

- Oligoporus parvus Renvall, 2005 (= basionym)
