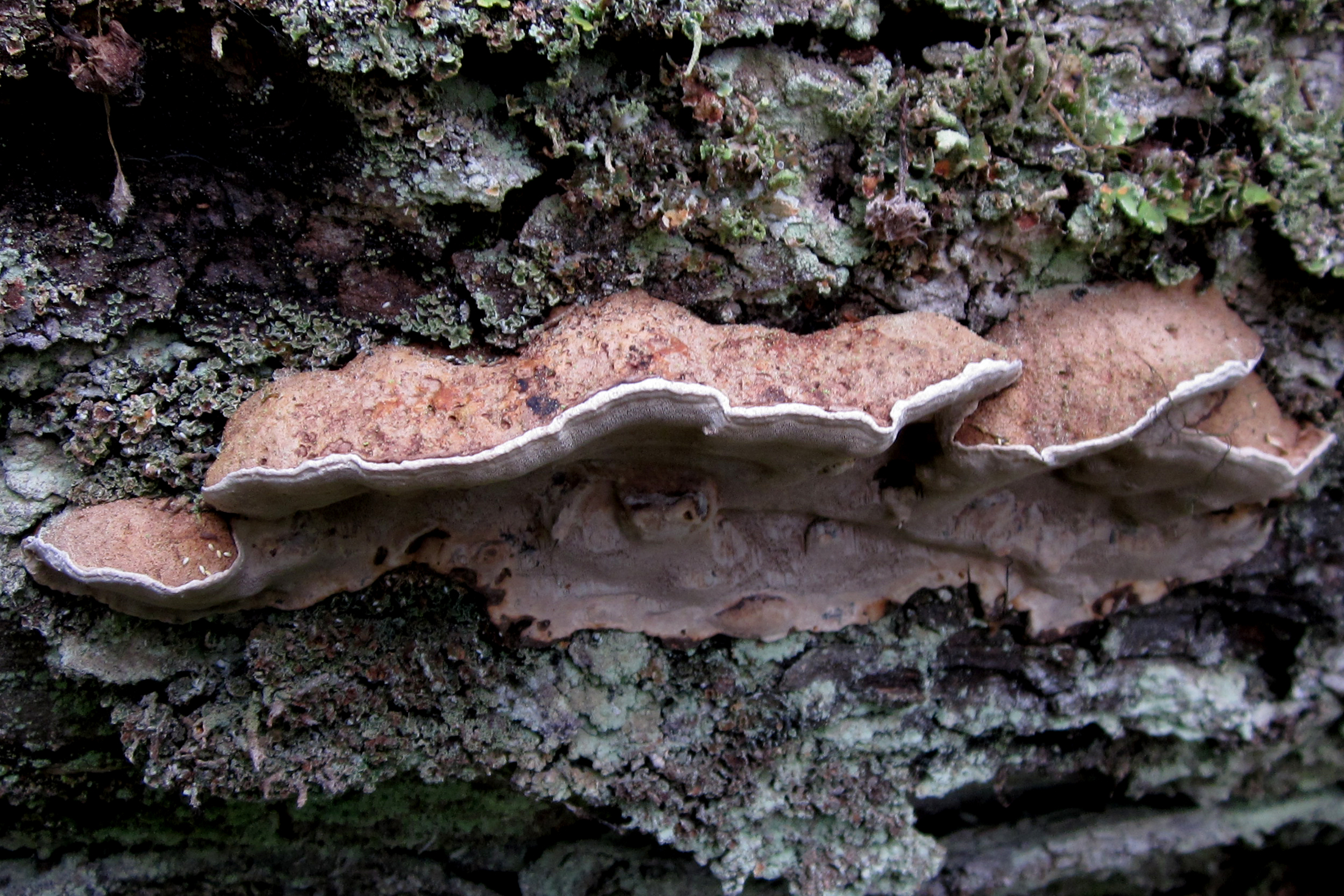

Scientific classification
- Domain: Eukaryota
- Kingdom: Fungi
- Division: Basidiomycota
- Class: Agaricomycetes
- Order: Hymenochaetales
- Family: Hymenochaetaceae
- Genus: Phellinus
- Species: P. nigrolimitatus

Binomial name
- Phellinus nigrolimitatus (Romell) Bourdot & Galzin

= Phellinus nigrolimitatus =

Species of fungus

Phellinus nigrolimitatus is a species of fungus belonging to the family Hymenochaetaceae.

It is native to Eurasia and Northern America.
