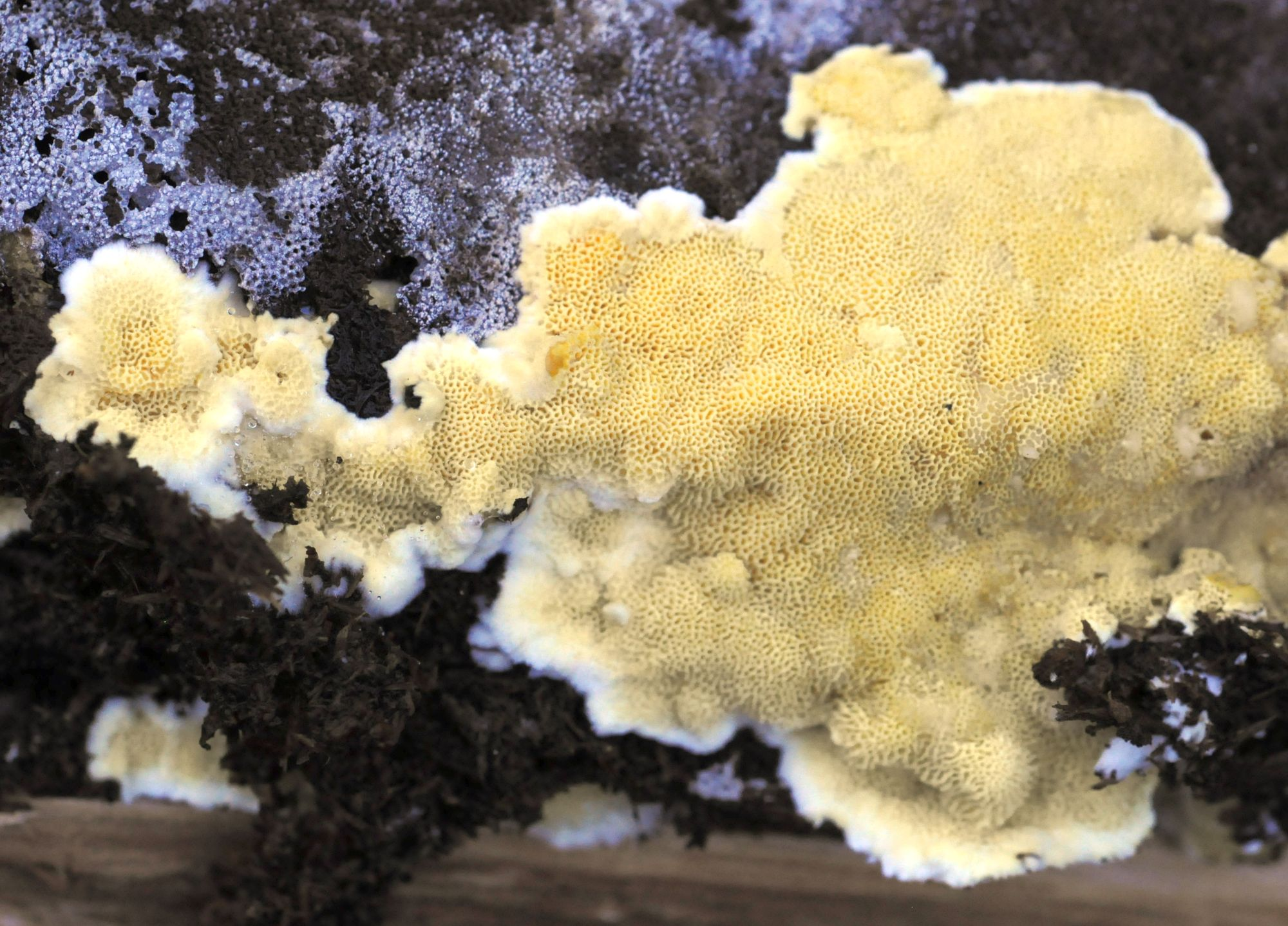

Scientific classification
- Kingdom: Fungi
- Division: Basidiomycota
- Class: Agaricomycetes
- Order: Polyporales
- Family: Steccherinaceae
- Genus: Antrodiella
- Species: A. citrinella

Binomial name
- Antrodiella citrinella Niemelä & Ryvarden, 1983

= Antrodiella citrinella =

Species of fungus

Antrodiella citrinella is a species of fungus belonging to the family Phanerochaetaceae.

It is native to Europe. The fungi has been discovered in 1983.
