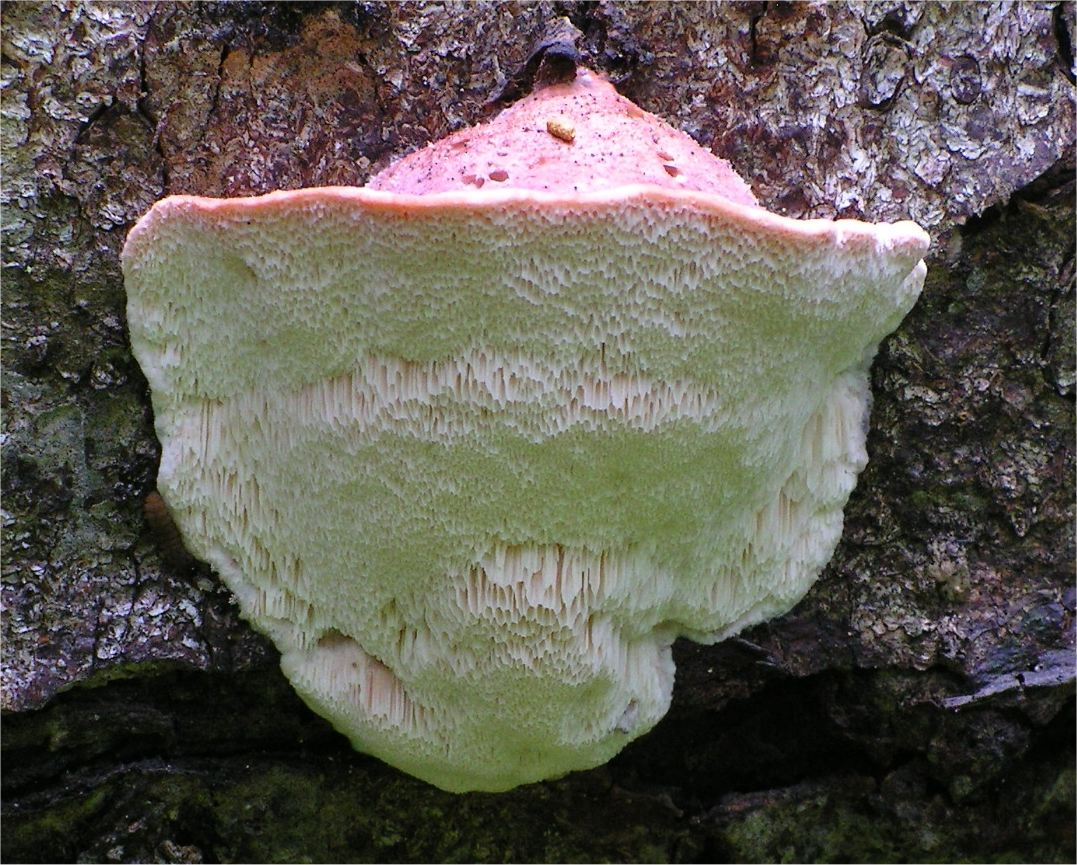
- Leptoporus mollis

Scientific classification
- Domain: Eukaryota
- Kingdom: Fungi
- Division: Basidiomycota
- Class: Agaricomycetes
- Order: Polyporales
- Family: Irpicaceae
- Genus: Leptoporus; Quél. (1886)

Type species
- Leptoporus mollis (Pers.) Quél. (1886)

= Leptoporus =

Genus of fungi

Leptoporus is a genus of polypore fungi. The type species, Leptoporus mollis (or the soft bracket), is widespread throughout north temperate areas. The generic name is derived from the Ancient Greek words λεπτός ("thin") and πόρος ("pore").

Although traditionally classified in the family Polyporaceae, recent molecular phylogenetic analysis supports the placement of Leptoporus in the Irpicaceae.

== Species ==
- Leptoporus alutaeformis Pat. (1920)
- Leptoporus apalus (Cooke) Pat. (1900)
- Leptoporus bulgaricus Pilát (1937)
- Leptoporus canaliculatus (Pat.) Pat. (1900)
- Leptoporus coriolus D.A.Reid (1963)
- Leptoporus dalmaticus Pilát (1953)
- Leptoporus lindtneri Pilát (1938)
- Leptoporus micantiformis Pilát (1936)
- Leptoporus mollis (Pers.) Quél. (1886)
- Leptoporus pallidocervinus (Schwein.) Pat. (1903)
- Leptoporus schulzeri (Bourdot & Galzin) Pilát (1938)
- Leptoporus werneri Pilát (1939)
