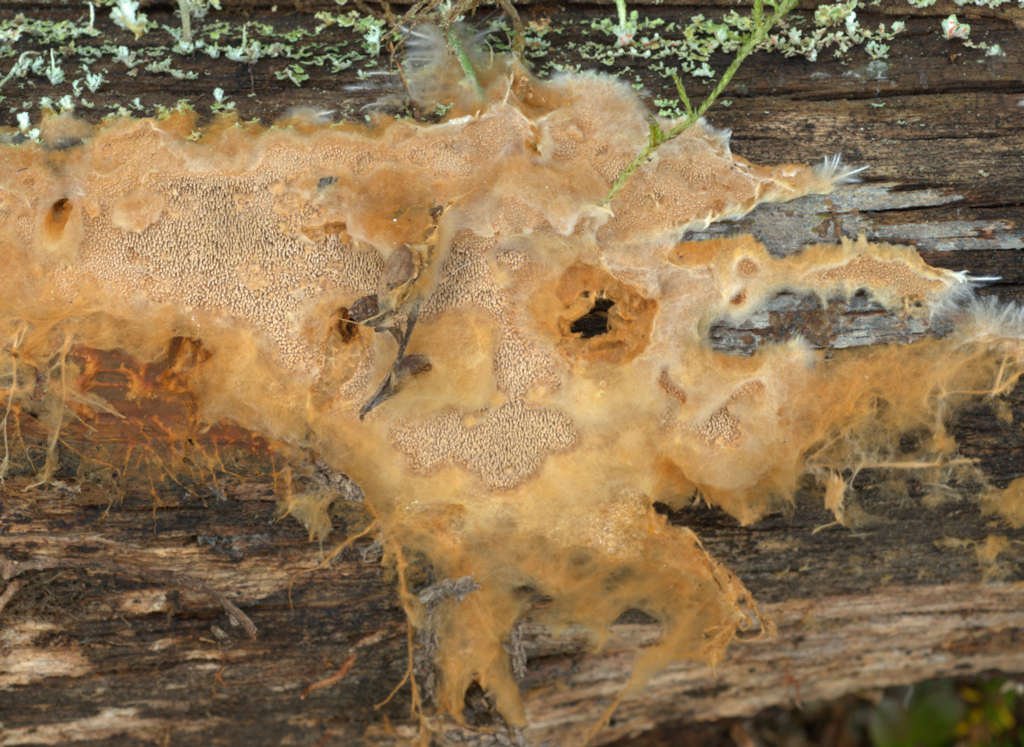

Scientific classification
- Domain: Eukaryota
- Kingdom: Fungi
- Division: Basidiomycota
- Class: Agaricomycetes
- Order: Hymenochaetales
- Family: Hymenochaetaceae
- Genus: Asterodon
- Species: A. ferruginosus

Binomial name
- Asterodon ferruginosus Pat. (1894)

= Asterodon ferruginosus =

Species of fungus

Asterodon ferruginosus is a species of fungus belonging to the family Hymenochaetaceae.

It is native to Eurasia and Northern America.
