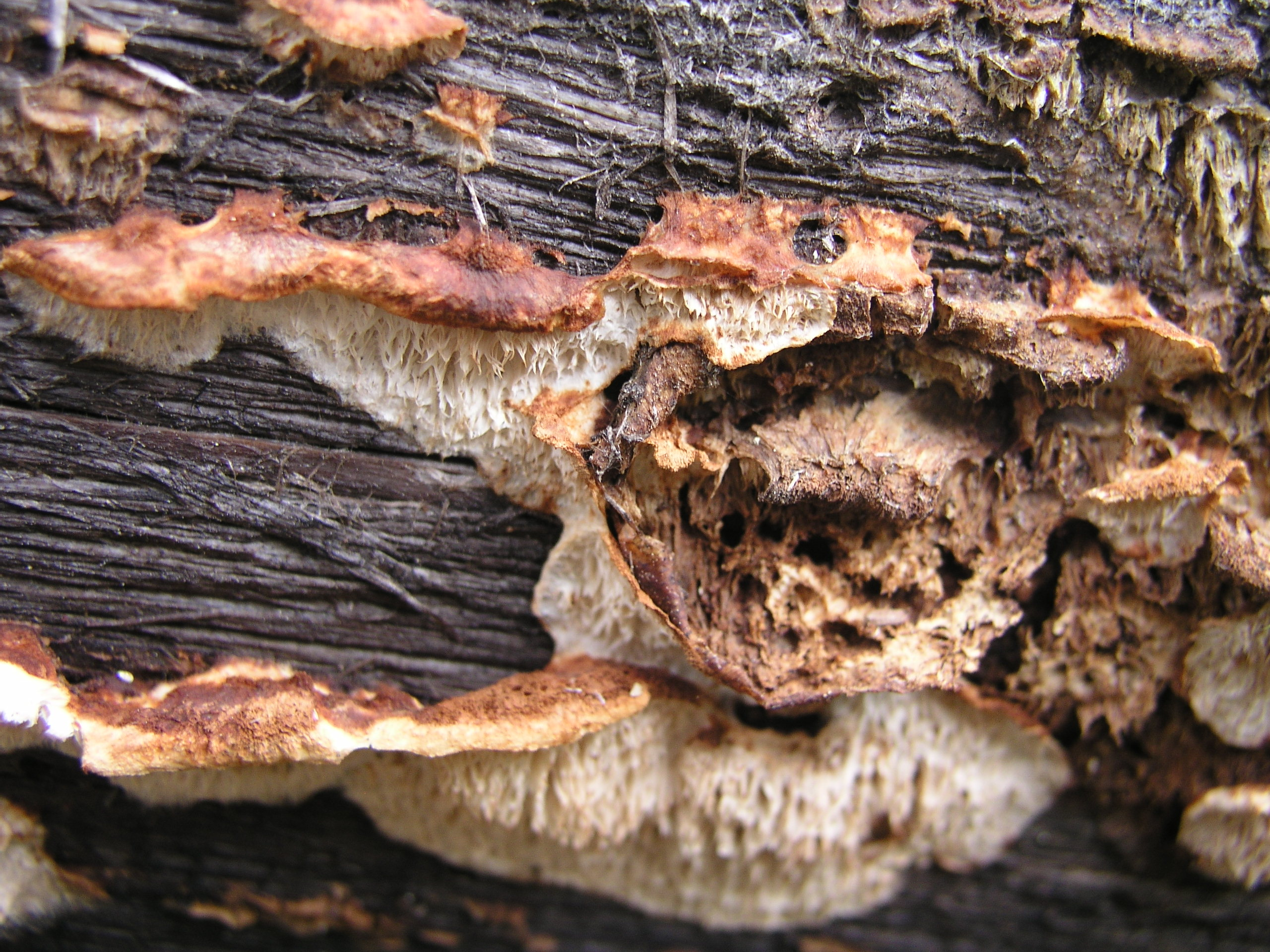

Scientific classification
- Domain: Eukaryota
- Kingdom: Fungi
- Division: Basidiomycota
- Class: Agaricomycetes
- Order: Polyporales
- Family: Fomitopsidaceae
- Genus: Postia
- Species: P. lateritia

Binomial name
- Postia lateritia Renvall

= Postia lateritia =

Species of fungus

Postia lateritia is a species of fungus belonging to the family Fomitopsidaceae.

It is native to Europe and Northern America.
