= Neoantrodia primaeva =

Scientific classification
- Domain: Eukaryota
- Kingdom: Fungi
- Division: Basidiomycota
- Class: Agaricomycetes
- Order: Polyporales
- Family: Fomitopsidaceae
- Genus: Neoantrodia
- Species: N. primaeva

Binomial name
- Neoantrodia primaeva (Renvall & Niemelä) Audet, 2017

Species of fungus

Neoantrodia primaeva is a species of fungus belonging to the family Fomitopsidaceae.

Synonym:

- Antrodia primaeva Renvall & Niemelä, 1992 (= basionym)
