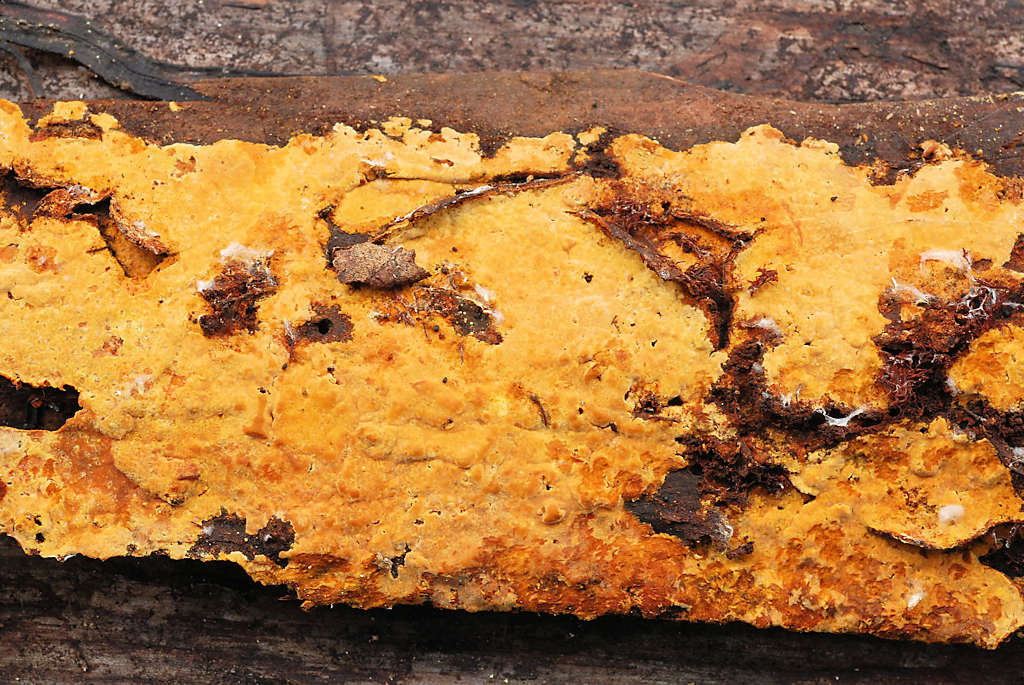

Scientific classification
- Domain: Eukaryota
- Kingdom: Fungi
- Division: Basidiomycota
- Class: Agaricomycetes
- Order: Polyporales
- Family: Meruliaceae
- Genus: Crustoderma
- Species: C. dryinum

Binomial name
- Crustoderma dryinum (Berk. & M.A.Curtis) Parmasto (1968)

Synonyms
- Corticium dryinum Berk. & M.A.Curtis (1873); Terana dryina (Berk. & M.A.Curtis) Kuntze (1891); Coniophora dryina (Berk. & M.A.Curtis) Burt (1917); Peniophora dryina (Berk. & M.A.Curtis) D.P.Rogers & H.S.Jacks. (1943); Xerocarpus laeticolor P.Karst. (1882); Corticium laeticolor (P.Karst.) Sacc. (1888); Coniophora laeticolor (P.Karst.) P.Karst. (1889); Terana laeticolor (P.Karst.) Kuntze (1891); Coniophorella laeticolor (P.Karst.) Pilát (1934); Coniophora crocea P.Karst. (1887); Peniophora crocea (P.Karst.) Höhn. & Litsch. (1906); Coniophorella crocea (P.Karst.) Rick (1959); Peniophora weirii Bres. (1925)

= Crustoderma dryinum =

Species of fungus

Crustoderma dryinum is a species of crust fungus in the family Meruliaceae, and the type species of the genus Crustoderma. It is found in Europe and Asia, where it causes a brown rot on conifer wood.
