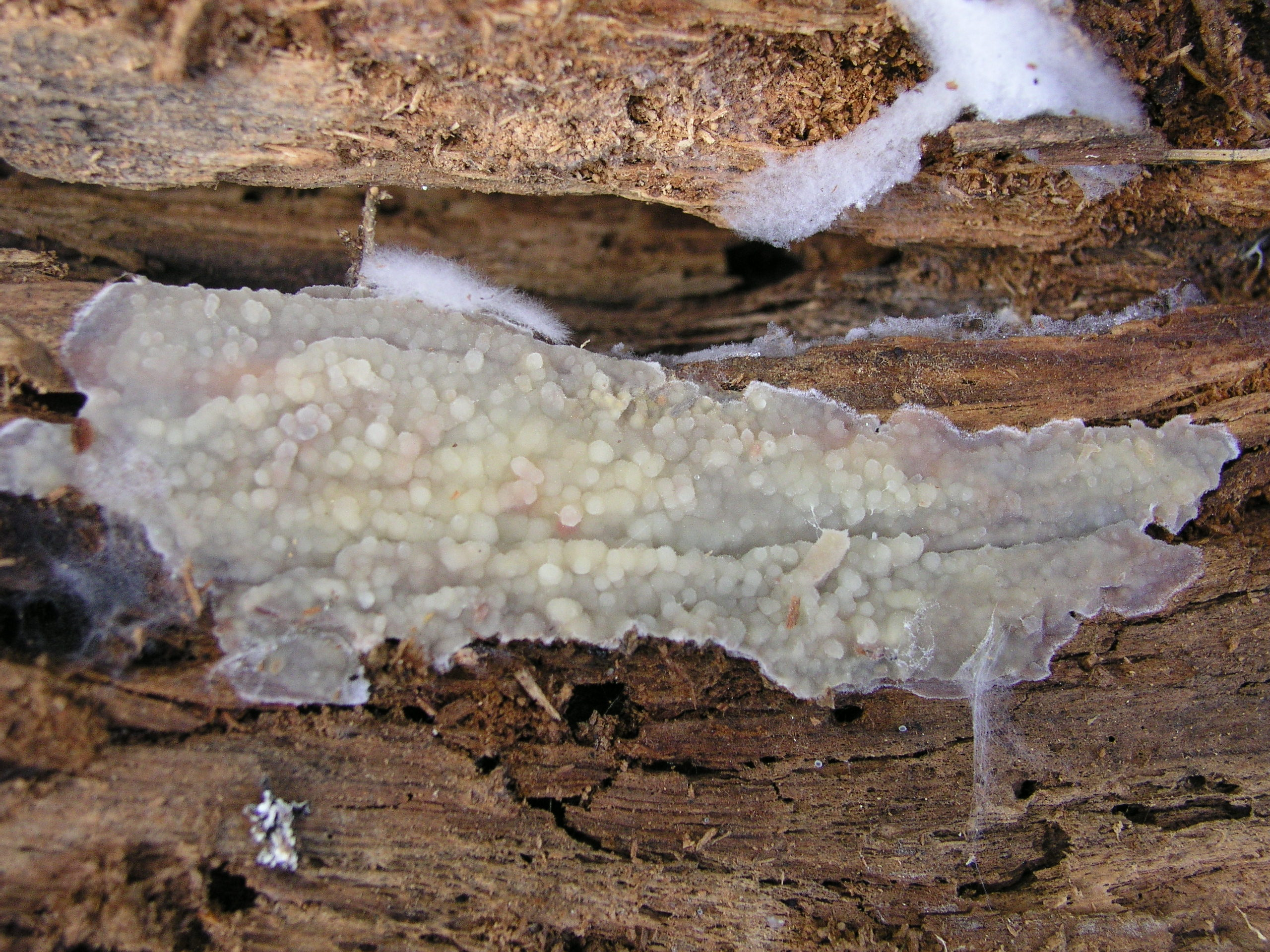

Scientific classification
- Domain: Eukaryota
- Kingdom: Fungi
- Division: Basidiomycota
- Class: Agaricomycetes
- Order: Polyporales
- Family: Meruliaceae
- Genus: Crustoderma
- Species: C. corneum

Binomial name
- Crustoderma corneum (Bourdot & Galzin) Nakasone

= Crustoderma corneum =

Species of fungus

Crustoderma corneum is a species of fungus belonging to the family Meruliaceae.

It is native to Europe, Russian Far East and Northern America.
