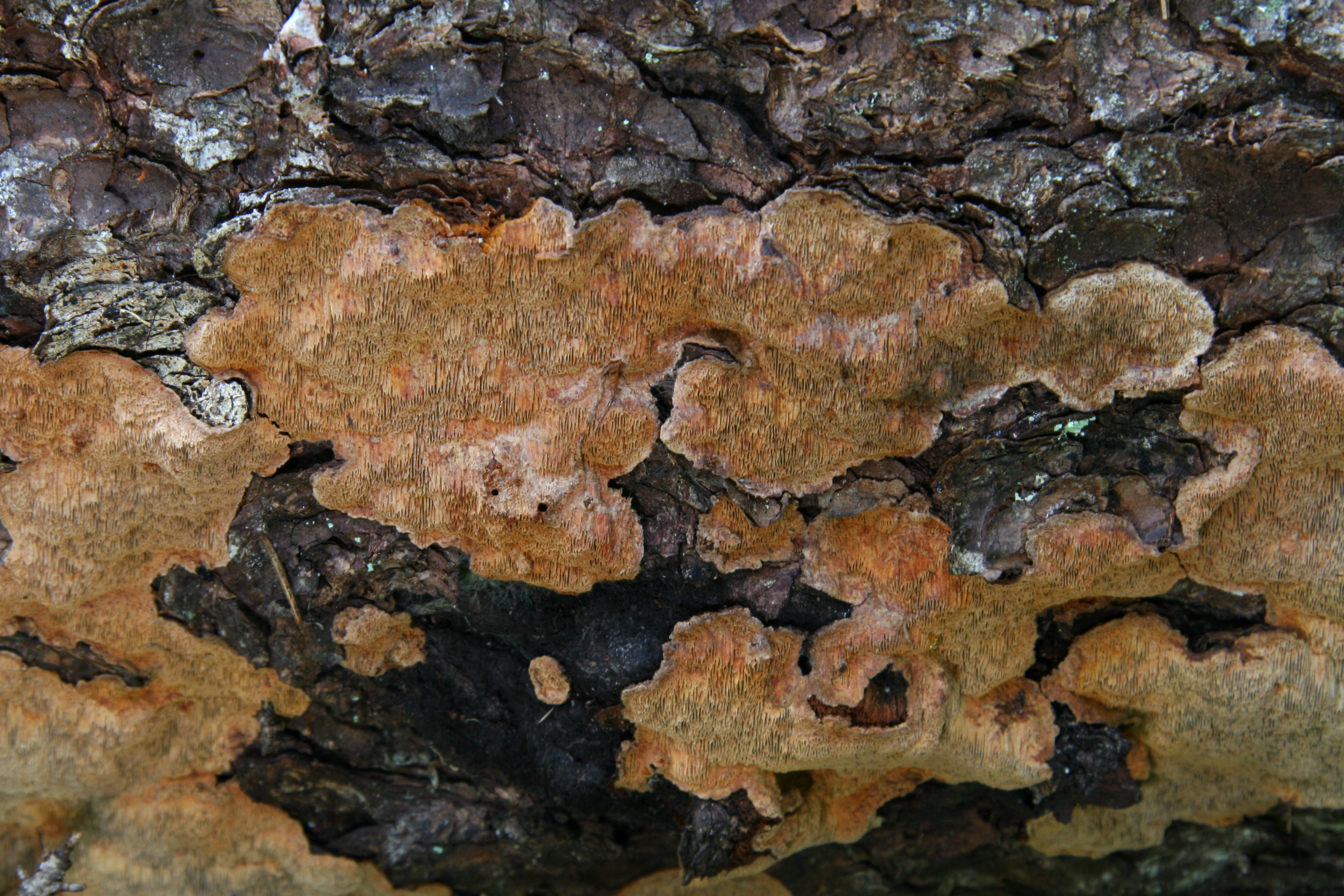

Scientific classification
- Kingdom: Fungi
- Division: Basidiomycota
- Class: Agaricomycetes
- Order: Hymenochaetales
- Family: Hymenochaetaceae
- Genus: Porodaedalea
- Species: P. chrysoloma

Binomial name
- Porodaedalea chrysoloma (Fr.) Fiasson & Niemelä, 1984

= Porodaedalea chrysoloma =

Species of fungus

Porodaedalea chrysoloma is a species of fungus belonging to the family Hymenochaetaceae. It is distributed across central Europe, also found in the south of Sweden, Norway and Finland.

P. chrysoloma can be found parasiting on Norway's Spruce, typically on the branches. It is considered a key species of the old growth boreal forests.

In Sweden, P. chrysoloma is classified as near threatened in the Swedish Red List due to the loss of its habitat.

Porodaedalea abietis, (also known as Porodaedalea laricis) is a sister species of Porodaedalea chryoloma. Their main morphological difference is in the hymenium pores. P. chrysoloma has elongated, daedaleois to laberyinthine irregular pores, while P. abietis has more regular, cylindrical and some elongated pores.
