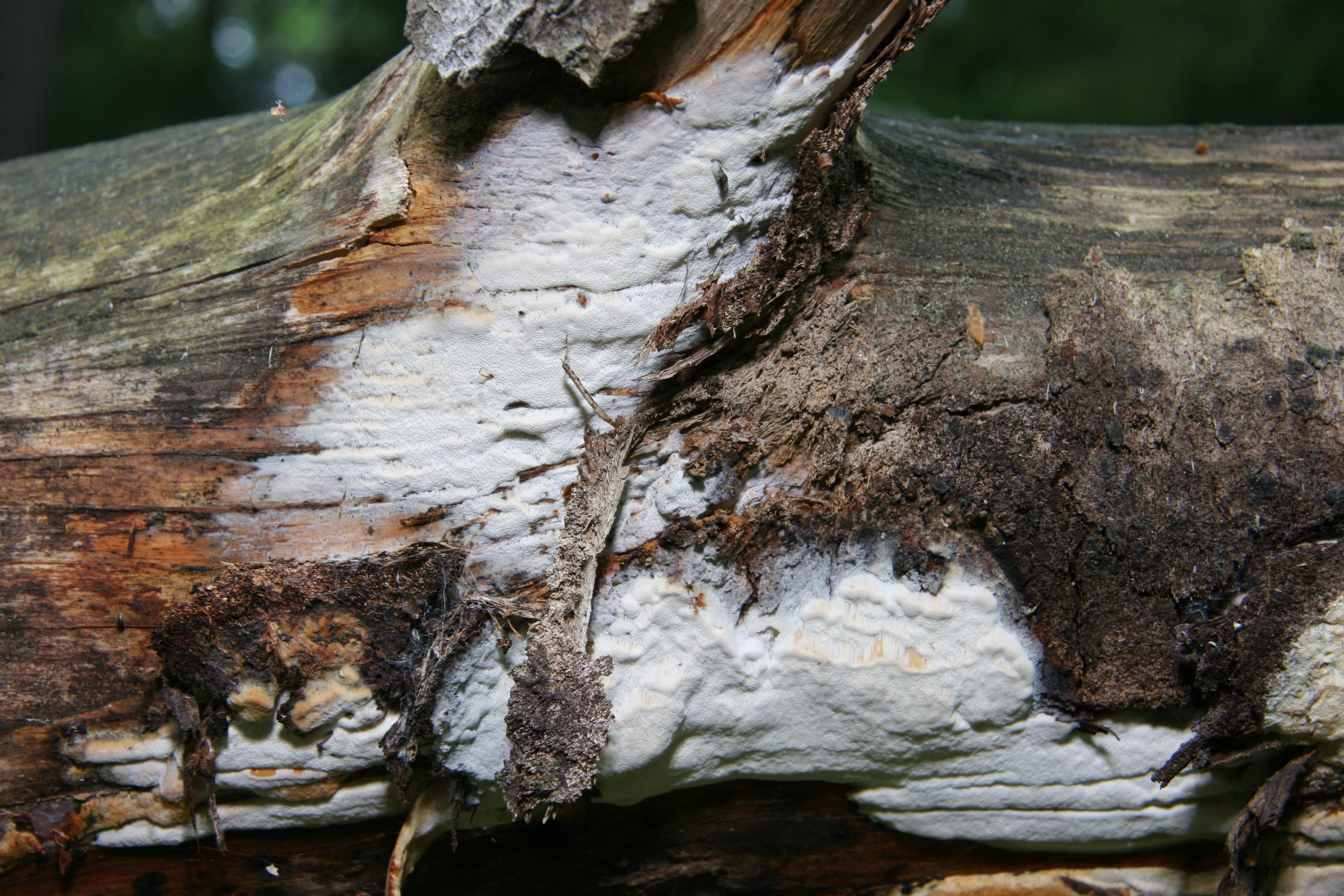

Scientific classification
- Domain: Eukaryota
- Kingdom: Fungi
- Division: Basidiomycota
- Class: Agaricomycetes
- Order: Polyporales
- Family: Fomitopsidaceae
- Genus: Flavidoporia
- Species: F. pulvinascens

Binomial name
- Flavidoporia pulvinascens (Pilát) Audet (2017)

Synonyms
- Poria pulvinascens Pilát (1953); Antrodia pulvinascens (Pilát) Niemelä (1985)

= Flavidoporia pulvinascens =

Species of fungus

Flavidoporia pulvinascens is a species of crust fungus that is found in Europe. Czech mycologist Albert Pilát originally described the fungus in 1953 as a species of Poria.
