= Polypore =

Group of fungi

Polypores (Ganoderma sp.) growing on a tree in Borneo

Polypores, also called bracket or shelf fungi, are a morphological group of basidiomycete-like gilled mushrooms and hydnoid fungi that form large fruiting bodies called conks, which are typically woody, circular, shelf- or bracket-shaped, with pores or tubes on the underside.

Conks lie in a close planar grouping of separate or interconnected horizontal rows. Brackets can range from only a single row of a few caps, to dozens of rows of caps that can weigh several hundred pounds. They are mainly found on trees (living and dead) and coarse woody debris, and may resemble mushrooms. Some form annual fruiting bodies while others are perennial and grow larger year after year. Bracket fungi are typically tough and sturdy and produce their spores, called basidiospores, within the pores that typically make up the undersurface.

Most polypores inhabit tree trunks or branches consuming the wood, but some soil-inhabiting species form mycorrhiza with trees. Polypores and the related corticioid fungi are the most important agents of wood decay, playing a very significant role in nutrient cycling and aiding carbon dioxide absorption by forest ecosystems. Several polypore species are serious pathogens of plantation trees and are major causes of timber spoilage.

As polypores are much more diverse in old natural forests with abundant dead wood than in younger managed forests or plantations, a number of species have declined drastically and are under threat of extinction due to logging and deforestation. Polypores are used in traditional medicine, and they are actively studied for various industrial applications.

== Taxonomy ==
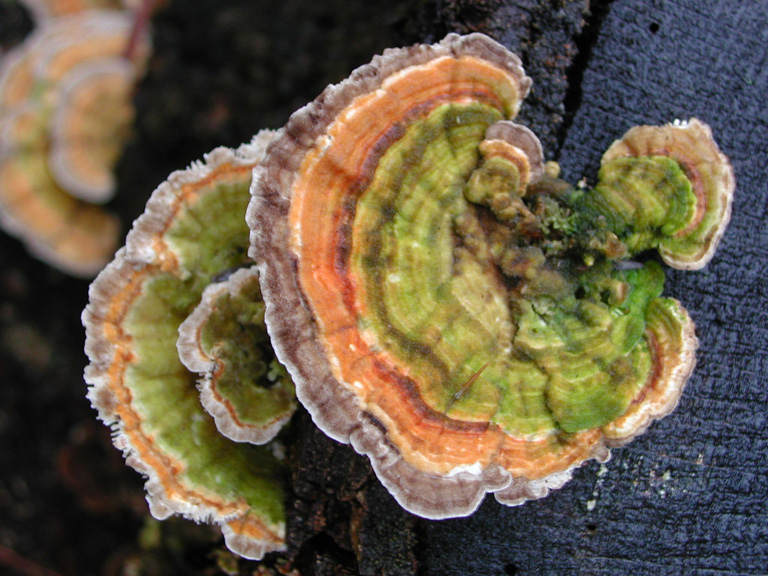
Trametes versicolor, a colorful bracket fungus, commonly known as turkey tail

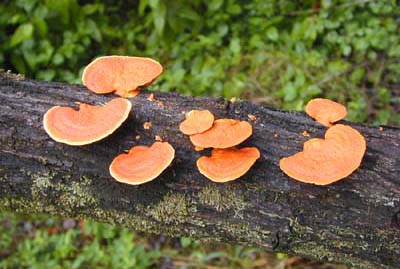
A bracket fungus (Pycnoporus sp.) with a tough, woody cap

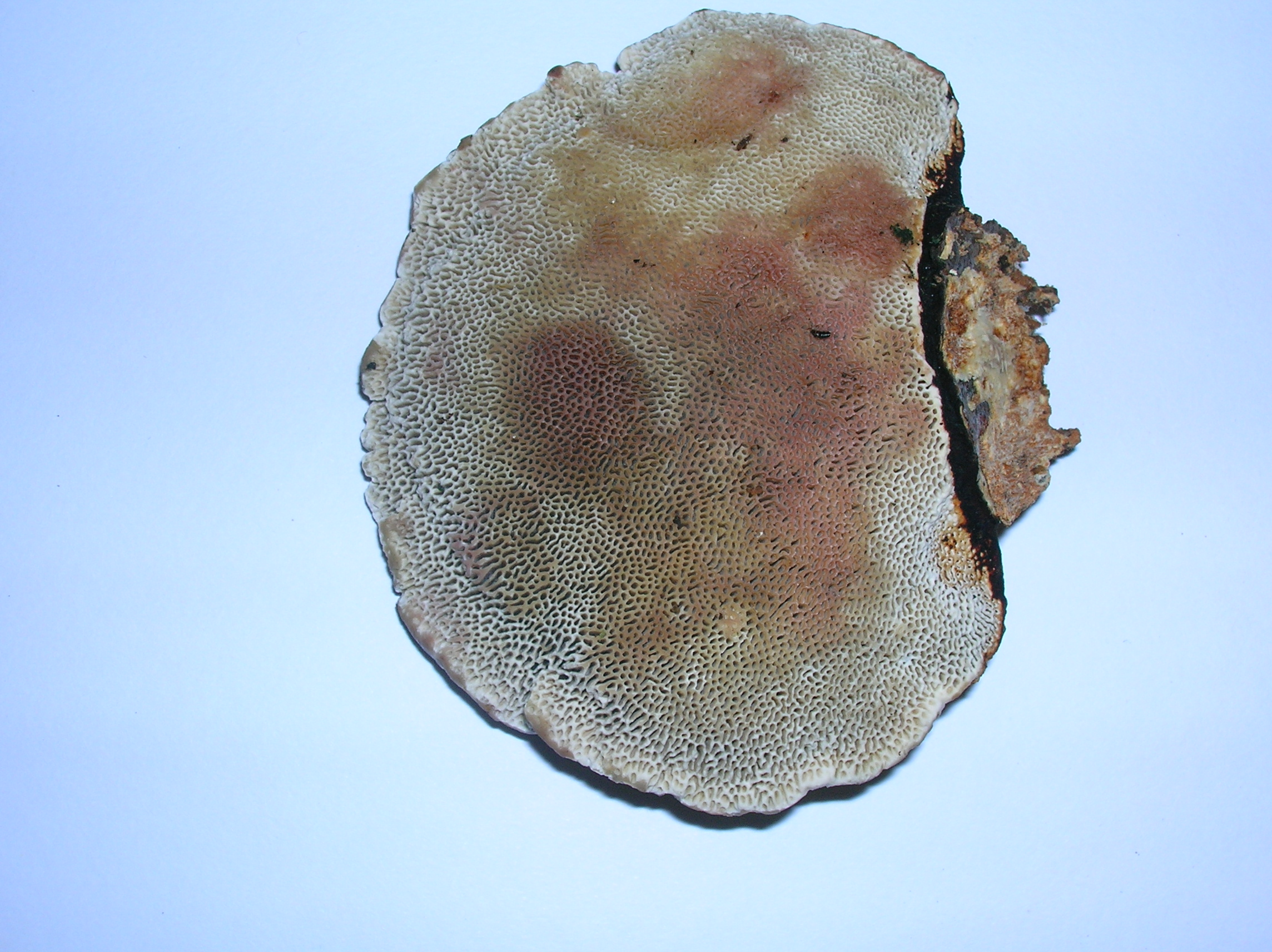
The blushing bracket showing the red bruising, which is one identification characteristic

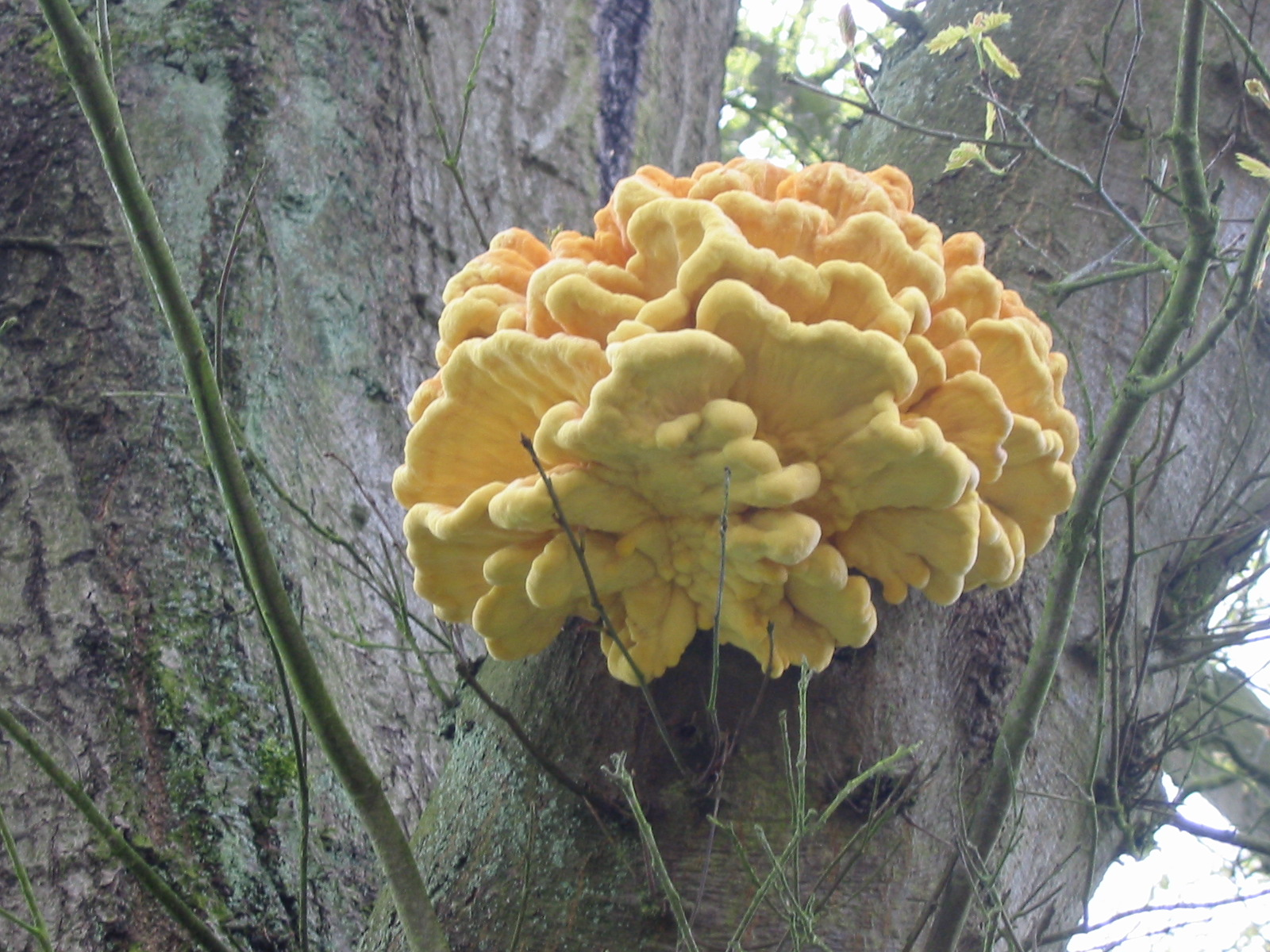
Laetiporus sulphureus

Bracket fungus on tree in Tokyo, Japan

Because bracket fungi are defined by their growth form rather than phylogeny, the group contains members of multiple clades. The beefsteak fungus, a well-known bracket fungus, is actually a member of the agarics. Other examples of bracket fungi include chicken of the woods (or sulphur shelf), birch bracket, dryad's saddle, artist's conk, and turkey tail. The name polypores is often used for a group that includes many of the hard or leathery fungi, which often lack a stipe, growing straight out of wood. "Polypore" is derived from the Greek words poly, meaning "much" or "many", and poros, meaning "pore".

=== Classification ===
For most of 20th century polypores were treated as a family, the Polyporaceae. Reconstructions of family trees of fungi show that the poroid fruiting body has evolved numerous times in the past. Modern DNA-based evolutionary classification places polypores to at least 12 orders. The orders containing most polypore species are the Polyporales (genera such as Fomes, Polyporus and Trametes) and Hymenochaetales (e.g. Oxyporus, Phellinus and Trichaptum). Economically perhaps the most significant polypores Heterobasidion spp., pests of conifer plantations, belong to the Russulales. Other polypore orders are the Agaricales, Amylocorticiales, Auriculariales, Boletales, Cantharellales, Gloeophyllales, Sebacinales, Thelephorales and Trechisporales.

The Polyporales in the modern sense are not only polypores but also other fruiting body types such as crust fungi, hydnoid fungi and agaricoid mushrooms.

Currently polypores are divided into about 170 genera.

== Description ==
Schematic drawing of a pileate polypore fruit body

The fungal individual that develops the fruit bodies that are identified as polypores resides in soil or wood as mycelium. Polypores are often restricted to either deciduous (angiosperm) or conifer (gymnosperm) host trees. Some species depend on a single tree genus (e.g. Piptoporus betulinus on birch, Perenniporia corticola on dipterocarps).

Forms of polypore fruit bodies range from mushroom-shaped to thin effused patches (crusts) that develop on dead wood. Perennial fruit bodies of some species growing on living trees can grow over 80 years old (e.g. Phellinus igniarius). Most species of polypores develop new, short-lived fruit bodies annually or several times every year. Abundant fruit takes place during the autumn or rainy season.

Structure of the fruit bodies is simple. Effused or resupinate fruit bodies typically consist of two layers - a tube layer of vertically arranged tubes that open downwards, and supporting layer called subiculum that supports and attached the tubes to substrate. In fruit bodies with a cap (pileate fruit bodies) the tissue between upper surface and the pore layer is called context. A few polypores (e.g. Fomes fomentarius and Inocutis rhaedes) also have a core between context and substrate. A minority of polypores also have a stalk (stipe) that attach to the cap either laterally or centrally depending on the species.

Polypore tubes are a honeycomb-like structure, where the individual tubes have fused together. Their sides are covered with a spore-forming surface, the hymenium. The tubes offer shelter for developing spores and help to increase the area of the spore-producing surface. Pore size and shape vary a lot between species, but little within a species – some Hexagonia spp. have 5 mm wide pores whereas pores of Antrodiella spp. are invisible to naked eye with 15 pores per mm. Generally the larger the pores, the larger the spores. A few polypores produce asexual spores (chlamydospores or conidia) in the upper surface of their cap (e.g. Echinopora aculeifera, Oligoporus ptychogaster) or without the presence of a sexual fruit body (e.g. Inonotus rickii, Heterobasidion spp.).

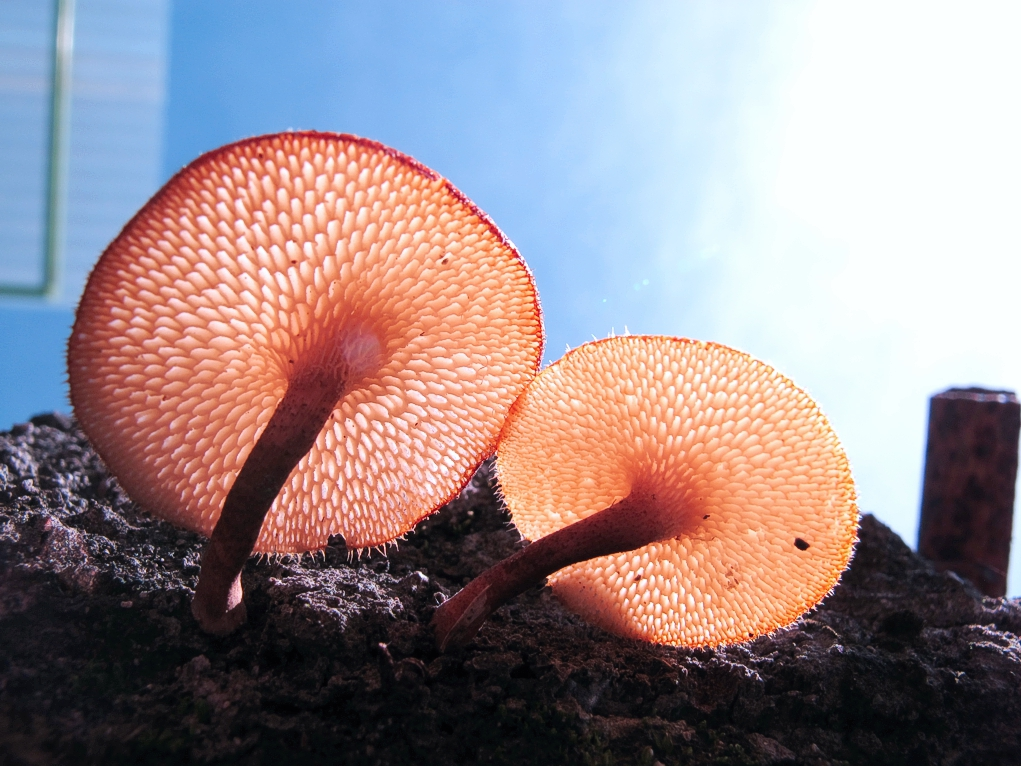
Polyporus sp. fruit bodies with stalk (Indonesia)

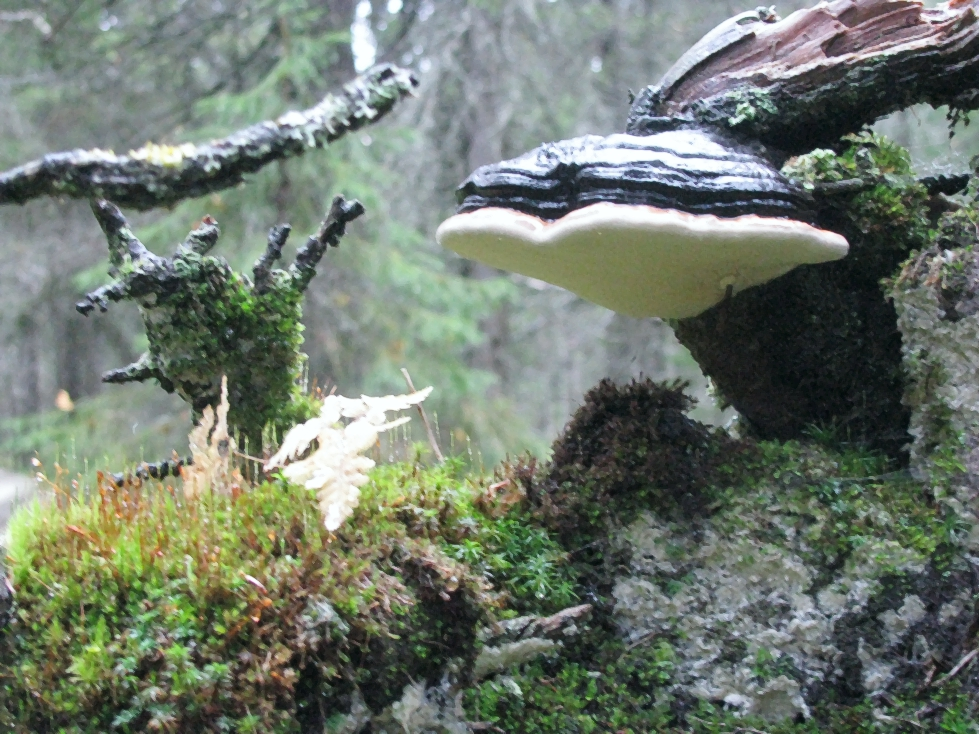
Perennial conk of Fomitopsis pinicola on spruce

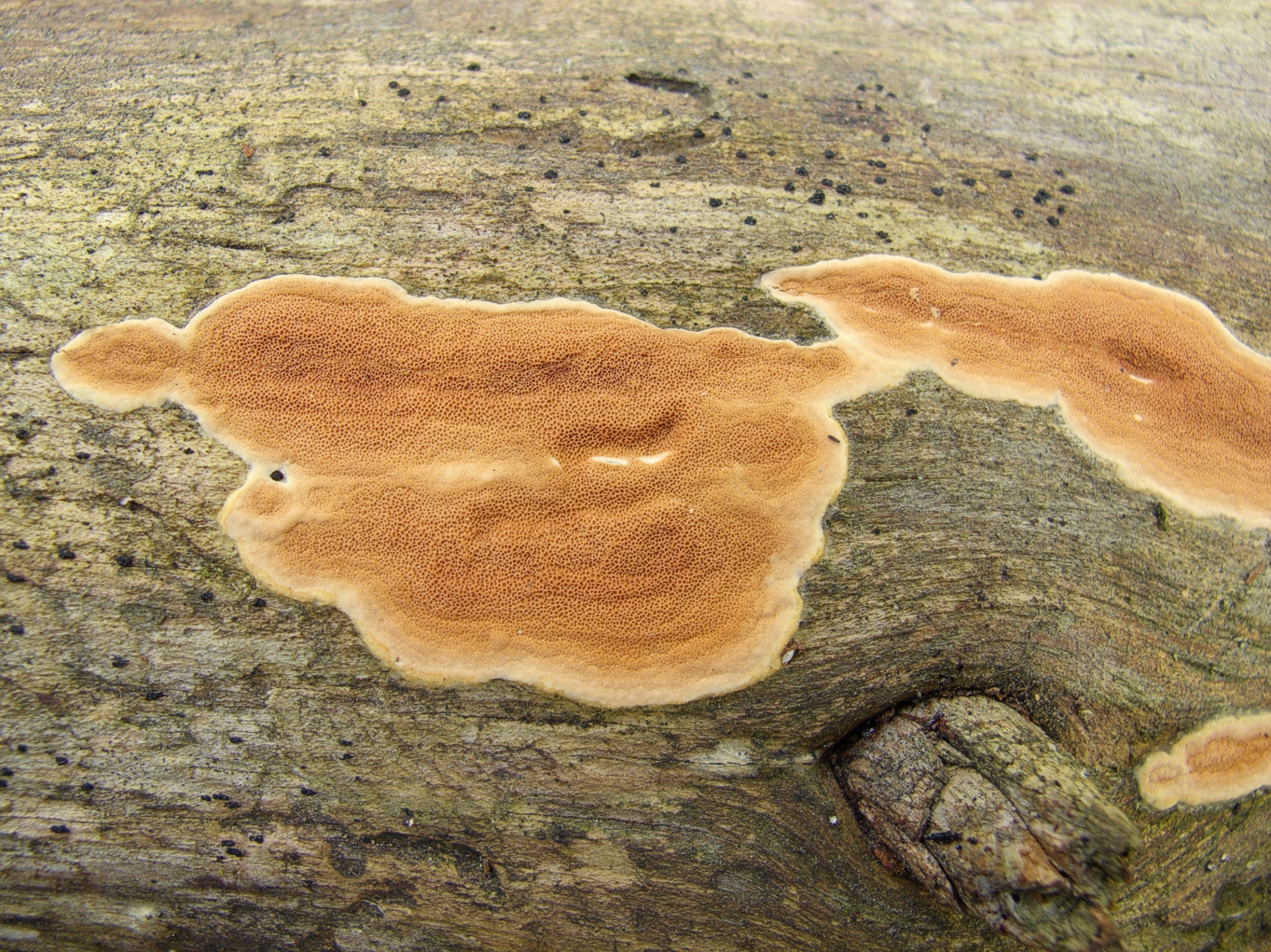
Effused fruit bodies of Meruliopsis taxicola on a pine log

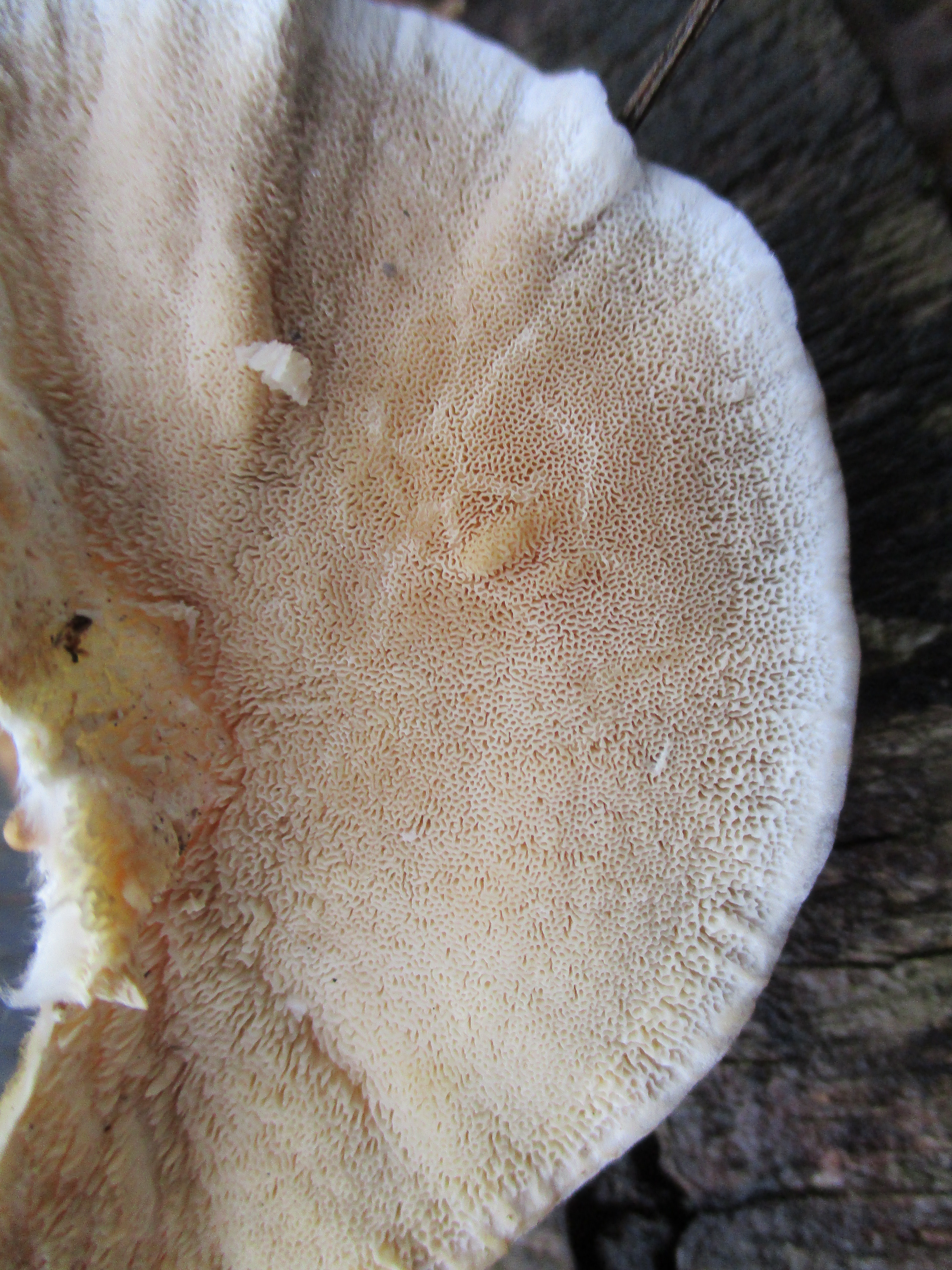
bottom side polypore with pores/tubes clearly visible

=== Delimitation (morphology) ===
Most polypores have a poroid hymenium, but not all species. A few, for instance Elmerina holophaea and Lenzites betulina, form gills like agarics but are still considered polypores, since in all other respects they are similar to closely related polypores, forming tough fruiting bodies on the wood. A couple of species where the tubes have not fused together in a honey-comb manner are variably classified as polypores or not (e.g. Porotheleum fimbriatum). There's no clear distinction between polypores and hydnoid fungi - some polypores with irregularly poroid lower surface have been considered both polypores and hydnoid fungi (e.g. Echinodontium tinctorium, Irpex lacteus).

Bolete mushrooms are a separate morphological group not included in polypores even though they have tubes. Fleshy fruiting bodies with a stalk and microscopic characters separate boletes from polypores.

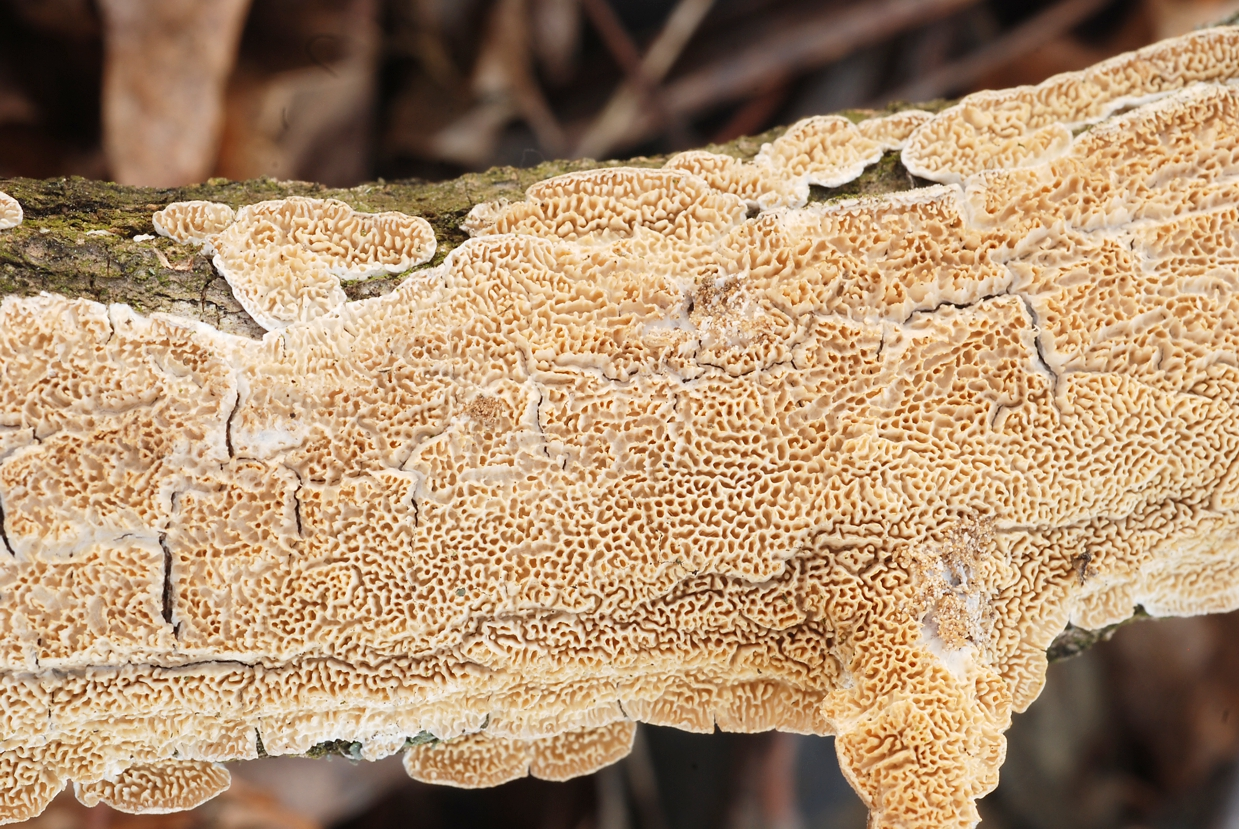
Irpex lacteus with irregular pores

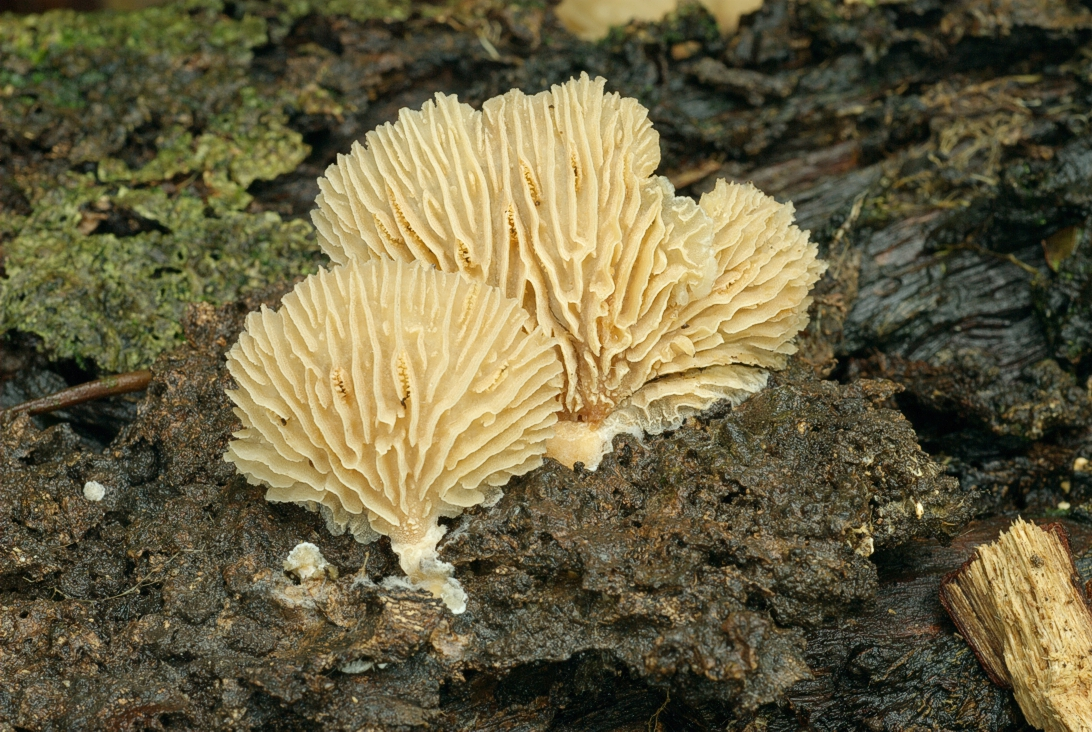
Elmerina holophaea, a polypore with gills

== Ecology ==
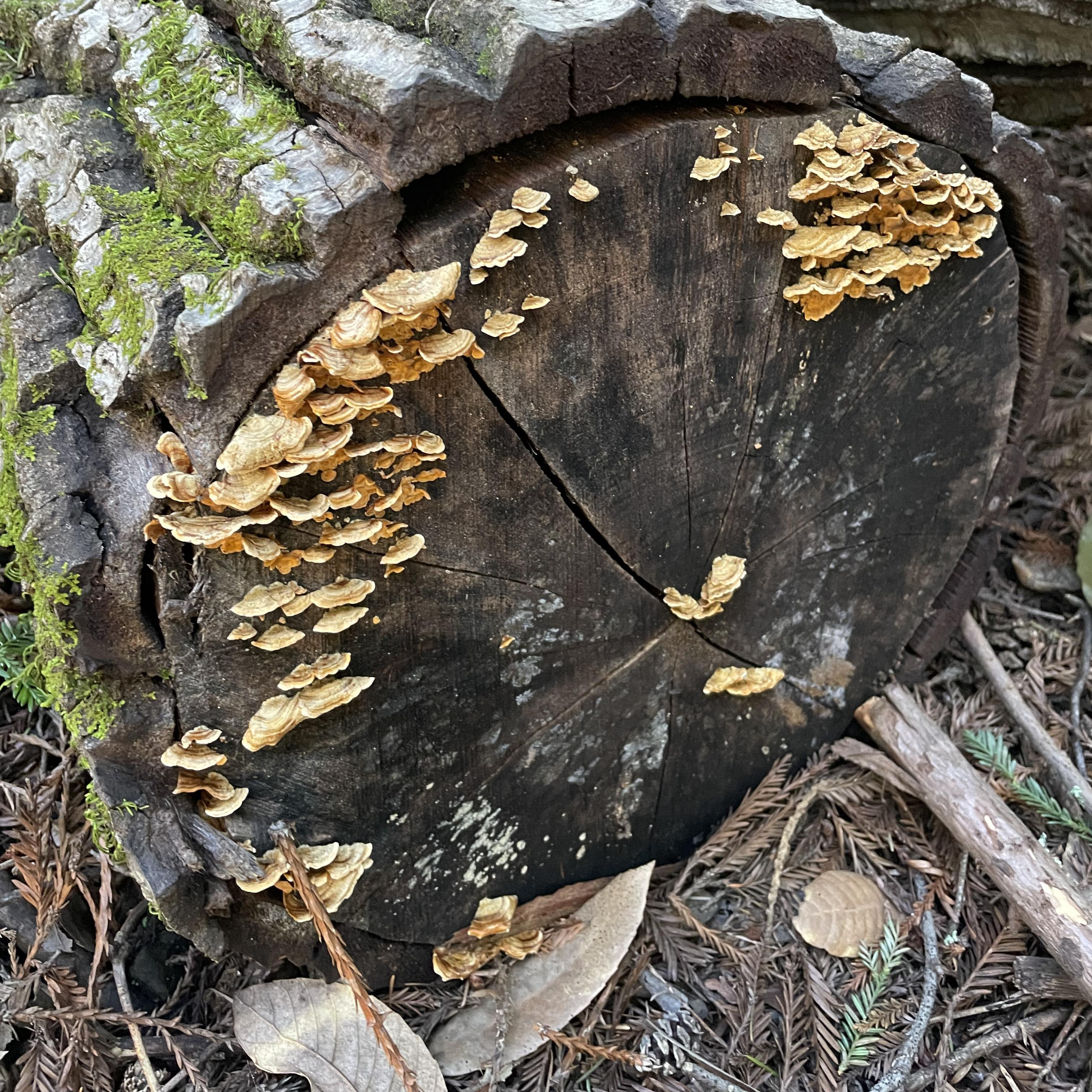
Trametes versicolor growing on a rotting log

Bracket fungi often grow in semi-circular shapes, looking like trees or wood. They can be parasitic, saprotrophic, or both. One of the more common genera, Ganoderma, can grow large thick shelves that may contribute to the death of the tree, and then feed off the wood for years after. Their hardiness means they are very resilient and can live for quite a long time, with many species even developing multi-coloured circles of colour that are actually annual growth rings. Polypores are among the most efficient decomposers of lignin and cellulose, the main components of wood. Due to this ability they dominate communities of wood-rotting organisms in land ecosystems along with corticioid fungi. Through decomposing tree trunks they recycle a major part of nutrients in forests.

Most brown-rot fungi are polypores. Most of these species have lost their lignin degradation ability through evolution but are very efficient in degrading cellulose. Brown-rot fungi are prevalent on conifer hosts and open, sun-exposed habitats. The fungal community in any single trunk may include both white-rot and brown-rot species, complementing each other's wood degradation strategies.

Polypores and other decomposer fungi are the first step in food chains that feed on decomposed plant material. A rich fauna of insects, mites and other invertebrates feed on polypore mycelium and fruiting bodies, further providing food for birds and other larger animals. Woodpeckers and other hole nesting birds typically carve their nests in softer wood decomposed by polypores.

=== Threats ===
Almost all polypores are dependent on trees for their survival. Deforestation and intensive forest management cause declines in polypore abundance and diversity. For many species the changes can be too much, and they start a slow slide towards extinction. Since most polypore species are relatively widespread, this process is typically slow. Regional extinctions can happen relatively quickly and have been documented (for instance Antrodia crassa in North Europe).

Polypores can decline for many reasons. They can be dependent on a single host or a very special habitat. For instance Echinodontium ballouii has been found only in Atlantic white cedar swamps in the Northeastern USA. Species can be dependent on very old tree individuals like Bridgeoporus nobilissimus of the Northwestern USA. Both of these species also have a rather restricted range, making them more vulnerable to extinction.

In addition to the host tree individual, the characteristics of the surrounding habitat also matter. Some species prefer closed-canopy forest with a moist, even microclimate that could be disturbed for instance by logging (e.g. Skeletocutis jelicii). Others suffer from lack of open forest-fire habitat in areas where fire suppression is done (e.g. Gloeophyllum carbonarium in Nordic countries where forest fires are part of the natural forest dynamics).

For most declining species the main problem is lack of dead wood in the forest. When suitable tree trunks are too sparse in the landscape, not all species are able to spread to new trunks after old ones have been consumed, causing the population to decline and eventually vanish. Thus, species that are abundant in old-growth forests with abundant dead wood can be totally absent from managed forests. For instance Amylocystis lapponica and Fomitopsis rosea are dominant species in North European old-growth spruce forests from Poland to Norway, but absent in managed forests.

Climate change may cause a problem for polypores that are already dependent on a few fragments of old-growth forests and may be unable to migrate with changing vegetation.

=== Indicator value ===
Polypores have been used as indicator species of healthy natural forests or old-growth forests in Europe. They are good indicators of invertebrate diversity on dead wood and include many endangered species. Polypores make good indicators because they are relatively easy to find – many species produce conspicuous and long-lasting fruiting bodies – and because they can be identified in the field.

The first indicator list of polypores widely used in forest inventories and conservation work was developed in northern Sweden in 1992 ("Steget före" method). "Steget före" list included six polypores in three value classes. In Finland, a list of 30 species for spruce-dominated forests was published in 1993 and widely adopted. Later a similar list for pine-dominated forests was published. Longer lists of indicator species have since been published in Sweden.

Many indicator species are red-listed, but not necessarily all. National red lists of fungi typically include many polypores and are used as indicator lists of conservation value in many European countries.

== Uses ==
Some species of bracket fungi are edible, such as chicken of the woods; the lingzhi mushroom is another, which is used in Chinese medicine. They can also be used as a wick in an oil/fat lamp.

The tinder fungus (Fomes fomentarius) has been used as tinder since at least the time of Ötzi the Iceman. It has also been used to make a material similar to leather.

Ganoderma applanatum, the artist's conk, is used as a substrate for drawings. Fresh specimens develop dark brown lines when drawn upon with a stylus. The lines become permanent when the specimen is dried.

=== Traditional uses ===
Most polypores are edible or at least non-toxic, although one genus of polypores has members that are poisonous. Polypores from the genus Hapalopilus have caused poisoning in several people with effects including kidney dysfunction and deregulation of central nervous system functions. Some polypores have been used in ritual and for utilitarian purposes for ages; Ötzi the Iceman was found carrying two different polypore species: Piptoporus betulinus and Fomes fomentarius.

Polypores used in traditional medicine are Ganoderma lucidum coll. (reishi or lingzhi), Trametes versicolor (turkey tail) and Ganoderma applanatum.

== See also ==
- Amadou
- Pleurotoid fungi
- Wood-decay fungus
- List of world's largest mushrooms and conks
- Amaropostia stiptica
