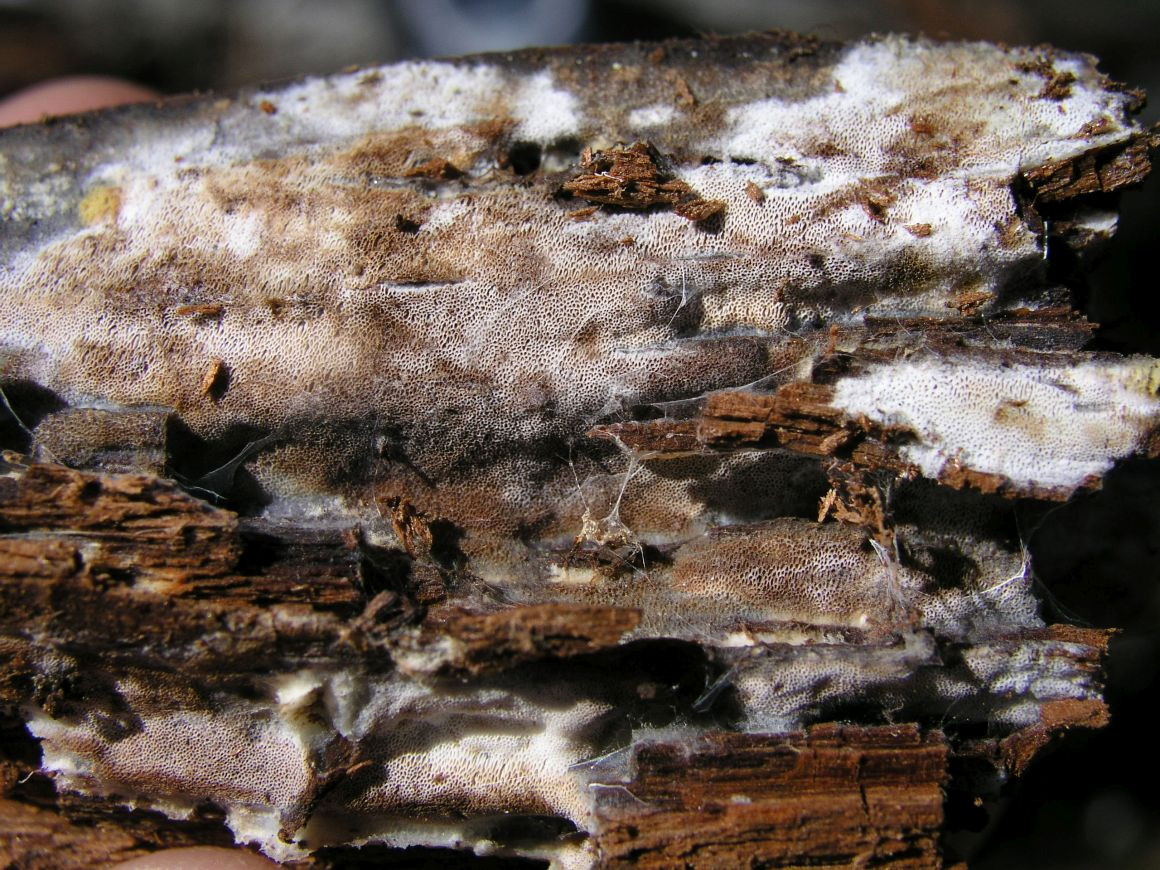

Scientific classification
- Kingdom: Fungi
- Division: Basidiomycota
- Class: Agaricomycetes
- Order: Polyporales
- Family: Phanerochaetaceae
- Genus: Ceriporiopsis
- Species: C. jelicii

Binomial name
- Ceriporiopsis jelicii (Tortič & A. David) Ryvarden & Gilb

Synonyms
- Skeletocutis jelicii Tortic & A.David, 1981; Skeletocutis jelicii (Tortic & A.David) Ryvarden & Gilb.

= Ceriporiopsis jelicii =

Species of fungus

Ceriporiopsis jelicii is a species of fungus belonging to the family Phanerochaetaceae.
