= Resinoporia crassa =

Scientific classification
- Kingdom: Fungi
- Division: Basidiomycota
- Class: Agaricomycetes
- Order: Polyporales
- Family: Fomitopsidaceae
- Genus: Resinoporia
- Species: R. crassa

Binomial name
- Resinoporia crassa (P.Karst.) Audet (2017)

Synonyms
- Physisporus crassus P.Karst. (1889); Antrodia crassa (P.Karst.) Ryvarden (1973)

Species of fungus

Resinoporia crassa is a species of fungus belonging to the family Fomitopsidaceae.

It is found in Europe and North America.
