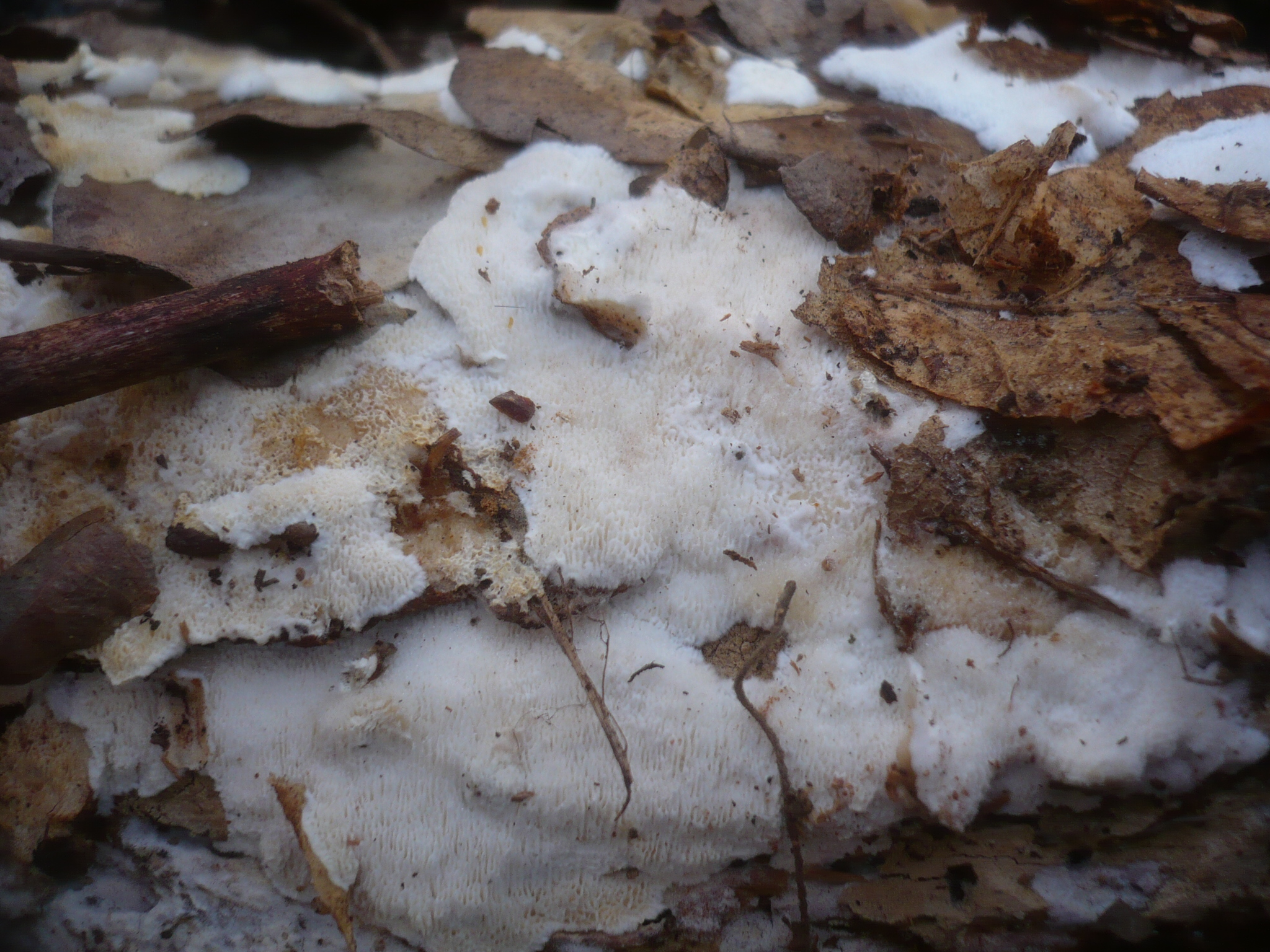

Scientific classification
- Kingdom: Fungi
- Division: Basidiomycota
- Class: Agaricomycetes
- Order: Hymenochaetales
- Family: Repetobasidiaceae
- Genus: Sidera
- Species: S. lenis

Binomial name
- Sidera lenis (P. Karsten) Miettinen, 2011

= Sidera lenis =

Species of fungus

Sidera lenis is a species of fungus belonging to the family Rickenellaceae.

Synonym:

- Physisporus lenis P.Karst, 1886 (= basionym)
