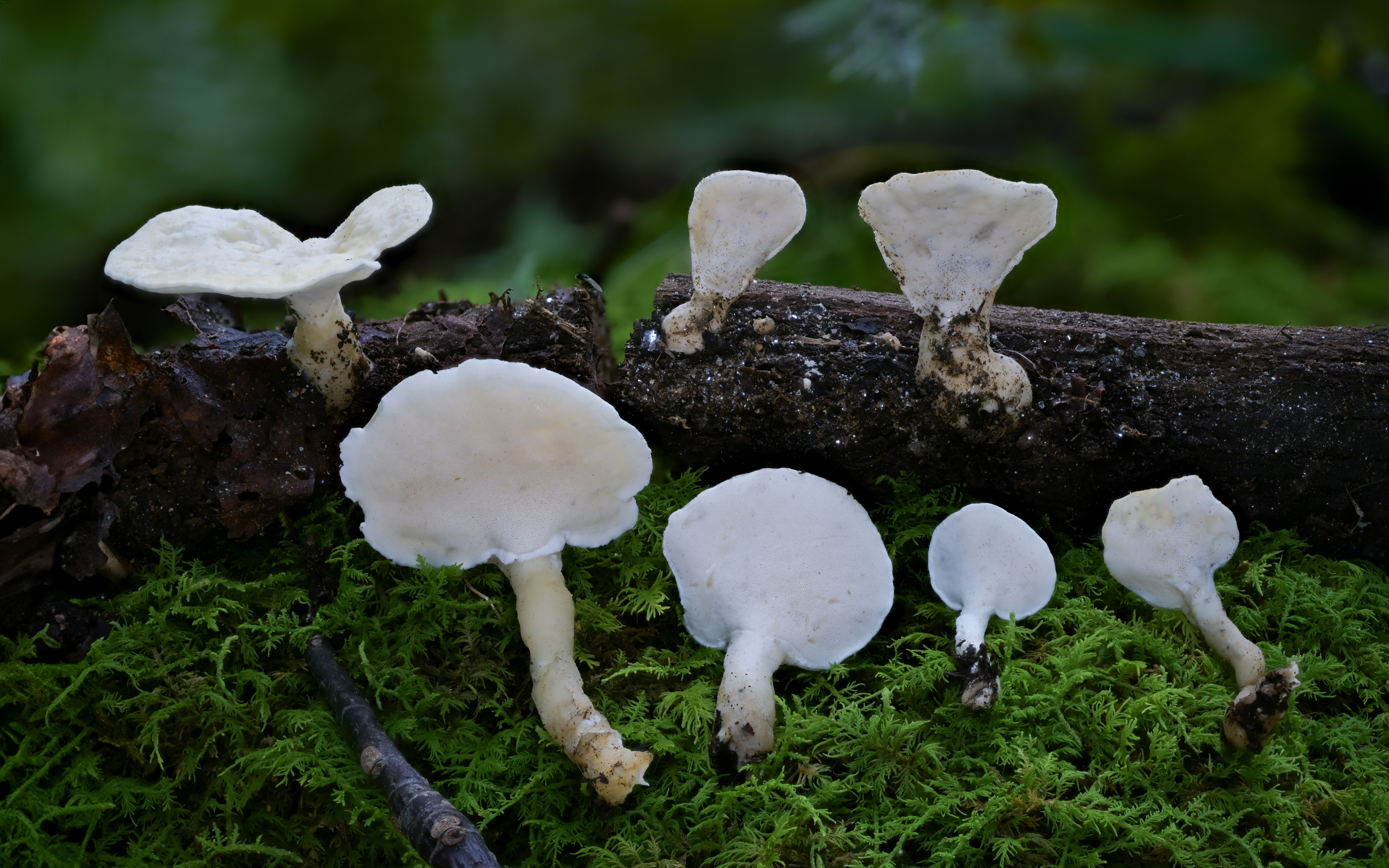
- Loweomyces fractipes

Scientific classification
- Kingdom: Fungi
- Division: Basidiomycota
- Class: Agaricomycetes
- Order: Polyporales
- Family: Steccherinaceae
- Genus: Loweomyces
- Species: L. fractipes

Binomial name
- Loweomyces fractipes (Berk. & M.A.Curtis) Jülich (1982)

Synonyms
- Polyporus fractipes Berk. & M.A.Curtis (1872); Grifola fractipes (Berk. & M.A.Curtis) Murrill (1904); Polypilus fractipes (Berk. & M.A.Curtis) Bondartsev & Singer (1941); Abortiporus fractipes (Berk. & M.A.Curtis) Bondartsev (1959); Spongipellis fractipes (Berk. & M.A.Curtis) Komarova (1964); Heteroporus fractipes (Berk. & M.A.Curtis) O.Fidalgo (1969); Spongipellis fractipes (Berk. & M.A.Curtis) Kotl. & Pouzar (1976); Abortiporus fractipes (Berk. & M.A.Curtis) Gilb. & Ryvarden (1986)

= Loweomyces fractipes =

Species of fungus

Loweomyces fractipes is a species of poroid fungus in the family Steccherinaceae, and the type species of the genus Loweomyces. It is a widely distributed species, found in North America, Europe, Central America, South America, and Korea.

== Taxonomy ==
The fungus was originally described in 1872 as Polypores fractipes by Miles Berkeley and Moses Ashley Curtis. The type specimens had been sent to Berkeley by American botanist Henry William Ravenel. It has been transferred to many different polypore genera in its taxonomic history. William Murrill moved it to Grifola in 1904, while it was later transferred to Abortiporus (Bondartsev, 1959), Heteroporus (Fidalgo, 1969), and Spongipellis (Kotlaba & Pouzar, 1976). In 1982, Walter Jülich transferred it to Loweomyces, originally a subgenus of Spongipellis but elevated to generic status by Jülich.

Heterotypic synonyms (having different types) of Loweomyces fractipes include Abortiporus tropicalis Murrill (1910), Polyporus delicatus Berk. & M.A.Curtis (1872), and Polyporus humilis Peck (1874).

== Description ==
The fruit bodies of Loweomyces fractipes can be quite variable in form. The stipe is placed centrally to laterally, dimidiate with fan- to kidney-shaped caps or almost effused-reflexed, 1–4 cm wide, 1–5 mm thick, soft when fresh, brittle when dry. The upper surface of the cap is white in young specimens, but becomes yellowish with age, at first finely tomentose, with age more adpressed and semi-glabrous, often somewhat wrinkled, usually azonate. When the stipe is present it is white to yellowish, measuring up to 4 cm long, and it is cylindric to flattened and expanded towards the cap. The colour of the pore surface is white to cream, and consists of tiny, angular pores numbering 4–5 per millimetre. The context in cap and stipe are white and comprise two layers: a hard inner or lower layer that is covered with a much looser layer, which may be agglutinated on the surface with age. The tube layer is the same colour as the pore surface, and up to 3 mm thick.

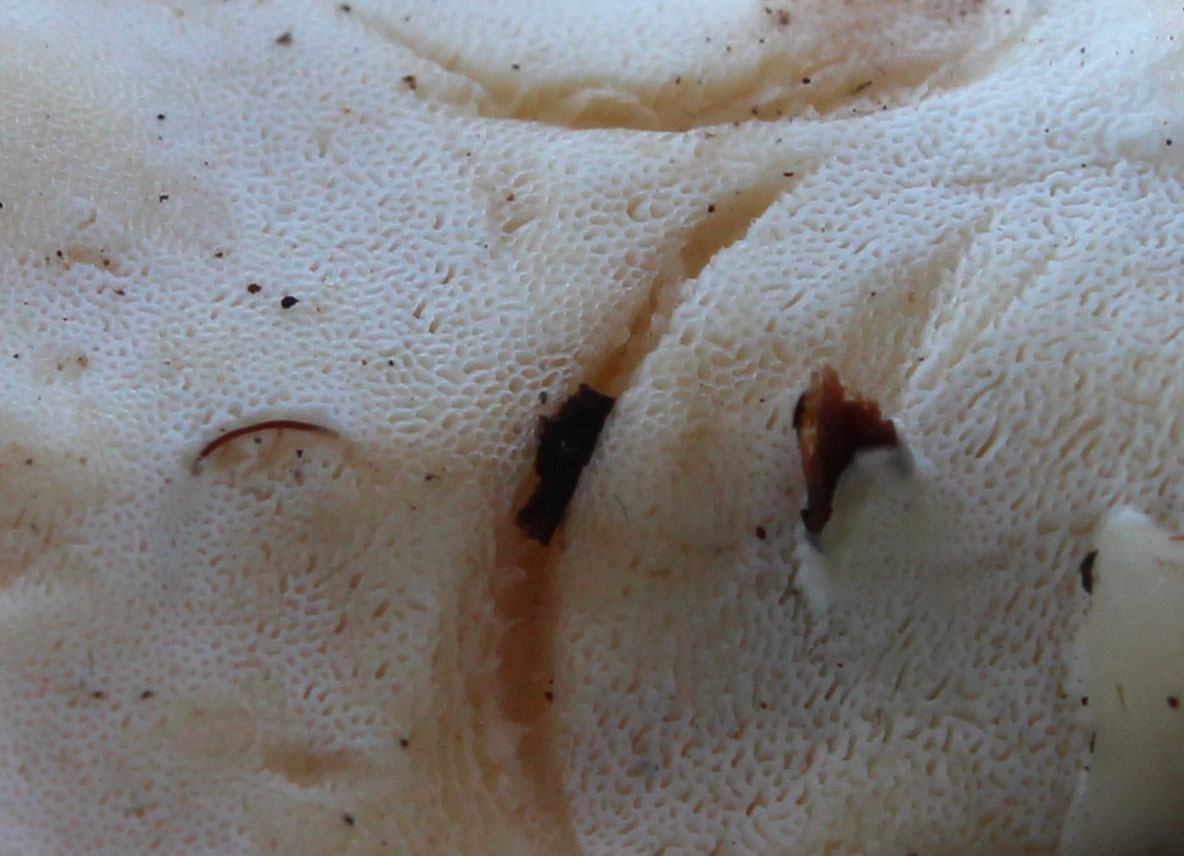
Closeup of pore surface

The hyphal system is monomitic, containing only generative hyphae. These hyphae have clamp connections, which in the subhymenium and trama are thin-walled and 3–5 μm in diameter. In the context and especially the stipe, the hyphae are much more thick-walled and reminiscent of skeletal hyphae, but with scattered clamps. These hyphae are interpreted by Ryvarden as sclerified generative hyphae. Cystidia are variably present in the hymenium. They are often difficult to observe during microscopy. Their shape is ventricose to cylindrical, and they are thin-walled, measuring 15–25 by 5–6.5 μm. The basidia are broadly club-shaped, and have four sterigmata. They have a basal clamp, and measure 15–20 by 6–9 μm. The shape of the spores ranges from broadly ellipsoid to egg-shaped to more or less spherical, and measure 4.5–6 by 4–5 μm. They are slightly thick-walled, smooth, hyaline (translucent), and are non-reactive with Melzer's reagent.

== Habitat and distribution ==
Loweomyces fractipes is found in Europe, North America, Costa Rica, South America (Brazil), and Korea.
