= Trulla =

Scientific classification
- Kingdom: Fungi
- Division: Basidiomycota
- Class: Agaricomycetes
- Order: Polyporales
- Family: Steccherinaceae
- Genus: Trulla; Miettinen & Ryvarden (2016)

Type species
- Trulla dentipora (Ryvarden & Iturr.) Miettinen & Ryvarden (2016)

Genus of fungi

Trulla is a fungal genus in the family Steccherinaceae containing six species of polypores. It was circumscribed by mycologists Otto Miettinen and Leif Ryvarden in 2016, as a continuation of prior work that outlined a revised framework for the Steccherinaceae based on molecular phylogenetics. Its closest relative in the Steccherinaceae is the genus Nigroporus, from which it differs in its light-coloured fruit bodies and monomitic context.

The generic name Trulla, from the Latin word for a type of pan with handle (for which see Staffordshire Moorlands Pan), alludes to the spatulate (spoon-like) shape of the fruit bodies. Microscopic characteristics of the genus include spores that are curved and cylindrical, cyanophilic skeletal hyphae (staining blue if the microscopic stain Lactophenol Cotton Blue is applied) and slightly thick-walled, wide generative hyphae in the context.

== Species ==
Trulla contains six species that were transferred from various other polypore genera, including Antrodiella, Polyporus, Leptoporus, Coriolus, and Tyromyces. Additional phylogenetic analysis may reveal more species hidden in the T. duracina species complex.

- Trulla crustulina (Bres.) Miettinen (2016)
- Trulla dentipora (Ryvarden & Iturr.) Miettinen & Ryvarden (2016)
- Trulla duracina (Pat.) Miettinen (2016)
- Trulla meridae Miettinen & Ryvarden (2016)
- Trulla ochrotinctella (Murrill) Miettinen (2016)
- Trulla polyporoides (Ryvarden & Iturr.) Miettinen & Ryvarden (2016)

== Distribution ==
Most species of Trulla are found in tropical areas, although in some cases the distribution extends to south temperate regions in North America and Asia. Like all members of the Steccherinaceae, Trulla are wood-decay fungi that cause a white rot in dead wood.
