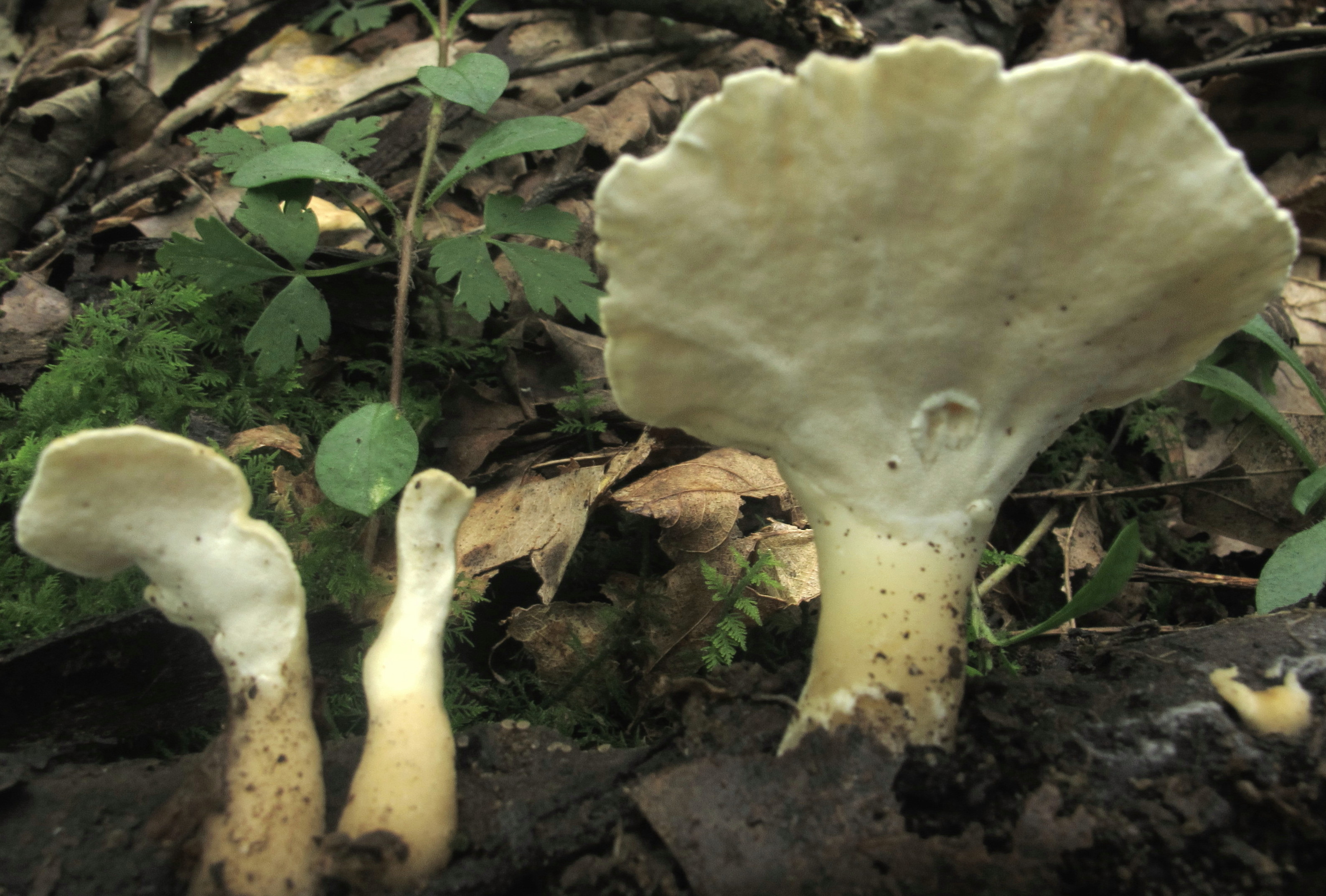
- Loweomyces fractipes

Scientific classification
- Kingdom: Fungi
- Division: Basidiomycota
- Class: Agaricomycetes
- Order: Polyporales
- Family: Steccherinaceae
- Genus: Loweomyces (Kotl. & Pouzar) Jülich (1982)

Type species
- Loweomyces fractipes (Berk. & M.A.Curtis) Jülich (1982)

Species
- L. fractipes L. sibiricus L. spissus L. subgiganteus L. tomentosus L. wynneae

Synonyms
- Spongipellis subgen. Loweomyces Kotlába & Pouzar (1976)

= Loweomyces =

Genus of fungi

Loweomyces is a genus of six species of poroid fungi in the family Steccherinaceae (formerly placed in the Meruliaceae).

== Taxonomy ==
It was originally circumscribed as a subgenus of Spongipellis by the Czech mycologists František Kotlaba and Zdeněk Pouzar in 1976. Swiss mycologist Walter Jülich promoted it to a genus segregate from Spongipellis in 1982, with two species: L. fractipes (the type), and L. wynneae. Jülich thought the genus should be distinct from Spongipellis based on the larger basidia, the absence of skeletal hyphae, and smaller tubes. L. fractipes and L. wynneae have had their generic positions confirmed with molecular phylogenetics, and both group in the "residual polyploid clade", one of four main lineages of the Polyporales. The genus is named in honour of American mycologist and polypore specialist Josiah Lincoln Lowe.

== Description ==
Loweomyces is distinguished by the ease of spore germination in growth media, larger basidia, the absence of skeletal hyphae, and smaller tubes, plates or spines, compared with European Spongipellis species. Fruit bodies are either crust-like or have a cap and stipe. The hyphal system is either monomitic (possessing only generative hyphae) or dimitic (having both generative and pseudo-skeletal hyphae).

== Species ==
The genus contained four species as of January 2015. Two new species from Brazil were described in 2016.

- Loweomyces fractipes (Berk. & M.A.Curtis) Jülich (1982) – Europe; North America
- Loweomyces sibiricus (Penzina & Ryvarden) (Spirin 2006)
- Loweomyces spissus Westphalen, Tomšovský & Rajchenb. (2016) – Brazil
- Loweomyces subgiganteus (Berk. & M.A.Curtis) (Spirin 2006)
- Loweomyces tomentosus Westphalen, Tomšovský & Rajchenb. (2016)– Brazil
- Loweomyces wynneae (Berk. & Broome) Jülich (1982) – Europe
