= Antrodiella indica =

Scientific classification
- Domain: Eukaryota
- Kingdom: Fungi
- Division: Basidiomycota
- Class: Agaricomycetes
- Order: Polyporales
- Family: Steccherinaceae
- Genus: Antrodiella
- Species: A. indica

Binomial name
- Antrodiella indica G.Kaur, Avneet P.Singh & Dhingra (2015)

Species of fungus

Antrodiella indica is a species of fungus in the family Steccherinaceae. Found in Chandigarh, India, it was described as new to science in 2015. It is similar to Antrodiella romellii, from which it can be distinguished by its smaller spores, which measure 3.5 by 2.5 μm.
