= Antrodiella nanospora =

Scientific classification
- Kingdom: Fungi
- Division: Basidiomycota
- Class: Agaricomycetes
- Order: Polyporales
- Family: Steccherinaceae
- Genus: Antrodiella
- Species: A. nanospora

Binomial name
- Antrodiella nanospora H.S.Yuan (2018)

Species of fungus

Antrodiella nanospora is a species of crust fungus in the family Steccherinaceae. Found in China, it was described as new to science in 2018 by mycologist Hai-Sheng Yuan. The type collection was made in Maoershan Nature Reserve (Xing'an County, Guangxi), where it was found growing on a fallen angiosperm branch. The specific epithet nanospora refers to its small spores, which measure 2.9–3.2 by 1.8–2.1 μm. The fungus has a dimitic hyphal system, and its generative hyphae have clamp connections. It is similar in appearance to Antrodiella minutispora, but Antrodiella minutispora has a thicker and fleshier fruit body, larger pores, and does not have cystidioles in the hymenium.
