= Antrodiella canadensis =

Scientific classification
- Domain: Eukaryota
- Kingdom: Fungi
- Division: Basidiomycota
- Class: Agaricomycetes
- Order: Polyporales
- Family: Steccherinaceae
- Genus: Antrodiella
- Species: A. canadensis

Binomial name
- Antrodiella canadensis (Overh.) Niemelä, 2005

Species of fungus

Antrodiella canadensis is a species of fungus belonging to the family Phanerochaetaceae.

Synonym:

- Tyromyces canadensis (Overh. ex J.Lowe) J.Lowe, 1975
