= Nigroporus macroporus =

Scientific classification
- Kingdom: Fungi
- Division: Basidiomycota
- Class: Agaricomycetes
- Order: Polyporales
- Family: Steccherinaceae
- Genus: Nigroporus
- Species: N. macroporus

Binomial name
- Nigroporus macroporus Ryvarden & Iturr. (2003)

Species of fungus

Nigroporus macroporus is a species of poroid fungus in the family Steccherinaceae. It was described as new to science in 2003 by mycologists Leif Ryvarden and Teresa Iturriaga. Found in Venezuela and Brazil, it is a wood-decay fungus that causes a white rot in the hardwood Dimorphandra macrostachya.

== Description ==
Fruit bodies of the fungus are bracket-like with a semicircular dark brown to black cap measuring up to 5 cm (2 in) wide, 2–10 cm (0.8–3.9 in) long, and 1 cm (0.4 in) thick. They have a leathery texture when fresh that becomes dry and woody in age. The dark brown pore surface comprises pores numbering 1–2 per millimetre, or fewer on decurrent parts where the pores get stretched out. The spores of N. macroporus are cylindrical, smooth and thin-walled, hyaline, and measure 5–6 by 1.7–2 μm.

The neotropical species Nigroporus rigidus is quite similar in appearance to N. macroporus, but the former species has much smaller pores, numbering 7–9 per millimetre.
