= Mycorrhaphium stereoides =

Scientific classification
- Kingdom: Fungi
- Division: Basidiomycota
- Class: Agaricomycetes
- Order: Polyporales
- Family: Steccherinaceae
- Genus: Mycorrhaphium
- Species: M. stereoides

Binomial name
- Mycorrhaphium stereoides (Cooke) Maas Geest. (1971)

Synonyms
- Hydnum stereoides Cooke (1892); Hydnum insulare Pat. (1914); Mycorrhaphium insulare (Pat.) Maas Geest. (1967)

Species of fungus

Mycorrhaphium stereoides is a species of tooth fungus in the family Steccherinaceae. The fungus was first described by Mordecai Cubitt Cooke in 1892 as Hydnum stereoides. The original specimens were collected in Perak, Malaysia, where they were found growing on a tree trunk. Rudolph Arnold Maas Geesteranus transferred it to the genus Mycorrhaphium in 1971.
