= Trulla dentipora =

Scientific classification
- Kingdom: Fungi
- Division: Basidiomycota
- Class: Agaricomycetes
- Order: Polyporales
- Family: Steccherinaceae
- Genus: Trulla
- Species: T. dentipora

Binomial name
- Trulla dentipora (Ryvarden & Iturr.) Miettinen & Ryvarden (2016)

Synonyms
- Antrodiella dentipora Ryvarden & Iturr. (2004)

Species of fungus

Trulla dentipora is a neotropical polypore fungus in the family Steccherinaceae, and the type species of the genus Trulla. Characteristics of this species are the irregularly shaped pores with jagged or teeth-like edges, and the sausage-shaped spores. Found in Venezuela, the fungus was originally described by mycologists Leif Ryvarden and Teresa Iturriaga in 2004 as a species of Antrodiella. The type was collected in Henri Pittier National Park, where it was found growing on a hardwood log. Ryvarden and Otto Miettinen transferred the fungus to the newly created Trulla in 2016.
