= Mycorrhaphium sessile =

Scientific classification
- Kingdom: Fungi
- Division: Basidiomycota
- Class: Agaricomycetes
- Order: Polyporales
- Family: Steccherinaceae
- Genus: Mycorrhaphium
- Species: M. sessile

Binomial name
- Mycorrhaphium sessile H.S.Yuan & Y.C.Dai

Species of fungus

Mycorrhaphium sessile is a species of tooth fungus in the family Steccherinaceae that is found in China. It was described as a new species in 2009 by mycologists Hai-Sheng Yuan and Yu-Cheng Dai. The type collection was made in Yunnan, where it was found fruiting on a fallen branch.
