= Antella niemelaei =

Scientific classification
- Kingdom: Fungi
- Division: Basidiomycota
- Class: Agaricomycetes
- Order: Polyporales
- Family: Steccherinaceae
- Genus: Antella
- Species: A. niemelaei

Binomial name
- Antella niemelaei (Vampola & Vlasák) Miettinen (2016)

Synonyms
- Antrodiella niemelaei Vampola & Vlasák (2011)

Species of fungus

Antella niemelaei is a species of poroid crust fungus in the family Steccherinaceae.

== Taxonomy ==
Antella niemelaei was formally described as new to science in 2011 as a member of Antrodiella. The specific epithet niemelaei honours Finnish mycologist Tuomo Niemelä, who made the first documented collections of this fungus in 1985. In 2016, Otto Miettinen transferred the species to the new genus Antella, in which it is the type species.

== Description ==
Antella niemelaei is a European species that grows as a thin (about 0.5 mm thick), cream-coloured crust on dead hardwoods, especially on or around the dead fruit bodies of the polypore Hymenochaetopsis tabacina. It has small circular pores numbering about 4 per mm. The hyphal system is dimitic, with thin-walled generative hyphae having clamp connections, and thick-walled skeletal hyphae. Both hyphal types measure 2–4 μm wide. The spores produced by the fungus are thin-walled, hyaline, and ellipsoid, measuring 2.8–4 by 1.8–2.2 μm.
