= Mycorrhaphium pusillum =

Scientific classification
- Kingdom: Fungi
- Division: Basidiomycota
- Class: Agaricomycetes
- Order: Polyporales
- Family: Steccherinaceae
- Genus: Mycorrhaphium
- Species: M. pusillum

Binomial name
- Mycorrhaphium pusillum (Brot.) Maas Geest. (1962)

Synonyms
- Hydnum pusillum Brot. (1805); Sistotrema confluens subsp. pusillum (Brot.) Pers. (1825); Hydnellum pusillum (Brot.) P.Karst. (1879); Steccherinum pusillum (Brot.) Banker (1906); Mycoleptodonoides pusilla (Brot.) K.A.Harrison (1973)

Species of fungus

Mycorrhaphium pusillum is a species of tooth fungus in the family Steccherinaceae. It is a rare European fungus that has only been officially recorded a few times.

== Taxonomy ==
The fungus was originally described as a species of Hydnum by Portuguese botanist Félix Avelar Brotero in 1804. Rudolph Arnold Maas Geesteranus transferred it to the newly created genus Mycorrhaphium in 1962. It has also been placed in Hydnellum by Petter Karsten in 1879, and Steccherinum by Howard James Banker in 1906.

== Description ==
Mycorrhaphium pusillum has a small fruit body with a rounded to fan-shaped cap measuring 12–19 mm (0.5–0.7 in) in diameter. Sometimes neighbouring caps fuse together during growth to make a larger conglomerate. The cap colour is pale cream to pale yellowish, sometimes with regions that are pale brown. The pale cream stipe is 15–21 mm (0.6–0.8 in) long and 1–3 mm (0.04–0.12 in) thick. Spines on the underside of the cap are slender, numbering about 7 or 8 per millimetre, and are about a mm long. The mushroom has no distinct odour.

The spores of M. pusillum are thin walled and more or less cylindrical, typically measuring 2.9–3.6 by 1.9–2.2 μm. They usually contain an oil droplet. The hyphal system of the context is monomitic (containing only loosely arranged generative hyphae), although in the spines it is dimitic. The skeletal hyphae in the spines are thick walled, sometimes so much that they are almost solid, or with a small lumen. They are densely arranged in a parallel fashion, and usually measure 3.7–4.9 μm in diameter.

== Habitat and distribution ==
A rare fungus, Mycorrhaphium pusillum is found only in Europe. It has been collected only a few times in southern and central Europe, and the first northern European collections were reported in 2015. In these latter collections, it was found fruiting on mossy ground in forest dominated by birch trees.
