= Antrodiella tuberculata =

Scientific classification
- Domain: Eukaryota
- Kingdom: Fungi
- Division: Basidiomycota
- Class: Agaricomycetes
- Order: Polyporales
- Family: Steccherinaceae
- Genus: Antrodiella
- Species: A. tuberculata

Binomial name
- Antrodiella tuberculata Ryvarden & Guzmán (2001)

Species of fungus

Antrodiella tuberculata is a species of fungus in the family Steccherinaceae. Found in Mexico, it was described as new to science in 2001 by mycologists Leif Ryvarden and Gastón Guzmán. The type collection was made in Totutla (Veracruz), where it was found fruiting on a dead coniferous log. Characteristics of the fungus include its densely tuberculate cap, and spores that are small (measuring 3–3.5 by 2–2.5 μm) and roughly spherical.
