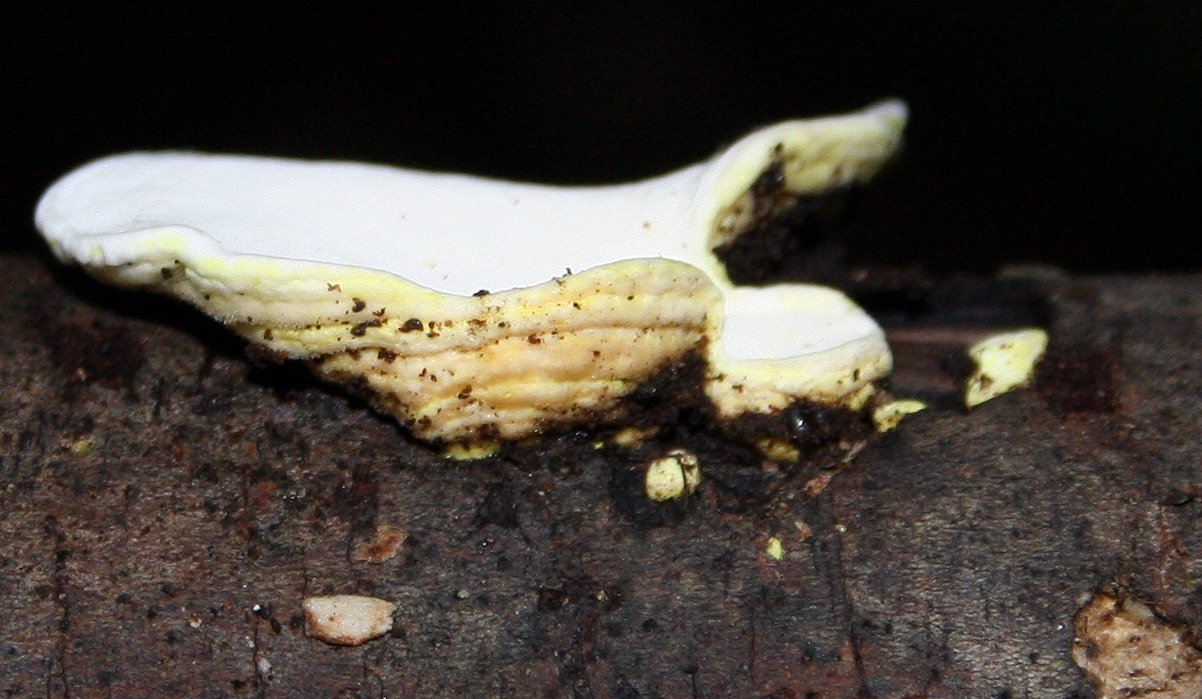

Scientific classification
- Domain: Eukaryota
- Kingdom: Fungi
- Division: Basidiomycota
- Class: Agaricomycetes
- Order: Polyporales
- Family: Steccherinaceae
- Genus: Antrodiella
- Species: A. citrea

Binomial name
- Antrodiella citrea (Berk.) Ryvarden (1984)

Synonyms
- Polyporus citreus Berk. (1873); Polystictus citreus (Berk.) Cooke (1873); Microporus citreus (Berk.) Kuntze (1898); Tyromyces citreus (Berk.) G.Cunn. (1965)

= Antrodiella citrea =

Species of fungus

Antrodiella citrea is a bracket fungus native to Australia and New Zealand.

It was originally described as Polyporus citreus by English botanist Miles Joseph Berkeley in 1872 and has undergone several name changes before being placed in the genus Antrodiella by Leif Ryvarden in 1984.

Up to 2 cm (0.8 in) in diameter, the soft fruiting bodies are found on the underside of dead tree branches, particularly of Eucalyptus trees; they have the texture of chamois. The pored spore-bearing surface is white, while the upper surface is bright yellow. The spore print is white, and the smooth oval spores are around 2.5 by 4.5 μm.
