= Antrodiella lactea =

Scientific classification
- Domain: Eukaryota
- Kingdom: Fungi
- Division: Basidiomycota
- Class: Agaricomycetes
- Order: Polyporales
- Family: Steccherinaceae
- Genus: Antrodiella
- Species: A. lactea

Binomial name
- Antrodiella lactea H.S.Yuan (2018)

Species of fungus

Antrodiella lactea is a species of fungus in the family Steccherinaceae. Found in China, it was described as new to science in 2018 by mycologist Hai-Sheng Yuan. The type collection was made in Maoershan Nature Reserve (Xing'an County, Guangxi), where it was found growing on a fallen angiosperm branch. The specific epithet lactea refers to the cream-coloured fruit body. The fungus has a trimitic hyphal system, and its generative hyphae have clamp connections. Its smooth, thin-walled spores range in shape from oblong to ellipsoidal, and typically measure 3.1–3.6 by 2.1–2.4 μm.
