= Mycorrhaphium citrinum =

Scientific classification
- Kingdom: Fungi
- Division: Basidiomycota
- Class: Agaricomycetes
- Order: Polyporales
- Family: Steccherinaceae
- Genus: Mycorrhaphium
- Species: M. citrinum

Binomial name
- Mycorrhaphium citrinum Ryvarden (1989)

Species of fungus

Mycorrhaphium citrinum is a species of tooth fungus in the family Steccherinaceae that is found in Africa. It was described as a new species in 1989 by Norwegian mycologist Leif Ryvarden. The type collection was made in Chati, a region in the Copperbelt Province in Zambia, where it was found growing in leaf litter.

== Description ==
The fruit body of the fungus has a circular to fan-shaped of semicircular cap measuring 1.5 cm (0.6 in) in diameter. Its colour ranges from "citric yellow" (a feature for which it is named) to pale yellowish brown. The underside of the cap features pale yellow, densely crowded spines measuring 1–3 millimetre long. The spores, which measure 3–3.5 by 2–2.5 μm, have a shaped described as somewhat cylindrical to oblong-ellipsoid. They are smooth, translucent, nonamyloid, and contain a small oil drop. Like other Mycorrhaphium species, the dimitic portion of the hyphal system of M. citrinum is confined to the spines; the remainder of the context is monomitic. The skeletal hyphae are thick-walled, measuring 3–5 μm in diameter.
