= Antella (fungus) =

Scientific classification
- Kingdom: Fungi
- Division: Basidiomycota
- Class: Agaricomycetes
- Order: Polyporales
- Family: Steccherinaceae
- Genus: Antella; Miettinen (2016)

Type species
- Antella niemelaei (Vampola & Vlasák) Miettinen (2016)

Species
- A. americana A. chinensis A. niemelaei

Genus of fungi

Antella is a genus of three species of crust fungi in the family Steccherinaceae.

== Taxonomy ==
The genus was circumscribed by Finnish mycologist Otto Miettinen in 2016 with Antella niemelaei as the type species. All three species were formerly classified in the polyphyletic genus Antrodiella. This is reflected in the name Antella, which is a "construct of letters from the genus name Antrodiella."

== Description ==
Antella species have light-coloured, crust-like fruit bodies with a poroid surface. They have a dimitic hyphal system, with both generative and skeletal hyphae, and clamp connections in the hyphae. The thin-walled spores are ellipsoid, measuring less than 4.5 by 2.5 μm. There are well-differentiated gloeocystidia, a feature that helps differentiate Antella from Antrodiella.

== Species ==
- Antella americana (Ryvarden & Gilbertson) Ryvarden (2016)
- Antella chinensis (H.S.Yuan) Miettinen (2016)
- Antella niemelaei (Vampola & Vlasák) Miettinen (2016)
