= Mycorrhaphium africanum =

Scientific classification
- Kingdom: Fungi
- Division: Basidiomycota
- Class: Agaricomycetes
- Order: Polyporales
- Family: Steccherinaceae
- Genus: Mycorrhaphium
- Species: M. africanum

Binomial name
- Mycorrhaphium africanum Mossebo & Ryvarden (2003)

Species of fungus

Mycorrhaphium africanum is a species of tooth fungus in the family Steccherinaceae. It was described as new to science in 2003 by mycologists Dominique Claude Mossebo and Leif Ryvarden. The type was collected in the Dja Faunal Reserve in Cameroon, where it was found fruiting on fallen dead hardwood branches.

== Description ==
The brownish, funnel-shaped cap measures 4–7.5 cm (1.6–3.0 in) in diameter, and is supported by a smooth stipe that is 3–5 cm (1.2–2.0 in) long and 3–6 mm in diameter. It is initially whitish before becoming pale brown to reddish brown with pink or white spots. The spines on the cap underside are white but become brownish when dry. They are densely packed, and measure up to 3 mm (0.12 in) long.

Mycorrhaphium africanum has a dimitic hyphal system, comprising generative and skeletal hyphae. The skeletal hyphae are confined to the context of the stipe. Basidia are club-shaped, measuring 12–14 by 4–5 μm. The spores are smooth, hyaline, and cylindrical, with dimensions of 4.5–5 by 2 μm.
