= Kotlabaea =

Scientific classification
- Domain: Eukaryota
- Kingdom: Fungi
- Division: Ascomycota
- Class: Pezizomycetes
- Order: Pezizales
- Family: Pyronemataceae
- Genus: Kotlabaea; Svrček (1969)

Type species
- Kotlabaea deformis (P. Karst.) Svrček (1969)

Species
- Kotlabaea deformis Kotlabaea delectans Kotlabaea macrospora Kotlabaea spaniosa Kotlabaea trondii

Genus of fungi

Kotlabaea is a genus of fungi in the family Pyronemataceae.

The genus name of Kotlabaea is in honour of František Kotlaba (1927–2020) was a Czech botanist and mycologist.

The genus was circumscribed by Mirko Svrček in Ceská Mykol. vol.23 on page 85 in 1969.

The GBIF lists the following species;

- Kotlabaea alutacea (Berk. & Broome) K.B.Khare
- Kotlabaea delectans (Starbäck) Svrček
- Kotlabaea macrospora Benkert
- Kotlabaea spaniosa (K.B.Khare) K.B.Khare
