= Xanthoporus =

Scientific classification
- Domain: Eukaryota
- Kingdom: Fungi
- Division: Basidiomycota
- Class: Agaricomycetes
- Order: Polyporales
- Family: Steccherinaceae
- Genus: Xanthoporus; Audet

Genus of fungi

Xanthoporus is a genus of fungi, belonging to the family Steccherinaceae.

The genus was described in 2010 by Audet.

The genus has cosmopolitan distribution.

Species:

- Xanthoporus syringae
