= Caudicicola =

Scientific classification
- Kingdom: Fungi
- Division: Basidiomycota
- Class: Agaricomycetes
- Order: Polyporales
- Family: Steccherinaceae
- Genus: Caudicicola; Miettinen, M.Kulju & Kotir. (2017)

Type species
- Caudicicola gracilis Miettinen, M.Kulju & Kotir. (2017)

Genus of fungi

Caudicicola is a fungal genus in the family Steccherinaceae. The genus was circumscribed by mycologists Heikki Kotiranta, Matti Kulju and Otto Miettinen in 2017 to contain the single crust fungus Caudicicola gracilis. This species is found in Finland, where it grows on the underside of stumps and roots of Norway spruce and Scots pine. The fruit body is fragile and whitish to pale yellow, measuring up to 2.5 mm thick. Its hyphal system is monomitic.
