= Cabalodontia =

Scientific classification
- Kingdom: Fungi
- Division: Basidiomycota
- Class: Agaricomycetes
- Order: Polyporales
- Family: Meruliaceae
- Genus: Cabalodontia; Piątek (2004)

Type species
- Cabalodontia queletii (Bourdot & Galzin) M.Piątek (2004)

Species
- C. bresadolae C. cretacea C. livida C. queletii C. subcretacea

Genus of fungi

Cabalodontia is a genus of fungi in the family Steccherinaceae. The genus was circumscribed by Marcen Piątek in 2004 for five species formerly placed in Phlebia. It is named in honour of Polish phycologist Jolanta Cabała. The type species, C. queletii, has an odontoid hymenophore featuring toothlike projections.

== Species ==
- Cabalodontia bresadolae (Parmasto) Piątek (2004)
- Cabalodontia cretacea (Romell ex Bourdot & Galzin) Piątek (2004)
- Cabalodontia livida (Fr. ex Burt) Piątek (2004)
- Cabalodontia queletii (Bourdot & Galzin) Piątek (2004)
- Cabalodontia subcretacea (Litsch.) Piątek (2004)
