= Atraporiella =

Scientific classification
- Kingdom: Fungi
- Division: Basidiomycota
- Class: Agaricomycetes
- Order: Polyporales
- Family: Steccherinaceae
- Genus: Atraporiella; Ryvarden (2007)

Type species
- Atraporiella neotropica Ryvarden (2007)

Genus of fungi

Atraporiella is a monotypic fungal genus in the family Steccherinaceae. It contains the crust fungus Atraporiella neotropica, known only from Belize.

== Taxonomy ==
Atraporiella is a monotypic genus, containing the single poroid species Atraporiella neotropica, described as new to science by Norwegian mycologist Leif Ryvarden in 2007. This crust fungus is found in Belize, where it grows on decomposing wood. The type collection was made in the Cayo District in November 2001. Molecular analysis suggests that the genus belongs in the family Steccherinaceae.

== Description ==
The fruit body of Atraporiella neotropica is in the form of a small crust fungus, with length and width dimensions of up to 2 to 3 cm (0.8 to 1.2 in), and a thickness of up to 10 mm (0.4 in). When fresh, the pore surface is white, but it readily stains dark brown to black when bruised. The pores are angular, numbering about five to six per millimetre. Atraporiella has a monomitic hyphal structure (containing only generative hyphae), and these hyphae are highly branched, 3–6 μm, and have clamp connections. The spores are ellipsoid, thin-walled, smooth, hyaline (translucent), and do not react with Melzer's reagent. They measure 3–3.5 by 1.2–1.4 μm.
