= Vlastiboř (Tábor District) =

- Municipality
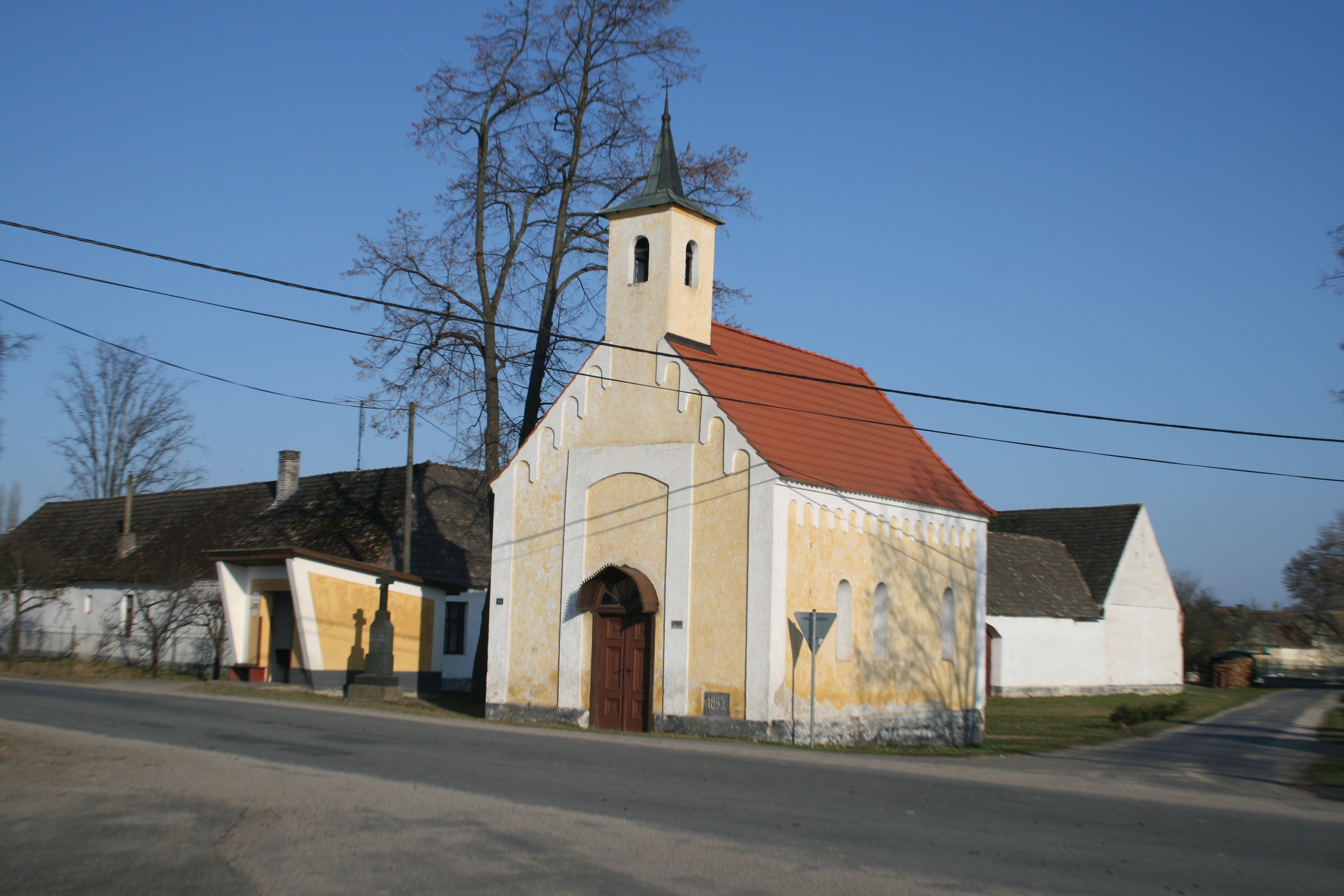
- Chapel in the centre of Vlastiboř

- Location in the Czech Republic
- Coordinates: 49°15′29″N 14°38′12″E
- Country: Czech Republic
- Region: South Bohemian
- District: Tábor
- First mentioned: 1354

Area
  - Total: 17.23 km^{2} (6.65 sq mi)
- Elevation: 432 m (1,417 ft)

Population (2026-01-01)
  - Total: 341
  - Density: 19.8/km^{2} (51.3/sq mi)
- Time zone: UTC+1 (CET)
  - Summer (DST): UTC+2 (CEST)
- Postal code: 392 01
- Website: www.obecvlastibor.cz

Vlastiboř is a municipality and village in Tábor District in the South Bohemian Region of the Czech Republic. It has about 300 inhabitants.

== Administrative division ==
Vlastiboř consists of three municipal parts (in brackets population according to the 2021 census):

- Vlastiboř (217)
- Svinky (60)
- Záluží (32)

== Etymology ==
The name is derived from the personal name Vlastibor, meaning "Vlastibor's (court, property)".

== Geography ==
Vlastiboř is located about 17 kilometres (11 mi) south of Tábor and 32 km (20 mi) north of České Budějovice. It lies mostly in the Třeboň Basin, but it also extends to the Tábor Uplands in the north and east. The stream Bechyňský potok flows through the municipality. There is a set of fishponds fed by the stream, situated in the northern part of the municipal territory.

== History ==
The first written mention of Vlastiboř is from 1354.

== Demographics ==
Historical population

Year	Pop.	±%
1869	619	—
1880	701	+13.2%
1890	677	−3.4%
1900	653	−3.5%
1910	653	+0.0%

Year	Pop.	±%
1921	663	+1.5%
1930	595	−10.3%
1950	486	−18.3%
1961	453	−6.8%
1970	374	−17.4%

Year	Pop.	±%
1980	359	−4.0%
1991	339	−5.6%
2001	309	−8.8%
2011	306	−1.0%
2021	309	+1.0%

Source: Censuses

== Transport ==
There are no railways or major roads passing through the municipality.

== Sights ==
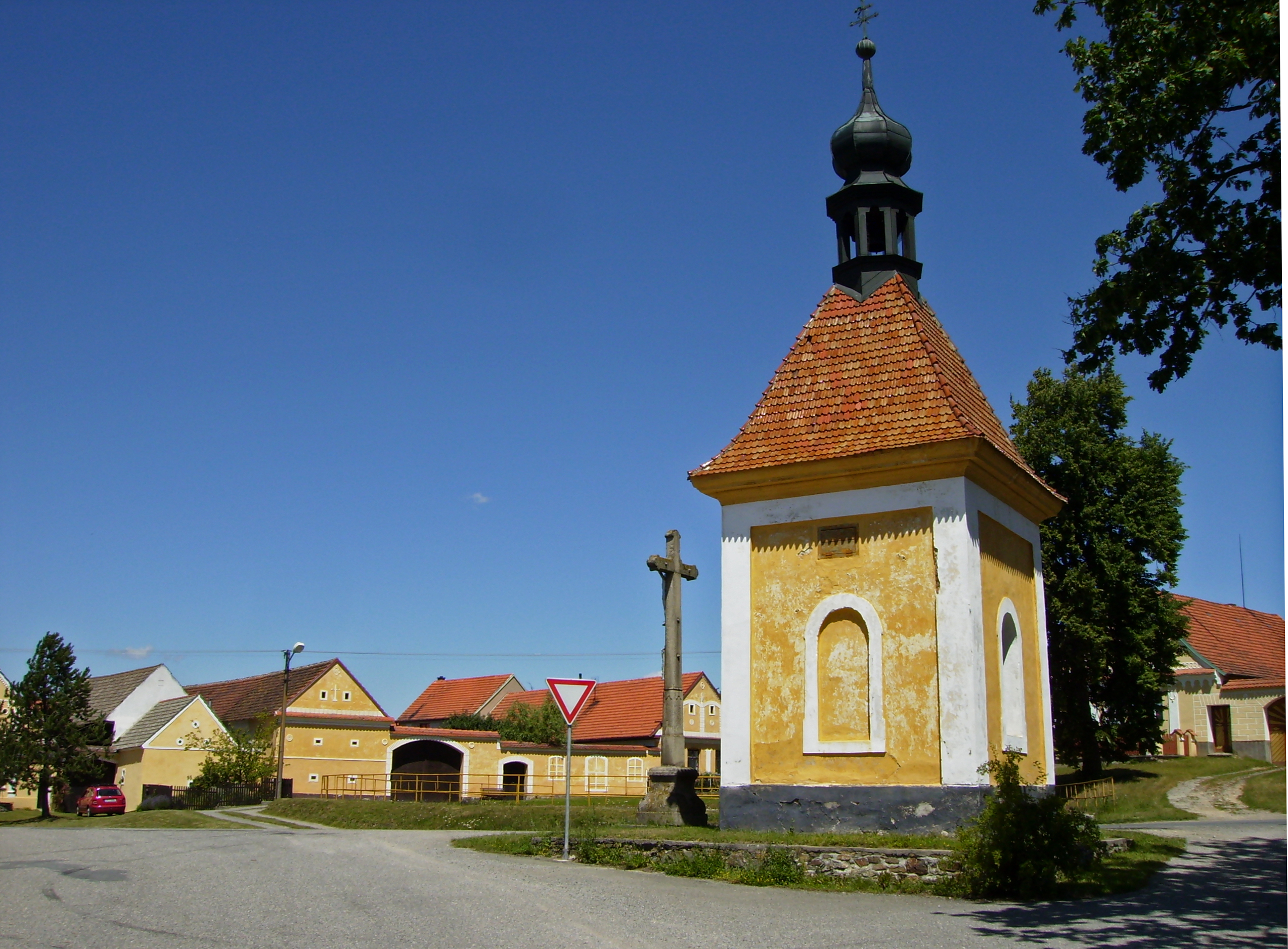
Centre of Záluží with a chapel

All the three villages in the municipality have well preserved buildings in the Folk Baroque style and are protected as two village monument reservations (Vlastiboř and Záluží) and one village monument zone (Svinky).

== Notable people ==
- František Kotlaba (1927–2020), botanist and mycologist
