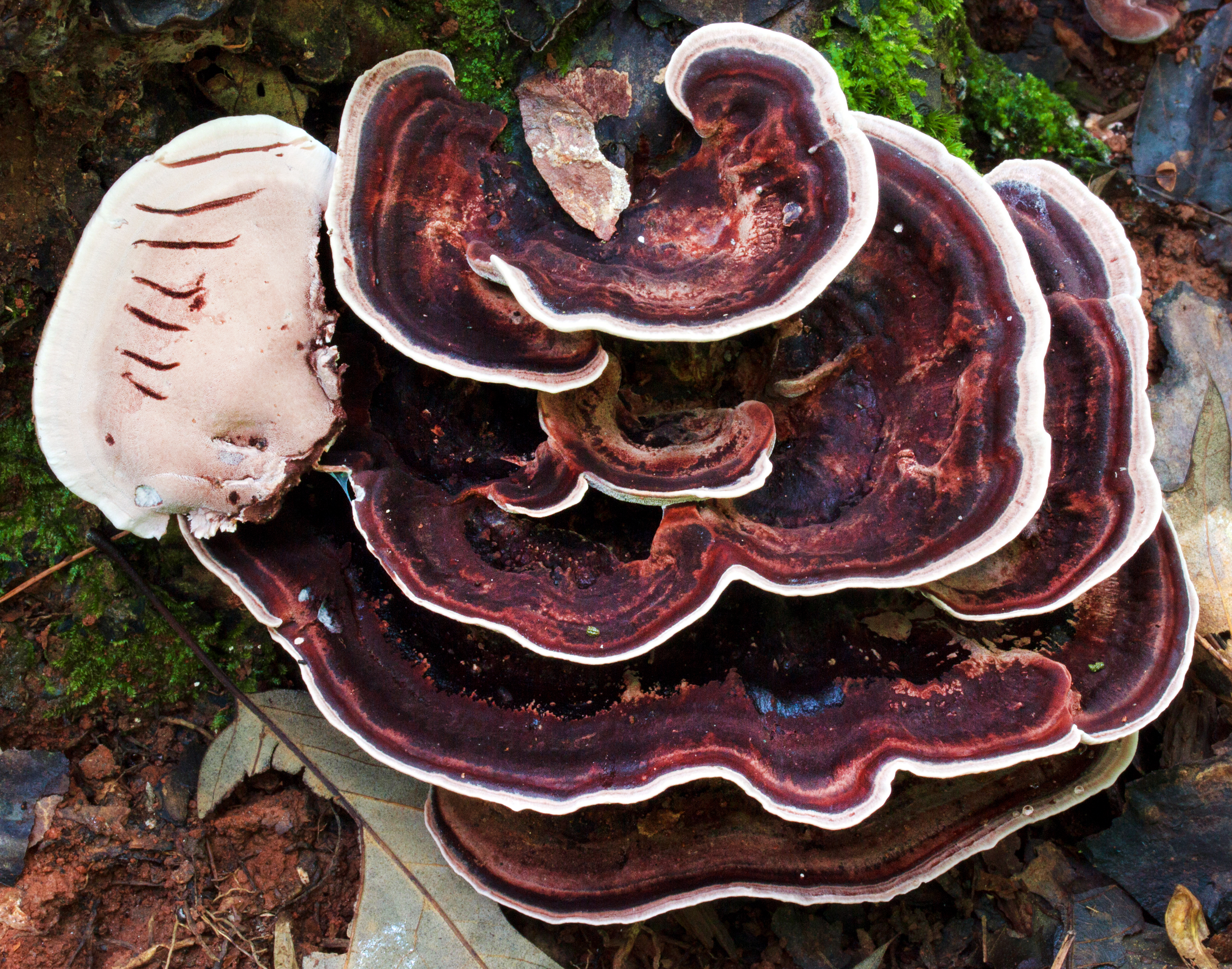

Scientific classification
- Kingdom: Fungi
- Division: Basidiomycota
- Class: Agaricomycetes
- Order: Polyporales
- Family: Steccherinaceae
- Genus: Nigroporus
- Species: N. vinosus

Binomial name
- Nigroporus vinosus (Berk.) Murrill (1905)

Synonyms
- Polyporus vinosus Berk. (1852); Polystictus vinosus (Berk.) Sacc. (1888); Microporus vinosus (Berk.) Kuntze (1898); Coriolus vinosus (Berk.) Pat. (1900); Fomitopsis vinosa (Berk.) Imazeki (1952)

= Nigroporus vinosus =

Species of fungus

Nigroporus vinosus is a species of poroid fungus in the family Steccherinaceae, and the type species of the genus Nigroporus. Its fruit bodies have brownish caps with tinges of purple or red. The cap underside has a pore surface the same colour as the cap, and minute pores.

The species is a wood-decay fungus that causes a white rot. It has a pantropical distribution, being found in Asia, Africa, Oceania, and the Americas.

== Taxonomy ==
The fungus was first described scientifically by Miles Joseph Berkeley as Polyporus vinosus in 1852. The type was collected in Saint-Domingue by Augustus Sallé. Berkeley called the fungus "a very remarkable species, to which I can point out nothing closely allied." William Alphonso Murrill made it the type species of his newly created genus Nigroporus in 1905. He noted that the fungus was "easily recognized by its wine-coloured context."

In the interim between Berkeley and Murrill's nomenclatural changes, the species was shuffled between several genera: Polystictus (Saccardo, 1888); Microporus (Kuntze, 1898); and Coriolus (Patouillard, 1900). In 1952, Rokuya Imazeki proposed a transfer to Fomitopsis.

== Description ==
The fruit bodies of Nigroporus vinosus are annual to perennial. Their caps are leathery to smooth, and sometimes has concentric zones. The colour is reddish-brown to purplish-brown to dark violet. Pores on the cap underside any minute, numbering seven or eight per millimetre; the tubes are up to 3 mm (0.12 in) long. The pore surface has the same colours as the cap. The tough context, coloured dark brown to reddish brown, is pliable when fresh but become brittle when dry. The spore print is white. The odour and taste of the context are indistinct.

The hyphal system of Nigroporus vinosus is variable. According to E. J. H. Corner, "Some collections appear to be almost trimitic; others are dimitic and, yet, others are almost monomitic with elongate intercalary skeletal cells." There are no cystidia in the hymenium. The spores are small, measuring 3–4.5 by 1–1.5 μm. They are smooth and thin-walled, hyaline (translucent), with an allantoid (long with rounded ends) to broadly ellipsoid shape. They are unreactive with Melzer's reagent. The basidia (spore-bearing cells) are thin walled and club shaped, measuring 6–10 by 3–4 μm.

=== Similar species ===
Nigrofomes melanoporus is somewhat similar in appearance to Nigroporus vinosus. Known from tropical regions and from Florida, this fungus has a larger cap that is up to 20 cm (8 in) wide, a hard dark brown to purplish black cap surface, a dark brown to blackish pore surface with pores arranged in a honeycomb, and ellipsoid spores measuring 4–5 by 3–3.5 μm.

== Habitat and distribution ==
Nigroporus vinosus is a white rot fungus that typically grows on the decaying wood of hardwood trees, although it has also been recorded growing on pine. Fruit bodies occur singly, in groups, or in overlapping clusters.

The fungus has been recorded from China, India, the Philippines, Peninsular Malaysia, Micronesia, and Papua New Guinea. In Africa, it is widespread but not common. It is the only species of Nigroporus found in North America. It is also found in Central America, South America, and Cuba.
