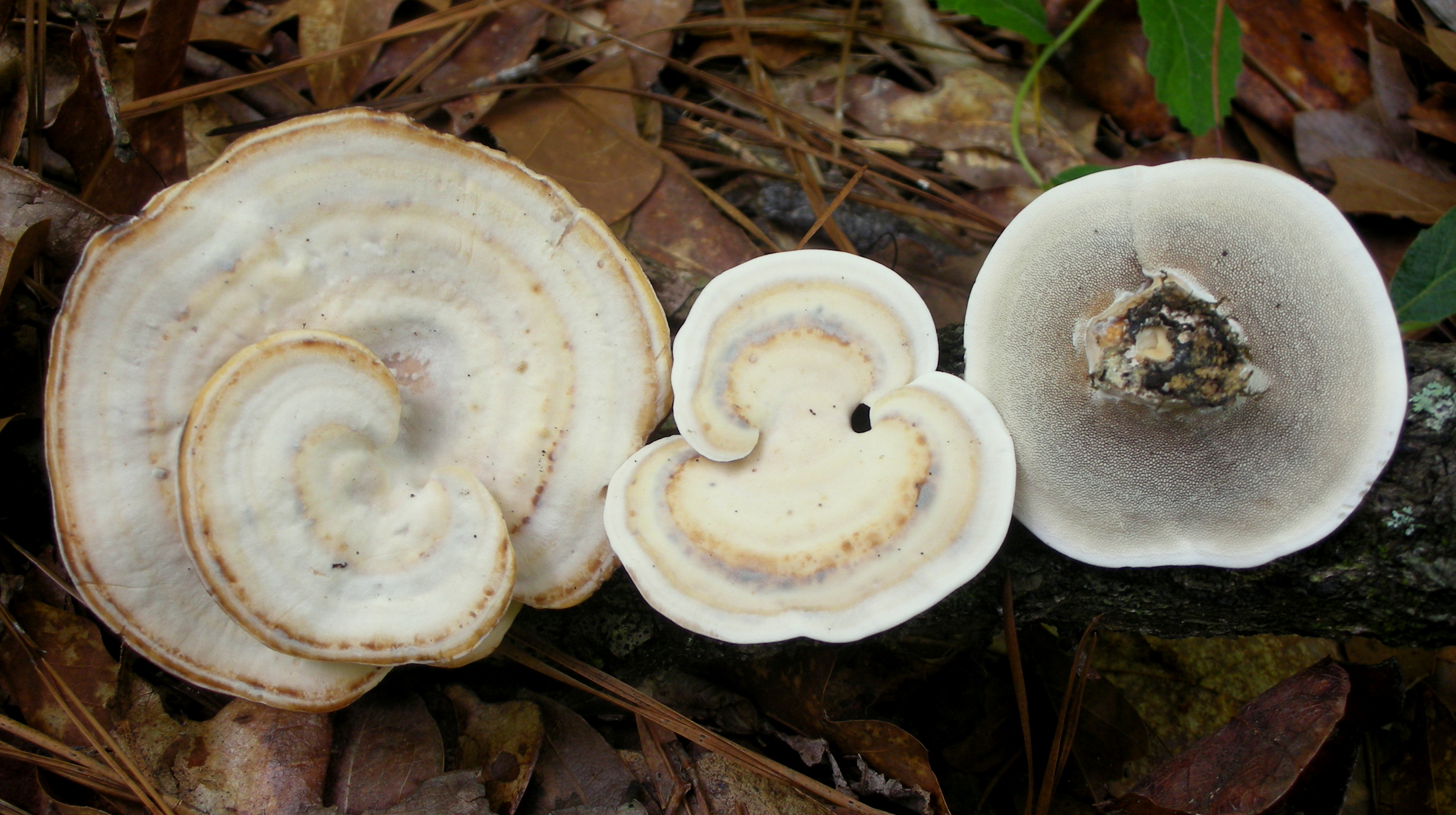
- Mycorrhaphium adustum

Scientific classification
- Kingdom: Fungi
- Division: Basidiomycota
- Class: Agaricomycetes
- Order: Polyporales
- Family: Steccherinaceae
- Genus: Mycorrhaphium; Maas Geest.

Type species
- Mycorrhaphium adustum (Schwein.) Maas Geest.

Species
- Mycorrhaphium adustulum; Mycorrhaphium africanum; Mycorrhaphium citrinum; Mycorrhaphium pusillum; Mycorrhaphium sessile; Mycorrhaphium stereoides; Mycorrhaphium subadustum

= Mycorrhaphium =

Genus of fungi

Mycorrhaphium is a genus of fungi in the family Steccherinaceae. The genus was circumscribed by Dutch mycologist Rudolph Arnold Maas Geesteranus in 1962. The type species is Mycorrhaphium adustum (formerly referred to Hydnum). Fruit bodies of species in the genus have caps, stipes, and a hydnoid (tooth-like) hymenophore. There is a dimitic hyphal system, where the skeletal hyphae are found only in the tissue of the "teeth", and a lack of cystidia. The spores are smooth, hyaline (translucent), and inamyloid.

Walter Jülich created the family Mycorrhaphiaceae to contain the type genus Mycorrhaphium. This family is now placed in synonymy with Steccherinaceae.

== Species ==
- Mycorrhaphium adustulum (Banker) Ryvarden (1989) – Europe, North America
- Mycorrhaphium adustum (Schwein.) Maas Geest. (1962)
- Mycorrhaphium africanum Mossebo & Ryvarden (2003)– Africa (Cameroon)
- Mycorrhaphium citrinum Ryvarden (1989) – Africa (Zambia)
- Mycorrhaphium pusillum (Brot.) Maas Geest. 1962) – Europe
- Mycorrhaphium sessile H.S.Yuan & Y.C.Dai (2009) – China
- Mycorrhaphium stereoides (Cooke) Maas Geest. (1971) – Europe
- Mycorrhaphium subadustum T. Cao & H.S. Yuan (2021) – Asia
