= Butyrea =

Scientific classification
- Kingdom: Fungi
- Division: Basidiomycota
- Class: Agaricomycetes
- Order: Polyporales
- Family: Steccherinaceae
- Genus: Butyrea; Miettinen (2016)

Species
- B. japonica; B. luteoalba

Genus of fungi

Butyrea is a genus of two species of crust fungi in the family Steccherinaceae.

== Taxonomy ==
The genus was circumscribed by Finnish mycologist Otto Miettinen in 2016 with Butyrea luteoalba as the type species. This fungus was originally described as Physisporus luteoalbus by Petter Karsten in 1887. The generic name, derived from the Latin word butyrum ("butter"), refers to the oil-containing cells (gloeocystidia) that are characteristic of the genus.

== Description ==
Butyrea species are poroid with annual, yellowish, crust-like basidiocarps and minute pores numbering 4–8 per millimetre. The hyphal system is dimitic, containing both generative hyphae (with clamps) and skeletal hyphae. The skeletal hyphae are moderately cyanophilous (with cell walls that absorb cotton blue stain), narrow and sinuous, measuring mostly less than 2.5 μm wide with a distinct lumen that is 1/3–1/2 of the width. Two types of cystidia are present: there are thin-walled gloeocystidia in the hymenium and tube bottoms in particular, while thick-walled, club-shaped encrusted cystidia are found in the trama (encrusted part 25–50 by 10–18 μm). The spores of Butyrea fungi are straight and cylindrical with thin walls, and have dimensions of 4–5 by 1.7–2.3 μm.

== Species ==
- Butyrea japonica (Núñez & Ryvarden) Miettinen & Ryvarden (2016)
- Butyrea luteoalba (P.Karst.) Miettinen (2016)
