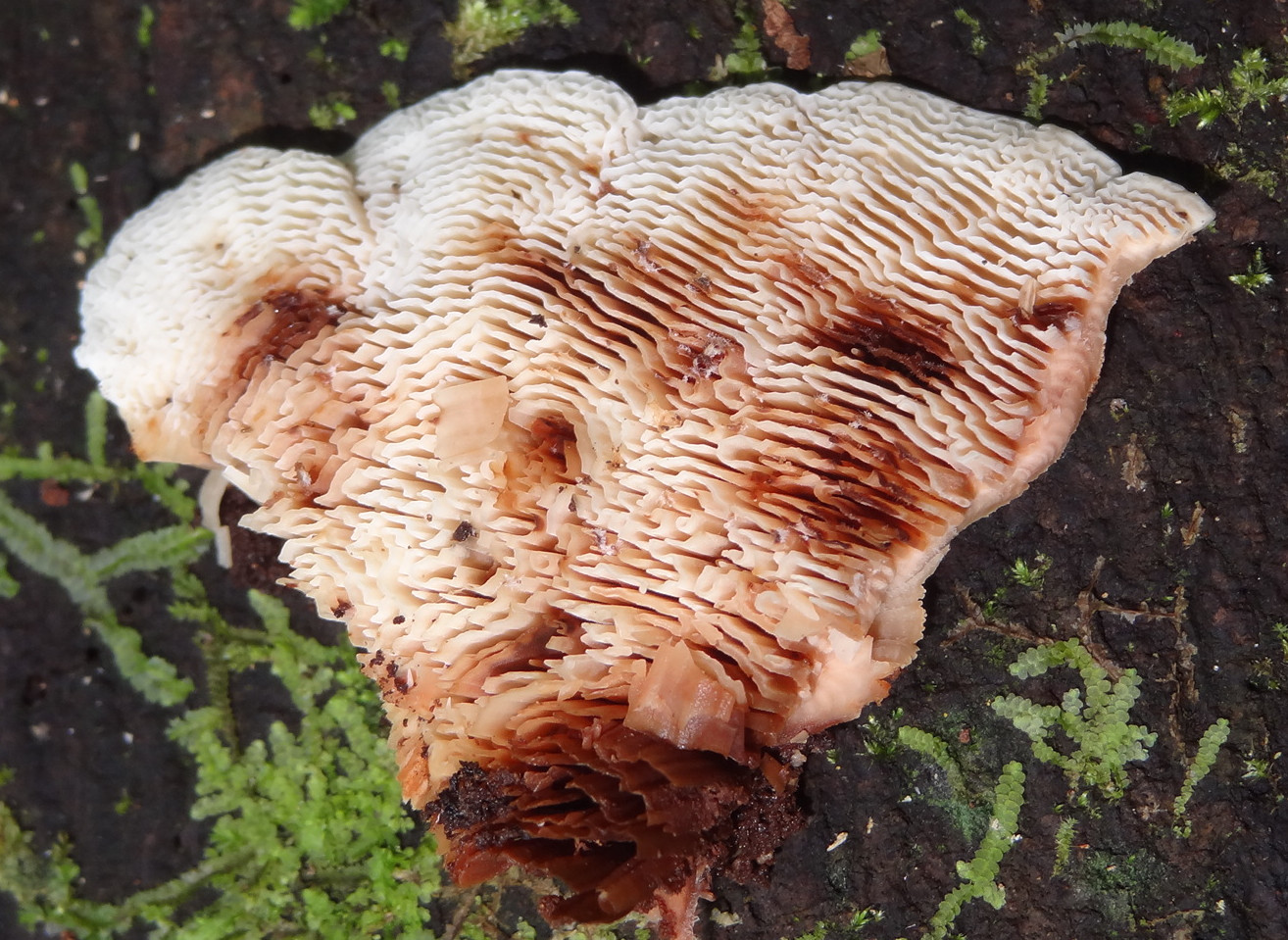
- Lamelloporus americanus

Conservation status
- Endangered (IUCN 3.1)

Scientific classification
- Kingdom: Fungi
- Division: Basidiomycota
- Class: Agaricomycetes
- Order: Polyporales
- Family: Steccherinaceae
- Genus: Lamelloporus; Ryvarden
- Species: L. americanus

Binomial name
- Lamelloporus americanus Ryvarden

= Lamelloporus =

Genus of fungi

Lamelloporus is a fungal genus in the family Steccherinaceae (formerly classified in the Meruliaceae). It is a monotypic genus, containing the single species Lamelloporus americanus. The genus and species were described by Norwegian mycologist Leif Ryvarden in 1987. This fungus is known from tropical America, including Mexico and Venezuela.
