= Cabalodontia cretacea =

Scientific classification
- Domain: Eukaryota
- Kingdom: Fungi
- Division: Basidiomycota
- Class: Agaricomycetes
- Order: Polyporales
- Family: Meruliaceae
- Genus: Cabalodontia
- Species: C. cretacea

Binomial name
- Cabalodontia cretacea (Romell ex Bourdot & Galzin) Piatek

Species of fungus

Cabalodontia cretacea is a species of fungus belonging to the family Meruliaceae.

It is native to Europe and Northern America.
