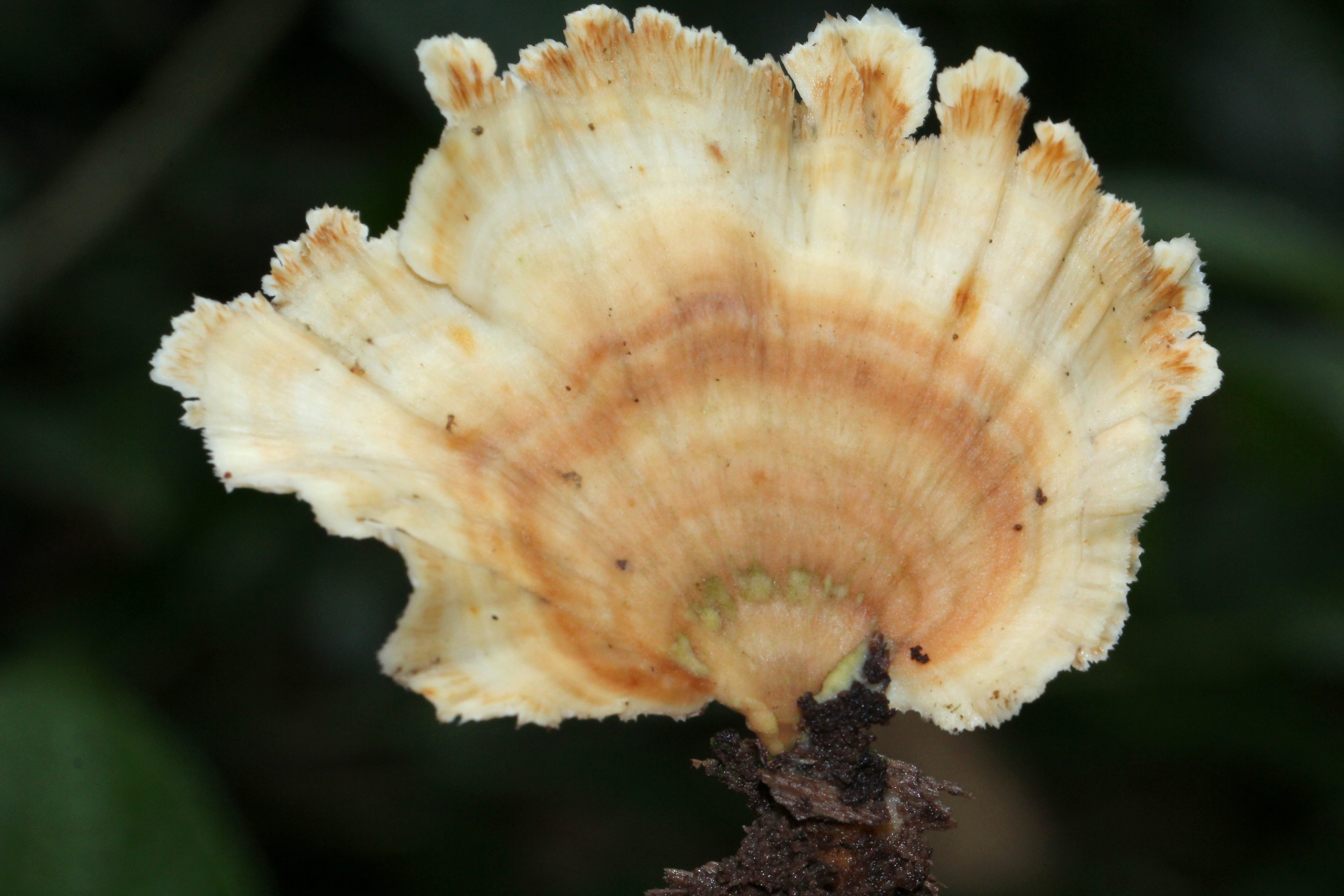
- Flabellophora sp.

Scientific classification
- Kingdom: Fungi
- Division: Basidiomycota
- Class: Agaricomycetes
- Order: Polyporales
- Family: Steccherinaceae
- Genus: Flabellophora; G.Cunn. (1965)

Type species
- Flabellophora superposita (Berk.) G.Cunn. (1965)

= Flabellophora =

Genus of fungi

Flabellophora is a genus of poroid fungi in the family Steccherinaceae. The genus was circumscribed by New Zealand-based mycologist Gordon Herriot Cunningham 1965. Most species in the genus were described by E. J. H. Corner in 1987.

== Species ==
As of June 2017, Index Fungorum accepts 20 species of Flabellophora:

- Flabellophora aurantiaca Corner (1987) – Solomon Islands, Malaysia
- Flabellophora brevipes Corner (1987) Brunei
- Flabellophora deceptiva Corner (1987) – Malaya
- Flabellophora fasciculata Ryvarden & Iturr. (2004) – Venezuela
- Flabellophora flaviporus Corner (1987) – Malaya
- Flabellophora inconspicua Corner (1987) – Malaysia
- Flabellophora intertexta Corner (1987) – New Britain
- Flabellophora kinabaluensis Corner (1987) – Malaysia
- Flabellophora latiporus Corner (1987) – Malaya
- Flabellophora licmophora (Massee) Corner (1987) – Malay Peninsula; Papua New Guinea; Brazil
- Flabellophora nana Corner (1987) – Malaya
- Flabellophora obtorta Corner (1987) – Malaya
- Flabellophora ochracea Corner (1987) – Singapore; Brazil
- Flabellophora parva Corner (1987) – Peru
- Flabellophora squamosa Corner (1987) – Malaya
- Flabellophora subsimplex Corner (1987) – Malaya
- Flabellophora superposita (Berk.) G.Cunn. (1965) – New Zealand
- Flabellophora variabilis Corner (1987) – Brazil
- Flabellophora velutinosa Corner (1987) – Malaysia
