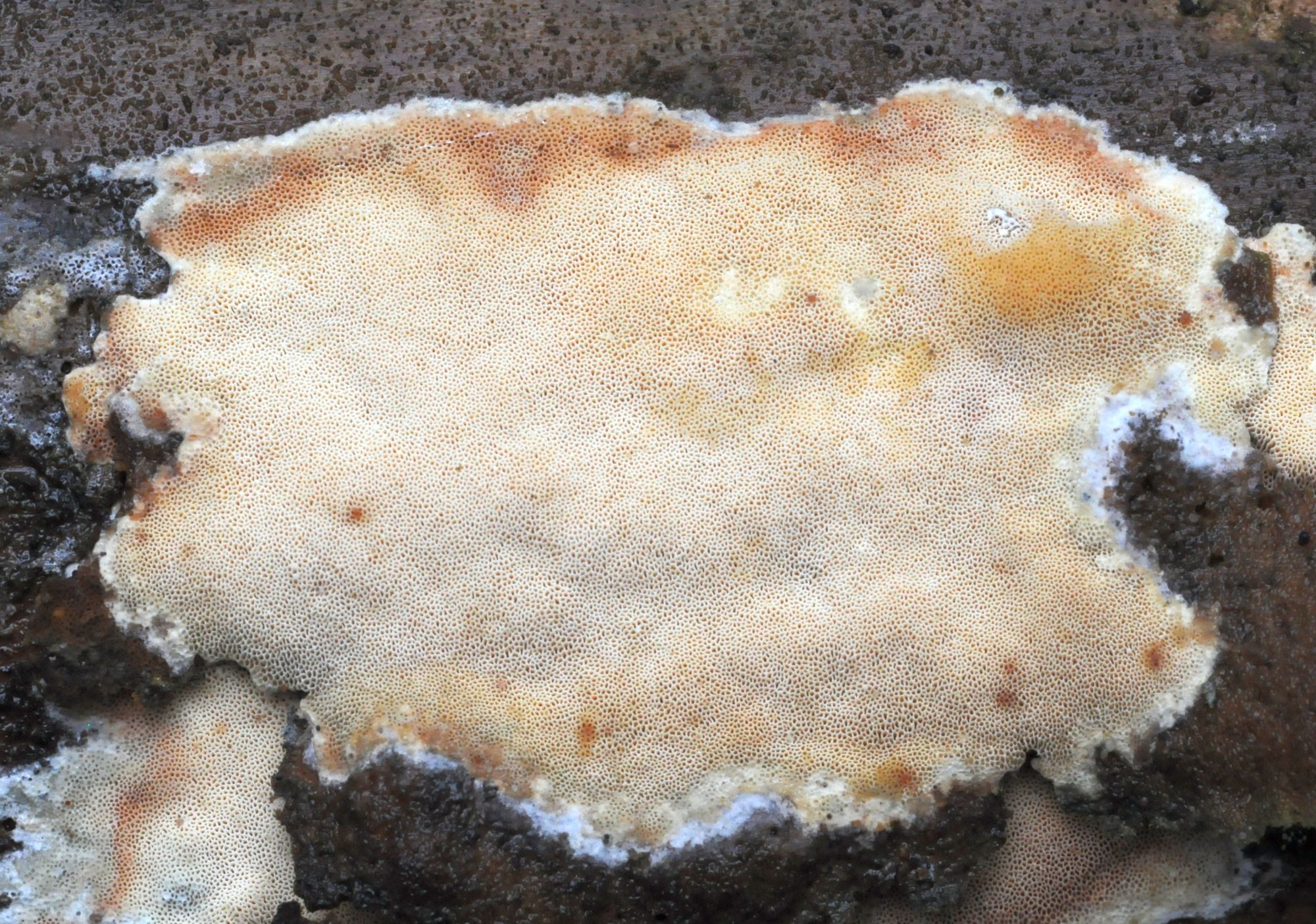
- Butyrea luteoalba

Scientific classification
- Kingdom: Fungi
- Division: Basidiomycota
- Class: Agaricomycetes
- Order: Polyporales
- Family: Steccherinaceae
- Genus: Butyrea
- Species: B. luteoalba

Binomial name
- Butyrea luteoalba (P. Karsten) Miettinen, 2016

= Butyrea luteoalba =

Species of fungus

Butyrea luteoalba is a species of fungus belonging to the family Steccherinaceae.

It has cosmopolitan distribution.

Synonym:

- Junghuhnia luteoalba (P. Karst.) Ryvarden, 1972
