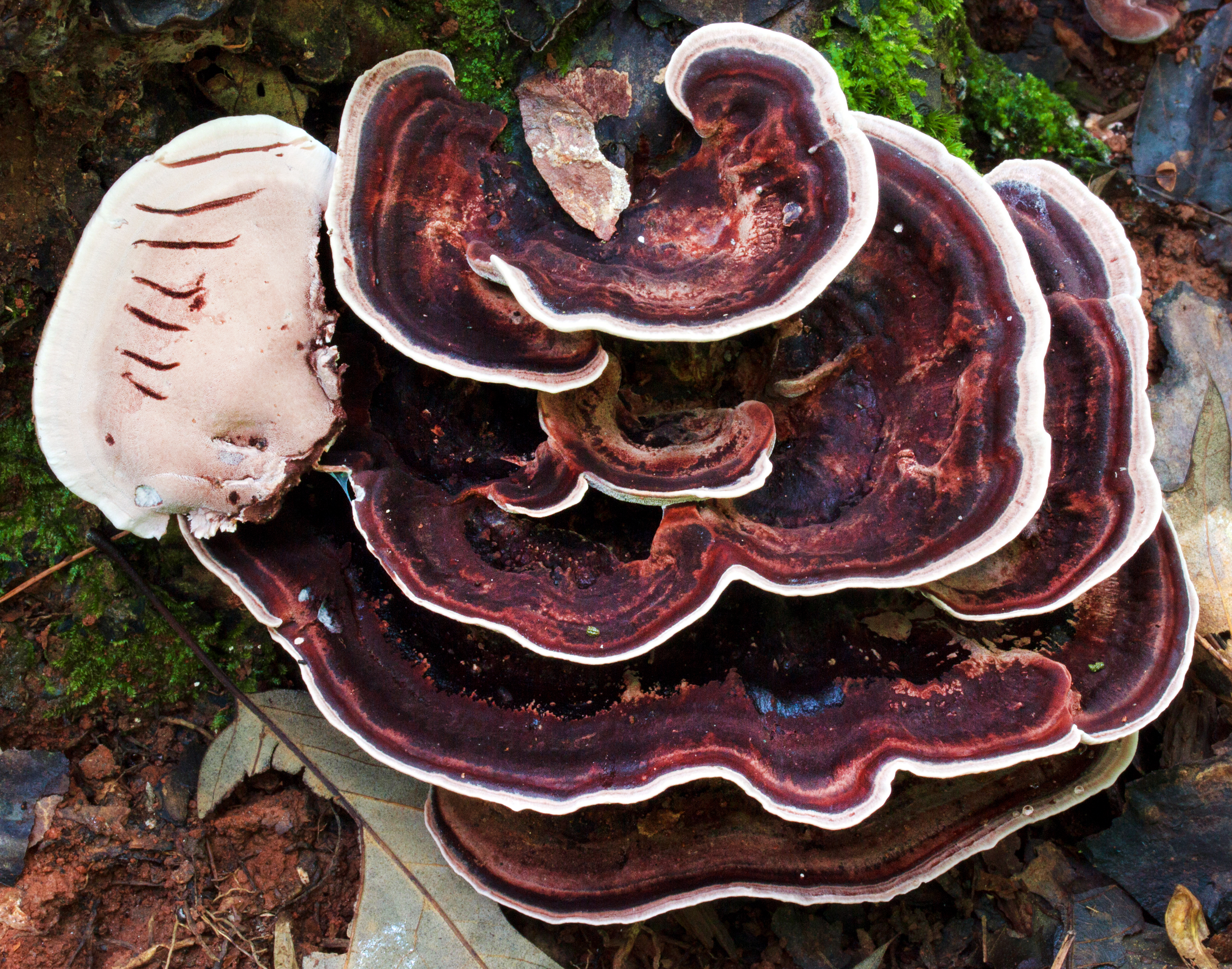
- Nigroporus vinosus

Scientific classification
- Kingdom: Fungi
- Division: Basidiomycota
- Class: Agaricomycetes
- Order: Polyporales
- Family: Steccherinaceae
- Genus: Nigroporus; Murrill

Type species
- Nigroporus vinosus (Berk.) Murrill

Species
- Nigroporus durus Nigroporus macroporus Nigroporus stipitatus Nigroporus ussuriensis Nigroporus vinosus

= Nigroporus =

Genus of fungi

Nigroporus is a genus of poroid fungi in the family Steccherinaceae. The genus was circumscribed by American mycologist William Alphonso Murrill in 1905. Nigroporus has a pantropical distribution. The genus name combines the Latin word niger ("black") with the Ancient Greek word πόρος ("pore").

== Description ==
The fruit bodies of Nigroporus fungi are annual to perennial. Their form ranges from pileate (with a cap) to crust-like. When a cap is present, it is scrupose (rough with very small hard points) to smooth, and sometimes with concentric zones. The colour is greyish-blue, vinaceous-brown to pink or violet. The pore surface has the same colours as the cap; pores are usually small and round to angular. The context is vinaceous brown to pink and purplish.

The hyphal system is dimitic, meaning it contains both generative and skeletal hyphae. The generative hyphae have clamp connections; the skeletal hyphae are brownish, and thick-walled to solid. There are no cystidia in the hymenium. The spores are mostly small, with their longest dimension typically less than 5 μm. They are smooth and thin-walled, hyaline (translucent), with an allantoid (long with rounded ends) to broadly ellipsoid shape.

== Species ==
- Nigroporus durus (Jungh.) Murrill (1907)
- Nigroporus macroporus Ryvarden & Iturr. (2004)
- Nigroporus scalaris (Fr.) Ryvarden (1972)
- Nigroporus stipitatus Douanla-Meli & Ryvarden (2007)
- Nigroporus ussuriensis (Bondartsev & Ljub.) Y.C.Dai & Niemelä (1995)
- Nigroporus vinosus (Berk.) Murrill (1905)
