= Rickiopora =

Scientific classification
- Kingdom: Fungi
- Division: Basidiomycota
- Class: Agaricomycetes
- Order: Polyporales
- Family: incertae sedis
- Genus: Rickiopora (Rick) Westphalen, Tomšovský & Rajchenb. (2016)

Type species
- Rickiopora latemarginata (Rick) Westphalen, Tomšovský & Rajchenb. (2016)

Synonyms
- Daedalea latemarginata Rick (1960); Ceriporiopsis latemarginata (Rick) Rajchenb. (1987); Antrodiella angulatopora Ryvarden (1987)

Genus of fungi

Rickiopora is a fungal genus of unknown familial placement in the order Polyporales. The genus is monotypic, containing the single neotropical species Rickiopora latemarginata.

== Taxonomy ==
Rickiopora latemarginata was first characterized by Johannes Rick, who called it Daedalea latemarginata. Mario Rajchenberg proposed a transfer to genus Ceriporiopsis in 1987. In collaboration with Mauro Westphalen and Michal Tomšovský, Rajchenberg circumscribed the new genus Rickiopora in 2016 to contain the fungus. The generic name honours Johannes Rick.

The fungus Antrodiella angulatopora, described from Venezuela by Leif Ryvarden in 1987, was later determined by Rajchenberg to be synonymous with Ceriporiopsis latemarginata.

Rickiopora groups phylogenetically in the "residual polyploid clade", but is distinct from all other polypore genera found in this clade and so has not been assigned to any specific family of the Polyporales.

== Description ==
A combination of characteristics found in Rickiopora distinguish it from other polypore genera. It has fruit bodies that become corky to tough and brittle when dried. The hyphal system is monomitic, consisting of clamped and metachromatic generative hyphae (staining a reddish purple when mounted in cresyl blue), and thick-walled hyphae with sparse clamps. The spores are ellipsoid to ovoid, measuring 11–16 by 4–7 μm. Rickiopora features both a bipolar mating system, and astatocenocytic nuclear behaviour.
