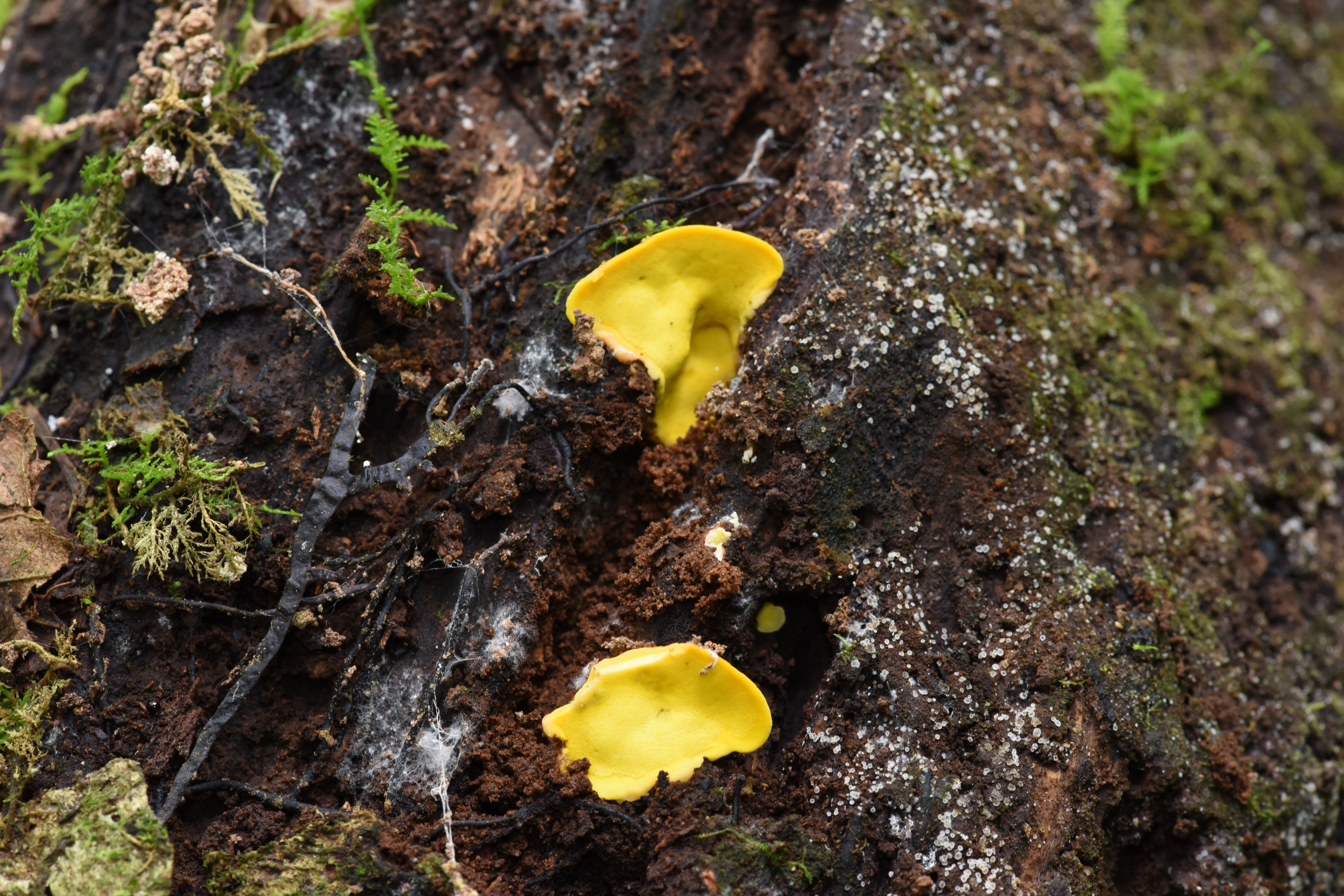
- Flaviporus brownii

Scientific classification
- Kingdom: Fungi
- Division: Basidiomycota
- Class: Agaricomycetes
- Order: Polyporales
- Family: Steccherinaceae
- Genus: Flaviporus; Murrill (1905)

Type species
- Flaviporus rufoflavus (Berk. & M.A.Curtis) Murrill (1905)

Synonyms
- Baeostratoporus Bondartsev & Singer (1941); Baeostratoporus Bondartsev & Singer (1944)

= Flaviporus =

Genus of fungi

Flaviporus is a genus of poroid fungi in the family Steccherinaceae.

== Taxonomy ==
Flaviporus was circumscribed by American mycologist William Alphonso Murrill in 1905. He designated the type species as Flaviporus rufoflavus; this taxon is now considered the same as Flaviporus brownii. The generic name combines the Latin word flavus ("light yellow") with the Ancient Greek πόρος (pore).

== Description ==
Murrill described the characteristics of Flaviporus as follows: "Hymenium annual, often reviving, epixylous, sessile, dimidiate, imbricate; surface encrusted, glabrous: context thick, woody, brown; tubes thin-walled, minute, regular: spores smooth, hyaline."

== Species ==
- Flaviporus americanus (Ryvarden & Gilb.) Ginns (1984)
- Flaviporus brownii (Humb.) Donk (1960)
- Flaviporus citrinellus (Niemelä & Ryvarden) Ginns (1984)
- Flaviporus delicatus A.David & Rajchenb. (1992) – Africa
- Flaviporus hunua (G.Cunn.) Ginns (1984)
- Flaviporus hydrophilus (Berk. & M.A.Curtis) Ginns (1980)
- Flaviporus liebmannii (Fr.) Ginns (1980)
- Flaviporus minutisporus (D.A.Reid, K.S.Thind & Chatr.) Ginns (1980) – Uttar Pradesh
- Flaviporus stramineus (Bres.) Ginns (1984)
- Flaviporus subhydrophilus (Speg.) Rajchenb. & J.E.Wright (1987)
- Flaviporus venustus A.David & Rajchenb. (1985) – Martinique
- Flaviporus xanthus A.David & Rajchenb. (1992) – Africa
