= František Kotlaba =

Czech botanist and mycologist (1927–2020)

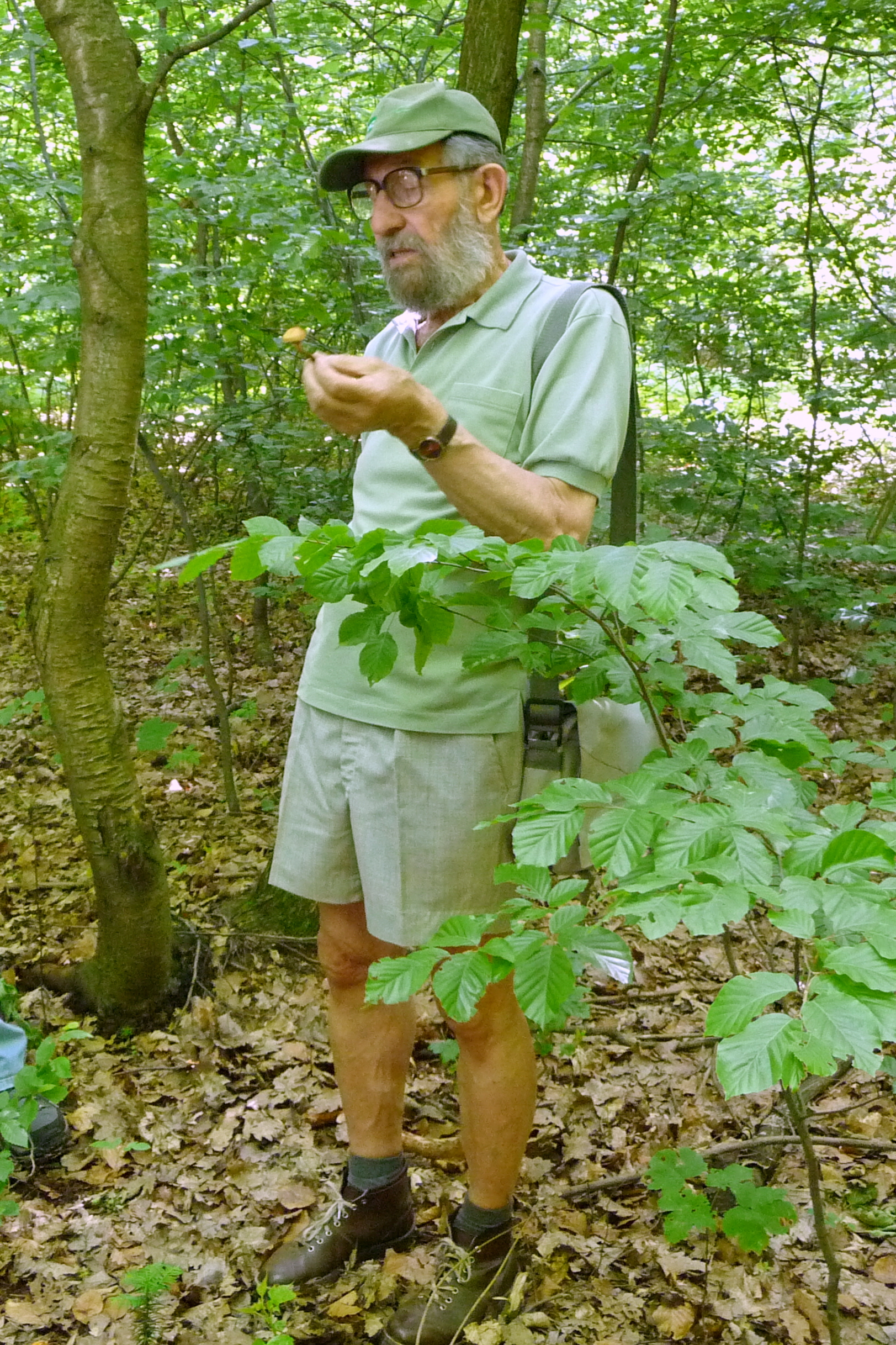
- Born: 20 May 1927; Vlastiboř), Czech Republic
- Died: 11 June 2020 (aged 93); Prague, Czech republic
- Known for: Contributions to taxonomic mycology
- Scientific career
- Fields: Mycology
- Workplaces: Academy of Sciences of the Czech Republic
- Author abbrev. (botany): Kotl.

František Kotlaba (20 May 1927 in Vlastiboř – 11 June 2020 in Prague) was a Czech botanist and mycologist.

== Scientific career ==
After his degree in Natural Sciences and Pedagogy at the Charles University in Prague, Kotlaba received a post at the National Museum in Prague in 1957. From 1962 to 1990 he was a scientific employee of the Academy of Sciences of the Czech Republic at Průhonice. Kotlaba was for a long time in the editorial staff of the journal Mykologické listy and was the author of several books, some of a popular scientific nature.

== Honours ==
Kotlabaea which is a genus of fungi in the family Pyronemataceae was published by Mirko Svrček in 1969, was named in his honour. The mycological journal Česká Mykologie, to which he made numerous contributions, dedicated an edition to him on the occasion of his eightieth birthday in 2007. Also in 2007, a genus of Polypores, Frantisekia was named after him.

== Research ==
Kotlaba's main research areas were taxonomy and geographical distribution and ecology of agarics and boletes. Apart from this he has published several works on mushroom conservation. With Zdenek Pouzar in 1972 he influenced fungal taxonomy by defining the mushroom families Entolomataceae and Pluteaceae for the first time, in Česká Mykologie. These family names are still currently in use.

== Eponymous taxa ==
- Frantisekia Spirin & Zmitr. 2007
- Kotlabaea Svrček 1969
- Geastrum kotlabae V.J.Staněk 1958
- Junghuhnia kotlabae Pouzar 2003
- Pleurotus kotlabae Pilát 1953
- Tulostoma kotlabae Pouzar 1958
