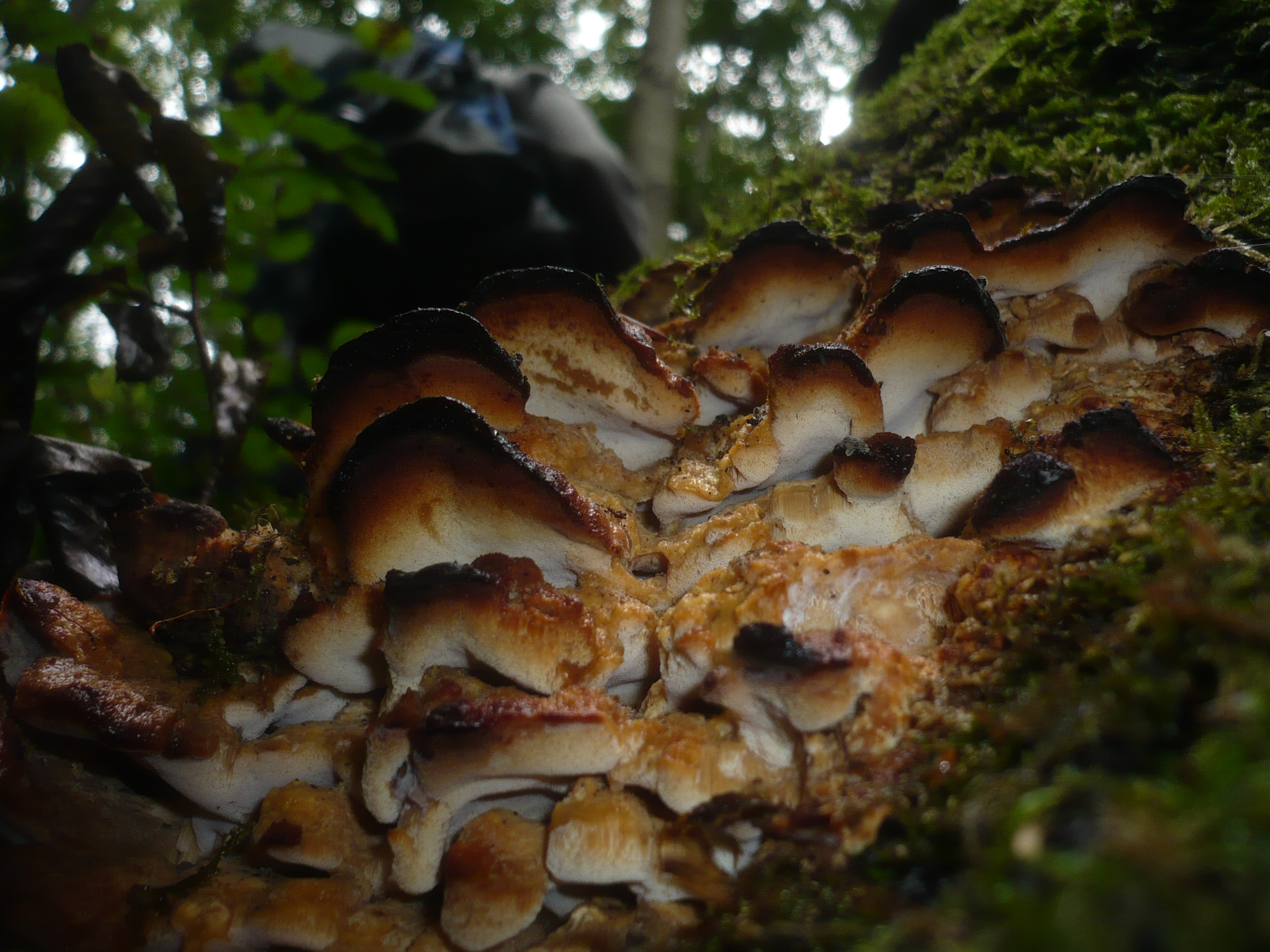
- Frantisekia mentschulensis

Scientific classification
- Kingdom: Fungi
- Division: Basidiomycota
- Class: Agaricomycetes
- Order: Polyporales
- Family: Steccherinaceae
- Genus: Frantisekia; Spirin & Zmitr. (2007)

Type species
- Frantisekia fissiliformis (Pilát) Spirin & Zmitr. (2007)

Species
- F. abieticola F. fissiliformis F. mentschulensis F. ussurii

= Frantisekia =

Genus of fungi

Frantisekia is a genus of wood-decay fungi in the family Steccherinaceae.

== Species ==
- Frantisekia abieticola H.S.Yuan (2013)
- Frantisekia fissiliformis (Pilát) Spirin & Zmitr. (2007)
- Frantisekia mentschulensis (Pilát ex Pilát) Spirin (2007)
- Frantisekia ussurii (Y.C.Dai & Niemelä) Spirin (2007)
