= Melzerodontia =

Scientific classification
- Kingdom: Fungi
- Division: Basidiomycota
- Class: Agaricomycetes
- Order: Corticiales
- Family: Corticiaceae
- Genus: Melzerodontia; Hjortstam & Ryvarden (1980)

Type species
- Melzerodontia aculeata Hjortstam & Ryvarden (1980)

Species
- M. aculeata M. rasilis M. udamentiens

Genus of fungi

Melzerodontia is a genus of toothed crust fungi in the family Corticiaceae. The genus contains three species that are found in Africa.

== Species ==
- Melzerodontia aculeata Hjortstam & Ryvarden (1980)
- Melzerodontia rasilis Hjortstam & Ryvarden (1997)
- Melzerodontia udamentiens P.Roberts (2000)
