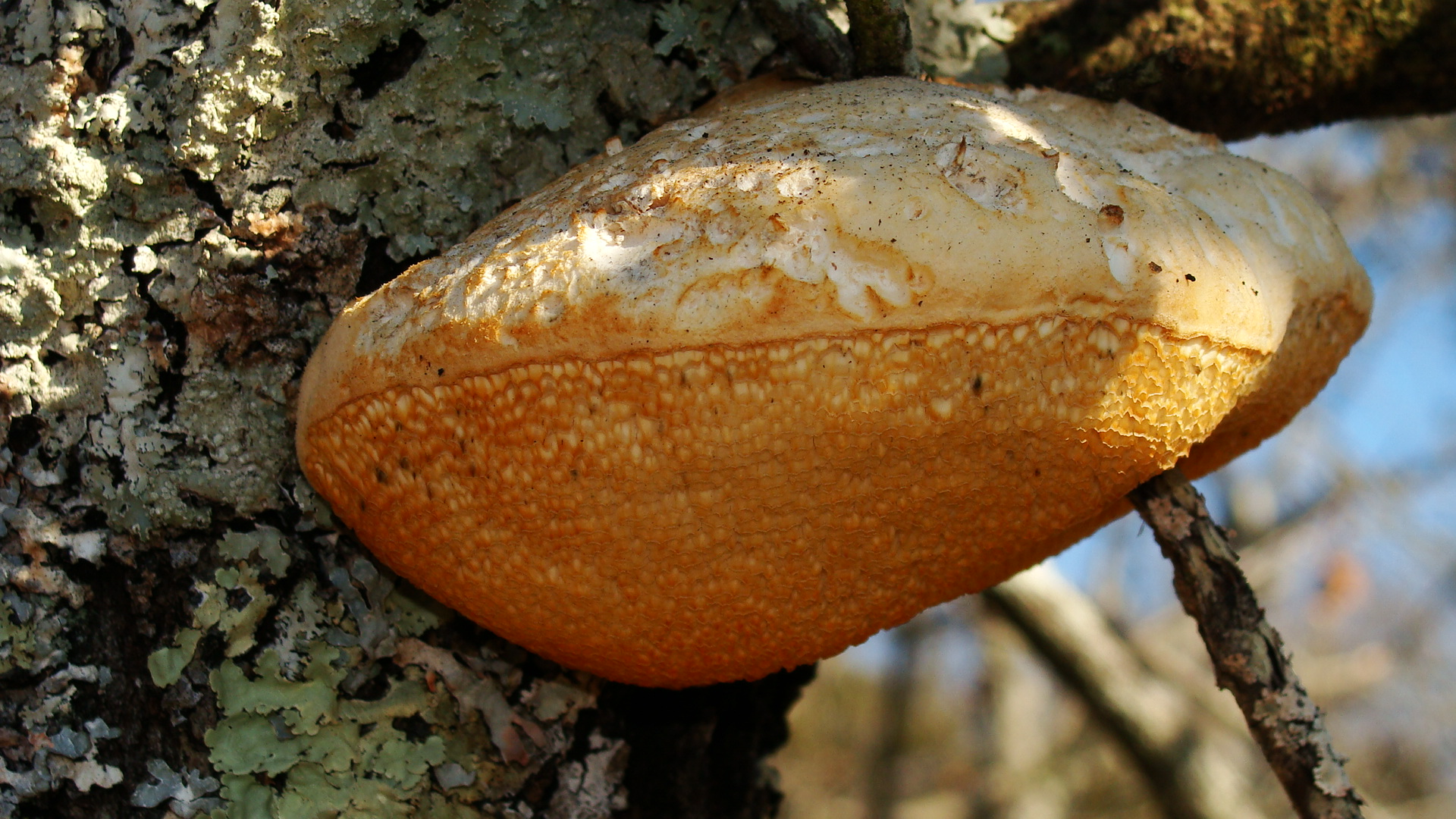
- Spongipellis unicolor

Scientific classification
- Kingdom: Fungi
- Division: Basidiomycota
- Class: Agaricomycetes
- Order: Polyporales
- Family: Polyporaceae
- Genus: Spongipellis; Pat. (1874)

Type species
- Spongipellis spumeus (Sowerby) Pat. (1887)

= Spongipellis =

Genus of fungi

Spongipellis is a genus of fungus in the family Polyporaceae. The genus is widely distributed and contains ten species. The genus was circumscribed by French mycologist Narcisse Théophile Patouillard in 1887. The genus name combines the Latin words spongia ("sponge") and pellis ("skin").

== Species ==
As of June 2017, Index Fungorum accepts ten species of Spongipellis:

- S. africana Ipulet & Ryvarden (2005) – Uganda
- S. caseosus (Pat.) Ryvarden (1983)
- S. chubutensis J.E.Wright & J.R.Deschamps (1972)
- S. delectans (Peck) Murrill (1907)
- S. hypococcineus (Berk.) Pat. (1900)
- S. labyrinthicus (Fr.) Pat. (1900)
- S. litschaueri Lohwag (1931) – Czech Republic
- S. malicola (Lloyd) Ginns (1984)
- S. subcretaceus (Lloyd) Decock, P.K.Buchanan & Ryvarden (2000)
- S. unicolor (Fr.) Murrill (1907)
- S. pachyodon
