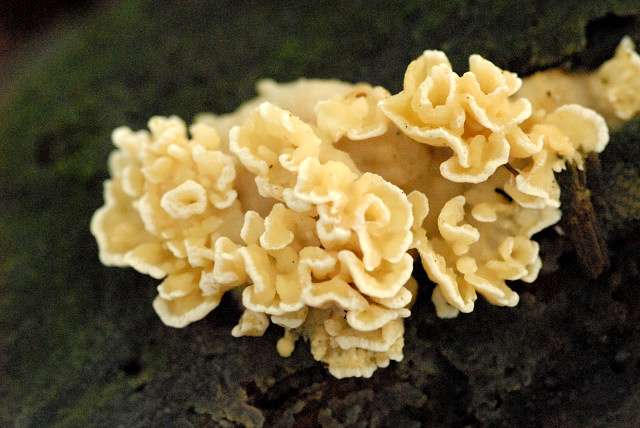
- Antrodiella semisupina

Scientific classification
- Kingdom: Fungi
- Division: Basidiomycota
- Class: Agaricomycetes
- Order: Polyporales
- Family: Steccherinaceae
- Genus: Antrodiella; Ryvarden & I.Johans. (1980)

Type species
- Antrodiella semisupina (Berk. & M.A.Curtis) Ryvarden (1980)

= Antrodiella =

Genus of fungi

Antrodiella is a genus of fungi in the family Steccherinaceae of the order Polyporales.

== Taxonomy ==
Antrodiella was circumscribed by mycologists Leif Ryvarden and I. Johansen in 1980. Of the seven original species it contained, only the type, Antrodiella semisupina, remains in the genus; most of the original species have since been transferred to Flaviporus.

Antrodiella was traditionally placed in the family Phanerochaetaceae until molecular studies were used to determine a more appropriate classification in the Steccherinaceae. The genus is a wastebasket taxon, containing "species that share common macroscopic and microscopic characteristics, but are not necessarily related".

== Description ==
The fruitbodies of Antrodiella fungi are either crust-like to effused-reflexed (stretched out on the substrate but with edges curled up to form cap-like structures) in form. They have a waxy and soft fresh texture that becomes dense and hard, and often semitranslucent when dry. If it is present, the cap is narrow and light-coloured, smooth to scrupose (rough with very small hard points). The pore surface is light ochraceous to straw-coloured when dry, with small pores, and the tubes the same colour as the pore surface. The context is white to pale straw-coloured.

Antrodiella has a dimitic hyphal system, containing both generative and skeletal hyphae. The generative hyphae have clamps; the skeletal hyphae are typically narrow, hyaline, and thick-walled to solid. Although they are usually unbranched, in rare cases they have a few scattered branches. Cystidia can be absent or present from the hymenium. Antrodiella spores are small, rarely measuring above 5 μm in their longest dimension, and have a shape that is almost spherical, ellipsoid, or allantoid (sausage-shaped). They are thin-walled, hyaline, and non-amyloid.

== Species ==
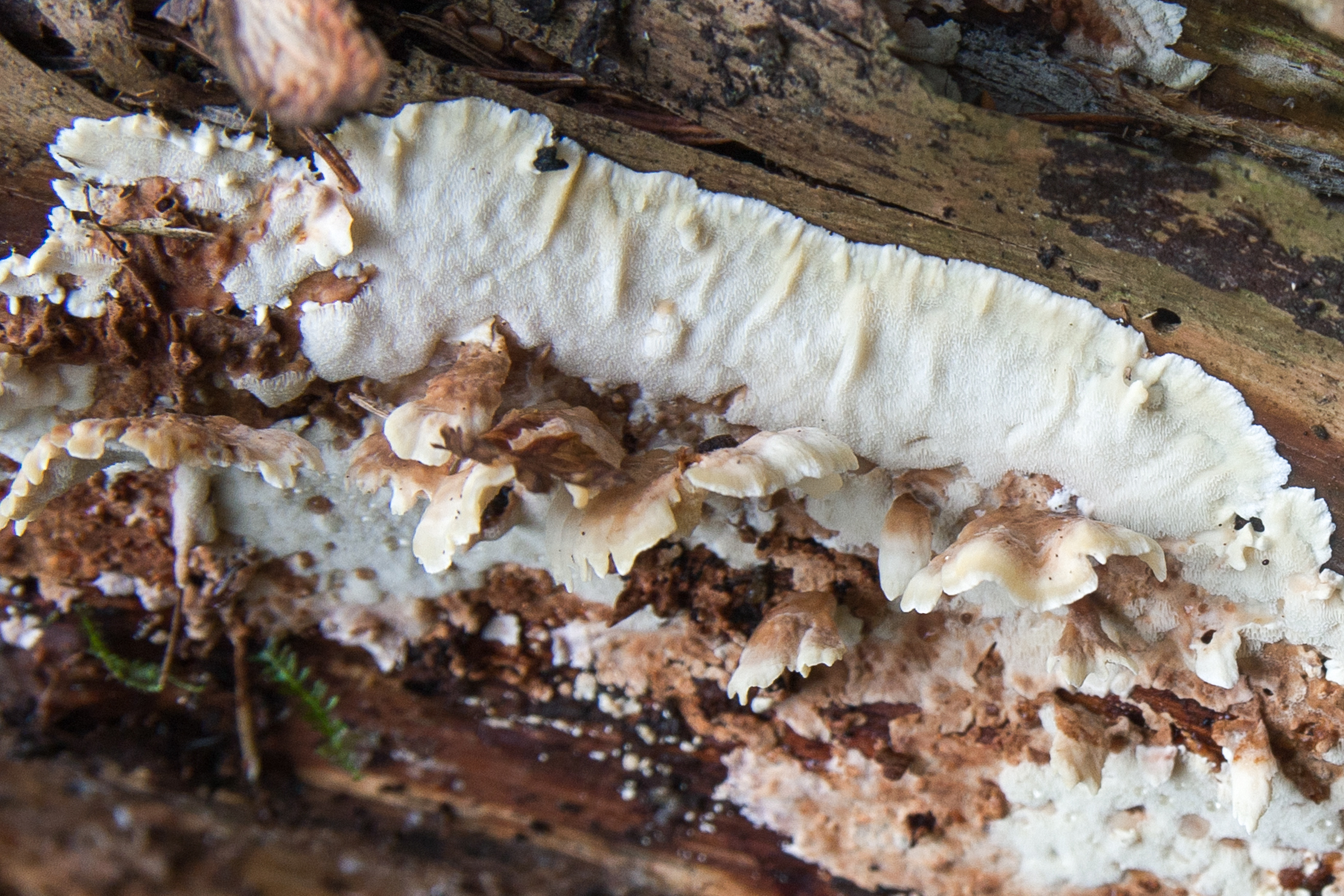
Antrodiella pallasii

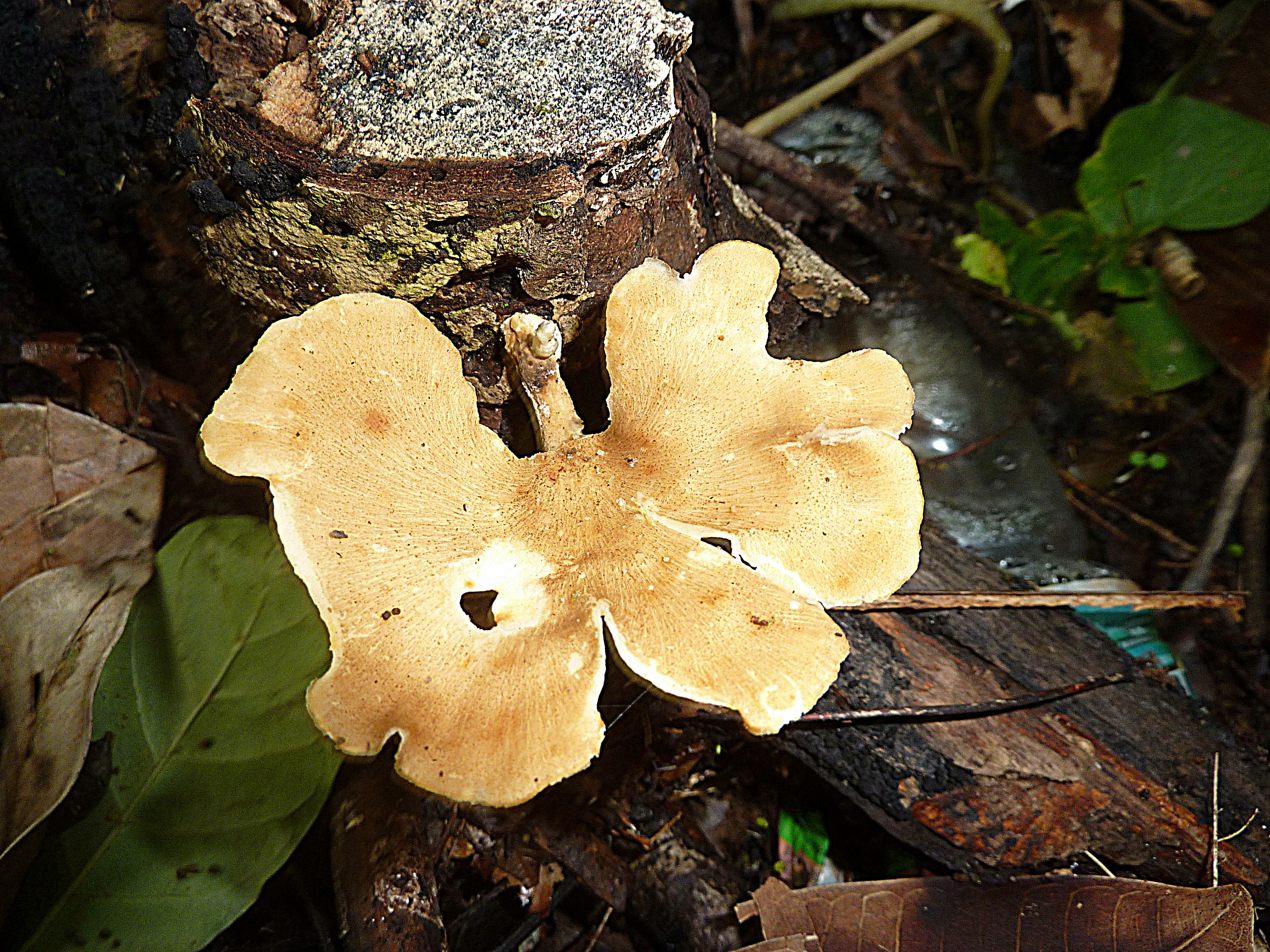
Antrodiella versicutis

A 2008 estimate placed about 50 species in Antrodiella.

- Antrodiella angulatopora Ryvarden (1987)
- Antrodiella brasiliensis Ryvarden & de Meijer (2002) – Brazil
- Antrodiella brunneimontana (Corner) T.Hatt. (2002)
- Antrodiella canadensis (Overh.) Niemelä (2005)
- Antrodiella chinensis H.S.Yuan (2013) – China
- Antrodiella cinnamomea Iturr. & Ryvarden (2010)
- Antrodiella citrea (Berk.) Ryvarden (1984)
- Antrodiella citripileata H.S.Yuan (2012) – China
- Antrodiella dentipora Ryvarden & Iturr. (2003) – Venezuela
- Antrodiella depauperata (Corner) T.Hatt. (2005)
- Antrodiella diffluens (Corner) T.Hatt. (2002)
- Antrodiella ellipsospora (Pilát) Niemelä & Miettinen (2006)
- Antrodiella faginea Vampola & Pouzar (1996) – Europe
- Antrodiella fissiliformis (Pilát) Gilb. & Ryvarden (1987)
- Antrodiella flava (Corner) T.Hatt. (2001)
- Antrodiella flavitubus (Corner) T.Hatt. (2002)
- Antrodiella foliaceodentata (Nikol.) Gilb. & Ryvarden (1993)
- Antrodiella formosana T.T.Chang & W.N.Chou (1998) – Taiwan
- Antrodiella fragrans (A.David & Tortič) A.David & Tortič (1986)
- Antrodiella genistae (Bourdot & Galzin) A.David (1990)
- Antrodiella globospora Núñez & Ryvarden (1999) – Japan
- Antrodiella ichnusana Bernicchia, Renvall & Arras (2005) – Europe
- Antrodiella incrustans (Cooke) Ryvarden (1984)
- Antrodiella indica G.Kaur, Avneet P.Singh & Dhingra (2015) – India
- Antrodiella induratus (Berk.) Ryvarden (1984)
- Antrodiella lactea H.S.Yuan (2013) – China
- Antrodiella leucoxantha (Bres.) Miettinen & Niemelä (2006)
- Antrodiella luteocontexta Ryvarden & de Meijer (2002) – Brazil
- Antrodiella mentschulensis (Pilát ex Pilát) Ryvarden (2014)
- Antrodiella micra Y.C.Dai (2004) – China
- Antrodiella mollis Gibertoni & Ryvarden (2004)
- Antrodiella multipileata Log.-Leite & J.E.Wright (1991) – South America
- Antrodiella murrillii (Lloyd) Ryvarden (1990)
- Antrodiella nanospora H.S.Yuan (2013) – China
- Antrodiella negligenda (Corner) T.Hatt. (2003)
- Antrodiella onychoides (Egeland) Niemelä (1982)
- Antrodiella pachycheiles (Ellis & Everh.) Miettinen & Niemelä (2006)
- Antrodiella pallasii Renvall, Johann. & Stenlid (2000)
- Antrodiella pallescens (Pilát) Niemelä & Miettinen (2006)
- Antrodiella parasitica Vampola (1991) – Europe
- Antrodiella pendulina H.S.Yuan (2012)
- Antrodiella perennis B.K.Cui & Y.C.Dai (2009) – China
- Antrodiella pirumspora Rivoire & Gannaz (2012)
- Antrodiella rata (G.Cunn.) P.K.Buchanan & Ryvarden (1988)
- Antrodiella reflexa Ryvarden & Núñez (1999) – Panama
- Antrodiella romellii (Donk) Niemelä (1982)
- Antrodiella semistipitata Bernicchia & Ryvarden (2007) – Italy
- Antrodiella semisupina (Berk. & M.A.Curtis) Ryvarden (1980)
- Antrodiella serpula (P.Karst.) Spirin & Niemelä (2006)
- Antrodiella stipitata H.S.Yuan & Y.C.Dai (2006) – northeast China
- Antrodiella subcrassa (Rodway & Cleland) P.K.Buchanan & Ryvarden (1993)
- Antrodiella subligativa (Corner) T.Hatt. & Sotome (2013)
- Antrodiella subradula (Pilát) Niemelä & Miettinen (2006)
- Antrodiella thompsonii Vampola & Pouzar (1996) – Europe
- Antrodiella tuberculata Ryvarden & Guzmán (2001) – Mexico
- Antrodiella ussurii Y.C.Dai & Niemelä (1997) – East Asia
- Antrodiella versicutis (Berk. & M.A.Curtis) Gilb. & Ryvarden (1986)
- Antrodiella xanthochroa (Corner) T.Hatt. (2003)
