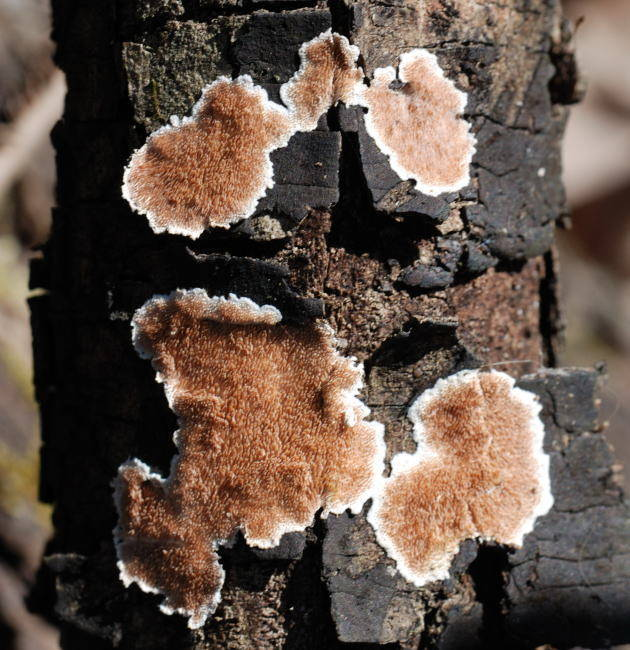
- Steccherinum ochraceum

Scientific classification
- Kingdom: Fungi
- Division: Basidiomycota
- Class: Agaricomycetes
- Order: Polyporales
- Family: Steccherinaceae; Parmasto (1968)

Type genus
- Steccherinum Gray (1821)

Synonyms
- Mycorrhaphiaceae Jülich (1982)

= Steccherinaceae =

Family of fungi

The Steccherinaceae are a family of about 200 species of fungi in the order Polyporales. It includes crust-like, toothed, and poroid species that cause a white rot in dead wood.

== Taxonomy ==
The family was circumscribed by Estonian mycologist Erast Parmasto in 1968. Parmasto's original concept included species that are today classified in the Agaricales, Hymenochaetales, Polyporales, and Russulales. A large-scale molecular study published in 2012 by Otto Miettinen and colleagues redefined the limits of the Steccherinaceae to include most species of the poroid and hydnoid genera Antrodiella, Junghuhnia, and Steccherinum, as well as members of 12 other hydnoid and poroid genera. These genera were traditionally classified in the families Phanerochaetaceae, Polyporaceae, and Meruliaceae. They commented: "we see the need for at least 30 monophyletic, morphologically distinguishable genera. These include no fewer than 15 new genera for both polypores and hydnoid fungi, and revival of several unused genus names." In a subsequent 2016 publication coauthored with Leif Ryvarden, Miettinen circumscribed several new genera—Antella, Austeria, Butyrea, Citripora, and Trulla. In a 2017 phylogenetic overview of the Polyporales, Alfredo Justo and colleagues have noted "The extreme morphological variation within the Steccherinaceae makes it very difficult to characterize the family by means other than phylogeny and a certain predominance of morphological characters."

Walter Jülich created the family Mycorrhaphiaceae to contain the type genus Mycorrhaphium. This family is now placed in synonymy with Steccherinaceae.

== Phylogenetics ==
The genus Xanthoporus and the Loweomyces clade occupy a basal position of the Steccherinaceae phylogenetic tree. The genus Antrodiella was found to be polyphyletic, containing species spread throughout 10 distinct clades in the Steccherinaceae. Although it is not known with certainty what the closest relatives of the Steccherinaceae are, the genera Climacocystis, Hypochnicium, Meripilus, Podoscypha, and Pouzaroporia consistently appear close regardless of the gene used for phylogenetic analysis.

Species in the core Antrodiella clade are very close genetically, even between species with a rather different spore shape, suggesting that these taxa may be undergoing ongoing rapid speciation. In some cases, DNA evidence shows that two morphologically nearly identical Antrodiella species are more distantly related than species that have larger phenotypic differences.

== Description ==
Most genera of the Steccherinaceae contain poroid or hydnoid fungi; Steccherinum contains both types. Steccherinaceae spores are usually broadly cylindrical or ellipsoid in shape. Characters useful for genus-level classification include fruit body colour and type, detailed hyphal structure, presence of cystidia, the strength of cyanophilic reactions of hyphae or spores, and the thickness of the spore walls. All species cause a white rot, and most grow on wood. Most of the species considered have a dimitic hyphal structure (containing both generative and skeletal hyphae), and most have clamps at the primary septa.

== Genera ==
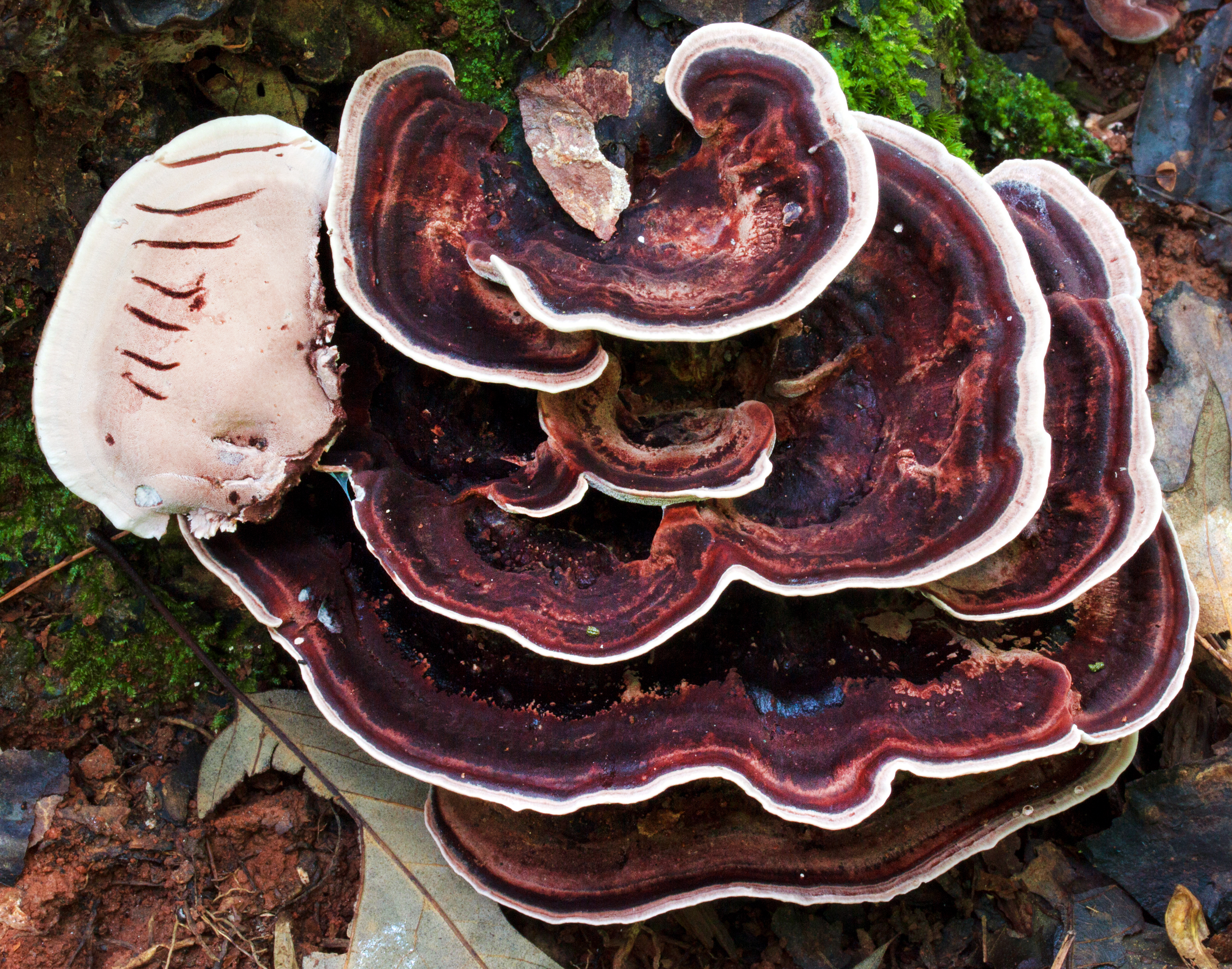
Nigroporus vinosus

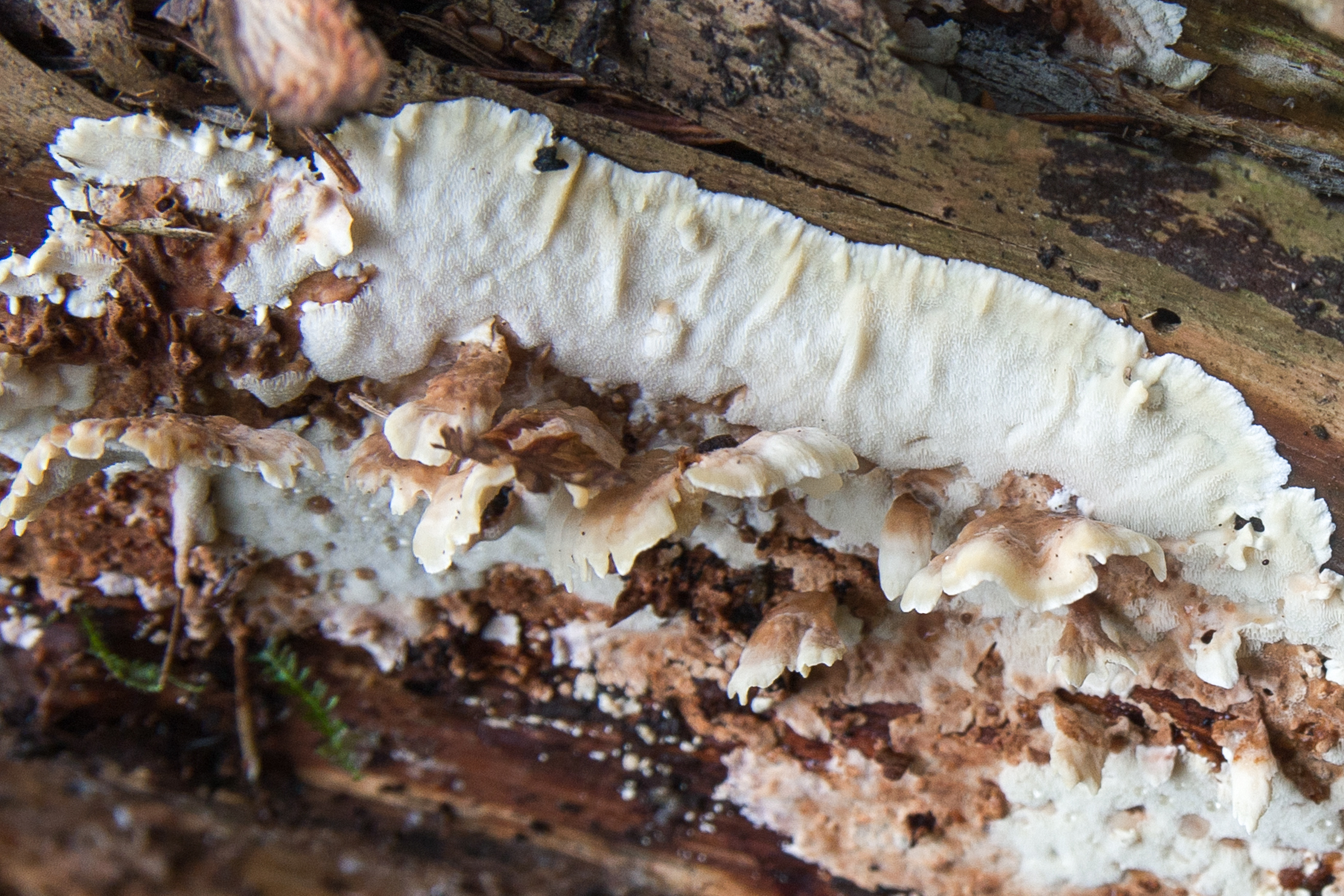
Antrodiella pallasii

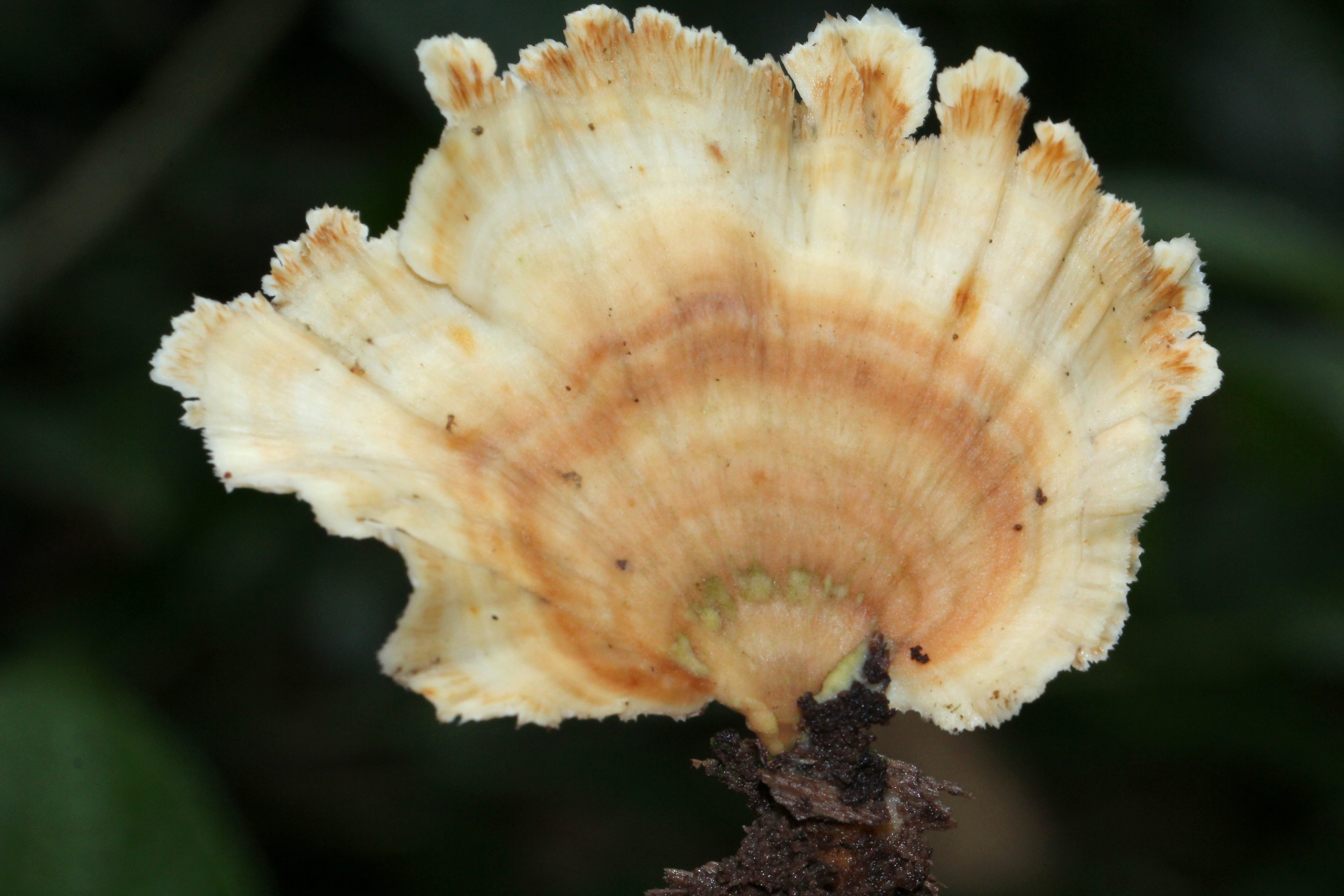
Flabellophora sp.

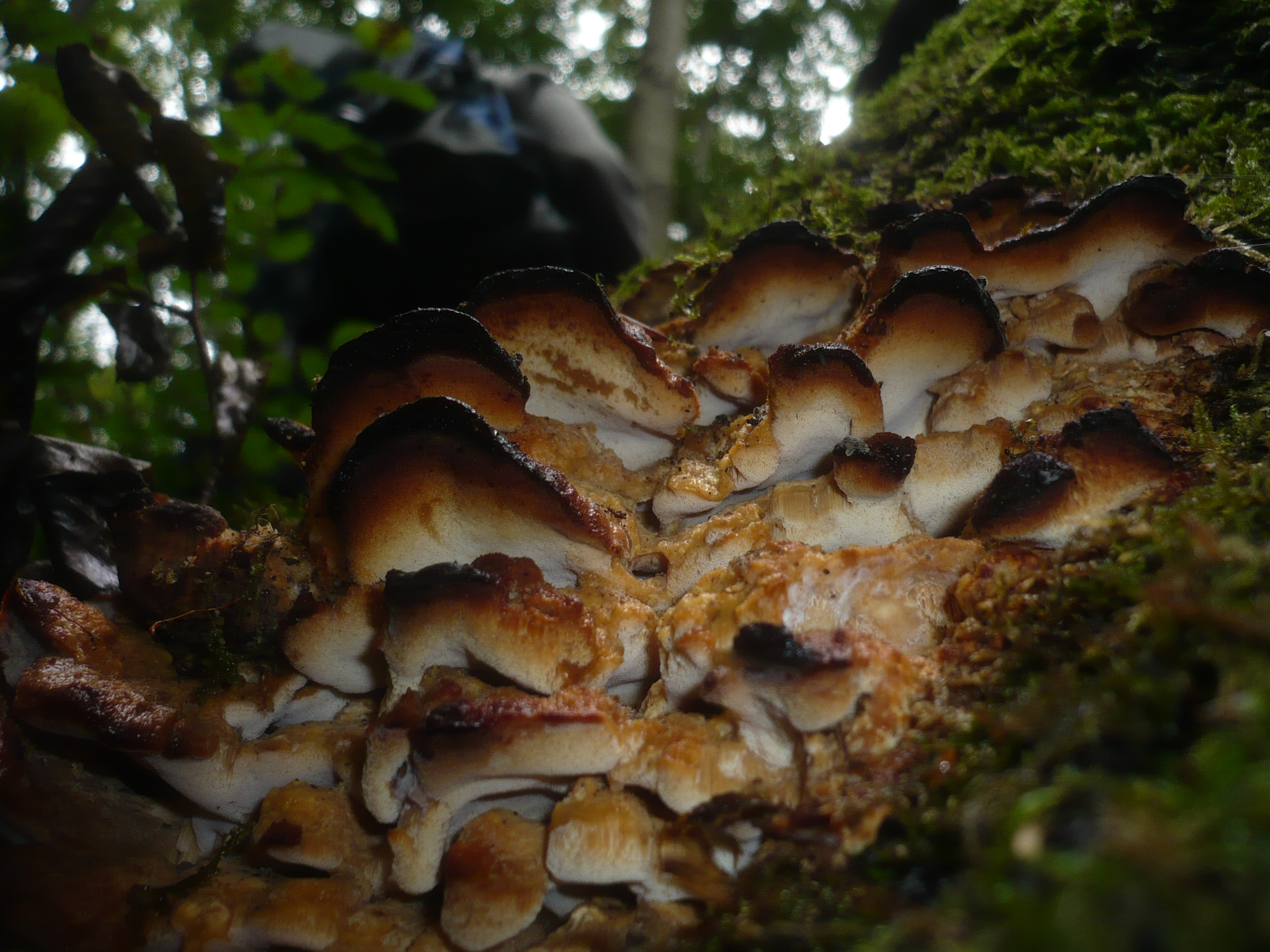
Frantisekia mentschulensis

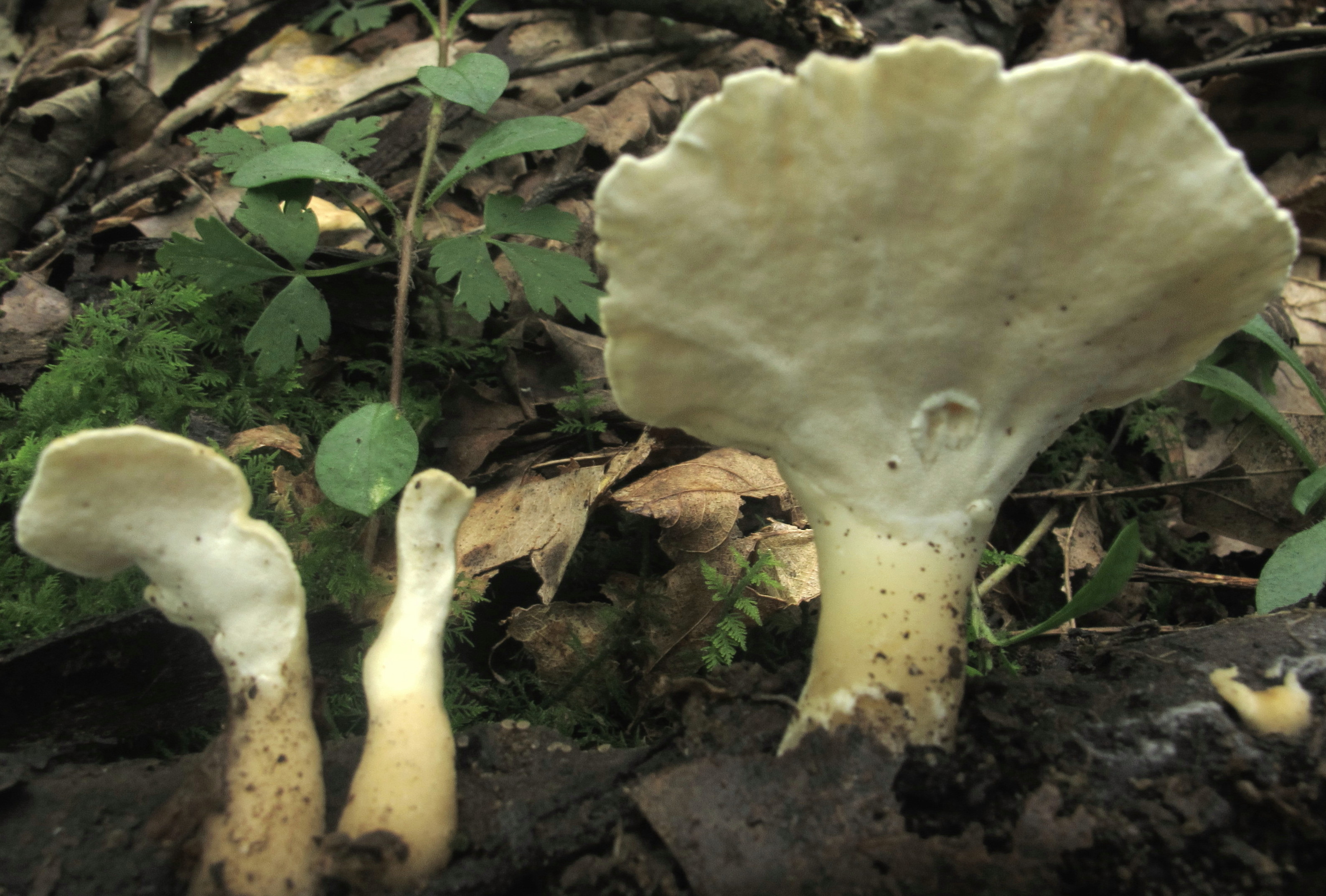
Loweomyces fractipes

- Antella Miettinen (2016); 3 species

Type: Antella niemelaei

- Antrodiella Ryvarden & I.Johans (1980); ~50 species

Type: Antrodiella semisupina

- Atraporiella Ryvarden (2007); 1 species

Type: Atraporiella neotropica

- Austeria Miettinen (2016); 1 species

Type: Austeria citrea

- Butyrea Miettinen (2016); 2 species

Type: Butyrea luteoalba

- Cabalodontia M.Piątek (2004); 5 species

Type: Cabalodontia queletii

- Caudicicola Miettinen, M.Kulju & Kotir. (2017); 1 species

Type: Caudicicola gracilis

- Chaetoporus P.Karst (1890); 1 species

Type: Chaetoporus tenuis

- Citropora Miettinen (2016); 2 species

Type: Citripora bannaensis

- Elaphroporia Z.Q. Wu & C.L. Zhao (2018); 1 species

Type: Elaphroporia ailaoshanensis

- Etheirodon Banker (1902); 1 species

Type: Etheirodon fimbriatum

- Flabellophora G.Cunn (1965); ~20 species

Type: Flabellophora superposita

- Flaviporus Murrill (1905); 12 species

Type: Flaviporus rufoflavus

- Frantisekia Spirin and Zmitr (2007); 3 species

Type: Frantisekia fissiliformis

- Junghuhnia Corda (1842); 36 species

Type: Junghuhnia crustacea

- Lamelloporus Ryvarden (1987); 1 species

Type: Lamelloporus americanus

- Loweomyces (Kotl. & Pouzar) Julich (1982); 6 species

Type: Loweomyces fractipes

- Metuloidea G.Cunn (1965); 4 species

Type: Metuloidea tawa

- Mycorrhaphium Maas Geest (1962); 6 species

Type: Mycorrhaphium adustum

- Nigroporus Murrill (1905); 5 species

Type: Nigroporus vinosus

- Steccherinum Gray (1821); ~ 30 species

Type: Steccherinum ochraceum

- Trulla Miettinen & Ryvarden (2016); 5 species

Type: Trulla dentipora

- Xanthoporus Audet (2010); 2 species

Type: Xanthoporus peckianus

Several genera are speculated to belong to the Steccherinaceae, although they have not yet been sampled: Amaurohydnum, Columnodontia, Cystidiodendron, Irpicochaete, Melzerodontia, Mycoleptodonoides, and Odontiochaete. The genus Irpex has historically been placed in the Steccherinaceae, but its type species, Irpex lacteus, is more closely related to Byssomerulius in the Phanerochaetaceae. Irpex is now placed as the type genus of family Irpicaceae.
