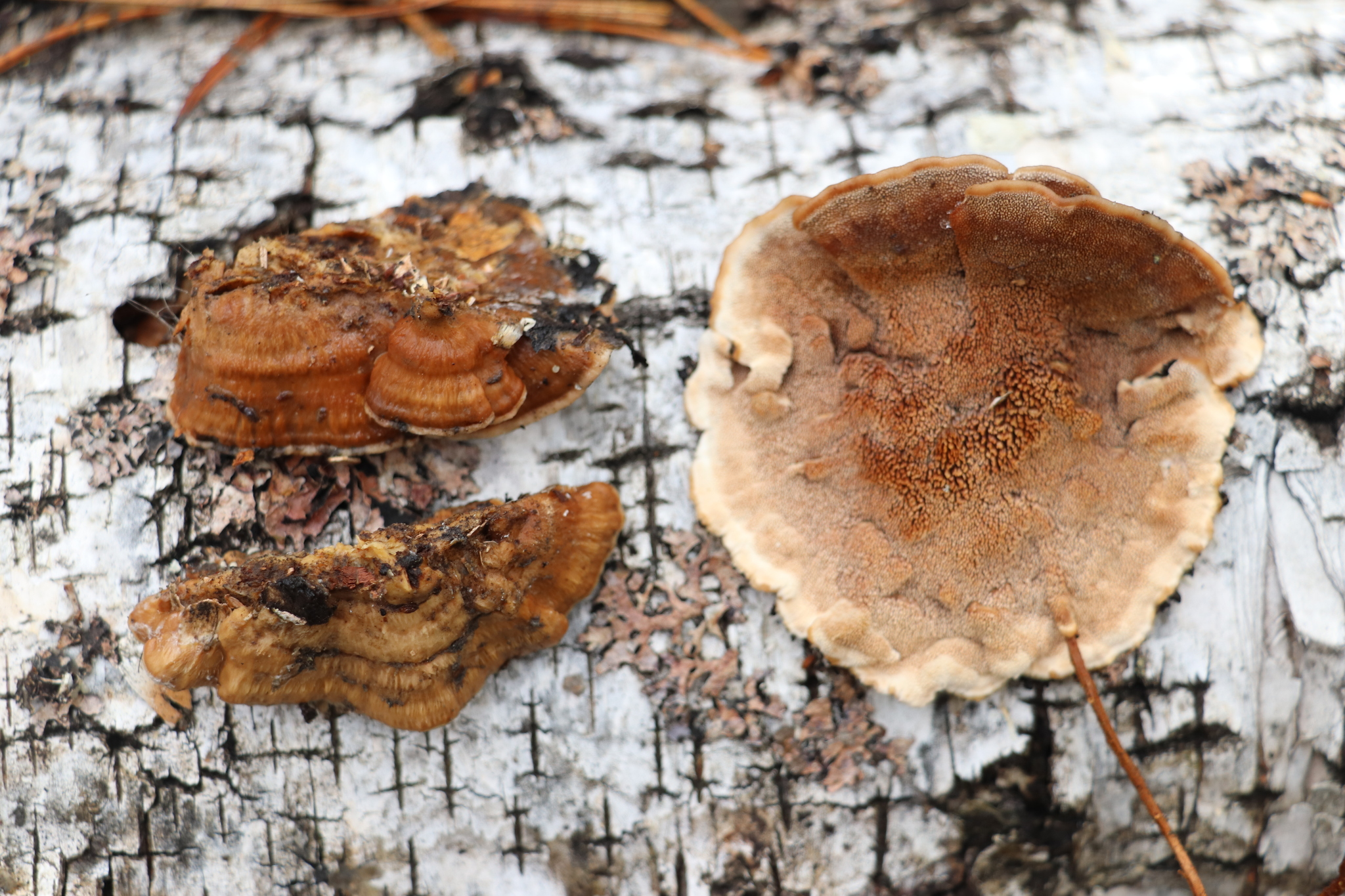

Scientific classification
- Domain: Eukaryota
- Kingdom: Fungi
- Division: Basidiomycota
- Class: Agaricomycetes
- Order: Polyporales
- Family: Steccherinaceae
- Genus: Metuloidea
- Species: M. murashkinskyi

Binomial name
- Metuloidea murashkinskyi (Burt) Miettinen & Spirin (2016)

Synonyms
- List: Hydnum murashkinskyi Burt (1931); Mycoleptodon murashkinskyi (Burt) Pilát (1934); Steccherinum murashkinskyi (Burt) Maas Geest. (1962); Irpex murashkinskyi (Burt) Kotir. & Saaren. (2002)

= Metuloidea murashkinskyi =

Species of fungus

Metuloidea murashkinskyi Mycological characteristics
- Teeth on hymenium
- Hymenium attachment is not applicable
- Lacks a stipe
- Ecology is saprotrophic
- Edibility is inedible

Metuloidea murashkinskyi is a species of tooth fungus in the family Steccherinaceae. It is found in Europe and Asia, where it causes a white rot on the wood of deciduous trees.

== Taxonomy ==
The fungus was first described in 1931 by American mycologist Edward Angus Burt as Hydnum murashkinskyi. He named it after professor K.E. Murashkinsky of the Siberian Agricultural Academy, who collected the type specimens in 1928 and sent them to Burt for identification. The species was later transferred to the genera Mycoleptodon by Albert Pilát in 1934, Steccherinum by Rudolph Arnold Maas Geesteranus in 1962, and Irpex by Heikki Kotiranda & Reima Saarenoksa in 2002. Miettinen & Spirin transferred it to the newly-circumscribed genus Metuloidea in 2016.

== Description ==
The fruit bodies of Metuloidea murashkinskyi are somewhat cap-like but adhere firmly to the substrate without a stipe, and measure 5–14 cm (2.0–5.5 in) by 10–50 cm (4–20 in) by 1–5 mm thick. They have a leathery texture when fresh, but become fragile when dry. The cap surface is initially tomentose, later becoming smooth and zonate with an uneven surface and a cinnamon-brown colour. The spore-bearing surface, or hymenium, is hydnoid—that is, bearing structures resembling small conical spines measuring 0.5–5 mm long. These spines are packed together quite densely, about 4 to 6 per millimetre, and have a smoke-brown colour. In some instances, the spines fuse together to form irregular pores numbering 4–5 per millimetre. Fruit bodies have a distinctive spicy odour that lingers even in dried herbarium specimens. This odour is characteristic of the genus Metuloidea.

Metuloidea murashkinskyi has a dimitic hyphal structure with thick-walled sclerified generative hyphae that are 5–7 μm. The spores are shaped like short cylinders, and typically measure 3.6–4.5 by 2.8–2.3 μm. The pseudocystidia are thick-walled and are 4.5–7.5 μm wide at the apex. The basidia measure 9–12 x 2.4–3.6 μm.

== Habitat and distribution ==
Metuloidea murashkinskyi is a white rot fungus that feeds on the dead wood of deciduous trees. It is known to occur in the Russian Far East, Slovakia, China, and Korea. It is found on birch, aspen and oak trees.

== Research ==
A 2016 study reported that Metuloidea murashkinskyi has a strong ability to grow on oil-contaminated substrates, particularly oil-aliphatic hydrocarbons, and may have potential as a bioremediant of oil-contaminated peat soil.

== Similar Species ==
Metuloidea murashkinskyi can be confused with old specimens of Irpex lacteus, as it can occasionally be poroid instead of hydnoid. Irpex lacteus however does not have clamp connections, and has smaller pores.
