= Gloeoporus orientalis =

Scientific classification
- Domain: Eukaryota
- Kingdom: Fungi
- Division: Basidiomycota
- Class: Agaricomycetes
- Order: Polyporales
- Family: Irpicaceae
- Genus: Gloeoporus
- Species: G. orientalis

Binomial name
- Gloeoporus orientalis P.E.Jung & Y.W.Lim (2018)

Species of fungus

Gloeoporus orientalis is a species of crust fungus in the family Irpicaceae. Found in East Asia, it was described as a new species in 2018 by Paul Jung and Young Wood Lim. The type collection was made in Geojedo, Korea, where it was found growing on a fallen angiosperm trunk.

Gloeoporus orientalis has a monomitic hyphal system, and its generative hyphae have clamp connections. Its spores are sausage-shaped (allantoid), measuring 3.0–3.6 by 0.6–0.8 μm, while the basidia are club shaped and measure 11.4–12.5 by 2.5–2.8 μm. G. dichrous is similar in appearance to G. orientalis, but can the former can be distinguished by its larger pores, larger basidia, and the more cylindrical shape of its spores. G. orientalis has been found in China, Taiwan, Korea, and Japan.
