= Ceriporia albomellea =

Scientific classification
- Kingdom: Fungi
- Division: Basidiomycota
- Class: Agaricomycetes
- Order: Polyporales
- Family: Irpicaceae
- Genus: Ceriporia
- Species: C. albomellea

Binomial name
- Ceriporia albomellea Yuan Yuan, Jia J.Chen & X.H.Ji (2017)

Species of fungus

Ceriporia albomellea is a species of crust fungus in the family Irpicaceae. Found in tropical China, it was described as new to science in 2017 by mycologists Yuan Yuan, Xiao-Hong Ji, Fang Wu, and Jia-Jia Chen. A 2020 molecular phylogenetic study transferred the species to the genus Meruliopsis as Meruliopsis albomellea, after finding that Ceriporia sensu lato is polyphyletic.

== Taxonomy ==
Ceriporia albomellea was described in 2017 and published in Phytotaxa. The type specimen was collected from Hainan Island in southern China, a location noted for its rich diversity of wood-inhabiting fungi. The specific epithet albomellea derives from the Latin albus ("white") and melleus ("honey-coloured"), referring to the white to cinnamon-buff pore surface of the fruit body. The species was originally placed in the family Phanerochaetaceae following its initial description.

Phylogenetic evidence based on internal transcribed spacer (ITS) and nuclear large subunit (nLSU) ribosomal RNA gene sequences supported C. albomellea as a distinct species within a clade of Meruliopsis rather than Ceriporia sensu stricto. In 2020, Che-Chih Chen, Chi-Yu Chen, Young Woon Lim, and Sheng-Hua Wu published a comprehensive phylogenetic study of Ceriporia and related genera, using ITS, nLSU, and RNA polymerase II (rpb1) sequence data. Their analysis showed that Ceriporia sensu lato is polyphyletic, with members distributed across multiple clades in the Irpicaceae, Phanerochaetaceae, and Meruliaceae. Four species previously placed in Ceriporia were recovered within Meruliopsis and formally transferred to that genus, including C. albomellea as Meruliopsis albomellea. M. albomellea is phylogenetically closely related to M. crassitunicata, M. variegata, and M. parvispora, all of which share white to cream fruit bodies, but M. albomellea differs from M. parvispora by the presence of cystidia.

== Description ==
The fruit body is thin, crust-like, and grows flat against the substrate. It has a white subiculum (inner tissue layer) and a cottony white margin. The pore surface is white to cinnamon-buff in colour, with the hyphal system being monomitic (composed of a single type of hyphae), with simple-septate generative hyphae. Cystidia are clavate (club-shaped). The basidia bear four spores each. The spores are oblong to ellipsoid, hyaline (translucent), smooth, and measure 3.1–3.8 by 1.7–2 μm. They are non-reactive in Melzer's reagent and cotton blue.

== Habitat and distribution ==
Ceriporia albomellea is a saprotroph that causes white rot on well-decayed wood. Like other members of Ceriporia and Meruliopsis, it obtains nutrients by decomposing lignin and cellulose in dead wood using ligninolytic enzymes. The species is known only from tropical China, where the type specimen was collected from Hainan Island.
