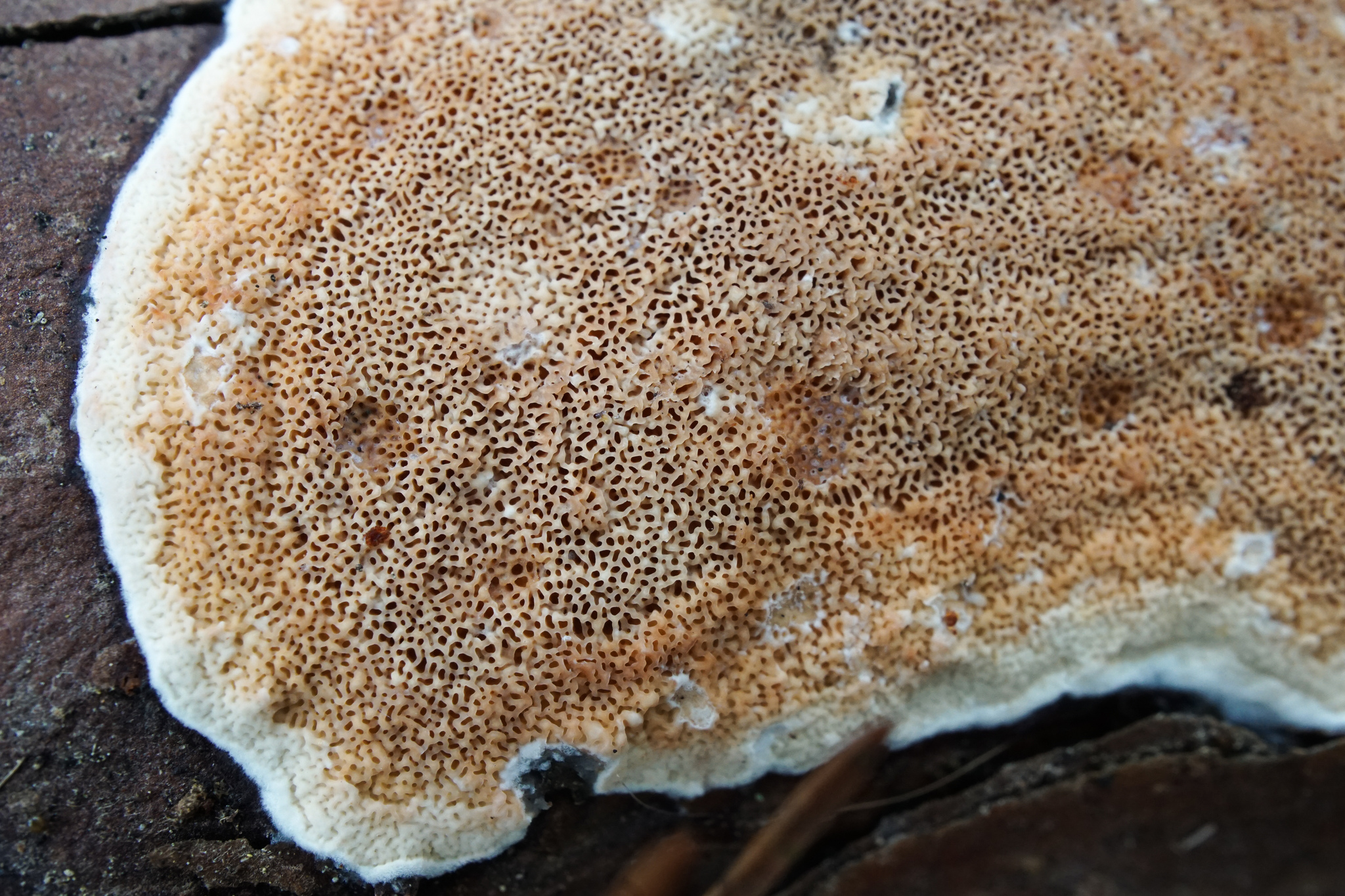

Scientific classification
- Kingdom: Fungi
- Division: Basidiomycota
- Class: Agaricomycetes
- Order: Polyporales
- Family: Irpicaceae
- Genus: Gloeoporus
- Species: G. taxicola

Binomial name
- Gloeoporus taxicola (Pers.) Gilb. & Ryvarden, 1985

Synonyms
- Meruliopsis taxicola (Pers.) Bondartsev, 1959

= Gloeoporus taxicola =

Species of fungus

Gloeoporus taxicola is a species of fungus belonging to the family Irpicaceae.
