= Ceriporia inflata =

Scientific classification
- Domain: Eukaryota
- Kingdom: Fungi
- Division: Basidiomycota
- Class: Agaricomycetes
- Order: Polyporales
- Family: Irpicaceae
- Genus: Ceriporia
- Species: C. inflata

Binomial name
- Ceriporia inflata B.S.Jia & B.K.Cui (2013)

Species of fungus

Ceriporia inflata is a species of crust fungus in the family Irpicaceae. It was described as new to science in 2013 by mycologists Bi-Si Jia and Bao-Kai Cui. The fungus is distinguished macroscopically from other Ceriporia species by its relatively large pores, and microscopically by its hyphae, which swell when KOH is applied; it is this latter feature for which the fungus is named. The type specimen of C. inflata was collected from Qiongzhong County (Hainan, China), where it was found growing on rotten angiosperm wood. It has also been recorded from Fenyi County in Jiangxi.

== Description ==
Ceriporia inflata has crust-like fruit bodies that become corky or brittle when they are dry. They reach dimensions of up to 13 cm (5.1 in) long, 7 cm (2.8 in) wide, and 3 mm (0.12 in) thick at the centre. The pore surface, initially white to cream, later becomes buff or darker in age. The pores are angular to irregular in outline, numbering 2–3 per millimetre. The fungus makes sausage-shaped to cylindrical spores that are smooth, thin-walled, hyaline, and measure 4.7–5.2 by 2–2.4 μm. C. inflata causes a white rot.
