= Ceriporia xylostromatoides =

Scientific classification
- Domain: Eukaryota
- Kingdom: Fungi
- Division: Basidiomycota
- Class: Agaricomycetes
- Order: Polyporales
- Family: Irpicaceae
- Genus: Ceriporia
- Species: C. xylostromatoides

Binomial name
- Ceriporia xylostromatoides (Berk.) Ryvarden (1980)

Synonyms
- Polyporus xylostromatoides Berk. (1843); Polyporus interruptus Berk. & Broome (1875); Poria xylostromatoides (Berk.) Cooke (1886); Poria interrupta (Berk. & Broome) Sacc. (1888); Poria subambigua Bres. (1911); Poria aquosa Petch (1916); Poria corioliformis Murrill (1920); Poria cremeicolor Murrill (1920); Poria subcollapsa Murrill (1920); Poria subcorticola Murrill (1920); Poria submollusca Murrill (1920); Polyporus submollusca Murrill (1920); Poria velata Rick (1937); Rigidoporus xylostromatoides (Berk.) Ryvarden (1973); Physisporinus xylostromatoides (Berk.) Y.C.Dai (1998)

Species of fungus

Ceriporia xylostromatoides is a species of fungus in the family Irpicaceae. It is a plant pathogen.
