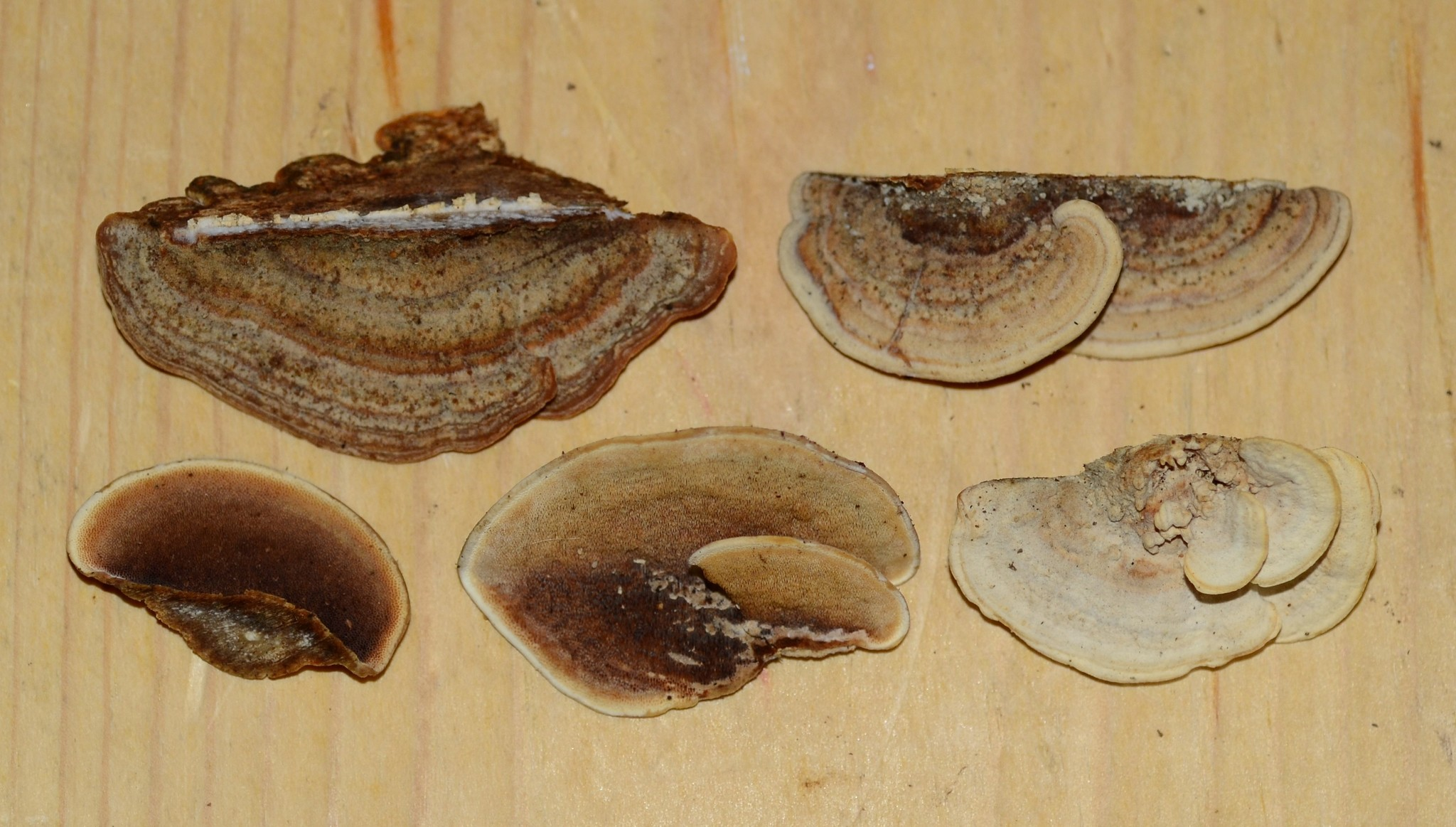
- Metuloidea reniformis

Scientific classification
- Domain: Eukaryota
- Kingdom: Fungi
- Division: Basidiomycota
- Class: Agaricomycetes
- Order: Polyporales
- Family: Steccherinaceae
- Genus: Metuloidea; G.Cunn. (1965)

Type species
- Metuloidea tawa (G.Cunn.) G.Cunn. (1965)

Species
- M. cinnamomea M. fragrans M. murashkinskyi M. rhinocephala M. tawa

= Metuloidea =

Genus of fungi

Metuloidea is a genus of five species of fungi in the family Steccherinaceae. The genus was circumscribed by New Zealand-based mycologist Gordon Herriot Cunningham in 1965. The type species is M. tawa, a fungus originally described by Cunningham as a species of Trametes. Formerly classified in family Meruliaceae, Metuloidea was moved to the Steccherinaceae in 2016, following prior research that outlined a revised framework for the Steccherinaceae based on molecular phylogenetics.

== Description ==
Metuloidea contains fungi that produce poroid or hydnoid fruit bodies that are brown and have a sweet odour. It features a dimitic hyphal system with branched, relatively wide skeletal hyphae (3–5 μm). The spores are ellipsoid to cylindrical, thin walled, and measure 3–4 by 2–2.8 μm.

== Species ==
- Metuloidea cinnamomea (Iturr. & Ryvarden) Miettinen & Ryvarden (2016)
- Metuloidea fragrans (A.David & Tortic) Miettinen (2016)
- Metuloidea murashkinskyi (Burt) Miettinen & Spirin (2016)
- Metuloidea reniformis (Berk. & M.A. Curtis) Westphalen & Motato-Vásq. (2021)
- Metuloidea rhinocephala (Berk.) Miettinen (2016)
- Metuloidea tawa (G.Cunn.) G.Cunn. (1965) – New Zealand; Australia
