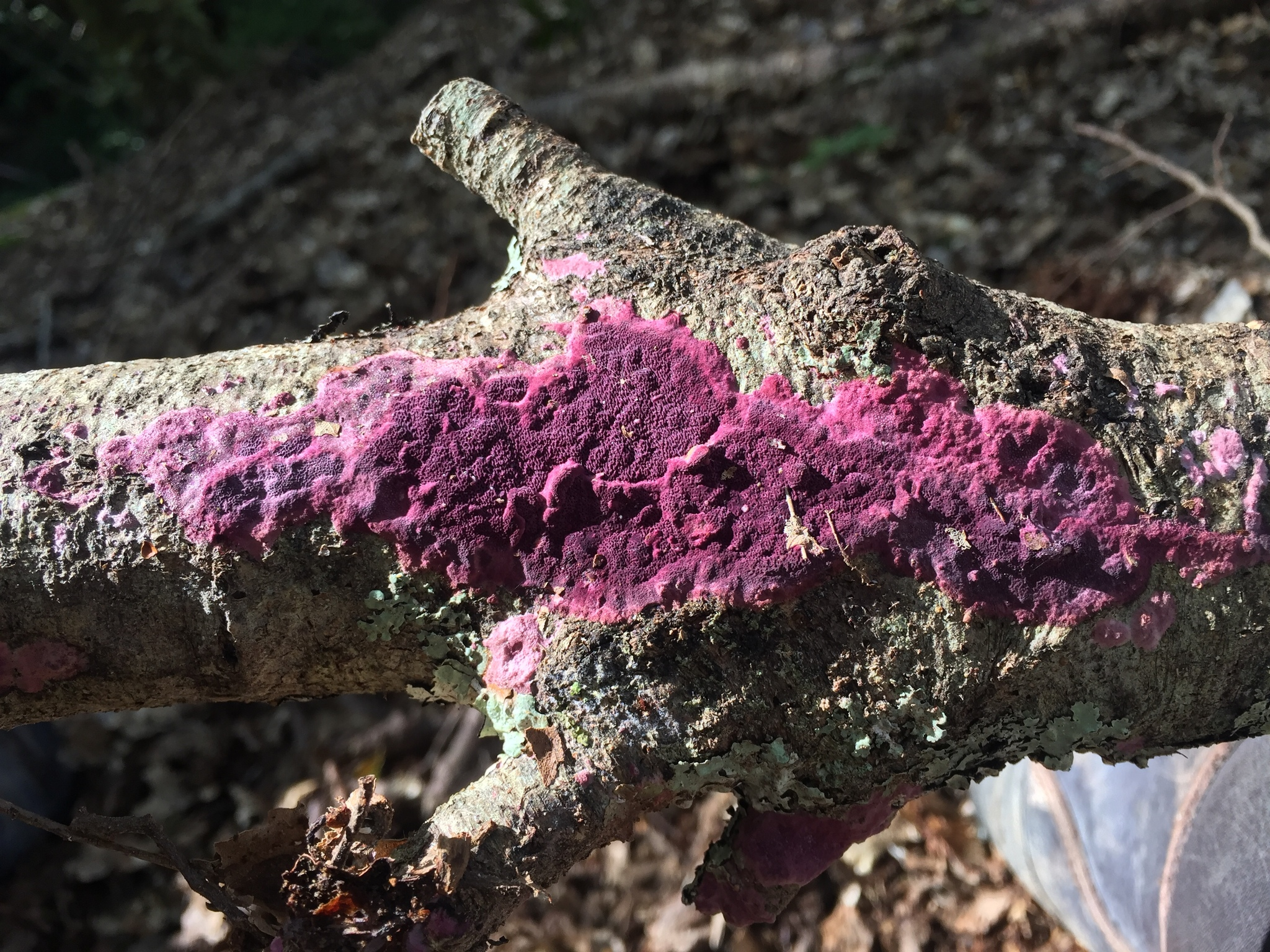

Scientific classification
- Kingdom: Fungi
- Division: Basidiomycota
- Class: Agaricomycetes
- Order: Polyporales
- Family: Irpicaceae
- Genus: Byssomerulius
- Species: B. psittacinus

Binomial name
- Byssomerulius psittacinus P.K.Buchanan, Ryvarden & Izawa (2000)

= Byssomerulius psittacinus =

Species of fungus

Byssomerulius psittacinus is a species of crust fungus in the family Irpicaceae. The specific epithet psittacinus ("parrot-like") refers to the wide range of colours observed in the fruit bodies.

It was described as new to science in 2000 by mycologists Peter Buchanan, Leif Ryvarden, and Masana Izawa. The type was found in Fiordland National Park, where it was growing on the dead wood of Nothofagus.

It is uncommon and found only on southern beech species in the North and South Islands of New Zealand.

Initially a striking reddish-purple when fresh, it dries to brownish orange, pale orange yellow, or pale orange.
