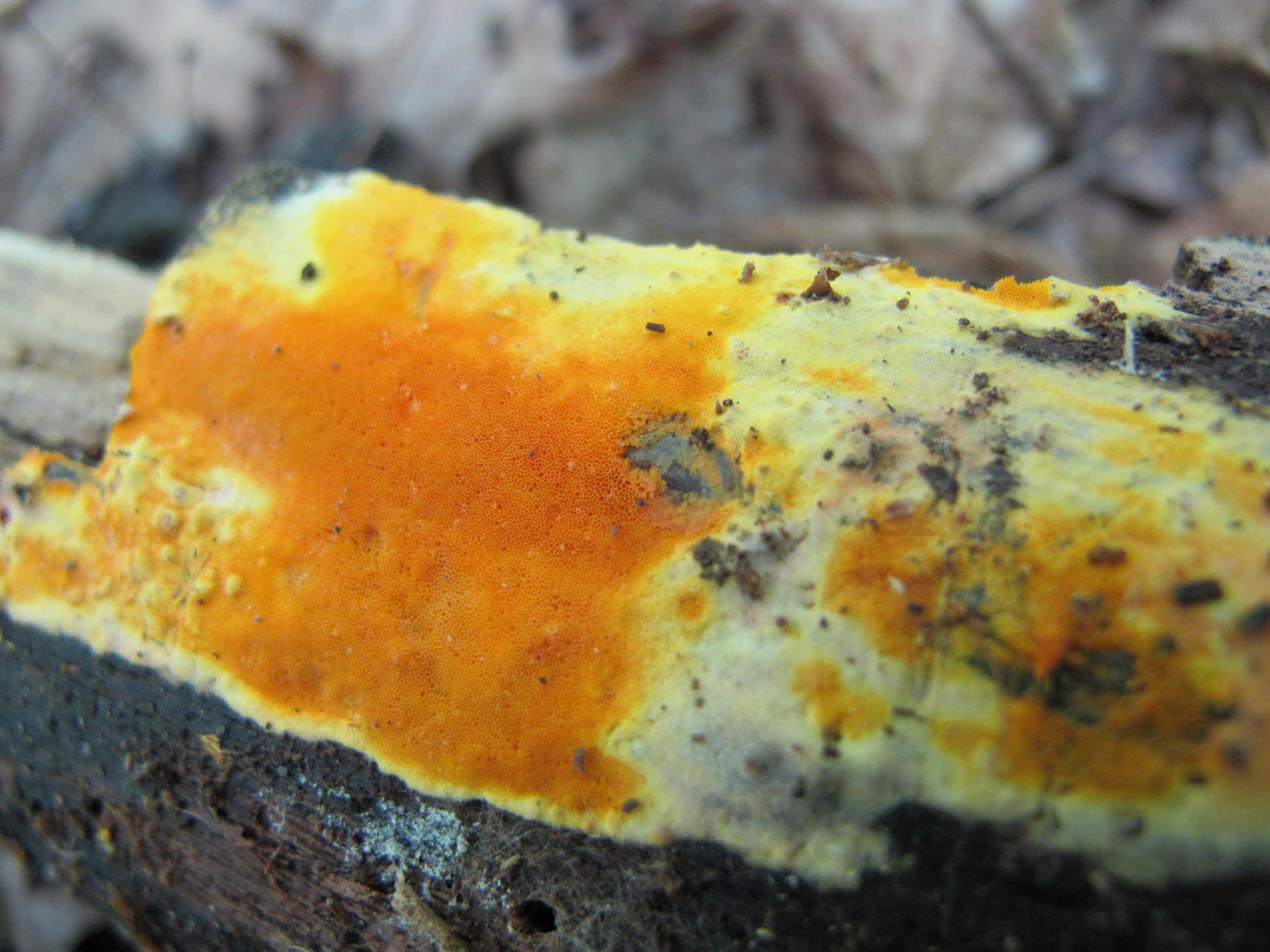

Scientific classification
- Domain: Eukaryota
- Kingdom: Fungi
- Division: Basidiomycota
- Class: Agaricomycetes
- Order: Polyporales
- Family: Irpicaceae
- Genus: Ceriporia
- Species: C. spissa

Binomial name
- Ceriporia spissa (Schwein. ex Fr.) Rajchenb. (1983)

Synonyms
- Boletus juglandinus Schwein. [as 'iuglandinus'] (1822); Caloporus spissus (Schwein. ex Fr.) Ryvarden (1973); Meruliopsis spissa (Schwein. ex Fr.) Parmasto (1968); Mucronoporus spissus (Schwein.) Ellis & Everh. (1889); Physisporinus spissus (Schwein. ex Fr.) Murrill (1942); Polyporus crociporus Berk. & M.A. Curtis (1856); Polyporus cruentatus Mont., (1854); Polyporus spissus Schwein. ex Fr. (1828); Poria crocipora (Berk. & M.A. Curtis) Sacc. (1888); Poria cruentata (Mont.) Sacc. (1888); Poria juglandiana (Schwein.) Sacc. (1888); Poria spissa (Schwein. ex Fr.) Cooke (1886)

= Ceriporia spissa =

Species of fungus

Ceriporia spissa is a species of fungus in the family Irpicaceae. It is a plant pathogen.
