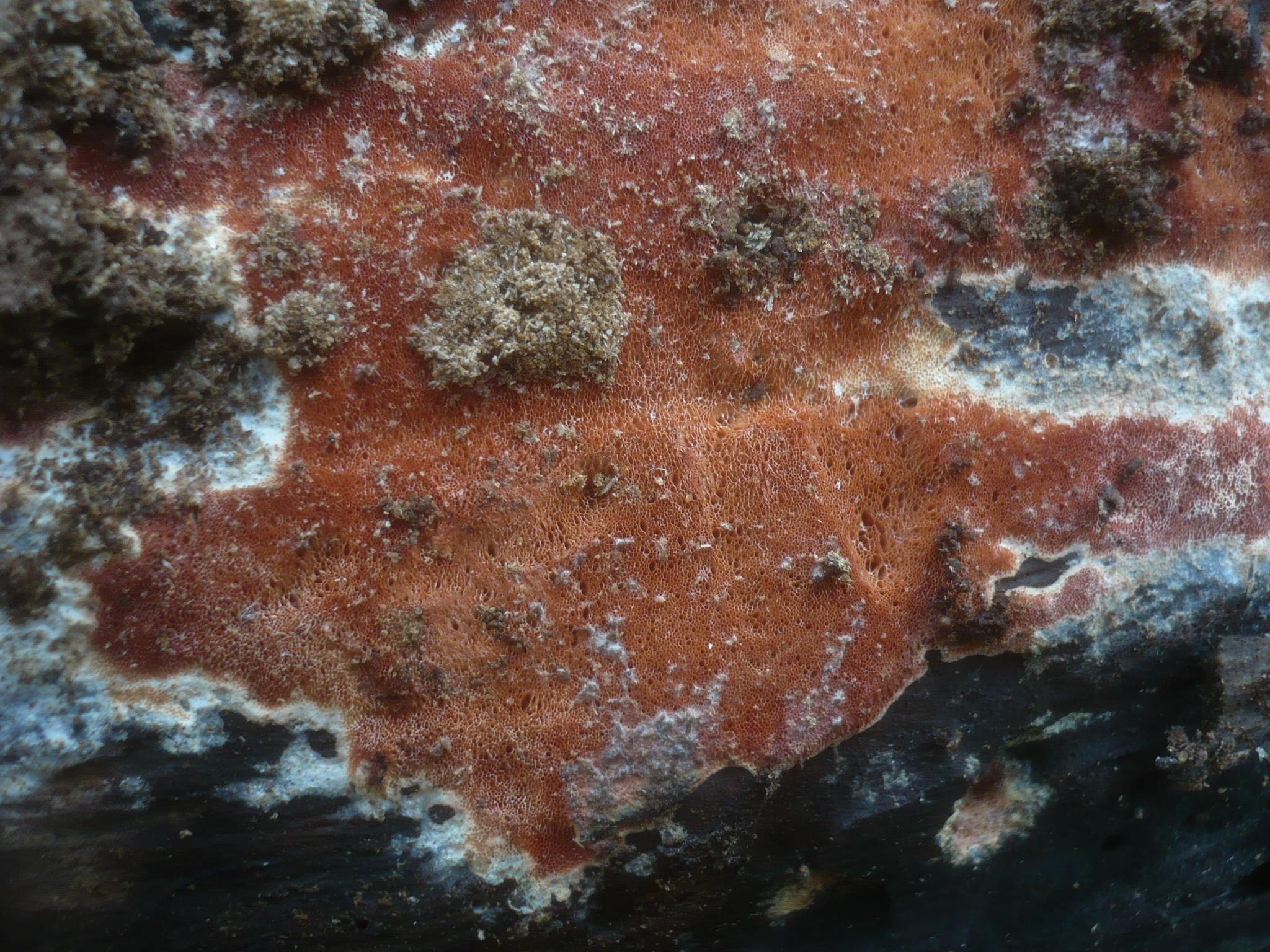

Scientific classification
- Kingdom: Fungi
- Division: Basidiomycota
- Class: Agaricomycetes
- Order: Polyporales
- Family: Irpicaceae
- Genus: Ceriporia
- Species: C. purpurea

Binomial name
- Ceriporia purpurea (Fr.) Donk (1971)

Synonyms
- Polyporus purpureus Fr. (1821); Physisporus purpureus (Fr.) Gillet (1878); Poria purpurea (Fr.) Cooke (1886); Merulioporia purpurea (Fr.) Bondartsev & Singer (1941); Merulioporia purpurea (Fr.) Bondartsev & Singer (1953); Meruliopsis purpurea (Fr.) Bondartsev (1959); Ceriporia purpurea (Fr.) Komarova (1964); Gloeoporus purpureus (Fr.) Zmitr. & Spirin (2006)

= Ceriporia purpurea =

Species of fungus

Ceriporia purpurea is a species of crust fungus in the family Irpicaceae. It was first described by Swedish mycologist Elias Magnus Fries in 1821 as Polyporus purpureus. Marinus Anton Donk gave the fungus its current name when he transferred it to the genus Ceriporia in 1971.

A 2016 study identified six similar Ceriporia species, referred to as the Ceriporia purpurea group: Ceriporia bresadolae, the European species C. torpida and C. triumphalis, and the North American species C. manzanitae and C. occidentalis. Ceriporia purpurea is widely distributed in the temperate zone of Eurasia, where it grows exclusively on the decomposing wood of deciduous trees, and also in the American North-East.
