= Irpex destruens =

Scientific classification
- Domain: Eukaryota
- Kingdom: Fungi
- Division: Basidiomycota
- Class: Agaricomycetes
- Order: Polyporales
- Family: Irpicaceae
- Genus: Irpex
- Species: I. destruens

Binomial name
- Irpex destruens Petch (1909)

Species of fungus

Irpex destruens is a species of fungus in the family Irpicaceae. A plant pathogen, it causes stump rot. It was first described scientifically by English mycologist Thomas Petch in 1909.
