= Ceriporia amazonica =

Scientific classification
- Domain: Eukaryota
- Kingdom: Fungi
- Division: Basidiomycota
- Class: Agaricomycetes
- Order: Polyporales
- Family: Irpicaceae
- Genus: Ceriporia
- Species: C. amazonica

Binomial name
- Ceriporia amazonica A.M.S.Soares, H.M.P.Sotão & Ryvarden (2014)

Species of fungus

Ceriporia amazonica is a species of crust fungus in the family Irpicaceae. Found in Brazil, it was described as new to science in 2014. The fungus is characterized by its salmon-coloured pore surface with angular pores numbering 1–3 per millimetre, and small ellipsoid spores (measuring 2–3 μm) that are among the smallest in genus Ceriporia. The type locality is Amapá National Forest, in the Brazilian Amazon, for which the species is named.
