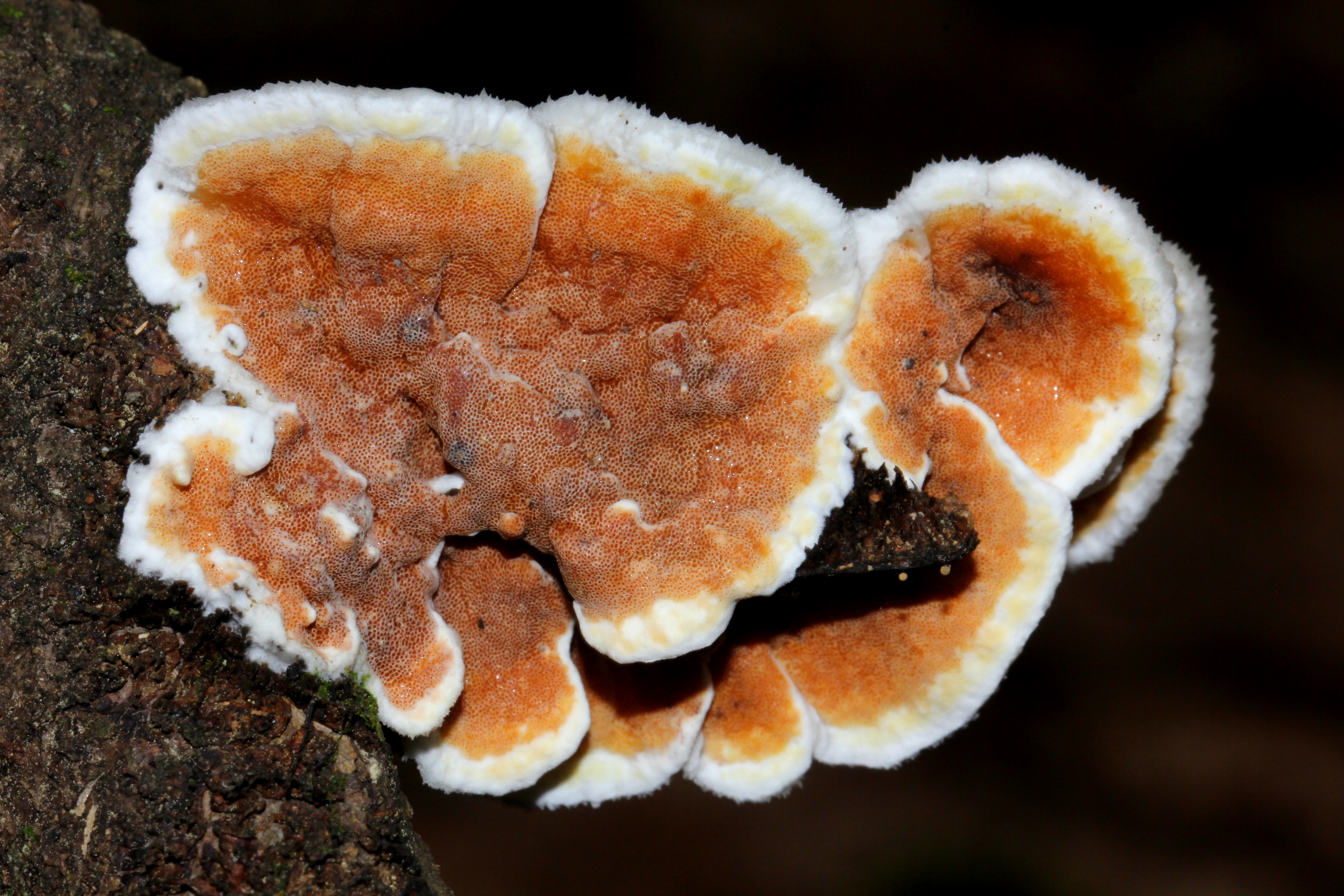
- Gloeoporus dichrous

Scientific classification
- Kingdom: Fungi
- Division: Basidiomycota
- Class: Agaricomycetes
- Order: Polyporales
- Family: Irpicaceae
- Genus: Gloeoporus; Mont. (1842)

Type species
- Gloeoporus conchoides Mont. (1842)

= Gloeoporus =

Genus of fungi

Gloeoporus is a genus of crust fungi in the family Irpicaceae. The genus has a widespread distribution.

== Taxonomy ==
Gloeoporus was created by French mycologist Camille Montagne in 1842 to contain the subtropical species Gloeoporus conchoides. The fungus is now known as Gloeoporus thelephoroides. The genus name combines the Ancient Greek words γλοιός ("sticky") and πόρος ("pore").

Although traditionally classified in the family Meruliaceae, molecular phylogenetic analysis supports the placement of Gloeoporus in the Irpicaceae. A recent (2018) revision of the taxonomic status and generic limits of Gloeoporus using molecular phylogenetics revealed a polyphyletic genus, and the subsequent transfer of some species to Meruliopsis.

== Description ==
Gloeoporus fungi have pore surfaces featuring a pinkish white, cream, or orange to deep reddish colour. The pores are small. The texture of the fruit bodies surface is gelatinous when fresh, but becomes resinous and cartilaginous when dry.

== Species ==
As of June 2017, Index Fungorum accepts 30 species in Gloeoporus:

- G. acidulus Bondartseva (1970)
- G. ambiguus (Berk.) Zmitr. & Spirin (2006)
- G. africanus P.E.Jung & Y.W.Lim (2018) – Uganda
- G. bourdotii (Pilát) Bondartsev & Singer (1941)
- G. carrii Corner (1989)
- G. chlorinus (Pat.) Ginns (1976)
- G. citrinoalbus Yuan Yuan & Jia J.Chen (2016) – China
- G. citrinus Ryvarden (1975) – East Africa
- G. cremeoalbus Corner (1989) – Japan
- G. croceopallens Bres. (1912)
- G. dichrous (Fr.) Bres. (1913)
- G. dimiticus Corner (1989) – Malaya
- G. friabilis Corner (1989) – East Asia
- G. hainanensis Yuan Yuan & Jia J.Chen (2016) – Hainan, China
- G. hispidus Corner (1989) – Borneo
- G. longisporus M.Mata & Ryvarden (2010) – Costa Rica
- G. nigrescens Corner (1989) – Malaya
- G. orientalis P.E.Jung & Y.W.Lim (2018) – East Asia
- G. pannocinctus (Romell) J.Erikss. (1958) – Europe
- G. papuanus Corner (1989) – Papua New Guinea
- G. phlebophorus (Berk.) G.Cunn. (1965) – Australia
- G. purpurascens Hjortstam (1995)
- G. similis Corner (1989) – Johor, Malaysia
- G. subambiguus (Henn.) Ginns (1976)
- G. subochraceus Corner (1989) – Borneo
- G. subvinaceus Corner (1992)
- G. sulphureus Corner (1989) – Borneo
- G. sulphuricolor (Bernicchia & Niemelä) Zmitr. & Spirin (2006)
- G. taxicola (Pers.) Gilb. & Ryvarden (1985)
- G. thelephoroides (Hook.) G.Cunn. (1965) – Africa; South America
- G. tienmuensis (Teng) Teng (1963)
- G. umbrinus Corner (1989) – Borneo
- G. vitellinus Corner (1992)

Some cystidium-forming species formerly placed in Gloeoporus were transferred to Meruliopsis in 2018 based on molecular phylogenetic analysis, including Gloeoporus guerreroanus and Gloeoporus cystidiatus. They join Meruliopsis taxicola, which was also once referred to Gloeoporus because of its morphological similarities with Gloeoporus dichrous.
