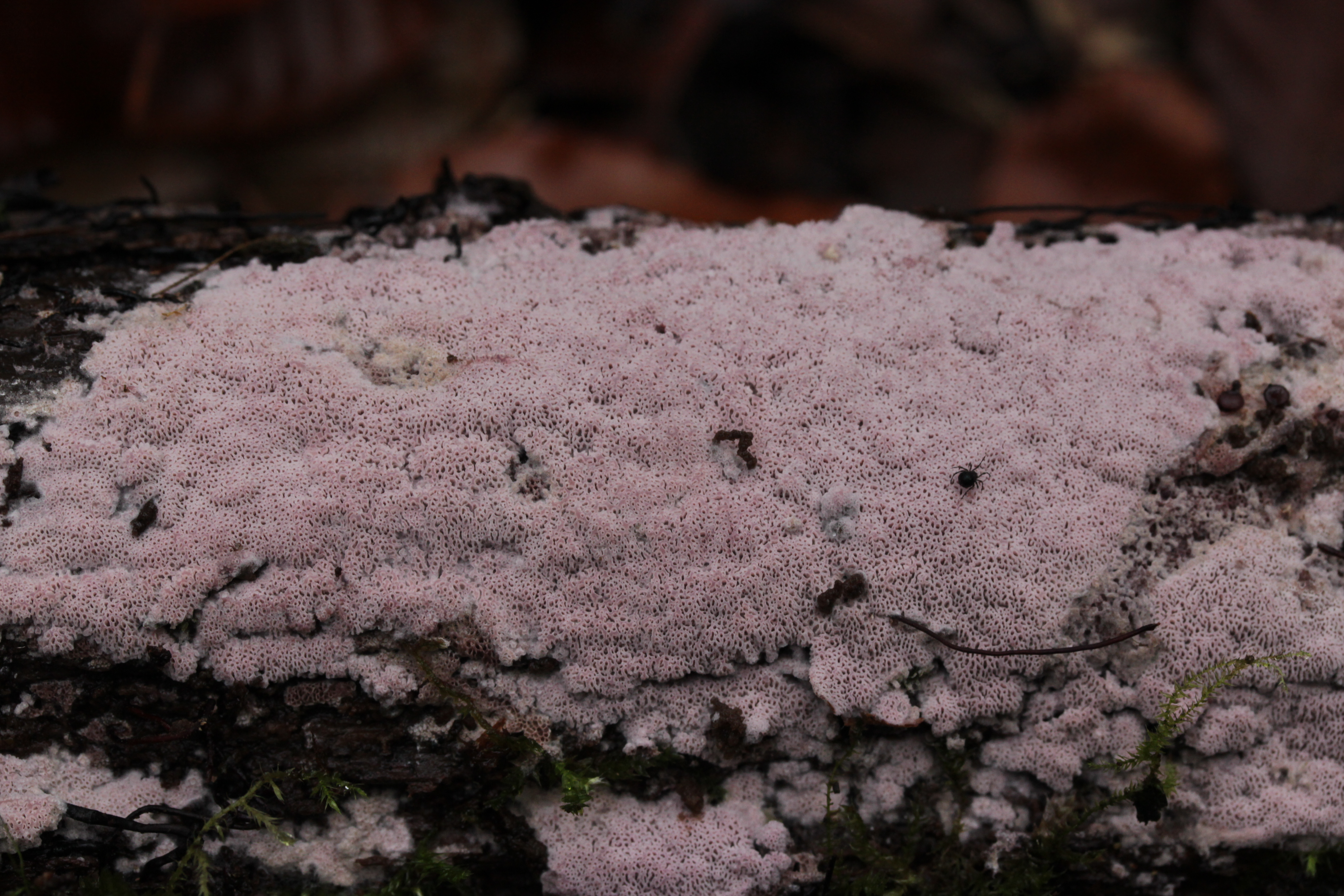

Scientific classification
- Domain: Eukaryota
- Kingdom: Fungi
- Division: Basidiomycota
- Class: Agaricomycetes
- Order: Polyporales
- Family: Irpicaceae
- Genus: Ceriporia
- Species: C. excelsa

Binomial name
- Ceriporia excelsa S.Lundell ex Parmasto (1959)

Synonyms
- Poria excelsa S.Lundell (1946); Gloeoporus excelsus S.Lundell ex Zmitr. & Spirin (2006)

= Ceriporia excelsa =

Species of fungus

Ceriporia excelsa is a species of crust fungus in the family Irpicaceae. It is found in Europe and North America, where it typically grows on dead hardwood. It has also been recorded from China.

== Description ==
The crust-like fruit bodies of this species are soft and readily separable from the substrate. The colour of the margin ranges from white to pinkish tan to purplish, while the pore surface is pink to reddish orange. Pores are circular or angular and number two to three per millimetre. C. excelsa has a monomitic hyphal system, with only generative hyphae. Spores are oblong to somewhat cylindrical, measuring 3.5–5 by 2–2.5 μm.
