= Gloeoporus africanus =

Scientific classification
- Domain: Eukaryota
- Kingdom: Fungi
- Division: Basidiomycota
- Class: Agaricomycetes
- Order: Polyporales
- Family: Irpicaceae
- Genus: Gloeoporus
- Species: G. africanus

Binomial name
- Gloeoporus africanus P.E.Jung & Y.W.Lim (2018)

Species of fungus

Gloeoporus africanus is a species of crust fungus in the family Irpicaceae. Found in Africa, it was described as a new species in 2018 by Paul Jung and Young Wood Lim. The type collection was made in Bwindi Impenetrable National Park, Uganda, where it was found growing on a fallen branch. It is somewhat similar in appearance to Bjerkandera adusta, but is distinguished from that fungus by its angular pores and the white edges of the actively growing pore surface. G. africanus has a monomitic hyphal system, and its generative hyphae have clamp connections. Its spores are sausage-shaped (allantoid), measuring 3.8–4.2 by 0.6–0.7 μm.
