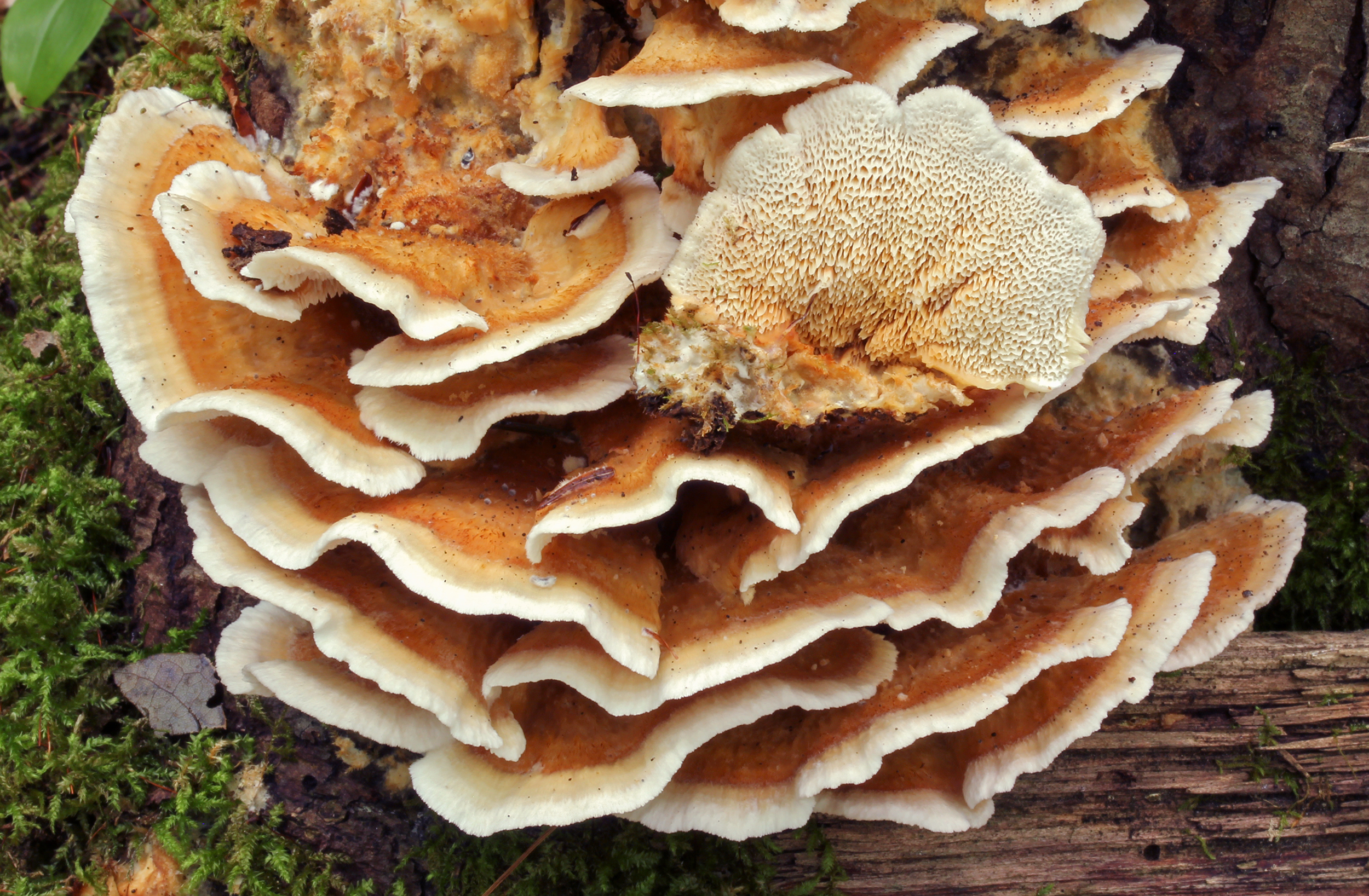
- Trametopsis cervina

Scientific classification
- Domain: Eukaryota
- Kingdom: Fungi
- Division: Basidiomycota
- Class: Agaricomycetes
- Order: Polyporales
- Family: Irpicaceae
- Genus: Trametopsis; Tomšovský (2008)

Type species
- Trametopsis cervina (Schwein.) Tomšovský (2008)

Synonyms
- Davidia M.Pieri & B.Rivoire (2008)

= Trametopsis =

Genus of fungi

Trametopsis is a genus of fungi in the family Irpicaceae.

== Species ==
The following species are recognised in the genus Trametopsis:

- Trametopsis aborigena Gómez-Mont. & Robledo (2017)
- Trametopsis brasiliensis (Ryvarden & de Meijer) Gómez-Mont. & Robledo (2017)
- Trametopsis cervina (Schwein.) Tomšovský (2008)
