= Efibula =

Scientific classification
- Kingdom: Fungi
- Division: Basidiomycota
- Class: Agaricomycetes
- Order: Polyporales
- Family: Irpicaceae
- Genus: Efibula; Sheng H.Wu (1990)

Type species
- Efibula tropica Sheng H.Wu (1990)

Genus of fungi

Efibula is a genus of 16 species of crust fungi in the family Irpicaceae.

== Taxonomy ==
The genus was circumscribed by Sheng-Hua Wu in 1990 with Efibula tropica as the type species. Efibula contains Phlebia-like fungi without clamp connections. Although traditionally classified in the family Phanerochaetaceae, recent molecular phylogenetic analysis supports the placement of Efibula in the Irpicaceae.

== Species ==
As of June 2018, Index Fungorum accepts 16 species in Efibula:

- Efibula americana Floudas & Hibbett (2015)
- Efibula aurata (Bourdot & Galzin) Zmitr. & Spirin (2006)
- Efibula avellanea (Bres.) Sheng H.Wu (1990)
- Efibula bubalina (Burds.) Zmitr. & Spirin (2006)
- Efibula clarkii Floudas & Hibbett (2015)
- Efibula cordylines (G.Cunn.) Zmitr. & Spirin (2006)
- Efibula corymbata (G.Cunn.) Zmitr. & Spirin (2006)
- Efibula deflectens (P.Karst.) Sheng H.Wu (1990)
- Efibula ginnsii (Sheng H.Wu) Zmitr. & Spirin (2006)
- Efibula gracilis Floudas & Hibbett (2015)
- Efibula lutea Sheng H.Wu (1990)
- Efibula pallidovirens (Bourdot & Galzin) Sheng H.Wu (1990)
- Efibula subodontoidea (Sheng H.Wu) Zmitr. & Spirin (2006)
- Efibula subquercina (Henn.) Zmitr. & Spirin (2006)
- Efibula tropica Sheng H.Wu (1990)
- Efibula tuberculata (P.Karst.) Zmitr. & Spirin (2006)
- Efibula verruculosa (Hjortstam & Ryvarden) Kotir. & Saaren. (1993)

The genus Roseograndinia was created in 2005 to contain the fungus once proposed for transfer into Efibula as Efibula rosea.
