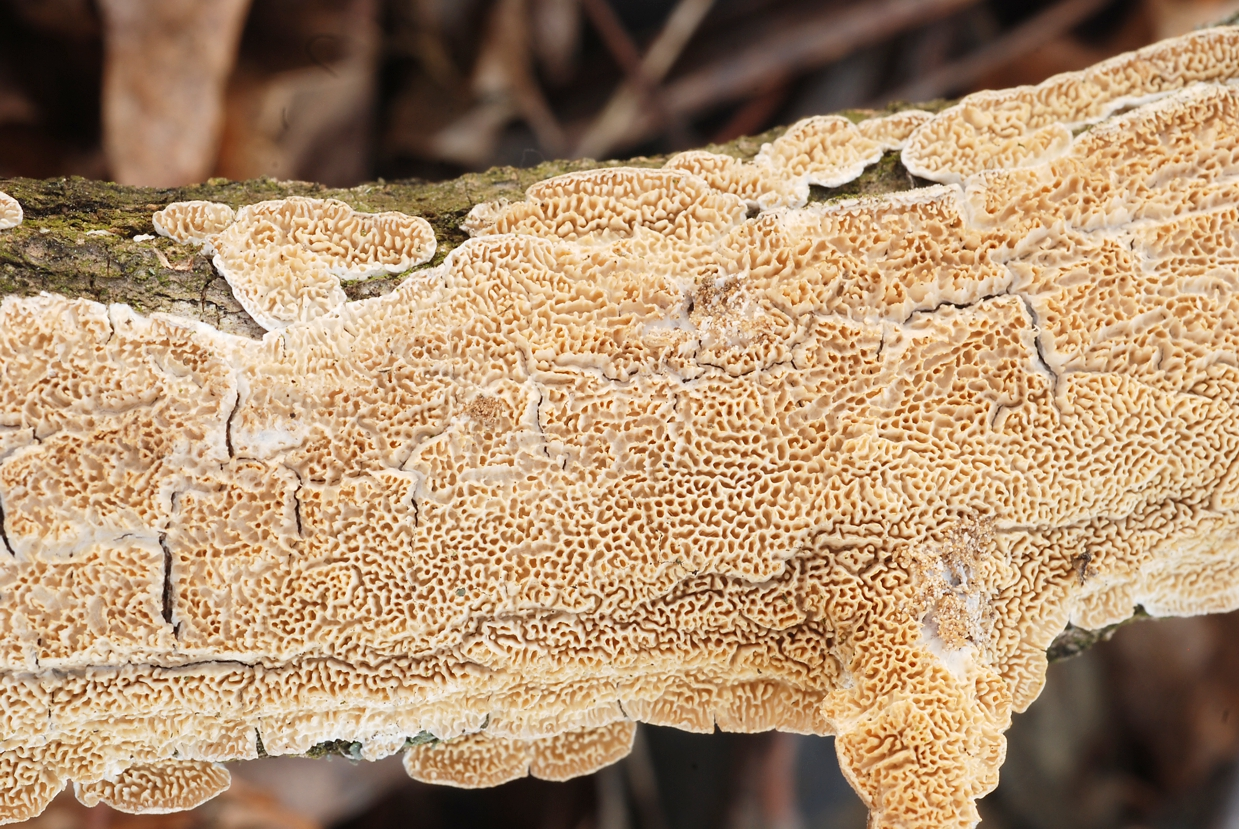
- Irpex lacteus

Scientific classification
- Domain: Eukaryota
- Kingdom: Fungi
- Division: Basidiomycota
- Class: Agaricomycetes
- Order: Polyporales
- Family: Irpicaceae
- Genus: Irpex; Fr. (1825)

Type species
- Irpex lacteus (Fr.) Fr. (1828)

Synonyms
- Flavodon Ryvarden (1973)

= Irpex =

Genus of fungi

Irpex is a genus of corticioid fungi in the order Polyporales. Species produce fruit bodies that grow as a crust on the surface of dead hardwoods. The crust features an irpicioid spore-bearing surface (for which the genus is named), meaning it has irregular and flattened teeth. Irpex is distinguished from the similar genera Junghuhnia and Steccherinum by the simple septa found in the generative hyphae.

== Classification ==
Although Irpex has been classified in the family Steccherinaceae, or the Meruliaceae, phylogenetic analysis has shown that its type species, Irpex lacteus, is more closely related to Byssomerulius in the Phanerochaetaceae. Justo and colleagues support a 2003 proposal that places Irpex as the type genus of family Irpicaceae.

== Species ==
- Irpex africanus Van der Byl (1934) – South Africa
- Irpex alboluteus Rick (1959) – Brazil
- Irpex aridus (Svrcek) Kotir. & Saaren. (2002)
- Irpex castaneus Lloyd (1920)
- Irpex conchiformis (Sacc.) Kotir. & Saaren. (2002)
- Irpex consors Berk. (1878)
- Irpex cremicolor Miettinen, Niemelä & Ryvarden (2007) – North Europe
- Irpex destruens Petch (1909)
- Irpex epitephrus Cleland (1936)
- Irpex gracillimus Pilát (1925)
- Irpex hacksungii J.S.Lee & Y.W.Lim (2009) – Korea
- Irpex holoporus (Pers.) Sacc. & Traverso (1910)
- Irpex hydnoides Y.W.Lim & H.S.Jung (2003)
- Irpex irpicinus (Berk. & Broome) D.A.Reid (1963) – Australia
- Irpex iyoensis Yasuda (1917)
- Irpex javensis Lloyd (1925)
- Irpex kusanoi Henn. & Shirai (1900)
- Irpex lacteus (Fr.) Fr. ( 1828)
- Irpex lamelliformis Lloyd (1917)
- Irpex lepidocarpus (P.Karst.) Sacc. & Trotter (1912)
- Irpex litschaueri (Bourdot & Galzin) Kotir. & Saaren. (2002)
- Irpex longisporus Rick (1959) – Brazil
- Irpex longus Rick (1959) – Brazil
- Irpex merulioides (Berk. & Broome) Lloyd (1914)
- Irpex microdon Rick (1959) – Brazil
- Irpex mikhnoi (P.Karst.) Sacc. & Trotter (1912)
- Irpex miyabei Lloyd (1923)
- Irpex mukhinii (Kotir. & Y.C.Dai) Kotir. & Saaren. (2002)
- Irpex narymicus (Pilát) Saaren. & Kotir. (2002)
- Irpex noharae (Murrill) Sacc. & Trotter (1912)
- Irpex ochrosimilis Lloyd (1924)
- Irpex owensii Lloyd (1916)
- Irpex pallidus Lloyd (1920)
- Irpex palmatus (Berk.) Speg. (1959) – Rio de Janeiro
- Irpex poria Rick (1959) – Brazil
- Irpex rickii Lloyd (1925)
- Irpex roseotingens (Hjortstam & Ryvarden) Saaren. & Kotir. (2002)
- Irpex sepiarius Lloyd (1917)
- Irpex subhypogaeus Rick (1932)
- Irpex subrawakensis (Murrill) Saaren. & Kotir. (2002)
- Irpex tasmanicus Syd. & P.Syd. (1903)
- Irpex tiliaceus Pilát (1925)
- Irpex tomentosocinctus Rick (1959) – Brazil
- Irpex unicolor Lloyd (1920)
- Irpex vagus (Burds. & Nakasone) Saaren. & Kotir. (2002)
- Irpex vellereus Berk. & Broome (1873) – Philippines
- Irpex versatilis Lloyd (1917)
- Irpex woronowii Bres. (1920)
