= Metuloidea cinnamomea =

Scientific classification
- Domain: Eukaryota
- Kingdom: Fungi
- Division: Basidiomycota
- Class: Agaricomycetes
- Order: Polyporales
- Family: Steccherinaceae
- Genus: Metuloidea
- Species: M. cinnamomea

Binomial name
- Metuloidea cinnamomea (Iturr. & Ryvarden) Miettinen & Ryvarden (2016)

Synonyms
- Antrodiella cinnamomea Iturr. & Ryvarden (2010)

Species of fungus

Metuloidea cinnamomea is a species of tooth fungus in the family Steccherinaceae. Found in the Andes region of Venezuela, it was initially described in 2010 by Teresa Iturriaga and Leif Ryvarden as a species of Antrodiella. Otto Miettinen and Ryvarden transferred it to the newly created genus Metuloidea in 2016.
