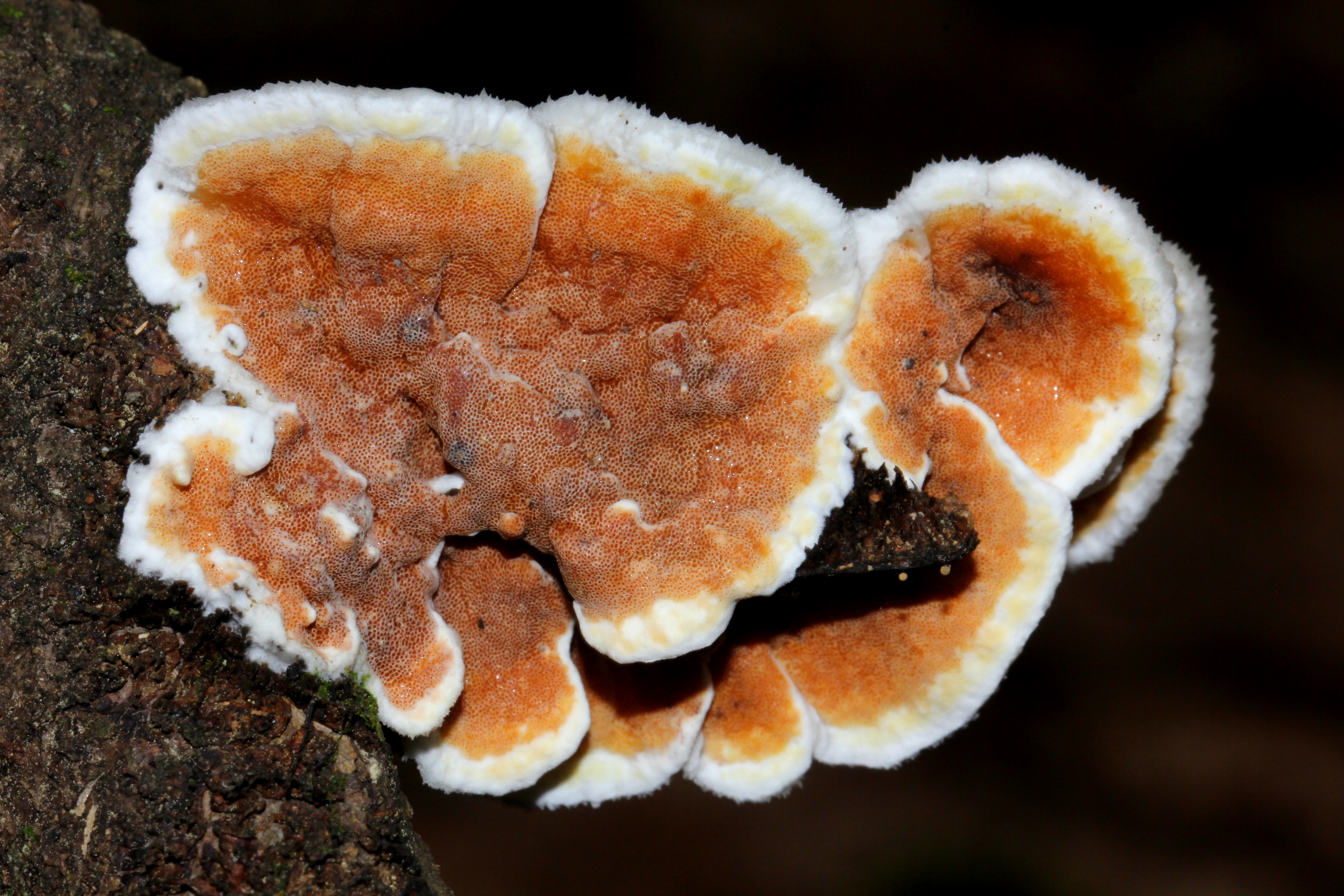

Scientific classification
- Domain: Eukaryota
- Kingdom: Fungi
- Division: Basidiomycota
- Class: Agaricomycetes
- Order: Polyporales
- Family: Irpicaceae
- Genus: Gloeoporus
- Species: G. dichrous

Binomial name
- Gloeoporus dichrous (Fr.) Bres. (1912)

Synonyms
- Polyporus dichrous Fr. (1815); Boletus dichrous (Fr.) Spreng. (1827); Bjerkandera dichroa (Fr.) P.Karst. (1880); Gloeoporus candidus Speg. (1880); Leptoporus dichrous (Fr.) Quél. (1888); Polystictus dichrous (Fr.) Gillot & Lucand (1890); Stereum dichroides Lloyd (1924); Poria subviridis Rick (1937); Caloporus dichrous (Fr.) Ryvarden (1976)

= Gloeoporus dichrous =

Species of fungus

Gloeoporus dichrous is a species of fungus in the family Irpicaceae. First described as Polyporus dichrous by Elias Magnus Fries in 1815, it was later transferred to the genus Gloeoporus by Italian mycologist Giacomo Bresadola in 1912. The variety G. dichrous var. niger (formerly known as Ceriporiopsis nigra) was proposed in 2008, after molecular analysis revealed the two taxa were conspecific. G. dichrous is inedible.
