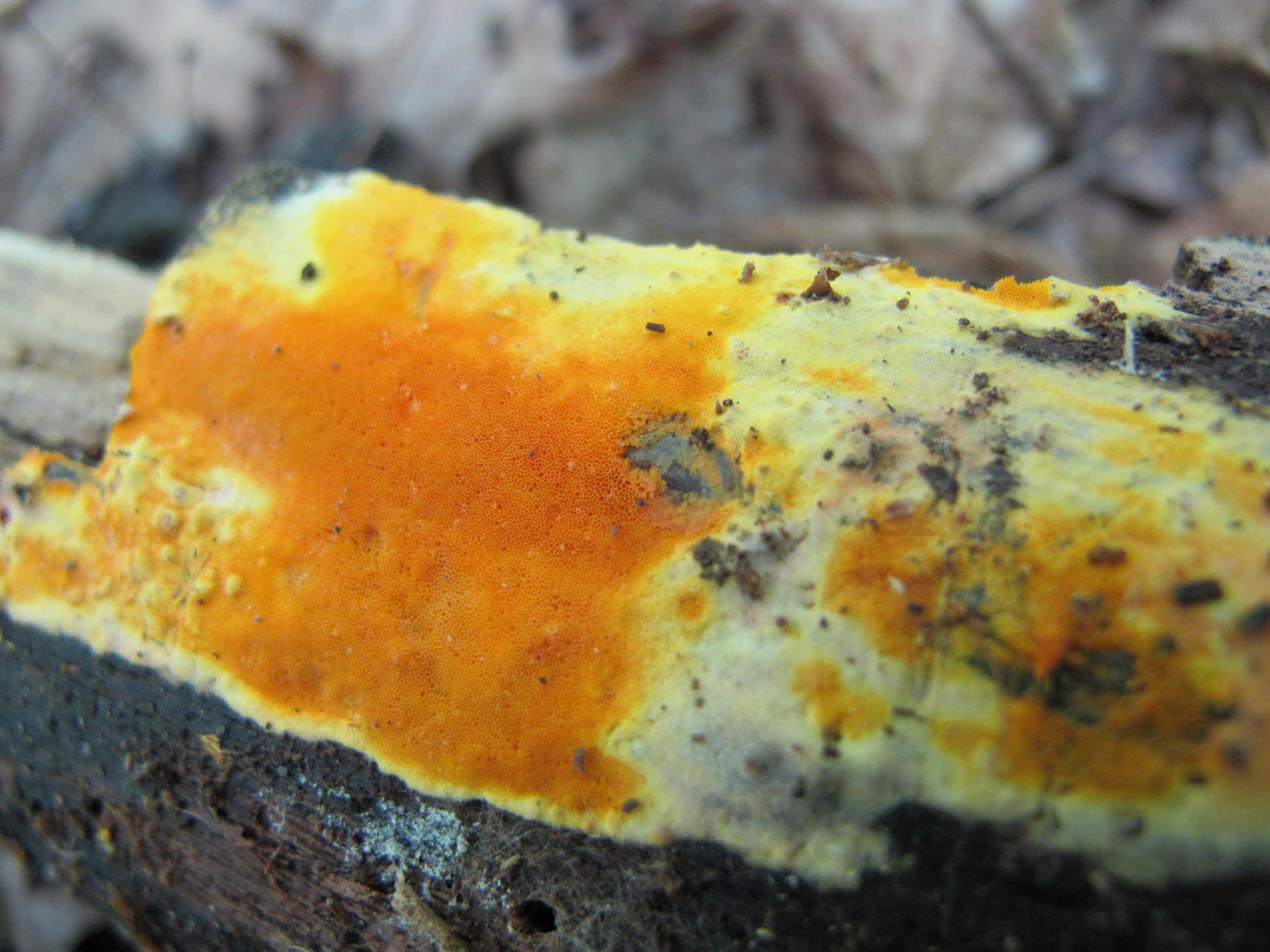
- Ceriporia spissa

Scientific classification
- Kingdom: Fungi
- Division: Basidiomycota
- Class: Agaricomycetes
- Order: Polyporales
- Family: Irpicaceae
- Genus: Ceriporia; Donk (1933)

Type species
- Ceriporia viridans (Berk. & Broome) Donk (1933)

Species
- 49; see text

Synonyms
- Ceraporus Bondartsev & Singer (1941); Riopa D.A.Reid (1969)

= Ceriporia =

Genus of fungi

Ceriporia is a widely distributed genus of crust fungi. Although traditionally classified in the family Phanerochaetaceae, recent molecular phylogenetic analysis supports the placement of Ceriporia in the Irpicaceae.

Adults of the pleasing fungus beetle Aporotritoma pulchra have been recorded from an undetermined "Ceriporia", which may or may not be placed in that genus today.

== Taxonomy ==
The genus was circumscribed by Dutch mycologist Marinus Anton Donk in 1930, with Ceriporia viridans as the type species. The generic name combines the Latin word cera ("wax") and the name Poria.

Molecular phylogenetic analyses have shown that Ceriporia is not monophyletic, despite an earlier study which suggested the contrary. The presence or absence of cystidia is not considered a phylogenetic character in delimiting the species of Ceriporia.

== Species ==
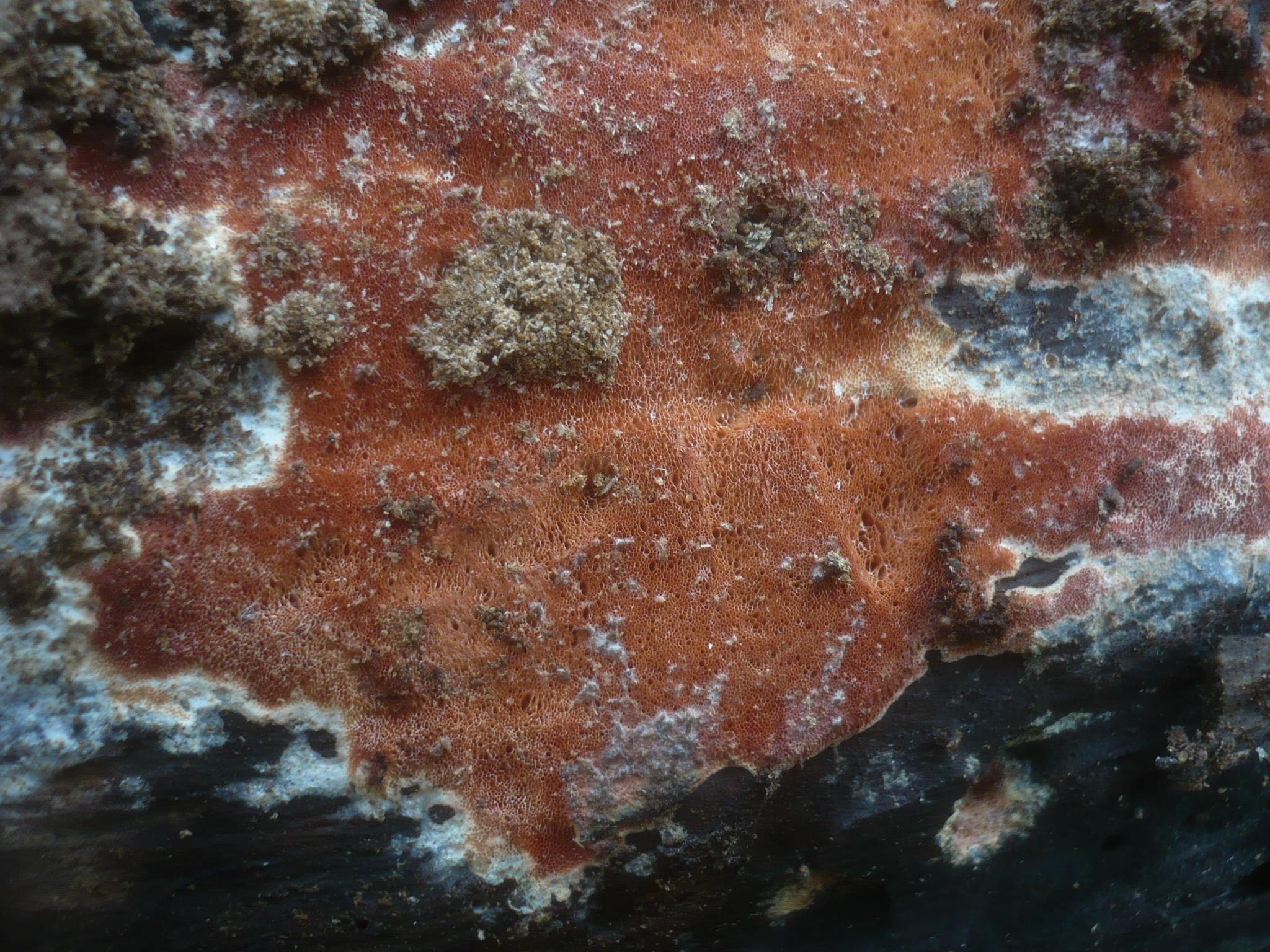
Ceriporia purpurea

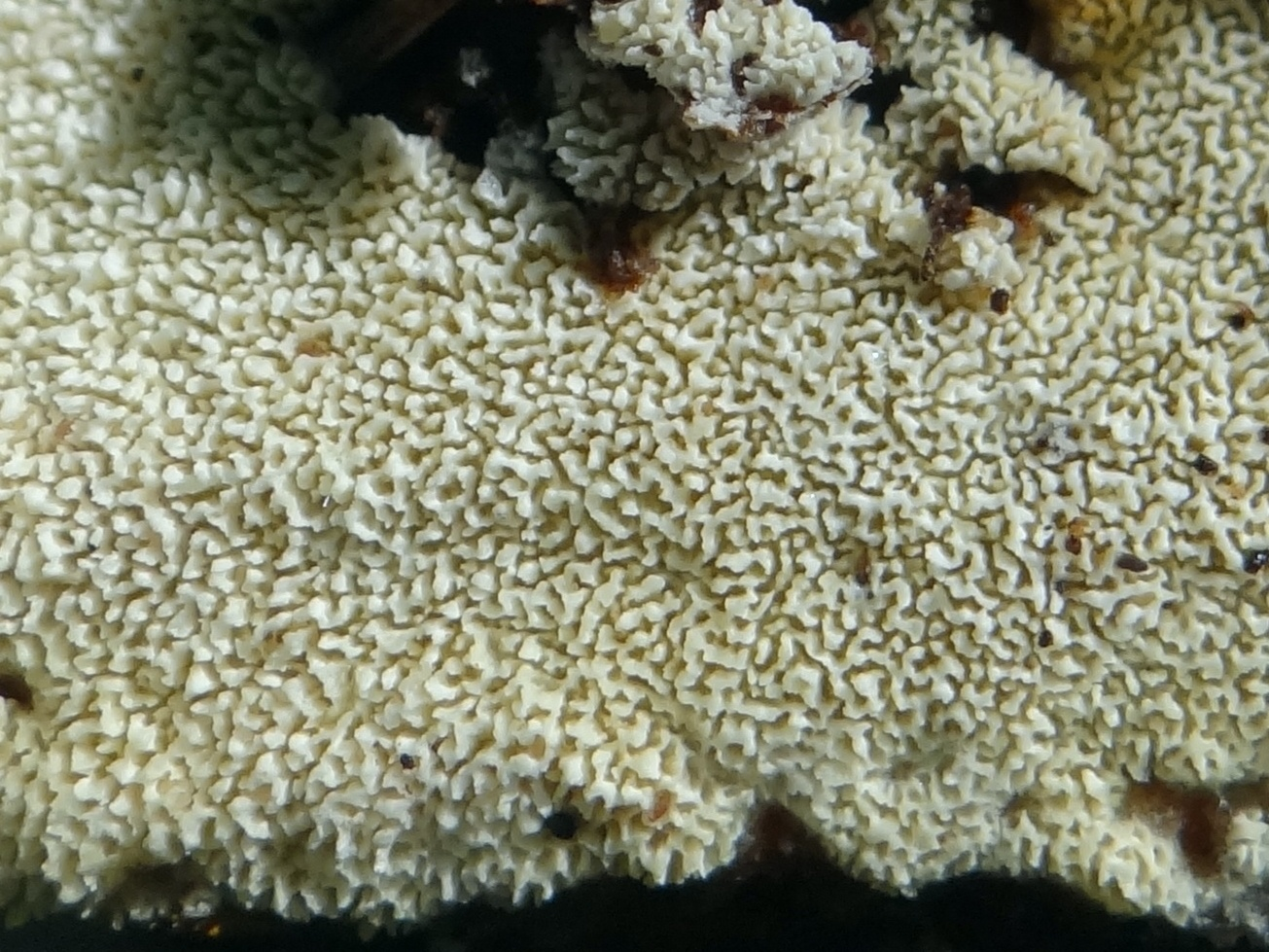
Ceriporia reticulata

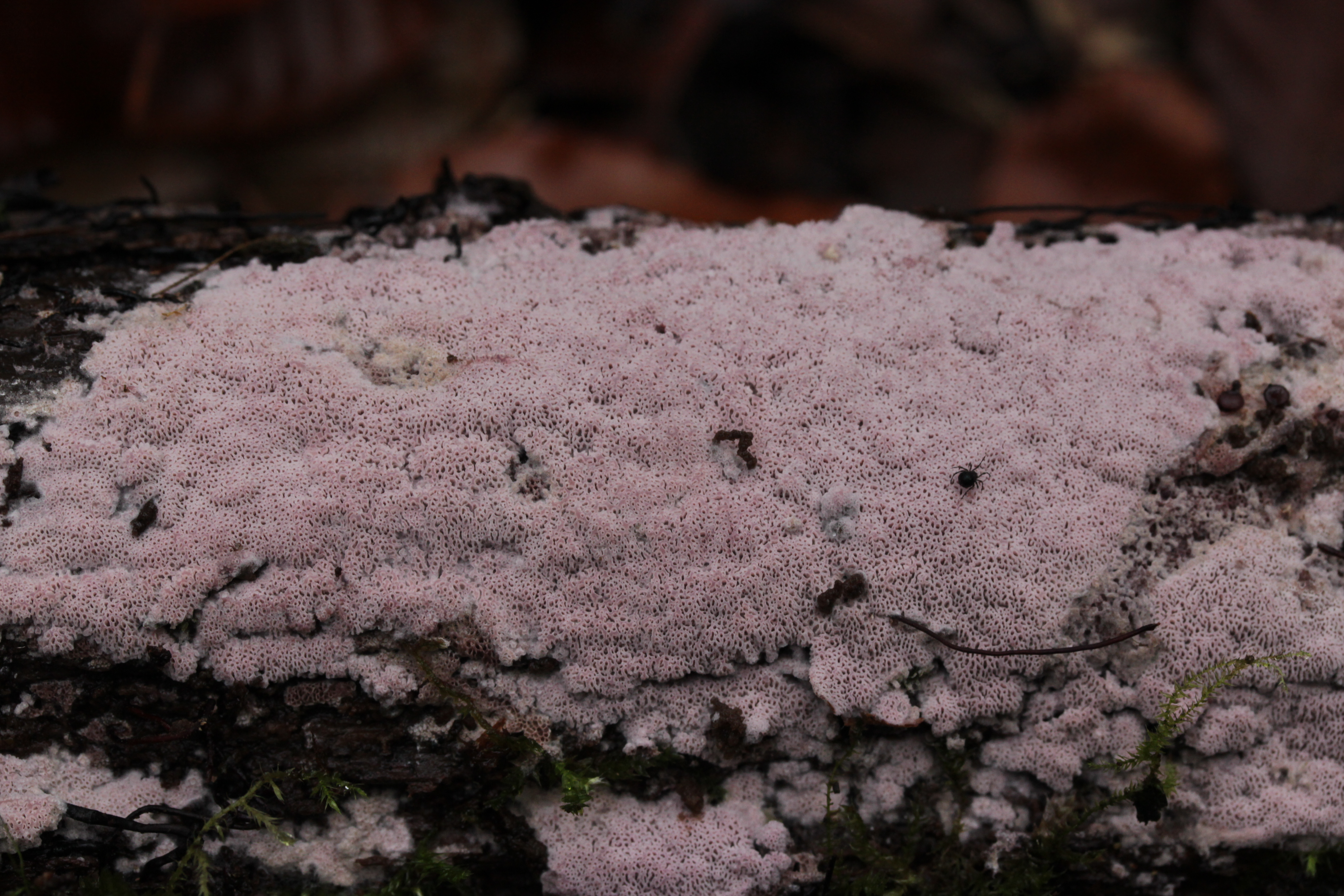
Ceriporia excelsa

A 2008 estimate placed 22 species in the genus. As of September 2016, Index Fungorum accepts 49 species of Ceriporia. Twenty species occur in China; eighteen species are found in the neotropics.

- Ceriporia alachuana (Murrill) Hallenb. (1979) – Dominican Republic
- Ceriporia alania Gilb. & Hemmes (2004)
- Ceriporia alba M.Pieri & B.Rivoire (1997)
- Ceriporia albobrunnea Ryvarden & Iturr. (2003)
- Ceriporia albomellea Yuan Yuan, Jia J.Chen, X.H.Ji (2017) – China
- Ceriporia amazonica A.M.S.Soares, H.M.P.Sotão & Ryvarden (2014) – Brazil
- Ceriporia angulata Gomes-Silva, Ryvarden & Gibertoni (2012) – Brazil
- Ceriporia aurantiocarnescens (Henn.) M.Pieri & B.Rivoire (1997)
- Ceriporia aurea Ryvarden (2014) – Brazil
- Ceriporia bresadolae (Bourdot & Galzin) Donk (1933)
- Ceriporia bubalinomarginata B.S.Jia & Y.C.Dai (2013) – China
- Ceriporia camaresiana (Bourdot & Galzin) Bondartsev & Singer (1941) – Corsica
- Ceriporia citrina M.Mata & Ryvarden (2010) – Costa Rica
- Ceriporia crassitunicata Y.C.Dai & Sheng H.Wu (2002)
- Ceriporia cystidiata Ryvarden & Iturr. (2003)
- Ceriporia davidii (D.A.Reid) M.Pieri & B.Rivoire (1997)
- Ceriporia dentipora Ryvarden (2010) – Costa Rica
- Ceriporia excelsa S.Lundell ex Parmasto (1959) – Europe
- Ceriporia ferrugineocincta (Murrill) Ryvarden (1980) – Puerto Rico
- Ceriporia griseoviolascens M.Pieri & B.Rivoire (1997)
- Ceriporia herinkii Vampola (1996) – Europe
- Ceriporia incrustata M.Mata & Ryvarden (2010) – Costa Rica
- Ceriporia inflata B.S.Jia & B.K.Cui (2012) – China
- Ceriporia jiangxiensis B.S.Jia & B.K.Cui (2012) – China
- Ceriporia lacerata N.Maek., Suhara & R.Kondo (2003)
- Ceriporia leptoderma (Berk. & Broome) Ryvarden (1980) – Uganda
- Ceriporia mellea (Berk. & Broome) Ryvarden (1978) – Uganda; Zaïre
- Ceriporia mellita (Bourdot & Galzin) Bondartsev & Singer (1941) – Great Britain
- Ceriporia merulioidea Ryvarden (2010)
- Ceriporia metamorphosa (Fuckel) Ryvarden & Gilb. (1993) – Europe
- Ceriporia microspora I.Lindblad & Ryvarden (1999)
- Ceriporia nanlingensis B.K.Cui & B.S.Jia (2011) – China
- Ceriporia ochracea Ryvarden (2014)
- Ceriporia otakou (G.Cunn.) P.K.Buchanan & Ryvarden (1988)
- Ceriporia pseudocystidiata B.S.Jia & Y.C.Dai (2013) – China
- Ceriporia purpurea (Fr.) Donk (1971) – Europe
- Ceriporia retamoana Rajchenb. (2000)
- Ceriporia reticulata (Hoffm.) Domanski (1963) – Europe; United States
- Ceriporia rhodella (Fr.) Donk (1933)
- Ceriporia rubescens (Petch) Ryvarden (2015)
- Ceriporia spissa (Schwein. ex Fr.) Rajchenb. (1983) – Great Britain
- Ceriporia straminea Ryvarden (2014)
- Ceriporia subpudorina (Pilát) Bondartsev (1953)
- Ceriporia subspissa Aime & Ryvarden (2007) – Guyana
- Ceriporia tarda (Berk.) Ginns (1984) – United States; Australia
- Ceriporia totara (G.Cunn.) P.K.Buchanan & Ryvarden (1988)
- Ceriporia variegata B.S.Jia & Y.C.Dai (2013) – China
- Ceriporia vermicularis M.Pieri & B.Rivoire (1997)
- Ceriporia viridans (Berk. & Broome) Donk (1933) – Europe
- Ceriporia xylostromatoides (Berk.) Ryvarden (1980)
