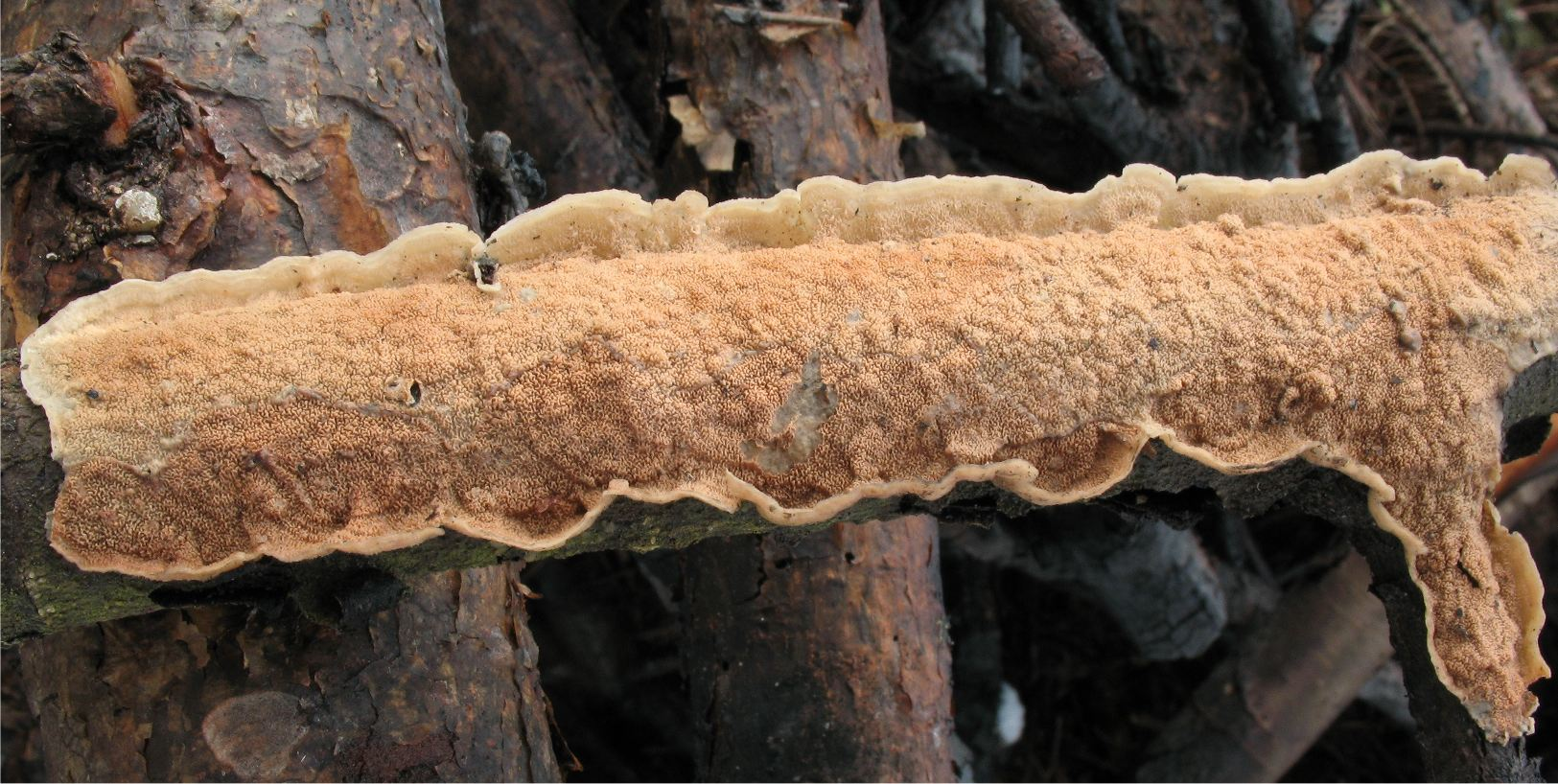

Scientific classification
- Domain: Eukaryota
- Kingdom: Fungi
- Division: Basidiomycota
- Class: Agaricomycetes
- Order: Polyporales
- Family: Irpicaceae
- Genus: Byssomerulius
- Species: B. corium

Binomial name
- Byssomerulius corium (Pers.) Parmasto (1967)

Synonyms
- Thelephora corium Pers. (1801)

= Byssomerulius corium =

Species of fungus

Byssomerulius corium is a common species of crust fungus in the family Irpicaceae. The fungus was first described as Thelephora corium by Christiaan Hendrik Persoon in 1801. Erast Parmasto made it the type species of his newly circumscribed genus Byssomerulius in 1967.

== Distribution ==
Byssomerulius corium is a highly distributed fungus, and has been recorded in Africa, Asia, Australia, Europe, and in South, Central, and North America.
