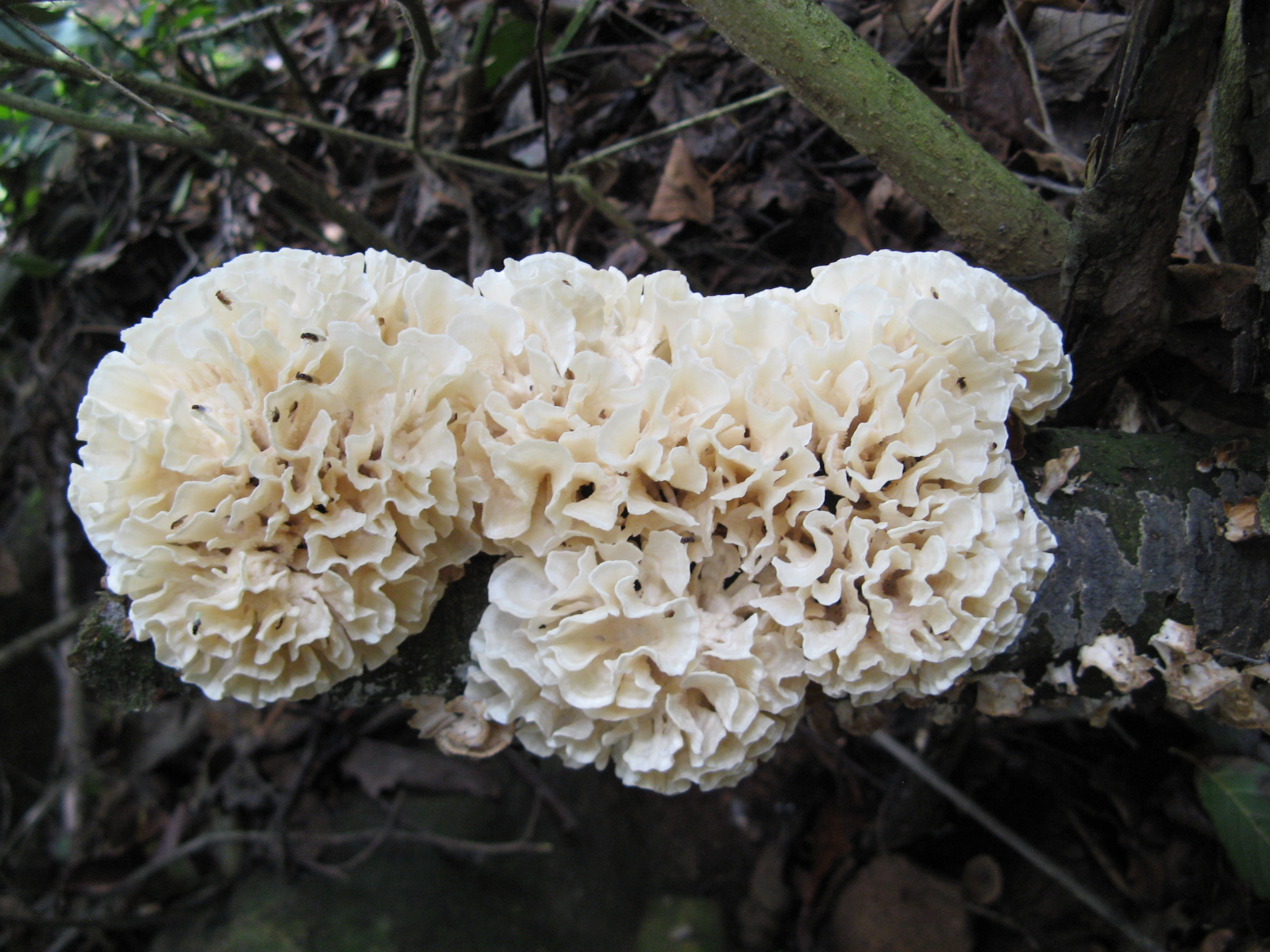
- Hydnopolyporus palmatus

Scientific classification
- Domain: Eukaryota
- Kingdom: Fungi
- Division: Basidiomycota
- Class: Agaricomycetes
- Order: Polyporales
- Family: Irpicaceae
- Genus: Hydnopolyporus; D.A.Reid (1962)

Type species
- Hydnopolyporus fimbriatus (Fr.) D.A.Reid (1962)

Species
- H. fimbriatus H. palmatus

= Hydnopolyporus =

Genus of fungi

Hydnopolyporus is a genus of two species of fungi. The genus was circumscribed in 1962 by English mycologist Derek Reid with H. fimbriatus as the type species.

Although traditionally classified in the family Meripilaceae, recent molecular phylogenetic analysis supports the placement of Hydnopolyporus in the Irpicaceae.
