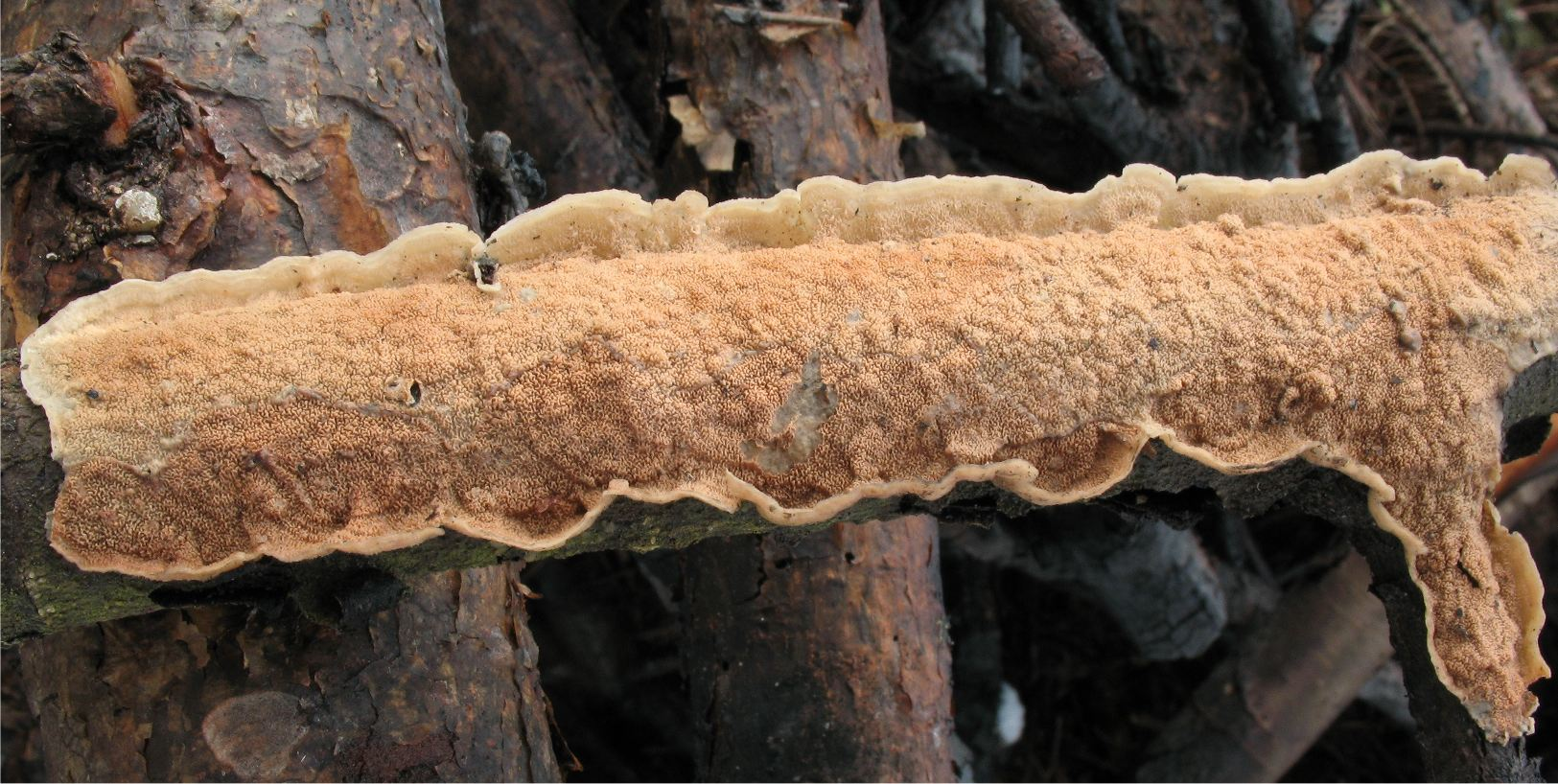
- Byssomerulius corium from Sweden

Scientific classification
- Kingdom: Fungi
- Division: Basidiomycota
- Class: Agaricomycetes
- Order: Polyporales
- Family: Irpicaceae
- Genus: Byssomerulius; Parmasto (1967)

Type species
- Byssomerulius corium (Pers.) Parmasto (1967)

Synonyms
- Byssomerulius subgen. Ceraceomerulius Parmasto (1968); Ceraceomerulius (Parmasto) J.Erikss. & Ryvarden (1973)

= Byssomerulius =

Genus of fungi

Byssomerulius is a widely distributed genus of crust fungi.

== Taxonomy ==
Byssomerulius was circumscribed by Estonian mycologist Erast Parmasto in 1967. Although traditionally classified in the family Phanerochaetaceae, recent molecular phylogenetic analysis supports the placement of Byssomerulius in the Irpicaceae.

== Species ==
- Byssomerulius albostramineus (Torrend) Hjortstam (1987) – United States
- Byssomerulius armeniacus Parmasto (1967)
- Byssomerulius auratus (Bourdot & Galzin) Tura, Zmitr., Wasser & Spirin (2011)
- Byssomerulius corium (Pers.) Parmasto (1967) – widespread
- Byssomerulius flavidoalbus (Corner) Hjortstam (1995)
- Byssomerulius hirtellus (Burt) Parmasto (1967) – Europe
- Byssomerulius incarnatus (Schwein.) Gilb. (1974) – Bolivia
- Byssomerulius pavonius (Sw.) Zmitr. & Malysheva (2006) – Brazil
- Byssomerulius pirottae (Bres.) Hjortstam (1987)
- Byssomerulius psittacinus P.K. Buchanan, Ryvarden & Izawa (2000) – New Zealand
- Byssomerulius rubicundus (Litsch.) Parmasto (1967) – Austria; Finland
- Byssomerulius salicinus Parmasto (1968)
