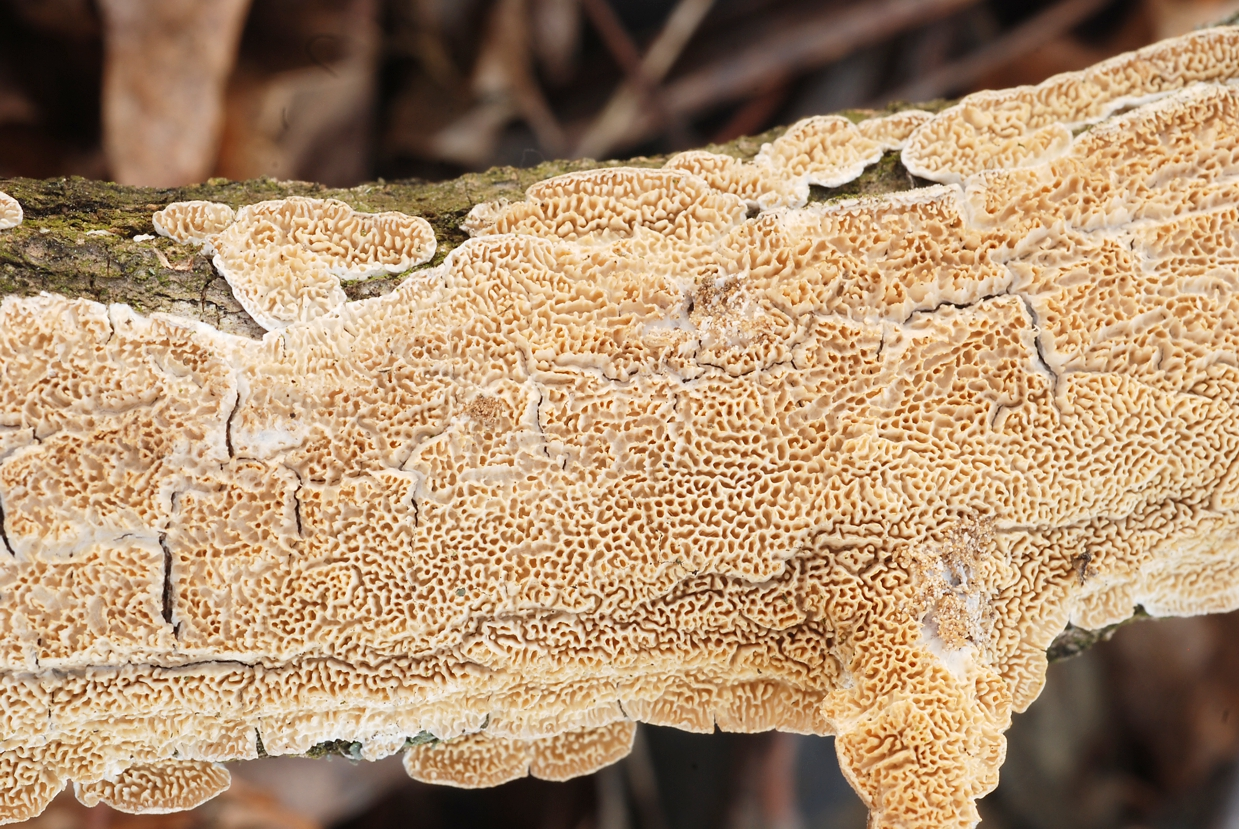

Scientific classification
- Kingdom: Fungi
- Division: Basidiomycota
- Class: Agaricomycetes
- Order: Polyporales
- Family: Irpicaceae
- Genus: Irpex
- Species: I. lacteus

Binomial name
- Irpex lacteus (Fr.) Fr. (1828)

= Irpex lacteus =

Irpex lacteus is a common crust fungus distributed throughout temperate areas of the world. It is the type of the genus Irpex. Irpex lacteus is considered a polypore, but depending on growth conditions it can also produce a hydnoid hymenophore. Due to this variability and abundance of the species it has been described as a new species to science numerous times and subsequently has an extensive synonymy. The complete genome sequence of Irpex lacteus was reported in 2017.

== Ecology ==
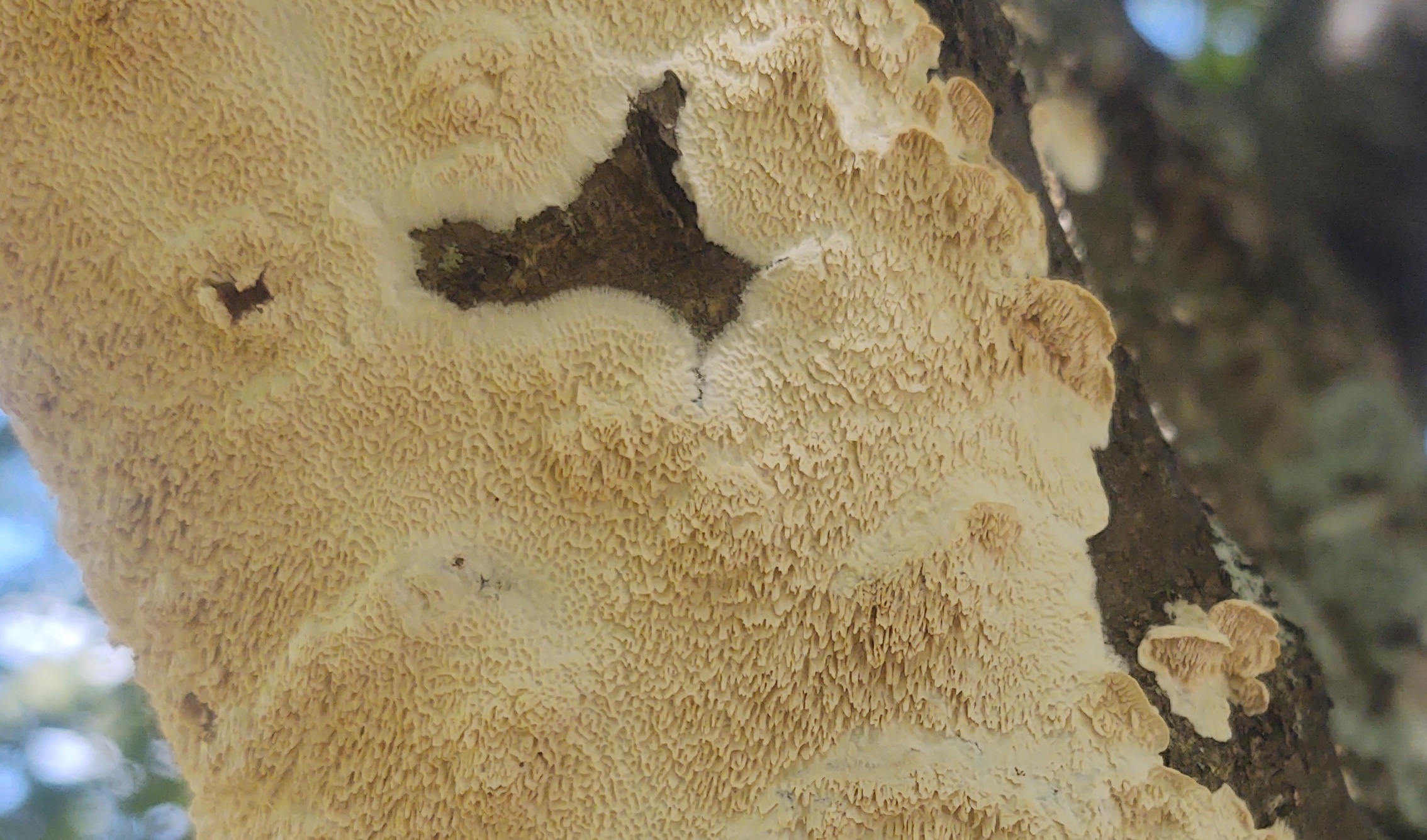
Infested, of possible Irpex lacteus growth on a deceased section of a cherry tree.

Irpex lacteus is a white-rot fungus that inhabits mainly angiosperm branches and trunks. It is one of the most common wood-rotting fungi for instance in urban North America. It is inedible. This fungus has been identified as a cause of pulmonary infections in immuno-compromised humans.

It is occasionally eaten by the widespread American pleasing fungus beetle Ischyrus quadripunctatus. Adults of the related beetle Tritoma biguttata biguttata are more rarely recorded from this mushroom, and it does not seem to be a regular food source for them.

== Taxonomy ==
The fungus was first described in 1818 by Elias Magnus Fries, who called it Sistotrema lacteum. Fries later made it the type species of the genus Irpex in 1828.

=== Synonyms ===
- Boletus cinerascens Schwein. (1822)
- Boletus tulipiferae Schwein. (1822)
- Coriolus lacteus (Fr.) Pat. (1900)
- Coriolus tulipiferae (Schwein.) Pat. (1900)
- Daedalea diabolica Speg. (1889)
- Hirschioporus lacteus (Fr.) Teng (1963)

Irpex lacteus
- Mycological characteristics
- Hymenium attachment is not applicable
- Lacks a stipe
- Ecology is saprotrophic
- Edibility is inedible

- Hydnum lacteum (Fr.) Fr. (1823)
- Irpex bresadolae Schulzer (1885)
- Irpex diabolicus (Speg.) Bres. (1919)
- Irpex hirsutus Kalchbr. (1878)
- Irpex lacteus f. sinuosus (Fr.) Nikol. (1953)
- Irpex pallescens Fr. (1838)
- Irpex sinuosus Fr. (1828)
- Irpiciporus lacteus (Fr.) Murrill (1907)
- Irpiciporus tulipiferae (Schwein.) Murrill (1905)
- Microporus chartaceus (Berk. & M.A.Curtis) Kuntze, (1898)
- Microporus cinerascens (Schwein.) Kuntze (1898)
- Polyporus chartaceus Berk. & M.A.Curtis (1849)
- Polyporus tulipiferae (Schwein.) Overh. [as 'tulipiferus'], (1915)
- Polystictus bresadolae (Schulzer) Sacc. (1888)
- Polystictus chartaceus (Berk. & M.A.Curtis) Cooke, (1886)
- Polystictus cinerascens (Schwein.) Cooke (1886)
- Polystictus cinerescens (Schwein.) Cooke
- Polystictus tulipiferae (Schwein.) Cooke (1886)
- Poria cincinnati Berk. ex Cooke, (1886)
- Poria tulipiferae (Schwein.) Cooke, (1888)
- Sistotrema lacteum Fr. (1818)
- Steccherinum lacteum (Fr.) Krieglst. (1999)
- Trametes lactea (Fr.) Pilát (1940)
- Xylodon bresadolae (Schulzer) Kuntze (1898)
- Xylodon hirsutus (Kalchbr.) Kuntze (1898)
- Xylodon lacteus (Fr.) Kuntze (1898)
- Xylodon pallescens (Fr.) Kuntze (1898)
- Xylodon sinuosus (Fr.) Kuntze (1898)
