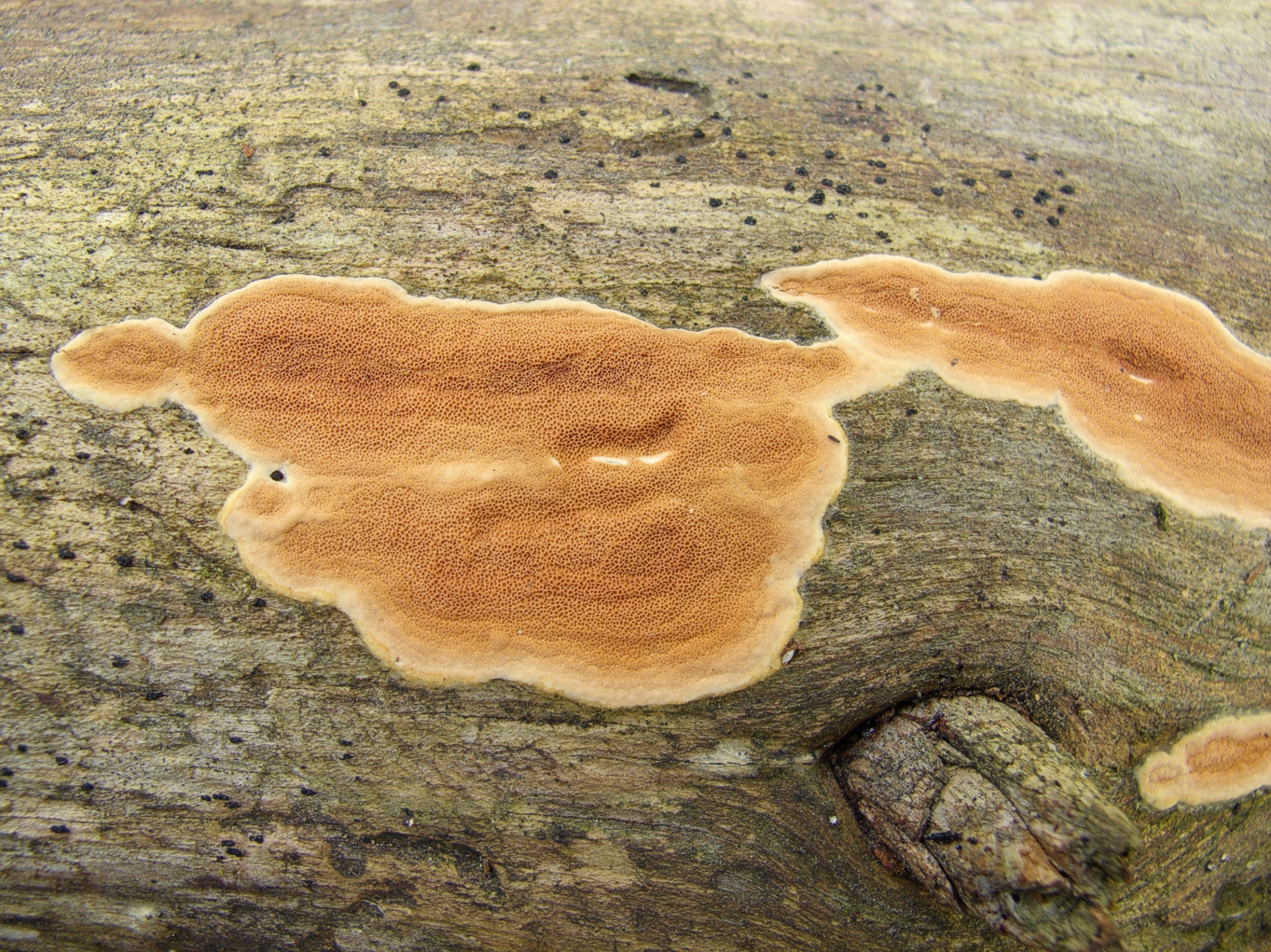
- Meruliopsis taxicola

Scientific classification
- Kingdom: Fungi
- Division: Basidiomycota
- Class: Agaricomycetes
- Order: Polyporales
- Family: Irpicaceae
- Genus: Meruliopsis; Bondartsev (1959)

Type species
- Meruliopsis taxicola (Pers.) Bondartsev (1959)

= Meruliopsis =

Genus of fungi

Meruliopsis is a genus of poroid crust fungi. The genus was circumscribed by Russian mycologist Appollinaris Semenovich Bondartsev in 1959.

Although traditionally classified in the family Phanerochaetaceae, recent molecular phylogenetic analysis supports the placement of Meruliopsis in the Irpicaceae.

== Species ==
- Meruliopsis bella (Berk. & M.A.Curtis) Ginns (1976)
- Meruliopsis cystidiata (Ryvarden) P.E.Jung & Y.W.Lim (2018)
- Meruliopsis miniata (Wakef.) Ginns (1976)
- Meruliopsis taxicola (Pers.) Bondartsev (1959)

A cystidium-forming species formerly placed in Gloeoporus (G. cystidiatus) was transferred to Meruliopsis in 2018 based on molecular phylogenetic analysis. The same study showed Gloeoporus guerreroanus to be the same species as M. cystidiata.
