= Edward Angus Burt =

American mycologist (1859–1939)

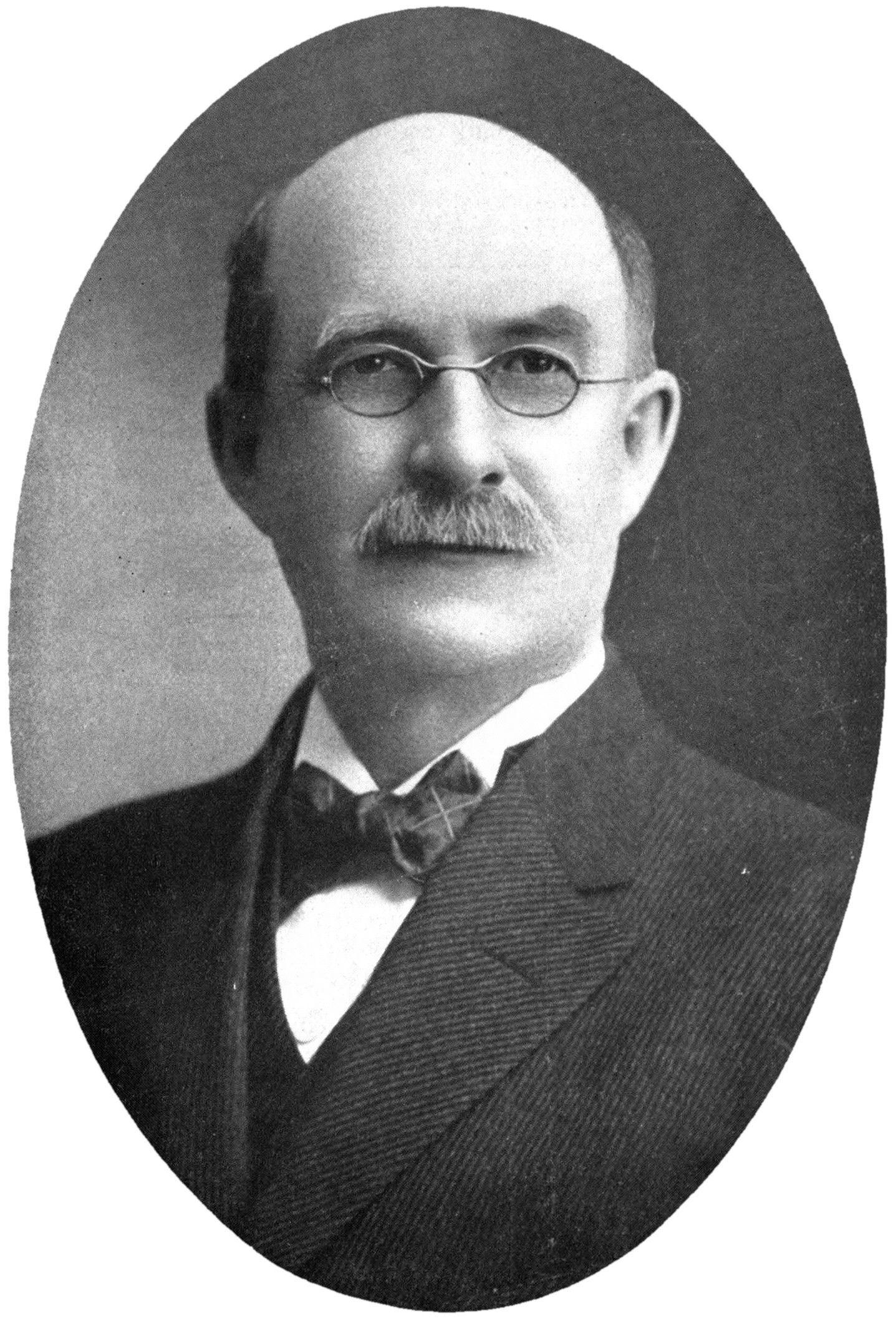
- Born: April 9, 1859; Athens, Pennsylvania, US
- Died: April 27, 1939 (aged 80); Saratoga Springs, New York, US

Edward Angus Burt (April 9, 1859 – April 27, 1939) was an American mycologist and an authority on the resupinate (flat on the substrate) fungus family Thelephoraceae.

== Biography ==
Edward Angus Burt was born in Athens, Pennsylvania on April 9, 1859. He received his M.A. in 1894 and PhD. in 1895, both from Harvard University under William G. Farlow and Roland Thaxter. He became a Professor of Natural History at Middlebury College in 1895, then both a Professor of Botany at the Henry Shaw School of Botany at Washington University in St. Louis, and a mycologist for the Missouri Botanical Garden in 1913. He also worked on a systematic description of basidiomycetes such as Merulius and fungi from Vermont, Siberia, and Java.

He died in Saratoga Springs, New York on April 27, 1939.

The Septobasidium species S. burtii is named in his honor.
