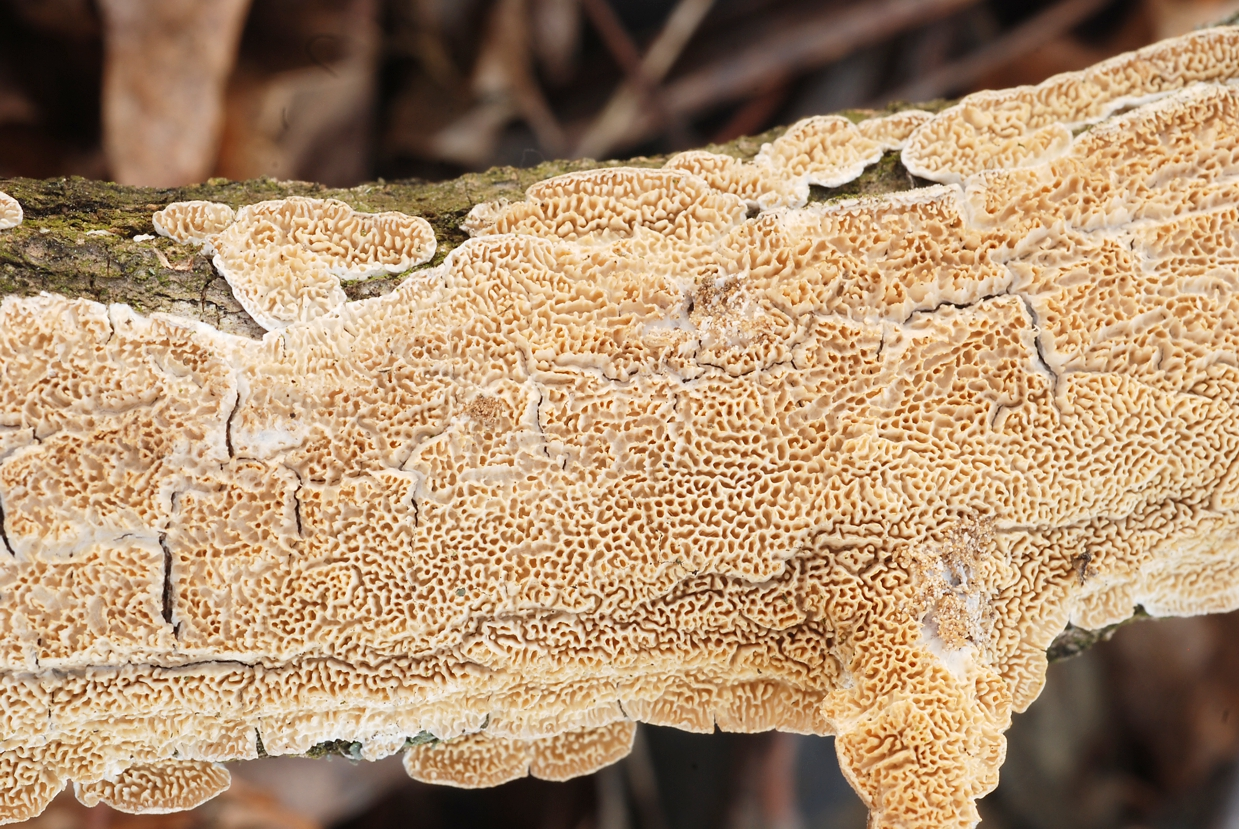
- Irpex lacteus

Scientific classification
- Kingdom: Fungi
- Division: Basidiomycota
- Class: Agaricomycetes
- Order: Polyporales
- Family: Irpicaceae; Spirin & Zmitr. (2003)

Type genus
- Irpex Fr. (1825)

= Irpicaceae =

Family of fungi

The Irpicaceae are a family of mostly polypores and crust fungi in the order Polyporales.

== Taxonomy ==
The family was circumscribed in 2003 by mycologists Viacheslav Spirin and Ivan Zmitrovich. The type genus is Irpex. Later multi-gene phylogenetic analyses of the Polyporales supported the use of this family. In these analyses, Irpicaceae is a sister taxon to the Meruliaceae; these two families, as well as the Phanerochaetaceae, form the phlebioid clade.

== Description ==
Irpicaceae has both polypore and crust fungi. They have a monomitic hyphal system, containing only generative hyphae that do not have clamp connections. Their spores are thin-walled, smooth, and translucent. Cystidia are often absent from the hymenium. More rarely, some species are dimitic and/or with cystidia and/or clamp-connections present; for example, Emmia and Irpex have cystidia, and there are clamp connections in Gloeoporus. Irpicaceae fungi produce a white-rot, except for one brown-rot genus (Leptoporus).

== Genera ==
- Byssomerulius Parmasto (1967) – 9 species
- Ceriporia Donk (1933) – 57 species
- Efibula Sheng H.Wu (1990) – 16 species
- Emmia Zmitr., Spirin & Malysheva (2006)
- Flavodon Ryvarden (1973) – 3 species
- Gloeoporus Mont. (1842) – 32 species
- Hydnopolyporus D.A.Reid (1962) – 2 species
- Leptoporus Quél. (1886) – 12 species
- Meruliopsis Bondartsev (1959) – 2 species
- Trametopsis Tomšovský (2008) – 3 species

According to Justo and colleagues, several genera from various other Polyporales families contain species that should be in the Irpicaceae, and will need to be reclassified. These include: Candelabrochaete (C. langloisii and C. septocystidia), Ceraceomyces (C. eludens, C. microsporus, and C. serpens), Ceriporia (C. lacerata), Ceriporiopsis (C. aneirina and C. resinascens), Hapalopilus (H. ochraceolateritius), Phanerochaete (P. allantospora, P. angustocystidiata, P. exilis, P. ginnsii, P. intertexta, P. leptoderma, and P. xerophila), and Phlebia (P. albida, P. albomellea, and P. nitidula.

Morphological variety of Irpicaceae
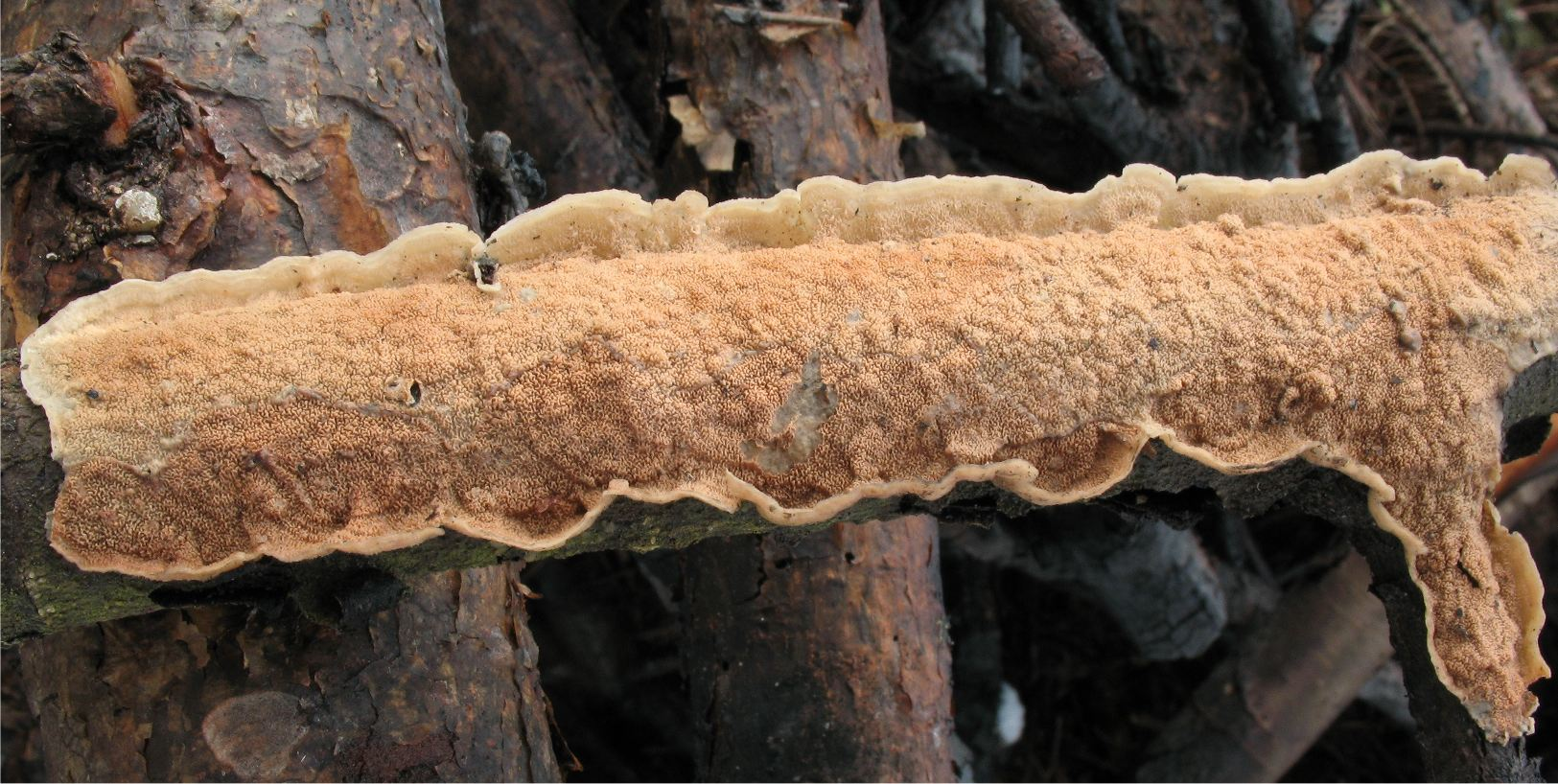
Corticioid: Byssomerulius corium

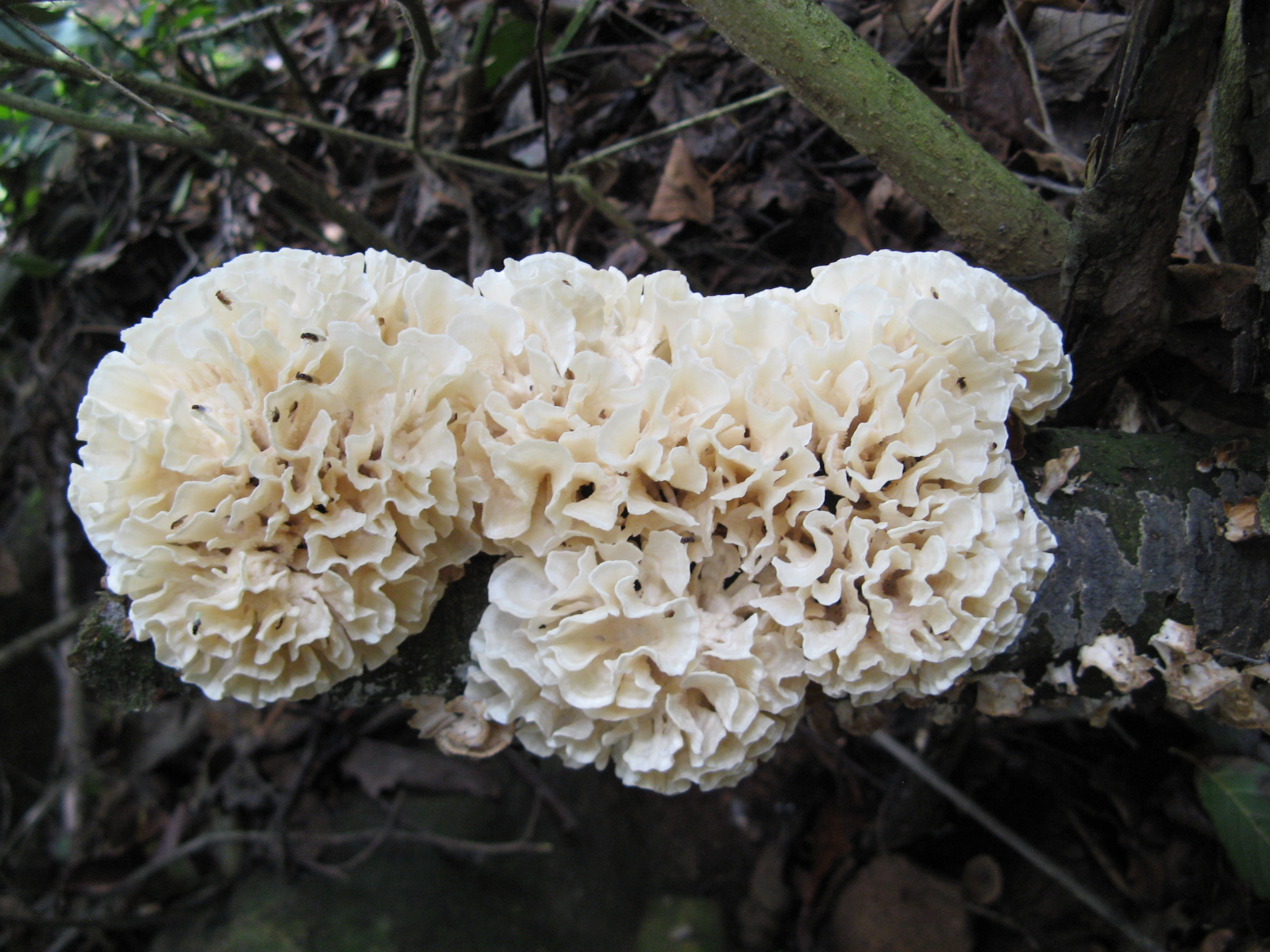
Flabelliform: Hydnopolyporus palmatus

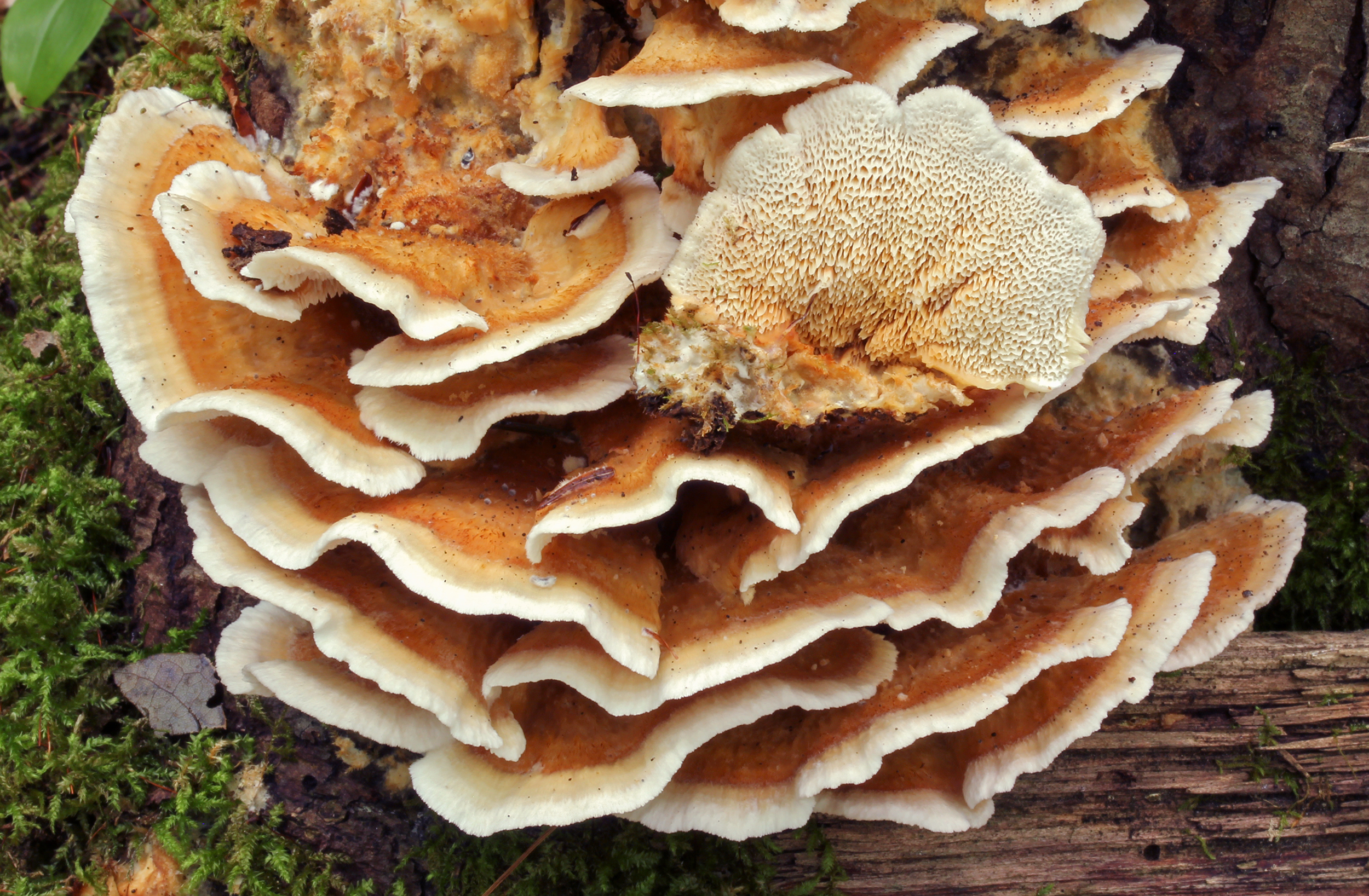
Polyporoid: Trametopsis cervina
