= List of Platanus diseases =

This article is a list of diseases of trees in the genus Platanus (plane trees, also known in North America as sycamores).

== Bacterial diseases ==
Bacterial diseases
| Bacterial wetwood | Bacterium (unidentified) |
| Leaf scorch | Xylella fastidiosa |

== Fungal diseases ==
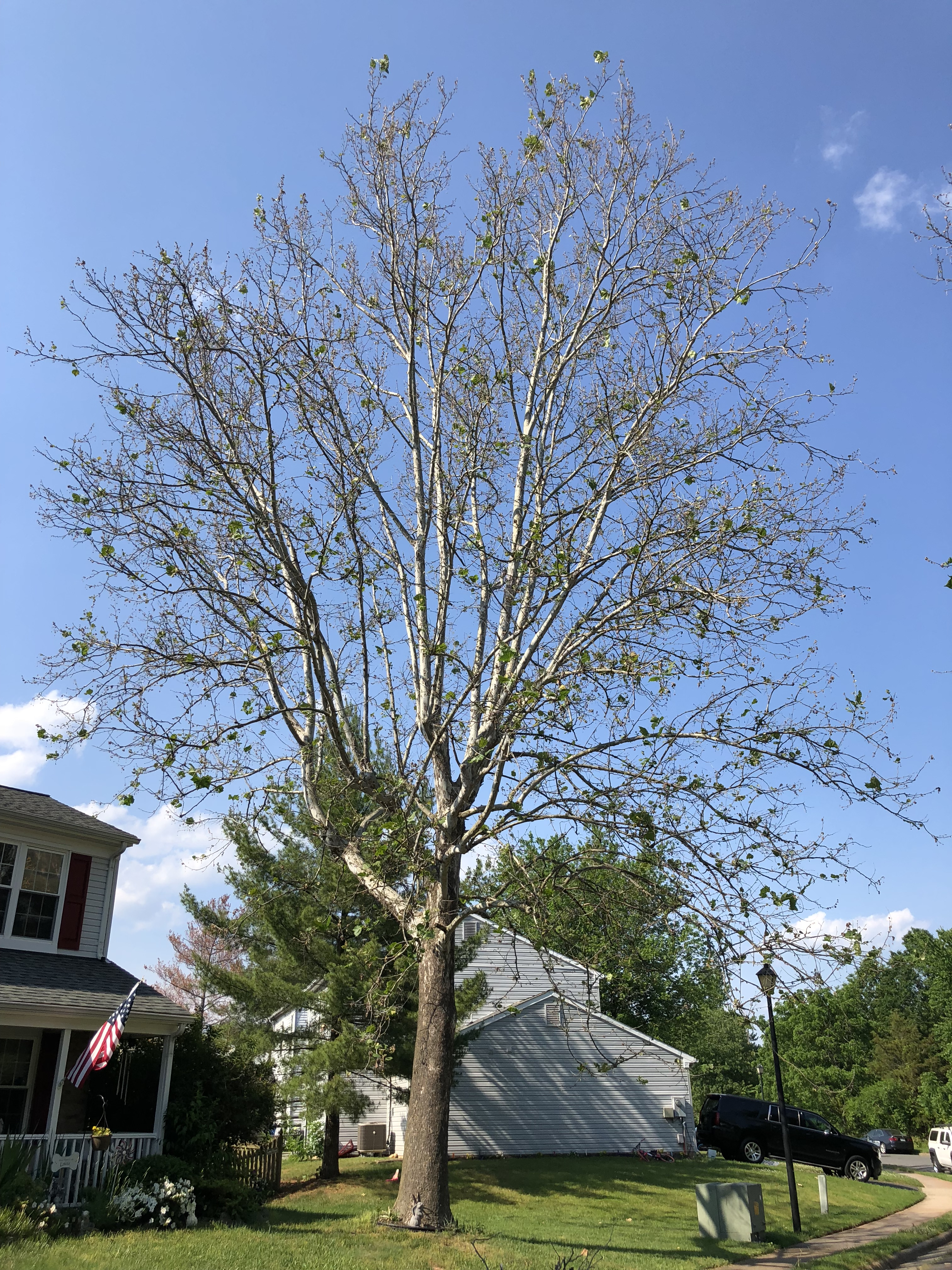
Severe infections of anthracnose can sometimes defoliate large swaths of sycamore during mid and late spring, but trees generally recover by mid-summer

Fungal diseases
| Anthracnose | Apiognomonia errabunda = Gnomonia errabunda Discula umbrinella [anamorph] Apiognomonia veneta Gnomonia veneta Discula platani [anamorph] |
| Armillaria root rot (shoestring root rot) | Armillaria mellea Rhizomorpha subcorticalis [anamorph] |
| Botryosphaeria canker - dieback | Botryosphaeria dothidea Fusicoccum aesculi [anamorph] Botryosphaeria obtusa Sphaeropsis sp. [anamorph] Botryosphaeria rhodina = Physalospora rhodina |
| Butt rot | Ganoderma applanatum = Fomes applanatus Ustulina deusta = Hypoxylon deustum |
| Ceratocystis canker | Ceratocystis fimbriata = Ceratostomella fimbriata Chlara sp. [anamorph] |
| Ceratocystis canker - stain | Ceratocystis platani =Ceratocystis fimbriata f. platani Endoconidiophora fimbriata f. platani |
| Cytospora canker | Cytospora platani |
| Eutypella canker | Eutypella parasitica Libertella sp. [anamorph] |
| Fusarium stem canker | Fusarium merismoides = Fusarium rimosum |
| Hypoxylon canker - dieback | Hypoxylon tinctor Xyloclodium sp. [anamorph] pathogenicity not proven |
| Leaf blight | Phloeospora multimaculans |
| Leaf spots | Mycosphaerella platanifolia Cercospora platanicola [anamorph] Cristulariella moricola = Cristulariella pyramidalis Fusicladium spp. Mycosphaerella platanifolia = Sphaerella platanifolia Mycosphaerella punctiformis = Sphaerella punctiformis Mycosphaerella stigmina-platani = Mycosphaerella polymorpha Phyllosticta platani Ramularia sp. Septoria platanifolia Stigmina platani = Stigmella platani Stigmella platani-racemosae = Stigmella platani-racemosae |
| Massaria canker - dieback | Splanchnonema platani = Massaria platani Macrodiplodiopsis desmazieresii [anamorph] |
| Nectria canker | Nectria sp. |
| Powdery mildew | Erysiphe platani Phyllactinia sp. (unknown) |
| Phomopsis canker | Phomopsis sp. Phomopsis scabra = Phoma scabra |
| Phymatotrichum root rot (Texas root rot) | Phymatotrichopsis omnivora = Phymatotrichum omnivorum |
| Phytophthora root rot | Phytophthora sp. |
| Pythium root rot | Pythium sp. |
| Seedling disease | Phytophthora cinnamomi Rhizoctonia solani |
| Sooty blotch | Gloeodes pomigena |
| Spot anthracnose | Sphaceloma sp. |
| Wood rots | Bjerkandera adusta Chondrostereum purpureum Daedaleopsis confragosa Datronia scutellata Fomes fasciatus Fomitopsis meliae Fomitopsis pinicola Fomitopsis spraguei Ganoderma applanatum Ganoderma lucidum Hericium erinaceus Hysizygus ulmarius Inonotus arizonicus Inonotus cuticularis Inonotus munzii Laxitextum bicolor Laxitextum sulcata Oxyporus latemarginatus Oxyporus populinus Phanerochaete allantospora Phanerochaete arizonica Phanerochaete avellanea Phanerochaete burtii Phanerochaete carnosa Phanerochaete chrysorhizon Phanerochaete crassa Phanerochaete filamentosa Phanerochaete omnivora Phanerochaete tuberculata Phellinus gilvus Phlebia subochracea Postia tephroleuca Pycnoporus sanguineus Rigidoporus lineatus Trametes elegans Trametes hirsuta Trametes versicolor Tyromyces galactinus Tyromyces fissilis Xeromphalina fraxinophila Other basidiomycetes |

== Miscellaneous diseases or disorders ==
Miscellaneous diseases or disorders
| Rosy canker | Illuminating gas in soil |

== Nematodes, parasitic ==
Nematodes, parasitic
| Dagger | Xiphinema americanum |
| Lance | Hoplolaimus galeatus |
| Root knot | Meloidogyne sp. |
| Sting | Belonolaimus longicaudatus |
| Stunt | Tylenchorhynchus claytoni |
