= List of sweetgum diseases =

The following is a list of diseases of sweetgum (Liquidambar spp.).

== Bacterial diseases ==
Bacterial diseases
Bacterial canker	Bacterium (unidentified)
Dieback and leaf scorch	Xylella fastidiosa

== Fungal diseases ==
Fungal diseases
Annosum root rot	Heterobasidion annosum Spiniger meineckellus [anamorph]
Armillaria root rot Shoestring root rot	Armillaria mellea Armillaria tabescens = Clitocybe tabescens
Bleeding canker Bleeding necrosis Botryosphaeria canker	Botryosphaeria dothidea Fusicoccum aesculi [anamorph] Botryosphaeria disrupta Botryosphaeria obtusa Sphaeropsis spp. [anamorph] Botryosphaeria rhodina Botryosphaeria ribis Fusicoccum spp. [anamorph]
Canker rots	Cerrena unicolor Inonotus hispidus
Cylindrocladium root rot and blight	Calonectria kyotensis Cylindrocladium scoparium [anamorph]
Endothia canker	Endothia gyrosa Endothiella gyrosa [anamorph]
Fusarium canker	Fusarium solani
Hymenochaete canker	Hymenochaete agglutinans
Leaf gall	Synchytrium liquidambaris
Leaf spots	Cercospora liquidambaris Cercospora tuberculans Cladosporium spp. Dicarpella georgiana Discosia artocreas Apiognomonia errabunda Discula umbrinella [anamorph] Gnomonia petiolorum Macrophoma spp. Monochaetia spp. Peltella spp. Phyllosticta spp. Septoria liquidambaris Stigmina liquidambaris Tubakia dryina
Nectria canker	Nectria spp.
Phymatotrichum root rot Texas root rot	Phymatotrichopsis omnivora = Phymatotrichum omnivorum
Phytophtora collar rot and bleeding canker	Phytophthora cactorum
Rhizoctonia root rot	Rhizoctonia solani
Thread blight	Corticium stevensii
Tubercularia canker	Nectria cinnabarina Tubercularia vulgaris [anamorph]
Wood rots	Bjerkandera adusta Candelobrochaete langioisii Ceriporia xylostromatoides Climacodon pulcherrimus Climacodon septentrionalis Coriolopsis rigida Datronia scutellata Fomes fasciatus Fomitopsis spraguei Ganoderma applanatum Ganoderma lucidum Globiformes graveolens Gloeocystidiellum porosum Hericium erinaceus Inonotus ludovicianus Lentinus tigrinus Oxyporus latemarginatus Oxyporus populinus Perenniporia fraxinea Phellinus gilvus Pleurotus dryinus Pleurotus ostreatus R. lineatus R. ulmarius Schizophyllum commune Spongipellis unicolor Steccherinum ochraceum Trametes versicolor Trichaptum sector Tyromyces fissilis Tyromyces calkinsii Other basidiomycetes
Wood stains	Ceratocystis coerulescens Ceratocystis moniliformis Chalara sp. [anamorph] Fusarium moniliforme Fusarium solani Graphium rigidum Graphium rubrum Lasiodiplodia theobromae Leptographium microsporum Ophiostoma piliferum Sporothrix sp. [anamorph] Ophiostoma pluriannulatum Chalara sp.? [anamorph] Tubeufia pezizula Helicoma muelleri [anamorph]

== Miscellaneous diseases and disorders ==
Miscellaneous diseases and disorders
Leader dieback	unknown cause
Sweetgum blight	unknown cause (drought ?)

== Nematodes, parasitic ==
Nematodes, parasitic
Lance	Hoplolaimus galeatus
Lesion	Pratylenchus sp. Pratylenchus penetrans
Root knot	Meloidogyne sp.
Sheath	Hemicycliophora sp.
Spiral	Helicotylenchus sp.
Stubby root	Trichodorus sp.
Stunt	Tylenchorynchus sp.
