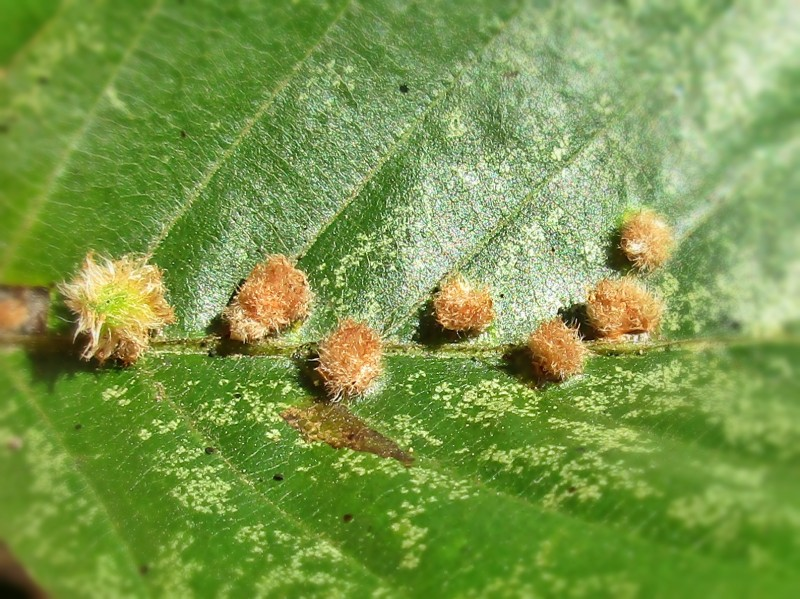
- Galls caused by Hartigiola annulipes on Fagus sylvatica

Scientific classification
- Kingdom: Animalia
- Phylum: Arthropoda
- Class: Insecta
- Order: Diptera
- Family: Cecidomyiidae
- Genus: Hartigiola
- Species: H. annulipes

Binomial name
- Hartigiola annulipes (Hartig, 1839)

Synonyms
- Cecidomyia annulipes Hartig, 1839; Oligotrophus fagineus Kieffer, 1909; Phegobia tornatella (Bremi 1847)

= Hartigiola annulipes =

Species of fly

Hartigiola annulipes is a species of midge fly in the family Cecidomyiidae, found in the Palearctic. The fly was first described by Theodor Hartig in 1839. The larvae gall the leaves of beech (Fagus species).

== Description ==
In the spring, the gall starts as a tiny, flattened dome which can be seen on both surfaces of the leaf. At first the gall is yellowish-green and later changes to reddish-brown. The upper part gradually lengthens into a columnar shape, and in August and September is up to 6 mm high. The gall contain a single white larva, can be smooth or hairy and some develop a point. The gall falls to the floor when the larva is mature, leaving a circular hole in the leaf. Pupation takes place in the fallen gall and the adult midge emerges in the spring to lay eggs on the new leaves. The fly can be found in May and June.

Galls have been recorded on Oriental beech (Fagus orientalis) and European beech (Fagus sylvatica).

== Distribution ==
Hartigiola annulipes is common and found in Europe from Ireland, France and Spain in the west, to Ukraine and Russia in the east.

== Parasite ==
Apiognomonia errabunda may cause the death of larvae when there is a large infestation.
