= Fraxinea =

Fraxinea is a specific epithet and may refer to:

- Perenniporia fraxinea, a plant pathogen
- Ramalina fraxinea, a lichen
- Pterophylla fraxinea, a tree in the family Cunoniaceae
