= Stigmina =

Stigmina may refer to:

- Stigmina (fungus), a genus of fungal plant pathogens
- Stigmina (subtribe), a subtribe of wasps in the subfamily Pemphredoninae
