= Torvalla Virgin Forest Nature Reserve =

Nature reserve in Sweden

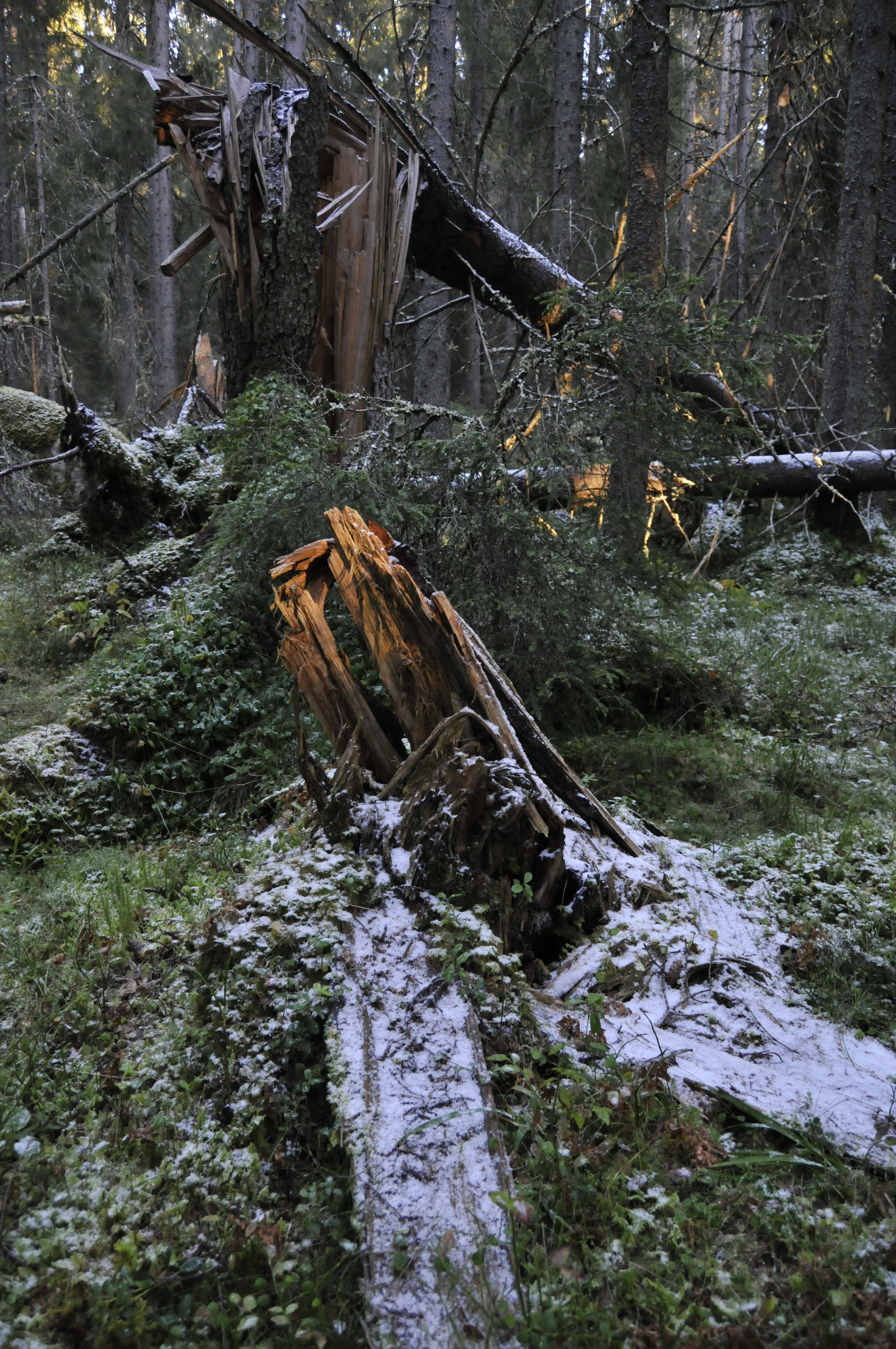

- Location within Jämtland Location within Sweden
- Location: Sweden
- Nearest city: Östersund
- Coordinates: 63°09′N 14°44′E
- Area: 4 ha (9.9 acres)
- Established: 1971

Torvalla Virgin Forest Nature Reserve (Swedish: Torvalla urskogs naturreservat) is a nature reserve in Jämtland County in Sweden.

The nature reserve serves to protect an old-growth forest and a rich fen. The ancient forest is dominated by spruce and Scots pine, with birch, rowan and aspen growing in glades. The great amount of coarse woody debris creates good habitats for many species of fungi, such as Phellinidium ferrugineofuscum, Phlebia mellea and Fomitopsis rosea. The nature reserve also serves as a refuge for birds like black woodpecker and Eurasian three-toed woodpecker. In the rich fen, orchids like fragrant orchid, Dactylorhiza maculata ssp. fuchsii and Listera cordata grow.
