= Phlebia crassisubiculata =

Scientific classification
- Domain: Eukaryota
- Kingdom: Fungi
- Division: Basidiomycota
- Class: Agaricomycetes
- Order: Polyporales
- Family: Meruliaceae
- Genus: Phlebia
- Species: P. crassisubiculata

Binomial name
- Phlebia crassisubiculata Avn.P.Singh, Priyanka, Dhingra & Singla (2010)

Species of fungus

Phlebia crassisubiculata is a species of crust fungus that is found in India. It was described as new to science in 2010. The type specimen was found growing on the underside of a decaying stump of gymnospermous wood in the Dalhousie hills of Himachal Pradesh. The specific epithet crassisubiculata refers to the "conspicuously thick subiculum" (a tissue layer that supports and attaches the tubes to substrate) that is characteristic of the species.

The fruit body of P. crassisubiculata is in the form of a small, thin crust (up to 350 μm thick) with a creamy yellow colour on the surface of the woody substrate. The surface texture of these spots, when viewed with a hand lens, ranges from smooth to minutely hairy–a feature made possible by the cystidia that project from the hymenophore. The spores of P. crassisubiculata are ellipsoid, thin-walled and smooth, measuring 5.1–6.8 x 2.8–4.5 μm.
