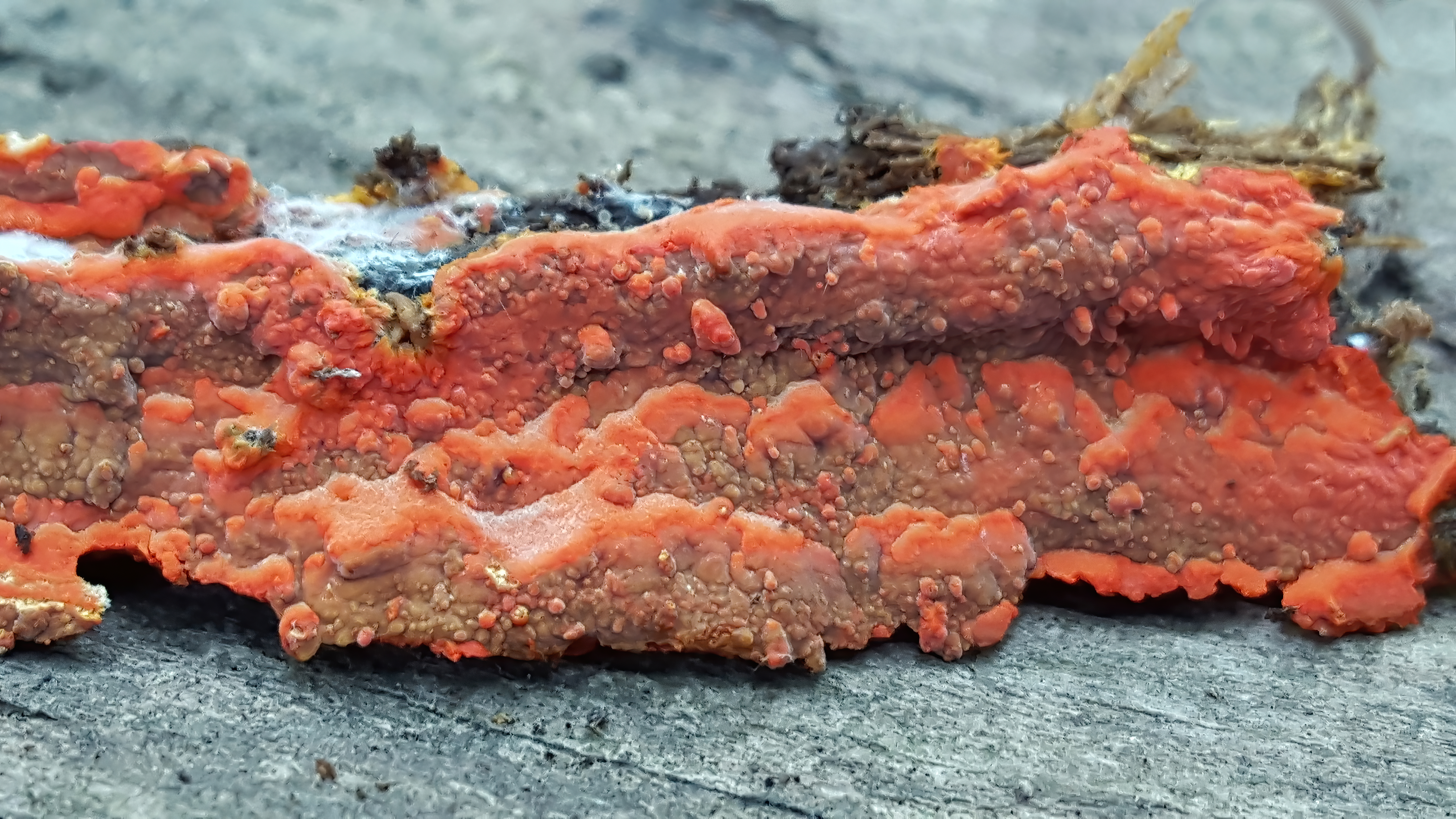

Scientific classification
- Domain: Eukaryota
- Kingdom: Fungi
- Division: Basidiomycota
- Class: Agaricomycetes
- Order: Polyporales
- Family: Meruliaceae
- Genus: Phlebia
- Species: P. coccineofulva

Binomial name
- Phlebia coccineofulva Schwein. (1832)

Synonyms
- Corticium martianum Berk. & M.A.Curtis (1873); Terana martiana (Berk. & M.A.Curtis) Kuntze (1891); Peniophora egelandii Bres. (1911); Peniophora coccineofulva (Schwein.) Burt (1926); Peniophora martiana (Berk. & M.A.Curtis) Burt (1926); Phlebia atkinsoniana W.B.Cooke (1956); Phlebia martiana (Berk. & M.A.Curtis) Parmasto (1967); Phanerochaete velutina f. coccineofulva (Schwein.) Parmasto (1967); Membranicium martianum (Berk. & M.A.Curtis) Y.Hayashi (1974)

= Phlebia coccineofulva =

Species of fungus

Phlebia coccineofulva, commonly known as the scarlet waxcrust, is a species of crust fungus in the family Meruliaceae. It was described as a new species by Lewis David de Schweinitz in 1832. The fungus is found in North America, continental Europe, and northern Asia, where it grows as a saprophyte on decaying stumps and woody forest debris.
