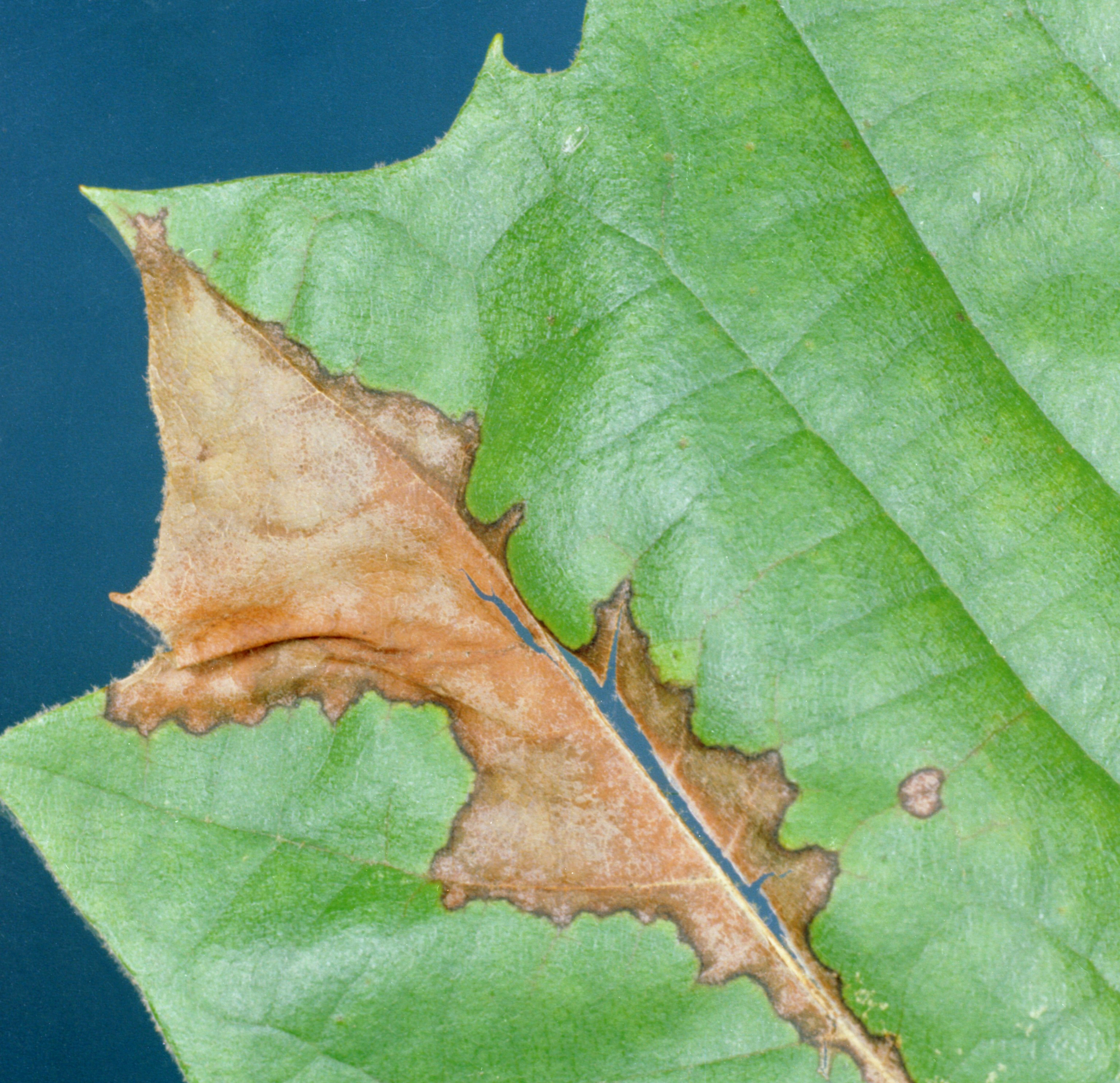
- Apiognomonia veneta

Scientific classification
- Kingdom: Fungi
- Division: Ascomycota
- Class: Sordariomycetes
- Order: Diaporthales
- Family: Gnomoniaceae
- Genus: Apiognomonia; Höhn.

Type species
- Apiognomonia veneta (Sacc. & Speg.) Höhn.

Species
- A. errabunda A. erythrostoma A. petiolicola A. supraseptata A. veneta

= Apiognomonia =

Genus of fungi

Apiognomonia is a genus of fungi in the family Gnomoniaceae. The genus contains 10 species.
