= Stigmina platani-racemosae =

Scientific classification
- Kingdom: Fungi
- Division: Ascomycota
- Class: Dothideomycetes
- Order: Capnodiales
- Family: Mycosphaerellaceae
- Genus: Stigmina
- Species: S. platani-racemosae

Binomial name
- Stigmina platani-racemosae (Dearn. & Barthol.) S.Hughes (1952)

Synonyms
- Stigmella platani-racemosae Dearn. & Barthol. (1929)

Species of fungus

Stigmina platani-racemosae is a fungal plant pathogen in the family Mycosphaerellaceae.
