= Fomes meliae =

Scientific classification
- Kingdom: Fungi
- Division: Basidiomycota
- Class: Agaricomycetes
- Order: Polyporales
- Family: Polyporaceae
- Genus: Fomes
- Species: F. meliae

Binomial name
- Fomes meliae (Underw.) Murrill

Synonyms
- List: Fomitopsis meliae (Underw.) Gilb.; Pilatoporus meliae (Underw.) Kotl. & Pouzar; Polyporus meliae Underw.; Polyporus submurinus (Murrill) Lloyd; Trametes lignea Murrill; Trametes submurina Murrill; Trametes subnivosa Murrill; Tyromyces submurinus (Murrill) Ryvarden; Tyromyces subnivosus (Murrill) Ryvarden

Species of fungus

Fomes meliae is a plant pathogen that causes wood rot on nectarine, peach and Platanus sp. (Sycamore).

== See also ==
- List of Platanus diseases
- List of peach and nectarine diseases
