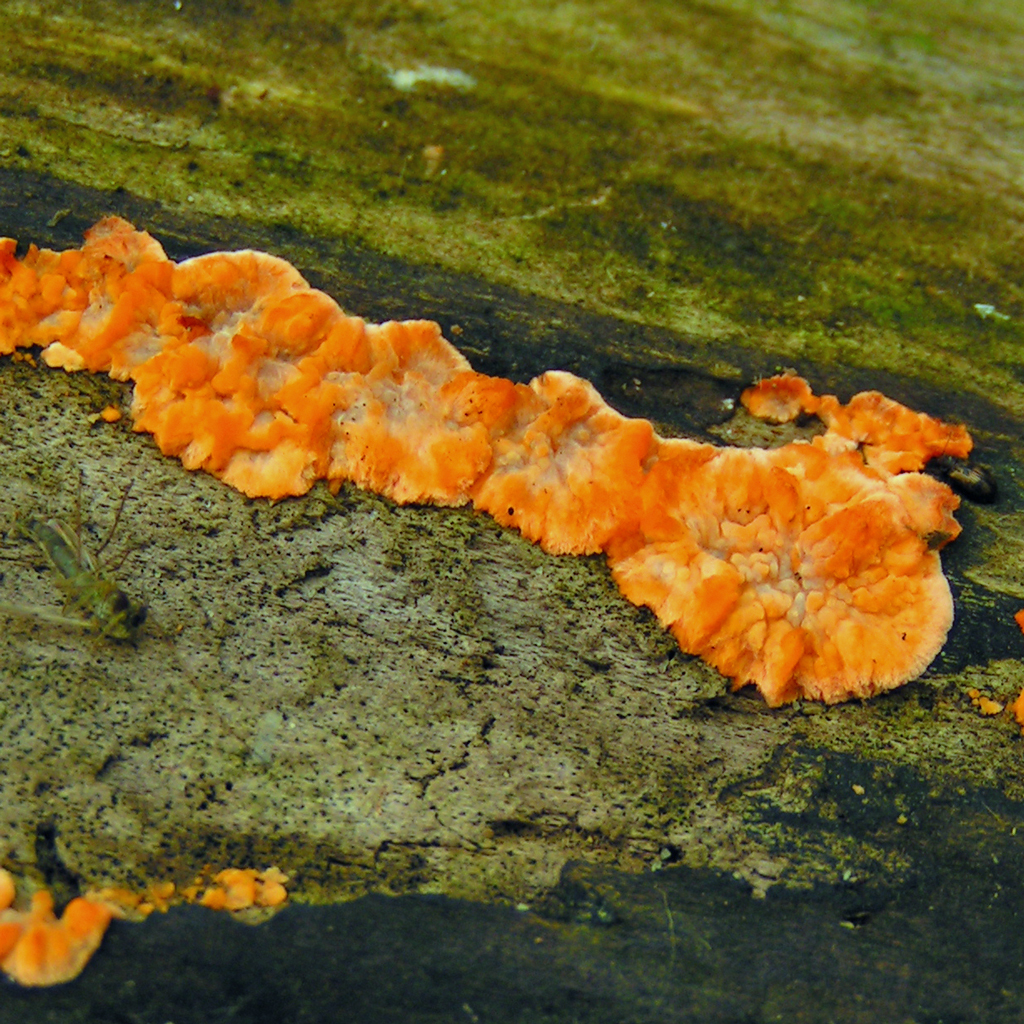
- Phlebia radiata

Scientific classification
- Kingdom: Fungi
- Division: Basidiomycota
- Class: Agaricomycetes
- Order: Polyporales
- Family: Meruliaceae
- Genus: Phlebia; Fr. (1821)

Type species
- Phlebia radiata Fr. (1821)

Species
- 86, see text

Synonyms
- Ricnophora Pers. (1825)

= Phlebia =

Genus of fungi

Phlebia is a genus of mostly crust fungi in the family Meruliaceae. The genus has a widespread distribution. Phlebia species cause white rot.

== Taxonomy ==
Phlebia was circumscribed by Swedish mycologist Elias Fries in his 1821 work Systema Mycologicum. He included four species: P. merismoides, P. radiata, P. contorta, and P. vaga.

Several molecular studies have demonstrated that Phlebia is a collection of sometimes unrelated taxa that share some morphological similarities. In a 2015 study, Floudas and Hibbett identified a "core Phlebia clade" within the larger Phlebioid clade, containing P. radiata, P. acerina, P. floridensis, P. setulosa, P. brevispora, and P. tremellosa. A subsequent study suggested that P. lindtneri, P. serialis and P. leptospermi should be added to this core group.

Phlebia-like fungi with aculei (spines) are often included in the genera Mycoacia if they are monomitic, and Mycoaciella if they are dimitic or trimitic.

== Species ==
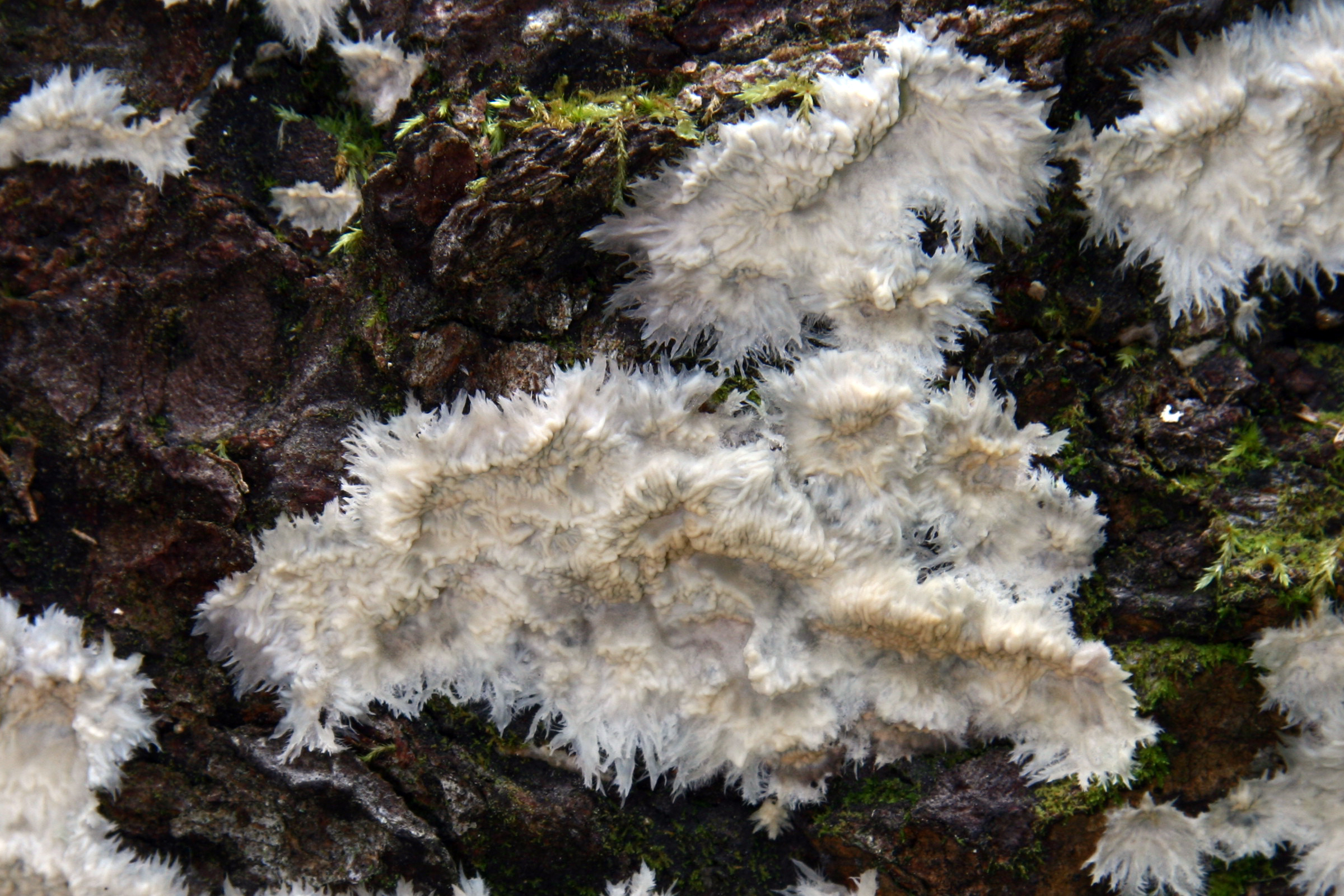
Phlebia centrifuga

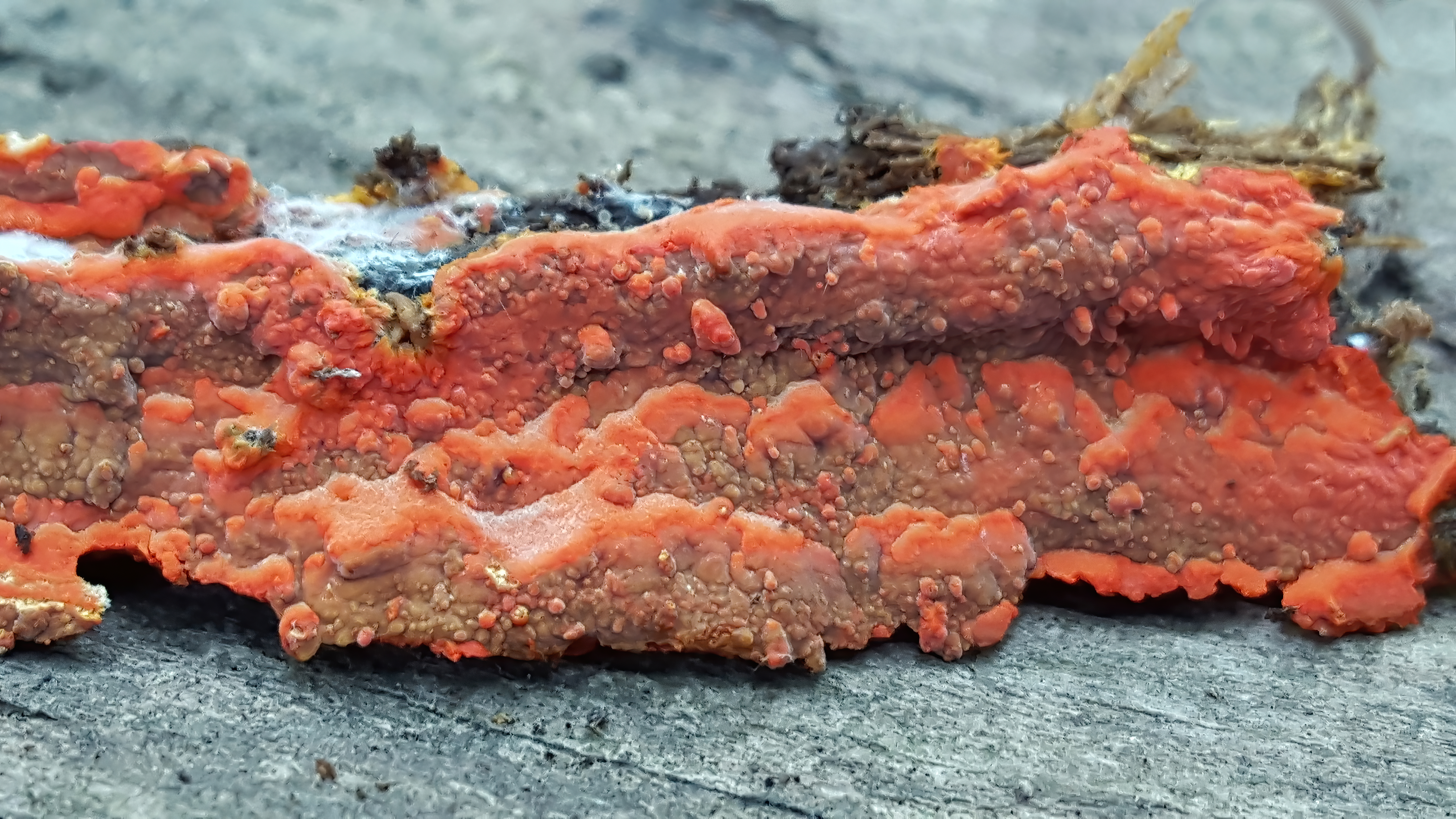
Phlebia coccineofulva

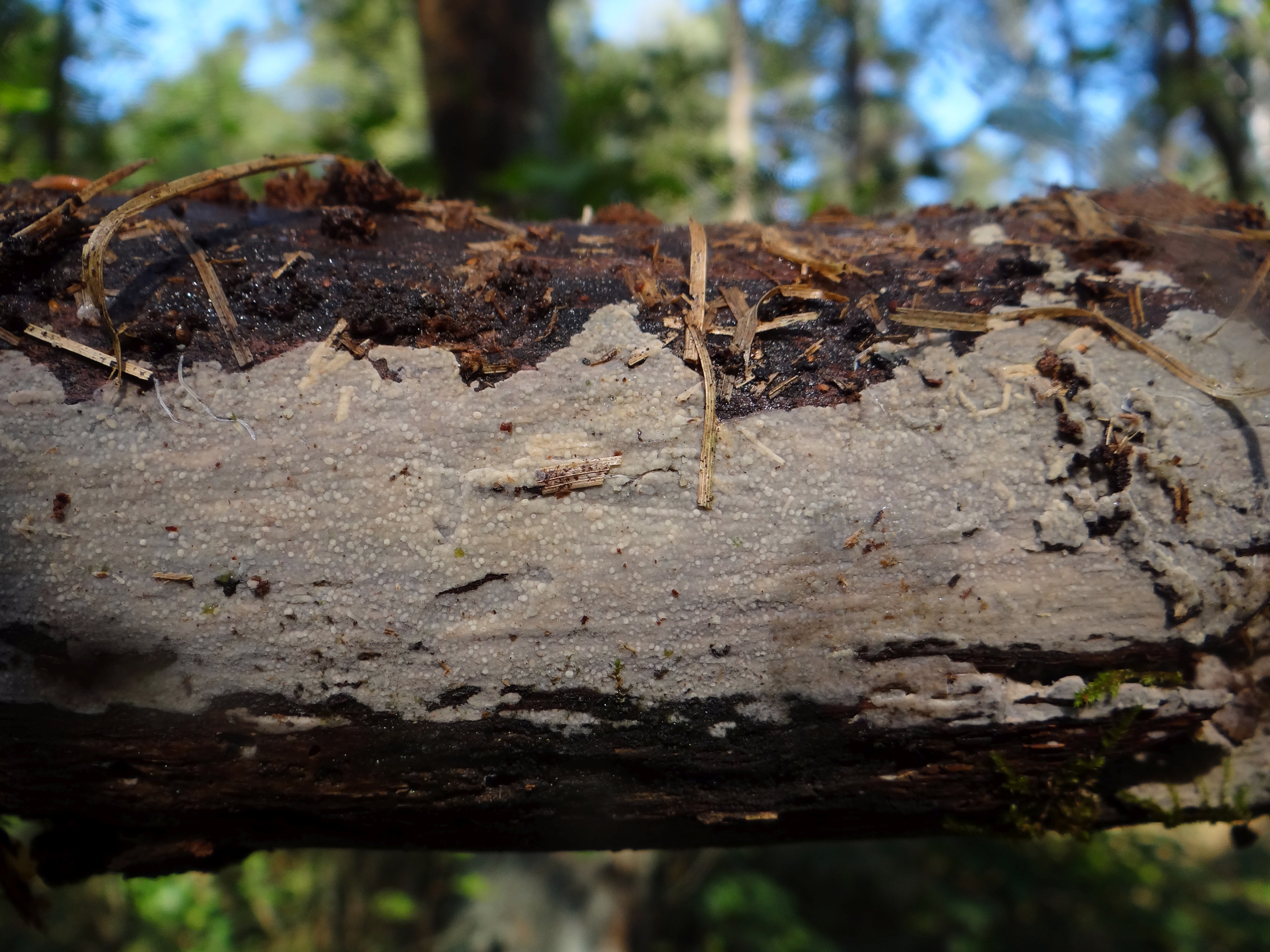
Phlebia lilascens

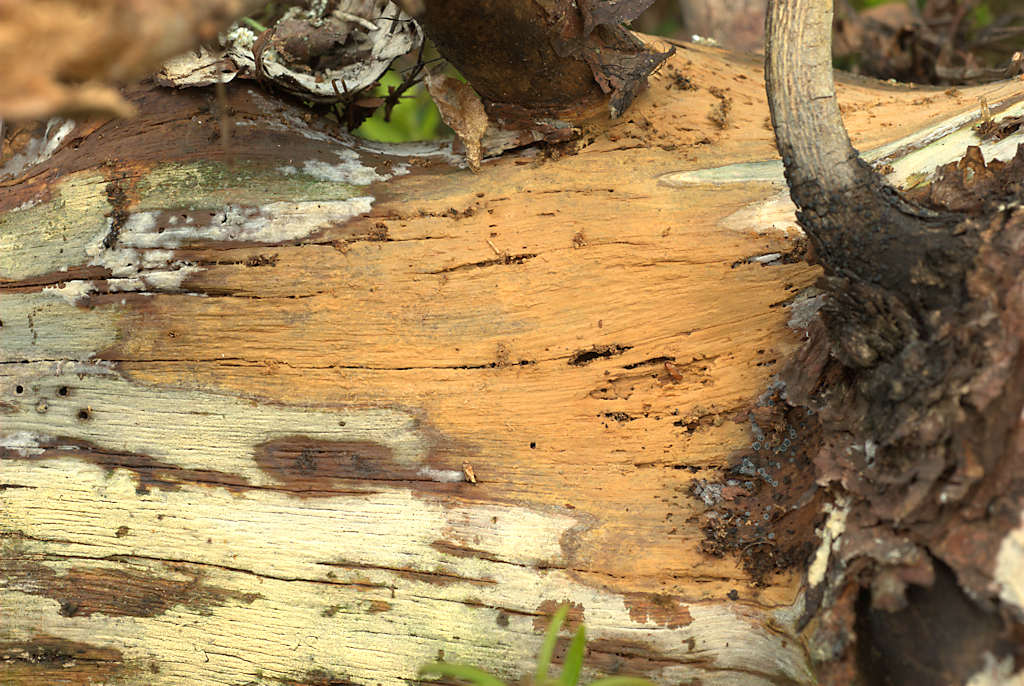
Phlebia serialis

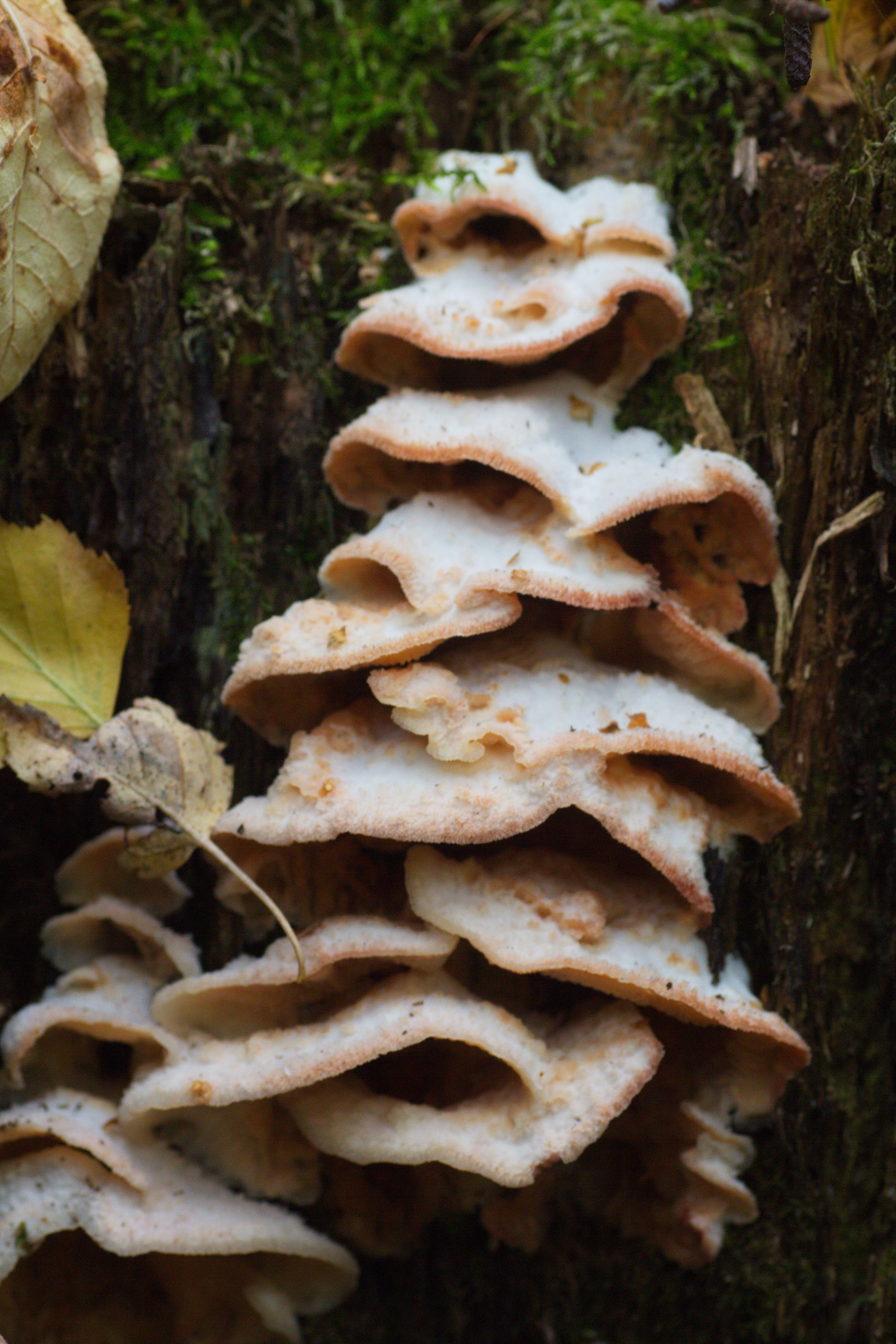
Phlebia tremellosa

As of May 2018, Index Fungorum accepts 89 species of Phlebia:

- P. anthocystis Gilb. & Nakasone (1998) – Hawaii
- P. acerina Peck (1889)
- P. alni Velen. (1922)
- P. amylostratosa Svrček (1973)
- P. ardesiaca Parmasto (1967)
- P. argentea Parmasto (1967)
- P. argentina (Speg.) Rajchenb. & J.E.Wright (1987)
- P. argentinensis W.B.Cooke (1956)
- P. brevibasidia G.Kaur, Avn.P. Singh & Dhingra (2017) – Punjab, India
- P. brevispora Nakasone (1981)
- P. brunneofusca (Hjortstam & Ryvarden) Nakasone & Gilb. (1998)
- P. canadensis W.B.Cooke (1956)
- P. capitata Bernicchia & Gorjón (2010)
- P. caspica Hallenb. (1980)
- P. castanea Lloyd (1922)
- P. celtidis W.B.Cooke (1956)
- P. centrifuga P.Karst. (1881)
- P. cinnamomea Rick (1960)
- P. citrea (Pat.) Nakasone (2003)
- P. coccineofulva Schwein. (1832)
- P. columellifera (G.Cunn.) Duhem (2009)
- P. crassisubiculata Avn.P. Singh, Priyanka, Dhingra & Singla (2010) – Himachal Pradesh, India
- P. cristata Velen. (1922)
- P. cystidiata H.S.Jacks. ex W.B.Cooke (1956)
- P. diaphana Parmasto ex K.H.Larss. & Hjortstam (1986)
- P. dictyophoroides Sang H.Lin & Z.C.Chen (1990)
- P. diffissa J.Erikss. & Hjortstam (1981)
- P. donkii Bourdot (1930)
- P. epithelioides P.Roberts (2000) – Cameroon
- P. faviformis W.B.Cooke (1958)
- P. femsjoeensis (Litsch. & S.Lundell) J.Erikss. & Hjortstam (1981)
- P. firma J.Erikss. & Hjortstam (1981)
- P. flavocrocea (Bres.) Donk (1957)
- P. floridensis Nakasone & Burds. (1995) – United States
- P. formosana Sheng H.Wu (1990) – Taiwan
- P. fragilis (G.Cunn.) Gorjón & Gresl. (2012)
- P. gilbertsonii Nakasone (1997)
- P. griseoflavescens (Litsch.) J.Erikss. & Hjortstam (1981) – Europe
- P. griseolivens (Bourdot & Galzin) Parmasto (1967)
- P. hydnoidea Schwein. (1832)
- P. icterina P.Roberts (2000) – Cameroon
- P. introversa (Rehill & B.K.Bakshi) Hjortstam (1995)
- P. jurassica Duhem & M.Duenas (2013) – Europe
- P. lacteola (Bourdot) M.P.Christ. (1960) – Great Britain
- P. leptospermi (G.Cunn.) Stalpers (1985) – Western Australia
- P. lilascens (Bourdot) J.Erikss. & Hjortstam (1981) – Europe
- P. livida (Pers.) Bres. (1897) – Africa; Europe; North America
- P. lividina Hjortstam (1995) – South Carolina, USA
- P. ludoviciana (Burt) Nakasone & Burds. (1982)
- P. margaritae Duhem & H.Michel (2007)
- P. merulioides Lloyd (1915)
- P. moelleriana Henn. (1897)
- P. murrillii W.B.Cooke (1956)
- P. nantahaliensis Nakasone & Burds. (1995)
- P. nitidula (P.Karst.) Ryvarden (1971)
- P. pallidolivens (Bourdot & Galzin) Parmasto (1967)
- P. parva Ghob.-Nejh. (2012)
- P. patriciae Gilb. & Hemmes (2004) – Hawaii
- P. pellucida Hjortstam & Ryvarden (1988) – China
- P. phlebioides (H.S.Jacks. & Dearden) Donk (1957)
- P. plumbea Parmasto (1967)
- P. pulcherrima Parmasto (1967)
- P. pyrenaica Duhem (2009)
- P. radiata Fr. (1821)
- P. rhodana Duhem & B.Rivoire (2014)
- P. rufa (Pers.) M.P.Christ. (1960) – Europe; Jamaica
- P. ryvardenii Hallenb. & Hjortstam (1988)
- P. scarlatina _{J.A. Cooper (2023)}
- P. sedimenticola (S.Ahmad) S.Ahmad (1972)
- P. segregata (Bourdot & Galzin) Parmasto (1967) – Europe
- P. separata (H.S.Jacks. & Dearden) Parmasto (1967)
- P. serialis (Fr.) Donk (1957) – Sweden
- P. sordida Rick (1938) – South America
- P. subceracea (Wakef.) Nakasone (2003) – Australia
- P. subconspersa (Rick) Baltazar & Rajchenb. (2016)
- P. subfascicularis (Wakef.) Nakasone & Gilb. (1998) – Australia
- P. sublilascens (Litsch.) Parmasto (1967)
- P. sublivida Parmasto (1967)
- P. subochracea (Alb. & Schwein.) J.Erikss. & Ryvarden (1976) – Europe
- P. subserialis (Bourdot & Galzin) Donk (1957) – Europe
- P. subulata J.Erikss. & Hjortstam (1981)
- P. totara (G.Cunn.) Stalpers & P.K.Buchanan (1991)
- P. tremellosa (Schrad.) Nakasone & Burds. (1984)
- P. tuberculata (Berk. & M.A.Curtis) Ţura, Zmitr., Wasser & Spirin (2011)
- P. unica (H.S.Jacks. & Dearden) Ginns (1984)
- P. verruculosa Hjortstam & Ryvarden (1980)
- P. vinosa (Overh.) Burds. (1990)
- P. viridesalebrosa J.Erikss. & Hjortstam (1981) – Europe
- P. weldeniana Nakasone & Burds. (1995)
- P. wrightii (Berk. & M.A.Curtis) Duhem (2010)
