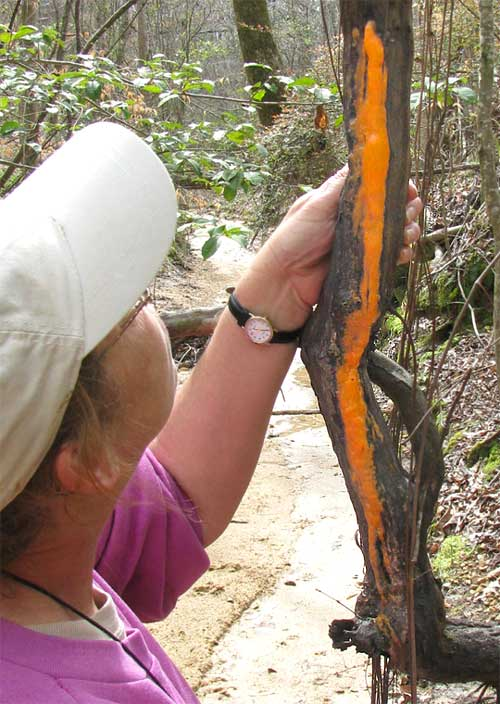
- Fusicolla merismoides slime flux

Scientific classification
- Kingdom: Fungi
- Division: Ascomycota
- Class: Sordariomycetes
- Order: Hypocreales
- Family: Nectriaceae
- Genus: Fusicolla
- Species: F. merismoides

Binomial name
- Fusicolla merismoides (Corda) Gräfenhan, Seifert & Schroers, 2011

= Fusicolla merismoides =

Species of fungus

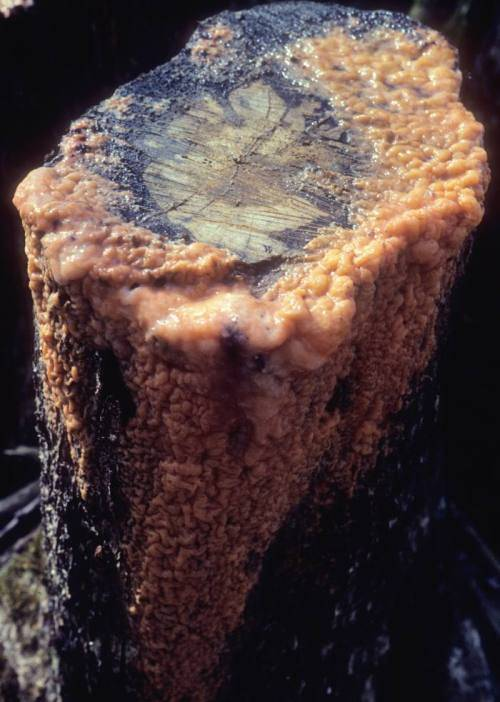
Fusicolla merismoides

Fusicolla merismoides, formerly, Fusarium merismoides can be thought of two ways: first, as a species of sac fungus or ascomycetes of the phylum of Ascomycota, and belonging to the highly diverse family Nectriaceae. The fungus's nearly microscopic body consists of a thin, branching, filamentous structure, a hypha.

A second concept of Fusicolla merismoides, often encountered in field guides, applies to a kind of "slime flux" occasionally seen forming colorful, slimy, amorphous masses oozing and dripping from certain plants. Well developed masses probably contain the sac fungus Fusicolla merismoides, but possibly not.

It is a fungal plant pathogen.

== Description ==
=== As a filamentous fungus ===
All species of Fusicolla possess yellow, pale buff to orange, spherical to pear-shaped perithecia producing ascospores. The perithecia are fully or partially immersed in stromata. No form of sexual reproduction is known for Fusicolla merismoides. It reproduces by means of abundant sporodochia, which bear conidiophores on which asexual spores or conidia develop. In the citation just presented, the fungus is known by its synonym Fusarium merismoides.

=== As a slime flux ===
Most people notice the fungus in a form which some drolls refer to as "deer vomit”. Usually it's bright orange but sometimes white, yellow or burgundy. More politely it can be called a "slime flux" because of its sliminess, the "flux" part referring to its very slow running, dripping movement. Sometimes it's described as a "fungal volcano" because it's something bright appearing to erupt from wounds on woody plants.

== Distribution ==
Fusicolla merismoides occurs worldwide; it is regarded as cosmopolitan.

== Habitat ==
The specific ascomycete fungus known as Fusicolla merismoides commonly is encountered in soils, polluted water, rotting plant material, and many other substrates. The type specimen upon which the 1838 basionym for Fusarium merismides was based, inhabited very wet shards of a plant pot during wintertime in Prague. In Belgium it has been found in air-conditioner humidifier water. In the UK it's appeared on seeds of Pinus caribaea and in the previous USSR on oaks.

In its slime flux form it's encountered mainly on woody plants, including European birch and hornbeam trees. An image on this page shows orange slime flux on the stem of a muscadine grapevine in Mississippi, USA.

== Life history ==
Though much still is unknown about Fusicolla merismoides, probably it's best to regard the species as a saprophyte with the potential to cause certain plant diseases if environmental conditions are appropriate.

Slime fluxes seen in the field are colonies of slowly growing individuals of various species taking advantage of sap issuing from plant wounds, the sap being up to 1% energy-providing sugar. Colony population structure varies over time. Early on, the slime is thin with no structure, but then species of plankton-type yeasts move in and thicken it. In later stages, hyphae of filamentous fungi of various species thicken the slime and provide structural support for yet other microbes. It's even been observed that vascular channels may form, distributing nutrients in a film of the bacterium Escherichia coli.

Seeing such an evolving community with its mutualistic interactions has inspired some to speculate that "... life emerges and evolves in complexity wherever in the universe stable energy gradients are found, life being the most efficient way to dissipate energy across a gradient." These communities are also like "real life" in that some species populating it may produce toxins which prevent close relatives from joining the community.

== Human interactions ==
Fusicolla merismoides has been reported as an important source of anticancer agents. the protein kinase inhibitor azepinostatin.

It doesn't appear to damage crops, though it's been described as either a saprophyte or a weak wound pathogen, the latter term suggesting that it may aggravate a plant's wound but not kill it.

== Taxonomy ==
Though historically Fusicolla merismoides was assumed to belong to the genus Fusarium, now phylogenetic analysis suggests that it's different.

The ascmycetes species concept for the name Fusicolla merismoides, based on morphological features, was established by Wolleneber & Reinking in 1935. In 2011, Gräfenhan, Seifert and Schroers changed the Fusicolla merismoides species concept based on a new combination of traits.

When dealing with the filamentous fungus known as Fusicolla merismoides, it should be kept in mind that the name may be applied to a complex of closely related species, the boundaries between which are unclear; as such, the name Fusicolla merismoides denotes a species complex.

The name Fusicolla merismoides when applied to the flux slime has no taxonomic value beyond suggesting that the filamentous fungus known as Fusicolla merismoides probably is present, though maybe not. The slime flux is an evolving community of interrelating species.

=== Synonyms ===
In 2026, these synonyms and combinations were accepted for Fusicolla merismoides:

- Fusarium merismoides Corda
- Fusarium merismoides var. artocarpi X.H. Fu & Q.T. Chen
- Fusarium merismoides var. chlamydosporale Wollenw.
- Fusarium merismoides var. majus Wollenw.
- Fusarium merismoides var. persicicola X.H. Fu & Q.T. Chen
- Fusarium nicotianae Oudem.
- Fusarium oxysporum f. nicotianae (Oudem.) Subram. DC (Ambiguous)
- Volutella nicotianae Oudem.
- Fusarium rimosum (Peck) Sacc.
- Fusisporium rimosum Peck

=== Phylogeny ===
A poster presented at the Fourth International Barcode of Life Conference in 2011 stated that Fusicolla merismoides appears to be a large complex of many phylogenetic species. "Almost every strain barcoded to date has a different sequence," it stated.

=== Etymology ===
The genus name Fusicolla appears to be based on the New Latin fusus, meaning "spindle", one description of a spindle being an object tapering at both ends. The suffix -colla comes from the Latin colla, based on the Greek kolla, meaning "glue", and the extended meaning "gelatinous". Thus "spindle-glue", a term taking aim at the spindle-shaped asexual spores, or conidia, suspended in the gelatinous slime flux formed by the genus's species.

In the species name merismoides, the merismo is from Greek meros, meaning "part". The -oides is from Greek meaning "similar to". "Similar parts", then, which might befit an amorphous, oozing community of Fusicolla merismoides.

== See also ==
- List of maize diseases
- List of Platanus diseases
