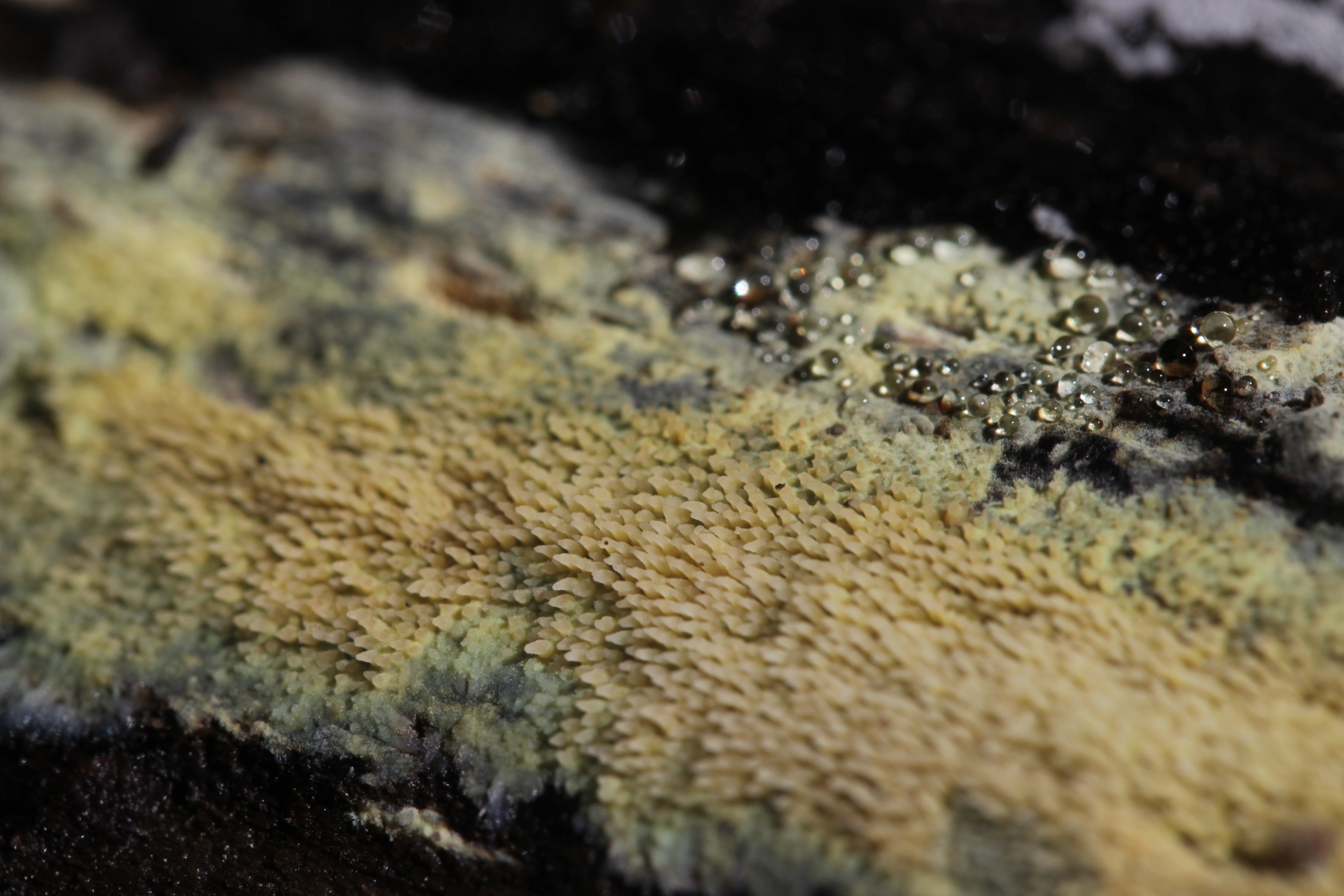

Scientific classification
- Kingdom: Fungi
- Division: Basidiomycota
- Class: Agaricomycetes
- Order: Polyporales
- Family: Meruliaceae
- Genus: Mycoaciella; J.Erikss. & Ryvarden (1978)

Type species
- Mycoaciella bispora (Stalpers) J.Erikss. & Ryvarden (1978)

Species
- M. badia M. bispora M. brunnea M. dusenii M. hinnulea

Synonyms
- Ceraceohydnum Jülich (1978)

= Mycoaciella =

Genus of fungi

Mycoaciella is a genus of corticioid fungi in the family Meruliaceae. The genus was circumscribed by John Eriksson and Leif Ryvarden in 1978. After microscopic examination of the three species then in the genus, Karen Nakasone proposed to synonymize Mycoaciella with Phlebia.

== Species ==
- Mycoaciella badia (Pat.) Hjortstam & Ryvarden 2004)
- Mycoaciella bispora (Stalpers) J.Erikss. & Ryvarden (1978)
- Mycoaciella brunnea (Jülich) Hjortstam & Spooner (1990)
- Mycoaciella dusenii (Henn.) Hjortstam & Ryvarden (2009)
- Mycoaciella hinnulea (Bres.) Hjortstam & Ryvarden (1980)
