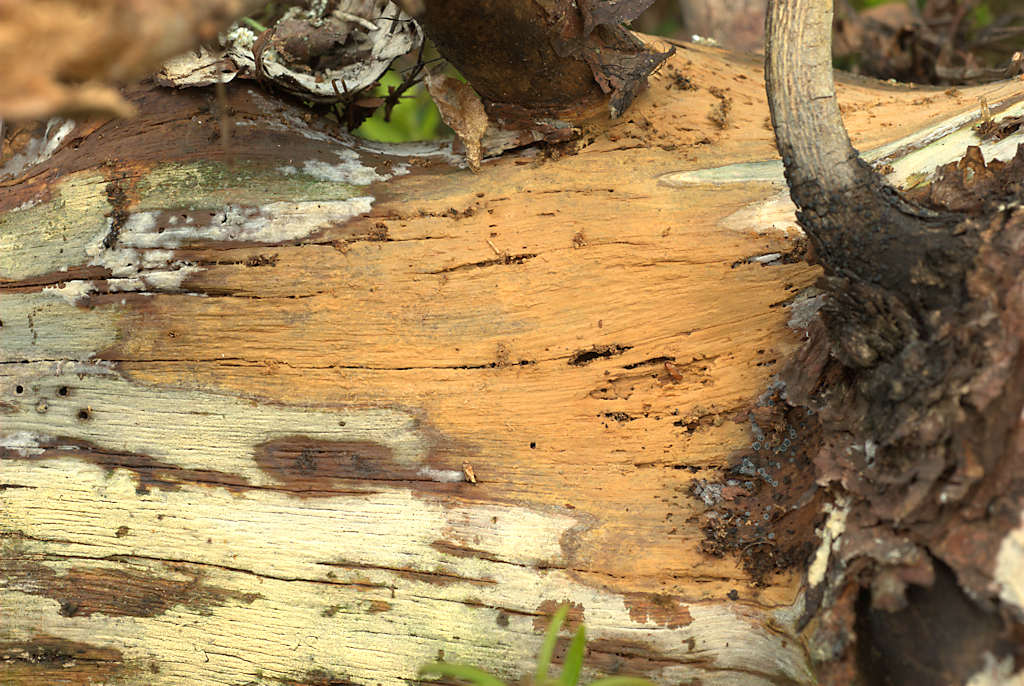

Scientific classification
- Domain: Eukaryota
- Kingdom: Fungi
- Division: Basidiomycota
- Class: Agaricomycetes
- Order: Polyporales
- Family: Meruliaceae
- Genus: Phlebia
- Species: P. serialis

Binomial name
- Phlebia serialis (Fr.) Donk

= Phlebia serialis =

Species of fungus

Phlebia serialis is a species of fungus belonging to the family Meruliaceae.

It is native to Eurasia and Northern America.
