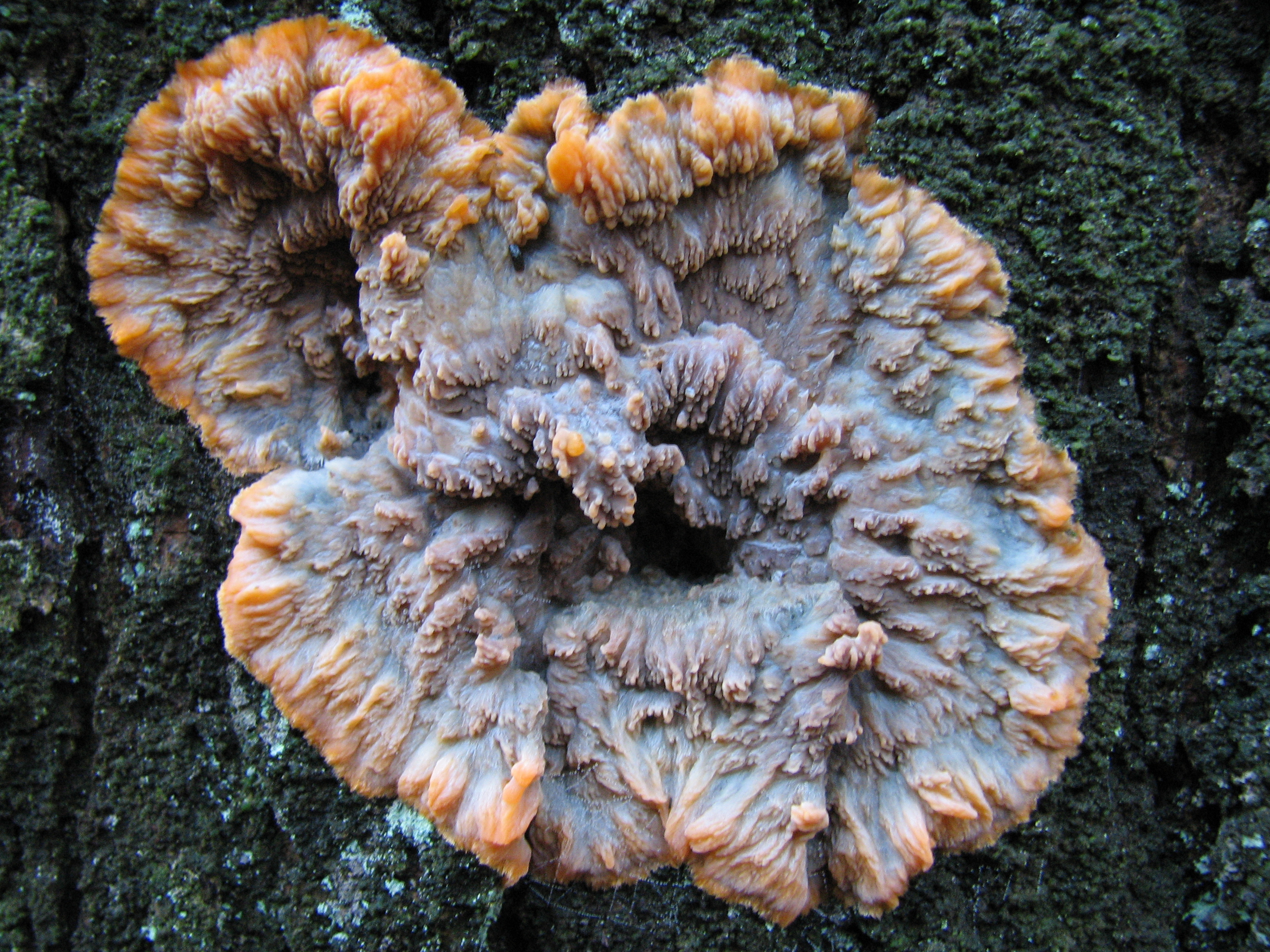

Scientific classification
- Kingdom: Fungi
- Division: Basidiomycota
- Class: Agaricomycetes
- Order: Polyporales
- Family: Meruliaceae
- Genus: Phlebia
- Species: P. radiata

Binomial name
- Phlebia radiata Fr. (1821)

= Phlebia radiata =

Species of fungus

Phlebia radiata
- Mycological characteristics
- Pores on hymenium
- No distinct cap
- Hymenium attachment is not applicable
- Lacks a stipe
- Spore print is white
- Ecology is saprotrophic
- Edibility is inedible

Phlebia radiata, commonly known as the wrinkled crust, is a common species of crust fungus in the family Meruliaceae. It grows as a wrinkled, orange to pinkish waxy crust on the decaying wood of coniferous and deciduous trees, in which it causes a white rot.

== Taxonomy ==
The fungus was first described scientifically in 1821 by Elias Magnus Fries.

== Description ==
The fruit body of Phlebia radiata is resupinate—flattened against its substrate like a crust. It is wrinkled, orange to pinkish in color, and has a waxy texture. It is circular to irregular in shape, reaching a diameter up to 10 cm (4 in), although neighbouring fruitbodies may be fused together to form larger complexes up to 30 cm (12 in) in diameter. The soft texture of the flesh hardens when the fruitbody becomes old. The fungus is inedible.

In mass, the spores are white. Microscopic examination reveals additional spore details: they are smooth, allantoid (sausage-shaped) to elliptical, and inamyloid, measuring 3.5–7 by 1–3 μm.

=== Similar species ===
Similar species include Botryobasidium vagum, Meruliporia incrassata, Piloderma bicolor, and Serpula lacrymans.

== Habitat and distribution ==
Phlebia radiata is a saprophytic species, and causes a white rot in the wood it colonizes, fallen logs and branches of both coniferous and hardwood trees. It is widespread in the Northern Hemisphere.
