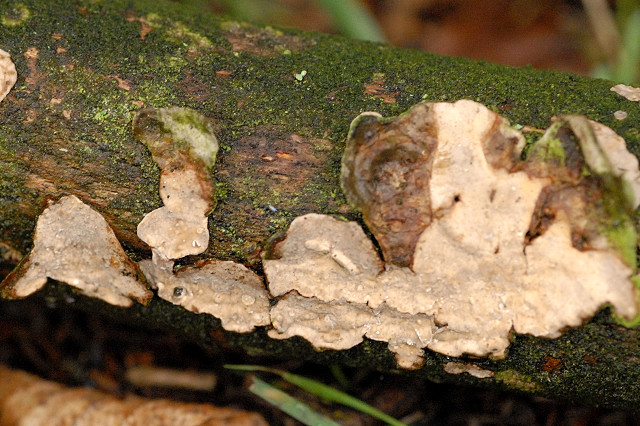
- Phanerochaete velutina

Scientific classification
- Kingdom: Fungi
- Division: Basidiomycota
- Class: Agaricomycetes
- Order: Polyporales
- Family: Phanerochaetaceae
- Genus: Phanerochaete; P.Karst (1889)

Type species
- Phanerochaete alnea (Fr.) P.Karst. (1889)

Synonyms
- Corticium Fr. (1835); Xerocarpus P.Karst. (1881); Grandiniella P.Karst. (1895); Membranicium J.Erikss. (1958)

= Phanerochaete =

Genus of fungi

Phanerochaete is a genus of crust fungi in the family Phanerochaetaceae.

== Taxonomy ==
The genus was circumscribed by Finnish mycologist Petter Karsten in 1889. Marinus Anton Donk redefined the limits of the genus in two publications in 1957 and 1962. Phanerochaete has traditionally been delimited based on the overall morphology of the fruit body, as well as microscopic characteristics including the nature of the hyphal structure, cystidia, and spores. Molecular analyses demonstrate that the genus is polyphyletic, containing members placed throughout the phlebioid clade of the Polyporales.

The genus name is derived from the Greek words φανεφός ("distinct") and χαίτη ("hair").

== Description ==
Phanerochaete species have membranaceous, crust-like fruit bodies. The hyphal system is monomitic, with simple-septate generative hyphae; single or multiple clamps may be present in the subiculum. The basidia (spore-bearing cells) are club-shaped and smooth. Spores of the genus are thin-walled, inamyloid, hyaline, and have a cylindrical to ellipsoidal shape. Phanerochaete species cause white rot on both conifers and hardwoods.

== Chemistry ==
Phanerochaete includes white rot fungi that are able to degrade the woody polymer lignin to carbon dioxide. This is achieved, in part, by lignin peroxidases and manganese peroxidases. These peroxidases are also able to mediate oxidation of a wide variety of organic pollutants. The genome of Phanerochaete chrysosporium was sequenced and shows the genetic potential to make over 100 cytochrome P450 monooxygenases. White rot fungi have been used in bioremediation efforts to break down potentially harmful chemicals in soil and in water. For example, phenol-formaldehyde is degraded by P. chrysosporium, while P. sordida breaks down the neonicotinoid pesticide clothianidin.

== Species ==
As of March 2025, Index Fungorum accepts 101 species of Phanerochaete:

- Phanerochaete aculeata Hallenb. (1978)
- Phanerochaete affinis (Burt) Parmasto (1968)
- Phanerochaete alba Sang H.Lin & Z.C.Chen (1990) – Taiwan
- Phanerochaete albida Sheng H.Wu (1990)
- Phanerochaete allantospora Burds. & Gilb. (1974)
- Phanerochaete alnea (Fr.) P.Karst. (1889)
- Phanerochaete aluticolor (Bres. & Torrend) Melo, J.Cardoso, M.Dueñas, Salcedo & Tellería (2012)
- Phanerochaete andreae Burds., Beltrán-Tej. & Rodr.-Armas (1995)
- Phanerochaete angustocystidiata Sheng H.Wu (2000) – Taiwan
- Phanerochaete arenata (P.H.B.Talbot) Jülich (1979)
- Phanerochaete areolata (G.Cunn.) Hjortstam & Ryvarden (1990)
- Phanerochaete argillacea Sheng H.Wu (1998) – Taiwan
- Phanerochaete arizonica Burds. & Gilb. (1974)
- Phanerochaete aurantiobadia Ghobad-Nejhad, S.L.Liu & E.Langer (2015)
- Phanerochaete australis Jülich (1980)
- Phanerochaete avellanea (Bres.) J.Erikss. & Hjortstam (1981)
- Phanerochaete bambucicola Sheng H.Wu (2018)
- Phanerochaete binucleospordida Boidin, Lanq. & Gilles (1993)
- Phanerochaete brunnea Sheng H.Wu (1990)
- Phanerochaete bubalina Burds. (1985)
- Phanerochaete burtii (Romell ex Burt) Parmasto (1967)
- Phanerochaete cacaina (Bourdot & Galzin) Burds. & Gilb. (1974)
- Phanerochaete cana (Burt) Burds. (1985)
- Phanerochaete canobrunnea Sheng H. Wu, C.C. Chen & C.L. Wei (2018) - Taiwan
- Phanerochaete capitata Sheng H.Wu (1998) – Taiwan
- Phanerochaete carnosa (Burt) Parmasto (1967)
- Phanerochaete caucasica (Parmasto) Burds. (1985)
- Phanerochaete citri A.B.De (1991) – India
- Phanerochaete citrinosanguinea D.Floudas & Hibbett (2015)
- Phanerochaete commixtoides Sang H.Lin & Z.C.Chen (1990)
- Phanerochaete conifericola D.Floudas & D.S.Hibbett (2015)
- Phanerochaete cordylines (G.Cunn.) Burds. (1985)
- Phanerochaete cremeo-ochracea (Bourdot & Galzin) Hjortstam (1987)
- Phanerochaete crescentispora Gilb. & Hemmes (2001)
- Phanerochaete cryptocystidiata Nakasone (2008)
- Phanerochaete cystidiata Sheng H. Wu, C.C. Chen & C.L. Wei - Taiwan
- Phanerochaete deflectens (P.Karst.) Hjortstam (1987)
- Phanerochaete eburnea Sheng H.Wu (1998) – Taiwan
- Phanerochaete eichleriana Bres. (1903)
- Phanerochaete emplastra (Berk. & Broome) Hjortstam (1989)
- Phanerochaete exigua (Burt) Nakasone, Burds. & Lodge (1998)
- Phanerochaete exilis (Burt) Burds. (1985)
- Phanerochaete flava (Burt) Nakasone, Burds. & Lodge (1998)
- Phanerochaete flavidogrisea Sheng H.Wu (1998) – Taiwan
- Phanerochaete flavocarnea (Petch) Hjortstam (1995)
- Phanerochaete fulva Sheng H.Wu (1998) – Taiwan
- Phanerochaete furfuraceovelutinus (Rick) Rajchenb. (1987)
- Phanerochaete fusca Sheng H. Wu, C.C. Chen & C.L. Wei (2018) - China
- Phanerochaete globosa Sang H.Lin & Z.C.Chen (1990) – Taiwan
- Phanerochaete granulata Sheng H.Wu (2007)
- Phanerochaete hiulca (Burt) A.L.Welden (1980)
- Phanerochaete hyphocystidiata Sheng H.Wu (1998) – Taiwan
- Phanerochaete incarnata Sheng H.Wu (2017) – Taiwan
- Phanerochaete incrustans (Speg.) Rajchenb. & J.E.Wright (1987)
- Phanerochaete infuscata Hjortstam & Ryvarden (2004)
- Phanerochaete intertexta Sheng H.Wu (1990)
- Phanerochaete investiens (Berk.) P.Roberts (2009)
- Phanerochaete jose-ferreirae (D.A.Reid) D.A.Reid (1975)
- Phanerochaete laevis (Fr.) J.Erikss. & Ryvarden (1978)
- Phanerochaete leptoderma Sheng H.Wu (1990)
- Phanerochaete lutea (Sheng H.Wu) Hjortstam (1995)
- Phanerochaete luteoaurantiaca (Wakef.) Burds. (1985)
- Phanerochaete macrocystidiata Hallenb. (1978)
- Phanerochaete martelliana (Bres.) J.Erikss. & Ryvarden (1978)
- Phanerochaete mauiensis Gilb. & Adask. (1993)
- Phanerochaete odontoidea Sheng H.Wu (2000) – Taiwan
- Phanerochaete oreophila Gilb. & Hemmes (2004)
- Phanerochaete pallida Parmasto (1967)
- Phanerochaete parmastoi Sheng H.Wu (1990)
- Phanerochaete parvispora Sheng H.Wu & Losi (1995) – Europe
- Phanerochaete percitrina P.Roberts & Hjortstam (2000) – Africa
- Phanerochaete phosphorescens (Burt) A.L.Welden (1980)
- Phanerochaete porostereoides S.L.Liu & S.H.He (2016) – China
- Phanerochaete pseudosanguinea D.Floudas & D.S.Hibbett (2015)
- Phanerochaete queletii (Bres.) Nakasone (2008)
- Phanerochaete radulans Hallenb. (1978)
- Phanerochaete reflexa Sheng H.Wu (1998) – Taiwan
- Phanerochaete rhodella (Peck) D.Floudas & D.S.Hibbett (2015)
- Phanerochaete robusta Parmasto (1968)
- Phanerochaete rubescens Sheng H.Wu (1998) – Taiwan
- Phanerochaete sacchari (Burt) Burds. (1985)
- Phanerochaete salmoneolutea Burds. & Gilb. (1974)
- Phanerochaete sanguineocarnosa D.Floudas & Hibbett (2015)
- Phanerochaete sanwicensis Gilb. & Hemmes (2004)
- Phanerochaete sordida (P.Karst.) J.Erikss. & Ryvarden (1978)

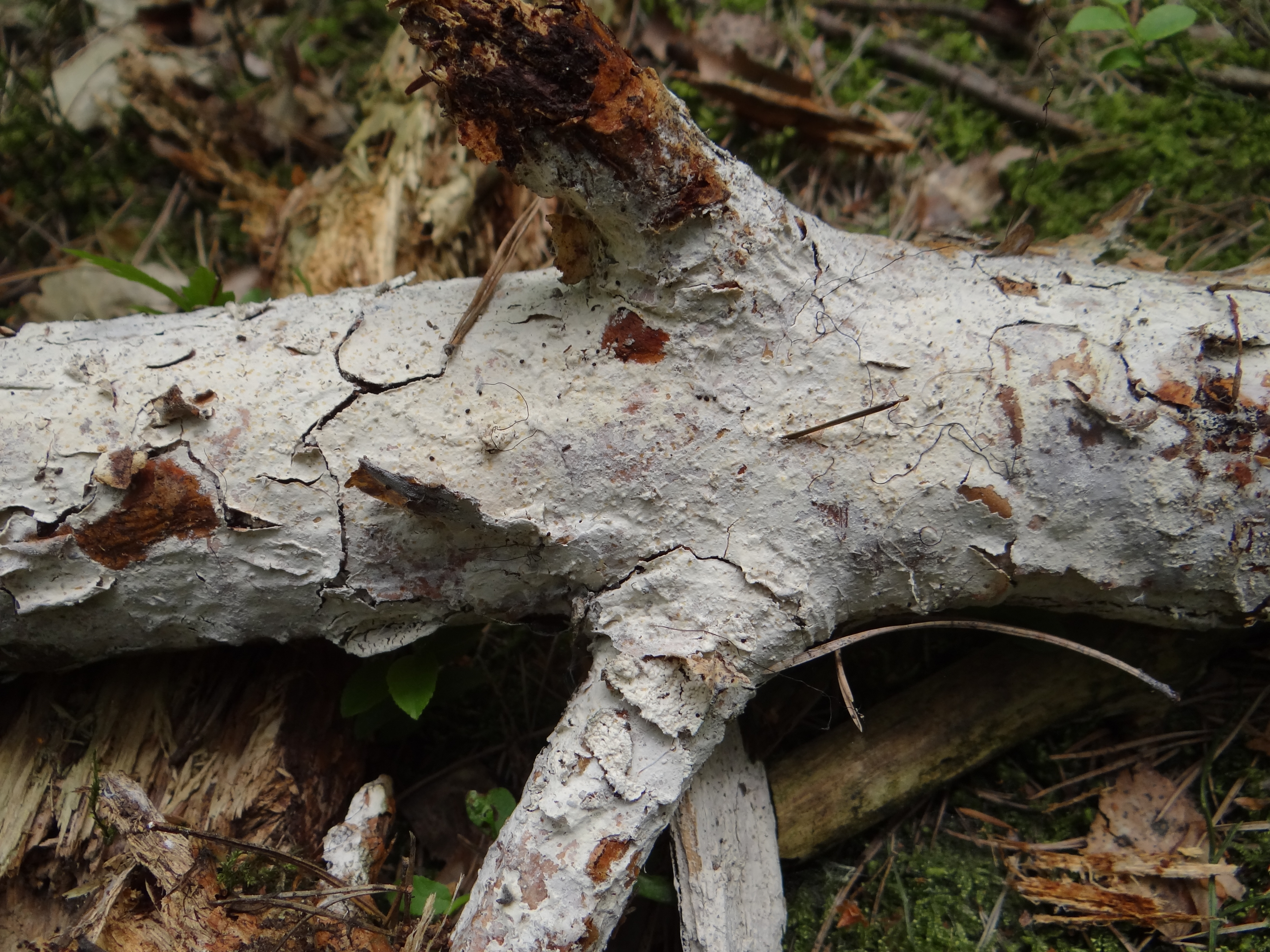
P. sordida

- Phanerochaete stereoides Sheng H.Wu (1995)
- Phanerochaete suballantoidea Sheng H.Wu (1998) – Taiwan
- Phanerochaete subceracea (Burt) Burds. (1985)
- Phanerochaete subcrassispora P.Roberts & Hjortstam (2009)
- Phanerochaete subglobosa Sheng H.Wu (1990)
- Phanerochaete subiculosa (Burt) Burds. (1985)
- Phanerochaete taiwaniana Sheng H.Wu (1990)
- Phanerochaete tamariciphila Boidin, Lanq. & Gilles (1993)
- Phanerochaete thailandica Kout & Sádlíková (2017) – Thailand
- Phanerochaete tropica (Sheng H.Wu) Hjortstam (1995)
- Phanerochaete tuberculascens Hjortstam (2000)
- Phanerochaete tuberculata (P.Karst.) Parmasto (1968)
- Phanerochaete velutina (DC.) P.Karst. (1898)
- Phanerochaete vesiculosa S.Martínez & Nakasone (2005) – Uruguay
- Phanerochaete xerophila Burds. (1985)
