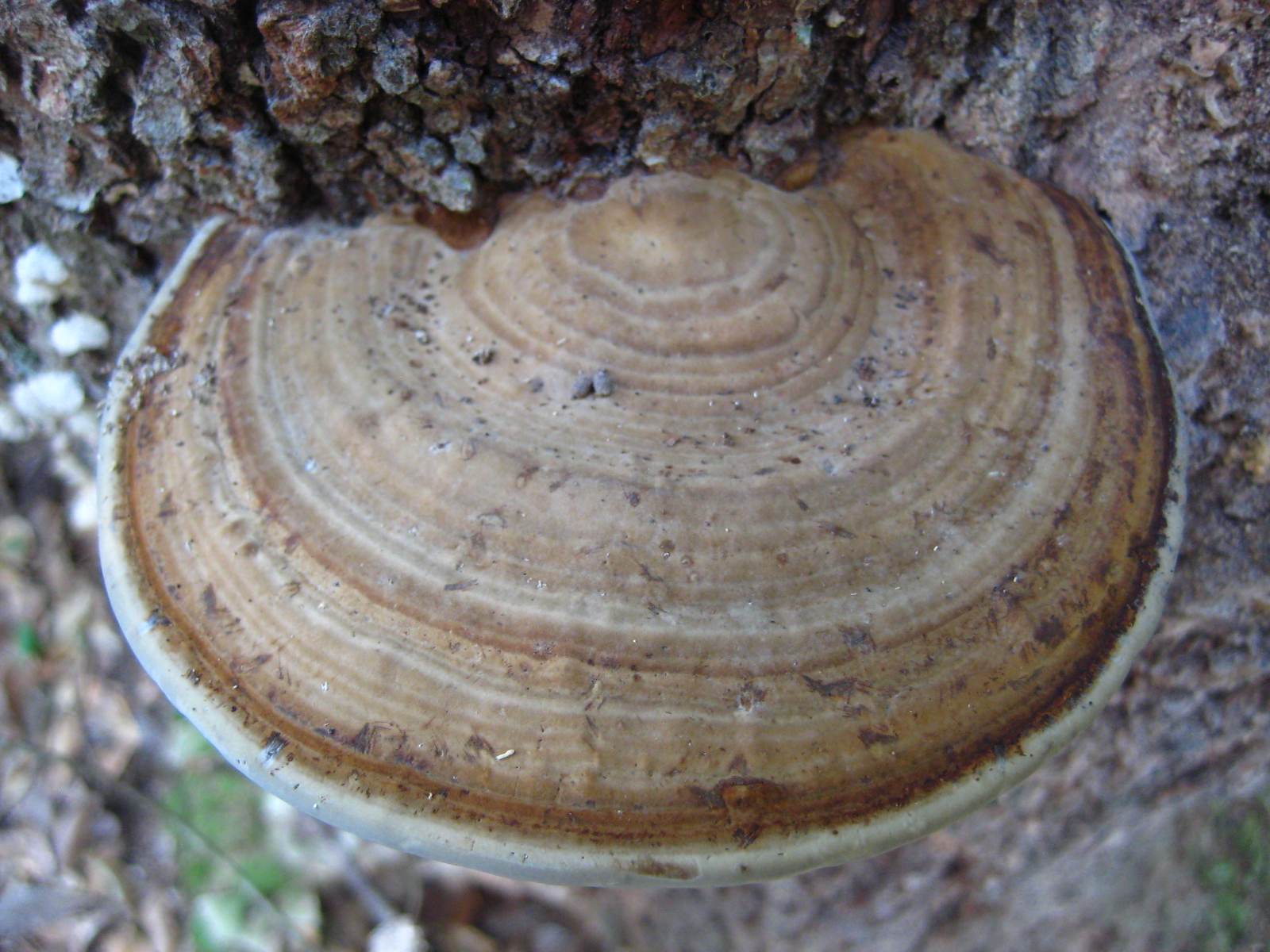

Scientific classification
- Kingdom: Fungi
- Division: Basidiomycota
- Class: Agaricomycetes
- Order: Polyporales
- Family: Polyporaceae
- Genus: Fomes
- Species: F. fasciatus

Binomial name
- Fomes fasciatus (Sw.) Cooke (1885)

Synonyms
- Boletus fasciatus Sw. (1788); Polyporus fasciatus (Sw.) Fr. (1821); "Polyporus sclerodermeus" Lév.(1846); "Polyporus marmoratus" Berk. & M.A. Curtis (1860); Fomes marmoratus (Berk. & M.A. Curtis) Cooke (1885); "Myriadoporus dussii" Pat.(1889); Scindalma fasciatum (Sw.) Kuntze (1898); "Fomes subfomentarius" Romell (1901); Elfvingia fasciata (Sw.) Murrill (1903); Ungulina sclerodermea (Lev.) Pat (1903); Elfvingiella fasciata (Sw.) Murrill (1915)

= Fomes fasciatus =

Species of fungus

Fomes fasciatus
- Mycological characteristics
- Pores on hymenium
- Edibility is inedible

Fomes fasciatus, common name the Southern Clam Shell, is a pathogenic white rot fungus in the family Polyporaceae. It is found in the southeastern United States and Central and South America where it can be seen growing on various dead and living hardwood trees. It was first described by Swedish botanist Olof Swartz in Jamaica in 1788 as Boletus fasciatus. It was later transferred by Cooke to Fomes fasciatus in 1885. The genus name "Fomes" translates to tinder as its holotype was historically used to start fires and the specific epithet "fasciatus" translates to "banded", in reference to the bands of brown to grey and black colors that the top of its fruiting body displays.

F. fasciatus is in the same Genus as the better known Horse Hoof or Tinder Conk fungus Fomes fomentarius (F. excavatus), which was discovered with the 5,000 year old body of Otzi the Iceman in the Italian Alps. It has a similar morphology to F. fomentarius and has likely been confused in identifications given that both species overlap in physical features and variances. Like tinder conk and many other hard bodied wood-decay fungi, it has a trauma layer that can be harvested for tinder or making Amadou.

== Ecology ==
Ecologically F. fasciatus is very similar to Fomes fomentarius. Both are economically important wood-decay fungi found on various hardwood trees and both produce large, woody, clam to hoof shaped conks that contain trimitic hyphae. However, F. fasciatus is largely distributed in tropical zones where as F. fomentarius is found in more temperate regions. F. fasciatus is further distinguished by its smaller spore size and the shape of its fruiting body and pore surface which can be more convex whereas F. fomentarius tends to be more ungulate (hoof shaped) and displays more vertical growth. However these physical features can vary greatly depending on environmental factors like host, temperature and elevation.

== Distribution ==
F. fasciatus maintains a subtropical to southern hemisphere distribution where it has been documented as far north as the coastal plains of North Carolina and as far south as southern South America. Specimens have also been documented in Australia, southern Asia and Indonesia. In North America the fungus is commonly found on host trees like hackberry, hickory, maple, and oak but has been recorded on at least ten genera worldwide where it contributes to the loss of commercially viable wood.

== Research ==
Though the morphological differences are apparent, in some cases distinguishing F. fasciatus from F. fomentarius can be challenging and recent phylogenetic research provided more data to distinguish the genetic differences between the two species. The research showed that “the two species share less than 88% maximum identity for the ITS region” (McCormick, Grand, Post, Cubeta, 2013, p. 1524). Though it's clear that the two species have different temperature preferences for optimal growth, the research went on to postulate that mean temperatures might also affect other morphological features that distinguish these two species.

Fomes fasciatus has also been researched as a potential cheap biosorbent of heavy metals due to its common occurrence and lack of current economic use. The research evaluated the dried and pulverized fruiting bodies ability to absorb Cu II (copper compounds) commonly found in wastewater and found that treating the prepared fungi with hot-alkali improved its sorbent properties.

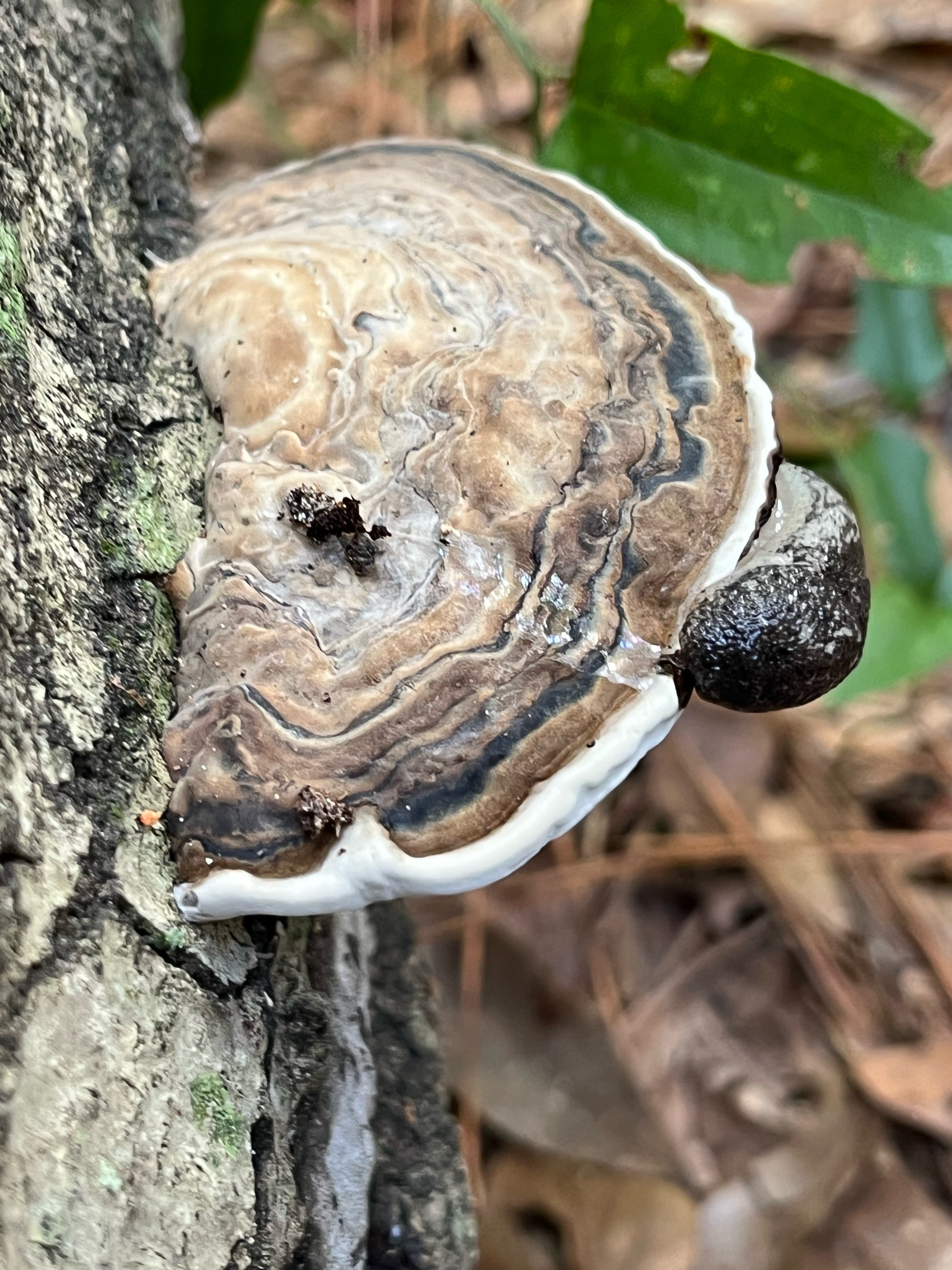
The Southern Clam Shell showing its common form in the southeast United States.

== Description ==
Growing on living and dead broad-leaf hardwood trees.

The body is sessile, semicircular clam shaped, 7-18 cm wide with a flat to convex poor surface on the bottom.

The top of the fruiting body has concentric zones of gray, brown or black. It is finely tomentose when young becoming hard and smooth in age.

The flesh can be up to 4 cm thick at the base with a golden brown color.

Pores are circular, 4-5 per mm, white when young, turning to brown with age, staining dark brown.

The spores are cylindrical, smooth, hyaline, inamyloid, 10-14 x 4-5 μm.

== See also ==
- List of Platanus diseases
- List of sweetgum diseases
