= Phlebia subceracea =

Scientific classification
- Kingdom: Fungi
- Division: Basidiomycota
- Class: Agaricomycetes
- Order: Polyporales
- Family: Meruliaceae
- Genus: Phlebia
- Species: P. subceracea

Binomial name
- Phlebia subceracea (Litsch.) Nakasone

Species of fungus

Phlebia subceracea is a species of crust fungus in the family Meruliaceae. It forms thin, spreading fruiting bodies on decaying wood and is associated with wood decay in forest ecosystems.

== Description ==
Phlebia subceracea produces resupinate fruiting bodies that spread flat across wood surfaces. The surface is smooth to slightly wrinkled and pale cream to yellowish in colour. Like many species in the genus, it has a soft, waxy appearance when fresh.

== Range ==
The species has been recorded from Europe, Asia, and North America.

== Habitat ==
It grows on decaying wood in forests, especially on fallen branches and logs of hardwood trees.

== Ecology ==
Phlebia subceracea is a saprotrophic fungus that contributes to the decomposition of dead wood. It is associated with white rot, breaking down lignin and cellulose in woody material.

== Etymology ==
The genus name Phlebia refers to the vein-like or wrinkled appearance of the fruiting surface found in many species of the genus. The specific epithet subceracea refers to the somewhat waxy texture of the fungus.

== Taxonomy ==
The species was originally described by Viktor Litschauer and was later transferred to the genus Phlebia by mycologist Karen K. Nakasone.
