= Phanerochaete allantospora =

Scientific classification
- Kingdom: Fungi
- Division: Basidiomycota
- Class: Agaricomycetes
- Order: Polyporales
- Family: Phanerochaetaceae
- Genus: Phanerochaete
- Species: P. allantospora

Binomial name
- Phanerochaete allantospora Burds. & Gilb. (1974)

Synonyms
- Grandiniella allantospora (Burds. & Gilb.) Burds. (1977)

Species of fungus

Phanerochaete allantospora is a plant pathogen infecting Platanus species.
