= Stigmina platani =

Scientific classification
- Kingdom: Fungi
- Division: Ascomycota
- Class: Dothideomycetes
- Order: Capnodiales
- Family: Mycosphaerellaceae
- Genus: Stigmina
- Species: S. platani

Binomial name
- Stigmina platani (Fuckel) Sacc., (1880)

Synonyms
- Clasterosporium sticticum (Berk. & M.A. Curtis) Sacc., (1886); Sciniatosporium platani (Fuckel) Morgan-Jones, (1971); Sporidesmium sticticum Berk. & M.A. Curtis, (1874); Sporocadus platani (Fuckel) Arx, (1981); Stigmella platani Fuckel, (1871); Stigmella visianica Sacc., (1878); Stigmina stictica (Berk. & M.A. Curtis) Pound & Clem.,(1896); Stigmina visianica (Sacc.) Sacc., (1880)

Species of fungus

Stigmina platani is a plant pathogen infecting plane trees.
