= Phloeospora multimaculans =

Scientific classification
- Kingdom: Fungi
- Division: Ascomycota
- Class: Dothideomycetes
- Order: Mycosphaerellales
- Family: Mycosphaerellaceae
- Genus: Phloeospora
- Species: P. multimaculans

Binomial name
- Phloeospora multimaculans Heald & F.A. Wolf

Species of fungus

Phloeospora multimaculans is a fungal plant pathogen infecting plane trees.
