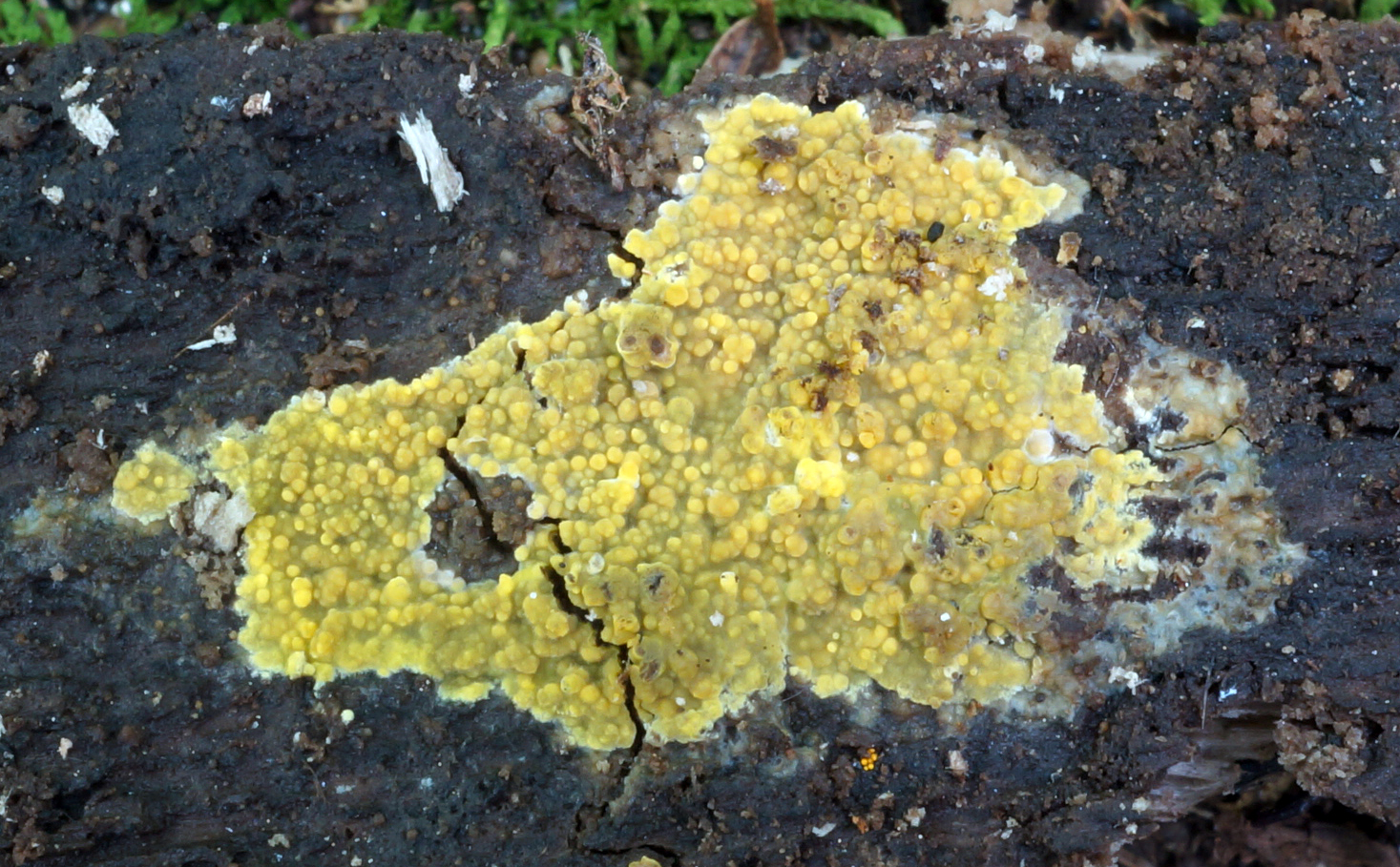

Scientific classification
- Domain: Eukaryota
- Kingdom: Fungi
- Division: Basidiomycota
- Class: Agaricomycetes
- Order: Polyporales
- Family: Meruliaceae
- Genus: Phlebia
- Species: P. subochracea

Binomial name
- Phlebia subochracea (Alb. & Schwein.) J.Erikss. & Ryvarden (1976)

Synonyms
- Acia membranacea subsp. subochracea (Alb. & Schwein.) Bourdot & Galzin (1914); Acia subochracea (Alb. & Schwein.) Bourdot & Galzin (1928); Grandinia subochracea (Alb. & Schwein.) Bres. (1894); Lilaceophlebia subochracea (Alb. & Schwein.) Spirin & Zmitr. (2004); Mycoacia subochracea (Alb. & Schwein.) Parmasto (1967); Peniophora danica M.P.Christ. (1956); Phlebia danica (M.P.Christ.) M.P.Christ. (1960); Sarcodontia subochracea (Alb. & Schwein.) Nikol. (1961); Thelephora granulosa var. subochracea Alb. & Schwein. (1805)

= Phlebia subochracea =

Species of fungus

Phlebia subochracea is a fungal plant pathogen.
