= Leptographium microsporum =

Scientific classification
- Kingdom: Fungi
- Division: Ascomycota
- Class: Sordariomycetes
- Order: Ophiostomatales
- Family: Ophiostomataceae
- Genus: Leptographium
- Species: L. microsporum

Binomial name
- Leptographium microsporum R.W.Davidson (1935)

Species of fungus

Leptographium microsporum is a species of fungus in the family Ophiostomataceae. It is a plant pathogen.
