= Septoria liquidambaris =

Scientific classification
- Domain: Eukaryota
- Kingdom: Fungi
- Division: Ascomycota
- Class: Dothideomycetes
- Order: Capnodiales
- Family: Mycosphaerellaceae
- Genus: Septoria
- Species: S. liquidambaris

Binomial name
- Septoria liquidambaris Cooke & Ellis

Septoria liquidambaris is a fungal plant pathogen infecting sweetgum trees.
