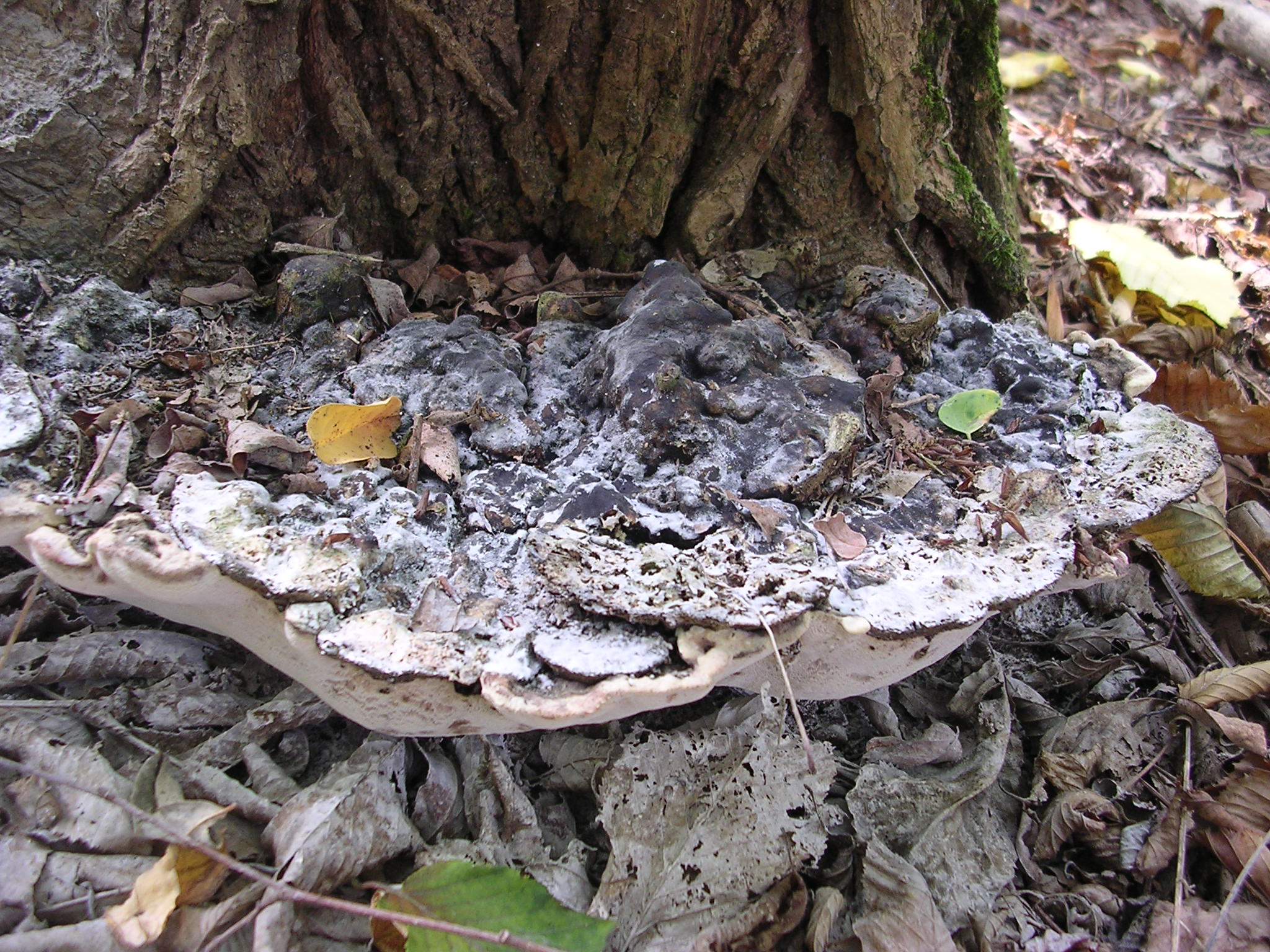

Scientific classification
- Domain: Eukaryota
- Kingdom: Fungi
- Division: Basidiomycota
- Class: Agaricomycetes
- Order: Polyporales
- Family: Polyporaceae
- Genus: Vanderbylia
- Species: V. fraxinea

Binomial name
- Vanderbylia fraxinea (Bull.) D.A. Reid (1973)

Synonyms
- List: Boletus fraxineus Bull. (1790); Polyporus fraxineus (Bull.) Fr. (1821); Trametes fraxinea (Bull.) P. Karst. (1882); Fomes fraxineus (Bull.) Cooke (1885); Placodes fraxineus (Bull.) Quél. (1886); Ischnoderma fraxineum (Bull.) P. Karst. (1889); Scindalma fraxineum (Bull.) Kuntze (1898); Ungulina fraxinea (Bull.) Bourdot & Galzin (1925); Perenniporia fraxinea (Bull.) Ryvarden (1978); Haploporus fraxineus (Bull.) Bondartseva (1983); Poria fraxinea (Bull.) Ginns (1984); Fomitella fraxinea (Bull.) Imazeki (1989); Polystictoides leucomelas Lázaro Ibiza (1916); Polystictus leucomelas (Lázaro Ibiza) Sacc. & Trotter (1925); Fomes ganodermicus Lázaro Ibiza (1916); Ungulina fraxinea var. albida Bourdot (1933)

= Vanderbylia fraxinea =

Species of fungus

Vanderbylia fraxinea is a species of poroid fungus in the family Polyporaceae. It is a plant pathogen infecting ash trees.

== See also ==
- List of sweetgum diseases
