= Tyromyces calkinsii =

Scientific classification
- Kingdom: Fungi
- Division: Basidiomycota
- Class: Agaricomycetes
- Order: Polyporales
- Family: Incrustoporiaceae
- Genus: Tyromyces
- Species: T. calkinsii

Binomial name
- Tyromyces calkinsii Murrill (1907)

Species of fungus

Tyromyces calkinsii is a plant pathogen infecting sweetgums.
