= Phanerochaete arizonica =

Scientific classification
- Kingdom: Fungi
- Division: Basidiomycota
- Class: Agaricomycetes
- Order: Polyporales
- Family: Phanerochaetaceae
- Genus: Phanerochaete
- Species: P. arizonica

Binomial name
- Phanerochaete arizonica Burds. & Gilb. (1974)

Synonyms
- Grandiniella arizonica (Burds. & Gilb.) Burds. (1977)

Species of fungus

Phanerochaete arizonica is a species of fungus. It is a plant pathogen that infects Platanus species. Due to some uncertainty in its phylogenetic placement, it is also sometimes referred to as Grandiniella arizonica
