= Stigmina liquidambaris =

Scientific classification
- Kingdom: Fungi
- Division: Ascomycota
- Class: Dothideomycetes
- Order: Capnodiales
- Family: Mycosphaerellaceae
- Genus: Stigmina
- Species: S. liquidambaris

Binomial name
- Stigmina liquidambaris (Tharp) E.B.G.Jones & W.B.Kendr. (1972)

Synonyms
- Exosporium liquidambaris Tharp (1917)

Species of fungus

Stigmina liquidambaris is a fungal plant pathogen infecting sweetgum trees.
