= Phanerochaete burtii =

Scientific classification
- Kingdom: Fungi
- Division: Basidiomycota
- Class: Agaricomycetes
- Order: Polyporales
- Family: Phanerochaetaceae
- Genus: Phanerochaete
- Species: P. burtii

Binomial name
- Phanerochaete burtii (Romell ex Burt) Parmasto (1967)

Synonyms
- Corticium lloydii Nakasone (2008); Grandiniella burtii (Romell) Burds. (1977); Peniophora burtii Romell ex Burt (1926)

Species of fungus

Phanerochaete burtii is a species of fungus in the family Phanerochaetaceae, presenting a thin, resupinate crust fungus with a smooth, pale orange to greyish-orange surface that becomes strongly cracked, exposing a white interior, with loosely attached hyphal strands along the margins.

The fungus is a plant pathogen that infects plane trees.

In 2008, Nakasone concluded that samples of Corticium lloydii represent the same species, with the correct modern name being Phanerochaete burtii.
