= Phanerochaete avellanea =

Scientific classification
- Kingdom: Fungi
- Division: Basidiomycota
- Class: Agaricomycetes
- Order: Polyporales
- Family: Phanerochaetaceae
- Genus: Phanerochaete
- Species: P. avellanea

Binomial name
- Phanerochaete avellanea (Bres.) J.Erikss. & Hjortstam (1981)

Synonyms
- Corticium avellaneum Bres. (1911); Corticium lacteum subsp. avellaneum (Bres.) Bourdot & Galzin (1928); Corticium lacteum var. schidacodes Bourdot & Galzin (1928); Corticium tuberculatum var. schidacodes (Bourdot & Galzin) D.A.Reid (1968); Efibula avellanea (Bres.) Sheng H.Wu (1990)

Species of fungus

Phanerochaete avellanea is a species of fungus in the family Phanerochaetaceae. It has been reported from Platanus trees as a plant pathogen and was identified in molecular phylogenetic studies as falling outside the core Phanerochaete clade as traditionally circumscribed.
