= Phanerochaete carnosa =

Scientific classification
- Domain: Eukaryota
- Kingdom: Fungi
- Division: Basidiomycota
- Class: Agaricomycetes
- Order: Polyporales
- Family: Phanerochaetaceae
- Genus: Phanerochaete
- Species: P. carnosa

Binomial name
- Phanerochaete carnosa (Burt) Parmasto (1967)

Synonyms
- Peniophora carnosa Burt (1926); Membranicium carnosum (Burt) Y.Hayashi (1974); Grandiniella carnosa (Burt) Burds. (1977); Leptochaete carnosa (Burt) Zmitr. & Spirin (2006)

Species of fungus

Phanerochaete carnosa is a species of crust fungus in the family Phanerochaetaceae. It is a plant pathogen that infects plane trees. The fungus was first described to science by Edward Angus Burt in 1926 as a species of Peniophora. It was transferred to the genus Phanerochaete by Erast Parmasto in 1967.
