= Stigmina (fungus) =

Scientific classification
- Kingdom: Fungi
- Division: Ascomycota
- Class: Dothideomycetes
- Order: Capnodiales
- Family: Mycosphaerellaceae
- Genus: Stigmina; Sacc. (1880)

Type species
- Stigmina platani (Fuckel) Sacc. (1880)

Species
- See text

Genus of fungi

Stigmina is a genus of fungal plant pathogens in the family Mycosphaerellaceae.

== Species ==
As of January 2024, Species Fungorum (in the Catalogue of Life) accept 83 species of Stigmina.

- Stigmina ahmadii B.Sutton (1973)
- Stigmina anacardii (Syd.) M.B.Ellis (1959)
- Stigmina angusiana M.B.Ellis (1963)
- Stigmina ardisiae Munjal & Kulshr. (1968)
- Stigmina artocarpi Thaung (1975)
- Stigmina asperula (Lombard & R.W.Davidson) B.Sutton (1975)
- Stigmina asperulata Hol.-Jech. (1984)
- Stigmina bahraichiae A.K.Singh & Kamal (1985)
- Stigmina bambusae A.W.Subhedar & V.G.Rao (1975)
- Stigmina butyrospermi (Hansf.) M.B.Ellis (1967)
- Stigmina cactivora (Petr. & Cif.) M.B.Ellis (1963)
- Stigmina caffra (Wakef.) M.B.Ellis (1959)
- Stigmina careyae Thaung (1975)
- Stigmina carpophila (Lév.) M.B.Ellis (1959)
- Stigmina celastri (Kalchbr.) M.B.Ellis (1959)
- Stigmina celata (Welw. & Curr.) M.B.Ellis (1967)
- Stigmina clusiae M.B.Ellis (1963)
- Stigmina cocculi Crous & U.Braun (1996)
- Stigmina cornicola (Ellis & Everh.) B.Sutton (1975)
- Stigmina crossopterygis M.B.Ellis (1959)
- Stigmina curvispora Crous & U.Braun (1994)
- Stigmina cycadicola (Thirum.) M.B.Ellis (1959)
- Stigmina cycadina Tilak & R.Rao (1964)
- Stigmina cytisi (Hollós) U.Braun (1993)
- Stigmina deflectens (P.Karst.) M.B.Ellis (1959)
- Stigmina dehradunensis M.D.Mehrotra (1992)
- Stigmina dendrocalami M.S.Patil & Thite (1977)
- Stigmina desertorum (Melnik) B.Sutton (1978)
- Stigmina dieramae Crous & B.Sutton (1997)
- Stigmina doliolioides (Sousa da Câmara) B.Sutton (1975)
- Stigmina dothideoides (Ellis & Everh.) M.B.Ellis (1959)
- Stigmina dura (Sacc.) S.Hughes (1958)
- Stigmina elaeagni M.B.Ellis (1961)
- Stigmina ellisiana B.Sutton (1972)
- Stigmina ellisii M.B.Ellis (1959)
- Stigmina erythrinae M.B.Ellis (1963)
- Stigmina erythrinicola Thaung (1976)
- Stigmina esfandiarii Petr. (1950)
- Stigmina eucalypticola B.Sutton & Pascoe (1989)
- Stigmina eucalyptorum Crous & T.A.Cout. (1998)
- Stigmina fici Pavgi & U.P.Singh (1966)
- Stigmina glomerulosa (Sacc.) S.Hughes (1958)
- Stigmina hansfordii B.Sutton & Pascoe (1989)
- Stigmina hartigiana (Sacc.) M.B.Ellis (1959)
- Stigmina henningsiana (Sacc.) Bat. (1966)
- Stigmina hippophaes Žukov (1979)
- Stigmina inconspicua B.Sutton & Pascoe (1989)
- Stigmina knoxdaviesii Crous & U.Braun (1996)
- Stigmina kosaroffii (Briosi) B.Sutton (1972)
- Stigmina koyanensis Rashmi Dubey & S.Sengupta (2016)
- Stigmina lautii B.Sutton (1973)
- Stigmina lavrensis (Viégas) M.B.Ellis (1963)
- Stigmina laxuspora R.F.Castañeda & W.B.Kendr. (1990)
- Stigmina leptadeniae Thaung (1975)
- Stigmina liquidambaris (Tharp) E.B.G.Jones & W.B.Kendr. (1972)
- Stigmina lycii (Kalchbr.) B.Sutton (1972)
- Stigmina millettiae M.B.Ellis (1972)
- Stigmina niesslii (Morgan-Jones) B.Sutton (1972)
- Stigmina obtecta (Petr. & Esfand.) M.B.Ellis (1967)
- Stigmina pallida (Ellis & Everh.) M.B.Ellis (1963)
- Stigmina parrotiae (S.Ahmad) B.Sutton (1972)
- Stigmina phyllanthi M.B.Ellis (1959)
- Stigmina platani-racemosae (Dearn. & Barthol.) S.Hughes (1952)
- Stigmina populi Pound & Clem. (1896)
- Stigmina pulvinata (Kunze) M.B.Ellis (1959)
- Stigmina pulviniformis (Syd. & P.Syd.) S.Hughes (1952)
- Stigmina pusilla (P.Karst.) S.Hughes (1958)
- Stigmina rauvolfiae M.B.Ellis (1976)
- Stigmina rhois Crous & U.Braun (1994)
- Stigmina sambucina (Ellis & Everh.) B.Sutton (1972)
- Stigmina sapii (I.Miyake) M.B.Ellis (1967)
- Stigmina sigmoidea Matsush. (1995)
- Stigmina sphaerioides (Ellis & Everh.) U.Braun (1993)
- Stigmina sycina (Thüm.) B.Sutton (1972)
- Stigmina tamarindi (Syd. & P.Syd.) Morgan-Jones & W.B.Kendr. (1972)
- Stigmina tephrosiae Agnihothr. (1962)
- Stigmina terminaliae Munjal & Kulshr. (1968)
- Stigmina tharpii Morgan-Jones & W.B.Kendr. (1972)
- Stigmina thermopsidis Harkn. (1884)
- Stigmina tubakii N.D.Sharma (1980)
- Stigmina ulei (Syd. & P.Syd.) B.Sutton (1972)
- Stigmina utahensis (Sacc.) B.Sutton (1972)
- Stigmina verrucosa (Morgan-Jones) B.Sutton (1972)
