= Helicoma muelleri =

Scientific classification
- Kingdom: Fungi
- Division: Ascomycota
- Class: Dothideomycetes
- Order: Tubeufiales
- Family: Tubeufiaceae
- Genus: Helicoma
- Species: H. muelleri

Binomial name
- Helicoma muelleri Corda (1837)

Synonyms
- Helicosporium muelleri (Corda) Sacc.

Species of fungus

Helicoma muelleri is a fungal plant pathogen.
