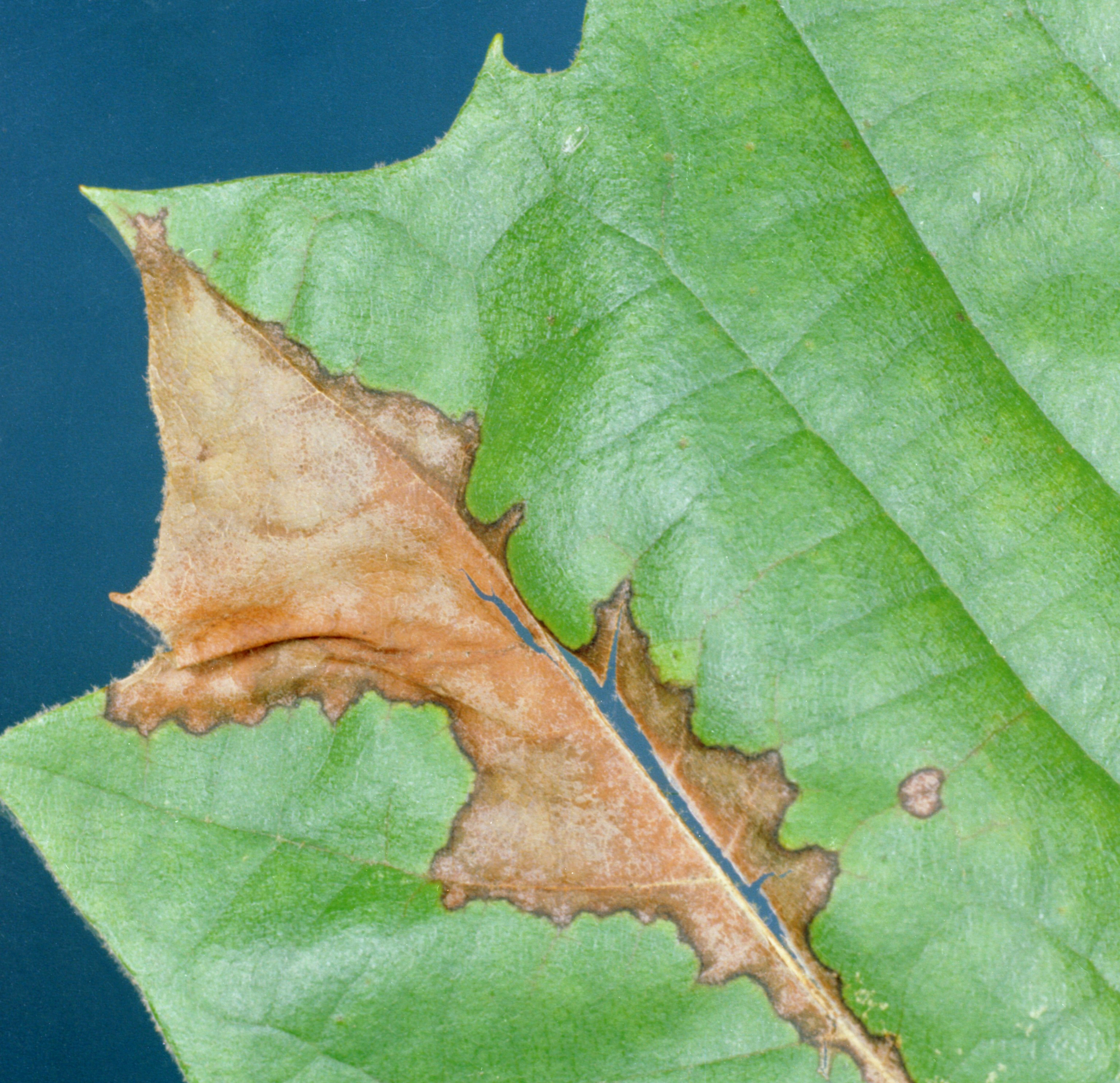
- Symptoms of Apiognomonia veneta on Sycamore foliage

Scientific classification
- Kingdom: Fungi
- Division: Ascomycota
- Class: Sordariomycetes
- Order: Diaporthales
- Family: Gnomoniaceae
- Genus: Apiognomonia
- Species: A. veneta

Binomial name
- Apiognomonia veneta (Sacc. & Speg.) Höhn., (1920)

Synonyms
- Apiosporopsis veneta Diaporthe veneta Discella platani Discula nervisequa Discula platani Fusarium nervisequum Fusarium nervisequum f. platani Fusarium platani Gloeosporidina platani Gloeosporium nervisequum Gloeosporium platani Gnomonia platani Gnomonia veneta Hymenula platani Myxosporina platani Placosphaeria platani Sporonema platani

= Apiognomonia veneta =

Species of fungus

Apiognomonia veneta is a plant pathogen which causes anthracnose on London Plane trees.

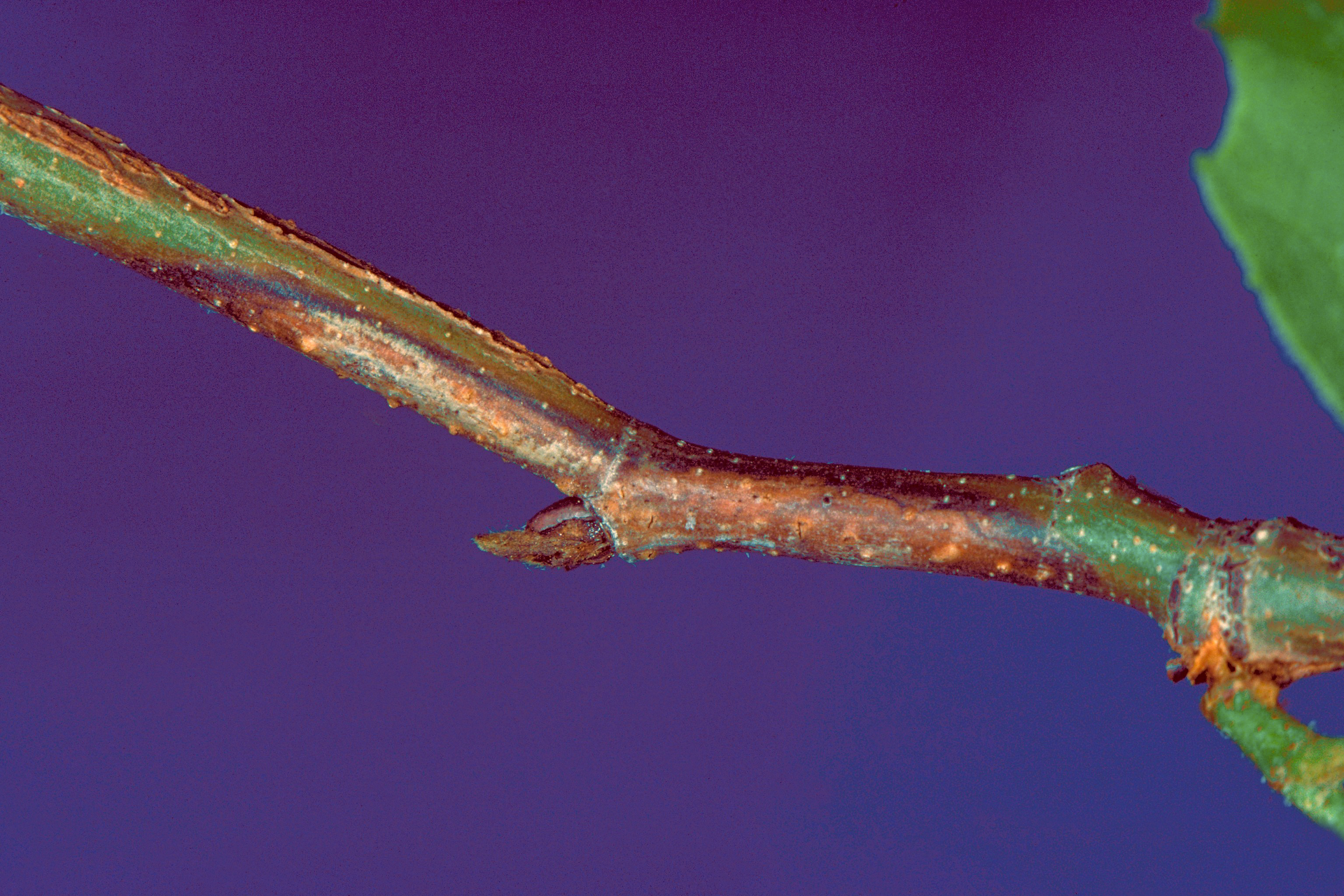
Symptoms on a twig
