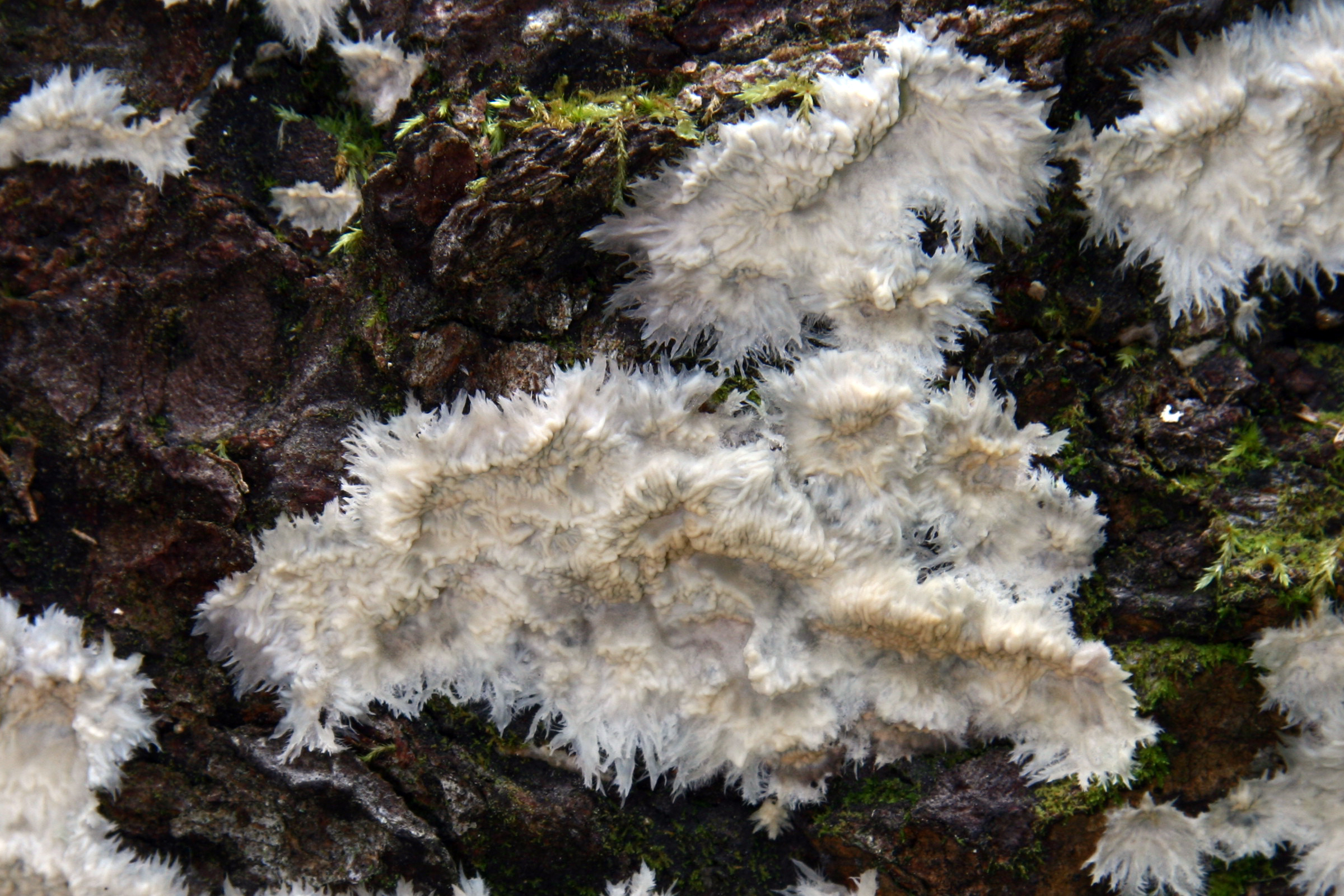

Scientific classification
- Domain: Eukaryota
- Kingdom: Fungi
- Division: Basidiomycota
- Class: Agaricomycetes
- Order: Polyporales
- Family: Meruliaceae
- Genus: Phlebia
- Species: P. centrifuga

Binomial name
- Phlebia centrifuga P.Karst. (1881)

Synonyms
- Lilaceophlebia centrifuga (P.Karst.) Spirin & Zmitr. (2004); Phlebia mellea Overh. (1930); Phlebia macra Litsch. (1934); Phlebia macra f. roseomarginata Pilát (1938); Phlebia macra var. roseoinhalata Pilát (1938); Phlebia subalbida W.B.Cooke (1956)

= Phlebia centrifuga =

Species of fungus

Phlebia centrifuga Mycological characteristics
- Smooth hymenium
- Hymenium attachment is irregular or not applicable
- Lacks a stipe
- Ecology is saprotrophic
- Edibility is unknown

Phlebia centrifuga is a species of crust fungus in the family Meruliaceae. It was described in 1881 by Petter Karsten.
