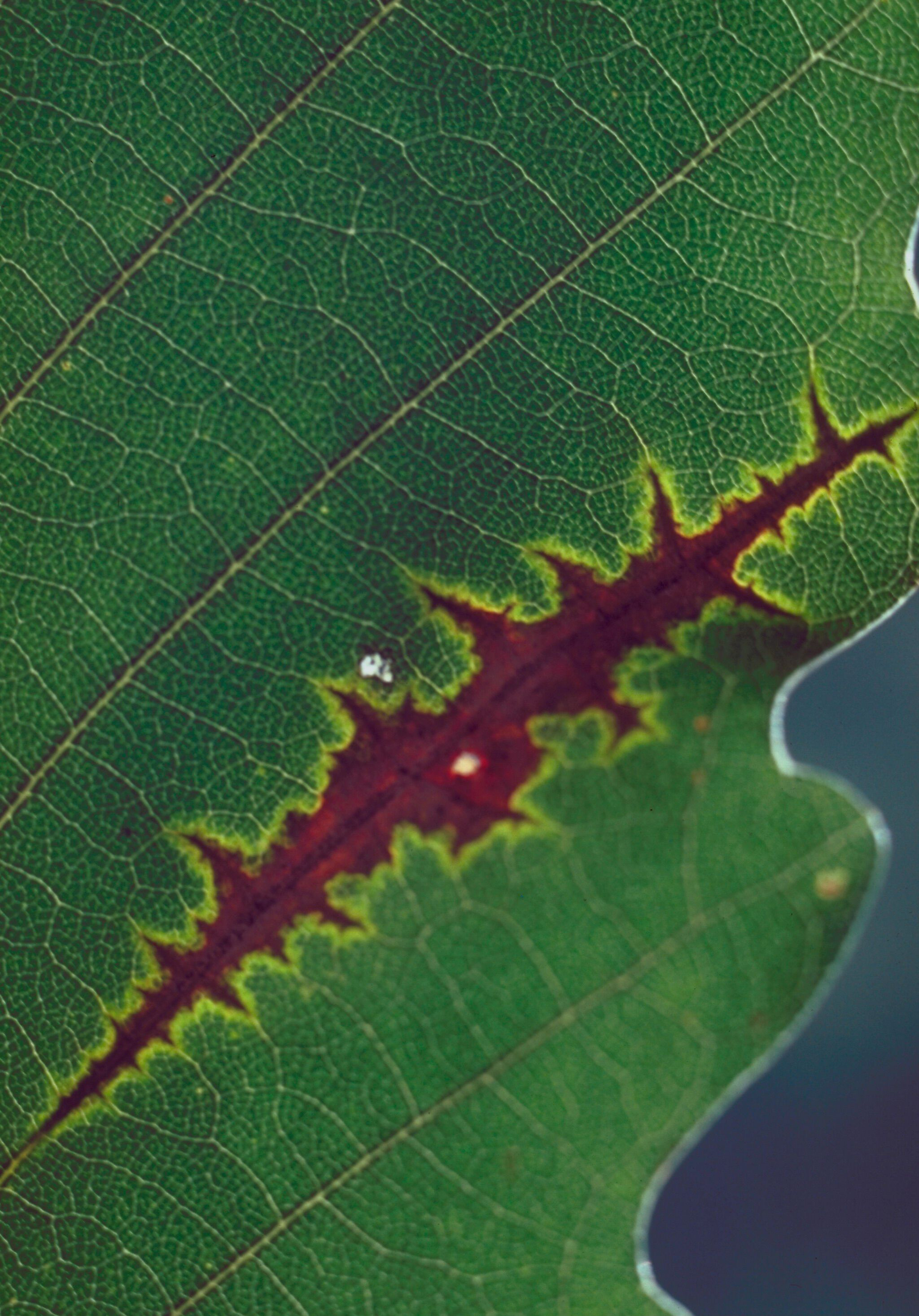
- Symptoms on an oak leaf

Scientific classification
- Kingdom: Fungi
- Division: Ascomycota
- Class: Sordariomycetes
- Order: Diaporthales
- Family: Gnomoniaceae
- Genus: Apiognomonia
- Species: A. errabunda

Binomial name
- Apiognomonia errabunda (Roberge ex Desm.) Höhn., (1918)

Synonyms
- Apiognomonia quercina Apiognomonia tiliae Discula quercina Discula umbrinella Gloeosporidium tiliae Gloeosporidium umbrinellum Gloeosporium fagi Gloeosporium fagi Gloeosporium quercinum Gloeosporium tiliae Gloeosporium umbrinellum Gnomonia errabunda Gnomonia quercina Gnomonia tiliae Gnomonia veneta Labrella fagi Laestadia veneta Myxosporina fagi Myxosporina quercina Myxosporina tiliae Sphaeria errabunda

= Apiognomonia errabunda =

Species of fungus

Apiognomonia errabunda is a fungal plant pathogen and causal agent of oak anthracnose. It is one of the most widespread leaf-associated fungi in the northern temperate zone and is found mostly on oak, beech, and linden trees.
