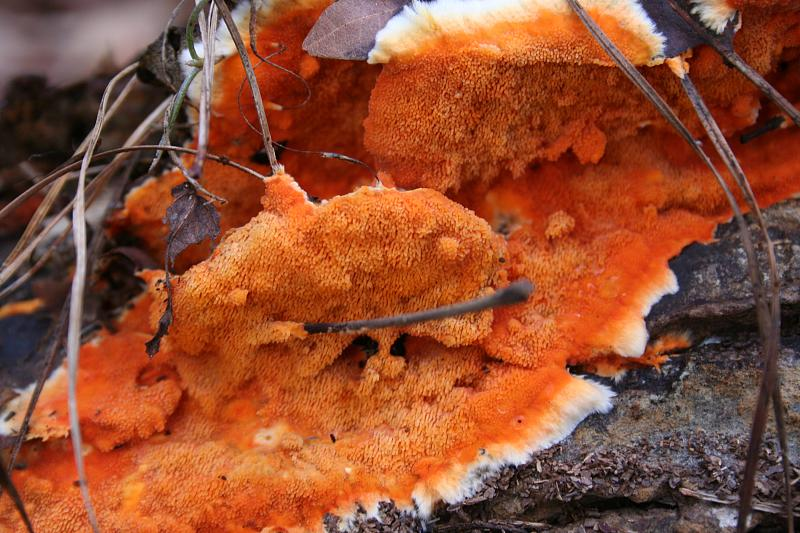

Scientific classification
- Kingdom: Fungi
- Division: Basidiomycota
- Class: Agaricomycetes
- Order: Polyporales
- Family: Meruliaceae
- Genus: Hydnophlebia
- Species: H. chrysorhiza

Binomial name
- Hydnophlebia chrysorhiza (Eaton) Parmasto (1967)

Synonyms
- Grandiniella chrysorhizon (Eaton) Burds. (1977); Hydnum chrysorhizon Eaton (1822); Mycoacia chrysorhiza (Eaton) Aoshima & H. Furuk. (1966); Oxydontia chrysorhiza (Eaton) D.P. Rogers & G.W. Martin (1958) Phanerochaete chrysorhizon (Eaton) Budington & Gilb., (1973)

= Hydnophlebia chrysorhiza =

Species of fungus

Hydnophlebia chrysorhiza, also known as Phanerochaete chrysorhizon, is a species of crust fungus in family Meruliaceae.

== Taxonomy ==
The taxon was originally described as Hydnum chrysorhizum by Amos Eaton in 1817. It is the type species of the genus Hydnophlebia.

== Description ==
It is a white rot organism infecting dead deciduous trees. The orange crust grows up to 5 centimetres (2 in) wide. Similar species include H. omnivora, Ceriporia spissa, Phlebia coccineofulva, Steccherinum ochraceum, and Xenasmatella vaga.

== Distribution ==
It can be found in eastern North America from July to November.
