= Merulius berkeleyi =

Scientific classification
- Kingdom: Fungi
- Division: Basidiomycota
- Class: Agaricomycetes
- Order: Polyporales
- Family: Meruliaceae
- Genus: Merulius
- Species: M. berkeleyi

Binomial name
- Merulius berkeleyi Kuntze (1891)

Synonyms
- Cantharellus elegans (Berk.) & Broome (1875)

Species of fungus

Merulius berkeleyi is a species of fungus in the family Meruliaceae. It is found in Sri Lanka.
