= Uncobasidium luteolum =

Scientific classification
- Kingdom: Fungi
- Division: Basidiomycota
- Class: Agaricomycetes
- Order: Polyporales
- Family: Meruliaceae
- Genus: Uncobasidium
- Species: U. luteolum

Binomial name
- Uncobasidium luteolum Hjortstam & Ryvarden (1978)

Synonyms
- Cerocorticium luteolum (Hjortstam & Ryvarden) Tellería (1985)

Species of fungus

Uncobasidium luteolum is a species of crust fungus in the family Meruliaceae, and the type species of genus Uncobasidium. The holotype was collected in Øvre Dividal National Park, in Målselv Municipality (Norway), where it was growing on Salix. The fungus has a monomitic hyphal system, with individual hyphae measuring 2.5–4 μm and having a clamp connection and oily refractive contents. The basidia are four-sterigmate, measure 30–50 by 8 μm, and feature a hook-shaped protuberance. Its spores are ellipsoid to obovate in shape, measuring 9 by 6 μm. Uncobasidium roseocremeum, found in South America, differs microscopically from U. luteolum in its larger, spherical spores, and the presence of encrusted hyphidia.
