= Scopuloides magnicystidiata =

Scientific classification
- Kingdom: Fungi
- Division: Basidiomycota
- Class: Agaricomycetes
- Order: Polyporales
- Family: Meruliaceae
- Genus: Scopuloides
- Species: S. magnicystidiata

Binomial name
- Scopuloides magnicystidiata Gilb. & Nakasone (2003)

Species of fungus

Scopuloides magnicystidiata is a species of crust fungus in the family Meruliaceae. This white rot species was described as new to science in 2003 by mycologists Robert Lee Gilbertson and Karen Nakasone. The type specimen was discovered growing on Cattley guava (Psidium cattleianum) in the South Hilo district of Hawaii. It has also been recorded in the Kalopa State Recreation Area growing on ironwood, and also on guava in Waipio Valley. The fungus is named for its prominent cystidia, which can be seen with a hand lens. A defining macroscopic characteristic is the translucent look of the fruit body when fresh, and its horny, brittle texture when dried.
