= Mycoacia rubiginosa =

Scientific classification
- Domain: Eukaryota
- Kingdom: Fungi
- Division: Basidiomycota
- Class: Agaricomycetes
- Order: Polyporales
- Family: Meruliaceae
- Genus: Mycoacia
- Species: M. rubiginosa

Binomial name
- Mycoacia rubiginosa Hjortstam & Ryvarden (2004)

Species of fungus

Mycoacia rubiginosa is a species of toothed crust fungus in the family Meruliaceae. It was described as a new species in 2004 by mycologists Kurt Hjortstam and Leif Ryvarden. The type collection was made in Sierra Nevada de Santa Marta, in Magdalena, Colombia, where the fungus was found growing on dead hardwood. It is known only from the type locality. Fruit bodies of M. rubiginosa are distinguished by their reddish colour, and spines up to 3 mm (0.12 in) long. The hyphal system is monomitic, containing only generative hyphae. The spores are ellipsoid, smooth, thin-walled and translucent, with dimensions of 4–4.5 by 2.5–2.75 μm.
