= Mycoleptodonoides sharmae =

Scientific classification
- Kingdom: Fungi
- Division: Basidiomycota
- Class: Agaricomycetes
- Order: Polyporales
- Family: Meruliaceae
- Genus: Mycoleptodonoides
- Species: M. sharmae

Binomial name
- Mycoleptodonoides sharmae K.Das, Stalpers & Stielow (2013)

Species of fungus

Mycoleptodonoides sharmae is a species of tooth fungus in the family Meruliaceae. It was described as new to science in 2013 by mycologists Kanad Das, Joost Stalpers, and J. Benjamin Stielow. The specific epithet sharmae honours Jai Ram Sharma, "for his contribution to the Indian mycobiota". The type collection was made in Shingba Rhododendron Sanctuary, a nature park in Sikkim, India. The fungus was found fruiting on a decaying tree trunk of an unidentified broad-leaved tree.
