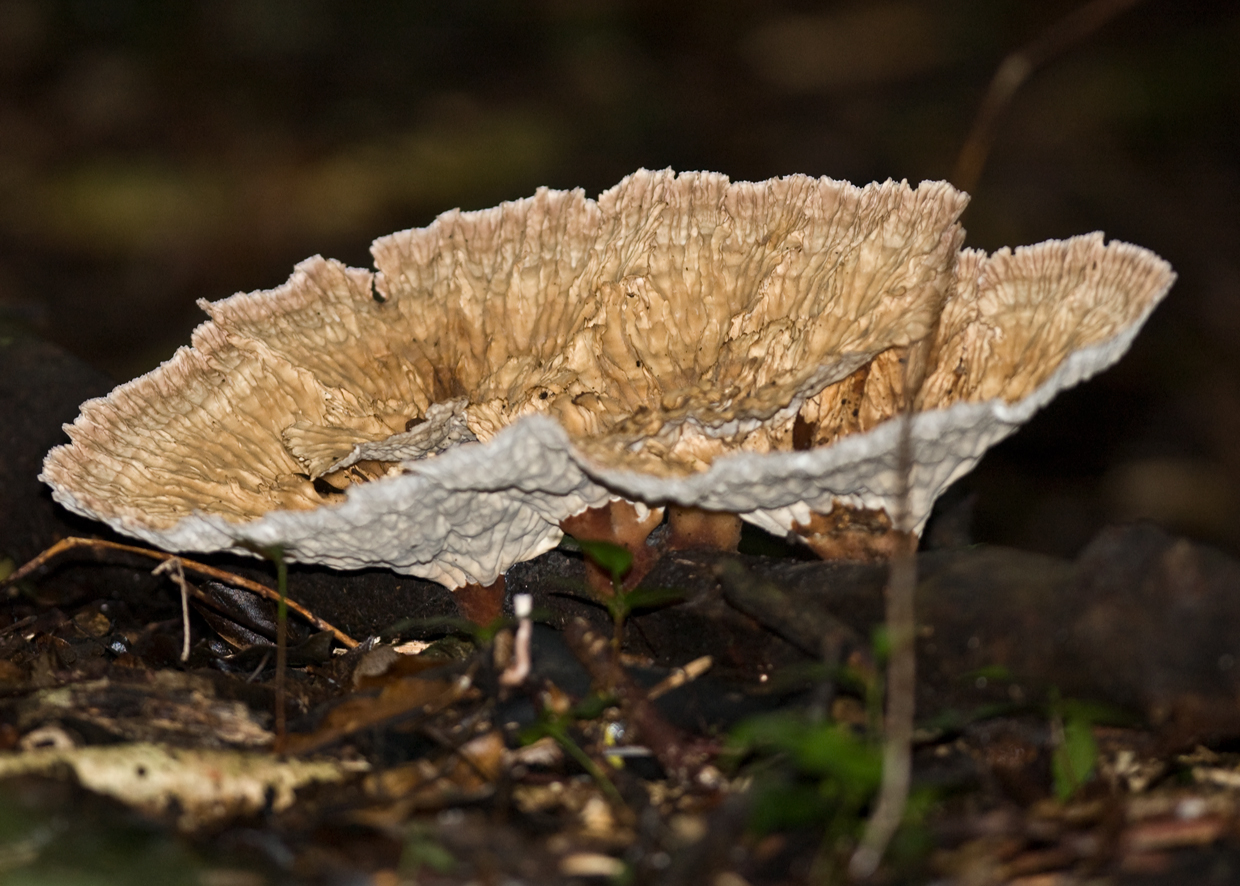

Scientific classification
- Kingdom: Fungi
- Division: Basidiomycota
- Class: Agaricomycetes
- Order: Polyporales
- Family: Meruliaceae
- Genus: Cymatoderma
- Species: C. elegans

Binomial name
- Cymatoderma elegans Jungh. 1840

Subspecies
- Cymatoderma elegans subsp. elegans Jungh. 1840; Cymatoderma elegans var. lamellatum (Berk. & M.A. Curtis) D.A. Reid 1959; Cymatoderma elegans subsp. spongiosum (Fr.) Boidin 1960

Synonyms
- Cladoderris elegans (Jungh.) Fr., Kongliga Svenska Vetenskapsakademiens Handlinger 1848: 142 (1849); Cladoderris spongiosa Fr., Kongliga Svenska Vetenskapsakademiens Handlinger 1848: 140 (1849); Thelephora lamellata Berk. & M.A. Curtis, American Journal of Science and Arts 11: 94 (1851); Beccariella insignis Ces., Atti dell´Accademia di Scienze Fisiche e Matematiche Napoli 8 (3): 10 (1879); Cladoderris australica Berk., Sylloge Fungorum 6: 548 (1888); Beccariella kingiana Massee, Grevillea: 33 (1891); Cladoderris roccati Mattir., Annali Bot.: 144-145 (1908); Cladoderris scrupulosa Lloyd, Mycol. Writ.: 8 (1913)

= Cymatoderma elegans =

Species of fungus

Cymatoderma elegans is a fungus species in the genus Cymatoderma. The type specimen was found on at 4,000 m (13,000 ft) on Mount Panggerangi, on Java Island, Indonesia.

Name brought to synonymy

- Cymatoderma elegans subsp. infundibuliforme (Klotzsch) Boidin 1960, a synonym of Cymatoderma infundibuliforme
