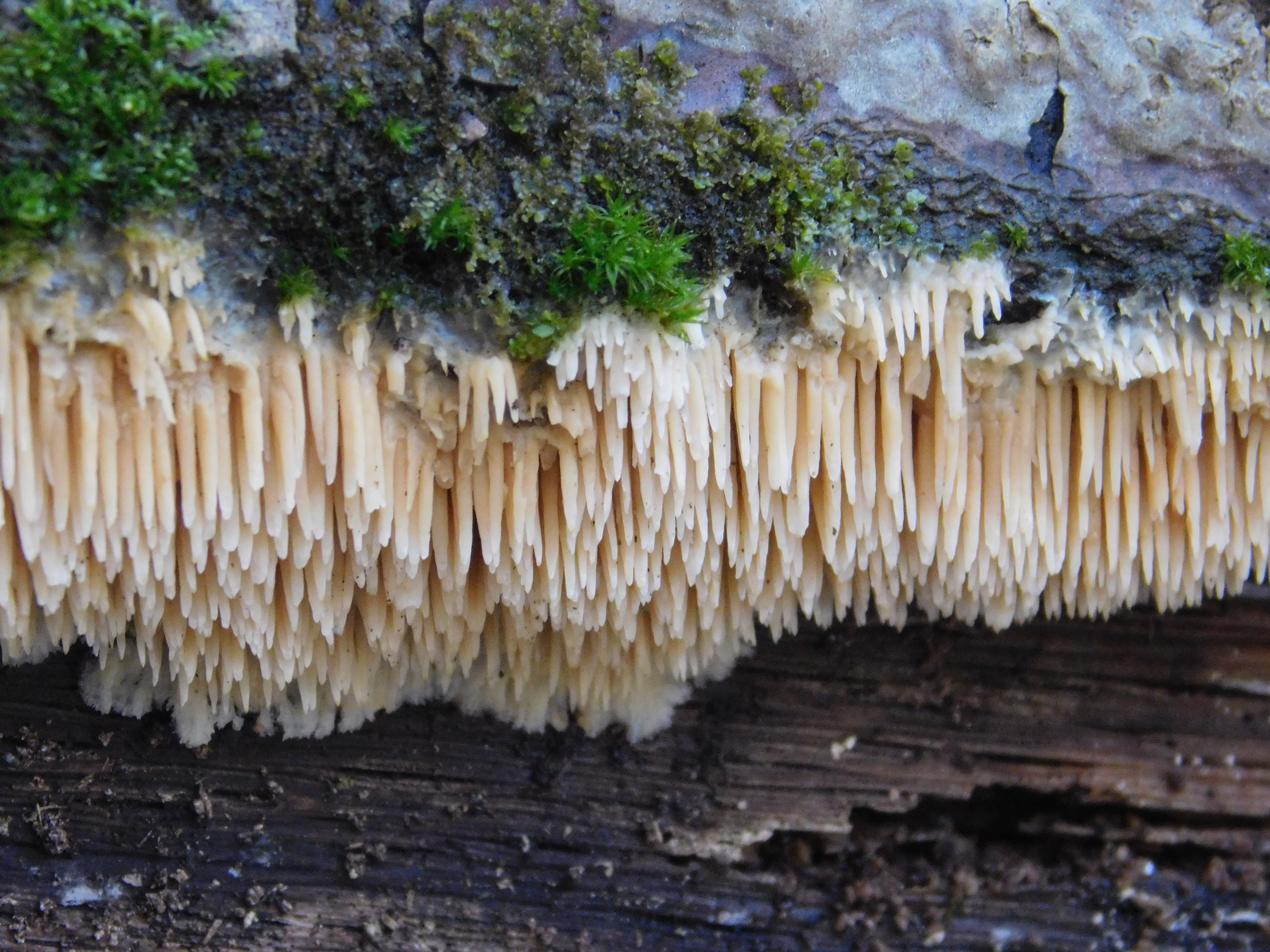

Scientific classification
- Kingdom: Fungi
- Division: Basidiomycota
- Class: Agaricomycetes
- Order: Polyporales
- Family: Meruliaceae
- Genus: Radulodon
- Species: R. copelandii

Binomial name
- Radulodon copelandii (Pat.) N. Maek.

= Radulodon copelandii =

Species of fungus

Radulodon copelandii or Radulomyces copelandii, the Asian beauty, is a fungus typically found on dead wood. It is native to Asia and since 2009 has also been found in North America.

== Description ==
It is a toothed crust fungus identified by whitish or pale yellowish flattened teeth aging to brownish colors. It appears in patches 30 centimetres (12 in) or more across, with the teeth up to 1 cm long. The basidia are at the tip of each tooth.

=== Similar species ===
It can resemble Sarcodontia crocea, Dentipellis fragilis, Basidioradulum radula and Hydnocristella himantia.

== Habitat and distribution ==
The species is typically found on logs and decaying wood. It is native to Asia, where it is known from the Russian Far East, China, Japan, Korea, the Philippines, Malaysia, and Sri Lanka. It now also occurs in North America, where it was first found by J. Ginns and Lawrence Millman in Massachusetts in 2009.
