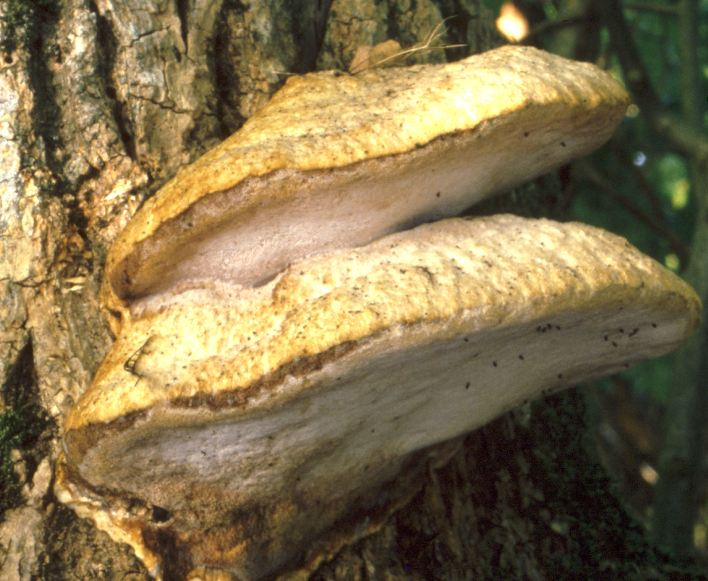

Scientific classification
- Kingdom: Fungi
- Division: Basidiomycota
- Class: Agaricomycetes
- Order: Polyporales
- Family: Meruliaceae
- Genus: Aurantiporus
- Species: A. fissilis

Binomial name
- Aurantiporus fissilis (Berk. & M.A.Curtis) H.Jahn (1978)

Synonyms
- Polyporus fissilis Berk. & M.A.Curtis (1849); Tyromyces fissilis (Berk. & M.A.Curtis) Donk (1933)

= Aurantiporus fissilis =

- Mycological characteristics
- Pores on hymenium
- No distinct cap
- Hymenium is decurrent
- Lacks a stipe
- Spore print is white
- Ecology is parasitic or saprotrophic
- Edibility is inedible

Aurantiporus fissilis, or the greasy bracket, is a species of poroid fungus in the family Polyporaceae. It is a plant pathogen. Although known primarily as a central and northern European species, it was recorded in Taiwan in 2016. It is inedible.
