= Mycoleptodonoides tropicalis =

Scientific classification
- Kingdom: Fungi
- Division: Basidiomycota
- Class: Agaricomycetes
- Order: Polyporales
- Family: Meruliaceae
- Genus: Mycoleptodonoides
- Species: M. tropicalis

Binomial name
- Mycoleptodonoides tropicalis H.S.Yuan & Y.C.Dai (2009)

Species of fungus

Mycoleptodonoides tropicalis is a species of tooth fungus in the family Meruliaceae. It was described as new to science in 2013 by mycologists Hai-Sheng Yuan and Yu-Cheng Dai. The type collection was made in the Xishuangbanna Tropical Botanical Garden in Mengla County (Yunnan, China), where the fungus was found fruiting on a decaying angiosperm trunk. The specific epithet tropicalis refers to the tropical forest habitat.
