= Chrysoderma =

Chrysoderma can refer to:

- Cerocorticium molle, a species of agaric fungi in the family Pterulaceae, conspecific with the genus and species Chrysoderma alboluteum.
- Chrysoderma mucosa, a genus and species of algae in the phylum Ochrophyta.
