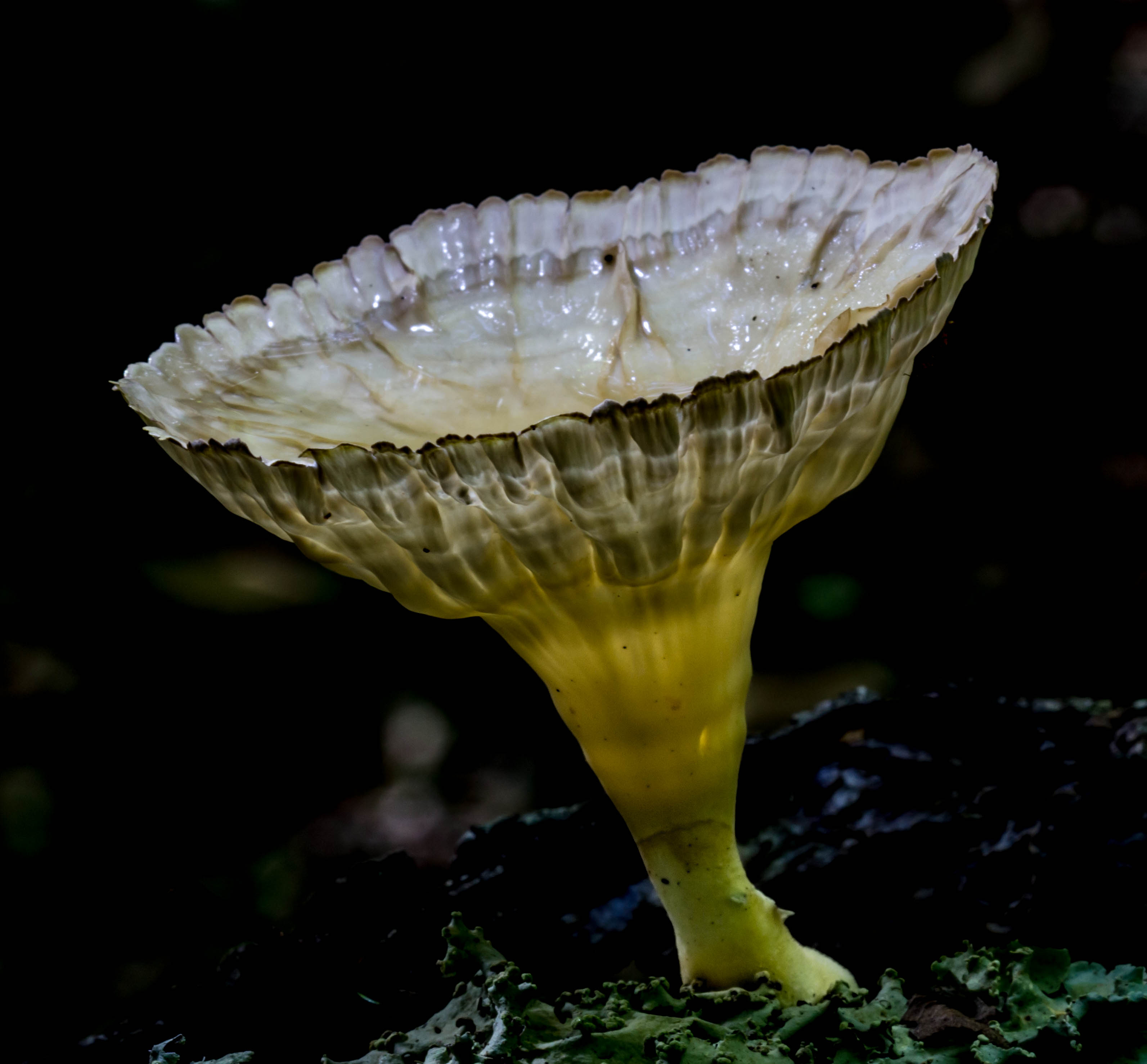

Scientific classification
- Kingdom: Fungi
- Division: Basidiomycota
- Class: Agaricomycetes
- Order: Polyporales
- Family: Meruliaceae
- Genus: Cymatoderma
- Species: C. caperatum

Binomial name
- Cymatoderma caperatum (Berk. & Mont.) D.A.Reid (1956)

Synonyms
- Thelephora caperata Berk. & Mont. (1849); Stereum caperatum (Berk. & Mont.) Berk. (1881); Cladoderris caperata (Berk. & Mont.) Pat. (1900); Stereum spongiipes Berk. [as 'spongiaepes'] (1881); Cladoderris spongiipes (Berk.) Pat. (1900); Stereum goliath Speg. (1884); Stereum hylocrater Speg. (1884); Stereum hydrophorum var. hylocrater (Speg.) Massee (1890); Cladoderris caperata var. spongiipes (Berk.) Reinking (1920)

= Cymatoderma caperatum =

Species of fungus

Cymatoderma caperatum is a fungus species in the family Meruliaceae. It was originally described in 1849 as a species of Thelephora by Miles Joseph Berkeley and Camille Montagne. Derek Reid transferred it to Cymatoderma in 1956.
