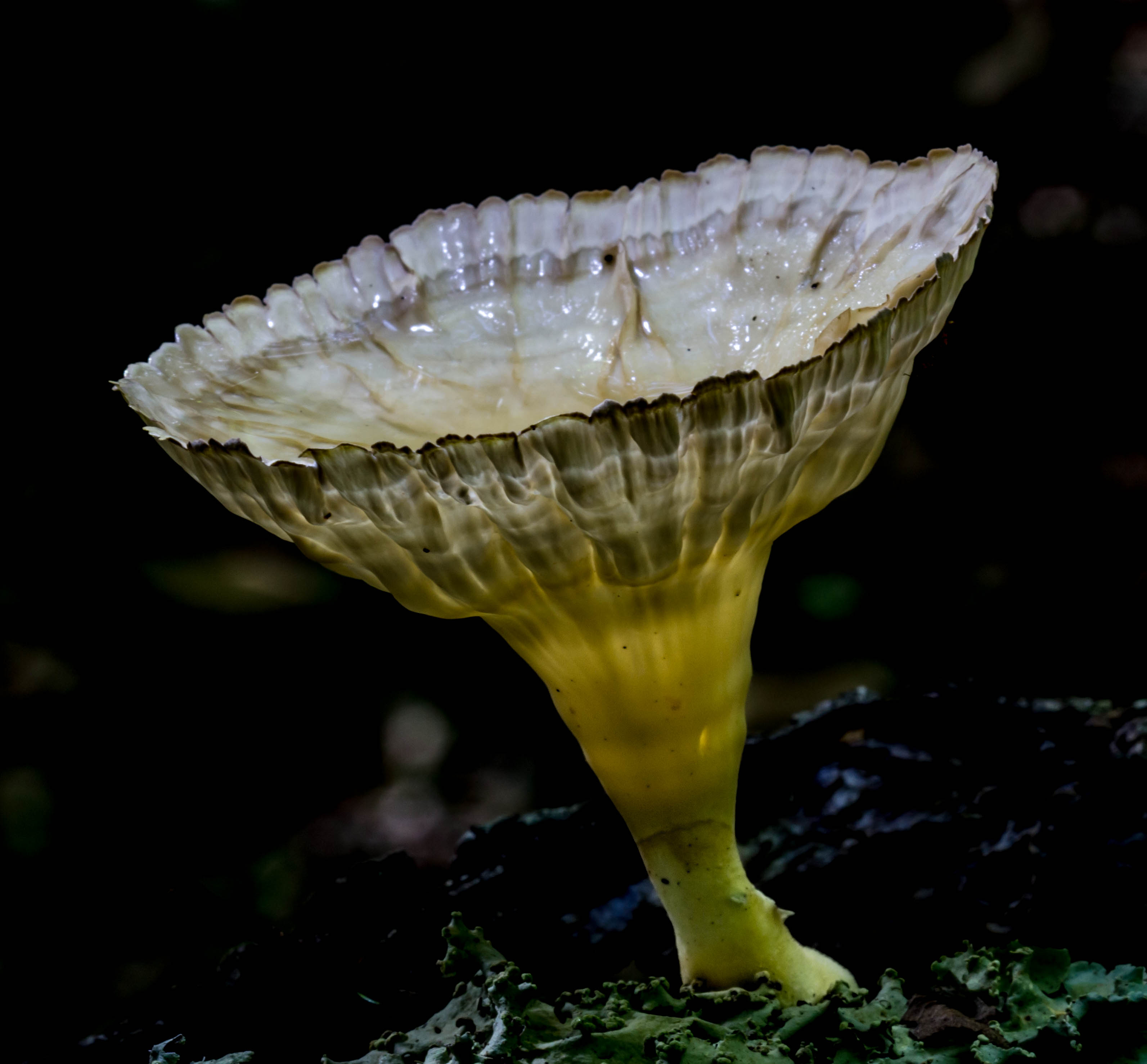
- Cymatoderma caperatum

Scientific classification
- Kingdom: Fungi
- Division: Basidiomycota
- Class: Agaricomycetes
- Order: Polyporales
- Family: Meruliaceae
- Genus: Cymatoderma; Jungh. (1840)

Type species
- Cymatoderma elegans Jungh. (1840)

Synonyms
- Cladoderris Pers. ex Berk. (1842); Actinostroma Klotzsch (1843); Beccariella Ces. (1879); Beccaria Massee (1892)

= Cymatoderma =

Genus of fungi

Cymatoderma is a widely distributed genus of poroid fungi in the family Meruliaceae.

== Description ==
The fruit bodies of Cymatoderma fungi are typically funnel-shaped, fan-shaped, or semicircular. Fruit bodies growing next to each other can fuse together. The upper surface of the cap often has sharp ridges, although in some species this is partially obscured by a thick tomentum with a texture like felt. The fertile surface of the hymenium (spore-bearing surface) is generally covered with folds, undulations, or ridges, which can be in turn by smooth, warted, or spiky. The stipe ranges from well-developed in some species to barely present in others.

== Taxonomy ==
Cymatoderma was circumscribed by botanist Friedrich Franz Wilhelm Junghuhn in 1842, with Cymatoderma elegans as the type species. Cymatoderma dendriticum, originally described by Christiaan Hendrik Persoon as Thelephora dendritica in 1827, is perhaps the earliest description of any Cymatoderma in the literature. In 1842, Miles Joseph Berkeley transferred Thelephora dendritica to the genus Cladoderris. Despite Junghuhn's earlier publication, this species became more commonly (and incorrectly) referred to as Cladoderris dendritica in its early history. This led to a number of synonyms created and a confusing taxonomy. It did not help that the type material of several species, located in the Berlin herbarium, was destroyed during the Second World War. Marinus Anton Donk proposed to conserve the more popular name Cladoderris against the earlier Cymatoderma, but this was rejected by the authorities on Fungus nomenclature. Today, the name Cladoderris is placed in synonymy with Cymatoderma, as well as the names Actinostroma, Beccariella, and Beccaria.

== Classification ==
Cymatoderma has traditionally been classified in the family Meruliaceae. Molecular phylogenetic analysis revealed that Cymatoderma is polyphyletic, with some species related to Podoscypha, and another group, including the type species, grouped together in a distant location in the residual clade of the Polyporales. In a recently proposed family-level classification of the Polyporales, Alfredo Justo and colleagues proposed to include these latter Cymatoderma species (sensu stricto) in the new family Panaceae. Species closely related to Podoscypha, including Cymatoderma dendriticum and C. pallens, are better classified in the family Podoscyphaceae.

== Species ==
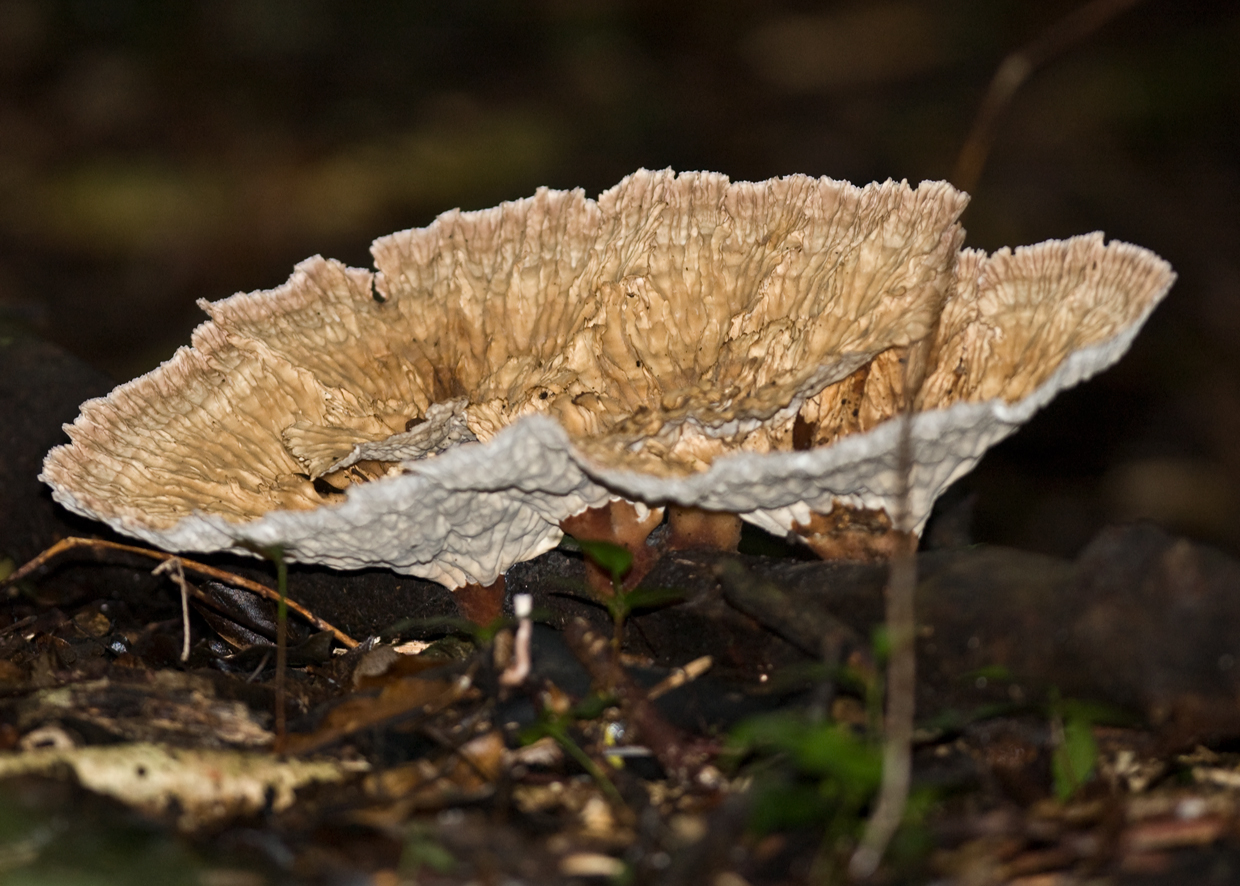
Cymatoderma elegans

A 2008 estimate placed nine species in the genus. As of June 2018, Index Fungorum accepts 14 species in Cymatoderma:

- Cymatoderma africanum Boidin (1960) – Cameroon; Ivory Coast; Zambia
- Cymatoderma blumei (Lév.) D.A.Reid (1959) – Indonesia
- Cymatoderma caperatum (Berk. & Mont.) D.A.Reid (1956) – Australia; North America; South America
- Cymatoderma dendriticum (Pers.) D.A.Reid (1959) – Africa; South America; Papua New Guinea
- Cymatoderma elegans Jungh. (1840) – Africa; South America; Papua New Guinea
- Cymatoderma fuscum (Cooke) D.A.Reid (1959)
- Cymatoderma hainanense Z.T.Guo (1986) – China
- Cymatoderma infundibuliforme (Klotzsch) Boidin (1959) – Philippines; Sierra Leone
- Cymatoderma pallens Berthet & Boidin (1966) – Cameroon
- Cymatoderma plicatum (Lloyd) D.A.Reid (1959)
- Cymatoderma sclerotioides (Lloyd) D.A.Reid (1959)
- Cymatoderma semiresupinatum (A.L.Welden) A.L.Welden (2010)
- Cymatoderma venezuelae D.A.Reid (1965) – South America
- Cymatoderma viridans (Lloyd) A.L.Welden (2010)

An earlier member of this genus, Cymatoderma cristatum, has since been transferred to Podoscypha as Podoscypha cristata.
