= Mycoacia angustata =

Scientific classification
- Domain: Eukaryota
- Kingdom: Fungi
- Division: Basidiomycota
- Class: Agaricomycetes
- Order: Polyporales
- Family: Meruliaceae
- Genus: Mycoacia
- Species: M. angustata

Binomial name
- Mycoacia angustata H.S.Yuan (2013)
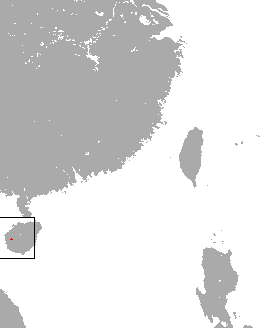
- Found in Bawangling Nature Reserve, Hainan Province

Species of fungus

Mycoacia angustata is a species of tooth fungus in the family Meruliaceae. Found in southern China, it was described as new to science in 2013. The specific epithet angustata refers to the narrow spores. Fruitbodies of the fungus are corticioid (crust-like) with spines on the surface. The spines are crowded close together, numbering about 3 or 4 per millimetre, and are about 1 mm long. Spores are sausage shaped (allantoid), measuring 4.8–6.5 by 1–1.2 μm. Mycoacia angustata is a wood-decay fungus, and grows on decaying wood. The type collection was made in Bawangling Nature Reserve, Hainan Province.
