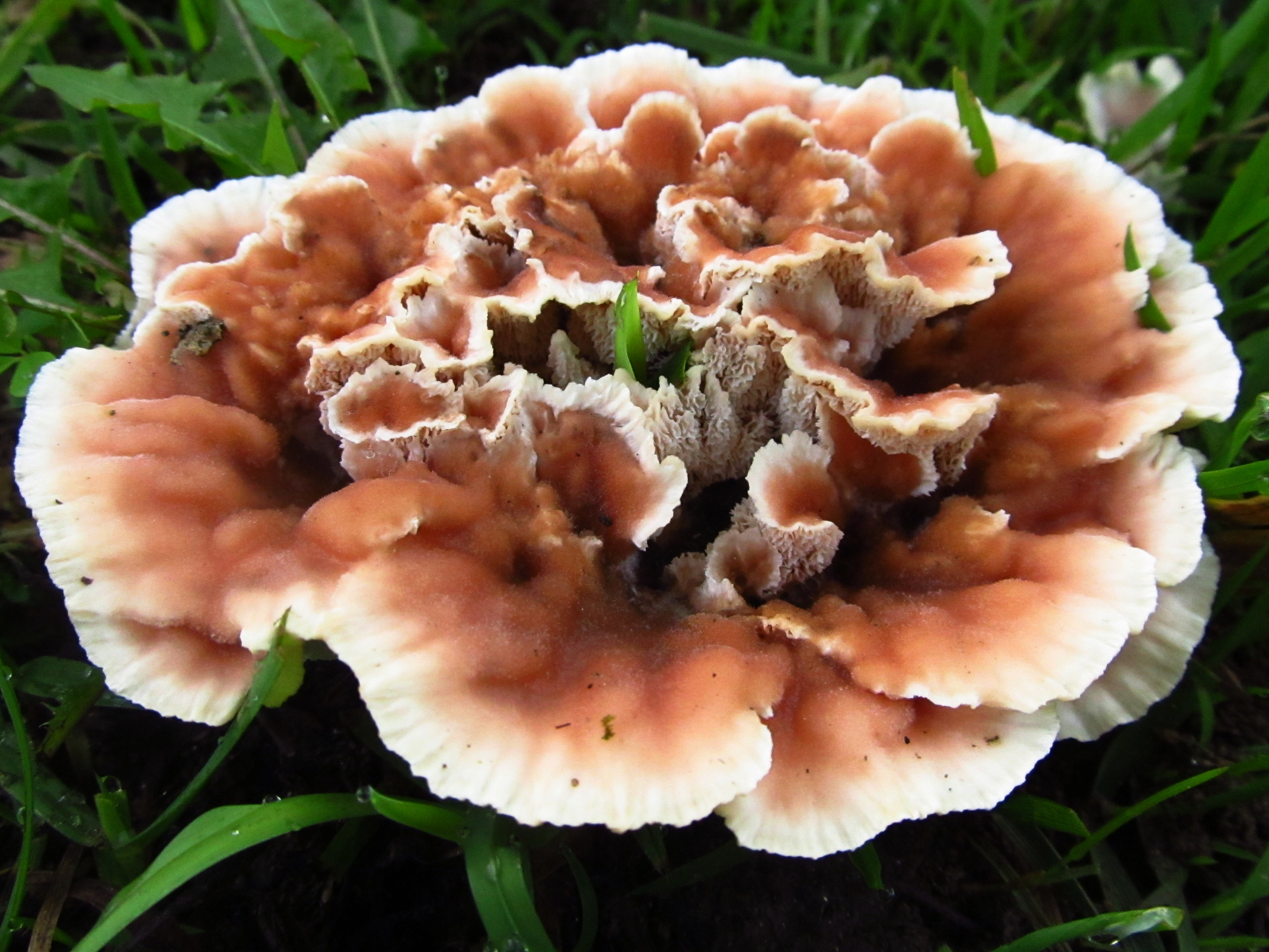

Scientific classification
- Kingdom: Fungi
- Division: Basidiomycota
- Class: Agaricomycetes
- Order: Polyporales
- Family: Meruliaceae
- Genus: Abortiporus
- Species: A. biennis

Binomial name
- Abortiporus biennis (Bull.) Singer, 1944

= Abortiporus biennis =

Species of fungus

Abortiporus biennis, commonly known as the blushing rosette, is a species of fungus belonging to the family Meruliaceae.

Synonyms:

- Boletus biennis Bull. 1790 (= basionym)

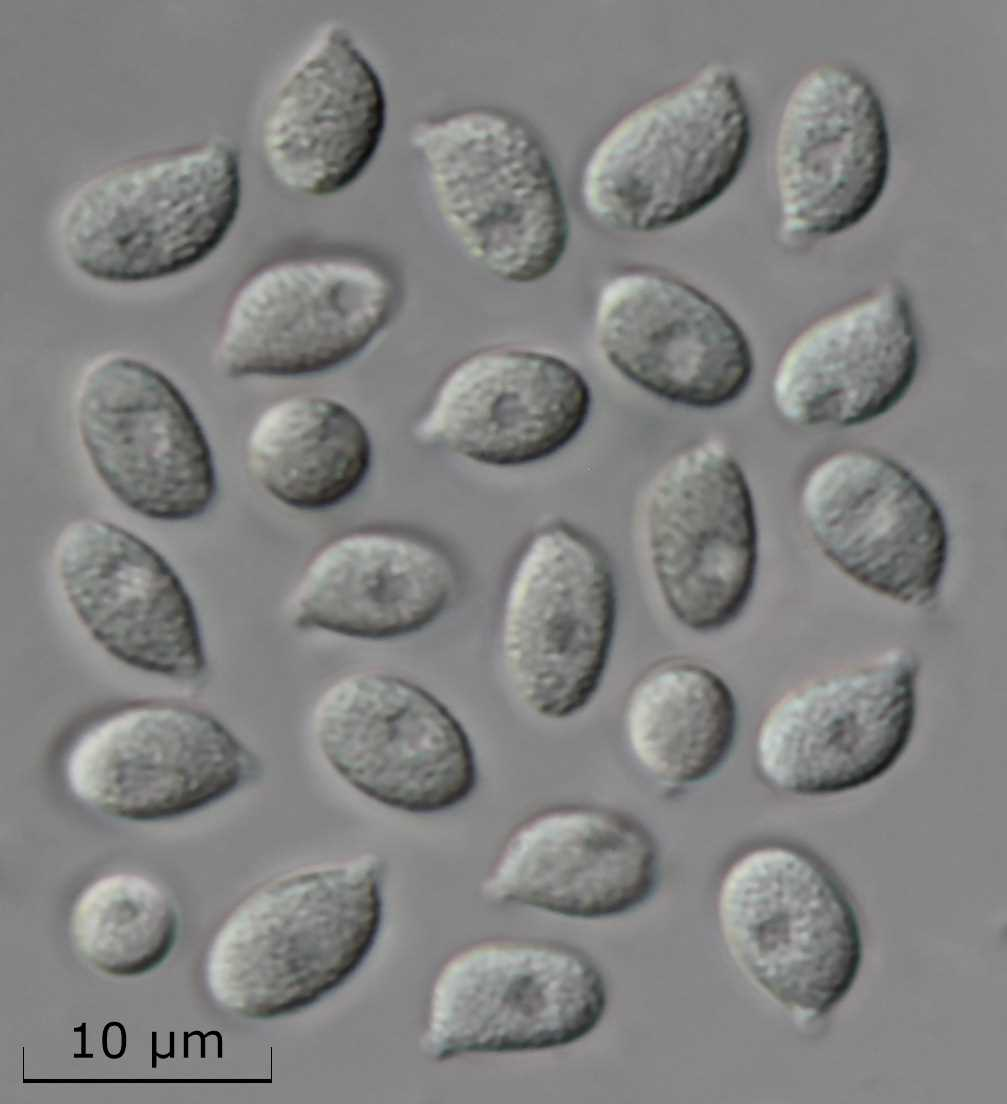
Abortiporus biennis spores 1000x
