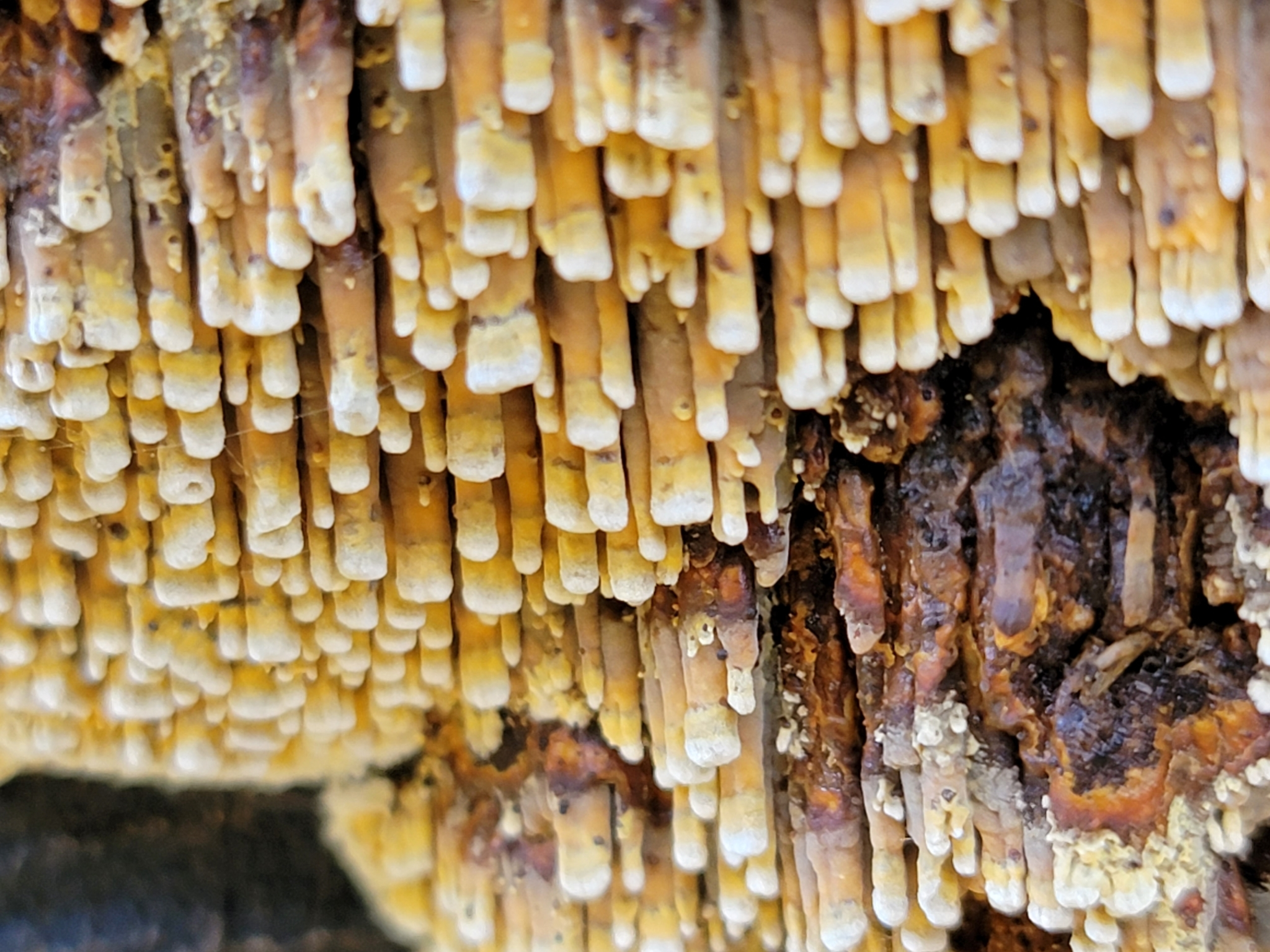

Scientific classification
- Kingdom: Fungi
- Division: Basidiomycota
- Class: Agaricomycetes
- Order: Polyporales
- Family: Meruliaceae
- Genus: Pirex; Hjortstam & Ryvarden (1985)

Type species
- Pirex concentricus (Cooke & Ellis) Hjortstam & Ryvarden (1985)

Synonyms
- Radulum concentricum Cooke & Ellis (1885); Phlebia concentrica (Cooke & Ellis) Kropp & Nakasone (1985); Pseudolagarobasidium concentricum (Cooke & Ellis) Hjortstam (1995)

= Pirex =

Genus of fungi

Pirex is a fungal genus in the family Meruliaceae. It is a monotypic genus, containing the single crust fungus Pirex concentricus. It is found in the Pacific Northwest region of North America, where it causes a white rot in woody hardwood and conifer debris generated by timber harvesting.

== Taxonomy ==
The species Pirex concentricus was originally described by Mordecai Cubitt Cooke and Job Bicknell Ellis in 1885 as Radulum concentricum. Ellis collected the type specimens from Oregon. A century after Cooke's publication, Kurt Hjortstam and Leif Ryvarden circumscribed the new genus Pirex to contain this fungus, as they believed it to have a unique combination of traits that would not adequately fit into any other known genera. The name Pirex is an anagram of the fungal genus Irpex.

In 1995, Hjortstam considered Pirex to be a synonym of Pseudolagarobasidium, and proposed the new combination Pseudolagarobasidium concentricum. Modern systematics considers the two genera to be distinct; Pseudolagarobasidium is classified in the family Phanerochaetaceae. Hjortstam added Hydnum subvinosum Berk. & Broome to Pirex in 1987, but this fungus is considered now a species of Radulodon.
