= Columnodontia =

Scientific classification
- Kingdom: Fungi
- Division: Basidiomycota
- Class: Agaricomycetes
- Order: Polyporales
- Family: Meruliaceae
- Genus: Columnodontia; Jülich (1979)

Type species
- Columnodontia resupinata Jülich (1979)

Genus of fungi

Columnodontia is a fungal genus in the family Meruliaceae. A monotypic genus, it contains the single species Columnodontia resupinata, a toothed crust fungus found in Borneo. Both the species and genus were described as new to science by Swiss mycologist Walter Jülich in 1979. The main distinguishing characteristic of the genus is the glistening, projecting columns of crystals that make up the spines.

Jülich originally included three species in addition to the type: Columnodontia columellifera, C. lutea, and C. subfascicularis. These have since been transferred to the genera Phlebia and Mycoacia.
