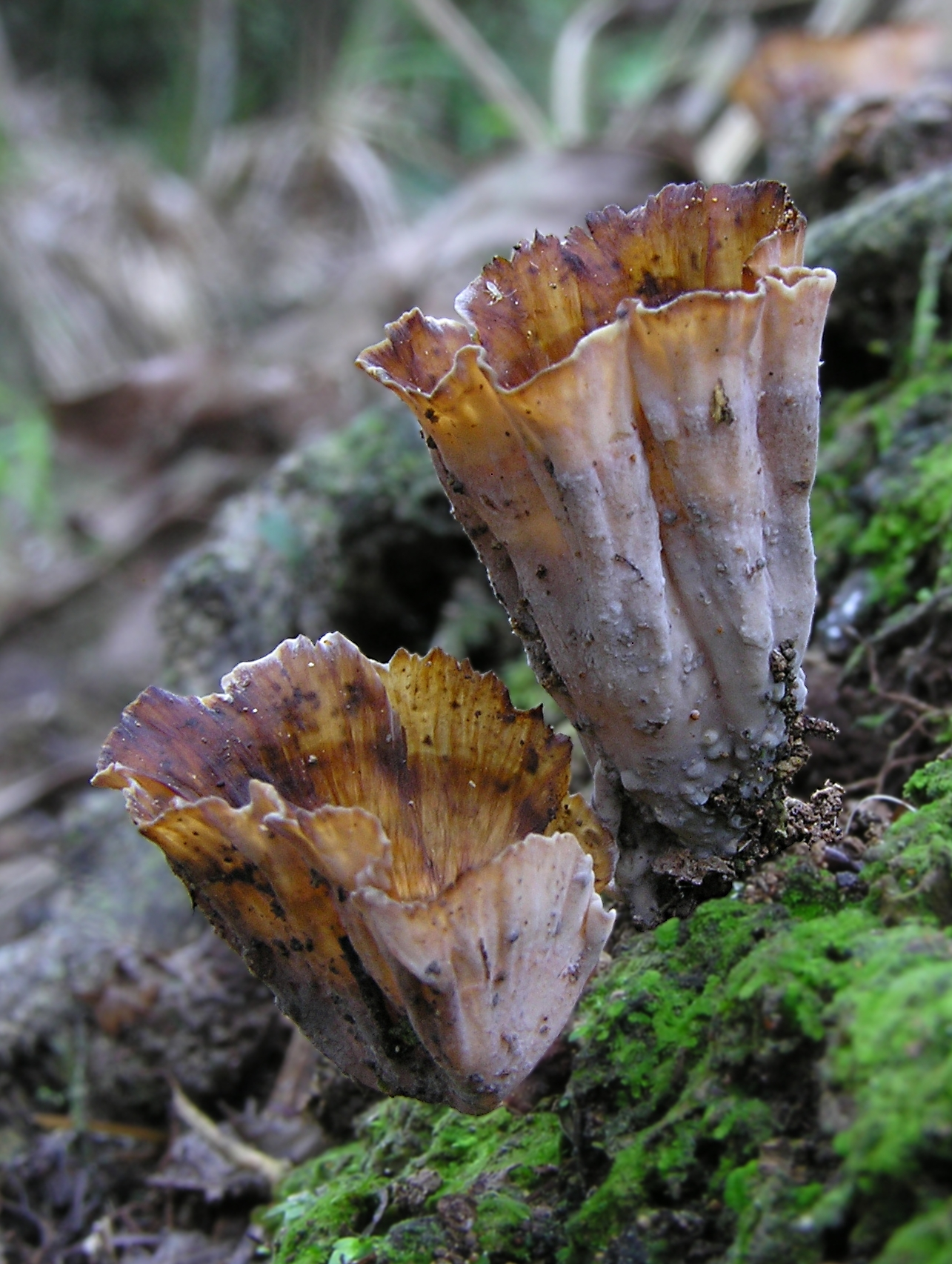

Scientific classification
- Kingdom: Fungi
- Division: Basidiomycota
- Class: Agaricomycetes
- Order: Polyporales
- Family: Meruliaceae
- Genus: Podoscypha
- Species: P. petalodes

Binomial name
- Podoscypha petalodes (Berk.) Pat. (1903)

Synonyms
- Stereum petalodes Berk. (1852); Stereum floriforme Lloyd (1913); Stereum floriforme Bres. (1920); Podoscypha petaloides (Berk.) Boidin (1959); Podoscypha petaloides subsp. floriformis (Lloyd) D.A.Reid (1965)

= Podoscypha petalodes =

Species of fungus

Podoscypha petalodes is a widely distributed species of fungus in the family Meruliaceae. The fungus produces a rosette-like fruit bodies with a shape suggestive of its common names wine glass fungus, and ruffled paper fungus.
