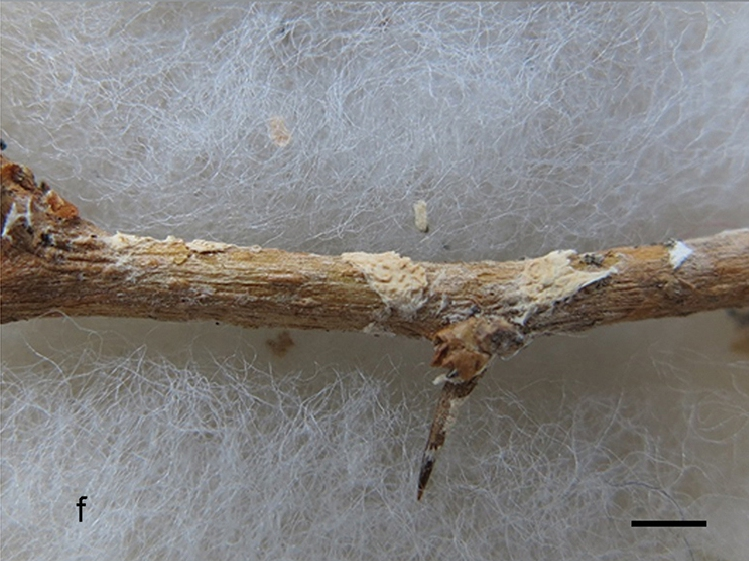

Scientific classification
- Kingdom: Fungi
- Division: Basidiomycota
- Class: Agaricomycetes
- Order: Polyporales
- Family: Meruliaceae
- Genus: Hydnophlebia
- Species: H. omnivora

Binomial name
- Hydnophlebia omnivora (Shear) Hjortstam & Ryvarden (2009)

Synonyms
- Hydnum omnivorum Shear (1925); Grandiniella omnivora (Shear) Burds. (1977); Phanerochaete omnivorum (Shear) Burds. & Nakasone (1978)

= Hydnophlebia omnivora =

Species of fungus

Hydnophlebia omnivora is a species of crust fungus in the family Meruliaceae. It causes white rot in various woody angiosperms, being found in arid regions of the Southern United States, northern Mexico, and Uruguay.

== Taxonomy ==
The fungus was first described scientifically in 1925 by American mycologist Cornelius Lott Shear as a species of Hydnum. Kurt Hjortstam and Leif Ryvarden transferred it to the genus Hydnophlebia in 2009. Harold Burdsall and Karen Nakasone proposed a transfer to Phanerochaete, a classification endorsed by MycoBank.
