= Amaurohydnum =

Scientific classification
- Kingdom: Fungi
- Division: Basidiomycota
- Class: Agaricomycetes
- Order: Polyporales
- Family: Meruliaceae
- Genus: Amaurohydnum; Jülich (1978)

Type species
- Amaurohydnum flavidum Jülich (1978)

Genus of fungi

Amaurohydnum is a fungal genus in the family Meruliaceae. It is a monotypic genus, containing the single resupinate species Amaurohydnum flavidum, found in Australia on Eucalyptus wood and described as new to science in 1978.
