= Aquascypha =

Scientific classification
- Kingdom: Fungi
- Division: Basidiomycota
- Class: Agaricomycetes
- Order: Polyporales
- Family: Meruliaceae
- Genus: Aquascypha; D.A.Reid (1965)

Type species
- Aquascypha hydrophora (Berk.) D.A.Reid (1965)

Genus of fungi

Aquascypha is a fungal genus in the family Meruliaceae. It is a monotypic genus, containing the single species Aquascypha hydrophora, found in Central and South America. This species forms cup-like structures with dimensions of 2.7 to 14.9 cm (1.1 to 5.9 in) (average 9.2 cm (3.6 in)) and heights of 6.1 to 18 cm (2.4 to 7.1 in) (average 16.3 cm (6.4 in)). Study of this fungus in the Amazon rainforest showed that on average, these cups hold 35 millitres of water, in addition to organic matter such as leaves, flowers and fruits that fall from trees; this provides an ideal environment for various insect species (especially filter-feeding species like mosquitoes) to breed.
