= Luteoporia =

Scientific classification
- Kingdom: Fungi
- Division: Basidiomycota
- Class: Agaricomycetes
- Order: Polyporales
- Family: Meruliaceae
- Genus: Luteoporia; F.Wu, Jia J.Chen & S.H.He (2016)

Type species
- Luteoporia albomarginata F.Wu, Jia J.Chen & S.H.He (2016)

Genus of fungi

Luteoporia is a fungal genus in the family Meruliaceae. It is monotypic, containing the single white rot species Luteoporia albomarginata, found in China. Macroscopic characterics of this fungus include its annual growth habit, and crust-like fruit bodies with yellow pores. Microscopic characteristics include a monomitic hyphal system with clamp connections, hyphae in the trama featuring swollen tips projecting out of the hymenium, and spores that are hyaline, thin-walled, and oblong-ellipsoid. The type collection was made in Wuzhishan Nature Reserve (Hainan Province), where it was found growing on rotten angiosperm wood. The generic name Luteoporia refers to the yellow pore surface, while the specific epithet albomarginata refers to the white margin of the fruit body.
