= Aurantiopileus =

Scientific classification
- Kingdom: Fungi
- Division: Basidiomycota
- Class: Agaricomycetes
- Order: Polyporales
- Family: Meruliaceae
- Genus: Aurantiopileus; Ginns, D.L.Lindner & T.J.Baroni (2010)

Type species
- Aurantiopileus mayaensis Ginns, D.L.Lindner & T.J.Baroni (2010)

Species
- A. dolosus A. mayaensis A. pendens

Genus of fungi

Aurantiopileus is a genus of three species of poroid fungi in the family Meruliaceae.

== Taxonomy ==
The genus was circumscribed in 2010 by mycologists James Ginns, Daniel Lindner, and Timothy Baroni. The type species, Aurantiopileus mayaensis, was discovered in the Maya Mountains of Belize. Two Asian species previously classified in Gloeoporus were also placed in the genus.

== Description ==
The fruit bodies of Aurantiopileus fungi are fairly small, and have a fleshy or gelatinous texture when they are fresh. The hyphal system is monomitic, and the hyphae have clamp connections. Spores are small (measuring 4–6 by 2.8–4.6 μm), and inamyloid.

== Species ==
- Aurantiopileus dolosus (Corner) Ginns & D.L.Lindner (2010)
- Aurantiopileus mayaensis Ginns, D.L.Lindner & T.J.Baroni (2010)
- Aurantiopileus pendens (Corner) Ginns & D.L.Lindner (2010)
