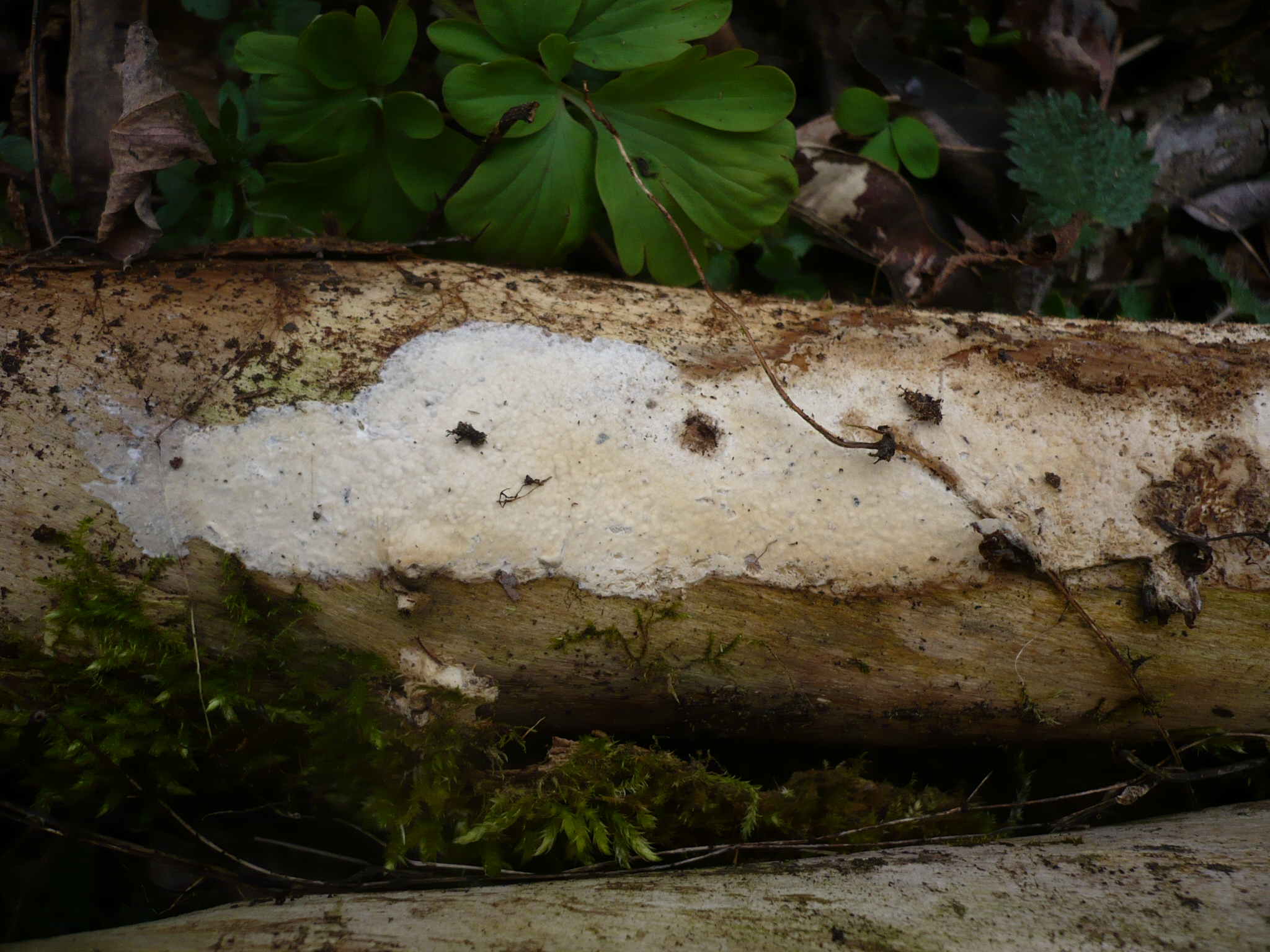

Scientific classification
- Kingdom: Fungi
- Division: Basidiomycota
- Class: Agaricomycetes
- Order: Polyporales
- Family: Meruliaceae
- Genus: Cerocorticium; Henn. (1900)

Type species
- Cerocorticium bogoriense Henn. & E.Nyman (1900)

Species
- C. calongei C. canariense C. molle C. pseudomucidum C. roseolum C. submolare C. sulfureoisabellinum

= Cerocorticium =

Genus of fungi

Cerocorticium is a genus of seven species of crust fungi in the family Meruliaceae.

== Taxonomy ==
The genus was circumscribed by German mycologist Paul Christoph Hennings in 1900, as a member of the family Thelephoraceae. Hennings included two species, C. tjibodense, and the type, C. bogoriense, both collected on Java. Later analysis of the type specimens showed that these two fungi were in fact the same species, today known as C. molle.

== Description ==
The fruit bodies of Cerocorticium fungi are crust-like, and spread out on the substrate with a waxy texture. The spore-bearing surface is roughly even and light coloured. The hyphal system is monomitic, with translucent generative hyphae that have clamp connections. The basidia are relatively large and club-shaped, with a clamp at the base. Spores are smooth, translucent, and have a large apiculus.

== Species ==
As of April 2018, Index Fungorum accepts seven species of Cerocorticium:

- Cerocorticium calongei Tellería (1985)
- Cerocorticium canariense Manjón & G.Moreno (1982)
- Cerocorticium molle (Berk. & M.A.Curtis) Jülich (1975)
- Cerocorticium pseudomucidum (Petch) Jülich (1982)
- Cerocorticium roseolum (Parmasto) Jülich & Stalpers (1980)
- Cerocorticium submolare (Parmasto) Jülich & Stalpers (1980)
- Cerocorticium sulfureoisabellinum (Litsch.) Jülich & Stalpers (1980)
