= Mycoleptodonoides =

Scientific classification
- Kingdom: Fungi
- Division: Basidiomycota
- Class: Agaricomycetes
- Order: Polyporales
- Family: Meruliaceae
- Genus: Mycoleptodonoides; M.I.Nikol. (1952)

Type species
- Mycoleptodonoides vassiljevae M.I.Nikol. (1952)

Species
- M. aitchisonii M. pergamenea M. sharmae M. tropicalis M. vassiljevae

Genus of fungi

Mycoleptodonoides is a genus of tooth fungi in the family Meruliaceae. The genus was circumscribed by M.I. Nikolajeva in 1952 with M. vassiljevae, described from Ussuri, Russia, as the type species. This fungus, known only from the type locality and northern China, is little known. The more widely distributed M. aitchisonii is found in habitats ranging from subtropical to boreal. The generic name combines the name Mycoleptodon and the Greek root -oides, meaning "resembling".

== Description ==
Mycoleptodonoides species have fruitbodies with caps with "teeth" on the underside. It has a monomitic hyphal system with generative hyphae containing clamp connections. Spores are small and smooth, and non-reactive with Melzer's reagent (non-amyloid).

== Species ==
- Mycoleptodonoides aitchisonii (Berk.) Maas Geest. (1961) – India
- Mycoleptodonoides pergamenea (Yasuda) Aoshima & H.Furuk. (1966) – Japan
- Mycoleptodonoides sharmae K.Das, Stalpers & Stielow (2013) – India
- Mycoleptodonoides tropicalis H.S.Yuan & Y.C.Dai (2009) – China
- Mycoleptodonoides vassiljevae Nikol. (1952) – Russia; northern China
