= Coralloderma =

Scientific classification
- Kingdom: Fungi
- Division: Basidiomycota
- Class: Agaricomycetes
- Order: Polyporales
- Family: Meruliaceae
- Genus: Coralloderma; D.A.Reid (1965)

Type species
- Coralloderma acroleucum (Pat.) D.A.Reid (1965)

Species
- C. acroleucum C. guzmanii

Genus of fungi

Coralloderma is a genus of fungi in the family Meruliaceae. The genus contains two species found in Asia and Australia.
