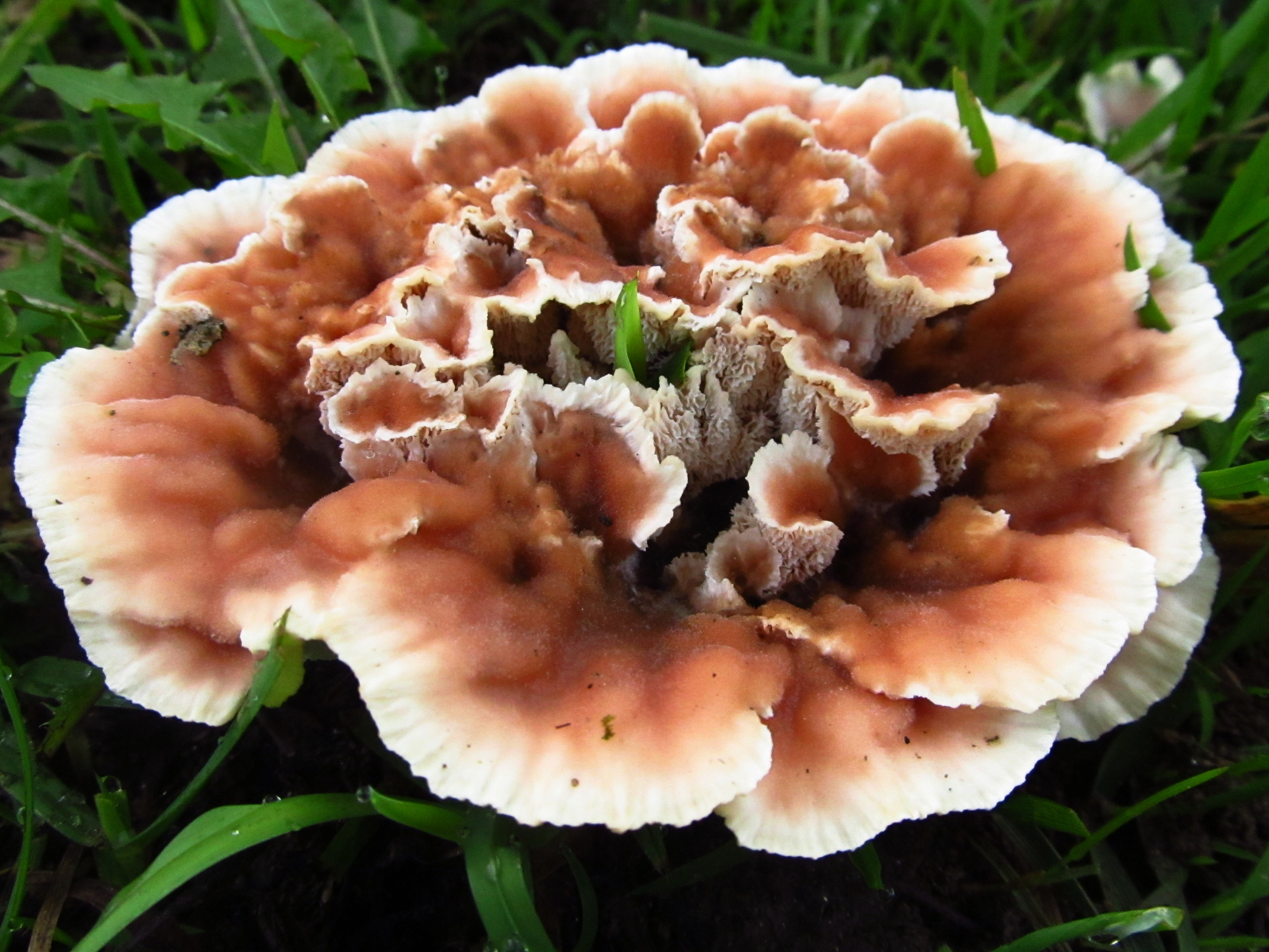
- Abortiporus biennis

Scientific classification
- Domain: Eukaryota
- Kingdom: Fungi
- Division: Basidiomycota
- Class: Agaricomycetes
- Order: Polyporales
- Family: Meruliaceae
- Genus: Abortiporus; Murrill (1904)

Type species
- Abortiporus biennis (Schwein.) Murrill (1944)

Species
- A. biennis A. chocoensis A. roseus

Synonyms
- Irpicium Bref. (1912); Heteroporus Lázaro Ibiza (1917)

= Abortiporus =

Genus of fungi

Abortiporus is a genus of fungi in the family Meruliaceae. The widely distributed genus contains three species. Species in the genus grow on the wood of hardwoods and conifers, either alone or around the stumps and living trees. It causes a white rot in dead wood and a white trunk rot in living wood. The genus was circumscribed in 1904 by William Alphonso Murrill. The generic name is derived from the Latin abortus (arrested development of any organ) and the Ancient Greek πόρος (pore).
