= Phlebiporia =

Scientific classification
- Kingdom: Fungi
- Division: Basidiomycota
- Class: Agaricomycetes
- Order: Polyporales
- Family: Meruliaceae
- Genus: Phlebiporia; Jia J.Chen, B.K.Cui & Y.C.Dai (2014)

Type species
- Phlebiporia bubalina Jia J.Chen, B.K.Cui & Y.C.Dai (2014)

Genus of fungi

Phlebiporia is a fungal genus in the family Meruliaceae. It was proposed in 2013 by Chinese mycologists to contain the single species Phlebiporia bubalina, a crust fungus. This fungus has a monomitic hyphal system with simple septa, and dextrinoid and thick-walled generative hyphae. There are thin-walled quasi-binding hyphae in the subiculum (the mat-like layer of hyphae covering the substrate and supporting the fruit body). Phlebiporia makes spores that are small, smooth, and ellipsoid.
