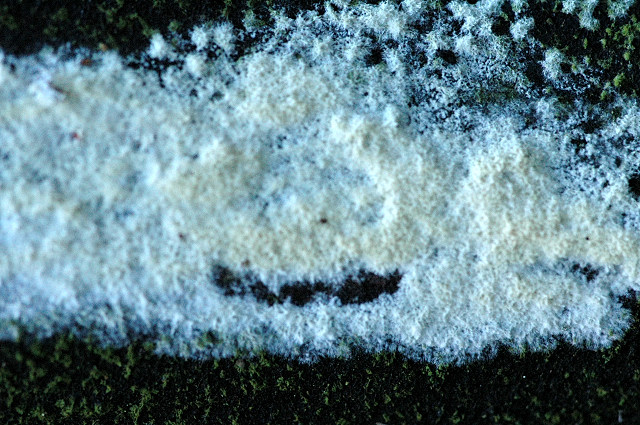
- Gyrophanopsis polonensis

Scientific classification
- Kingdom: Fungi
- Division: Basidiomycota
- Class: Agaricomycetes
- Order: Polyporales
- Family: Meruliaceae
- Genus: Gyrophanopsis; Jülich (1979)

Type species
- Gyrophanopsis zealandica (G.Cunn.) Jülich (1979)

Species
- G. polonensis G. zealandica

= Gyrophanopsis =

Genus of fungi

Gyrophanopsis is a fungal genus in the family Meruliaceae. Circumscribed by Swiss mycologist Walter Jülich in 1979, the genus contains two species of crust fungi: the type, Gyrophanopsis zealandica, and G. polonensis, added to the genus in 1991.
