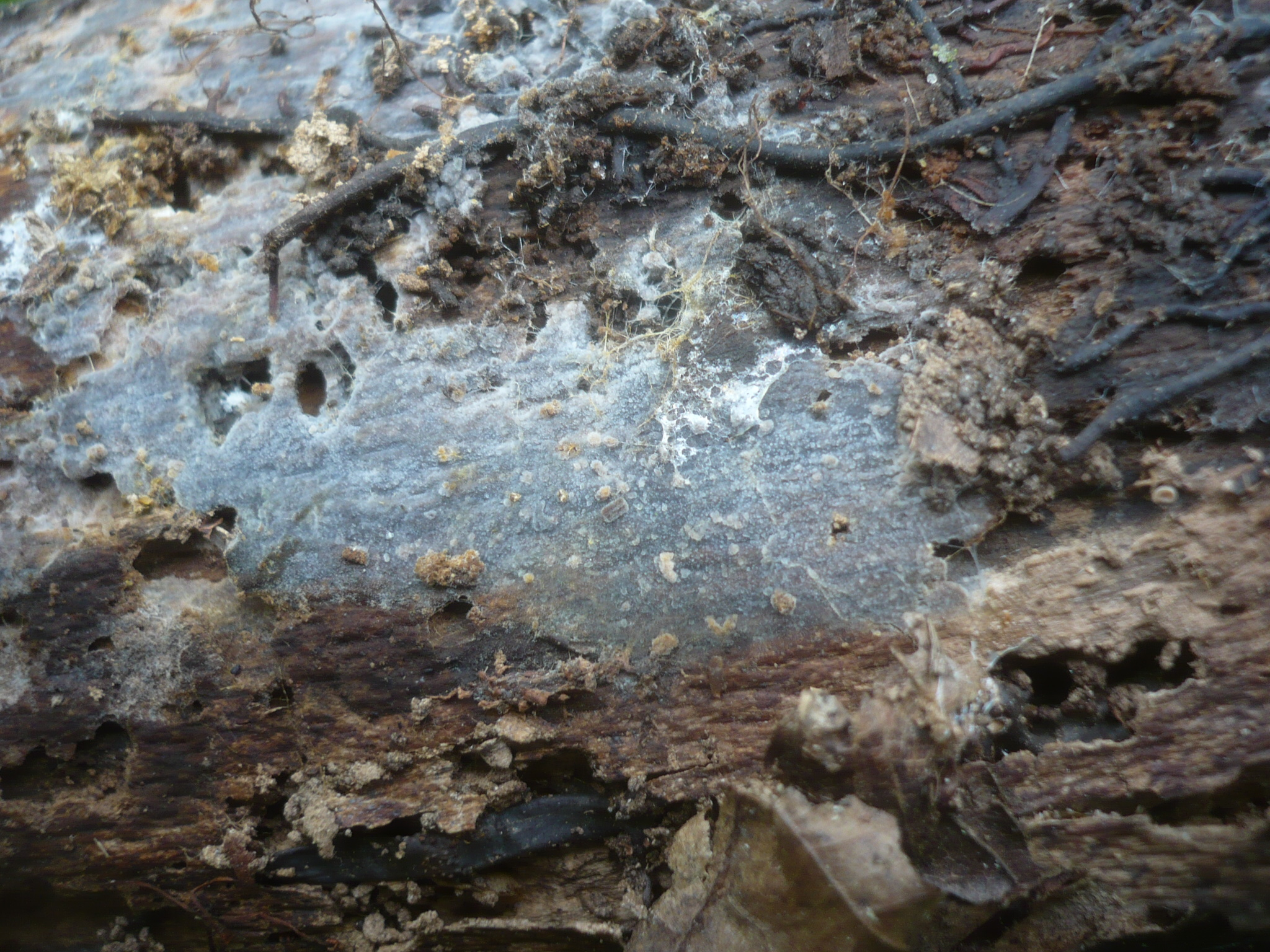
- Scopuloides rimosa

Scientific classification
- Kingdom: Fungi
- Division: Basidiomycota
- Class: Agaricomycetes
- Order: Polyporales
- Family: Meruliaceae
- Genus: Scopuloides (Massee) Höhn. & Litsch. (1908)

Type species
- Peniophora hydnoides Cooke & Massee (1888)

= Scopuloides =

Genus of fungi

Scopuloides is a genus of five species of crust fungi in the family Meruliaceae.

== Taxonomy ==
Scopuloides was first proposed by George Edward Massee in 1890 as a subgenus of Peniophora, then raised to generic status by Franz von Höhnel and Viktor Litschauer in their 1908 work on Austrian crust fungi. Kurt Hjorstam and Leif Ryvarden suggested that the genus was not published validly, but it was accepted as valid by other authorities.

== Species ==
- Scopuloides hydnoides (Cooke & Massee) Hjortstam & Ryvarden (1979)
- Scopuloides leprosa (Bourdot & Galzin) Boidin, Lanq. & Gilles (1993)
- Scopuloides magnicystidiata Gilb. & Nakasone (2003) – Hawaii
- Scopuloides rimosa (Cooke) Jülich (1982)
- Scopuloides subgelatinosa Nakasone (2003) – Vietnam
