= Diacanthodes =

Scientific classification
- Kingdom: Fungi
- Division: Basidiomycota
- Class: Agaricomycetes
- Order: Polyporales
- Family: Meruliaceae
- Genus: Diacanthodes; Singer (1945)

Type species
- Diacanthodes philippinensis (Pat.) Singer (1945)

Species
- D. fluminensis D. griseus D. novoguineensis

Synonyms
- Bornetina L.Mangin & Viala (1903)

Genus of fungi

Diacanthodes is a genus of three species of poroid fungi in the family Meruliaceae.

== Taxonomy ==
The genus was circumscribed by mycologist Rolf Singer in 1945, with Daedalea philippinensis as the type species. This fungus was originally described by French mycologist Narcisse Théophile Patouillard] in 1915 as Daedalea philippinensis.

== Description ==
Fruit bodies of Diacanthodes fungi have circular caps that may be partially funnel-shaped (infundibuliform), and a surface texture ranging from tomentose (covered with densely entangled hairs) to strigose (with stiff, sharp-pointed hairs). The colour of the pore surface is light brown, but it darkens with time.

Diacanthodes has a dimitic hyphal system, meaning it contains both generative hyphae and skeletal hyphae. The generative hyphae have clamp connections; the skeletal hyphae are thick-walled to solid, and have a weak dextrinoid reaction. The spores are broadly ellipsoid, ornamented, and dextrinoid.

Leif Ryvarden suggests that Bondarzewia may be the genus most closely related to Diacanthodes, based on morphological similarities. Both genera feature ornamented spores, the same hyphal system, and similar habit. They differ in microscopic characteristics: Bondartzewia fungi have clampless generative hyphae, no cystidia, and amyloid spores.

== Habitat and distribution ==
Diacanthodes has a pantropical distribution. Its fruit bodies occur on the ground.

== Species ==
- Diacanthodes fluminensis Corner (1989)
- Diacanthodes griseus Corner (1989)
- Diacanthodes novoguineensis (Henn.) O.Fidalgo (1962)
