= Niemelaea =

Scientific classification
- Kingdom: Fungi
- Division: Basidiomycota
- Class: Agaricomycetes
- Order: Polyporales
- Family: Meruliaceae
- Genus: Niemelaea; Zmitr., Ezhov & Khimich (2015)

Type species
- Niemelaea consobrina (Bres.) Zmitr., Ezhov & Khimich (2015)

Species
- N. balaenae N. consobrina N. cremea

Genus of fungi

Niemelaea is a genus of poroid crust fungi in the family Meruliaceae. The genus was circumscribed by Russian mycologists in 2015 to contain three fungi formerly placed in the genus Ceriporiopsis. Niemelaea fungi are characterized by their crust-like fruit body, large, thin-walled angular pores, and a monomitic hyphal system. Spores made by these fungi are ellipsoid and have refractive contents. The genus is named in honour of Finnish mycologist and polypore specialist Tuomo Niemelä, who described the species Ceriporiopsis balaenae.
