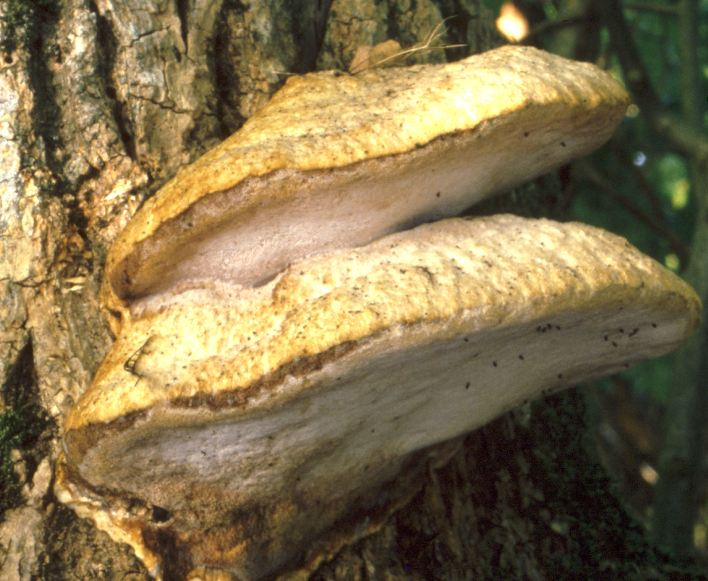
- Aurantiporus fissilis

Scientific classification
- Domain: Eukaryota
- Kingdom: Fungi
- Division: Basidiomycota
- Class: Agaricomycetes
- Order: Polyporales
- Family: Meruliaceae
- Genus: Aurantiporus; Murrill (1905)

Type species
- Aurantiporus pilotae (Schwein.) Murrill (1905)

Species
- A. albidus; A. alborubescens; A. fissilis; A. pilotae; A. transformatus

= Aurantiporus =

Genus of fungi

Aurantiporus is a genus of poroid fungi in the family Meruliaceae. Circumscribed by American mycologist William Alphonso Murrill in 1905, the genus contains five species found mostly in northern temperate regions. Molecular analysis of several Aurantiporus species suggests that the genus is not monophyletic, but some other related polypore species need to be sequenced and studied before appropriate taxonomic changes can be made. In 2018, Viktor Papp and Bálint Dima proposed a new genus Odoria to contain Aurantiporus alborubescens based on multigene phylogenetic analyses. The generic name is derived from the Latin aurantius ("orange") and the Ancient Greek πόρος (pore).

== Species ==
- Aurantiporus albidus Rajchenb. & Cwielong (1995) – Argentina
- Aurantiporus alborubescens (Bourdot & Galzin) H.Jahn (1973) – Europe
- Aurantiporus fissilis (Berk. & M.A.Curtis) H.Jahn ex Ryvarden (1978) – Europe
- Aurantiporus pilotae (Schwein.) Murrill (1905)
- Aurantiporus transformatus (Núñez & Ryvarden) Spirin & Zmitr. (2006)
