= Uncobasidium =

Scientific classification
- Kingdom: Fungi
- Division: Basidiomycota
- Class: Agaricomycetes
- Order: Polyporales
- Family: Meruliaceae
- Genus: Uncobasidium; Hjortstam & Ryvarden (1978)

Type species
- Uncobasidium luteolum Hjortstam & Ryvarden (1978)

Species
- U. luteolum U. roseocremeum

Genus of fungi

Uncobasidium is a genus of two species of crust fungi in the Meruliaceae family . The genus was circumscribed by mycologists Kurt Hjorstam and Leif Ryvarden in 1978 with the European fungus U. luteolum as the type species. The South American species U. roseocremeum was added to the genus in 2012. The distinguishing feature of Uncobasidium is the basal hook in the basidium.

== Description ==
Uncobasidium forms a crust-like fruit body, which is spread out on the surface of the substrate. Its texture is softly membranous or byssoid (as if made of fibers). The hyphal system is monomitic, meaning it contains only generative hyphae. Individual hyphae are distinct when viewed with microscopy, and they range from thin to becoming thick walled, with clamp connections. The hyphae of the subiculum are usually straight and of uniform diameter. In contrast, the hyphae of the subhymenium are twisty and sometimes strongly bent. The basidia (pleurobasidia) are roughly uniform (swollen at the base). They are strongly constricted with a hook-shaped appendage, arising in the basal septum, with four sterigmata. The spores of Uncobasidium fungi are ellipsoid to obovate in shape, thin walled, and non-amyloid.

== Species ==
- Uncobasidium luteolum Hjortstam & Ryvarden (1978)
- Uncobasidium roseocremeum Gorjón, Gresl. & Rajchenb. (2013)

Some species proposed for inclusion in Uncobasidium have been referred to other genera, including:

- Uncobasidium albidum (Hauerslev) Vesterh. (1996) = Aphanobasidium albidum (Hauerslev) Boidin & Gilles (1980)
- Uncobasidium calongei (Tellería) Hjortstam & Tellería (1990) = Cerocorticium calongei Tellería (1985)
- Uncobasidium notabile (H.S.Jacks.) Tellería (1995) = Radulomyces notabilis (H.S.Jacks.) Parmasto (1968)
