= Uncobasidium roseocremeum =

Scientific classification
- Kingdom: Fungi
- Division: Basidiomycota
- Class: Agaricomycetes
- Order: Polyporales
- Family: Meruliaceae
- Genus: Uncobasidium
- Species: U. roseocremeum

Binomial name
- Uncobasidium roseocremeum Gorjón, Gresl. & Rajchenb. (2012)

Species of fungus

Uncobasidium roseocremeum is a species of crust fungus in the family Meruliaceae. Found in South America, it was described as a new species in 2012 by mycologists Sergio Gorjón, Alina Greslebin, and Mario Rajchenberg. The holotype was collected in Nahuel Huapi National Park, Argentina, where it was found growing on the bark of a living tree of Saxegothaea conspicua. The specific epithet roseocremeum refers to the colour of the fruit body—cream with pinkish tints. Microscopic features of the fungus include its basidia that have two sterigma and lateral protuberances, encrusted hyphae that resemble paraphyses, and spherical spores.
