= Crustodontia =

Scientific classification
- Kingdom: Fungi
- Division: Basidiomycota
- Class: Agaricomycetes
- Order: Polyporales
- Family: incertae sedis
- Genus: Crustodontia; Hjortstam & Ryvarden (2005)

Type species
- Crustodontia chrysocreas (Berk. & M.A.Curtis) Hjortstam & Ryvarden (2005)

Synonyms
- Corticium chrysocreas Berk. & M.A.Curtis (1873); Terana chrysocreas (Berk. & M.A.Curtis) Kuntze (1891); Gloeocystidium chrysocreas (Berk. & M.A.Curtis) Takan.Ito (1929); Phlebia chrysocreas (Berk. & M.A.Curtis) Burds. (1975); Amethicium chrysocreas (Berk. & M.A.Curtis) Sheng H.Wu (1990)

Genus of fungi

Crustodontia is a fungal genus of uncertain familial placement in the order Polyporales. The genus was circumscribed in 2005 to contain the crust fungus Crustodontia chrysocreas. This species was originally described as Corticium chrysocreas by Miles Berkeley and Moses Ashley Curtis in 1873. Their description was as follows: "Subiculum bright yellow, thin; hymenium immarginate pallid, or yellow tinged with tawny." Crustodontia has a monomitic hyphal system, meaning it contains only generative hyphae, and these hyphae have clamp connections.

Crustodontia chrysocreas has a pantropical distribution. It has been widely collected, including the United States, Costa Rica, Caribbean Islands, Venezuela, equatorial Africa, Sri Lanka, China, Taiwan, Japan, Hawaii, Brunei, western Australia, and New Zealand. It is rare in Europe; its northernmost recorded collection location (51.7°N) is in Belarus. The fungus causes a white rot in the woody debris of live oak and other hardwoods; it also causes white heart rot in living trees.

Crustodontia is closely related to Phlebia. Molecular analysis places it in the Meruliaceae, in the phlebioid clade.
