= Conohypha =

Scientific classification
- Kingdom: Fungi
- Division: Basidiomycota
- Class: Agaricomycetes
- Order: Polyporales
- Family: Meruliaceae
- Genus: Conohypha; Jülich (1975)

Type species
- Conohypha albocremea (Höhn. & Litsch.) Jülich (1975)

Species
- C. albocremea C. terricola

Genus of fungi

Conohypha is a genus of two species of fungi in the family Meruliaceae. The genus was circumscribed by Swiss mycologist Walter Jülich in 1975. The crust-like fruit bodies of Conohypha are white to cream in colour and membrane-like. The hyphal system is monomitic, meaning it contains only generative hyphae. These hyphae are hyaline with thin walls, and have clamp connections.
