= Cyanodontia =

Scientific classification
- Kingdom: Fungi
- Division: Basidiomycota
- Class: Agaricomycetes
- Order: Polyporales
- Family: Meruliaceae
- Genus: Cyanodontia; Hjortstam (1987)

Type species
- Cyanodontia spathulata Hjortstam (1987)

Genus of fungi

Cyanodontia is a fungal genus in the family Meruliaceae. It is a monotypic genus, circumscribed by mycologist Kurt Hjorstam in 1987 to contain the single species Cyanodontia spathulata. This is a toothed crust fungus that is found in East Africa. The type was collected by Leif Ryvarden in Tanga, Tanzania in 1973.
