= Lilaceophlebia =

Scientific classification
- Kingdom: Fungi
- Division: Basidiomycota
- Class: Agaricomycetes
- Order: Polyporales
- Family: Meruliaceae
- Genus: Lilaceophlebia (Parmasto) Spirin & Zmitr. (2004)

Type species
- Lilaceophlebia livida (Pers.) Spirin & Zmitr. (2004)

Synonyms
- Phlebia sect. Lilaceophlebia Parmasto (1968)

Genus of fungi

Lilaceophlebia is a genus of three species of crust fungi in the family Meruliaceae. The genus was first proposed by Erast Parmasto in 1968 as a section of the genus Phlebia. Viacheslav Spirin and Ivan Zmitrovich elevated the taxon to generic status in 2004.

== Species ==
- Lilaceophlebia georgica (Parmasto) Spirin & Zmitr. (2004)
- Lilaceophlebia ochraceofulva (Bourdot & Galzin) Spirin & Zmitr. (2004)
- Lilaceophlebia tremelloidea (Bres.) Zmitr. (2015)
