= Amauromyces =

Scientific classification
- Kingdom: Fungi
- Division: Basidiomycota
- Class: Agaricomycetes
- Order: Polyporales
- Family: Meruliaceae
- Genus: Amauromyces; Jülich (1978)

Type species
- Amauromyces pallidus Jülich (1978)

Genus of fungi

Amauromyces is a fungal genus in the family Meruliaceae. It is a monotypic genus, containing the single species Amauromyces pallidus.
