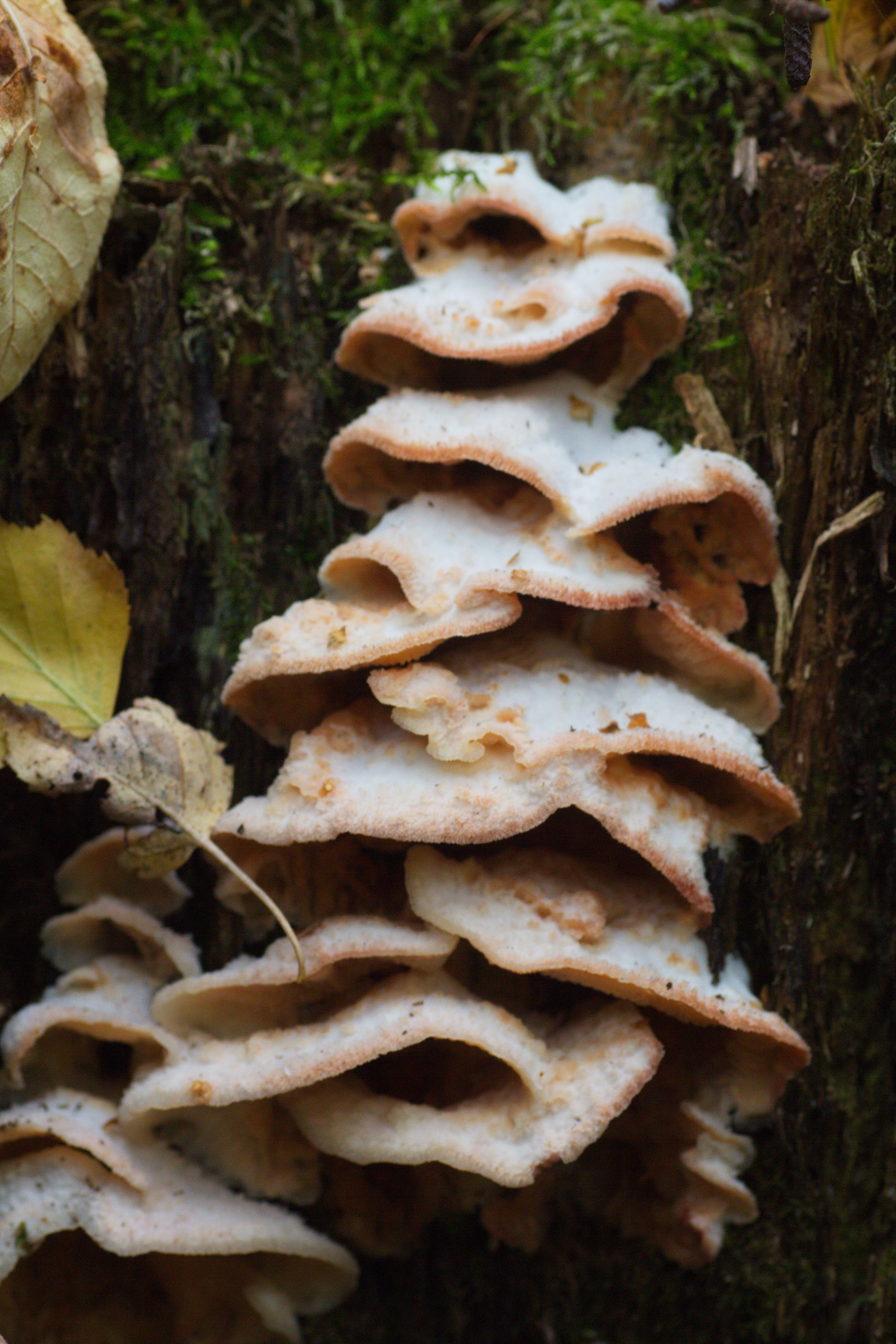

Scientific classification
- Domain: Eukaryota
- Kingdom: Fungi
- Division: Basidiomycota
- Class: Agaricomycetes
- Order: Polyporales
- Family: Meruliaceae
- Genus: Phlebia
- Species: P. tremellosa

Binomial name
- Phlebia tremellosa (Schrad.) Nakasone & Burds. (1984)

Synonyms
- Merulius tremellosus Schrad. (1794); Xylomyzon tremellosum (Schrad.) Pers. (1825); Merulius tremellosus var. spongiosus Fr. (1828); Merulius tremellosus var. pallidus Weinm. (1836); Merulius tremellosus subsp. spongiosus (Fr.) Sacc. (1888); Sesia tremellosa (Schrad.) Kuntze (1891); Merulius spongiosus (Fr.) Mussat (1901); Merulius imbricatus Balf.-Browne (1955)

= Phlebia tremellosa =

Species of fungus

Phlebia tremellosa (formerly Merulius tremellosus), commonly known as trembling Merulius or jelly rot, is a species of fungus in the family Meruliaceae. It is a common and widely distributed wood-decay fungus that grows on the rotting wood of both hardwood and conifer plants.

== Taxonomy ==
The fungus was originally described in 1794 by German botanist Heinrich Adolf Schrader, who called it Merulius tremellosus. Nakasone and Burdsall transferred the taxon to the genus Phlebia in 1984, when they placed Merulius in synonymy.

It is commonly known as the "trembling Merulius", or "jelly rot".

== Description ==
Fruit bodies of the fungus are fan-shaped to semicircular, measuring 2–4 cm (3/4–1 5/8 in) wide by 5–10 cm (2–3 7/8 in) long. They have a spongy to fibrous texture, comprising stalkless caps or spreading crusts. The upper surface, white to pale yellow in colour, can be dry to moist, and hairy to woolly; the margin is usually white to translucent. The undersurface, bearing the fertile hymenium, features radiating to wrinkled ridges and cross veins, and often forms pore-like depressions on mature specimens. Its colour is yellowish orange or pinkish orange. The flesh of this fungus is about 2 mm thick, with a fleshy to gelatinous texture and white to yellowish colour.

The visual similarity of the fungus to bacon gives rise to the Dutch common name bacon-pork rind mushroom, although it is inedible.

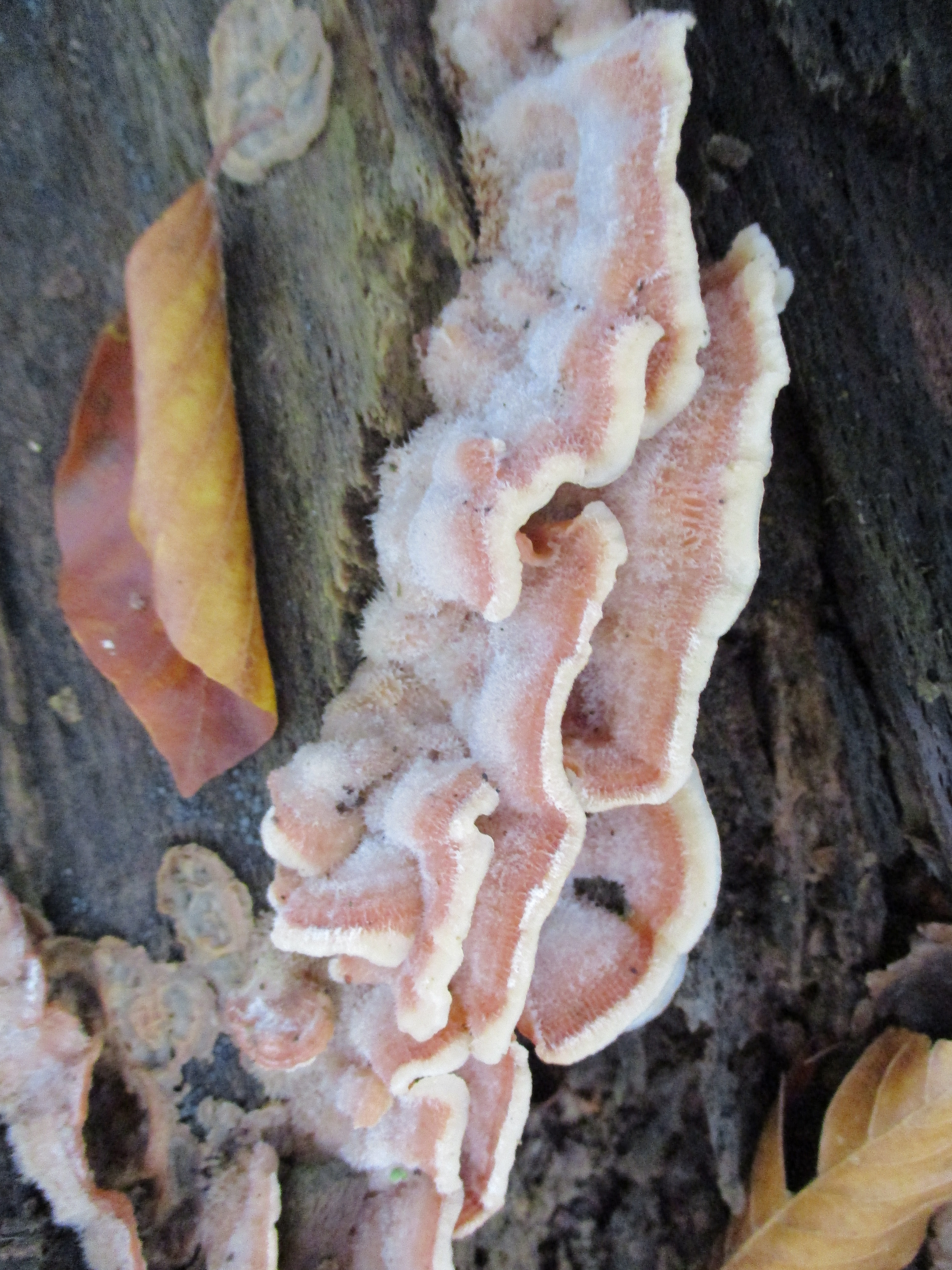
Fruit body resembling bacon

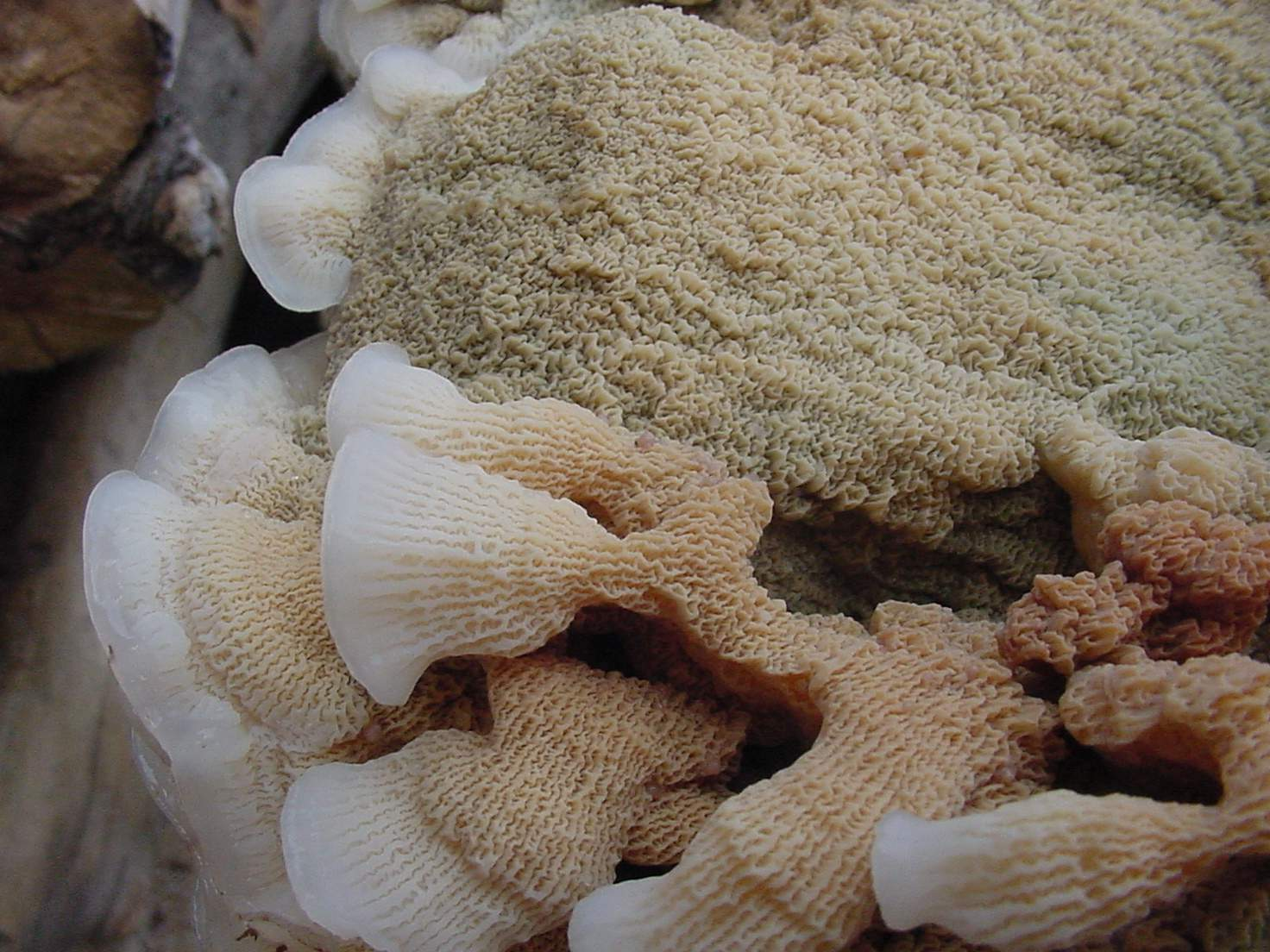
The spore-bearing surface features wrinkled ridges and cross veins.

== Habitat and distribution ==
Phlebia tremellosa is found in Asia, Europe, North Africa, North America, and South America. It is a white rot species that grows on the stumps, fallen branches, and logs of both hardwoods and conifers.
