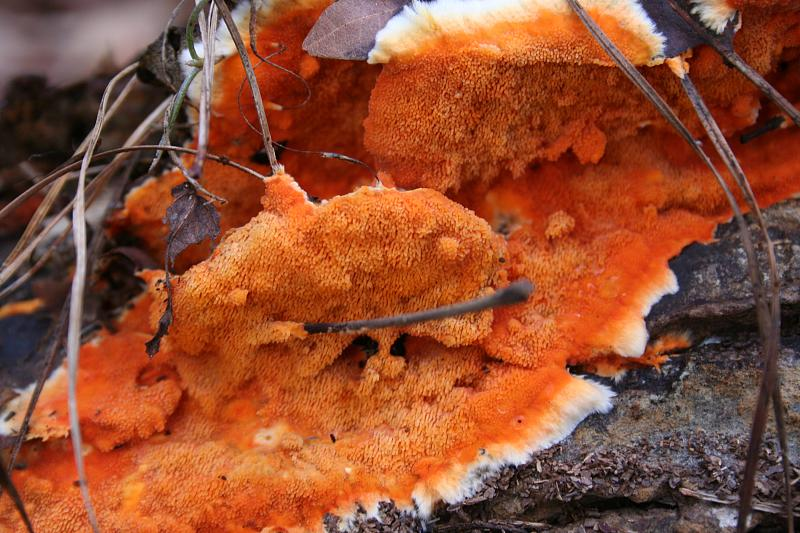
- Hydnophlebia chrysorhiza

Scientific classification
- Kingdom: Fungi
- Division: Basidiomycota
- Class: Agaricomycetes
- Order: Polyporales
- Family: Meruliaceae
- Genus: Hydnophlebia; Parmasto (1967)

Type species
- Hydnophlebia chrysorhiza (Torr.) Parmasto (1967)

Species
- H. canariensis H. chrysorhiza H. gorgonea H. meloi H. omnivora

= Hydnophlebia =

Genus of fungi

Hydnophlebia is a genus of five species of toothed crust fungi in the family Meruliaceae. All species are wood-decay fungi that cause a white rot.

== Taxonomy ==
The genus was circumscribed by Estonian mycologist Erast Parmasto in 1967. The type species, H. chrysorhiza, was originally named Hydnum chrysorhizon by botanist John Torrey in 1822. The genus remained monotypic until Kurt Hjortstam and Leif Ryvarden transferred H. omnivora (previously Hydnum omnivorum Shear) to the genus in 2009. Three species discovered in the Canary Islands and Cape Verde archipelago were added to the genus is 2017.

== Description ==
The fruit bodies of Hydnophlebia are reddish-orange crusts that can be peeled from the substrate. The spore-bearing area (the hymenium) comprises small cylindrical "teeth" up to 1–1.5 mm long. The hyphal system is monomitic, comprising only generative hyphae. Hyphae in the subiculum (a layer of loosely intertwined hyphae on the substrate that supports the fruit body) are thick-walled, hyaline to slightly yellowish, and encrusted. Other hyphae in the fruit body are somewhat to completely hyaline (translucent) and have a wall thickness ranging from thin to moderately thick. Cystidia are sparse and tubular, hyaline, thin-walled or have a slight wall thickening. The spores are ellipsoid, smooth, thin-walled, and generally measure up to 4–5 μm long.

== Species ==
- Hydnophlebia canariensis Telleria, M.Dueñas & M.P.Martín (2017)
- Hydnophlebia chrysorhiza (Torr.) Parmasto (1967)
- Hydnophlebia gorgonea Telleria, M.Dueñas & M.P.Martín (2017)
- Hydnophlebia meloi Telleria, M.Dueñas & M.P.Martín (2017)
- Hydnophlebia omnivora (Shear) Hjortstam & Ryvarden (2009)
