= Stegiacantha =

Scientific classification
- Kingdom: Fungi
- Division: Basidiomycota
- Class: Agaricomycetes
- Order: Polyporales
- Family: Meruliaceae
- Genus: Stegiacantha; Maas Geest. (1966)

Type species
- Stegiacantha petaloides (Lloyd) Maas Geest. (1966)

Synonyms
- Hydnum petaloides Lloyd (1913)

Genus of fungi

Stegiacantha is a fungal genus in the family Meruliaceae. It is a monotypic genus, containing the single species Stegiacantha petaloides, found in Madagascar. This fungus was first described by American mycologist Curtis Gates Lloyd in 1913 as Hydnum petaloides. Rudolph Arnold Maas Geesteranus circumscribed Stegiacantha to contain the fungus in 1966.

Stegiacantha petaloides has an orbicular cap (in the shape of a flattened disc) measuring 1–2 cm (0.4–0.8 in) in diameter, and a slender stipe. It has yellowish spines covering its hymenium.
