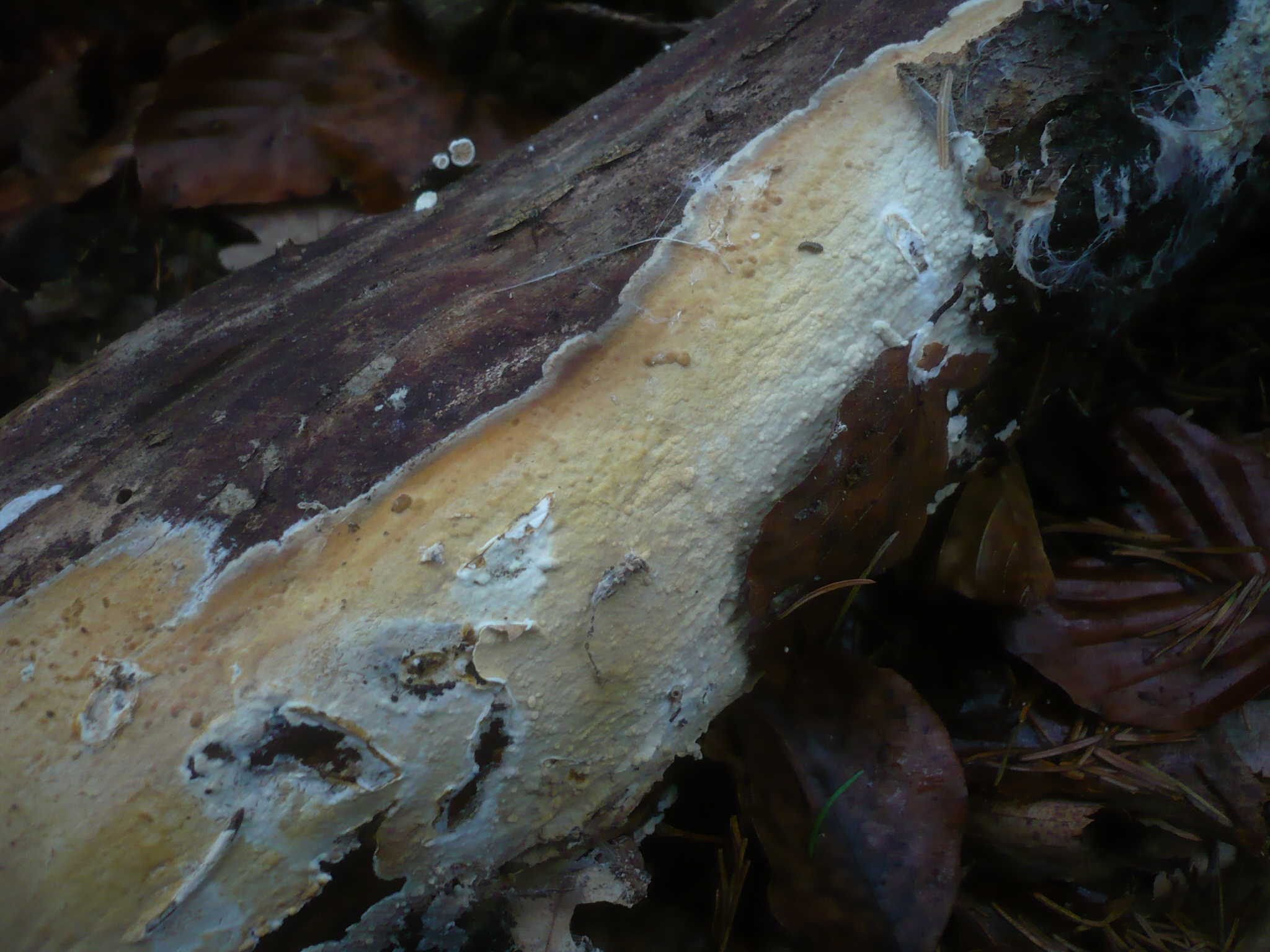
- Hypochnicium bombycinum

Scientific classification
- Kingdom: Fungi
- Division: Basidiomycota
- Class: Agaricomycetes
- Order: Polyporales
- Family: Meruliaceae
- Genus: Hypochnicium; J.Erikss. (1958)

Type species
- Hypochnicium bombycinum (Sommerf.) J.Erikss. (1958)

= Hypochnicium =

Genus of fungi

Hypochnicium is a genus of corticioid fungi in the family Meruliaceae. The genus was circumscribed by mycologist John Eriksson in 1958.

== Species ==
- Hypochnicium albostramineum (Bres.) Hallenb. (1985)
- Hypochnicium aotearoae B.C.Paulus, H.Nilsson & Hallenb. (2007)
- Hypochnicium bombycinum (Sommerf.) J.Erikss. (1958)
- Hypochnicium capitulatum Boidin & Gilles (2000)
- Hypochnicium caucasicum Parmasto (1967)
- Hypochnicium cremicolor (Bres.) H.Nilsson & Hallenb. (2003)
- Hypochnicium cymosum (D.P.Rogers & H.S.Jacks.) K.H.Larss. & Hjortstam (1977)
- Hypochnicium cystidiatum Boidin & Gilles (1971)
- Hypochnicium eichleri (Bres. ex Sacc. & P.Syd.) J.Erikss. & Ryvarden (1976)
- Hypochnicium erikssonii Hallenb. & Hjortstam (1990)
- Hypochnicium flexibile (G.Cunn.) Gorjón & Gresl. (2012)
- Hypochnicium geogenium (Bres.) J.Erikss. (1958)
- Hypochnicium globosum Sheng H.Wu 1990)
- Hypochnicium gomezii S.E.López & J.E.Wright (1985)
- Hypochnicium guineense Tellería, M.Dueñas, Melo & M.P.Martín (2010)
- Hypochnicium horridulum (Rick) Baltazarr & Rajchenb. (2016)
- Hypochnicium huinayensis Tellería, M.Dueñas & M.P.Martín (2013)
- Hypochnicium longicystidiosum (S.S.Rattan) Hjortstam & Ryvarden (1984)
- Hypochnicium lundellii (Bourdot) J.Erikss. (1958)
- Hypochnicium lyndoniae (D.A.Reid) Hjortstam (1995)
- Hypochnicium michelii Tellería, M.Dueñas, Melo & M.P.Martín (2010)
- Hypochnicium multiforme (Berk. & Broome) Hjortstam (1998)
- Hypochnicium novae-zelandiae (G.Cunn.) Gorjón & Gresl. (2012)
- Hypochnicium odontioidescens Boidin & Gilles (2000)
- Hypochnicium patagonicum Gorjón & Hallenb. (2013) – Chile
- Hypochnicium pini Y.Jang & J.J.Kim (2013) – East Asia
- Hypochnicium pseudoprosopidis Boidin & Gilles (2000)
- Hypochnicium punctulatum (Cooke) J.Erikss. (1958)
- Hypochnicium sphaerosporum (Höhn. & Litsch.) J.Erikss. (1958)
- Hypochnicium stratosum Burds. & Nakasone (1983)
- Hypochnicium subrigescens Boidin (1971)
- Hypochnicium wakefieldiae (Bres.) J.Erikss. (1958)
