= Hyphodontiastra =

Scientific classification
- Kingdom: Fungi
- Division: Basidiomycota
- Class: Agaricomycetes
- Order: Polyporales
- Family: Meruliaceae
- Genus: Hyphodontiastra; Hjortstam (1999)

Type species
- Hyphodontiastra virgicola Hjortstam & Melo (1999)

Genus of fungi

Hyphodontiastra is a fungal genus in the family Meruliaceae. It is a monotypic genus containing the single species Hyphodontiastra virgicola, a crust fungus found in Brazil.
