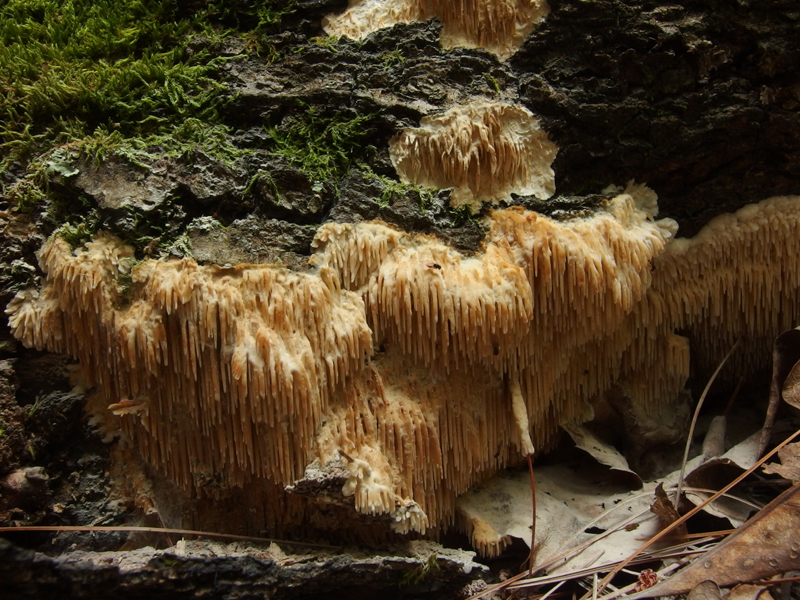
- Radulodon copelandii

Scientific classification
- Kingdom: Fungi
- Division: Basidiomycota
- Class: Agaricomycetes
- Order: Polyporales
- Family: Meruliaceae
- Genus: Radulodon; Ryvarden (1972)

Type species
- Radulodon americanus Ryvarden (1972)

= Radulodon =

Genus of fungi

Radulodon is a genus of toothed crust fungi in the family Meruliaceae. The genus was circumscribed in 1972 by Norwegian mycologist Leif Ryvarden, with R. americanus as the type species.

== Species ==
- Radulodon acaciae G.Kaur, Avneet P.Singh & Dhingra (2014) – India
- Radulodon americanus Ryvarden (1972)
- Radulodon aneirinus (Sommerf.) Spirin (2001)
- Radulodon casearius (Morgan) Ryvarden (1972)
- Radulodon cirrhatinus Hjortstam & Spooner (1990) – Malaysia
- Radulodon copelandii (Pat.) N.Maek. (1993)
- Radulodon erikssonii Ryvarden (1972)
- Radulodon indicus Jyoti & Dhingra (2014)
- Radulodon licentii (Pilát) Ryvarden (1976)
- Radulodon revolubilis Hjortstam & Ryvarden (2007) – Venezuela
- Radulodon subvinosus (Berk. & Broome) Stalpers (1998)
