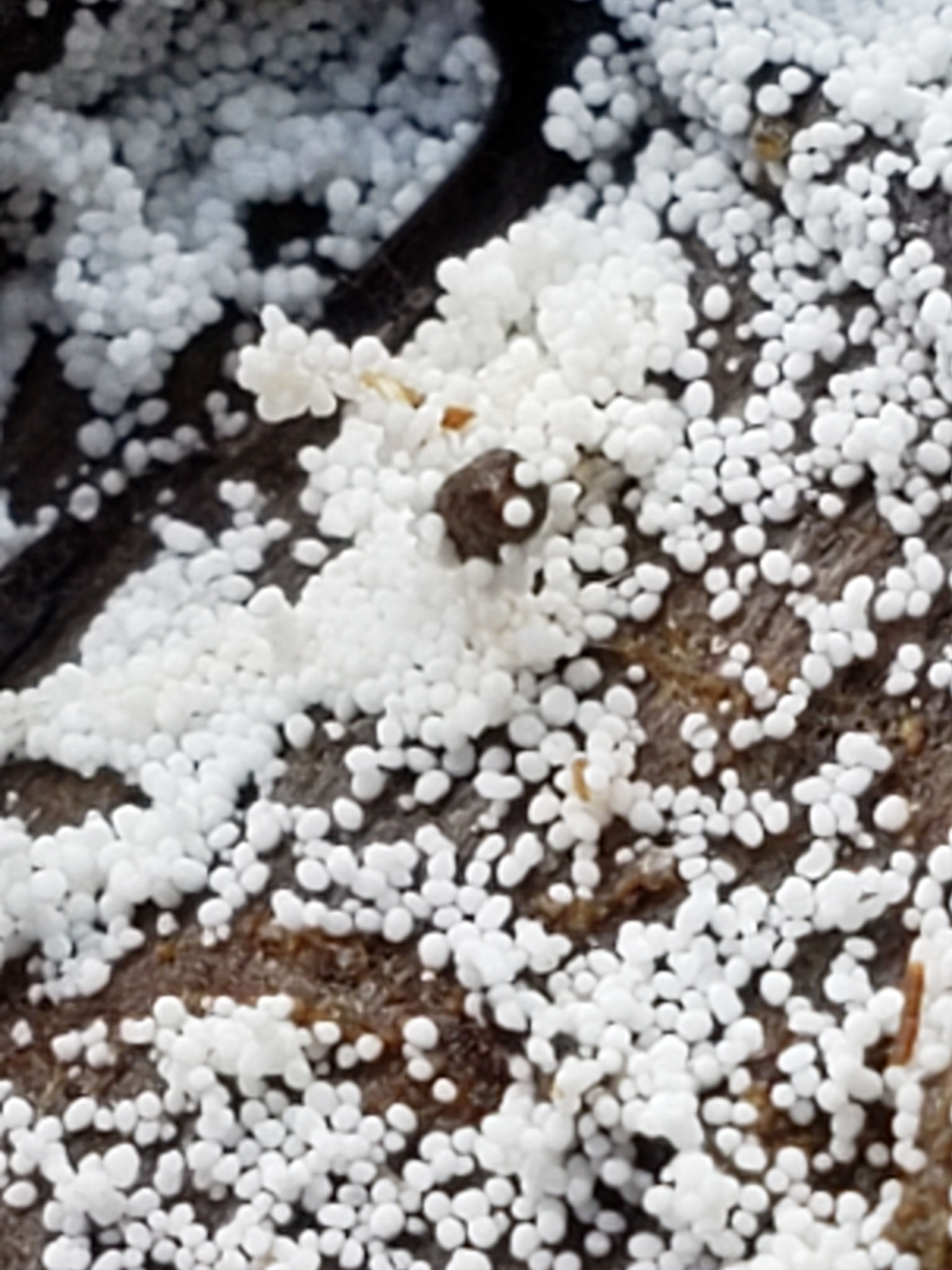

Scientific classification
- Kingdom: Fungi
- Division: Basidiomycota
- Class: Agaricomycetes
- Order: Polyporales
- Genus: Bulbillomyces; Jülich (1974)
- Species: B. farinosus

Binomial name
- Bulbillomyces farinosus (Bres.) Jülich (1974)

Synonyms
- Kneiffia farinosa Bres. (1903)

= Bulbillomyces =

Single-species fungal genus

Bulbillomyces is a fungal genus of uncertain familial placement in the order Polyporales. Bulbillomyces is monotypic, containing the single species Bulbillomyces farinosus, a crust fungus. The genus was circumscribed by the Swiss mycologist Walter Jülich in 1974. The fungus was reported as new to Japan in 2002.
