= Cerocorticium molle =

Scientific classification
- Kingdom: Fungi
- Division: Basidiomycota
- Class: Agaricomycetes
- Order: Polyporales
- Family: Meruliaceae
- Genus: Cerocorticium
- Species: C. molle

Binomial name
- Cerocorticium molle (Berk. & M.A.Curtis) Jülich (1975)

Synonyms
- Corticium molle Berk. & M.A.Curtis (1868); Corticium armeniacum Sacc. (1888); Terana armeniaca (Sacc.) Kuntze (1891); Cerocorticium bogoriense Henn. & E.Nyman (1900); Cerocorticium tjibodense Henn. & E.Nyman (1900); Chrysoderma alboluteum Boidin & Gilles (1991); Corticium ceraceum Berk. & Ravenel ex Massee (1890); Corticium aureolum Bres. (1911)

Species of fungus

Cerocorticium molle is a species of crust fungus in the family Meruliaceae.

== Taxonomy ==
The fungus was first described by Miles Berkeley and Moses Ashley Curtis in 1868 as Corticium molle. They described the fruit body of the type specimen as resembling "a thin coating of wax poured over the surface". It was transferred to genus Cerocorticium by Walter Jülich in 1975.

== Habitat and distribution ==
Cerocorticium molle grows on the dead bark and wood of a variety of angiosperms, and it has occasionally been recorded growing on or under the bark of living trees. It is found in tropical and subtropical regions of Africa, Asia, North America, and South America.
