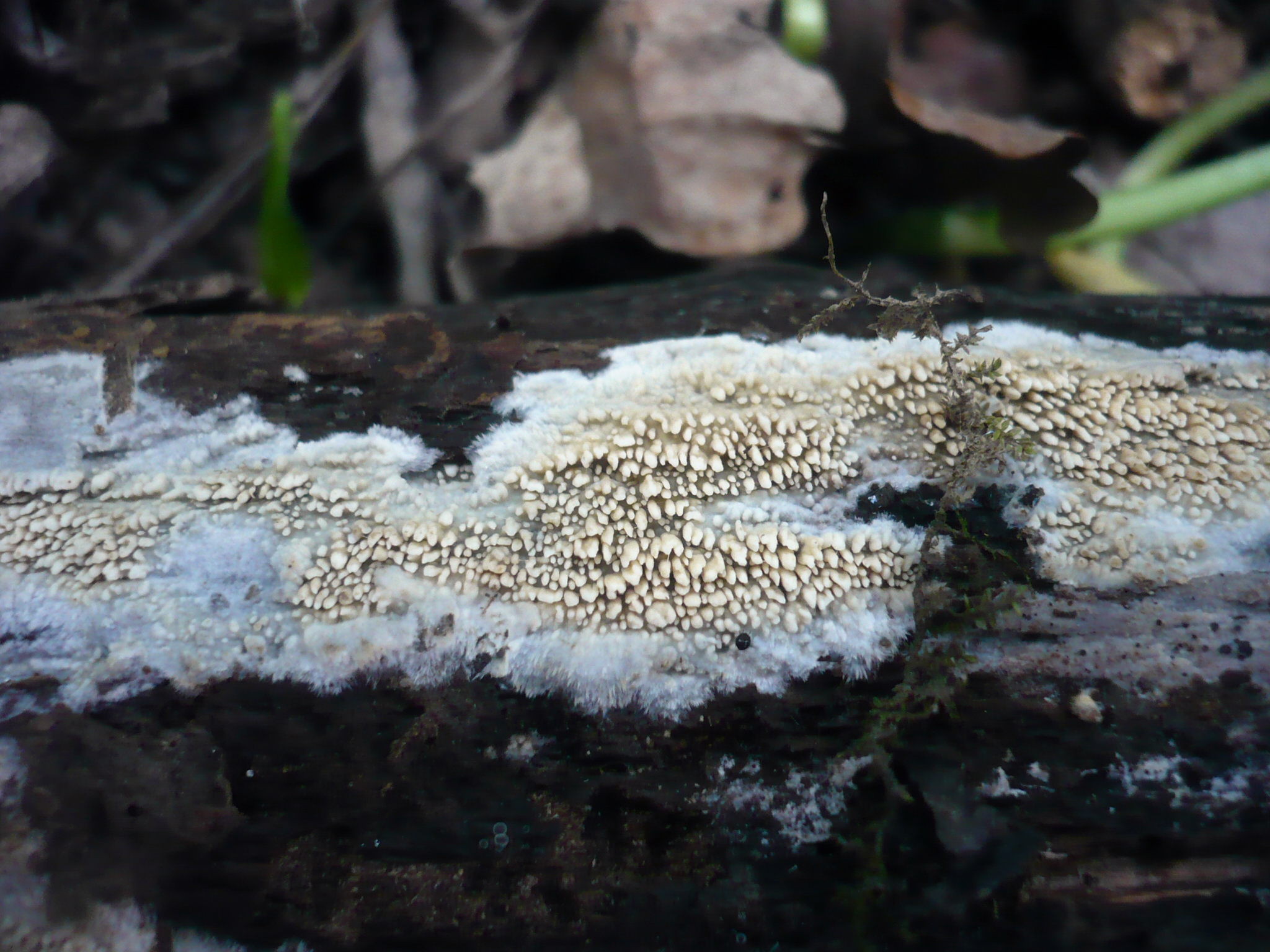
- Mycoacia nothofagi

Scientific classification
- Domain: Eukaryota
- Kingdom: Fungi
- Division: Basidiomycota
- Class: Agaricomycetes
- Order: Polyporales
- Family: Meruliaceae
- Genus: Mycoacia; Donk (1931)

Type species
- Mycoacia fuscoatra (Fr.) Donk (1931)

Synonyms
- Acia P.Karst. (1879)

= Mycoacia =

Genus of fungi

Mycoacia is a genus of toothed crust fungi in the family Meruliaceae. It was circumscribed by Dutch mycologist Marinus Anton Donk in 1931.

== Species ==
As of June 2017, Index Fungorum accepts 18 species of Mycoacia:

- Mycoacia angustata H.S.Yuan (2012) – China
- Mycoacia aurea (Fr.) J.Erikss. & Ryvarden (1976) – Europe
- Mycoacia austro-occidentalis Canf. (1976)
- Mycoacia bulliardii (Nikol.) Parmasto (1967)
- Mycoacia chrysella (Berk. & M.A.Curtis) H.Furuk. (1974)
- Mycoacia flava (Cejp) Parmasto (1967)
- Mycoacia fuscoatra (Fr.) Donk (1931)
- Mycoacia heterocystidia (Sheng H.Wu) Spirin & Zmitr. (2004) – Taiwan
- Mycoacia kurilensis Parmasto (1967)
- Mycoacia lutea (G.Cunn.) Hjortstam (1995)
- Mycoacia meridionalis Burds. & Nakasone (1981)
- Mycoacia nothofagi (G.Cunn.) Ryvarden (1981) – Europe; New Zealand; Asia
- Mycoacia odontoidea (Sheng H.Wu) Spirin & Zmitr. (2004)
- Mycoacia rubiginosa Hjortstam & Ryvarden (2004) – Colombia
- Mycoacia squalina (Fr.) M.P.Christ. (1960)
- Mycoacia stenodon (Pers.) Donk (1931)
- Mycoacia subconspersa (Rick) Hjortstam & Ryvarden (1982)
- Mycoacia uda (Fr.) Donk (1931) – Europe
