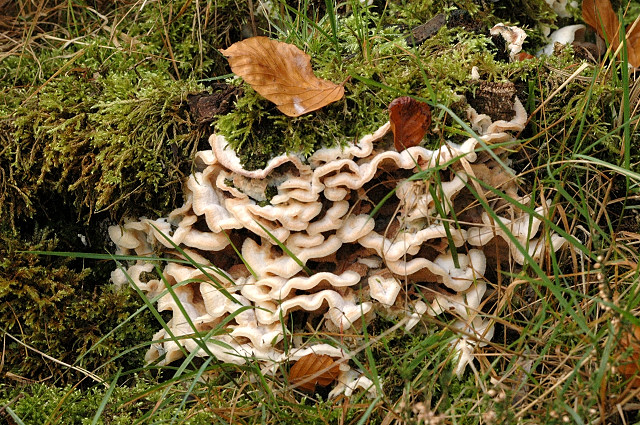
- Merulius tremellosus

Scientific classification
- Domain: Eukaryota
- Kingdom: Fungi
- Division: Basidiomycota
- Class: Agaricomycetes
- Order: Polyporales
- Family: Meruliaceae
- Genus: Merulius; Fr. (1821)

Type species
- Merulius tremellosus Schrad. (1794)

Species
- M. debriscola M. tremellosus

Synonyms
- Merulius Haller ex Boehm. (1760); Hyponevris Paulet (1808); Trabecularia Bonord. (1857)

= Merulius =

Genus of fungi

Merulius is a genus of poroid fungi in the family Meruliaceae. As of October 2017, Index Fungorum accepts two species in Merulius: M. debriscola, and the type, M. tremellosus.
