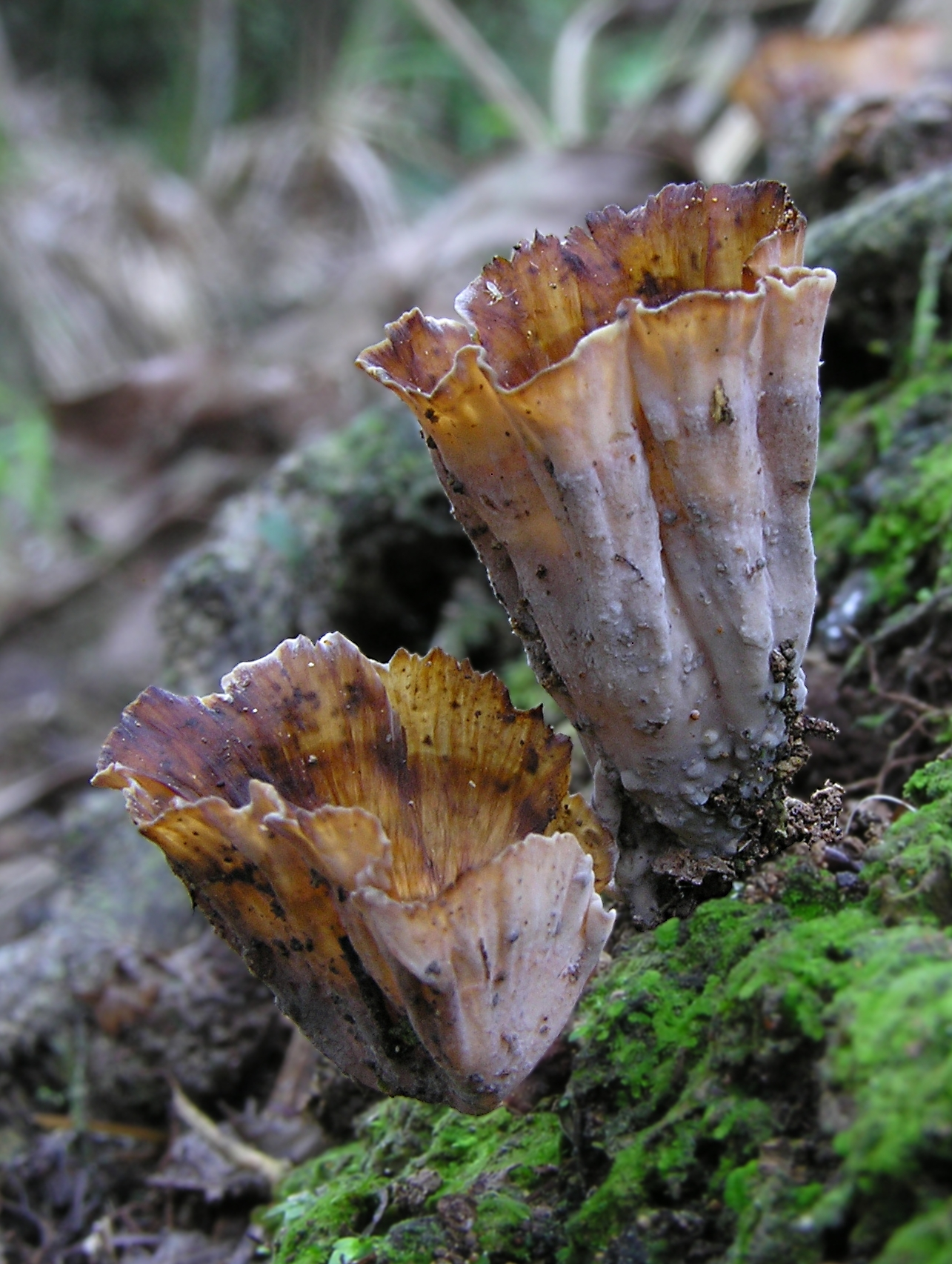
- Podoscypha petalodes

Scientific classification
- Kingdom: Fungi
- Division: Basidiomycota
- Class: Agaricomycetes
- Order: Polyporales
- Family: Meruliaceae
- Genus: Podoscypha; Pat. (1900)

Type species
- Podoscypha surinamensis (Lév.) Pat. (1900)

Species
- ~35

Synonyms
- Stereogloeocystidium Rick (1940)

= Podoscypha =

Genus of fungi

Podoscypha is a genus of fungi in the family Meruliaceae. The genus has a widespread distribution, especially in tropical regions, and contains about 35 species.

== Species ==
- Podoscypha aculeata (Berk. & M.A.Curtis) Boidin (1959)
- Podoscypha bolleana (Mont.) Boidin (1960)
- Podoscypha brasiliensis D.A.Reid (1965)
- Podoscypha bubalina D.A.Reid (1965)
- Podoscypha caespitosa (Burt) Boidin (1959)
- Podoscypha corbiformis (Fr.) D.A.Reid (1965)
- Podoscypha corneri D.A.Reid (1965)
- Podoscypha crenata (Lév.) Pat. (1900)
- Podoscypha cristata (Berk. & M.A.Curtis) D.A.Reid (1965)
- Podoscypha disseminata Douanla-Meli (2004)
- Podoscypha elegans (G.Mey.) Pat. (1900)
- Podoscypha fulvonitens (Berk.) D.A.Reid (1965)
- Podoscypha gillesii Boidin & Lanq. (1973)
- Podoscypha glabrescens (Berk. & M.A.Curtis) Boidin (1959)
- Podoscypha involuta (Klotzsch) Imazeki (1952)
- Podoscypha macrorhiza (Lév.) Pat. (1900)
- Podoscypha mellissii (Berk. ex Sacc.) Bres. (1928)
- Podoscypha moelleri (Bres. & Henn.) D.A.Reid (1965)
- Podoscypha moselei (Berk.) D.A.Reid (1965)
- Podoscypha multizonata (Berk. & Broome) Pat. (1928)
- Podoscypha nitidula (Berk.) Pat. (1903)
- Podoscypha nuda Boidin (1966)
- Podoscypha obliquula (S.Ito & S.Imai) S.Ito (1955)
- Podoscypha ovalispora D.A.Reid (1965)
- Podoscypha parvula (Lloyd) D.A.Reid (1965)
- Podoscypha petalodes (Berk.) Boidin (1959)
- Podoscypha philippinensis D.A.Reid (1965)
- Podoscypha poilanei Pat. (1928)
- Podoscypha pusillum (Berk.) Ryvarden (2015)
- Podoscypha ravenelii (Berk. & M.A.Curtis) Pat. (1900)
- Podoscypha replicata (Lloyd) D.A.Reid (1965)
- Podoscypha sergentiorum Maire (1917)
- Podoscypha thozetii (Berk.) Boidin (1959)
- Podoscypha tomentipes (Overh.) D.A.Reid (1965)
- Podoscypha ursina Boidin & Berthet (1960)
- Podoscypha venustula (Speg.) D.A.Reid (1965)
- Podoscypha vespillonea (Berk.) Boidin & Lanq. (1973)
- Podoscypha warneckeana (Henn.) Ryvarden (1997)
- Podoscypha xanthopus-concinna (Lloyd) D.A. Reid (1975)
