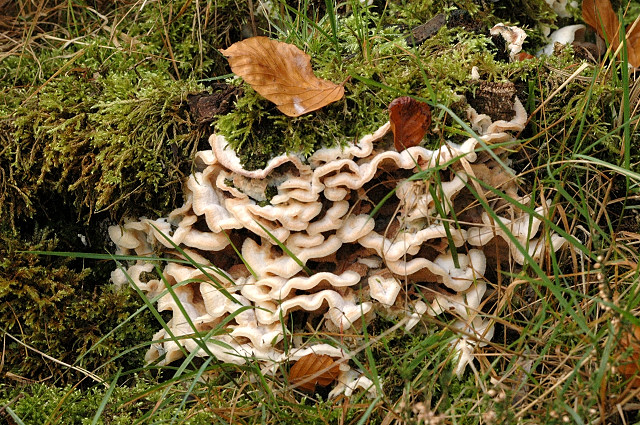
- Phlebia tremellosa, member of the Meruliaceae

Scientific classification
- Kingdom: Fungi
- Division: Basidiomycota
- Class: Agaricomycetes
- Order: Polyporales
- Family: Meruliaceae; Rea (1922)

Type genus
- Merulius Fr. (1821)

Synonyms
- Climacodontaceae Jülich (1981); Phlebiaceae Jülich (1981)

= Meruliaceae =

Family of fungi

The Meruliaceae are a family of fungi in the order Polyporales. According to a 2008 estimate, the family contains 47 genera and 420 species. As of April 2018, Index Fungorum accepts 645 species in the family.

== Taxonomy ==
The family was formally circumscribed by English mycologist Carleton Rea in 1922, with Merulius as the type genus. He also included the genera Phlebia, Coniophora (now placed in the Coniophoraceae), and Coniophorella (now considered a synonym of Coniophora). His description of the Meruliaceae was as follows: "Hymenium spread over veins, anastomosing pores, or quite smooth; edge of veins or pores fertile." Several genera formerly classified in the Meruliaceae were moved to the family Steccherinaceae based on molecular evidence.

== Description ==
Meruliaceae species are crust-like or polyporoid, and often have a waxy appearance when dry. Their hyphal systems are monomitic (containing only tightly arranged generative hyphae), and these hyphae have clamp connections. The spores are smooth, thin-walled, and hyaline (translucent). Cystidia are often present in the hymenium. Although rare, some species have a dimitic hyphal system (with both generative and skeletal hyphae). Meruliaceae fungi cause white rot.

== Genera ==
- Abortiporus Murrill (1904) – 3 species
- Amaurohydnum Jülich (1978) – 1 species
- Amauromyces Jülich (1978) – 1 species
- Aquascypha D.A.Reid (1965) – 1 species
- Aurantiopileus Ginns, D.L.Lindner & T.J.Baroni (2010)
- Aurantiporus Murrill (1905) – 5 species
- Bjerkandera P.Karst. (1879) – 7 species
- Bulbillomyces Jülich (1974) – 1 species
- Cerocorticium Henn. (1900) – 7 species
- Chrysoderma Boidin & Gilles (1991) – 1 species
- Climacodon P.Karst. (1881) – 7 species
- Columnodontia Jülich (1979) – 1 species
- Conohypha Jülich (1975) – 2 species
- Coralloderma D.A.Reid (1965) – 3 species
- Crustoderma Parmasto (1968) – 18 species
- Crustodontia Hjortstam & Ryvarden (2005) – 1 species
- Cyanodontia Hjortstam (1987) – 1 species
- Cymatoderma Jungh. (1840) – 1 species
- Diacanthodes Singer (1945) – 3 species
- Elaphroporia Z.Q.Wu & C.L.Zhao (2018) – 1 species
- Gyrophanopsis Jülich (1979) – 2 species
- Hydnophanerochaete Sheng H. Wu & Che C. Chen (2018)– 1 species
- Hydnophlebia Parmasto (1967)– 2 species
- Hyphoderma Wallr. (1833) – 104 species
- Hyphodontiastra Hjortstam (1999) – 1 species
- Hypochnicium J.Erikss. (1958) – 35 species
- Lilaceophlebia (Parmasto) Spirin & Zmitr. (2004) – 3 species
- Luteoporia F.Wu, Jia J.Chen & S.H.He (2016) – 1 species
- Merulius Fr. (1821) – 2 species
- Mycoacia Donk (1931) – 17 species
- Mycoaciella J.Erikss. & Ryvarden (1978) – 5 species
- Mycoleptodonoides Nikol. (1952) – 6 species
- Niemelaea Zmitr., Ezhov & Khimich (2015) – 3 species
- Odoria V.Papp & Dima (2018) – 1 species
- Phlebia Fr. (1821) – 89 species
- Phlebiporia Jia J.Chen, B.K.Cui & Y.C.Dai (2014) – 1 species
- Pirex Hjortstam & Ryvarden (1985) – 1 species
- Podoscypha Pat. (1900) – 39 species
- Radulodon Ryvarden (1972) – 11 species
- Sarcodontia Schulzer (1866) – 6 species
- Scopuloides (Massee) Höhn. & Litsch. (1908) – 5 species
- Stegiacantha Maas Geest. (1966) – 1 species
- Trullella Ting Cao & H.S. Yuan (2021) – 8 species
- Uncobasidium Hjortstam & Ryvarden (1978) – 2 species
