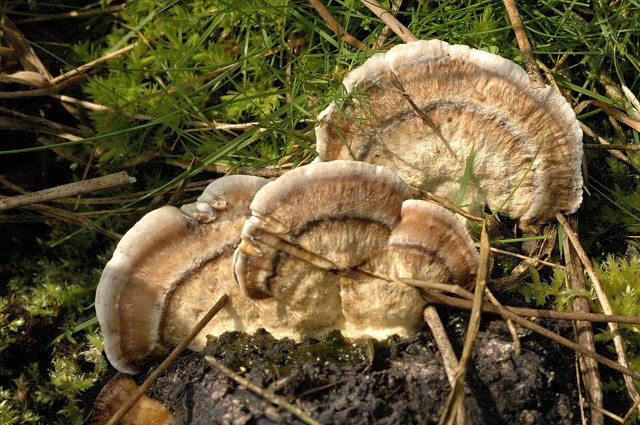

Scientific classification
- Kingdom: Fungi
- Division: Basidiomycota
- Class: Agaricomycetes
- Order: Polyporales
- Family: Phanerochaetaceae
- Genus: Bjerkandera
- Species: B. adusta

Binomial name
- Bjerkandera adusta (Willd.) P.Karst. (1880)

= Bjerkandera adusta =

Species of fungus

Bjerkandera adusta
- Mycological characteristics
- Pores on hymenium
- No distinct cap
- Hymenium attachment is irregular or not applicable
- Lacks a stipe
- Spore print is white
- Ecology is saprotrophic
- Edibility is inedible

Bjerkandera adusta, commonly known as the smoky polypore or smoky bracket, is a species of fungus in the family Phanerochaetaceae. It is a plant pathogen that causes white rot in live trees, but most commonly appears on dead wood.

== Taxonomy ==
The species was first described scientifically as Boletus adustus by Carl Ludwig Willdenow in 1787. The genome sequence of Bjerkandera adusta was reported in 2013.

== Description ==
The fungus grows in shelflike fruit bodies which often overlap. The caps are up to 7 centimetres (2 3/4 in) wide and 6 millimetres (1/4 in) thick, tomentose to hairy, and buff in colour.

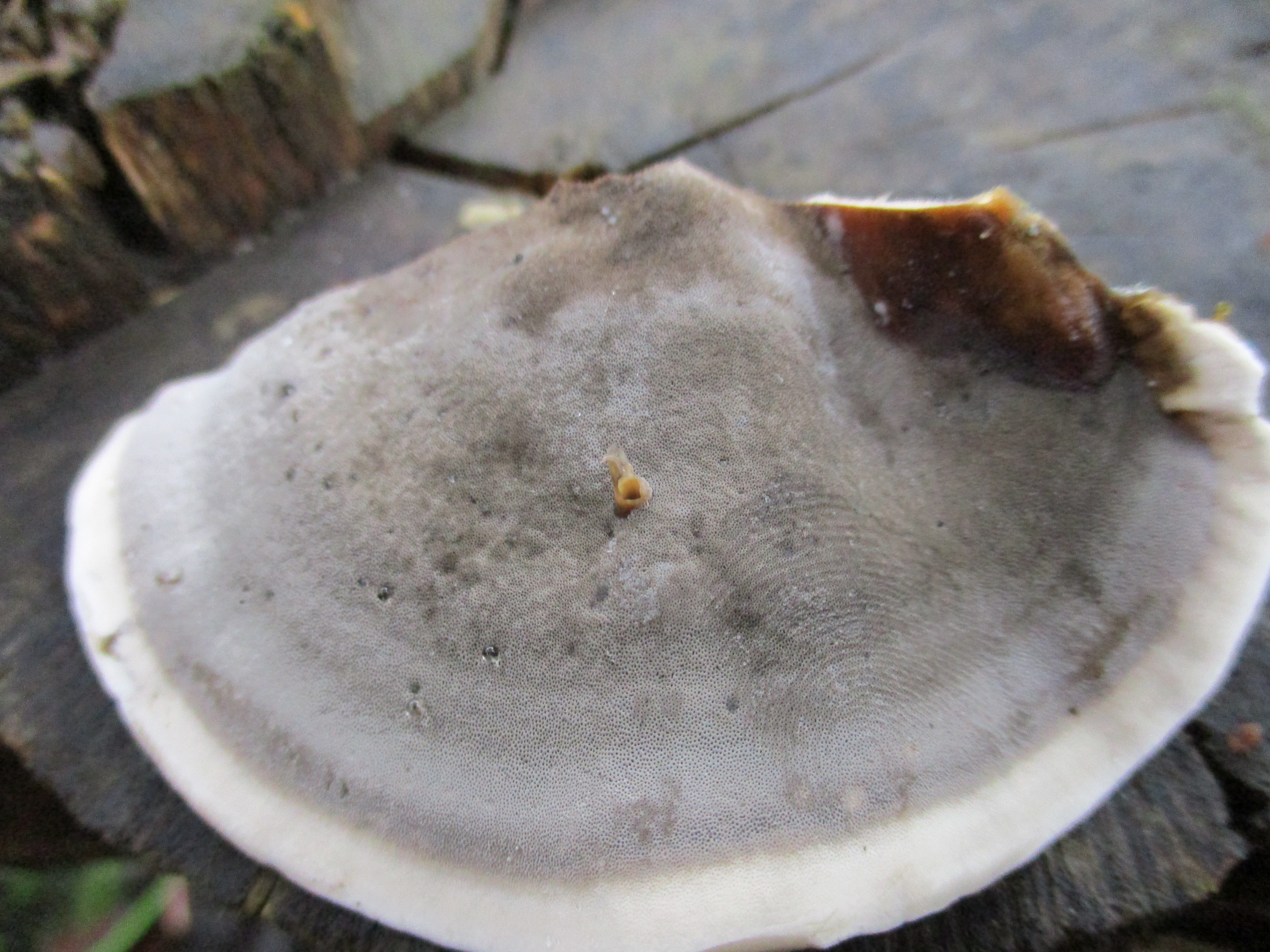
Bottom view with pores (tubes) visible

=== Similar species ===
Bjerkandera fumosa is similar; its flesh has a dark line near the base of the tubes. Some members of the genera Stereum and Trametes are also similar.

== Habitat ==
The species is often found on decaying wood.

== Potential uses ==
The species is inedible.

Because it produces enzymes that can degrade polycyclic aromatic hydrocarbons, such as those used in synthetic textile dyes, there has been research interest in investigating the fungus for possible use in bioremediation. The research on these lignin-degrading enzymes produced by Bjerkandera adusta, such as versatile peroxidase, has also shown in studies to be able to decolorize synthetic melanin. This feature may allow Bjerkandera adusta to be utilized for melanin decolorization in future cosmetic applications.
