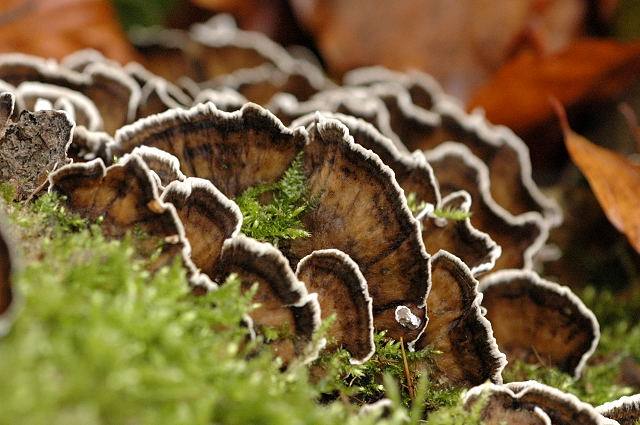
- Bjerkandera adusta

Scientific classification
- Domain: Eukaryota
- Kingdom: Fungi
- Division: Basidiomycota
- Class: Agaricomycetes
- Order: Polyporales
- Family: Phanerochaetaceae
- Genus: Bjerkandera; P.Karst. (1879)

Type species
- Bjerkandera adusta (Willd.) P.Karst. (1879)

Species
- B. adusta B. atroalba B. centroamericana B. ecuadorensis B. fulgida B. fumosa B. mikrofumosa B. minispora B. resupinata B. subsimulans B. terebrans

Synonyms
- Myriadoporus Peck (1884)

= Bjerkandera =

Genus of fungi

Bjerkandera is a genus of wood-rotting fungi in the family Phanerochaetaceae.

== Taxonomy ==
The genus was circumscribed by Finnish mycologist Petter Adolf Karsten in 1879. The type species, B. adusta, was originally described as Boletus adustus by Carl Ludwig Willdenow in 1787. The generic name honours Swedish naturalist Clas Bjerkander. Karsten included seven species in addition to the type: B. dichroa, B. amorpha, B. fumosa, B. kymatodes, B. diffusa, and B. isabellina. Most of those species have been since moved to different genera or synonymized.

In a 1913 survey of polypore genera, Adeline Ames included B. adusta, B. fumosa, and B. puberula; the latter fungus is now placed in Abortiporus. Marinus Anton Donk included only B. adusta and B. fumosa in a 1974 publication. Some authors have suggested to merge these two species into other genera, such as Gloeoporus, Tyromyces, or Grifola. Molecular phylogenetic analysis has demonstrated that the two traditional Bjerkandera fungi form a monophyletic group that is sister to the crust fungus Terana coerulea. The little-known Cuban species B. subsimulans and B. terebrans, both originally described by Miles Berkeley and Moses Ashley Curtis, were transferred to Bjerkandera by William Alphonso Murrill in 1907, and are accepted as valid species by Index Fungorum. Bjerkandera atroalba and B. centroamericana are two neotropical species that were transferred to Bjerkandera, and described as new, respectively, in 2015. In 2021 four new species were added from South America and Asia.

== Description ==
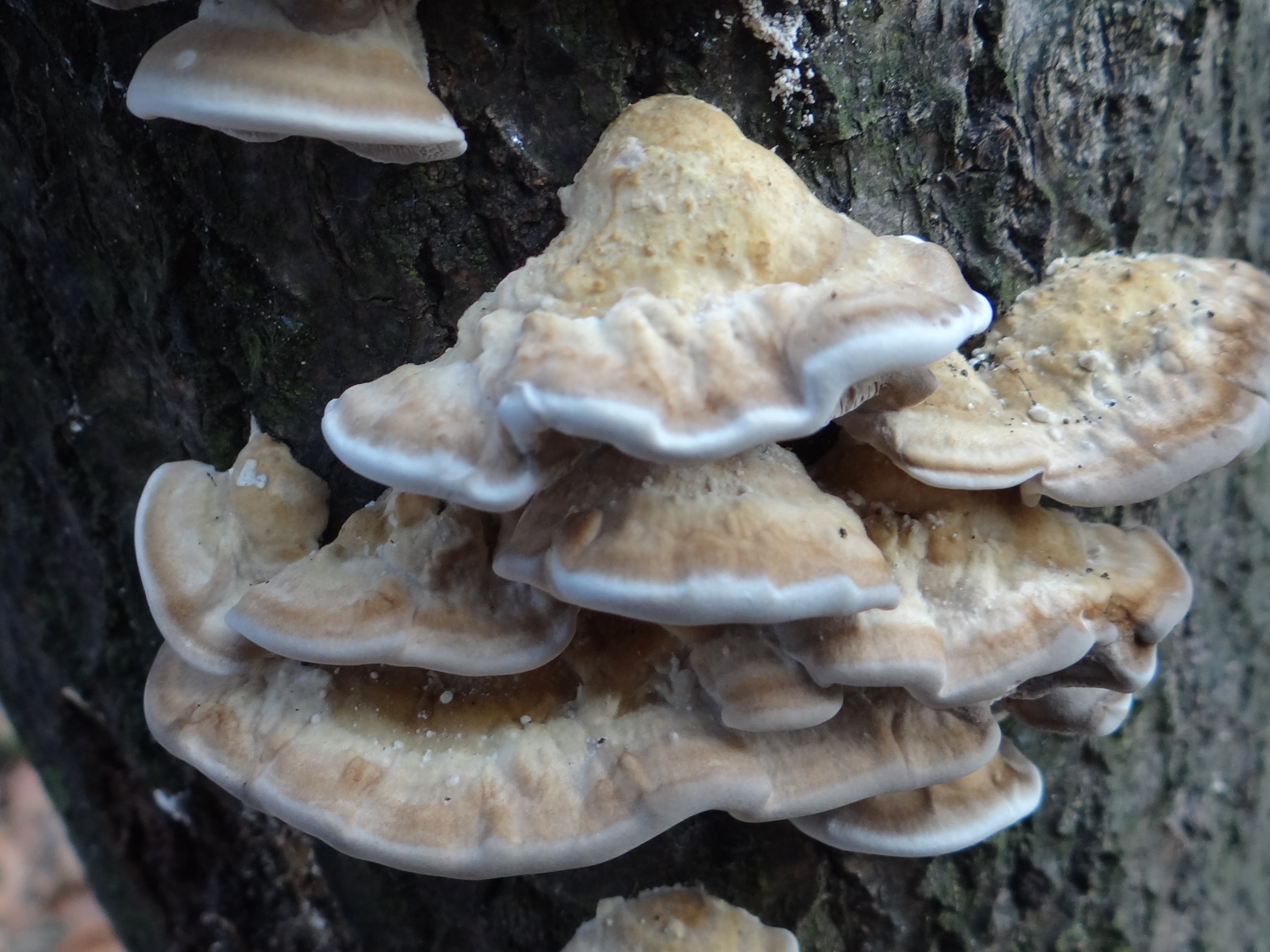
Bjerkandera fumosa

The fruit bodies of Bjerkandera fungi have soft and pliable caps with an upper surface texture ranging from finely hairy to smooth. The pore surface on the undersurface of the cap ranges from grey to black or buff to greyish brown. The tubes are the same colour. A dark, denser zone is typically present between tubes and the context, which is usually white to buff.

The hyphal system in Bjerkandera is monomitic, containing only generative hyphae. These hyphae have clamps, and are thin to thick-walled. Cystidia are absent from the hymenium. The spores of Bjerkandera are smooth with a short cylindrical shape, thin-walled, and do not react in Melzer's reagent.

== Habitat and distribution ==
Bjerkandera fungi usually grow on hardwoods, and are rarely on conifers. They cause a white rot.

== Species ==
As of August 2023, Index Fungorum lists the following species in Bjerkandera:

Image	Scientific name	Taxon author	Year
	Bjerkandera adusta	(Willd.) P. Karst.	1879
	Bjerkandera albocinerea	Motato-Vásq., Robledo & Gugliotta	2020
	Bjerkandera atroalba	(Rick) Westph. & Tomšovský	2015
	Bjerkandera carnegieae	(D.V. Baxter) Robledo, Nakasone & B. Ortiz	2021
	Bjerkandera centroamericana	Kout, Westph. & Tomšovský	2015
	Bjerkandera ecuadorensis	Y.C. Dai, Chao G. Wang & Vlasák	2021
	Bjerkandera fulgida	Y.C. Dai & Chao G. Wang	2021
	Bjerkandera fumosa	(Pers.) P. Karst.	1879
	Bjerkandera mikrofumosa	Ryvarden	2016
	Bjerkandera minispora	Y.C. Dai & Chao G. Wang	2021
	Bjerkandera resupinata	Y.C. Dai & Chao G. Wang	2021
	Bjerkandera subsimulans	Murrill	1907
	Bjerkandera terebrans	(Berk. & M.A. Curtis) Murrill	1907
