= Climacodon sanguineus =

Scientific classification
- Domain: Eukaryota
- Kingdom: Fungi
- Division: Basidiomycota
- Class: Agaricomycetes
- Order: Polyporales
- Family: Phanerochaetaceae
- Genus: Climacodon
- Species: C. sanguineus

Binomial name
- Climacodon sanguineus (Beeli) Maas Geest. (1971)

Synonyms
- Hydnum sanguineum Beeli (1926); Donkia sanguinea (Beeli) Maas Geest. (1967)

Species of fungus

Climacodon sanguineus is a rare species of tooth fungus in the family Phanerochaetaceae that is found in Africa.

== Taxonomy ==
The fungus was originally described as Hydnum sanguineum by Belgian mycologist Maurice Beeli in 1926. The holotype collection was made near Kalo, Democratic Republic of the Congo Rudolph Arnold Maas Geesteranus transferred the species to genus Climacodon in 1971.

Phylogenetic data shows that C. sanguineus forms a well-supported clade with the type species of Climacodon, C. septentrionale, which nests in the Phlebioid clade.

== Description ==
The bright red, funnel-shaped fruit bodies of this fungus are up to 4 cm (1.6 in) tall. They have sharp, cylindrical spines on the underside of the cap. C. sanguineus has a monomitic hyphal system, containing only generative hyphae. These hyphae have a septum; some of the hyphae comprising the cap and in the core of the spines have clamps. The cystidia, which are scattered on the surface on the spines (the spore-bearing surface), are double-walled with a discontinuous internal lumen. The spores are ellipsoid in shape, translucent, and measure 4–5 by 2–2.5 μm.
