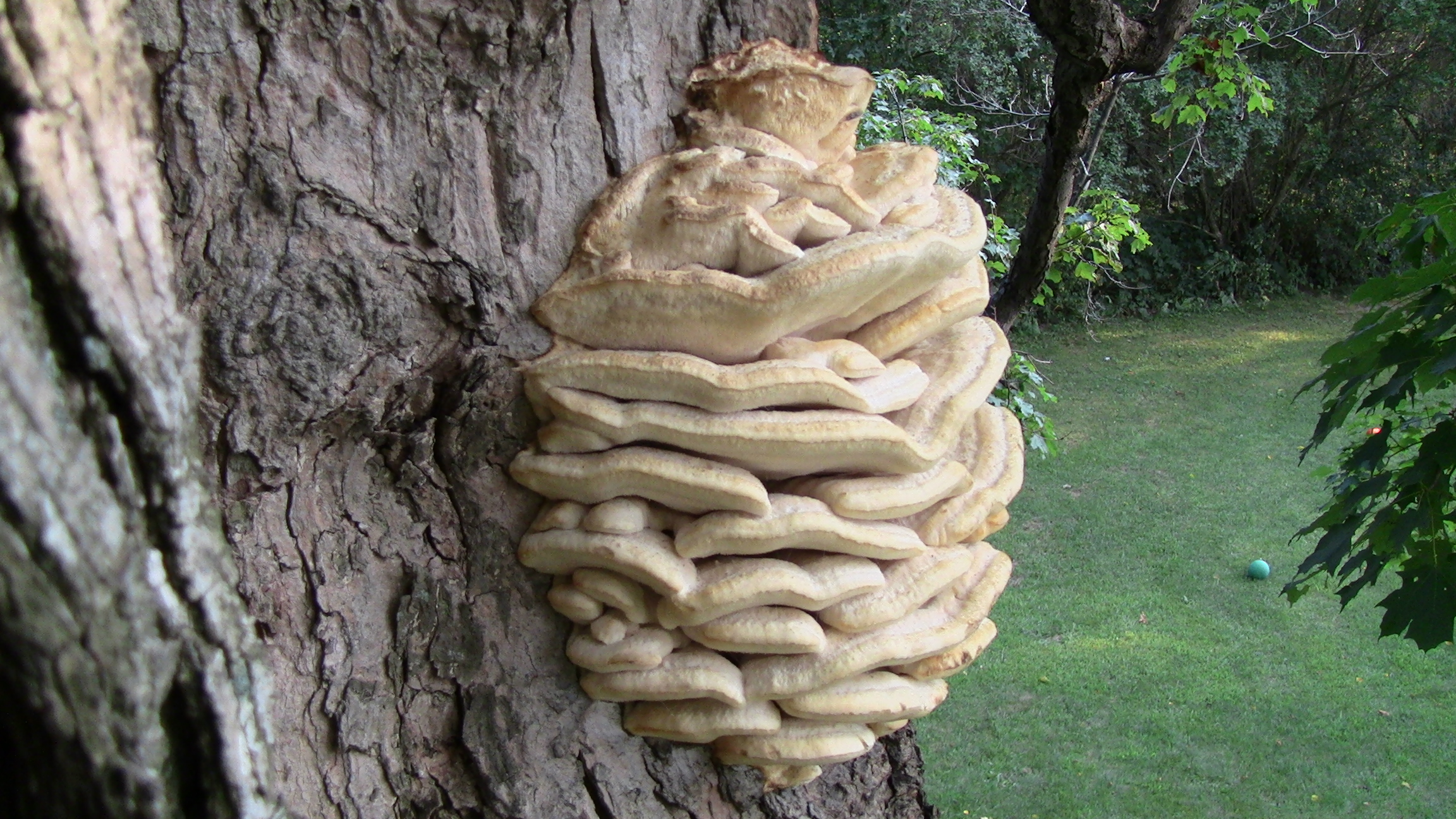

Scientific classification
- Kingdom: Fungi
- Division: Basidiomycota
- Class: Agaricomycetes
- Order: Polyporales
- Family: Phanerochaetaceae
- Genus: Climacodon
- Species: C. septentrionalis

Binomial name
- Climacodon septentrionalis (Fr.) P.Karst. (1881)

Synonyms
- Hydnum septentrionale Fr. (1821); "Hericium septentrionale" (Fr.) Pat. (1900); Steccherinum septentrionale (Fr.) Banker (1906); Creolophus septentrionalis (Fr.) Banker (1912); "Pleurodon septentrionalis" (Fr.) Ricken (1928)

= Climacodon septentrionalis =

Species of fungus

Climacodon septentrionalis, commonly known as the northern tooth fungus or the white rot fungus, is a species of shelf fungus in the phylum Basidiomycota. It is white in color and can be found in large clusters on the trunks of trees. This species is a plant pathogen native to North America.

== Taxonomy ==
Climacodon septentrionalis was originally described by Elias Magnus Fries in 1821 under the genus Hydnum. It was later transferred to Climacodon in 1881 by Petter Karsten.

== Description ==
Individual caps are semicircular or kidney-shaped and can reach up to 30 centimetres (12 in) across and 2.5–5 cm (1–2 in) at the base. They typically occur in large groups that can reach 80 cm (31 1/2 in) in height. Young caps range from mostly white to a yellow-cream color, and slowly become a yellow-brown as they age. The caps tend to persist for multiple weeks, allowing algae to grow, giving them a slightly green appearance. The cap surface can be rough or even hairy, and can have concentric rings radiating out from the base. The underside of the cap has many white spines that reach 1 cm in length and also yellow with age.

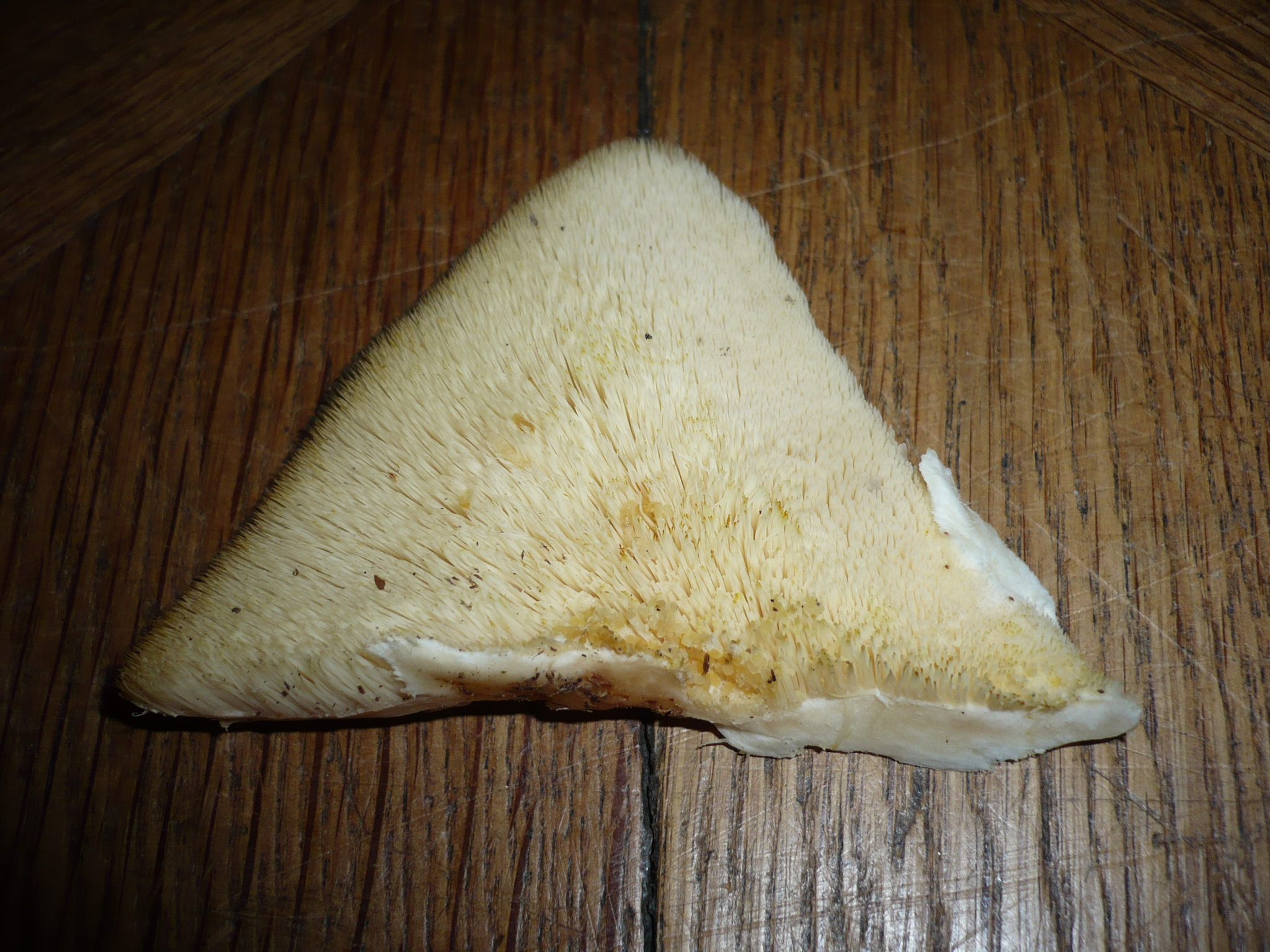
Underside of cap

== Habitat and distribution ==
The species is a common cause of heart rot in hardwood trees in their native range, It can be found on the trunks of living and recently deceased trees, especially beech (Fagus) and maple (Acer) species.

It is native to northeastern North America (August–October), ranging from southern Canada to Kentucky, and as far west as the Great Plains.

== Nematode predation ==
Climacodon septentrionalis was the first observed species of fungus outside of Agaricus to secrete a toxin that it uses to immobilize and kill fungiphagous nematodes. The mycelium of this species grows secretory cells the protrude outwards and develop branches that produce the substance in small droplets. When a nematode comes in contact with a droplet, they become encased in it, and their motion is completely inhibited. Death after contact occurs within several hours, but the rate at which a nematode was decomposed varied greatly, ranging from a few weeks to several days.

== Uses ==
C. septentrionalis is edible but not palatable due to its tough flesh and bitter taste.

=== Novel compounds ===
Climacodon septentrionalis produces some compounds with potential uses. Esters are natural or synthetic, fragrant compounds that can be found in perfumes and flavorings, or used in paints, solvents, insecticides, and more. The mycelium of this species produces esters that could be used in perfumes. The compound furaneol is a commonly used in the cooking industry as a flavoring, with different forms having tastes ranging from a strawberry or pineapple to a caramel or honey flavor. The furaneol found in C. septentrionalis is extracted from its fruiting bodies, and has a strawberry-like flavor and taste.
