= Roseograndinia =

Scientific classification
- Kingdom: Fungi
- Division: Basidiomycota
- Class: Agaricomycetes
- Order: Polyporales
- Family: Phanerochaetaceae
- Genus: Roseograndinia; Hjortstam & Ryvarden (2005)

Type species
- Roseograndinia rosea (Henn.) Hjortstam & Ryvarden (2005)

Synonyms
- Grandinia rosea Henn. (1905); Phlebia rosea (Henn.) Hjortstam & Ryvarden (1980); Phanerochaete rosea (Henn.) P.K.Buchanan & Hood (1992); Efibula rosea (Henn.) Kotir. & Saaren. (1993)

Genus of fungi

Roseograndinia is a fungal genus in the family Phanerochaetaceae. It is a monotypic genus, containing the single crust fungus species Roseograndinia rosea, recorded from tropical east Africa and from New Zealand.

== Taxonomy ==
Paul Christoph Hennings originally described Grandinia rosea in 1905, from collections made in Usambara, a mountain range in northeastern Tanzania. The fungus was subsequently transferred to the genera Phlebia, Phanerochaete, and Efibula. In 2005 Kurt Hjortstam and Leif Ryvarden circumscribed the genus Roseograndinia to contain it.

== Description ==
Roseograndinia rosea has a rosy to reddish surface with a grandinoid (as if covered with small granules) to odonotoid (as if covered with small teeth) texture. Microscopic characteristics include the lack of clamp connections in the hyphae, and the absence of cystidia. Its spores are thin-walled, roughly spherical to elliptical, and inamyloid, measuring about 4–5 by 3 μm. The basidia (spore-bearing cells) are narrowly club shaped to tubular, and measure 25–30 by 5 μm. Roseograndinia has a monomitic hyphal system, containing only generative hyphae.

== Habitat and distribution ==
Roseograndinia rosea is a white rot fungus that grows on the bark on woody substrates. It was reported from New Zealand in 1992, where it was found growing on the endemic species New Zealand laurel (Corynocarpus laevigatus), as well as Australian blackwood (Acacia melanoxylon), a tree introduced from Australia.
