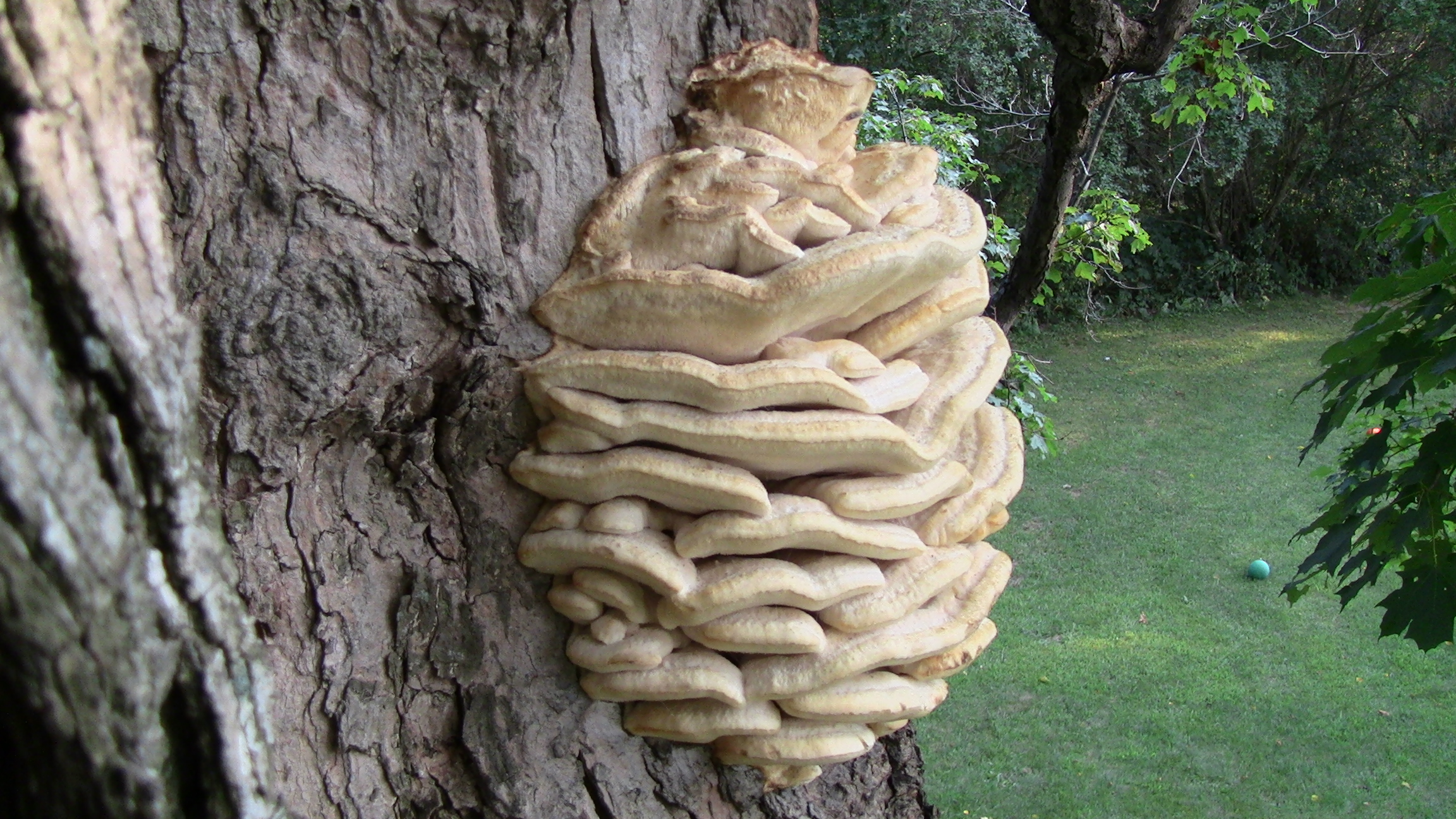
- Climacodon septentrionalis

Scientific classification
- Domain: Eukaryota
- Kingdom: Fungi
- Division: Basidiomycota
- Class: Agaricomycetes
- Order: Polyporales
- Family: Phanerochaetaceae
- Genus: Climacodon; P.Karst. (1881)

Type species
- Climacodon septentrionalis (Fr.) P.Karst. (1881)

Species
- C. annamensis C. chlamydocystis C. dubitativus C. pulcherrimus C. roseomaculatus C. sanguineus C. septentrionalis

= Climacodon =

Genus of fungi

Climacodon is a widespread genus of tooth fungi in the family Phanerochaetaceae.

== Taxonomy ==
The genus was circumscribed by Finnish mycologist Petter Karsten in 1881 with Climacodon septentrionalis as the type species. This fungus was originally described by Elias Magnus Fries in 1821 as Hydnum septentrionale.

Climacodon has been placed variously in the family Meruliaceae, or in the Phanerochaetaceae. Molecular analysis places Climacodon as a member of the Phlebioid clade.

== Species ==
- Climacodon annamensis (Har. & Pat.) Maas Geest. (1974)
- Climacodon chlamydocystis Maas Geest. (1971)
- Climacodon dubitativus (Lloyd) Ryvarden (1992) – Philippines
- Climacodon pulcherrimus (Berk. & M.A.Curtis) Nikol. (1961)
- Climacodon roseomaculatus (Henn. & E.Nyman) Jülich (1982)
- Climacodon sanguineus (Beeli) Maas Geest. (1971)
- Climacodon septentrionalis (Fr.) P.Karst. (1881)
