= Rhizochaete radicata =

Scientific classification
- Kingdom: Fungi
- Division: Basidiomycota
- Class: Agaricomycetes
- Order: Polyporales
- Family: Phanerochaetaceae
- Genus: Rhizochaete
- Species: R. radicata

Binomial name
- Rhizochaete radicata (Henn.) Gresl., Nakasone & Rajchenb. (2004)

Synonyms
- Corticium radicatum Henn., (1895); Peniophora radicata (Henn.) Höhn. & Litsch., (1907); Phanerochaete filamentosa sensu auct. eur.; (2005); Phanerochaete radicata (Henn.) Nakasone, C.R. Bergman & Burds. (1994)

Species of fungus

Rhizochaete is a plant pathogen infecting planes, beeches, pines, oaks and other trees.

It was first described as Corticium radicatum in 1895 by Paul Christoph Hennings. It was transferred to the genus, Rhizochaete by Alina Greslebin, Karen Nakasone and Mario Rajchenberg in 2004. Index Fungorum and Mycobank disagree on the current name of this taxon, with Mycobank asserting it to be Phanerochaete radicata and Index Fungorum, Rhizochaete radicata.
