= Ceriporiopsis kunmingensis =

Scientific classification
- Domain: Eukaryota
- Kingdom: Fungi
- Division: Basidiomycota
- Class: Agaricomycetes
- Order: Polyporales
- Family: Phanerochaetaceae
- Genus: Ceriporiopsis
- Species: C. kunmingensis

Binomial name
- Ceriporiopsis kunmingensis C.L.Zhao (2016)

Species of fungus

Ceriporiopsis kunmingensis is a species of poroid crust fungus in the family Phanerochaetaceae. It was described as a new species by mycologist Chang-Lin Zhao in 2016. The type specimen was collected in Yunnan, China, where it was found fruiting on a fallen angiosperm trunk. The colour of the fruit body is pale cinnamon-buff, becoming yellowish when dry. Spores of C. kunmingensis are sausage shaped (allantoid) and measure 4.5–5 by 1.5–2 μm. The fungus is closely related to Phlebia aurea, and groups phylogenetically with P. livida and P. subserialis.|
