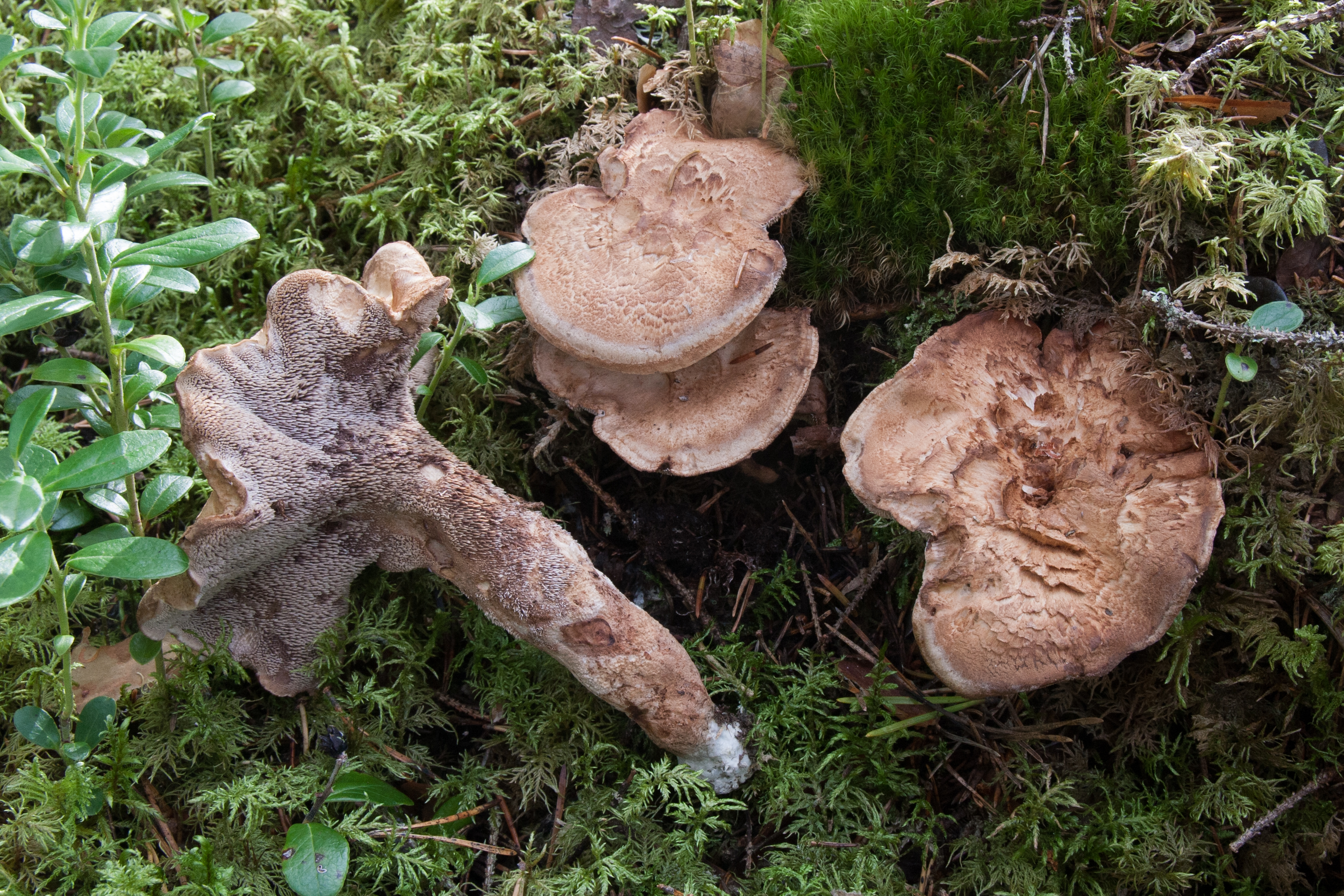

Scientific classification
- Kingdom: Fungi
- Division: Basidiomycota
- Class: Agaricomycetes
- Order: Thelephorales
- Family: Bankeraceae
- Genus: Hydnellum
- Species: H. fennicum

Binomial name
- Hydnellum fennicum (P.Karst.) E.Larss., K.H.Larss. & Kõljalg

Synonyms
- Sarcodon scabrosus var. fennicus P.Karst. (1882); Hydnum fennicum (P.Karst.) Sacc. (1888); Phaeodon fennicus (P.Karst.) Henn. (1898); Hydnellum fennicus (P.Karst.) P.Karst. (1887)

= Hydnellum fennicum =

Species of mushroom-forming fungus

Hydnellum fennicum is a species of tooth fungus in the family Bankeraceae. Native to northern Europe, it forms mycorrhizal associations with pine trees. It is recognised by its yellowish‑brown cap covered in fine powdery scales and by downward‑pointing teeth beneath that change from whitish to purplish‑brown. The fungus is considered critically endangered in Switzerland due to habitat loss.

== Taxonomy ==
It was originally described by the Norwegian mycologist Petter Karsten in 1882 as a variety of Sarcodon scabrosus. Karsten promoted it to a distinct species in 1887.

== Description ==
Hydnellum fennicum produces fruit bodies (basidiocarps) that occur singly or in small clusters. The cap (pileus) grows up to 10 cm in diameter and often develops a shallow central depression. Its surface is densely covered in fine, powdery scales—those in the centre tending to stand upright, while those towards the margin lie flat. Young caps are ochre‑yellow, but they darken to yellow‑brown over time and may show patches of reddish‑brown. Beneath the cap, the hymenophore is composed of slender, downward‑pointing spines (or "teeth") up to 5 mm long; these start off whitish and gradually deepen to purplish‑brown. The flesh (context) is white throughout but shows greenish to greyish tones at the base of the stem (stipe), and emits a faint bitter‑almond smell when fresh.

The stipe is cylindrical, measuring 3–7 cm tall by 1–3 cm thick. It is initially tomentose—that is, clothed in a soft, woolly mat of hairs—but becomes smooth (glabrous) with age. Its colour matches the cap except at the very base, which often turns bluish‑green to greyish‑green and may be overlaid by pale mycelium (the fungal network). Under the microscope, the cap tissue comprises simple septate hyphae—thread‑like cells divided by cross‑walls—up to 20 μm wide. The spores formed on the spines (basidiospores) are pale brown, sharply angular in outline, and measure roughly 6.3–7.6 by 4.5–5.2 μm.

== Habitat and distribution ==
Hydnellum fennicum is distributed primarily in continental Norway and eastwards. It forms ectomycorrhizae with pine. It is considered critically endangered in Switzerland.
