= Hjortstamia =

Scientific classification
- Kingdom: Fungi
- Division: Basidiomycota
- Class: Agaricomycetes
- Order: Polyporales
- Family: Phanerochaetaceae
- Genus: Hjortstamia; Boidin & Gilles (2003)

Type species
- Hjortstamia castanea Boidin & Gilles (2003)

Genus of fungi

Hjortstamia is a genus of corticioid fungi in the family Phanerochaetaceae. It was circumscribed by French mycologists Jacques Boidin and Gérard Gilles in 2003.

The genus name of Hjortstamia is in honour of Kurt Hjortstam (1933 - 2009), who was a Swedish mycologist from the University of Gothenburg.

Miettinen and colleagues consider Hjortstamia to be a synonym of Phlebiopsis based on molecular phylogenetics.

== Species ==
- Hjortstamia bambusicola (Berk. & Broome) Hjortstam & Ryvarden (2005)
- Hjortstamia brunneocystidiata (Sheng H.Wu) Sheng H.Wu & Hallenb. (2010)
- Hjortstamia castanea Boidin & Gilles (2003)
- Hjortstamia friesii (Lév.) Boidin & Gilles (2003)
- Hjortstamia fuscomarginata (Burt) Hjortstam & Ryvarden (2008)
- Hjortstamia laxa (Sheng H.Wu) Sheng H.Wu & Hallenb. (2010)
- Hjortstamia medica (Curr.) Hjortstam & Ryvarden (2005)
- Hjortstamia mexicana (A.L.Welden) Boidin & Gilles (2003)
- Hjortstamia monomitica (G.Cunn.) Hjortstam & Ryvarden (2005)
- Hjortstamia novae-granata (A.L.Welden) Hjortstam & Ryvarden (2008)
- Hjortstamia percomis (Berk. & Broome) Boidin & Gilles (2003)
- Hjortstamia perplexa (D.A.Reid) Boidin & Gilles (2003)
- Hjortstamia rimosissima (Berk. & M.A.Curtis) Boidin & Gilles (2003)
