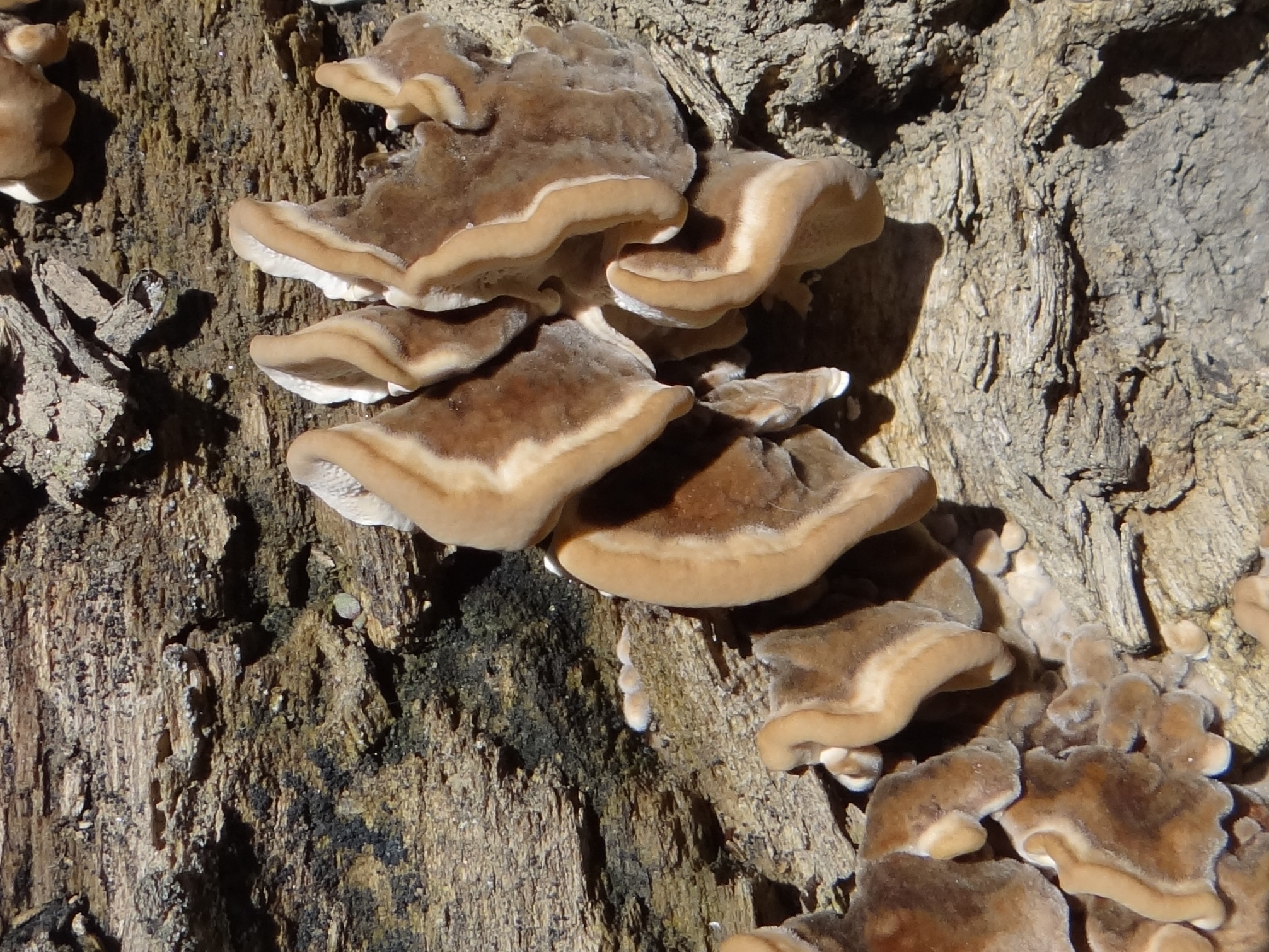

Scientific classification
- Domain: Eukaryota
- Kingdom: Fungi
- Division: Basidiomycota
- Class: Agaricomycetes
- Order: Polyporales
- Family: Phanerochaetaceae
- Genus: Bjerkandera
- Species: B. fumosa

Binomial name
- Bjerkandera fumosa (Pers.) P.Karst. (1879)

Synonyms
- Boletus fumosus Pers. (1801)

= Bjerkandera fumosa =

Species of fungus

Bjerkandera fumosa, the big smoky bracket, is a species of poroid fungus in the family Phanerochaetaceae.

== Taxonomy ==
It was first described to science as Boletus fumosus by Christiaan Hendrik Persoon in 1801. Petter Adolf Karsten transferred the species to the genus Bjerkandera in 1879.

== Description ==
The form of Bjerkandera fumosa fruit bodies ranges from effused-reflexed (spread out over the substrate and turned back at the margin to form a cap) or cap-like, but attached directly to the substrate without a stipe. These caps can be solitary or closely overlapping, and are often fused with neighbouring caps. The caps typically measure 5–10 cm (2.0–3.9 in) wide by 2 cm (0.8 in) wide, and a buff-coloured upper surface with a texture ranging from finely hairy (tomentose) to smooth. The pores on the cap underside are circular to angular, numbering 2–5 per millimetre.

Bjerkandera fumosa has a monomitic hyphal system, containing only generative hyphae. The basidia are club-shaped, measuring 20–22 μm. Spores have the shape of short cylinders, and measure 5.5–7 by 2.5–3.5 μm. They are smooth, hyaline, and do not react with Melzer's reagent.

== Habitat and distribution ==
Bjerkandera fumosa causes a white rot in various hardwood species. It has a circumboreal distribution in the Northern Hemisphere.
