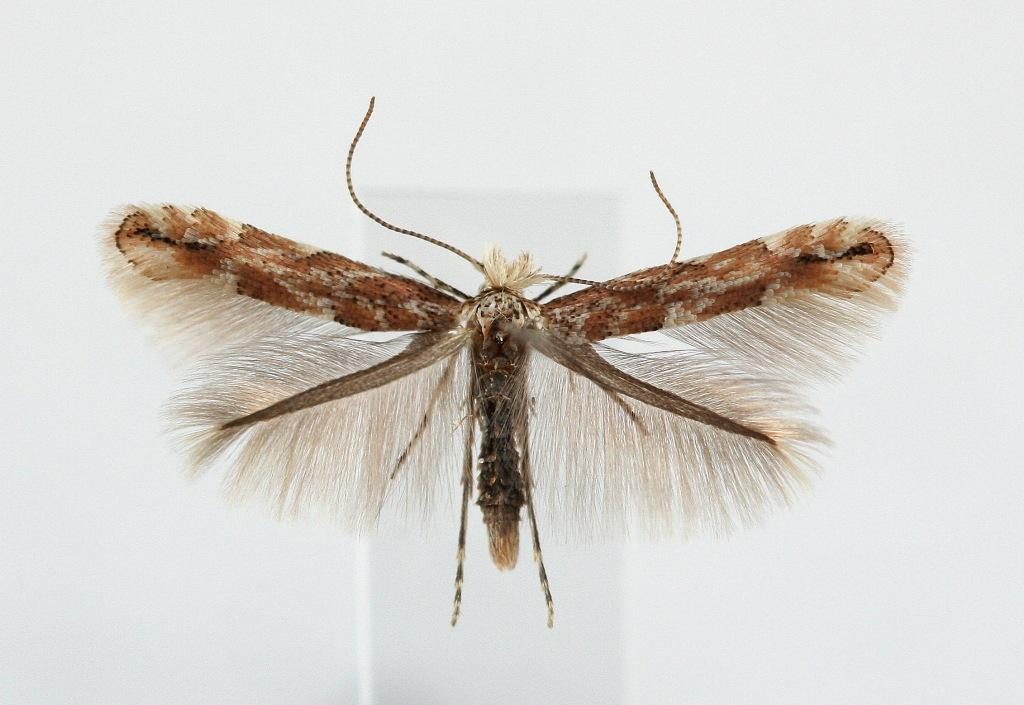

Scientific classification
- Kingdom: Animalia
- Phylum: Arthropoda
- Clade: Pancrustacea
- Class: Insecta
- Order: Lepidoptera
- Family: Gracillariidae
- Genus: Phyllonorycter
- Species: P. sagitella

Binomial name
- Phyllonorycter sagitella (Bjerkander, 1790)

Synonyms
- Phalaena sagitella Bjerkander, 1790; Lithocolletis tremulae Zeller, 1846

= Phyllonorycter sagitella =

Species of moth

Phyllonorycter sagitella is a moth of the family Gracillariidae. It is found from Fennoscandia and northern Russia to the Pyrenees, Italy and Romania and from Great Britain to southern Russia.

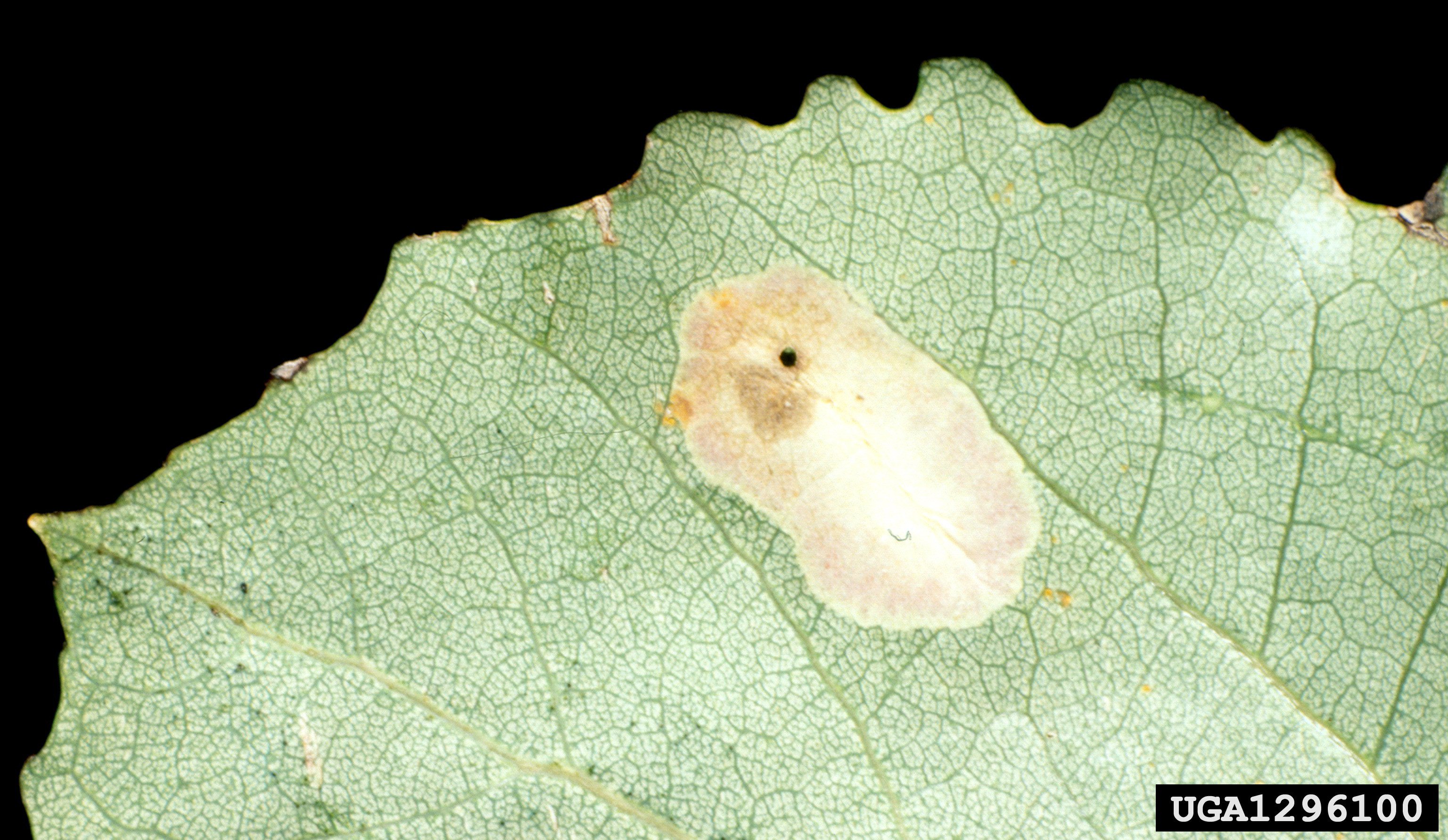
Damage

The wingspan is 8.5-9.5 mm. There are two generations per year, with larvae in June and again from August to October, and adults on wing in May and again in July and August.

The larvae feed on Populus tremula. They mine the leaves of their host plant. The pupa is made in a very flimsy cocoon.
