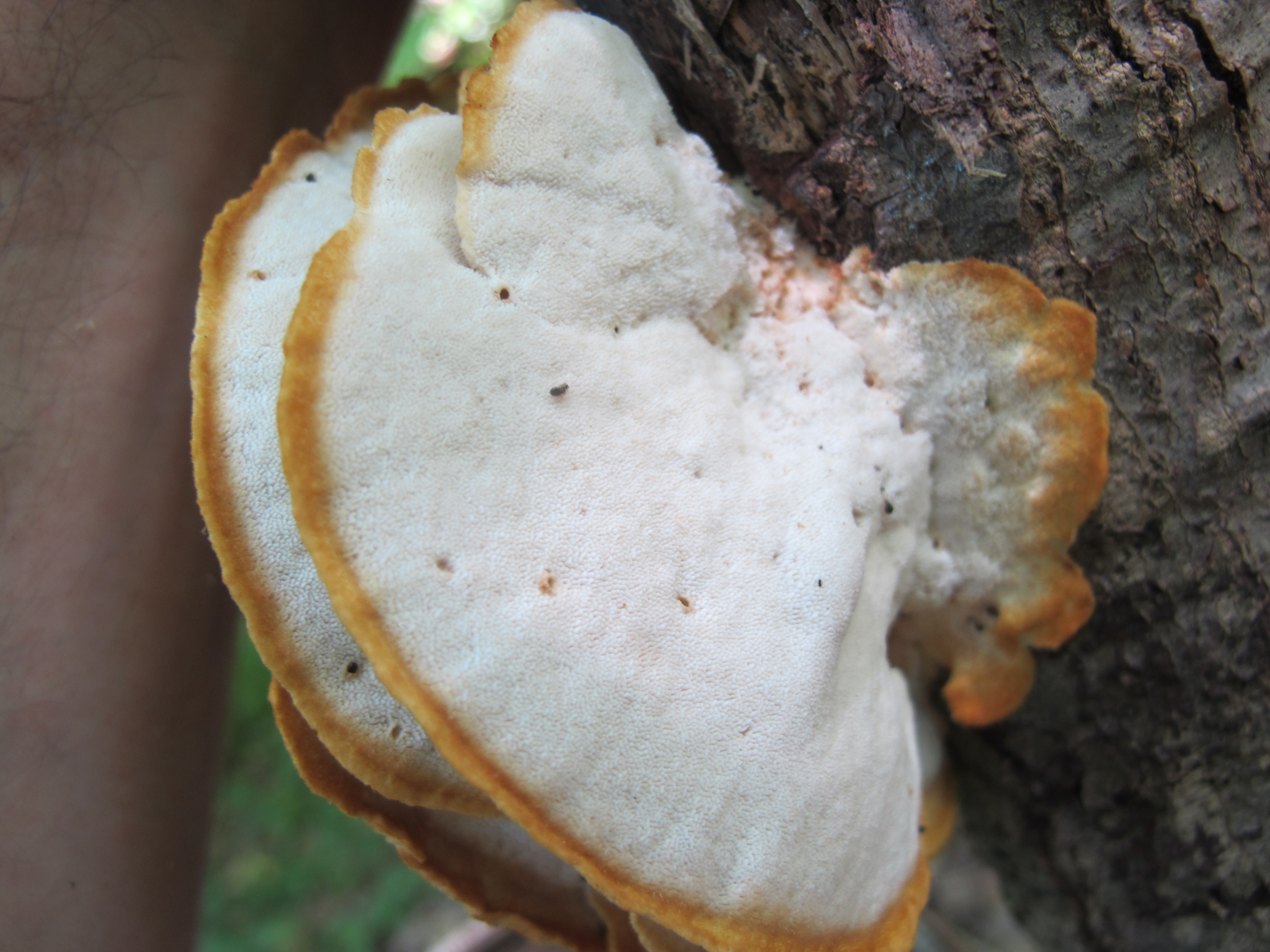

Scientific classification
- Domain: Eukaryota
- Kingdom: Fungi
- Division: Basidiomycota
- Class: Agaricomycetes
- Order: Polyporales
- Family: Phanerochaetaceae
- Genus: Climacodon
- Species: C. pulcherrimus

Binomial name
- Climacodon pulcherrimus (Berk. & M.A.Curtis) Nikol. (1961)

Synonyms
- Hydnum pulcherrimum Berk. & M.A.Curtis (1849); Hydnum gilvum Berk. (1851); Hydnum uleanum Henn. (1897); Steccherinum pulcherrimum (Berk. & M.A.Curtis) Banker (1906); Hydnum kauffmani Peck (1907); Creolophus pulcherrimus (Berk. & M.A.Curtis) Banker (1913); Hydnum australe Lloyd (1919); Dryodon pulcherrimum (Berk. & M.A.Curtis) Pilát (1934); Donkia pulcherrima (Berk. & M.A.Curtis) Pilát (1937)

= Climacodon pulcherrimus =

Species of fungus

Climacodon pulcherrimus is a white rot–causing species of tooth fungus in the family Phanerochaetaceae.

The species was first described as a species of Hydnum by Miles Berkeley and Moses Ashley Curtis in 1849. T. L. Nikolajeva transferred it to its current genus, Climacodon, in 1962, but research published in 2007 suggests it should be placed in a different genus.

It is widely distributed in subtropical and tropical areas, where it grows on decomposing hardwoods, causing a white rot.
