= Albotricha =

Scientific classification
- Kingdom: Fungi
- Division: Ascomycota
- Class: Leotiomycetes
- Order: Helotiales
- Family: Lachnaceae
- Genus: Albotricha; Raitv.

Type species
- Albotricha acutipila (P. Karst.) Raitv.

Genus of fungi

Albotricha is a genus of fungi within the family Lachnaceae. The genus contains 19 species.
