= Australicium =

Scientific classification
- Kingdom: Fungi
- Division: Basidiomycota
- Class: Agaricomycetes
- Order: Polyporales
- Family: Phanerochaetaceae
- Genus: Australicium; Hjortstam & Ryvarden (2002)

Type species
- Australicium singulare (G.Cunn.) Hjortstam & Ryvarden (2002)

Species
- A. cylindrosporum A. singulare

Genus of fungi

Australicium is a genus of corticioid fungi in the family Phanerochaetaceae. The genus was circumscribed by mycologists Kurt Hjortstam and Leif Ryvarden in 2002 to contain the type species, A. singulare, which is found in New Zealand. The Venezuelan species A. cylindrosporum was added to the genus in 2005.
