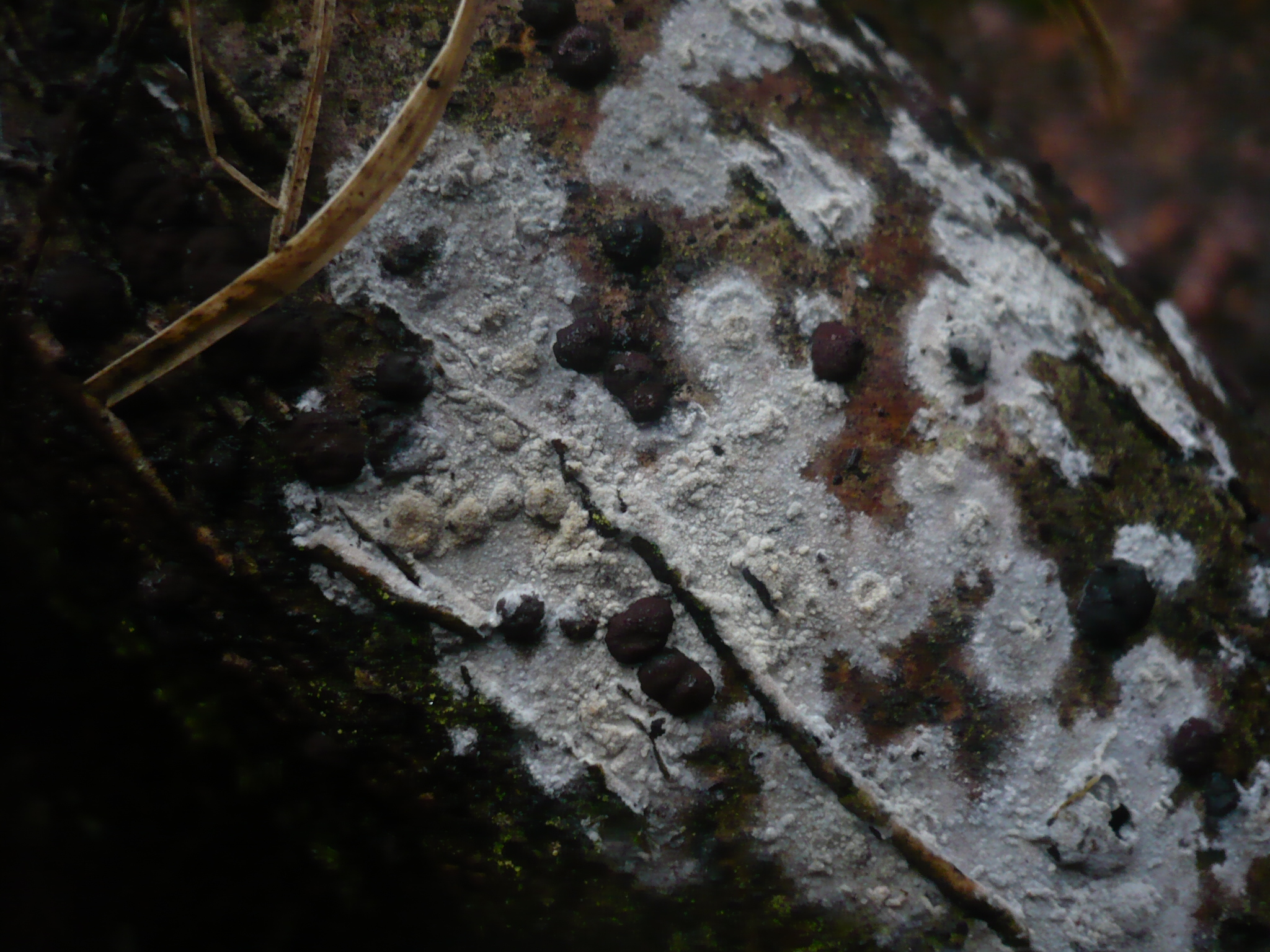

Scientific classification
- Domain: Eukaryota
- Kingdom: Fungi
- Division: Basidiomycota
- Class: Agaricomycetes
- Order: Polyporales
- Family: Phanerochaetaceae
- Genus: Hyphodermella
- Species: H. corrugata

Binomial name
- Hyphodermella corrugata (Fr.) J.Erikss. & Ryvarden (1976)

Synonyms
- Grandinia corrugata Fr. (1874); Hydnochaete laeta Rick (1959); Metulodontia junquillea (Quél.) Parmasto (1968); Odontia coloradensis Overh. (1930); Odontia corrugata (Fr.) Bres. (1897); Odontia fibrosissima Rick (1959); Odontia horridissima Rick (1959); Odontia junquillea Quél. (1878); Odontia livida Bres. (1891); Odontia subferruginea Rick (1933); Odontina junquillea (Quél.) Pat. (1887); Protodontia livida (Bres.) Park.-Rhodes (1956)

= Hyphodermella corrugata =

Species of fungus

Hyphodermella corrugata is a species of crust fungus in the family Phanerochaetaceae, and the type species of genus Hyphodermella.
