= Ceriporiopsis pseudoplacenta =

Scientific classification
- Kingdom: Fungi
- Division: Basidiomycota
- Class: Agaricomycetes
- Order: Polyporales
- Family: Phanerochaetaceae
- Genus: Ceriporiopsis
- Species: C. pseudoplacenta

Binomial name
- Ceriporiopsis pseudoplacenta Vlasák & Ryvarden (2012)

Species of fungus

Ceriporiopsis pseudoplacenta is a species of poroid crust fungus in the family Phanerochaetaceae. It was described as a new species by mycologists Josef Vlasák and Leif Ryvarden in 2012. The type specimen was collected in Bogachiel State Park, Washington, where it was found growing on a coniferous log. It is named for its superficial similarity to Postia placenta.
