= Australohydnum =

Scientific classification
- Kingdom: Fungi
- Division: Basidiomycota
- Class: Agaricomycetes
- Order: Polyporales
- Family: Phanerochaetaceae
- Genus: Australohydnum; Jülich (1978)

Type species
- Australohydnum griseofuscescens (Reichardt) Jülich (1978)

Species
- A. castaneum A. dregeanum

Genus of fungi

Australohydnum is a genus of resupinate fungi in the family Phanerochaetaceae. The genus was circumscribed in 1978 by Swiss mycologist Walter Jülich with the Australian fungus Australohydnum griseofuscescens (formerly Hydnum griseo-fuscescens Reichardt) as the type species. A. dregeanum and A. castaneum were added to the genus in 1990 and 2006, respectively. Australohydnum griseofuscescens is now considered to be synonymous with Irpex vellereus.
