= Phanerodontia =

Scientific classification
- Kingdom: Fungi
- Division: Basidiomycota
- Class: Agaricomycetes
- Order: Polyporales
- Family: Phanerochaetaceae
- Genus: Phanerodontia; Hjortstam & Ryvarden (2010)

Type species
- Phanerodontia dentata Hjortstam & Ryvarden (2010)

Species
- P. chrysosporium P. dentata P. irpicoides P. magnoliae

Genus of fungi

Phanerodontia is a genus of four species of crust fungi in the family Phanerochaetaceae. The genus was circumscribed by mycologists Kurt Hjortstam and Leif Ryvarden in 2010 with Phanerodontia dentata as the type species.

== Species ==
- Phanerodontia chrysosporium (Burds.) Hjortstam & Ryvarden (2010)
- Phanerodontia dentata Hjortstam & Ryvarden (2010)
- Phanerodontia irpicoides (Hjortstam) Hjortstam & Ryvarden (2010)
- Phanerodontia magnoliae (Berk. & M.A.Curtis) Hjortstam & Ryvarden (2010)
