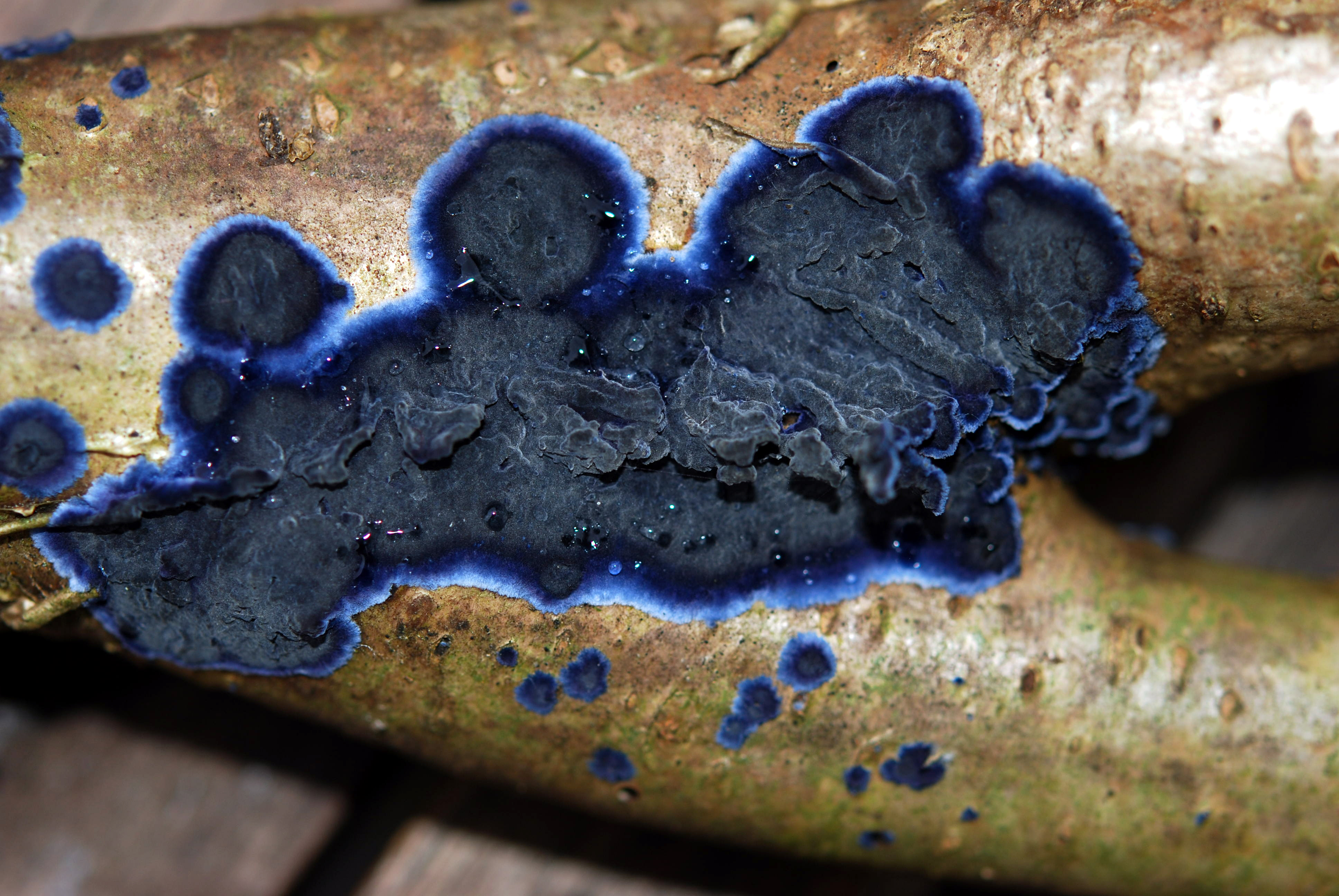
- Terana coerulea

Scientific classification
- Kingdom: Fungi
- Division: Basidiomycota
- Class: Agaricomycetes
- Order: Polyporales
- Family: Phanerochaetaceae
- Genus: Terana; Adans. (1763)

Type species
- Terana coerulea (Lam.) Kuntze (1891)

Synonyms
- Pulcherricium Parmasto (1968)

= Terana =

Genus of fungi

Terana is a fungal genus in the family Phanerochaetaceae. It is a monotypic genus, containing the single species Terana caerulea, a widespread crust fungus.
