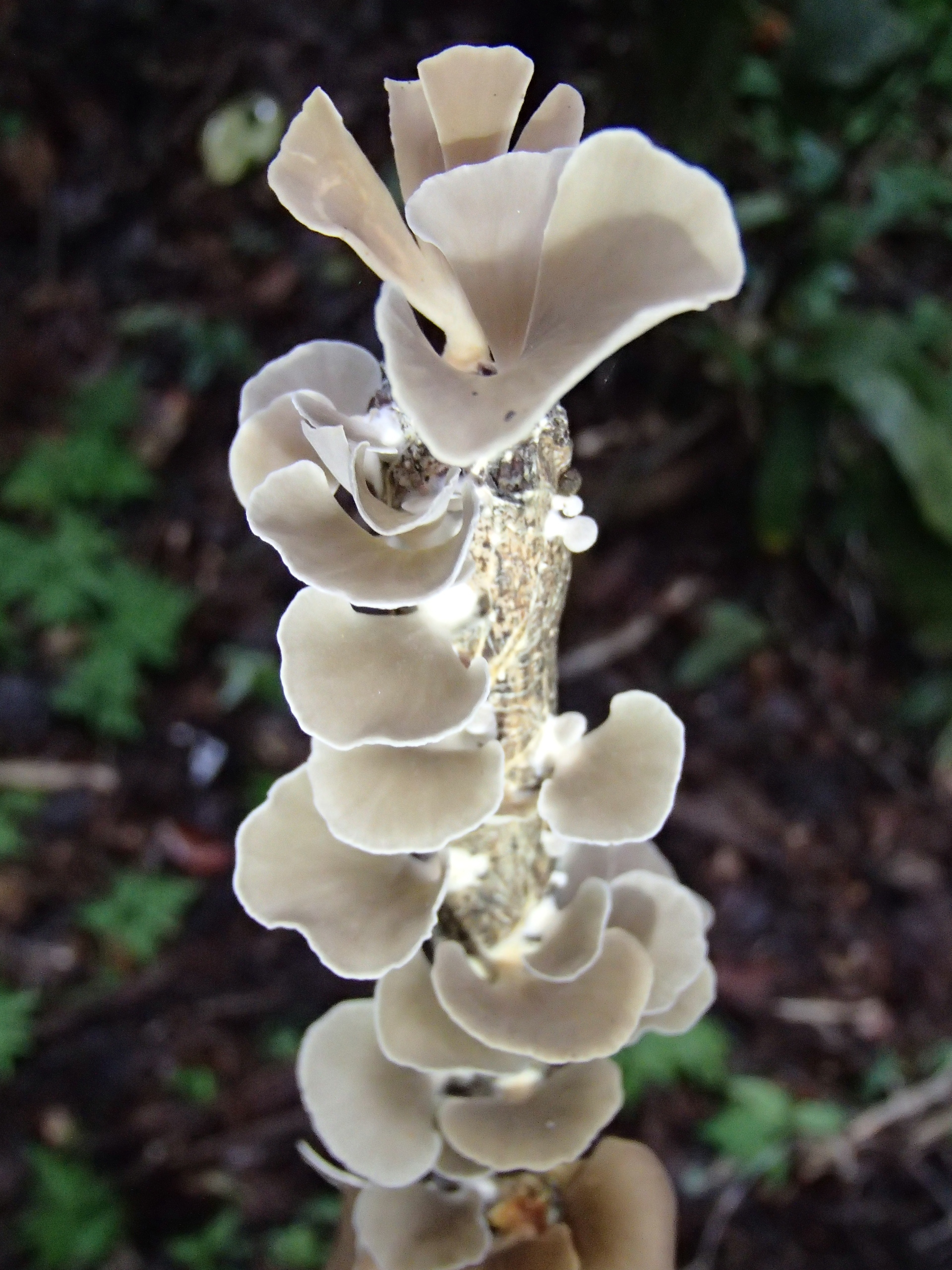
- Inflatostereum glabrum

Scientific classification
- Kingdom: Fungi
- Division: Basidiomycota
- Class: Agaricomycetes
- Order: Polyporales
- Family: Phanerochaetaceae
- Genus: Inflatostereum; D.A.Reid (1965)

Type species
- Inflatostereum glabrum (Lév.) D.A.Reid (1965)

Species
- I. glabrum I. radicatum

= Inflatostereum =

Genus of fungi

Inflatostereum is a genus of two species of polypore fungi in the family Phanerochaetaceae. The genus was circumscribed by English mycologist Derek Reid in 1965.
