= Rhizochaete =

Scientific classification
- Kingdom: Fungi
- Division: Basidiomycota
- Class: Agaricomycetes
- Order: Polyporales
- Family: Phanerochaetaceae
- Genus: Rhizochaete; Gresl., Nakasone & Rajchenb. (2004)

Type species
- Rhizochaete brunnea Gresl., Nakasone & Rajchenb. (2004)

Species
- R. americana R. borneensis R. brunnea R. filamentosa R. fouquieriae R. radicata R. sulphurosa R. sulphurina R. violascens

Genus of fungi

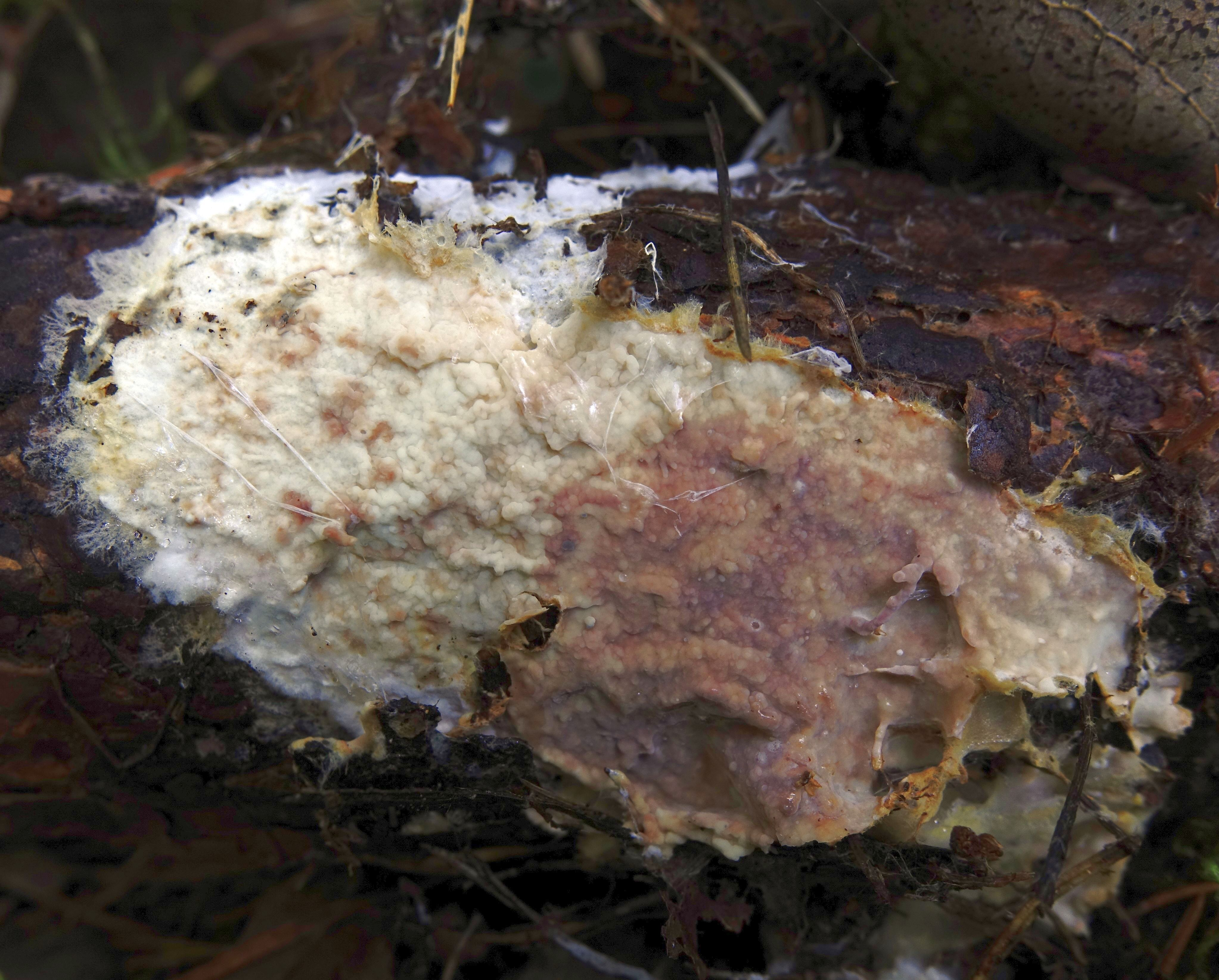
Rhizochaete violascens

Rhizochaete is a genus of nine species of poroid crust fungi in the family Phanerochaetaceae. The genus is closely related to Phanerochaete. Aside from the widespread Rhizochaete radicata and the Asian species R. borneensis, most species of Rhizochaete fungi are found in North and South America.

== Taxonomy ==
The genus Rhizochaete was circumscribed by mycologists Alina Greslebin, Karen Nakasone, and Mario Rajchenberg in 2004. In addition to the newly described type species, Rhizochaete brunnea, five fungi previously placed in the genera Ceraceomyces and Phanerochaete were included in Rhizochaete. Three additional species were added by Brazilian researchers in 2016. Rhizochaete is closely related to Phanerochaete, in terms of both morphological characteristics and phylogenetic similarity.

The genus name is a combination of Greek rhiza, meaning root, referring to the rhizomorphs, and chaite, meaning hair, setae, spine, or bristle, referring to the protruding cystidia.

== Description ==
Rhizochaete fruit bodies have a hymenophore surface texture that ranges from smooth to tuberculate (with knots or rounded bumps). When moist, the hymenophore is membranaceous (membrane-like) to pellicular (forming a peel or thin crust). When dry, the hymenophore becomes leathery or papery, and may often be readily peeled from its substrate. The outer margin of the fruit body is fimbriate (fringed with hairs or fibres) or fibrillose (appearing as if made of fine, silky threads). Rhizomorphs are abundant in the margins and around the hymenophore. Both the fruit body surface and the rhizomorphs turn red to violet when treated with a drop of dilute solution of potassium hydroxide.

Rhizochaete has a monomitic hyphal system, with only generative hyphae. The hymenium contains cystidia, that are encrusted with yellowish brown granules. The spores are cylindrical to roughly spherical, measuring up to 7 μm.

== Species ==
- Rhizochaete americana (Nakasone, C.R. Bergman & Burds.) Gresl., Nakasone & Rajchenb. (2004) – eastern North America
- Rhizochaete belizensis Nakasone, K.Draeger & B.Ortiz (2017)
- Rhizochaete borneensis (Jülich) Gresl., Nakasone & Rajchenb. (2004) – Borneo; Brunei; Taiwan
- Rhizochaete brunnea Gresl., Nakasone & Rajchenb. (2004) – Argentina
- Rhizochaete filamentosa (Berk. & M.A.Curtis) Gresl., Nakasone & Rajchenb. (2004) – eastern North America and Australia
- Rhizochaete flava (Burt) Nakasone, K.Draeger & B.Ortiz (2017)
- Rhizochaete fouquieriae (Nakasone & Gilb.) Gresl., Nakasone & Rajchenb. (2004) – southwestern United States
- Rhizochaete radicata (Henn.) Gresl., Nakasone & Rajchenb. (2004) – widespread
- Rhizochaete rhizomorphosulphurea (B.K.Bakshi & Suj.Singh) Nakasone (2017) – India
- Rhizochaete sulphurosa (Bres.) Chikowski, K.H.Larss. & Gibertoni (2016) – Brazil
- Rhizochaete sulphurina (P.Karst.) K.H.Larss. (2016) – Brazil
- Rhizochaete violascens (Fr.) K.H.Larss. (2016) – Brazil
