= Karsteniomyces =

Scientific classification
- Kingdom: Fungi
- Division: Ascomycota
- Class: incertae sedis
- Order: incertae sedis
- Family: incertae sedis
- Genus: Karsteniomyces; D.Hawksw. (1980)

Species
- K. llimonae K. peltigerae K. tuberculosus

Genus of fungi

Karsteniomyces is a genus of lichenicolous fungi of unknown familial, ordinal, and class placement in the Ascomycota. The genus was circumscribed by David Leslie Hawksworth in 1980. The species of this genus are found in Europe.

The genus name of Karsteniomyces is in honour of Petter Adolf Karsten (1834–1917), who was a Finnish born mycologist.

The genus was circumscribed by David Leslie Hawksworth in Bull. Brit. Mus. (Nat. Hist.) vol.9 (Issue 1) on page 22 in 1981.

Species known;.

- Karsteniomyces llimonae Boqueras & Diederich (1993)
- Karsteniomyces peltigerae (P.Karst.) D.Hawksw. (1980)
- Karsteniomyces tuberculosus Alstrup & D.Hawksw. (1990) – Greenland
