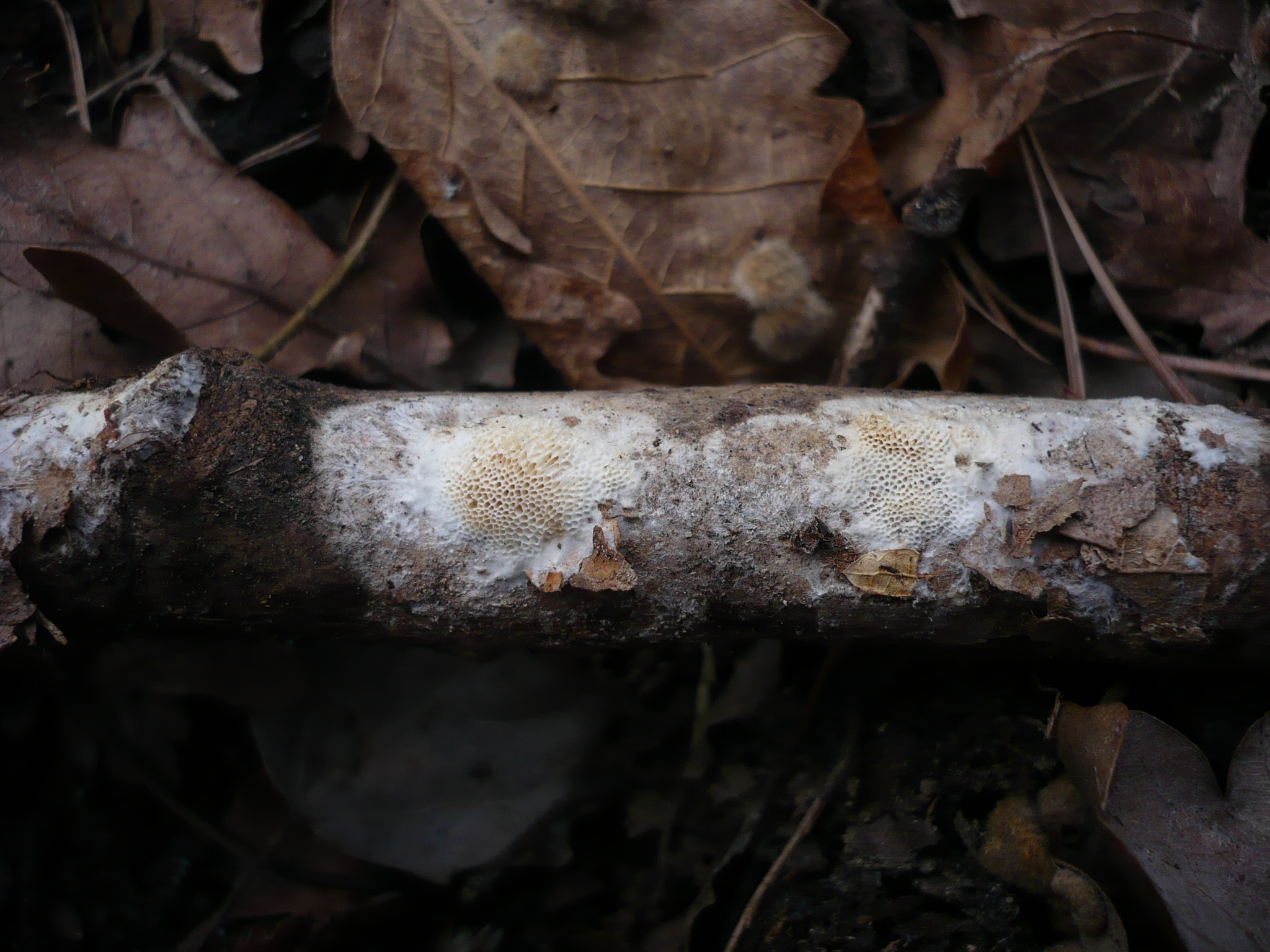
- Ceriporiopsis gilvescens

Scientific classification
- Kingdom: Fungi
- Division: Basidiomycota
- Class: Agaricomycetes
- Order: Polyporales
- Family: Phanerochaetaceae
- Genus: Ceriporiopsis; Domański (1963)

Type species
- Ceriporiopsis gilvescens (Bres.) Domański(1963)

Synonyms
- Porpomyces Jülich (1982); Pouzaroporia Vampola (1992)

= Ceriporiopsis =

Genus of fungi

Ceriporiopsis is a genus of fungi in the family Phanerochaetaceae. The genus is widely distributed, and, according to a 2008 estimate, contains about 25 species. Ceriporiopsis was circumscribed in 1963 by Polish mycologist Stanislaw Domanski. The genus is a wastebasket taxon, containing "species that share common macroscopic and microscopic characteristics, but are not necessarily related." Ceriporiopsis species are crust fungi that cause a white rot. They have a monomitic hyphal system, containing only generative hyphae, and these hyphae have clamp connections.

== Species ==
- Ceriporiopsis alboaurantia C.L.Zhao, B.K.Cui & Y.C.Dai (2014) – China
- Ceriporiopsis albonigrescens Núñez, Parmasto & Ryvarden (2001)
- Ceriporiopsis allantosporus Ryvarden (2016) – Colombia
- Ceriporiopsis aurantitingens (Corner) T.Hatt. (2002)
- Ceriporiopsis balaenae Niemelä (1985)
- Ceriporiopsis carnegiae (D.V.Baxter) Gilb. & Ryvarden (1985)
- Ceriporiopsis cerussata (Bres.) Ryvarden (1988)
- Ceriporiopsis cinnamomea Ryvarden, Gomes-Silva & Gibertoni (2016) – Brazil
- Ceriporiopsis consobrina (Bres.) Ryvarden (1988)
- Ceriporiopsis coprosmae (G.Cunn.) P.K.Buchanan & Ryvarden (1988)
- Ceriporiopsis costaricensis M.Mata & Ryvarden (2010)
- Ceriporiopsis cremea (Parmasto) Ryvarden (1986)
- Ceriporiopsis cremeicarnea (Corner) T.Hatt. (2002)
- Ceriporiopsis cystidiata Log.-Leite, G.V.C.Gonç. & Ryvarden (2001)
- Ceriporiopsis dentata Ryvarden (2016) – Mexico
- Ceriporiopsis egula C.J.Yu & Y.C.Dai (2007)
- Ceriporiopsis fimbriata C.L.Zhao & Y.C.Dai (2015)
- Ceriporiopsis flavilutea (Murrill) Ryvarden (1985)
- Ceriporiopsis gilvescens (Bres.) Domański (1963)
- Ceriporiopsis guidella Bernicchia & Ryvarden (2003)
- Ceriporiopsis herbicola Fortey & Ryvarden (2007)
- Ceriporiopsis hydnoidea Ryvarden & Iturr. (2004)
- Ceriporiopsis hypolateritius (Berk. ex Cooke) Ryvarden (2015)
- Ceriporiopsis irregularis Ryvarden (2016) – Venezuela
- Ceriporiopsis jelicii (Tortič & A.David) Ryvarden & Gilb. (1993)
- Ceriporiopsis jensii Læssøe & Ryvarden (2010)
- Ceriporiopsis kunmingensis C.L.Zhao (2016) – China
- Ceriporiopsis lagerheimii Læssøe & Ryvarden (2010) – Ecuador, China
- Ceriporiopsis lavendula B.K.Cui (2013)
- Ceriporiopsis lowei Rajchenb. (1987)
- Ceriporiopsis merulinus (Berk.) Rajchenb. (2003)
- Ceriporiopsis microporus T.T.Chang & W.N.Chou (1999)
- Ceriporiopsis mucida (Pers.) Gilb. & Ryvarden (1985)
- Ceriporiopsis namibiensis Leif Ryvarden (2016) – Namibia
- Ceriporiopsis nigra Ryvarden (2001)
- Ceriporiopsis obscura Ryvarden (2000)
- Ceriporiopsis portcrosensis (A.David) Ryvarden & Gilb. (1993)
- Ceriporiopsis pseudoplacenta Vlasák & Ryvarden (2012)
- Ceriporiopsis resinascens (Romell) Domański (1963)
- Ceriporiopsis rosea C.L.Zhao & Y.C.Dai (2015)
- Ceriporiopsis semisupina C.L.Zhao, B.K.Cui & Y.C.Dai (2014) – China
- Ceriporiopsis subsphaerospora (A.David) M.Pieri & B.Rivoire (1996)
- Ceriporiopsis subvermispora (Pilát) Gilb. & Ryvarden (1985)
- Ceriporiopsis umbrinescens (Murrill) Ryvarden (1985)
- Ceriporiopsis vinosa Ryvarden (2004)
