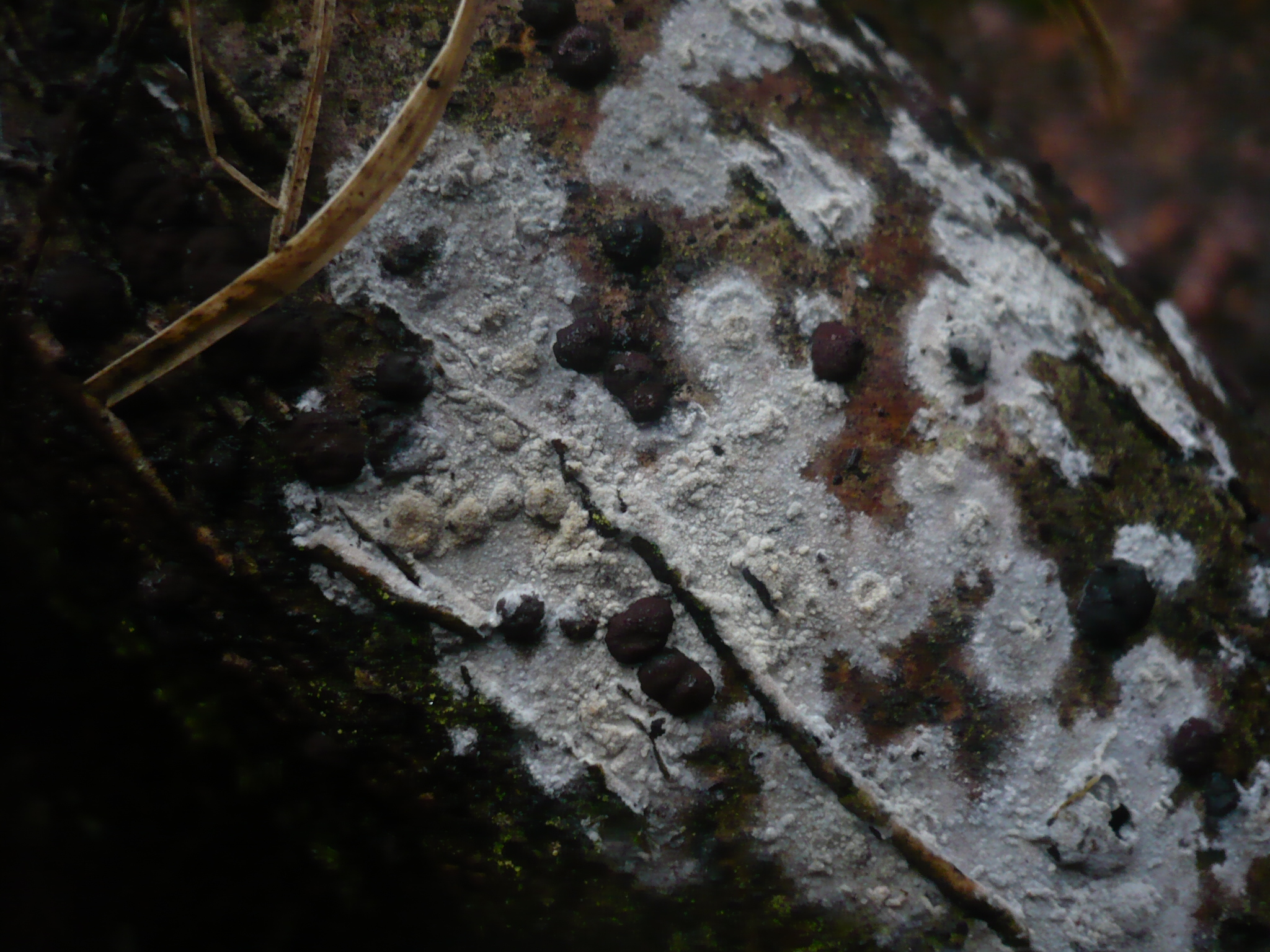
- Hyphodermella corrugata

Scientific classification
- Kingdom: Fungi
- Division: Basidiomycota
- Class: Agaricomycetes
- Order: Polyporales
- Family: Phanerochaetaceae
- Genus: Hyphodermella; J.Erikss. & Ryvarden (1976)

Type species
- Hyphodermella corrugata (Fr.) J.Erikss. & Ryvarden (1976)

Species
- H. brunneocontexta H. corrugata H. densa H. maunakeaensis H. ochracea H. poroides H. rosae

= Hyphodermella =

Genus of fungi

Hyphodermella is a genus of crust fungi in the family Phanerochaetaceae. It was circumscribed by mycologists John Eriksson and Leif Ryvarden in 1976.

== Species ==
- Hyphodermella brunneocontexta Duhem & Buyck (2011) – Mayotte
- Hyphodermella corrugata (Fr.) J.Erikss. & Ryvarden (1976)
- Hyphodermella densa Melo & Hjortstam (2003)
- Hyphodermella maunakeaensis Gilb. & Hemmes (2001)
- Hyphodermella ochracea (Bres.) Duhem (2010)
- Hyphodermella poroides – China
- Hyphodermella rosae (Bres.) Nakasone (2008)
