= Pseudolagarobasidium =

Scientific classification
- Kingdom: Fungi
- Division: Basidiomycota
- Class: Agaricomycetes
- Order: Polyporales
- Family: Phanerochaetaceae
- Genus: Pseudolagarobasidium; J.C.Jang & T.Chen (1985)

Type species
- Pseudolagarobasidium leguminicola J.C.Jang & T.Chen (1985)

Species
- P. acaciicola P. belizense P. calcareum P. conspicuum P. leguminicola P. modestum P. pronum P. pusillum P. venustum

Genus of fungi

Pseudolagarobasidium is a genus of nine species of crust fungi in the family Phanerochaetaceae. It was circumscribed in 1985. The type species, P. leguminicola, is associated with stem and root rot of the mimosoid tree Leucaena leucocephala. Pseudolagarobasidium species grow on wood, and may be saprobes, endophytes, or parasites.

== Species ==
- Pseudolagarobasidium acaciicola Ginns (2006) – South Africa
- Pseudolagarobasidium belizense Nakasone & D.L.Lindner (2012)
- Pseudolagarobasidium calcareum (Cooke & Massee) Sheng H.Wu (1990)
- Pseudolagarobasidium conspicuum (Pouzar) Nakasone (2015)
- Pseudolagarobasidium leguminicola J.C.Jang & T.Chen (1985)
- Pseudolagarobasidium modestum (Berk. ex Cooke) Nakasone & D.L.Lindner (2012)
- Pseudolagarobasidium pronum (Berk. & Broome) Nakasone & D.L.Lindner (2012)
- Pseudolagarobasidium pusillum Nakasone & D.L.Lindner (2012)
- Pseudolagarobasidium venustum (Hjortstam & Ryvarden) Nakasone & D.L.Lindner (2012)
