= Candelabrochaete =

Scientific classification
- Kingdom: Fungi
- Division: Basidiomycota
- Class: Agaricomycetes
- Order: Polyporales
- Family: Phanerochaetaceae
- Genus: Candelabrochaete; Boidin (1970)

Type species
- Candelabrochaete africana Boidin (1970)

Genus of fungi

Candelabrochaete is a genus of crust fungi in the family Phanerochaetaceae.

== Taxonomy ==
The genus was circumscribed by French mycologist Jacques Boidin in 1970. He originally included two species, C. langloisii, and the type, C. africana.

== Description ==
Similar to the genus Phanerochaete, Candelabrochaete features simple septa in the subicular hyphae and at the base of the basidia, and hyaline, thin-walled, nonamyloid spores. Several features distinguish Candelabrochaete from Phanerochaete. These include small, cylindrical to club-shaped (clavate) basidia, septate cystidia, a loosely interwoven subiculum (a mat of hyphae from which the fruitbody arises), and a loosely organized hymenium. This latter characteristic gives a farinaceous to woolly appearance to the fruitbodies.

== Species ==
As of May 2018, Index Fungorum accepts 12 species in Candelabrochaete:

- Candelabrochaete adnata Hjortstam (1995) – Brazil
- Candelabrochaete africana Boidin (1970) – Africa
- Candelabrochaete cirrata Hjortstam & Ryvarden (1986) – Argentina; British Virgin Islands; Brunei; Ghana; Kenya; Taiwan
- Candelabrochaete dispar Hjortstam & Ryvarden (1986) – Argentina
- Candelabrochaete eruciformis (G.Cunn.) Stalpers & P.K.Buchanan (1991)
- Candelabrochaete langloisii (Pat.) Boidin (1970)
- Candelabrochaete macaronesica M.Dueñas, Tellería & Melo (2008) – Faial Island; Madeira
- Candelabrochaete magnahypha (Burt) Burds. (1984)
- Candelabrochaete mexicana (Burt) P.Roberts (2000) – Cameroon; Venezuela
- Candelabrochaete neocaledonica Duhem & Buyck (2011) – New Caledonia
- Candelabrochaete simulans Hjortstam (1995) – Thailand
- Candelabrochaete verruculosa Hjortstam (1983) – Africa; Asia; Europe
