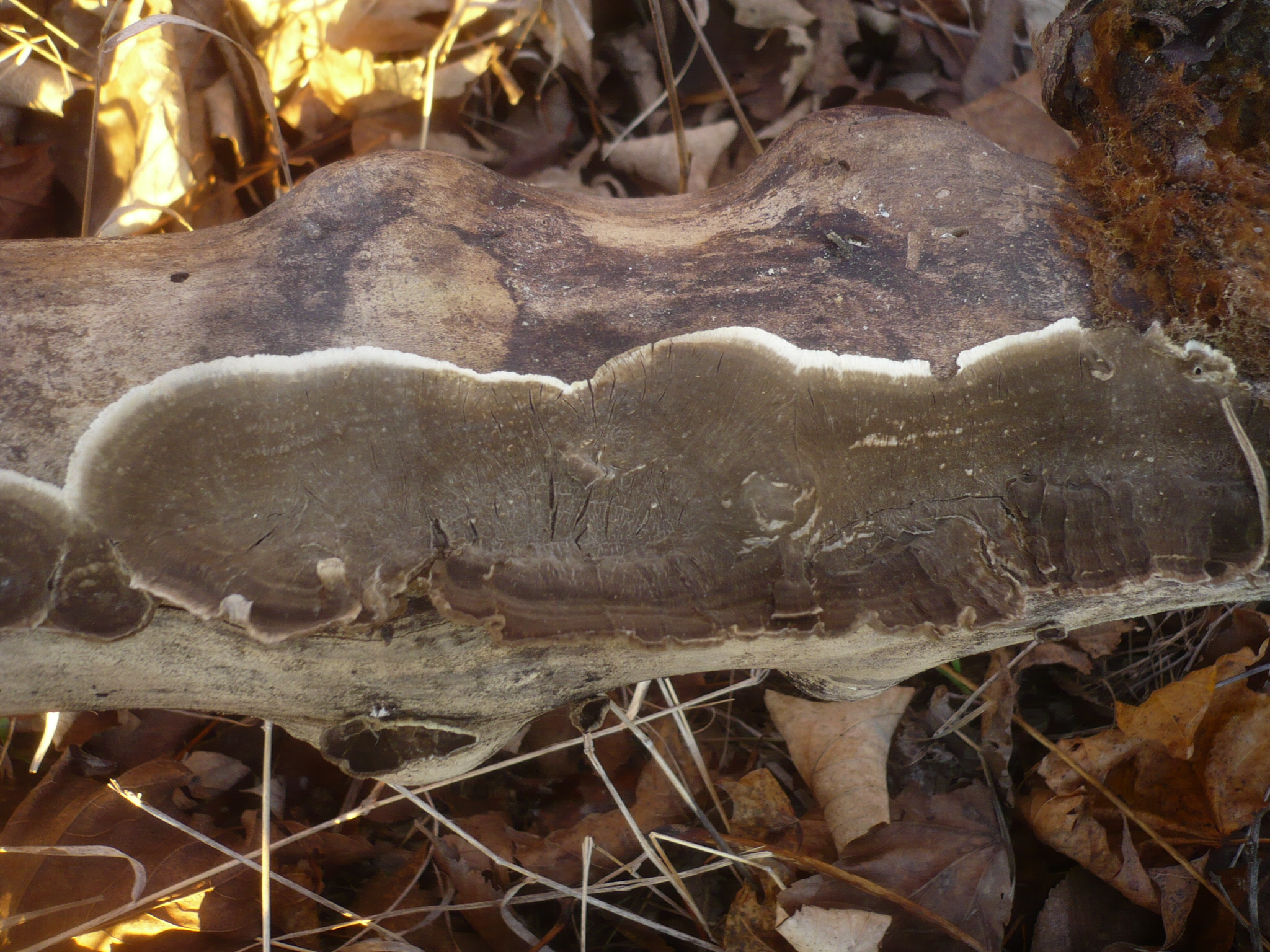
- Porostereum spadiceum

Scientific classification
- Kingdom: Fungi
- Division: Basidiomycota
- Class: Agaricomycetes
- Order: Polyporales
- Family: Phanerochaetaceae
- Genus: Porostereum; Pilát (1937)

Type species
- Porostereum phellodendri Pilát (1937)

Species
- P. phellodendri P. sharpianum P. spadiceum P. umbrinoalutaceum

= Porostereum =

Genus of fungi

Porostereum is a genus of poroid crust fungi in the family Phanerochaetaceae. It was circumscribed by Czech mycologist Albert Pilát in 1937.

== Species ==
- Porostereum phellodendri Pilát (1937)
- Porostereum sharpianum (A.L.Welden) Hjortstam & Ryvarden (1990)
- Porostereum spadiceum (Pers.) Hjortstam & Ryvarden (1990)
- Porostereum umbrinoalutaceum (Wakef.) Hjortstam & Ryvarden (1990)
