= Clas Bjerkander =

Swedish scientist (1735–1795)

Clas Bjerkander (23 September 1735, Skara – 1 August 1795) was a Swedish meteorologist, botanist, and entomologist.

A Lutheran pastor, Bjerkander studied at the University of Uppsala.

With Anders Dahl he wrote Svenska Topographiska Sällskapet i Skara ("Schwedische topographische Gesellschaft zu Skara") and, as sole author several short scientific papers on Microlepidoptera.

Taxa named for him include

- Pyralis bjerkandriana (Mehlmotte)
- Bjerkandera P. Karst

In 1778, Bjerkander was elected a member of the Royal Swedish Academy of Sciences.
