= Kalo, Democratic Republic of the Congo =

Kalo
- Location in Democratic Republic of the Congo
- Coordinates: 4°7′22″S 19°14′37″E
- Country: Democratic Republic of the Congo
- Province: Kwilu

Kalo is a community in Kwilu province, Democratic Republic of the Congo (DRC).
