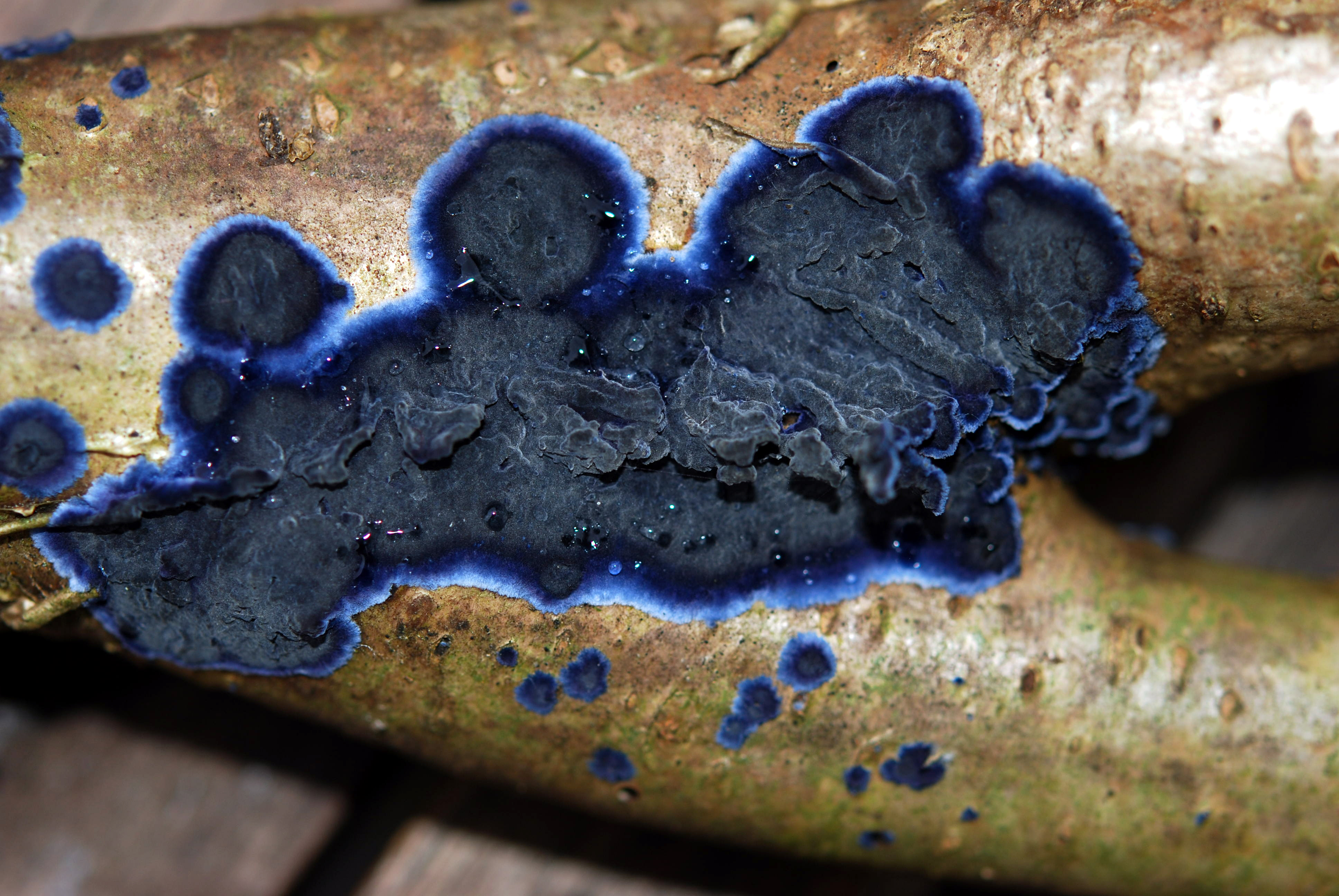

Scientific classification
- Kingdom: Fungi
- Division: Basidiomycota
- Class: Agaricomycetes
- Order: Polyporales
- Family: Phanerochaetaceae
- Genus: Terana
- Species: T. caerulea

Binomial name
- Terana caerulea (Lam.) Kuntze (1891)

Synonyms
- Byssus caerulea Lam. (1779); Terana coerulea (Lam.) Kuntze (1891); Corticium caeruleum (Lam.) Fr. (1938); Pulcherricium caeruleum (Lam.) Parmasto (1968)

= Terana caerulea =

Species of fungus

Terana caerulea (or Terana coerulea), commonly known as the cobalt crust fungus or velvet blue spread, is a saprobic crust fungus in the family Phanerochaetaceae. Usually found in warm, damp hardwood forests on the undersides of fallen logs and branches of deciduous trees, this unique fungus has been described as "blue velvet on a stick".

== Taxonomy ==
This species, which for a member of the corticioid fungi is relatively easy to identify, was first described in 1779 by Jean-Baptiste Lamarck, who is best known for proposing an early theory of evolution. Lamarck used the name Byssus caerulea, and various other designations were subsequently employed, until in 1828 Fries classified it as Thelephora violascens variety coerulea. According to rule 13.1.d. of the International Code of Botanical Nomenclature, valid publication of fungal names is treated as beginning with Fries's publication of "Systema Mycologicum" in 1821 and following years. This means that the correct species name is coerulea, not caerulea. Both names are found frequently in the literature. Lamarck's name Byssus is now applied to a plant genus - a fundamentally different organism.

In 1763 Michel Adanson had devised the genus name Terana for similar crust fungi and in 1891 Otto Kuntze included coerulea in that genus to create the modern name. Apart from this, the genus Pulcherricium was proposed by Parmasto in 1968 for this one species and the name Pulcherricium caerulea/coerulea is sometimes seen, but the designation Terana is better established.

== Description ==
Terana caerulea is resupinate, meaning the fruiting body lies on the surface of the substrate, with the hymenium exposed to the outside. The fruiting body is 2–6 mm thick. It is dark blue with a paler margin, with a velvety or waxy texture when moist, but crusty and brittle when dry. The fruiting body is firmly attached to its growing surface except at the edges. In nature, the fungus surface is typically found pointing downward, which helps facilitate spore dispersal. It usually grows on dead deciduous wood, often ash, maple, oak and hazel. The spore print is white. Spores are ellipsoidal, smooth, thin-walled, hyaline or pale blue, with dimensions of 7–12 by 4–7 μm. The four-spored basidia are club-shaped, hyaline or blue, with dimensions of 40–60 by 5–7 μm.

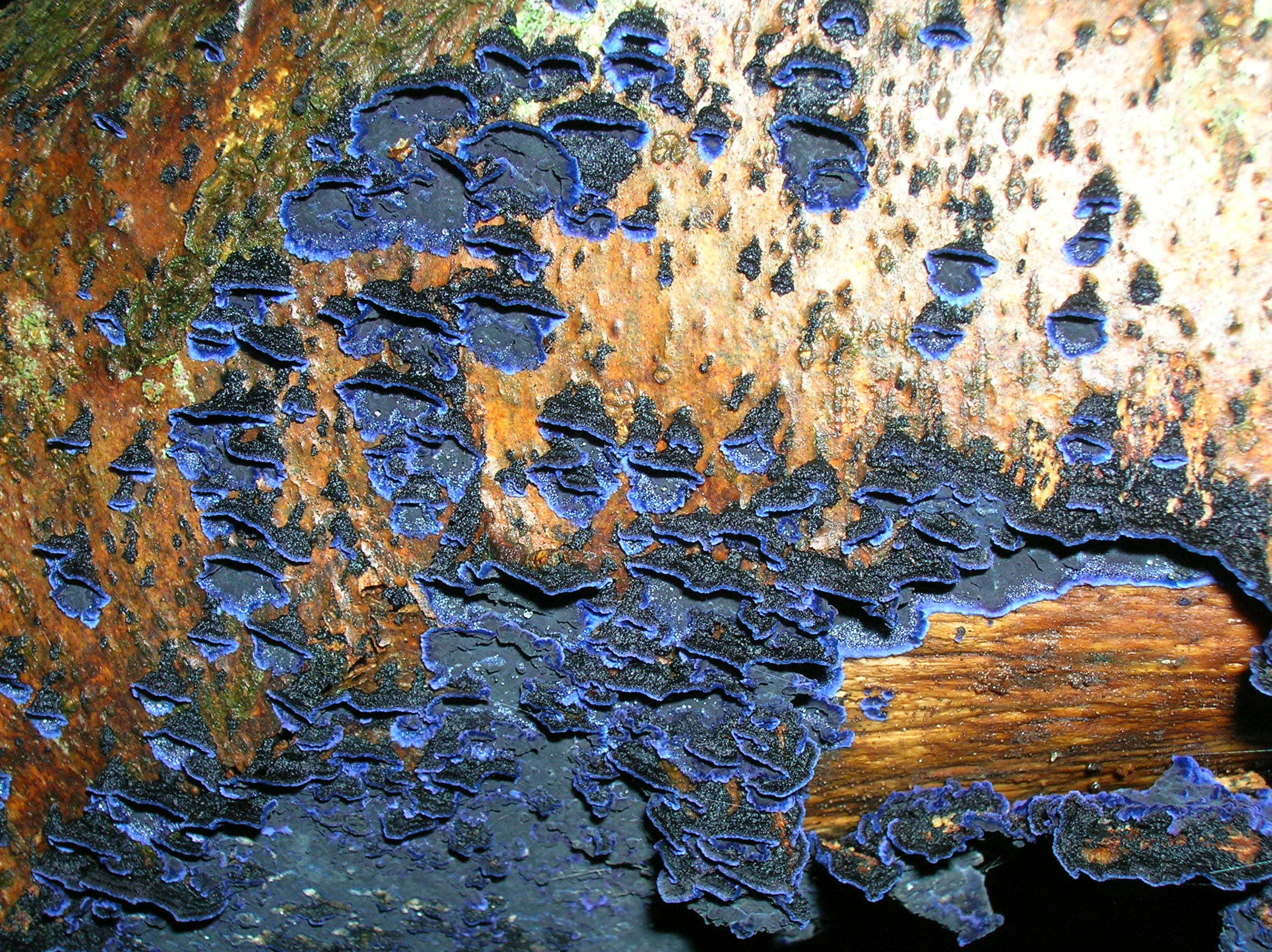
Specimen in Scotland

== Distribution ==
The cobalt crust has a worldwide distribution in warmer climates, and has been reported from Asia, Africa, New Zealand, Eastern North America, the Canary Islands, Europe, Taiwan, Thailand, and Turkey.

Close up on specimen in West Virginia, USA

== Chemistry ==
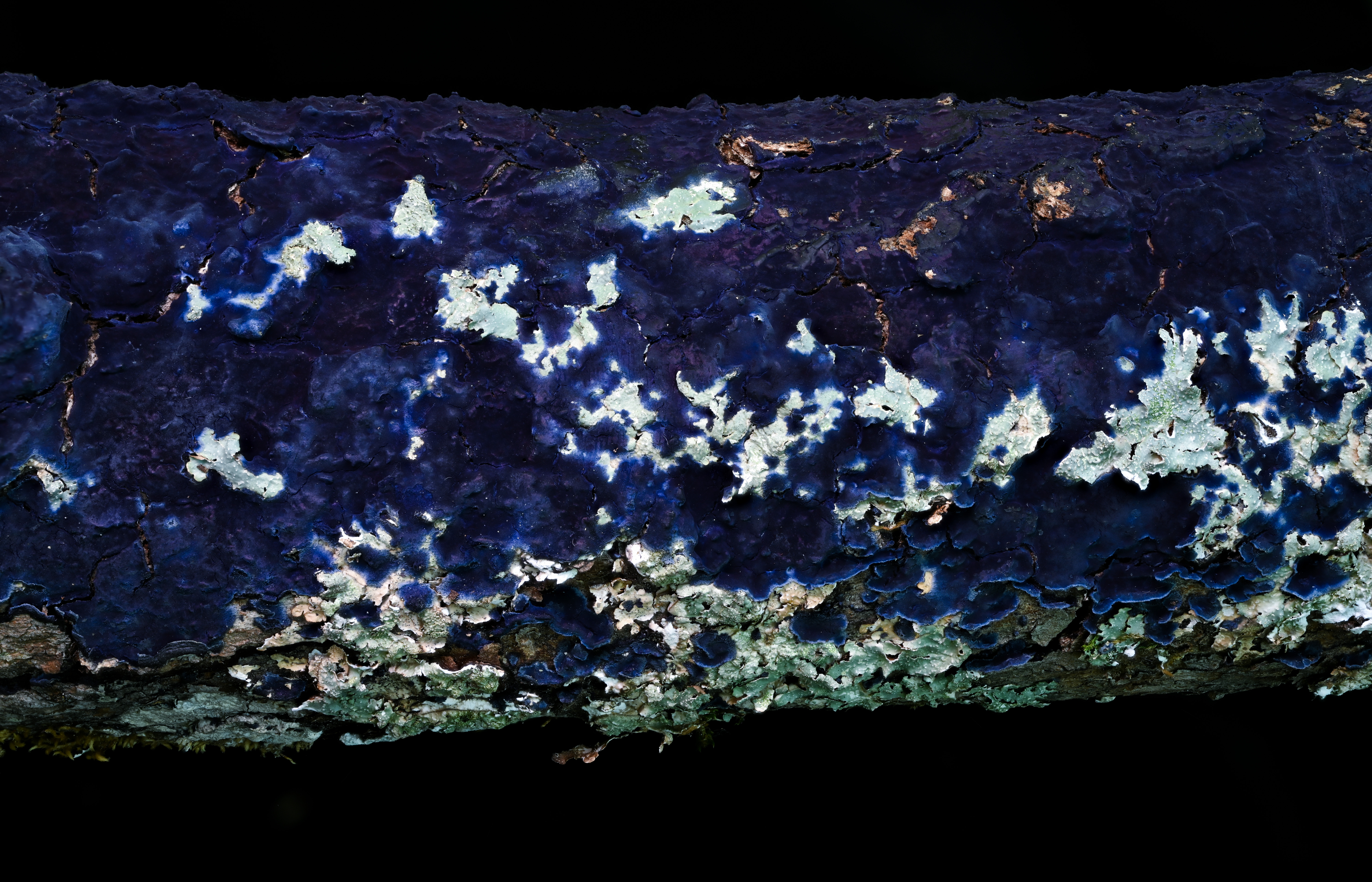
Specimen with Punctelia lichen

The blue pigment of this fungus was shown to be a mixture of polymers structurally related to thelephoric acid.

When activated by external treatments such as high temperature (42 °C (108 °F)), exposure to vapors of toxic solvents, or contact with a water-toluene mixture, T. caerulea produces an antibiotic named cortalcerone (2-hydroxy-6H-3-pyrone-2-carboxaldehyde hydrate), that inhibits the growth of Streptococcus pyogenes. The metabolic biosynthesis of this compound starting from the initial precursor glucose has also been studied. It has also been seen to neutralize weaker acids such as malic, citric, & 30% nitric acid.

Compounds with so-called "benzobisbenzofuranoid" skeletons have been isolated and identified from T. caerulea, namely, corticins A, B, and C.

== In culture ==
The species was chosen as fungus of the year for 2009 by the German Mycological Society.
