= New Zealand laurel =

New Zealand laurel is a common name for several plants and may refer to:

- Corynocarpus laevigatus, an evergreen tree with large glossy leaves endemic to New Zealand
- Coprosma repens, a popular shrub which is resistant to salt spray
