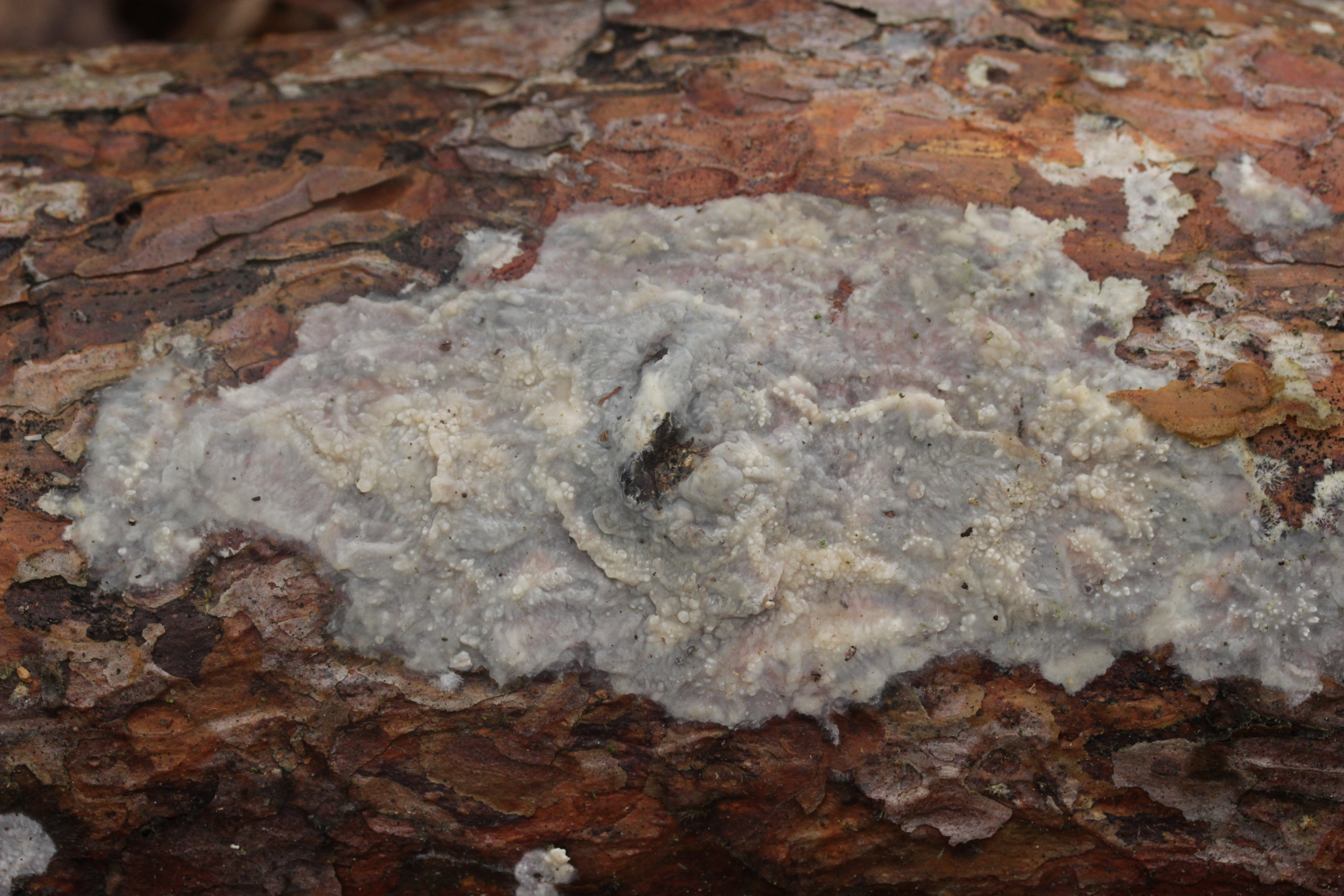
- Phlebiopsis gigantea

Scientific classification
- Kingdom: Fungi
- Division: Basidiomycota
- Class: Agaricomycetes
- Order: Polyporales
- Family: Phanerochaetaceae
- Genus: Phlebiopsis; Jülich (1978)

Type species
- Phlebiopsis gigantea (Fr.) Jülich (1978)

= Phlebiopsis =

Genus of fungi

Phlebiopsis is a genus of poroid crust fungi in the family Phanerochaetaceae. The genus contains 11 species, which collectively have a widespread distribution. The genome sequence of the type species, Phlebiopsis gigantea, was published in 2014.

== Species ==
- Phlebiopsis afibulata (G.Cunn.) Stalpers (1985) – New Zealand
- Phlebiopsis bicornis Douanla-Meli (2009) – Cameroon
- Phlebiopsis crassa (Lév.) D.Floudas & Hibbett (2015)
- Phlebiopsis darjeelingensis Dhingra (1987) – Himalayas
- Phlebiopsis erubescens Hjortstam & Ryvarden (2005)
- Phlebiopsis flavidoalba (Cooke) Hjortstam (1987)
- Phlebiopsis galochroa (Bres.) Hjortstam & Ryvarden (1980)
- Phlebiopsis gigantea (Fr.) Jülich (1978)
- Phlebiopsis himalayensis Dhingra (1987) – Himalayas
- Phlebiopsis lamprocystidiata (Sheng H.Wu) Sheng H.Wu & Hallenb. (2010)
- Phlebiopsis mussooriensis Priyanka, Dhingra & N.Kaur (2011) – India
- Phlebiopsis ravenelii (Cooke) Hjortstam (1987)
