= Kurt Hjortstam =

Swedish mycologist (1933–2009)

- Born: 11 July 1933; Alingsås, Sweden
- Died: 9 December 2009 (aged 76)
- Known for: Contributions to taxonomic mycology
- Scientific career
- Fields: Mycology
- Author abbrev. (botany): Hjortstam

Kurt Egon Hjortstam (1933–2009) was a Swedish mycologist, specialising in the taxonomy of corticioid fungi.

Kurt Hjortstam received no formal education beyond primary school, but as an adult developed an interest in the vascular plants of Sweden. During an excursion with the Gothenburg Botanical Society he met Prof. John Eriksson who encouraged him to take up the study of corticioid fungi (fungi forming effused fruit bodies on wood). This resulted in the publication of a joint paper in 1969 describing several new species.

In 1971 he was engaged as an assistant at the University of Gothenburg to work as co-author on the eight-volume reference work, Corticiaceae of North Europe. He was later taken on as an assistant at the University of Oslo where he had access to Prof. Leif Ryvarden's extensive collections of tropical corticioid fungi. Hjortstam developed his expertise in tropical species, visiting Brazil, and was latterly employed as a taxonomic mycologist at the Royal Botanic Gardens, Kew. He was awarded an honorary doctorate at the University of Gothenburg in 1989.

Altogether, Kurt Hjortstam authored 139 scientific papers, describing 54 new genera and 181 new species of corticioid fungi. The genera Kurtia and Hjortstamia are named in his honour, as well as the species Hyphoderma hjortstamii, Tomentella hjortstamiana, and Xylodon hjortstamii.
