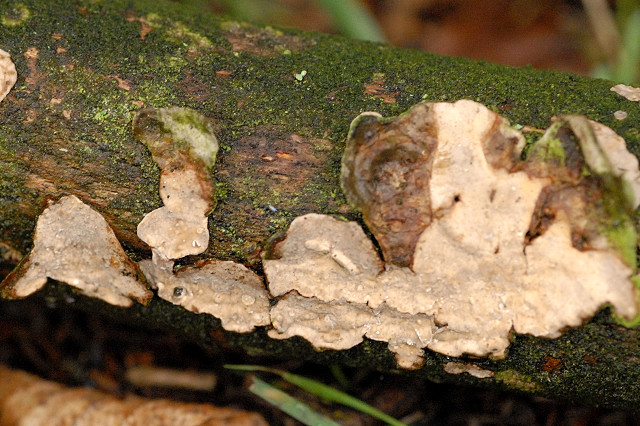
- Phanerochaete velutina

Scientific classification
- Kingdom: Fungi
- Division: Basidiomycota
- Class: Agaricomycetes
- Order: Polyporales
- Family: Phanerochaetaceae; Jülich (1982)

Type genus
- Phanerochaete P.Karst (1889)

Synonyms
- Hapalopilaceae Jülich (1981); Bjerkanderaceae Jülich (1981)

= Phanerochaetaceae =

Family of fungi

The Phanerochaetaceae are a family of mostly crust fungi in the order Polyporales.

== Taxonomy ==
Phanerochaetaceae was first conceived by Swedish mycologist John Eriksson in 1958 as the subfamily Phanerochaetoideae of the Corticiaceae. It was later published validly by Erast Parmasto in 1986, and raised to familial status by Swiss mycologist Walter Jülich in 1982. The type genus is Phanerochaete.

In 2007, Karl-Henrik Larsson proposed using the name Phanerochaetaceae to refer to the clade of crust fungi clustered near Phanerochaete. In 2013, a more extensive molecular analysis showed that the Phanerochaetaceae were a subclade of the large phlebioid clade, which also contains members of the families Meruliaceae and Irpicaceae. The generic limits of Phanerochaete were revised in 2015, and new genera were added in 2016. As of April 2018, Index Fungorum accepts 30 genera and 367 species in the family.

== Description ==
Most Phanerochaetaceae species are crust-like. Their hyphal system is monomitic (containing only generative hyphae), and these hyphae lack clamp connections. Their spores are thin-walled, smooth, and hyaline (translucent). Cystidia are often present in the hymenium. Although rare, some species have a polyporoid form, a dimitic hyphal system, and clamp connections. Phanerochaetaceae fungi produce a white rot.

== Genera ==
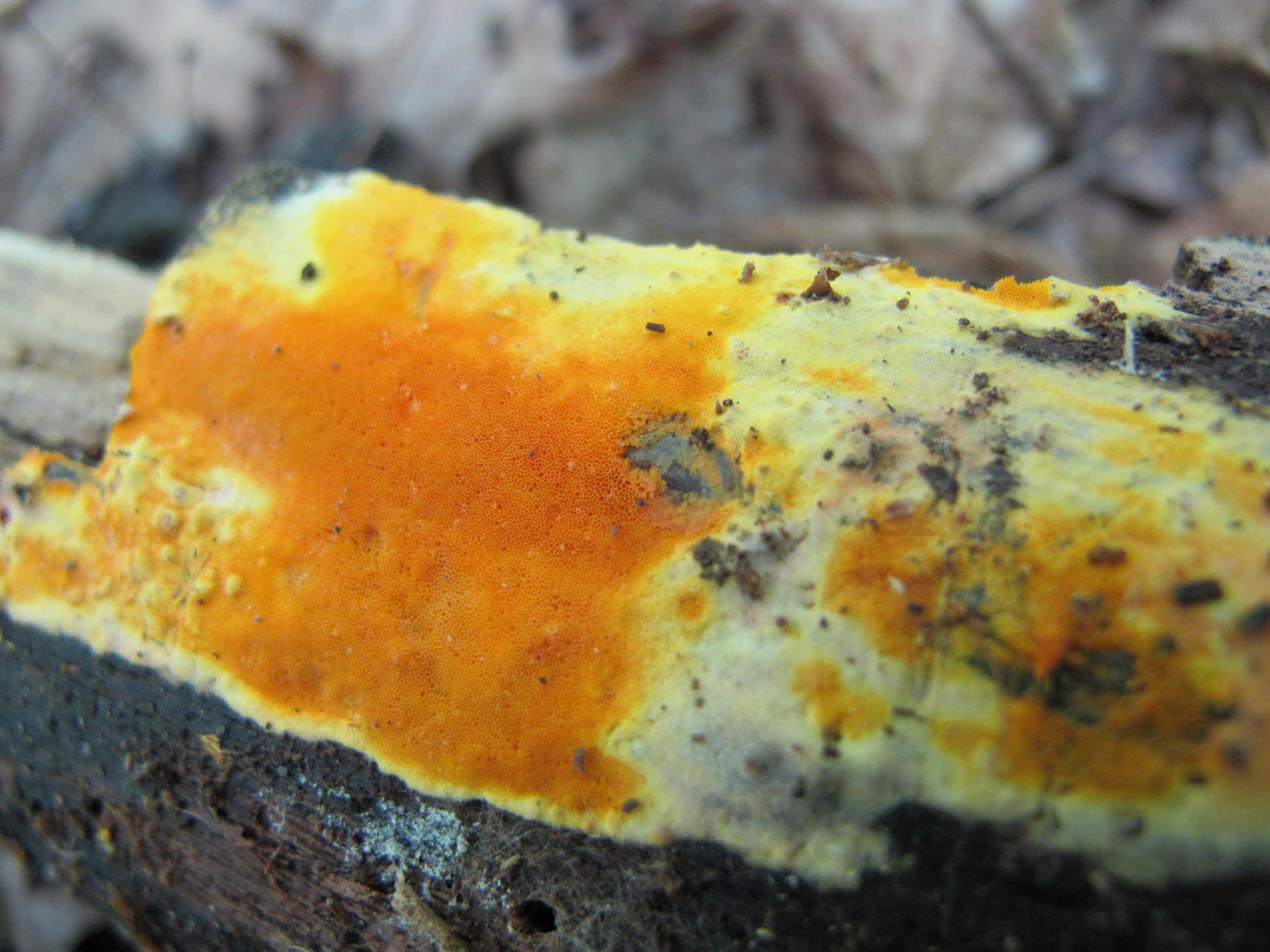
Ceriporia spissa

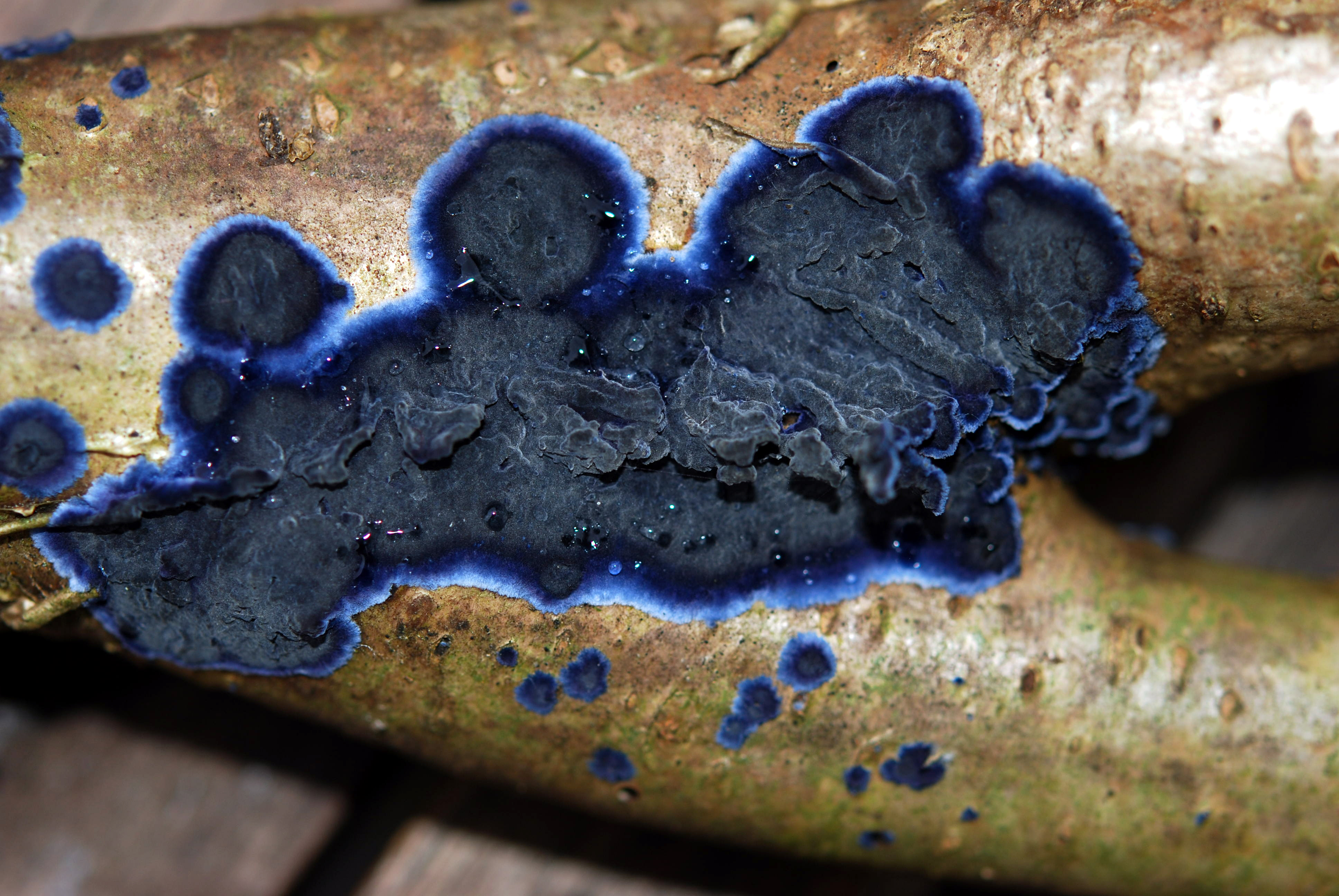
Terana caerulea

- Amethicium Hjortstam (1983); 1 species
- Bjerkandera
- Australicium Hjortstam & Ryvarden (2002); 2 species
- Australohydnum Jülich (1978); 2 species
- Byssomerulius Parmasto (1967); 12 species
- Candelabrochaete Boidin (1970); 12 species
- Ceriporia Donk (1933); 49 species
- Ceriporiopsis Domański (1963); 34 species
- Climacodon P.Karst. (1881); 7 species
- Geliporus Yuan Yuan, Jia J.Chen & S.H.He (2017)
- Hjortstamia Boidin & Gilles (2003); 13 species
- Hyphodermella J.Erikss. & Ryvarden (1976); 6 species
- Inflatostereum D.A.Reid (1965); 2 species
- Meruliopsis Bondartsev (1959); 2 species
- Meruliporia Murrill (1942)
- Odontoefibula Che C. Chen & Sheng H. Wu (2018); 1 species
- Oxychaete Miettinen (2016); 1 species
- Phanerina Miettinen (2016); 1 species
- Phanerochaete P.Karst. (1889); 92 species
- Phanerodontia Hjortstam & Ryvarden (2010); 4 species
- Phaneroites Hjortstam & Ryvarden (2010); 1 species
- Phlebiopsis Jülich (1978); 12 species
- Porostereum Pilát (1937); 4 species
- Pouzaroporia Vampola (1992); 1 species
- Pseudolagarobasidium J.C.Jang & T.Chen (1985); 9 species
- Rhizochaete Gresl., Nakasone & Rajchenb. (2004); 6 species
- Riopa D.A.Reid (1969); 2 species
- Roseograndinia Hjortstam & Ryvarden (2005); 1 species
- Terana Adans. (1763); 1 species
