= Petter Adolf Karsten =

Finnish mycologist

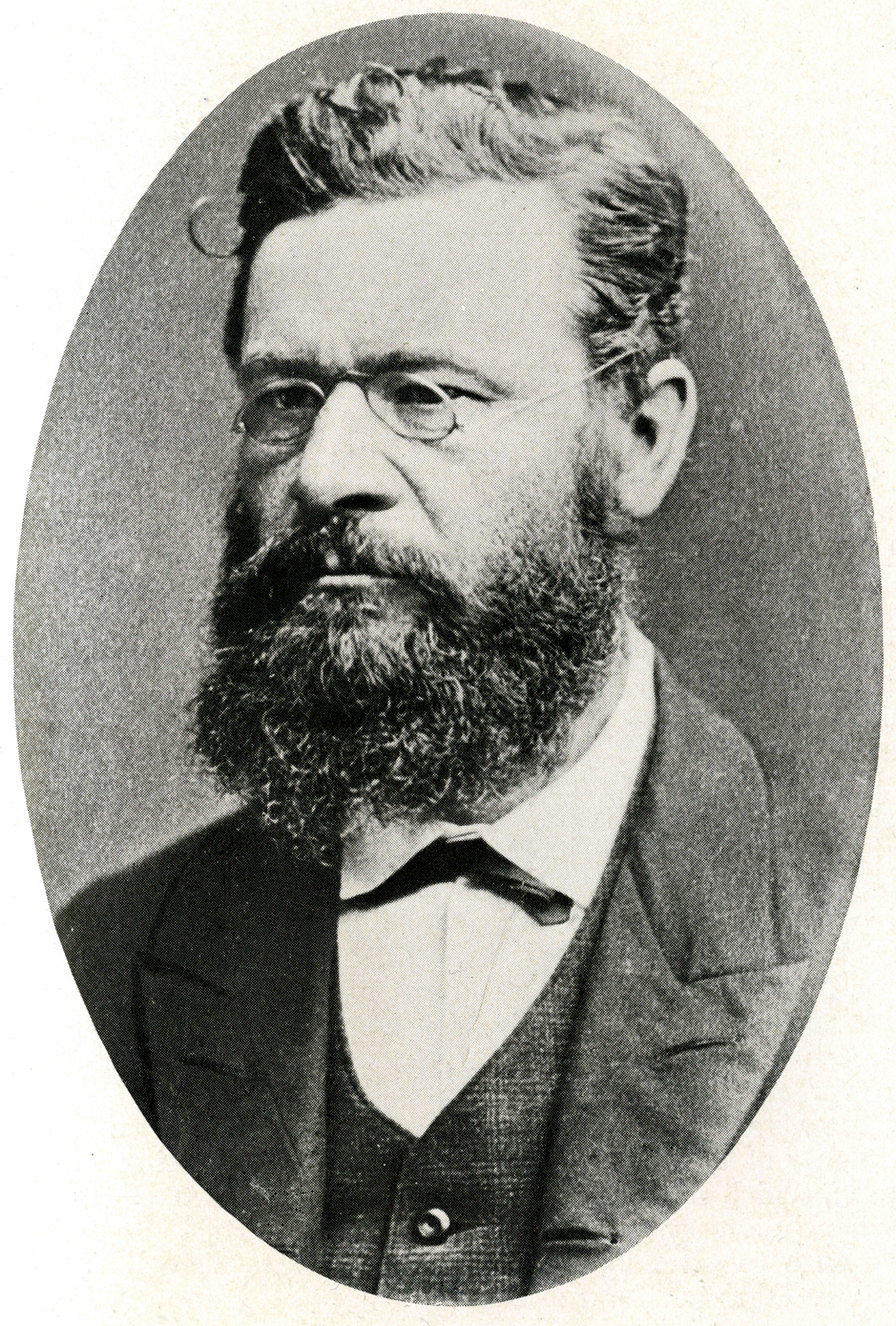
Petter Karsten

Petter Adolf Karsten (16 February 1834 – 22 March 1917) was a Finnish mycologist, the foremost expert on the fungi of Finland in his day, and known in consequence as the "father of Finnish mycology".

Karsten was born in Merimasku near Turku, studied at the University of Helsinki, and then moved to the inland of Tammela, where he spent most of his life with teaching botany and doing research at the Mustiala Agriculture Institute (now the Faculty of Agriculture of the HAMK University of Applied Sciences).

He amassed a vast collection, both by his own efforts and those of his correspondents, and named about 200 new genera and 2,000 new species. Between 1861 and 1870 Karsten edited the exsiccata series Fungi Fenniae exsiccati. Samling af Finska svampar with 1,000 numbers. In his mycological studies he extensively used the microscope and can be considered as the pioneer of fungal microscopy. Karstenia, the international journal of mycology published by the Finnish Mycological Society, is dedicated to Karsten.

== Honours ==
In 1885, botanist Elias Magnus Fries published Karstenia is a genus of fungi in the order Rhytismatales. It was named in Petter Adolf Karsten's honour.

In 1889, he published Onnia, which is a genus of fungi in the family Hymenochaetaceae. The genus name of Onnia was in honour of Onni Alexander Karsten (1868–1958), who was a Finnish gardener and Petter Adolf Karsten's son.

In 1969, Harri Harmaja published Karstenella which is a genus of fungi in the order Pezizales (of family Karstenellaceae).

Lastly, Karsteniomyces, which is a genus of lichenicolous fungi of unknown familial, ordinal, and class placement in the Ascomycota. The genus was circumscribed by David Leslie Hawksworth in 1980.

== See also ==
- Category:Taxa named by Petter Adolf Karsten
