= S. setosa =

S. setosa may refer to:

- Sabulodes setosa, a species of moth in the genus Sabulodes
- Sacculina setosa, a species of rhizocephalan in the genus Sacculina
- Salmacina setosa, a species of polychaete worm in the genus Salmacina
- Saraiella setosa, a species of fly in the family Psychodidae
- Sarcodontia setosa, a species of fungus
- Scaptomyza setosa, a species of fruit fly in the genus Scaptomyza
- Scatella setosa, a species of brine fly in the genus Scatella
- Schedopontocypris setosa, a species of ostracod in the family Pontocyprididae
- Schistochilopsis setosa, a species of liverwort in the family Scapaniaceae
- Sciacharis setosa, a species of rove beetle in the subfamily Scydmaeninae
- Sciophila setosa, a species of fungus gnat in the genus Sciophila
- Scutellinia setosa, a species of fungus
- Selenosporella setosa, a species of fungus in the class Sordariomycetes
- Serginella setosa, a species of foraminiferan in the superfamily Parathuramminoidea
- Sesato setosa, a species of spider
- Setaria setosa, a species of grass in the genus Setaria
- Setohyllisia setosa, a species of longhorn beetle
- Setophaeosphaeria setosa, a species of fungus in the family Phaeosphaeriaceae
- Sida setosa, a species of flowering plant in the genus Sida
- Sidalcea setosa, a species of flowering plant in the genus Sidalcea
- Sigambra setosa, a species of polychaete worm in the family Pilargidae
- Simsia setosa, a species of flowering plant in the genus Simsia
- Sinomorpha setosa, a species of millipede in the family Paradoxosomatidae
- Siphona setosa, a species of fly
- Smilax setosa, a species of flowering plant in the genus Smilax
- Sophronica setosa, a species of longhorn beetle
- Sparganothina setosa, a species of moth
- Sphegina setosa, a species of drone fly
- Sphenella setosa, a species of fruit fly
- Spiniclava setosa, a species of wasp in the family Pteromalidae
- Spio setosa, a species of polychaete worm in the family Spionidae
- Sporidesmiella setosa, a species of fungus in the subclass Diaporthomycetidae
- Stelanemia setosa, a species of grass in the genus Stelanemia
- Stenocopia setosa, a species of copepod in the family Ameiridae
- Stenopleonoscia setosa, a species of isopod in the family Philosciidae
- Stenothoe setosa, a species of amphipod in the family Stenothoidae
- Sternotrigon setosa, a species of darkling beetle in the subfamily Pimeliinae
- Sthenelais setosa, a species of polychaete worm in the family Sigalionidae
- Streblocera setosa, a species of wasp in the subfamily Euphorinae
- Stricklandiana setosa, a species of ground beetle in the genus Stricklandiana
- Strobilanthes setosa, a species of flowering plant in the genus Strobilanthes
- Strongylovelia setosa, a species of true bug in the family Veliidae
- Strychnos setosa, a species of flowering plant in the genus Strychnos
- Suctobelbella setosa, a species of mite in the family Suctobelbidae
- Sycandra setosa, a species of sponge in the genus Sycandra
- Symphylella oligosetosa, a species of symphylan in the family Scolopendrellidae
- Synaptospora setosa, a species of fungus in the order Sordariales
- Synechocera setosa, a species of jewel beetle in the subfamily Agrilinae
- Syscia setosa, a species of ant in the genus Syscia
