= A. hessei =

A. hessei may refer to:

- Abacetus hessei, a ground beetle
- Acanthiophilus hessei, a synonym of Sphenella hessei, a tephritid fly found in South Africa
- Anastoechus hessei, a bee fly found in the United States
