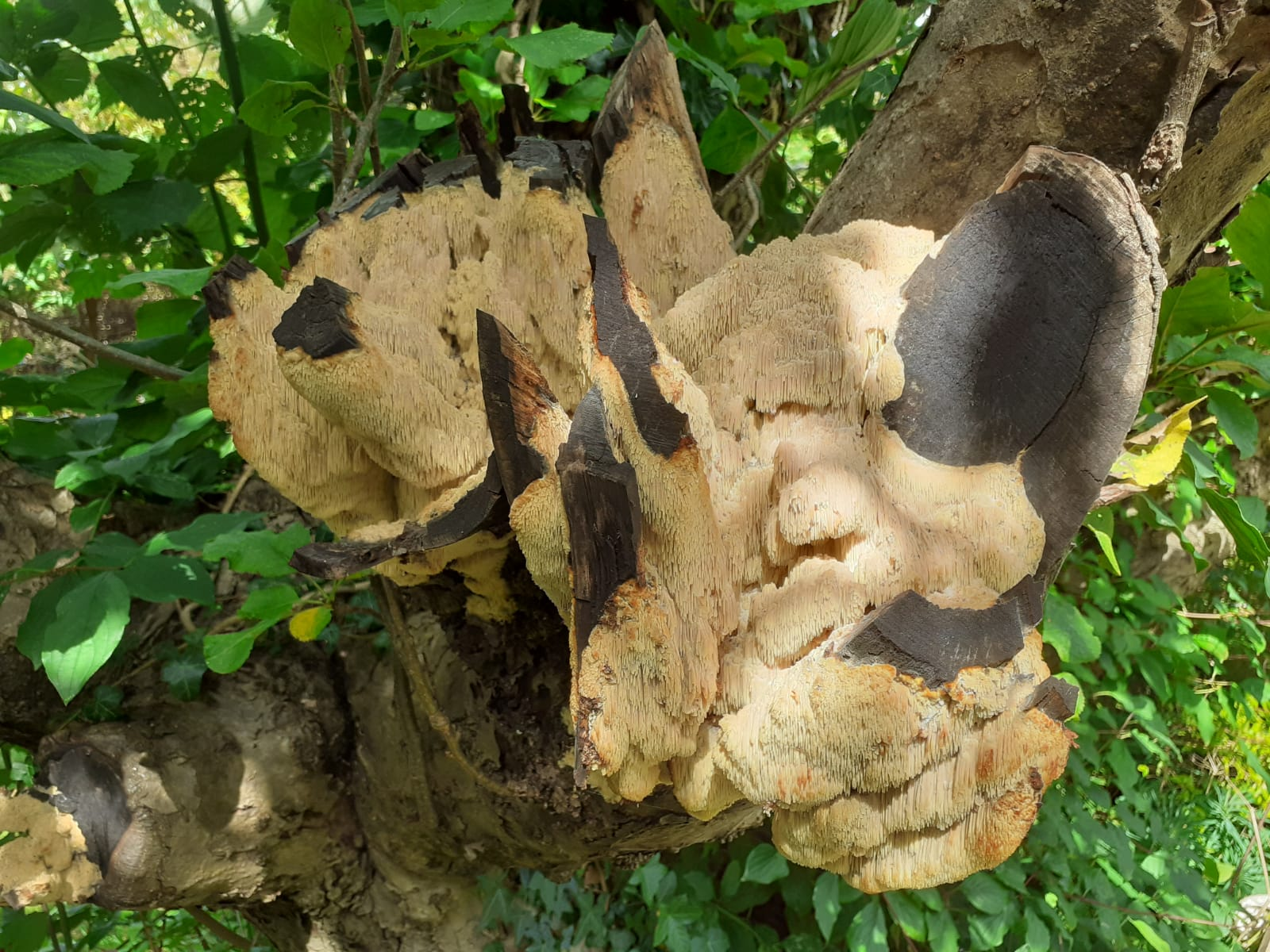
- Fruiting body fracturing wood of apple tree

Scientific classification
- Kingdom: Fungi
- Division: Basidiomycota
- Class: Agaricomycetes
- Order: Polyporales
- Family: Meruliaceae
- Genus: Sarcodontia
- Species: S. crocea

Binomial name
- Sarcodontia crocea (Schwein.) Kotl. (1953)

Synonyms
- Sistotrema croceum Schwein. (1822); Hydnum croceum (Schwein.) Fr. (1828); Hydnum schiedermayeri var. kamerunensis Bres.; Sarcodontia mali Schulzer (1866); Hydnum schiedermayeri Heufl. (1870); Kneiffia setigera var. pomicola Schulzer (1874); Hericium croceum (Schwein.) Banker (1906); Manina schiedermayeri (Heufl.) Banker (1912); Dryodon schiedermayeri (Heufl.) Ricken(1918)

= Sarcodontia crocea =

Species of fungus

Sarcodontia crocea is a species of toothed crust fungus in the family Meruliaceae. The species was first described scientifically in 1822 by Lewis David de Schweinitz, who called it Sistotrema croceum. It was transferred to the genus Sarcodontia by Czech mycologist František Kotlaba in 1953. S. crocea usually occurs on old fruit trees, in which it causes a white rot. It is found in Europe, Asia, and North America. It is red-listed in several European countries.

Fresh fruit bodies of S. crocea have an intense, fruity odour resembling pineapple or grated apples. The furan-derived compounds 4-(furan-3-yl)benzaldehyde and 4-(5-oxotetrahydrofuran-3-yl)benzaldehyde have been identified as contributing to this odour.
