= Leucandra =

Leucandra may refer to:

- Leucandra (plant), a synonym for Tragia, a flowering plant genus
- Leucandra (sponge), a calcareous sponge genus
