= Sarcodontia fragilissima =

Scientific classification
- Kingdom: Fungi
- Division: Basidiomycota
- Class: Agaricomycetes
- Order: Polyporales
- Family: Meruliaceae
- Genus: Sarcodontia
- Species: S. fragilissima

Binomial name
- Sarcodontia fragilissima (Berk. & M.A.Curtis) Nikol. (1961)

Synonyms
- Hydnum fragilissimum Berk. & M.A.Curtis (1873); Acia fragilissima (Berk. & M.A.Curtis) Pat. (1900); Oxydontia fragilissima (Berk. & M.A.Curtis) L.W.Mill. (1933); Odontia fragilissima (Berk. & M.A.Curtis) C.A.Br. (1935); Mycoacia fragilissima (Berk. & M.A.Curtis) L.W.Mill. (1943); Caldesiella fragilissima (Berk. & M.A.Curtis) Pat. (1972)

Species of fungus

Sarcodontia fragilissima is a species of toothed crust fungus in the family Meruliaceae. The fungus was originally described as Hydnum fragilissimum by Miles Joseph Berkeley and Moses Ashley Curtis in 1873. It was transferred to the genus Sarcodontia by T.L. Nikolajeva in 1961.
