= Sarcodontia sibirica =

Scientific classification
- Kingdom: Fungi
- Division: Basidiomycota
- Class: Agaricomycetes
- Order: Polyporales
- Family: Meruliaceae
- Genus: Sarcodontia
- Species: S. sibirica

Binomial name
- Sarcodontia sibirica (Albert Pilát) Nikol. (1961)

Synonyms
- Acia sibirica Pilát (1936)

Species of fungus

Sarcodontia sibirica is a species of toothed crust fungus in the family Meruliaceae. It was originally described by Czech mycologist Albert Pilát in 1936 as Acia sibirica. T.L. Nikolajeva transferred it to the genus Sarcodontia in 1961.
