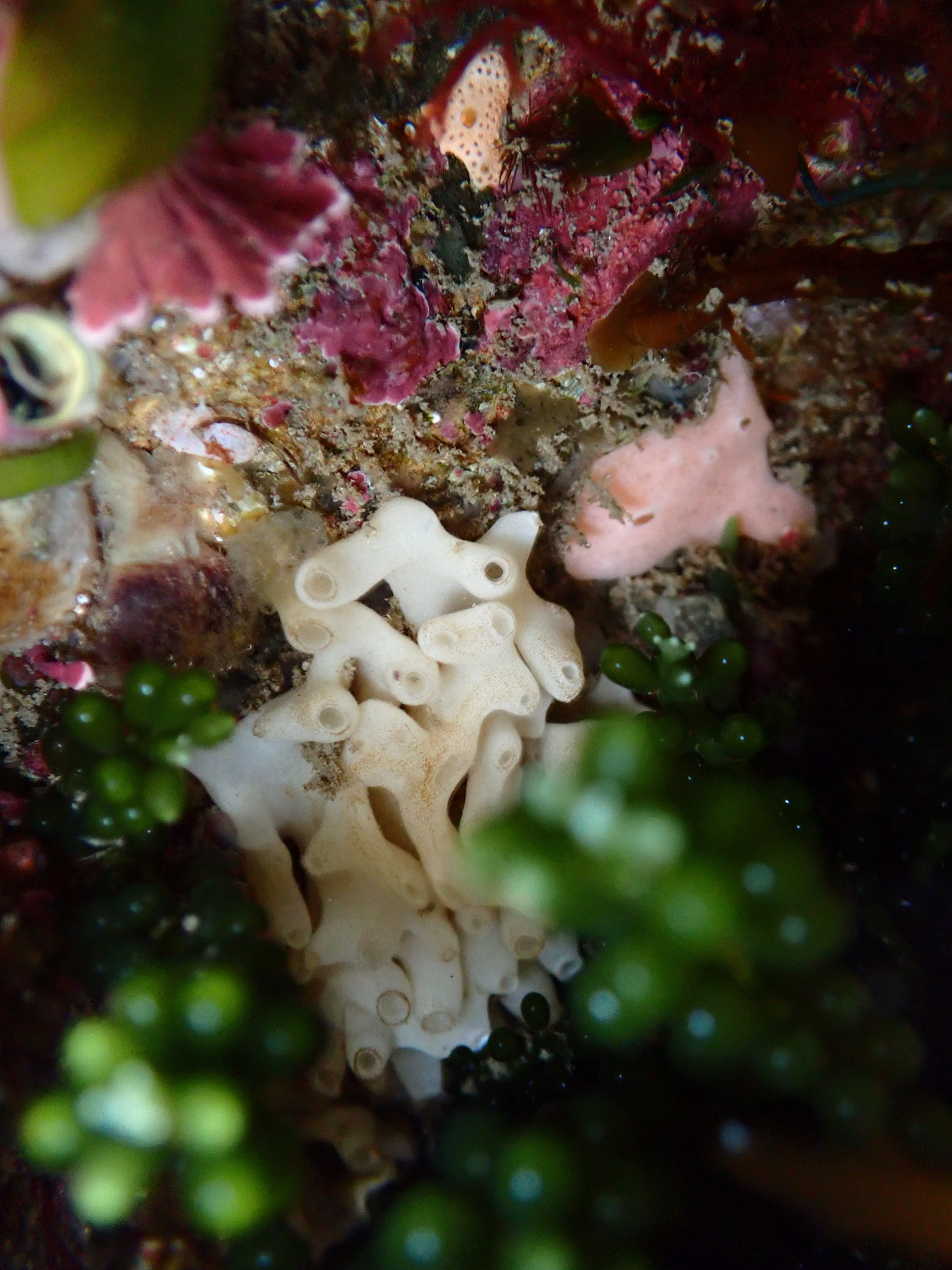

Scientific classification
- Kingdom: Animalia
- Phylum: Porifera
- Class: Calcarea
- Order: Leucosolenida
- Family: Grantiidae
- Genus: Grantia
- Species: G. ramulosa

Binomial name
- Grantia ramulosa Dendy, 1924

= Grantia ramulosa =

Species of sponge

Grantia ramulosa is a species of calcareous sponge belonging to the family Grantiidae.
