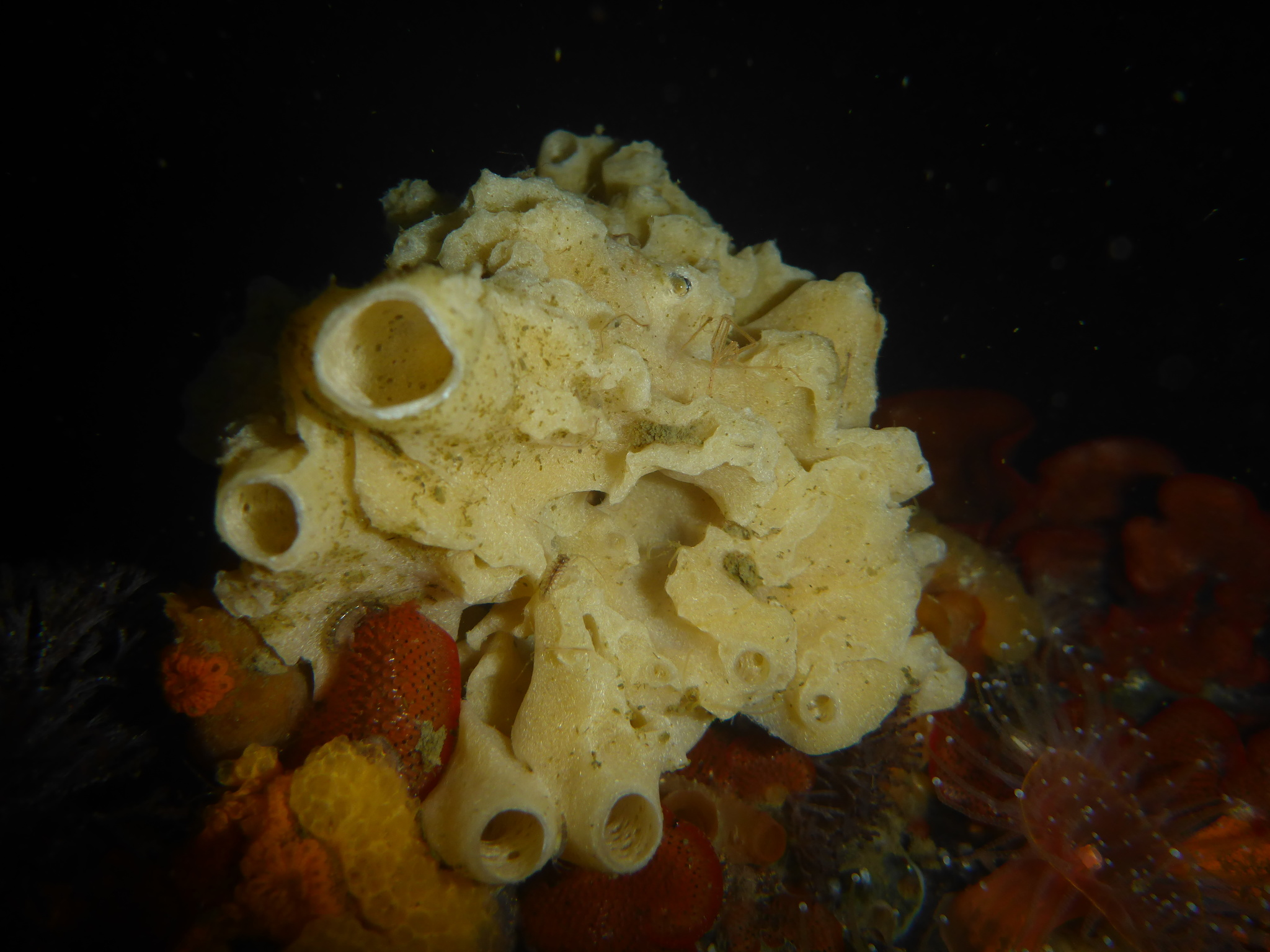

Scientific classification
- Kingdom: Animalia
- Phylum: Porifera
- Class: Calcarea
- Order: Leucosolenida
- Family: Grantiidae
- Genus: Leucandra
- Species: L. losangelensis

Binomial name
- Leucandra losangelensis de Laubenfels, 1930

= Leucandra losangelensis =

Species of sponge

Leucandra losangelensis is a species of calcareous sponge in the family Grantiidae.
