= Leucandra villosa =

Scientific classification
- Kingdom: Animalia
- Phylum: Porifera
- Class: Calcarea
- Order: Leucosolenida
- Family: Grantiidae
- Genus: Leucandra
- Species: L. villosa

Binomial name
- Leucandra villosa Lendenfeld, 1885

Species of sponge

Leucandra villosa is a species of calcareous sponge in the family Grantiidae. The sponge lives in the sea and its sclereid consists of calcium carbonate. The scientific name of the species was first published in 1885 by Lendenfeld.
