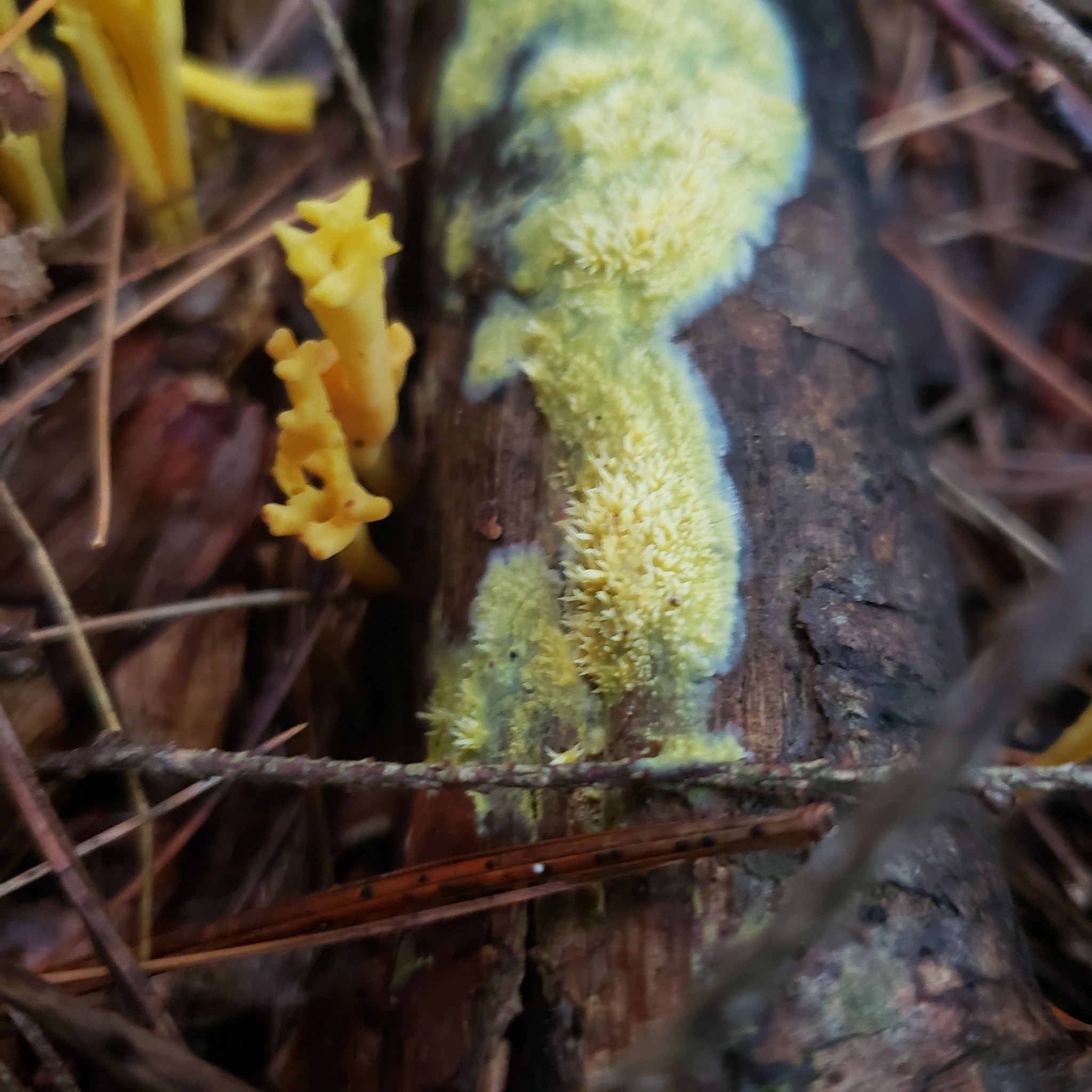
- Fruiting body of Sarcodontia uda

Scientific classification
- Kingdom: Fungi
- Division: Basidiomycota
- Class: Agaricomycetes
- Order: Polyporales
- Family: Meruliaceae
- Genus: Sarcodontia
- Species: S. uda

Binomial name
- Sarcodontia uda (Fr.) Spirin

= Sarcodontia uda =

Species of fungus

Sarcodontia uda is a species of crust fungus in the family Meruliaceae. It is commonly known as the yellow toothcrust due to its yellowish colour and toothed fertile surface.

== Description ==
Sarcodontia uda forms resupinate fruiting bodies that spread across wood surfaces. The fertile surface is yellow to orange-yellow and develops tooth-like or spiny projections with age. The fungus has a soft to somewhat waxy texture when fresh.

== Range ==
The species has been recorded from Europe, Asia, and North America.

== Habitat ==
It grows on decaying hardwood, especially old fruit trees such as apple and pear, where it causes wood decay.

== Ecology ==
Sarcodontia uda is a saprotrophic fungus that decomposes dead or weakened wood. It is associated with white rot in hardwood trees.

== Etymology ==
The genus name Sarcodontia refers to the fleshy tooth-like structures of the fungus, while the specific epithet uda originates from the original species description by Elias Magnus Fries.

== Taxonomy ==
The species was originally described by Elias Magnus Fries and later transferred to the genus Sarcodontia by mycologist Viacheslav Spirin.
