= Yoot =

Yoot may refer to:

- Yoot Saito (born 1962), Japanese computer game program designer
- Yut, a traditional board game played in Korea, sometimes romanized as 'yoot'

== See also ==
- Ute (disambiguation)
