= Leucandrilla =

Scientific classification
- Kingdom: Animalia
- Phylum: Porifera
- Class: Calcarea
- Order: Leucosolenida
- Family: Grantiidae
- Genus: Leucandrilla; Borojevic, Boury-Esnault & Vacelet, 2000

Genus of sponges

Leucandrilla is a genus of calcareous sponge belonging to the family Grantiidae.

Species:

- Leucandrilla connectens (Brøndsted, 1926)
- Leucandrilla fernandensis (Breitfuss, 1898)
- Leucandrilla intermedia (Row, 1909)
- Leucandrilla lanceolata (Row & Hôzawa, 1931)
- Leucandrilla ovata (Poléjaeff, 1883)
- Leucandrilla pallida (Row & Hôzawa, 1931)
- Leucandrilla quadriradiata Cóndor-Luján, Louzada, Hajdu & Klautau, 2018
- Leucandrilla thulakomorpha (Row & Hôzawa, 1931)
- Leucandrilla tropica (Tanita, 1943)
- Leucandrilla wasinensis (Jenkin, 1908)
