= Sphenella rostrata =

Scientific classification
- Kingdom: Animalia
- Phylum: Arthropoda
- Class: Insecta
- Order: Diptera
- Family: Tephritidae
- Subfamily: Tephritinae
- Tribe: Tephritini
- Genus: Sphenella
- Species: S. rostrata

Binomial name
- Sphenella rostrata Munro, 1957

Species of fly

Sphenella rostrata is a species of tephritid or fruit flies in the genus Sphenella of the family Tephritidae.

It is endemic to Lesotho.
