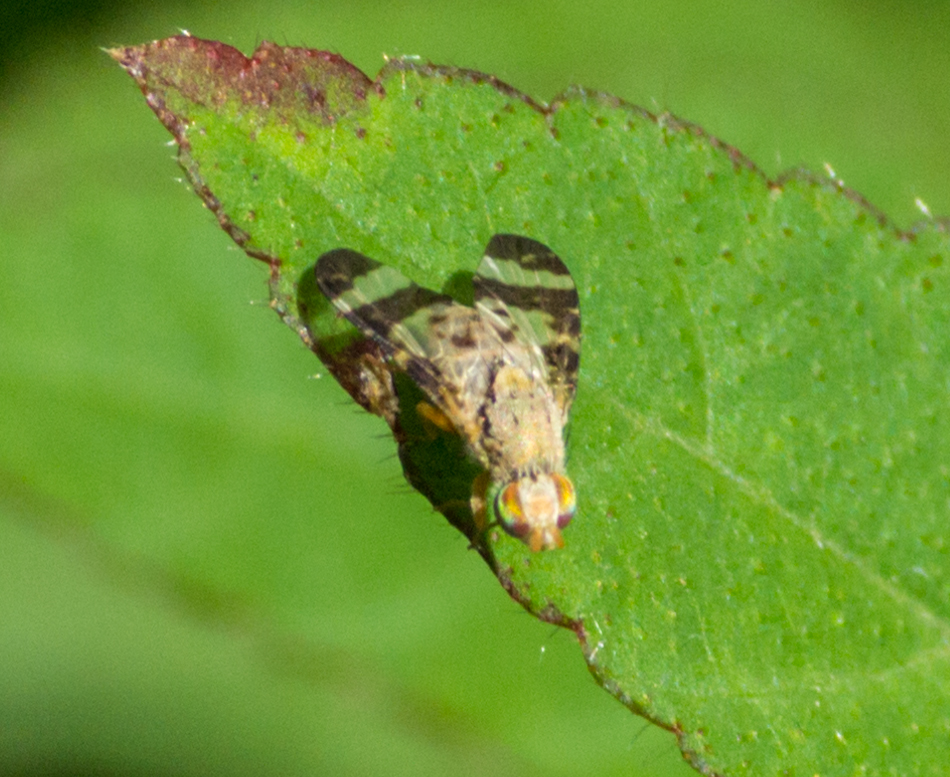
- S. sinensis, Indonesia

Scientific classification
- Kingdom: Animalia
- Phylum: Arthropoda
- Class: Insecta
- Order: Diptera
- Family: Tephritidae
- Subfamily: Tephritinae
- Tribe: Tephritini
- Genus: Sphenella; Robineau-Desvoidy, 1830

Type species
- Sphenella linariae Robineau-Desvoidy, 1830

Synonyms
- Sineura Hendel, 1927; Sinevra Lioy, 1864

= Sphenella =

Genus of flies

Sphenella is a genus of the family Tephritidae, better known as fruit flies.

== Species ==
- Sphenella atra Munro, 1957
- Sphenella aureliani Gheorghiu, 1985
- Sphenella crenata Munro, 1957
- Sphenella deletrix Munro, 1957
- Sphenella helianthoides (Bezzi, 1926)
- Sphenella hessei (Munro, 1929)
- Sphenella marginata (Fallén, 1814)
- Sphenella melanostigma Bezzi, 1908
- Sphenella nigricornis Bezzi, 1924
- Sphenella nigropilosa Meijere, 1914
- Sphenella novaguineensis Hardy, 1988
- Sphenella orbicula Munro, 1957
- Sphenella rostrata Munro, 1957
- Sphenella ruficeps (Macquart, 1851)
- Sphenella semisphenella (Bezzi, 1926)
- Sphenella setosa Merz & Dawah, 2005
- Sphenella sinensis Schiner, 1868
- Sphenella ypsilon Munro, 1933
