= Synute =

Scientific classification
- Kingdom: Animalia
- Phylum: Porifera
- Class: Calcarea
- Order: Leucosolenida
- Family: Grantiidae
- Genus: Synute; Dendy, 1892
- Species: S. pulchella

Binomial name
- Synute pulchella Dendy, 1892

Genus of sponges

Synute is a genus of calcareous sponge belonging to the family Grantiidae. The only species is Synute pulchella Dendy, 1892.
