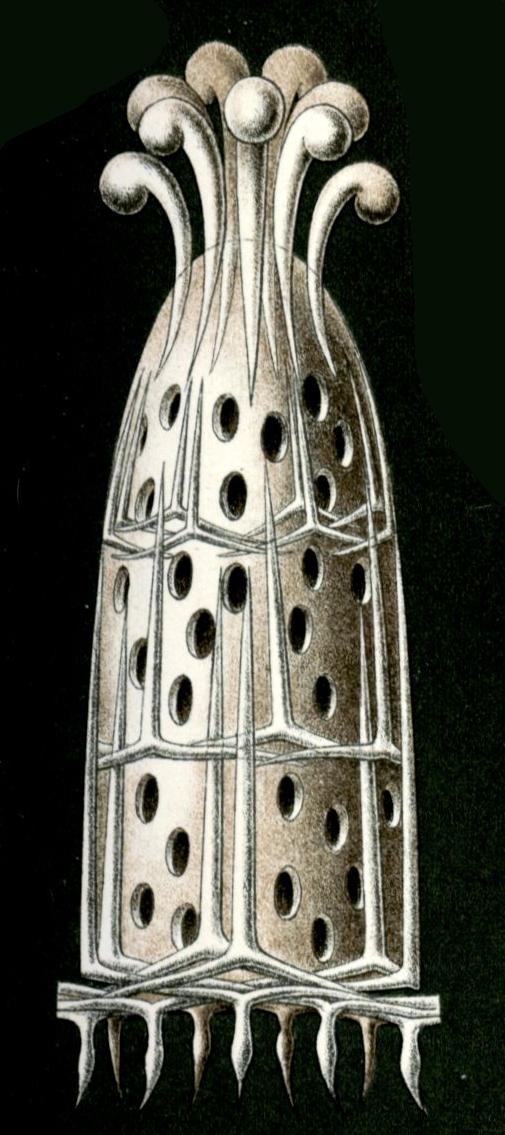
- Grantia compressa

Scientific classification
- Kingdom: Animalia
- Phylum: Porifera
- Class: Calcarea
- Order: Leucosolenida
- Family: Grantiidae
- Genus: Grantia; Fleming, 1828

Type species
- Spongia compressa Fabricius, 1780

Species
- See text

Synonyms
- Artynas Haeckel, 1872; Hozawaia de Laubenfels, 1936; Hypograntia Carter, 1886; Sphenophorina Breitfuss, 1898; Sycinula Schmidt, 1868; Sycophyllum Haeckel, 1870; Vosmaeria Lendenfeld, 1885, not Fristedt, 1885

= Grantia =

Genus of sponges

Grantia is a genus of calcareous sponges belonging to the family Grantiidae. Species of the genus Grantia contain spicules and spongin fibers.

The genus contains bioluminescent species.

== Species ==
- Grantia aculeata Urban, 1908
- Grantia arctica (Haeckel, 1872)
- Grantia asconoides (Breitfuss, 1896)
- Grantia atlantica Ridley, 1881
- Grantia beringiana Hôzawa, 1918
- Grantia breitfussi Van Soest, 2024
- Grantia canadensis Lambe, 1896
- Grantia capillosa (Schmidt, 1862)
- Grantia clavigera (Schmidt, 1869)
- Grantia comoxensis Lambe, 1893
- Grantia compressa (Fabricius, 1780)
- Grantia cupula (Haeckel, 1872)
- Grantia extusarticulata (Carter, 1886)
- Grantia fistulata Carter, 1886
- Grantia foliacea Breitfuss, 1898
- Grantia genuina Row & Hôzawa, 1931
- Grantia glabra Hôzawa, 1933
- Grantia harai Hôzawa, 1929
- Grantia hirsuta (Topsent, 1907)
- Grantia indica Dendy, 1913
- Grantia infrequens (Carter, 1886)
- Grantia intermedia Thacker, 1908
- Grantia invenusta Lambe, 1900
- Grantia kempfi Borojevic & Peixinho, 1976
- Grantia kujiensis Hôzawa, 1933
- Grantia laevigata (Haeckel, 1872)
- Grantia mexico Hôzawa, 1940
- Grantia mirabilis (Fristedt, 1887)
- Grantia monstruosa Breitfuss, 1898
- Grantia nipponica Hôzawa, 1918
- Grantia phillipsi Lambe, 1900
- Grantia primitiva Brøndsted, 1927
- Grantia ramulosa Dendy, 1924
- Grantia singularis (Breitfuss, 1898)
- Grantia socialis Borojevic, 1967
- Grantia strobilus (Haeckel, 1872)
- Grantia stylata Hôzawa, 1929
- Grantia tenuis Urban, 1908
- Grantia transgrediens Brøndsted, 1931
- Grantia tuberosa Poléjaeff, 1883
- Grantia uchidai Hôzawa & Tanita, 1941
- Grantia vosmaeri Dendy, 1893
