= Sphenella novaguineensis =

Scientific classification
- Kingdom: Animalia
- Phylum: Arthropoda
- Class: Insecta
- Order: Diptera
- Family: Tephritidae
- Subfamily: Tephritinae
- Tribe: Tephritini
- Genus: Sphenella
- Species: S. novaguineensis

Binomial name
- Sphenella novaguineensis Hardy, 1988

Species of fly

Sphenella novaguineensis is a species of tephritid or fruit fly in the genus Sphenella of the family Tephritidae.

== Distribution ==
New Guinea, New Britain.
