= Anastoechus leucothrix =

Scientific classification
- Kingdom: Animalia
- Phylum: Arthropoda
- Class: Insecta
- Order: Diptera
- Family: Bombyliidae
- Tribe: Bombyliini
- Genus: Anastoechus
- Species: A. leucothrix

Binomial name
- Anastoechus leucothrix Hall & Evenhuis, 1981

Species of fly

Anastoechus leucothrix is a species of bee flies (insects in the family Bombyliidae).

These flies usually feed on nectar and pollen from flowers.
