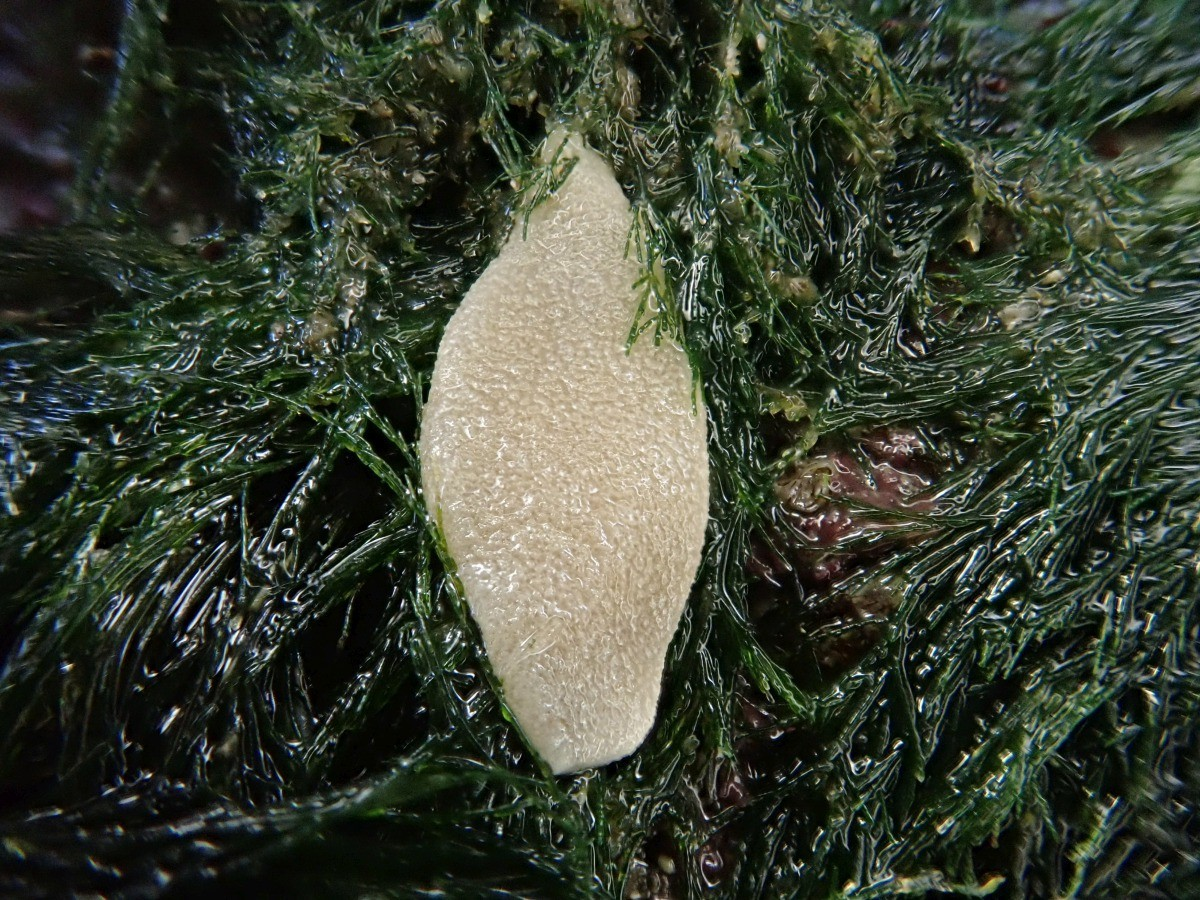

Scientific classification
- Kingdom: Animalia
- Phylum: Porifera
- Class: Calcarea
- Order: Leucosolenida
- Family: Grantiidae
- Genus: Grantia
- Species: G. compressa

Binomial name
- Grantia compressa O. Fabricius, 1780

= Grantia compressa =

Species of sponge

Grantia compressa is a species of calcareous sponge belonging to the family Grantiidae. It is a very common species of rocky shores along the Atlantic coasts of Europe from France northwards.

It appears as flattened, purse-shaped vases up to 5 cm long with slit-like oscula at the ends, hanging downwards attached by a stalk to rocky overhangs, often in groups among seaweed. This is a pale sponge ranging in color from grey to yellow. The body of sponge looks like a branching tree with slender. Vaselike cylinder of 5to6 mm in diameter. The entire body of the sponge is pierced by numerous holes, the inhalent pores or ostia. The free end of each cylinder communicates outside by large osculum. The osculum is encircled by oscular fringe. Asexual reproduction by regeneration and budding. Development Is indirect with free swimming amphiblastula larva
