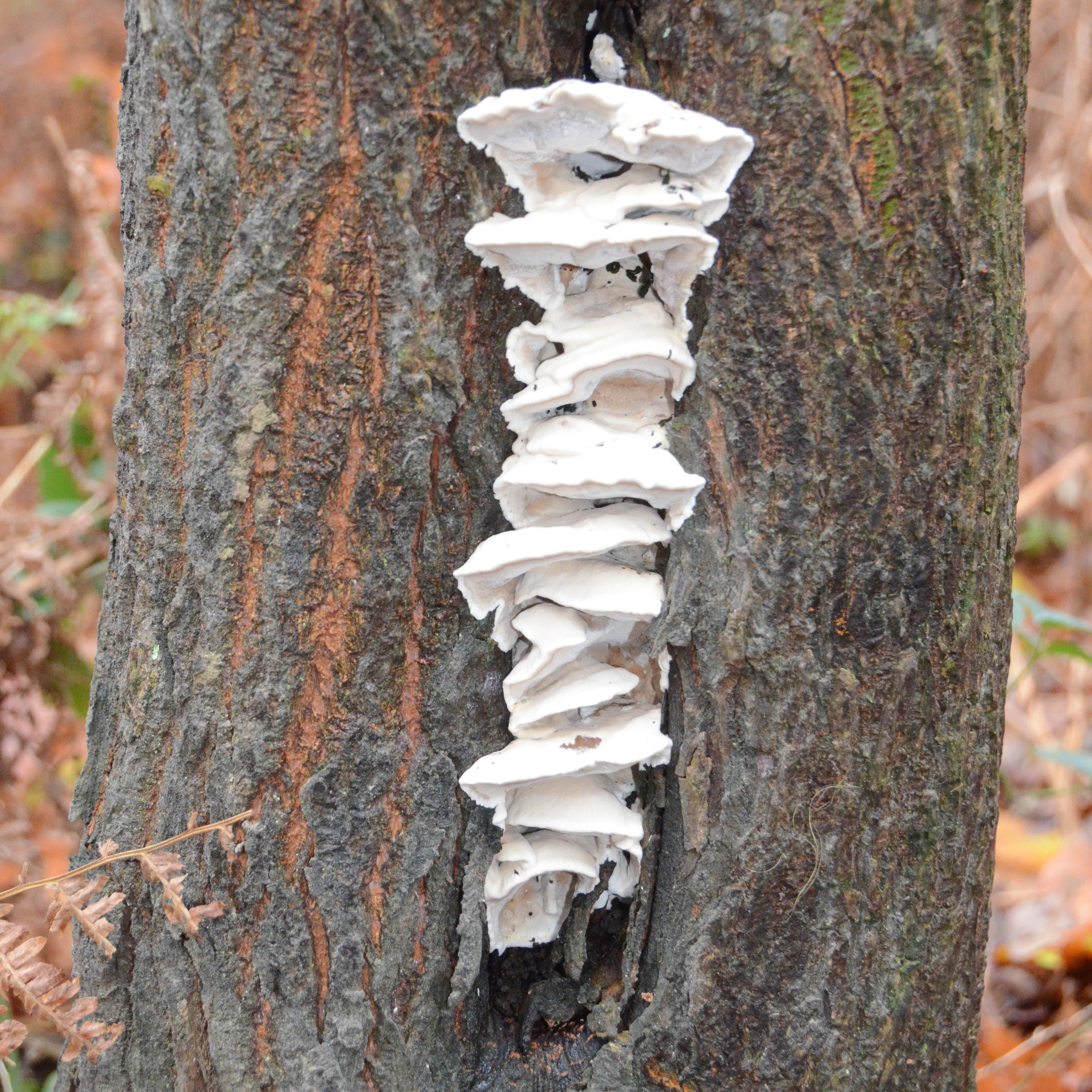

Scientific classification
- Domain: Eukaryota
- Kingdom: Fungi
- Division: Basidiomycota
- Class: Agaricomycetes
- Order: Polyporales
- Family: Meruliaceae
- Genus: Sarcodontia
- Species: S. spumea

Binomial name
- Sarcodontia spumea (Sowerby) Spirin (2001)

Synonyms
- Boletus spumeus Sowerby (1799); Polyporus spumeus (Sowerby) Fr. (1821); Bjerkandera spumea (Sowerby) P.Karst. (1882); Inodermus spumeus (Sowerby) Quél. (1886); Spongipellis spumeus (Sowerby) Pat. (1900); Polystictus spumeus (Sowerby) Bigeard & H.Guill. (1913); Leptoporus spumeus (Sowerby) Pilát (1938); Tyromyces spumeus (Sowerby) Imazeki (1943); Spongipellis spumeus var. mongolicus Murashk.; Spongipellis occidentalis Murrill (1907); Polyporus occidentalis (Murrill) Sacc. & Trotter (1912); Polyporus foetidus Velen. (1927); Leptoporus foetidus (Velen.) Pilát (1938); Spongipellis foetidus (Velen.) Kotl. & Pouzar (1965)

= Sarcodontia spumea =

Species of fungus

Sarcodontia spumea is a species of tooth fungus in the family Meruliaceae. It is widespread in Europe, where it causes a white rot of both living and dead hardwood trees, especially maples. The fungus was originally described by English botanist James Sowerby in 1799. After having been moved to several different genera in its taxonomic history, Viacheslav Spirin transferred it to the genus Sarcodontia in 2001.
