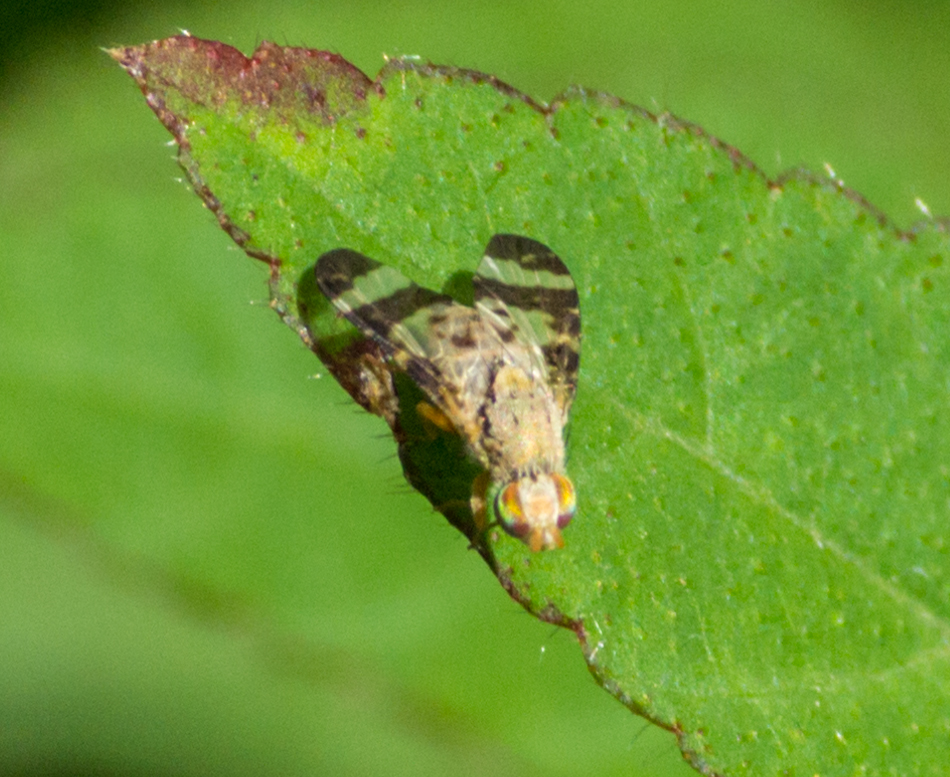
- Sphenella sinensis, Indonesia

Scientific classification
- Kingdom: Animalia
- Phylum: Arthropoda
- Class: Insecta
- Order: Diptera
- Family: Tephritidae
- Subfamily: Tephritinae
- Tribe: Tephritini
- Genus: Sphenella
- Species: S. sinensis

Binomial name
- Sphenella sinensis Schiner, 1868

= Sphenella sinensis =

Species of fly

Sphenella sinensis is a species of tephritid or fruit flies in the genus Sphenella of the family Tephritidae.

== Distribution ==
India, China & Japan to New Guinea.
