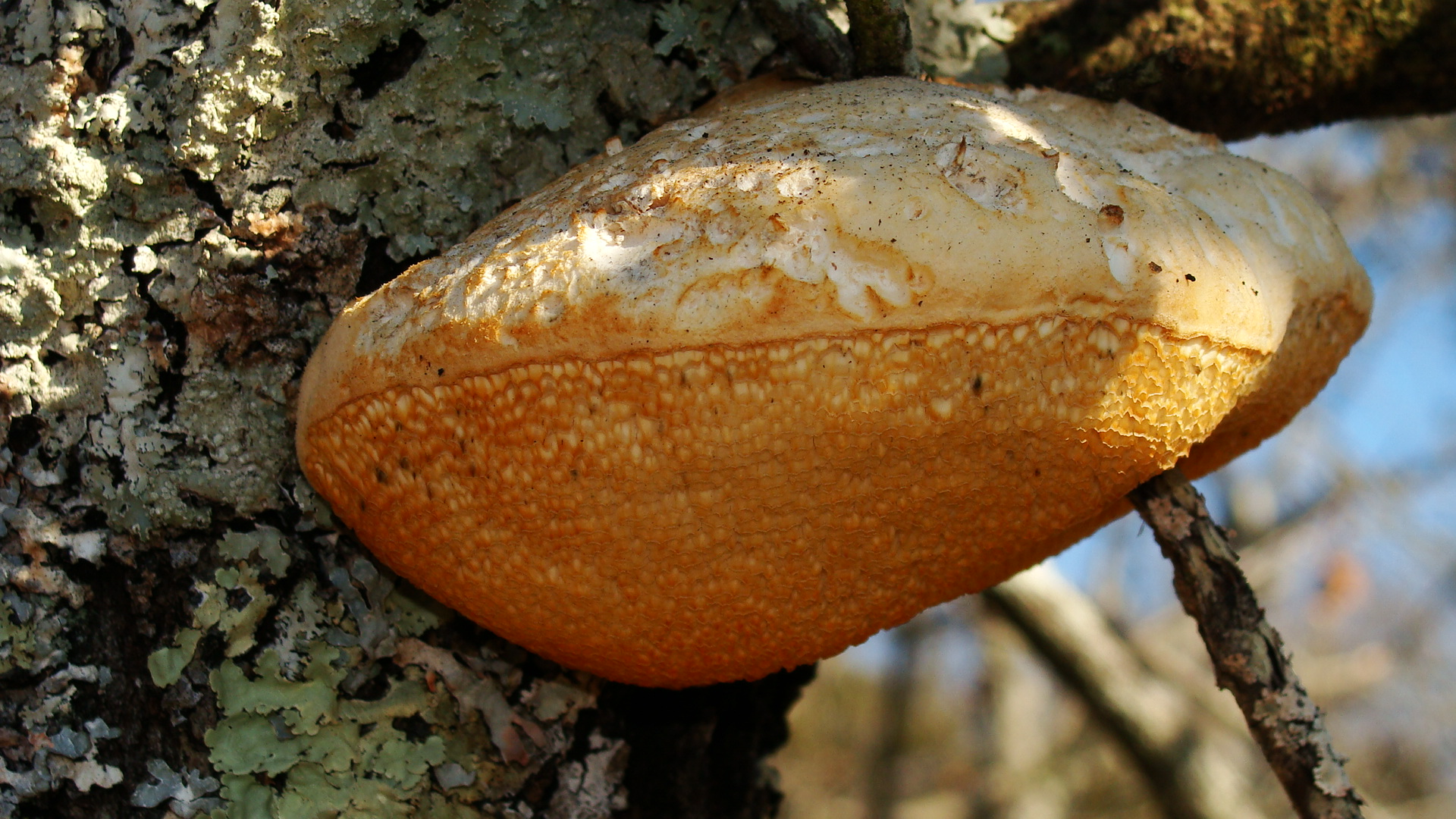

Scientific classification
- Domain: Eukaryota
- Kingdom: Fungi
- Division: Basidiomycota
- Class: Agaricomycetes
- Order: Polyporales
- Family: Meruliaceae
- Genus: Sarcodontia
- Species: S. unicolor

Binomial name
- Sarcodontia unicolor (Fr.) Zmitr. & Spirin (2006)

Synonyms
- List: Boletus unicolor Schwein. (1822); Polyporus unicolor Fr. (1838); Polyporus obtusus Berk. (1839); Inonotus unicolor (Fr.) P. Karst. (1879); Trametes unicolor (Fr.) Murrill (1905); Spongipellis unicolor (Fr.) Murrill (1907); Daedalea obtusa (Berk.) J. Neuman (1914); Tyromyces unicolor (Fr.) J. Lowe (1975); Somion unicolor (Fr.) Zmitr. & Spirin (2023)

= Sarcodontia unicolor =

Species of fungus

Sarcodontia unicolor is a species of polypore fungus in the family Meruliaceae. It is a plant pathogen that affects oak trees. The fungal hyphae grow inside the tree, rotting the heartwood. The fruit bodies are initially whitish to buff in color before turning brownish in age. The pores on the underside of the cap are circular to angular. Spores are held in tubes and are ovoid to ellipsoid, with dimensions of 7–9 by 6–7 μm.
