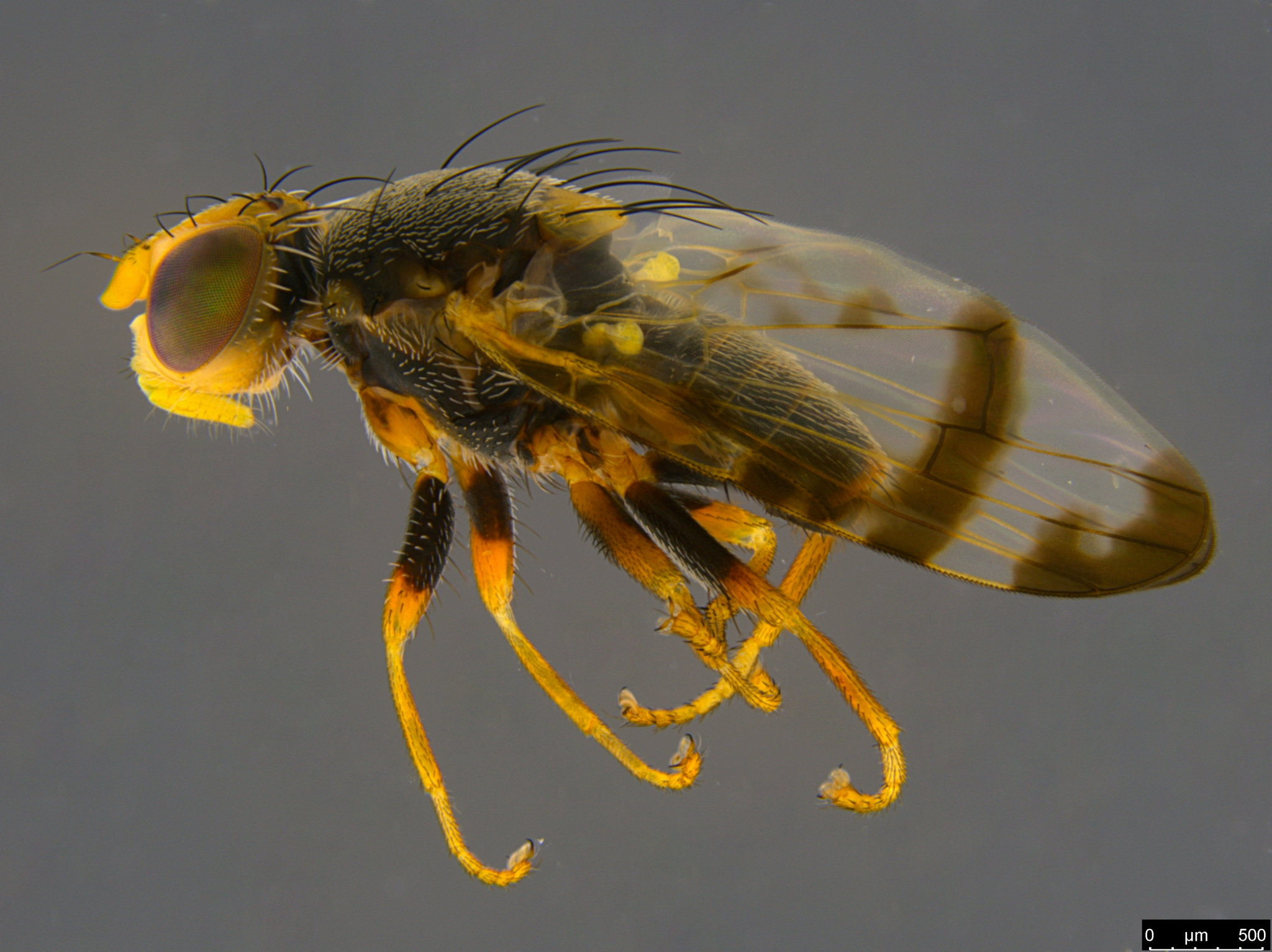

Scientific classification
- Kingdom: Animalia
- Phylum: Arthropoda
- Clade: Pancrustacea
- Class: Insecta
- Order: Diptera
- Family: Tephritidae
- Subfamily: Tephritinae
- Tribe: Tephritini
- Genus: Sphenella
- Species: S. ruficeps

Binomial name
- Sphenella ruficeps (Macquart, 1851)

Synonyms
- Urophora ruficeps Macquart, 1851

= Sphenella ruficeps =

Species of fly

Sphenella ruficeps is a species of tephritid or fruit flies in the genus Sphenella of the family Tephritidae.

== Distribution ==
Australia.
