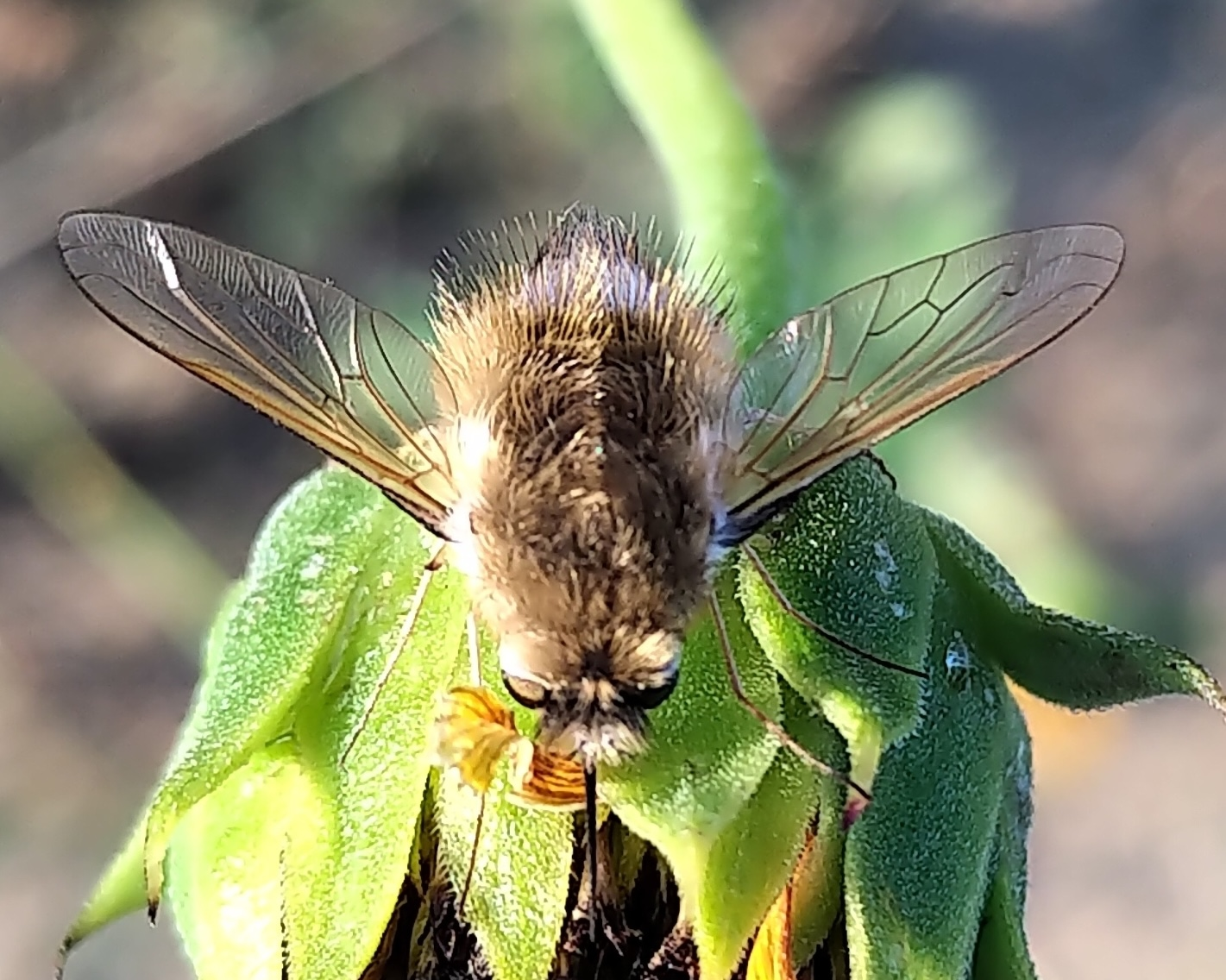

Scientific classification
- Kingdom: Animalia
- Phylum: Arthropoda
- Class: Insecta
- Order: Diptera
- Family: Bombyliidae
- Tribe: Bombyliini
- Genus: Anastoechus
- Species: A. barbatus

Binomial name
- Anastoechus barbatus Osten Sacken, 1877

= Anastoechus barbatus =

Species of fly

Anastoechus barbatus is a species of bee fly in the family Bombyliidae. It is found in Canada from the Yukon east to Ontario, and across most of the United States from Massachusetts west to California and Texas, but is absent from the southeast. Its larvae are predators of grasshopper eggs.
