= Utes =

Utes may refer to:

- Ute people, indigenous people of North America
- Students of the University of Utah
- Utah Utes, athletics team of the University of Utah
- Útes, fictional island in the video game ARMA 2
- Underground thermal energy storage (UTES)

== See also ==
- Ute (disambiguation)
