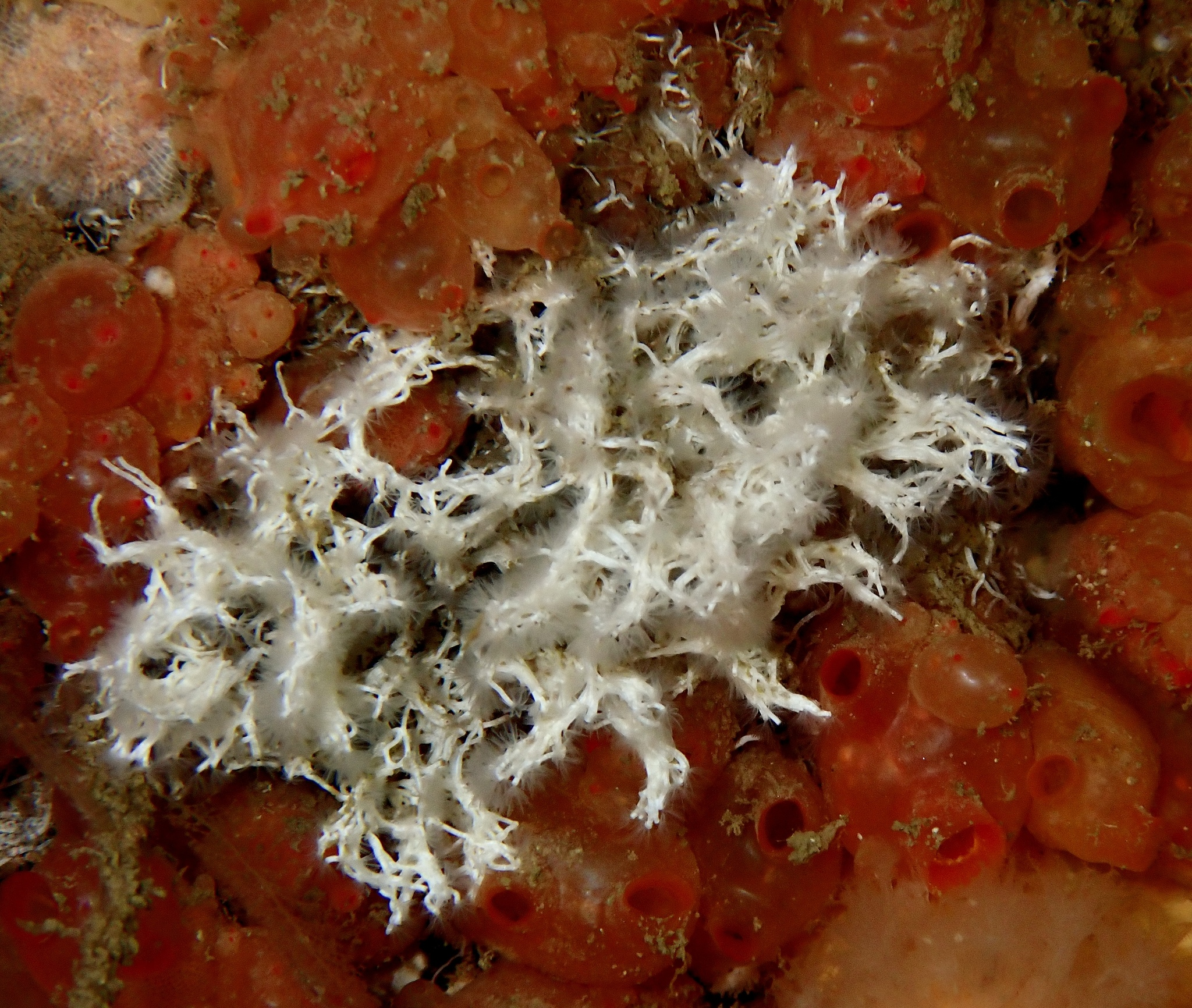

Scientific classification
- Kingdom: Animalia
- Phylum: Annelida
- Clade: Pleistoannelida
- Clade: Sedentaria
- Order: Sabellida
- Family: Serpulidae
- Genus: Salmacina
- Species: S. dysteri

Binomial name
- Salmacina dysteri (Huxley, 1855)

Synonyms
- Filograna dysteri (Huxley, 1855); Filopora filograna Dalyell, 1853; Protula (Salmacina) dysteri Huxley, 1855; Protula dysteri Huxley, 1855; Salmacina aedificatrix Claparède, 1870; Salmacina edificatrix Claparède, 1870

= Salmacina dysteri =

Species of annelid worm

Salmacina dysteri is a species of tube-forming annelid worm in the family Serpulidae. It is found on submerged rocks, reefs, piles and boats in many shallow and deeper water environments around the world.

== Description ==
Salmacina dysteri lives in a slender white tube that it constructs, which is up to 15 mm (0.6 in) long and 5 mm (0.2 in) wide. It is a gregarious species and forms agglomerations of intertwined tubes. The branchial crown, which projects from the end of the tube, has two groups of four radioles (heavily ciliated, feather-like tentacles). This worm has seven to nine thoracic segments and the tube has no operculum (lid). Unlike the two-layer tubes of many related species, the opaque tube of Salmacina dysteri consists of a single, porous layer.

== Distribution and habitat ==
It is not clear where this species originated, but it is now found in warm waters globally. It was first seen in Hawaii in 1939, and it occurs there from the eulittoral zone down to around 600 m (2,000 ft). It grows on solid structures such as on rocks, on seaweed on reef flats, on reef slopes and docks, especially in harbours and bays; it also grows on the hulls of ships and on top of other fouling organisms.

== Ecology ==
Salmacina dysteri is a suspension feeder. Cilia on the tentacles cause currents in the water and small organic particles are caught as they float by. Other cilia move the particles along mucus-filled grooves to the mouth. Experiments have shown that only inert, detrital particles are captured by the expanded crown, free-swimming algae being able to avoid entrapment.

This worm is a hermaphrodite; reproduction can occur asexually, when the body breaks into two parts, or sexually, by the emission of gametes into the water column.
