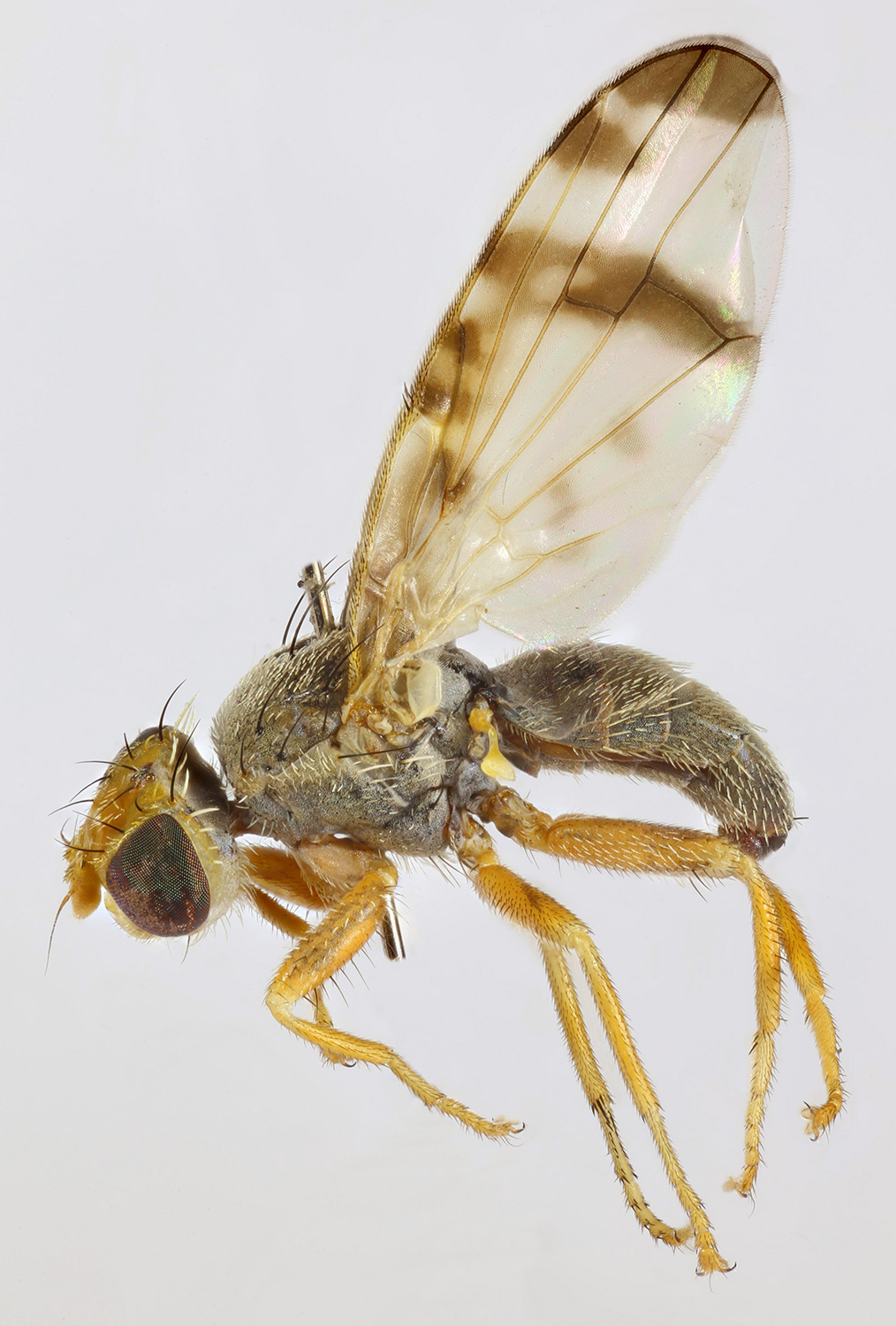
- Sphenella marginata North Wales

Scientific classification
- Kingdom: Animalia
- Phylum: Arthropoda
- Class: Insecta
- Order: Diptera
- Family: Tephritidae
- Subfamily: Tephritinae
- Tribe: Tephritini
- Genus: Sphenella
- Species: S. marginata

Binomial name
- Sphenella marginata (Fallén, 1814)

Synonyms
- Tephritis tenerifensis Bigot, 1891; Tephritis teneriffensis Hendel, 1927; Acinia miranda Wollaston, 1858; Sphenella linariae Robineau-Desvoidy, 1830

= Sphenella marginata =

Species of fly

Sphenella marginata is a species of fly in the family Tephritidae, the gall flies. It is found in the Palearctic. The larvae feed on Senecio vulgaris.
