= Sycute =

Scientific classification
- Kingdom: Animalia
- Phylum: Porifera
- Class: Calcarea
- Order: Leucosolenida
- Family: Grantiidae
- Genus: Sycute; Dendy & Row, 1913
- Species: S. dendyi

Binomial name
- Sycute dendyi (Kirk, 1895)

Genus of sponges

Sycute is a genus of calcareous sponge belonging to the family Grantiidae. The only species is Sycute dendyi (Kirk, 1895).
