= Leucettaga =

Scientific classification
- Kingdom: Animalia
- Phylum: Porifera
- Class: Calcarea
- Order: Leucosolenida
- Family: Grantiidae
- Genus: Leucettaga; Haeckel, 1872
- Species: L. loculifera

Binomial name
- Leucettaga loculifera (Haeckel, 1872)

Genus of sponges

Leucettaga is a genus of calcareous sponge belonging to the family Grantiidae. The only species is Leucettaga loculifera (Haeckel, 1872).
