= Amphiute =

Scientific classification
- Domain: Eukaryota
- Kingdom: Animalia
- Phylum: Porifera
- Class: Calcarea
- Order: Leucosolenida
- Family: Grantiidae
- Genus: Amphiute; Hanitsch, 1894

Species
- Amphiute lepadiformis; Amphiute paulini

Genus of sponges

Amphiute is a genus of calcareous sponges belonging to the family Grantiidae.
