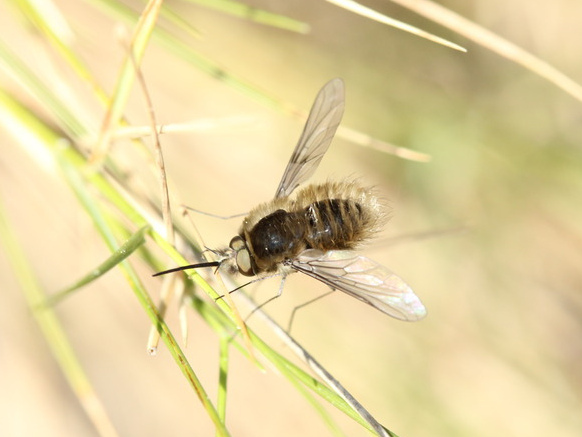
- Anastoechus nitidulus

Scientific classification
- Domain: Eukaryota
- Kingdom: Animalia
- Phylum: Arthropoda
- Class: Insecta
- Order: Diptera
- Family: Bombyliidae
- Subfamily: Bombyliinae
- Tribe: Bombyliini
- Genus: Anastoechus; Osten Sacken, 1877

= Anastoechus =

Genus of flies

Anastoechus is a genus of bee flies (insects in the family Bombyliidae). There are at least 90 described species in Anastoechus.

== Species ==
These 90 species belong to the genus Anastoechus:

- Anastoechus aberrans Paramonov, 1940^{c g}
- Anastoechus aegyptiacus Paramonov, 1930^{c g}
- Anastoechus airis Greathead, 1970^{c g}
- Anastoechus andalusiacus Paramonov, 1930^{c g}
- Anastoechus angustifrons Paramonov, 1930^{c g}
- Anastoechus anomalus Paramonov, 1940^{c g}
- Anastoechus araxis Paramonov, 1926^{c g}
- Anastoechus argyrocomus Hesse, 1938^{c g}
- Anastoechus asiaticus Becker, 1916^{c g}
- Anastoechus aurecrinitus Du & Yang, 1991^{c g}
- Anastoechus aurifrons Efflatoun, 1945^{c g}
- Anastoechus bahirae Becker, 1915^{c g}
- Anastoechus baigakumensis Paramonov, 1926^{c g}
- Anastoechus bangalorensis Kapoor & Agarwal, 1978^{c g}
- Anastoechus barbatus Osten Sacken, 1877^{i c g b}
- Anastoechus bitinctus Becker, 1916^{c g}
- Anastoechus candidus^{g}
- Anastoechus caucasicus Paramonov, 1930^{c g}
- Anastoechus chakanus Du & al., 2008^{g}
- Anastoechus chinensis Paramonov, 1930^{c g}
- Anastoechus deserticolus Hesse, 1938^{c g}
- Anastoechus dolosus Hesse, 1938^{c g}
- Anastoechus doulananus Du & al., 2008^{g}
- Anastoechus elegans Paramonov, 1930^{c g}
- Anastoechus erinaceus Bezzi, 1921^{c g}
- Anastoechus exalbidus (Wiedemann, 1820)^{c g}
- Anastoechus firjuzanus Paramonov, 1930^{c g}
- Anastoechus flaveolus Becker, 1916^{c g}
- Anastoechus flavosericatus Hesse, 1938^{c g}
- Anastoechus fulvescens Becker & Stein, 1913^{c g}
- Anastoechus fulvus^{g}
- Anastoechus fuscianulatus Hesse, 1938^{c g}
- Anastoechus fuscus Paramonov, 1926^{c g}
- Anastoechus hessei Hall, 1958^{i c g b}
- Anastoechus hummeli Paramonov, 1933^{c g}
- Anastoechus hyrcanus (Pallas & Wiedemann, 1818)^{c g}
- Anastoechus innocuus Bezzi, 1921^{c g}
- Anastoechus kashmirensis Zaitzev, 1988^{c g}
- Anastoechus latifrons (Macquart, 1839)^{c g}
- Anastoechus leucosoma Bezzi, 1921^{c g}
- Anastoechus leucothrix Hall & Evenhuis, 1981^{i c g b}
- Anastoechus longirostris van-der van der Wulp, 1885^{c}
- Anastoechus longirostris Wulp, 1885^{g}
- Anastoechus macrophthalmus Bezzi, 1921^{c g}
- Anastoechus macrorrhynchus Bezzi, 1924^{c g}
- Anastoechus melanohalteralis Tucker, 1907^{i c g b}
- Anastoechus mellinus Francois, 1969^{c g}
- Anastoechus meridionalis Bezzi, 1912^{c g}
- Anastoechus miscens (Walker, 1871)^{c g}
- Anastoechus mongolicus Paramonov, 1930^{c g}
- Anastoechus monticola Paramonov, 1930^{c g}
- Anastoechus montium Becker, 1916^{c g}
- Anastoechus mylabricida Zakhvatkin, 1934^{c g}
- Anastoechus neimongolanus Du, 1991^{c g}
- Anastoechus nigricirratus Becker & Stein, 1913^{c g}
- Anastoechus nitens Hesse, 1938^{c g}
- Anastoechus nitidulus (Fabricius, 1794)^{c g}
- Anastoechus niveicollis Enderlein, 1934^{c g}
- Anastoechus nividulus Evenhuis & Greathead, 1999^{c g}
- Anastoechus nivifrons (Walker, 1871)^{c g}
- Anastoechus nivosus Greathead, 1996^{c g}
- Anastoechus nomas Paramonov, 1930^{c g}
- Anastoechus olivaceus Paramonov, 1930^{c g}
- Anastoechus phaleratus Hesse, 1938^{c g}
- Anastoechus pruinosus Hesse, 1938^{c g}
- Anastoechus pulcher Paramonov, 1930^{c g}
- Anastoechus ravus Greathead, 1970^{c g}
- Anastoechus retardatus Becker & Stein, 1913^{c g}
- Anastoechus rubicundus Bezzi, 1924^{c g}
- Anastoechus rubricosus (Wiedemann, 1821)^{c g}
- Anastoechus rubriventris Paramonov, 1930^{c g}
- Anastoechus setosus (Loew, 1855)^{c g}
- Anastoechus sibiricus Becker, 1916^{c g}
- Anastoechus smirnovi Paramonov, 1926^{c g}
- Anastoechus spinifacies Bezzi, 1924^{c g}
- Anastoechus stackelbergi Paramonov, 1926^{c g}
- Anastoechus stramineus (Wiedemann, 1820)^{c g}
- Anastoechus subviridis Greathead, 1996^{c g}
- Anastoechus suzukii Matsumura, 1916^{c g}
- Anastoechus syrdarjensis Paramonov, 1926^{c g}
- Anastoechus trisignatus (Portschinsky, 1881)^{c g}
- Anastoechus turanicus Paramonov, 1926^{c g}
- Anastoechus turkestanicus Paramonov, 1926^{c g}
- Anastoechus turkmenorum Paramonov, 1930^{c g}
- Anastoechus turriformis^{g}
- Anastoechus varipecten Bezzi, 1921^{c g}
- Anastoechus vlasovi Paramonov, 1930^{c g}
- Anastoechus xaralicus Paramonov, 1940^{c g}
- Anastoechus xuthus^{g}
- Anastoechus zimini Paramonov, 1940^{c g}

Data sources: i = ITIS, c = Catalogue of Life, g = GBIF, b = Bugguide.net
