= Teichonopsis =

Scientific classification
- Kingdom: Animalia
- Phylum: Porifera
- Class: Calcarea
- Order: Leucosolenida
- Family: Grantiidae
- Genus: Teichonopsis; Dendy & Row, 1913
- Species: T. labyrinthica

Binomial name
- Teichonopsis labyrinthica (Carter, 1878)

Genus of sponges

Teichonopsis is a genus of calcareous sponge belonging to the family Grantiidae. The only species is Teichonopsis labyrinthica (Carter, 1878).
