= Sphenella nigricornis =

Scientific classification
- Kingdom: Animalia
- Phylum: Arthropoda
- Class: Insecta
- Order: Diptera
- Family: Tephritidae
- Subfamily: Tephritinae
- Tribe: Tephritini
- Genus: Sphenella
- Species: S. nigricornis

Binomial name
- Sphenella nigricornis Bezzi, 1924

Species of fly

Sphenella nigricornis is a species of tephritid or fruit flies in the genus Sphenella of the family Tephritidae.

== Distribution ==
Namibia, Lesotho, South Africa.
