= Sycodorus =

Scientific classification
- Kingdom: Animalia
- Phylum: Porifera
- Class: Calcarea
- Order: Leucosolenida
- Family: Grantiidae
- Genus: Sycodorus; Haeckel, 1872
- Species: S. hystrix

Binomial name
- Sycodorus hystrix Haeckel, 1872

Genus of sponges

Sycodorus is a genus of calcareous sponge belonging to the family Grantiidae. The only species is Sycodorus hystrix Haeckel, 1872.
