= Aphroceras =

Scientific classification
- Kingdom: Animalia
- Phylum: Porifera
- Class: Calcarea
- Order: Leucosolenida
- Family: Grantiidae
- Genus: Aphroceras; Gray, 1858

Species
- Aphroceras alcicornis; Aphroceras caespitosa; Aphroceras caminus; Aphroceras cataphracta; Aphroceras cladocora; Aphroceras corticata; Aphroceras elongata; Aphroceras ensata

Synonyms
- Cyathiscus Haeckel, 1870

Genus of sponges

Aphroceras is a genus of calcareous sponges belonging to the family Grantiidae.
