= Paragrantia =

Scientific classification
- Domain: Eukaryota
- Kingdom: Animalia
- Phylum: Porifera
- Class: Calcarea
- Order: Leucosolenida
- Family: Grantiidae
- Genus: Paragrantia; Hôzawa, 1940
- Species: P. waguensis

Binomial name
- Paragrantia waguensis Hôzawa, 1940

Genus of sponges

Paragrantia is a genus of calcareous sponge belonging to the family Grantiidae. The only species is Paragrantia waguensis Hôzawa, 1940.
