= Ute =

Ute or UTE may refer to:

- The Ute people, a Native American people of the Great Basin
  - Ute Indian Tribe of the Uintah and Ouray Reservation, Utah
  - Ute Mountain Ute Tribe, Colorado, New Mexico, and Utah
  - Southern Ute Indian Tribe of the Southern Ute Reservation, Colorado
  - Ute dialect, a Colorado River Numic language spoken by the Ute
- Ute (vehicle), an Australian and New Zealand term for certain utility vehicles
  - Holden Ute, an Australian coupe utility

== Place names ==
In the United States:

- Ute, Iowa, a city in Monona County along the Soldier River
- Ute Mountain, Colorado
- Ute Mountain, New Mexico
- Ute Pass, a mountain pass west of Colorado Springs

In other places:

- 634 Ute, a minor planet orbiting the Sun

== Other uses ==
- Beechcraft U-21 Ute, an American military utility aircraft
- Ute (band), an Australian jazz group
- Ute (given name)
- Ute (sponge), a sponge genus
- Utah Utes, the University of Utah athletic teams
- UTE (Usinas y Terminales Eléctricas), Uruguay's government-owned power company
- Újpesti TE, a Hungarian sports society
- UTE TV 11, a proposed Chilean television channel

== See also ==
- Utes (disambiguation)
