= Sphenella nigropilosa =

Scientific classification
- Kingdom: Animalia
- Phylum: Arthropoda
- Class: Insecta
- Order: Diptera
- Family: Tephritidae
- Subfamily: Tephritinae
- Tribe: Tephritini
- Genus: Sphenella
- Species: S. nigropilosa

Binomial name
- Sphenella nigropilosa Meijere, 1914

Species of fly

Sphenella nigropilosa is a species of tephritid or fruit flies in the genus Sphenella of the family Tephritidae.

== Distribution ==
Indonesia.
