= Anastoechus melanohalteralis =

Scientific classification
- Domain: Eukaryota
- Kingdom: Animalia
- Phylum: Arthropoda
- Class: Insecta
- Order: Diptera
- Family: Bombyliidae
- Tribe: Bombyliini
- Genus: Anastoechus
- Species: A. melanohalteralis

Binomial name
- Anastoechus melanohalteralis Tucker, 1907

Synonyms
- Anastoechus fulvipennis Tucker, 1907

Species of fly

Anastoechus melanohalteralis is a species of bee fly in the family Bombyliidae. It is found in Alberta, Canada, and across the western and central United States. Its larvae are predators of grasshopper eggs.
