= Sycandra =

Scientific classification
- Kingdom: Animalia
- Phylum: Porifera
- Class: Calcarea
- Order: Leucosolenida
- Family: Grantiidae
- Genus: Sycandra; Haeckel, 1872

Genus of sponges

Sycandra is a genus of calcareous sponge belonging to the family Grantiidae.

Species:

- Sycandra rappi Morozov, 2024
- Sycandra utriculus (Schmidt, 1869)
