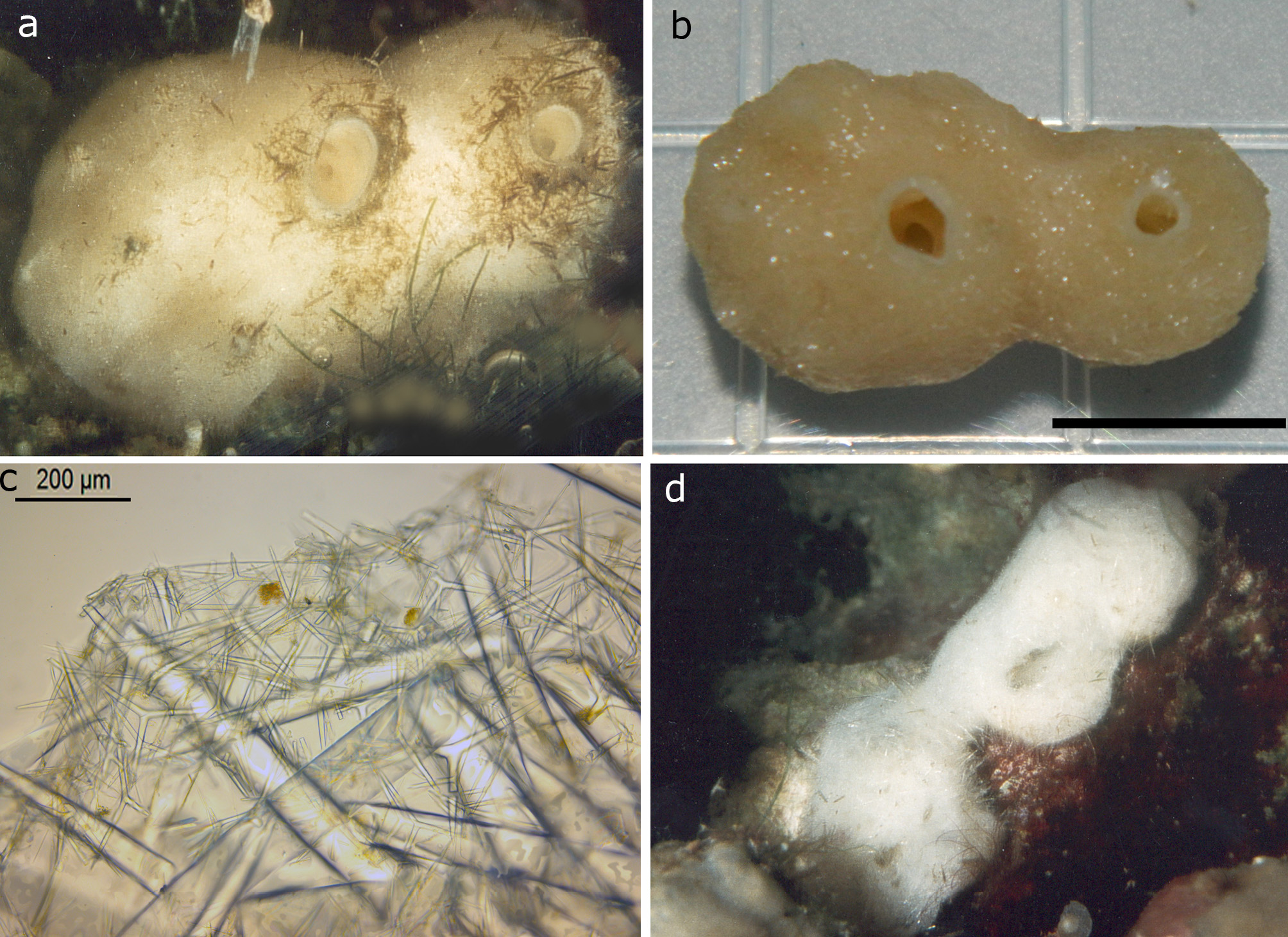
- Leucandra pulvinar

Scientific classification
- Domain: Eukaryota
- Kingdom: Animalia
- Phylum: Porifera
- Class: Calcarea
- Order: Leucosolenida
- Family: Grantiidae
- Genus: Leucandra; Haeckel, 1872

Species
- See text

Synonyms
- Dyssycum Haeckel, 1870; Leucogypsia Bowerbank, 1862; Leucortis Haeckel, 1872; Medon Duchassaing & Michelotti, 1864; Mlea Haeckel, 1872

= Leucandra (sponge) =

Leucandra Temporal range: Toarcian–Recent

Genus of sponges

Leucandra is a genus of calcareous sponge belonging to the family Grantiidae. Its earliest known fossils are from the Jurassic.

== Species ==
- Leucandra abratsbo Hozawa, 1929
- Leucandra algoaensis (Bowerbank, 1864)
- Leucandra amakusana Tanita, 1943
- Leucandra amorpha Poléjaeff, 1883
- Leucandra ananas (Montagu, 1814)
- Leucandra anfracta (Urban, 1908)
- Leucandra anguinea (Ridley, 1884)
- Leucandra apicalis Urban, 1906
- Leucandra armata (Urban, 1908)
- Leucandra aspera (Schmidt, 1862)
- Leucandra astricta Tanita, 1942
- Leucandra australiensis (Carter, 1886)
- Leucandra balearica Lackschewitz, 1886
- Leucandra barbata (Duchassaing & Michelotti, 1864)
- Leucandra bathybia (Haeckel, 1869)
- Leucandra belemnifera (Tsurnamal, 1975)
- Leucandra bleeki (Haeckel, 1872)
- Leucandra bolivari Ferrer-Hernandez, 1916
- Leucandra brumalis Jenkin, 1908
- Leucandra bulbosa Hanitsch, 1895
- Leucandra caminus Haeckel, 1872
- Leucandra capillata (Poléjaeff, 1883)
- Leucandra caribea Cóndor-Luján, Louzada, Hajdu & Klautau, 2018
- Leucandra cerebrum Hozawa & Tanita, 1941
- Leucandra cirrhosa (Urban, 1908)
- Leucandra claviformis Schuffner, 1877
- Leucandra coimbrae (Breitfuss, 1898)
- Leucandra comata Brøndsted, 1931
- Leucandra compacta (Carter, 1886)
- Leucandra conica Lendenfeld, 1885
- Leucandra connectens Brøndsted, 1927
- Leucandra consolida Tanita, 1943
- Leucandra crambessa Haeckel, 1872
- Leucandra crassior Ridley, 1881
- Leucandra crosslandi Thacker, 1908
- Leucandra crustacea (Haeckel, 1872)
- Leucandra cumberlandensis Lambe, 1900
- Leucandra curva (Schuffner, 1877)
- Leucandra cylindrica Fristedt, 1887
- Leucandra donnani Dendy, 1905
- Leucandra dwarkaensis Dendy, 1916
- Leucandra echinata Schuffner, 1877
- Leucandra egedii (Schmidt, 1870)
- Leucandra elegans (Lendenfeld, 1888)
- Leucandra erinacea Lendenfeld, 1888
- Leucandra falakra Klautau, Imesek, Azevedo, Plese, Nikolic & Cetkovic, 2016
- Leucandra falcigera Schuffner, 1877
- Leucandra fernandensis (Breitfuss, 1898)
- Leucandra fistulosa (Johnston, 1842)
- Leucandra foliata Hozawa, 1918
- Leucandra fragilis Hozawa, 1940
- Leucandra frigida Jenkin, 1908
- Leucandra gausapata Brøndsted, 1931
- Leucandra gaussii (Brøndsted, 1931)
- Leucandra glabra Hozawa, 1940
- Leucandra globosa Tanita, 1943
- Leucandra gossei (Bowerbank, 1862)
- Leucandra haurakii Brøndsted, 1927
- Leucandra heathi Urban, 1906
- Leucandra helena (Lendenfeld, 1885)
- Leucandra henrycarteri Van Soest & Hooper, 2020
- Leucandra hentschelii Brøndsted, 1931
- Leucandra hispida (Carter, 1886)
- Leucandra hozawai Tanita, 1942
- Leucandra impigra Tanita, 1942
- Leucandra intermedia (Haeckel, 1872)
- Leucandra irregularis (Burton, 1930)
- Leucandra kagoshimensis Hozawa, 1929
- Leucandra kerguelensis (Urban, 1908)
- Leucandra kurilensis Hozawa, 1918
- Leucandra laptevi Koltun, 1952
- Leucandra levis (Poléjaeff, 1883)
- Leucandra lobata (Carter, 1886)
- Leucandra loricata (Poléjaeff, 1883)
- Leucandra losangelensis (de Laubenfels, 1930)
- Leucandra magna Tanita, 1942
- Leucandra masatierrae (Breitfuss, 1898)
- Leucandra mawsoni Dendy, 1918
- Leucandra meandrina Lendenfeld, 1885
- Leucandra mediocancellata Hozawa, 1940
- Leucandra minima Row & Hozawa, 1931
- Leucandra minor (Urban, 1908)
- Leucandra mitsukurii Hozawa, 1929
- Leucandra mozambiquensis Van Soest & De Voogd, 2018
- Leucandra multifida (Carter, 1886)
- Leucandra multiformis Polejaeff, 1883
- Leucandra multituba Hozawa, 1929
- Leucandra nakamurai Tanita, 1942
- Leucandra nausicaae (Schuffner, 1877)
- Leucandra nicolae Wörheide & Hooper, 2003
- Leucandra odawarensis Hozawa, 1929
- Leucandra okinoseana Hozawa, 1929
- Leucandra onigaseana Hozawa, 1929
- Leucandra ovata (Poléjaeff, 1883)
- Leucandra pacifica Hozawa, 1929
- Leucandra palaoensis Tanita, 1943
- Leucandra pallida Row & Hozawa, 1931
- Leucandra pandora (Haeckel, 1872)
- Leucandra paucispina Hozawa, 1929
- Leucandra phillipensis Dendy, 1893
- Leucandra pilula Van Soest & De Voogd, 2018
- Leucandra platei (Breitfuss, 1898)
- Leucandra poculiformis Hozawa, 1918
- Leucandra polejaevi (Breitfuss, 1896)
- Leucandra prava (Breitfuss, 1898)
- Leucandra pulvinar (Haeckel, 1870)
- Leucandra pumila (Bowerbank, 1866)
- Leucandra pyriformis (Lambe, 1893)
- Leucandra ramosa (Burton, 1934)
- Leucandra regina Brøndsted, 1927
- Leucandra reniformis Tanita, 1943
- Leucandra rigida Hozawa, 1940
- Leucandra riojai Ferrer-Hernandez, 1918
- Leucandra rodriguezi (Lackschewitz, 1886)
- Leucandra rudifera (Poléjaeff, 1883)
- Leucandra sagmiana Hozawa, 1929
- Leucandra secutor Brøndsted, 1927
- Leucandra serrata Azevedo & Klautau, 2007
- Leucandra seychellensis Hozawa, 1940
- Leucandra sola Tanita, 1942
- Leucandra solida Hozawa, 1929
- Leucandra sphaeracella Wörheide & Hooper, 2003
- Leucandra spinifera Klautau, Imesek, Azevedo, Plese, Nikolic & Cetkovic, 2016
- Leucandra spinosa Hozawa, 1940
- Leucandra spissa (Urban, 1909)
- Leucandra splendens Hozawa, 1918
- Leucandra sulcata Ferrer-Hernandez, 1918
- Leucandra tahuatae Klautau, Lopes, Guarabyra, Folcher, Ekins & Debitus, 2020
- Leucandra taylori Lambe, 1900
- Leucandra thulakomorpha Row & Hozawa, 1931
- Leucandra tomentosa Tanita, 1940
- Leucandra topsenti Breitfuss, 1929
- Leucandra tropica Tanita, 1943
- Leucandra tuba Hozawa, 1918
- Leucandra tuberculata Hozawa, 1929
- Leucandra typica (Poléjaeff, 1883)
- Leucandra uschuariensis Tanita, 1942
- Leucandra vaginata Lendenfeld, 1885
- Leucandra valida Lambe, 1900
- Leucandra verdensis Thacker, 1908
- Leucandra vermiformis Tanita, 1941
- Leucandra vesicularis Brøndsted, 1927
- Leucandra villosa Lendenfeld, 1885
- Leucandra vitrea (Urban, 1908)
- Leucandra yuriagensis Hozawa, 1933
