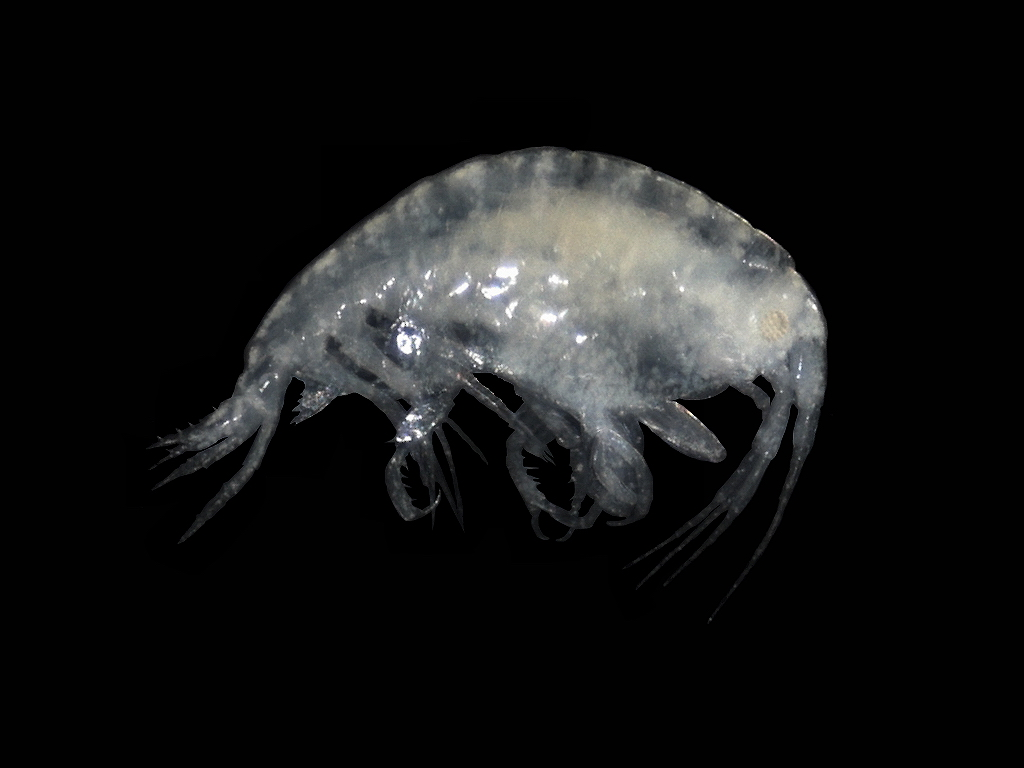
- Stenothoe marina

Scientific classification
- Kingdom: Animalia
- Phylum: Arthropoda
- Clade: Pancrustacea
- Class: Malacostraca
- Order: Amphipoda
- Superfamily: Amphilochoidea
- Family: Stenothoidae; Boeck, 1871

= Stenothoidae =

Family of crustaceans

Stenothoidae is a family of arthropods in the order Amphipoda.

== Genera ==
- Incertae sedis
  - Sudanea Krapp-Schickel, 2015
- Subfamily Stenothoinae Boeck, 1871
  - Aurometopa Barnard & Karaman, 1987
  - Goratelson Barnard, 1972
  - Hardametopa Barnard & Karaman, 1991
  - Knysmetopa Barnard & Karaman, 1987
  - Kyphometopa Krapp-Schickel, 2013
  - Ligulodactylus Krapp-Schickel, 2013
  - Malvinometopa Krapp-Schickel, 2011
  - Mesometopa Guryanova, 1938
  - Mesoproboloides Gurjanova, 1938
  - Metopa Boeck, 1871
  - Metopella Stebbing, 1906
  - Metopelloides Gurjanova, 1938
  - Metopoides Della Valle, 1893
  - Parametopa Chevreux, 1901
  - Parametopella Gurjanova, 1938
  - Paraprobolisca Ren in Ren & Huang, 1991
  - Probolisca Gurjanova, 1938
  - Proboloides Della Valle, 1893
  - Prometopa Schellenberg, 1926
  - Prostenothoe Gurjanova, 1938
  - Sandrothoe Krapp-Schickel, 2006
  - Scaphodactylus Rauschert & Andres, 1993
  - Stenothoe Dana, 1852
  - Stenothoides Chevreux, 1900
  - Stenula Barnard, 1962
  - Synkope Krapp-Schickel, 1999
  - Torometopa Barnard & Karaman, 1987
  - Victometopa Krapp-Schickel, 2011
  - Vonimetopa Barnard & Karaman, 1987
  - Wallametopa Barnard, 1974
  - Zaikometopa Barnard & Karaman, 1987
- Subfamily Thaumatelsoninae Gurjanova, 1938
  - Antatelson Barnard, 1972
  - Ausatelson Barnard, 1972
  - Chuculba Barnard, 1974
  - Parathaumatelson Gurjanova, 1938
  - Prothaumatelson Schellenberg, 1931
  - Pseudothaumatelson Schellenberg, 1931
  - Ptychotelson Krapp-Schickel, 2000
  - Pycnopyge Krapp-Schickel, 2000
  - Raukumara Krapp-Schickel, 2000
  - Raumahara Barnard, 1972
  - Thaumatelson Walker, 1906
  - Thaumatelsonella Rauschert & Andres, 1991
  - Verticotelson Krapp-Schickel, 2006
  - Yarra Krapp-Schickel, 2000
