= Stricklandiana =

Scientific classification
- Domain: Eukaryota
- Kingdom: Animalia
- Phylum: Arthropoda
- Class: Insecta
- Order: Coleoptera
- Suborder: Adephaga
- Family: Carabidae
- Subfamily: Lebiinae
- Tribe: Lebiini
- Subtribe: Pericalina
- Genus: Stricklandiana; Bousquet, 2002

Genus of beetles

Stricklandiana is a genus in the beetle family Carabidae. There are about 11 described species in Stricklandiana.

== Species ==
These 11 species belong to the genus Stricklandiana:

- Stricklandiana batantae (Baehr, 1997) (Indonesia and New Guinea)
- Stricklandiana carinata (Baehr, 1997) (Indonesia and New Guinea)
- Stricklandiana contracta (Louwerens, 1956) (Indonesia)
- Stricklandiana digulensis Baehr, 2011 (Indonesia and New Guinea)
- Stricklandiana glabrimargo (Baehr, 1997) (Indonesia and New Guinea)
- Stricklandiana lata (Darlington, 1968) (Indonesia and New Guinea)
- Stricklandiana longicornis (Baehr, 1997) (Indonesia and New Guinea)
- Stricklandiana marginalis (Louwerens, 1969) (Indonesia and New Guinea)
- Stricklandiana nigra (Sloane, 1907) (Australia)
- Stricklandiana pericalloides (W.J.MacLeay, 1886) (Indonesia and New Guinea)
- Stricklandiana setosa (Baehr, 1997) (Indonesia and New Guinea)
