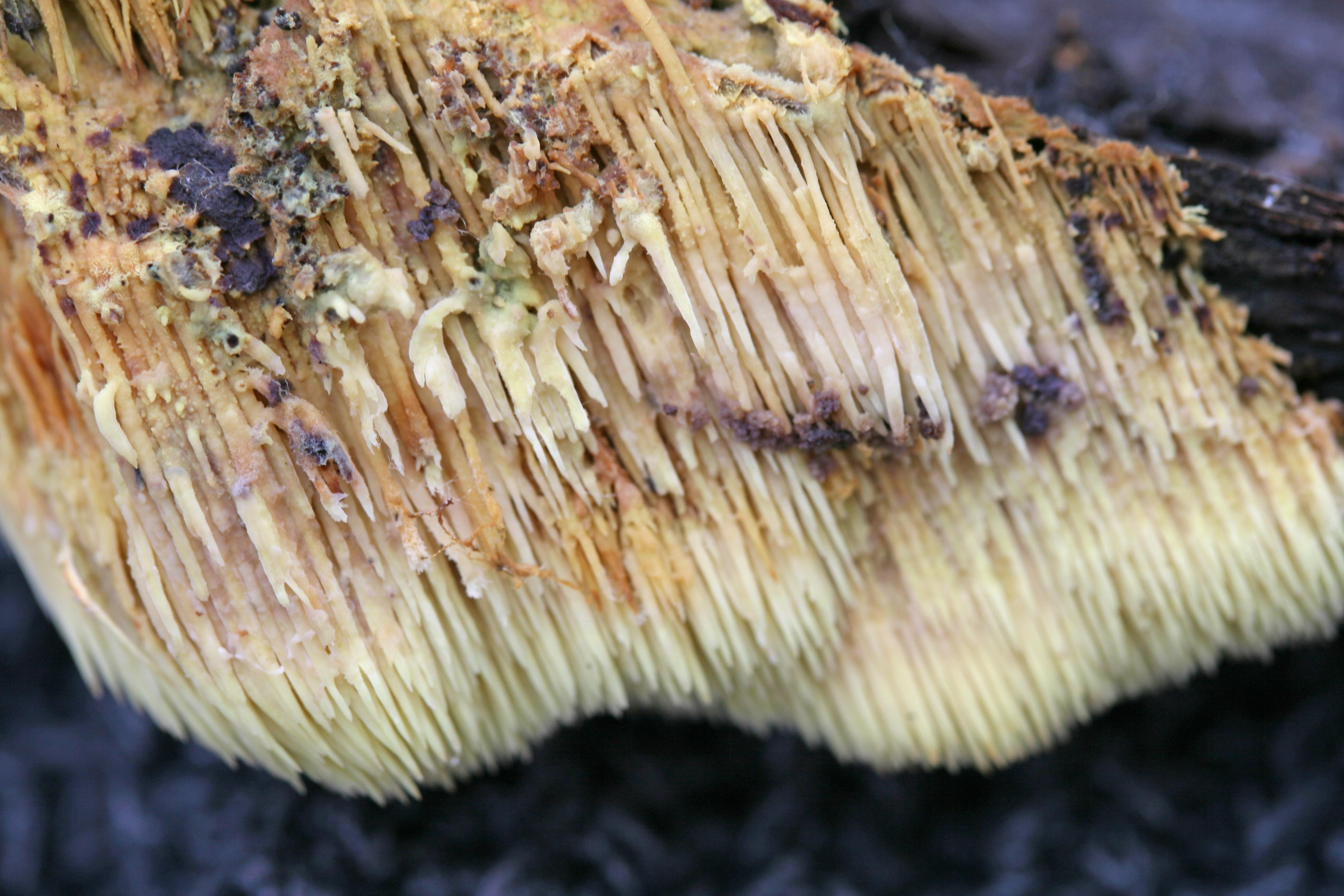

Scientific classification
- Domain: Eukaryota
- Kingdom: Fungi
- Division: Basidiomycota
- Class: Agaricomycetes
- Order: Polyporales
- Family: Meruliaceae
- Genus: Sarcodontia
- Species: S. setosa

Binomial name
- Sarcodontia setosa (Pers.) Donk (1952)

Synonyms
- Hydnum setosum Pers. (1825); Dryodon setosus (Pers.) Pat. (1889); Hydnum earleanum Sumst. (1904); Acia setosa (Pers.) Bourdot & Galzin (1928); Mycoacia setosa (Pers.) Donk (1931); Oxydontia setosa (Pers.) L.W.Mill. (1933); Hydnum luteocarneum Secr. (1833)

= Sarcodontia setosa =

Species of fungus

Sarcodontia setosa is a species of toothed crust fungus in the family Meruliaceae. It is a white rot species that is found in Europe and North America.

== Taxonomy ==
The fungus was originally described by Christiaan Hendrik Persoon in 1825 as Hydnum setosum. Marinus Anton Donk transferred it to the genus Sarcodontia in 1952.

== Description ==
The fungus grows as a thick, yellow crust on the underside of damaged apple tree branches, with dimensions of 3–20 cm (1–8 in) wide by 5–20 cm (2–8 in) long. The tightly-packed teeth are 5–12 mm (0.2–0.5 in) long and have tapered tips. They are pale to bright yellow in colour, although both bruising and age tend to cause a reddish discolouration. The odour of the fungus has been described as "fruity but unpleasant".

Fruit bodies of the fungus contain the benzoquinone-derived compound sarcodontic acid, which impart the yellow colour. The fungus is inedible, but can be used as a mushroom dye, and produces a pinkish-brown colour with a variety of mordants.
