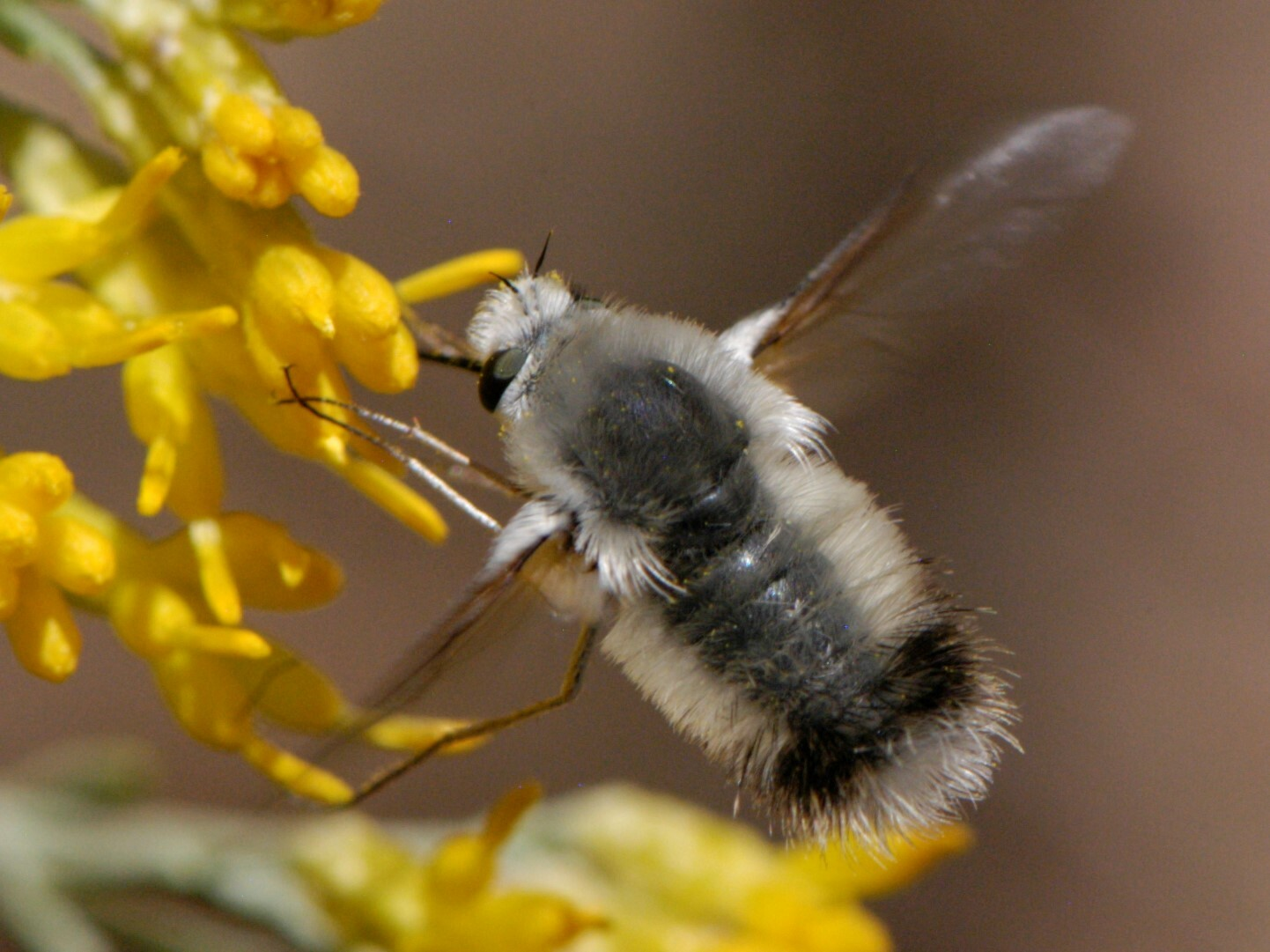

Scientific classification
- Domain: Eukaryota
- Kingdom: Animalia
- Phylum: Arthropoda
- Class: Insecta
- Order: Diptera
- Family: Bombyliidae
- Tribe: Bombyliini
- Genus: Anastoechus
- Species: A. hessei

Binomial name
- Anastoechus hessei Hall, 1958

Synonyms
- Anastoechus deserticola Hall, 1956

= Anastoechus hessei =

Species of fly

Anastoechus hessei is a species of bee fly in the family Bombyliidae. It is found in the southwestern United States from California to Texas. Its larvae are predators of grasshopper eggs.
