= Abacetus hessei =

Scientific classification
- Kingdom: Animalia
- Phylum: Arthropoda
- Class: Insecta
- Order: Coleoptera
- Suborder: Adephaga
- Family: Carabidae
- Genus: Abacetus
- Species: A. hessei

Binomial name
- Abacetus hessei Straneo, 1940

Species of beetle

Abacetus hessei is a species of ground beetle in the subfamily Pterostichinae. It was found in the massive collection of Count Pierre François Marie Auguste Dejean in 1828, but it was not classified until 1940 by an Italian entomologist Stefano Ludovico Straneo
