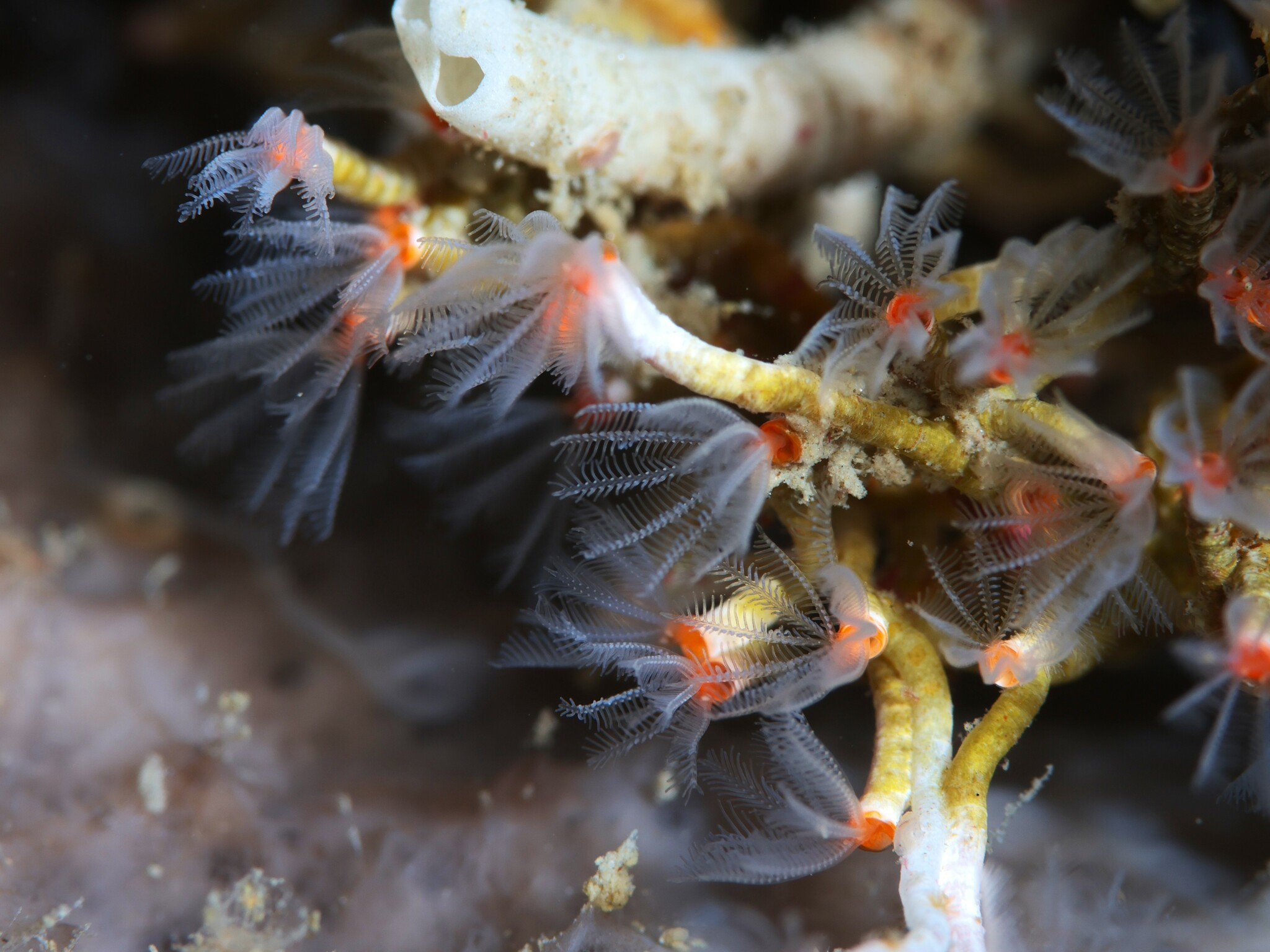
- Salmacina australis

Scientific classification
- Kingdom: Animalia
- Phylum: Annelida
- Clade: Pleistoannelida
- Clade: Sedentaria
- Order: Sabellida
- Family: Serpulidae
- Subfamily: Filograninae
- Genus: Salmacina; Claparède, 1870

= Salmacina =

Genus of annelid worms

Salmacina is a genus of marine polychaete worms in the family Serpulidae. The type species is Salmacina incrustans Claparède, 1870.

== Species ==
The following species are classified in this genus:

- Salmacina amphidentata Jones, 1962
- Salmacina australis Haswell, 1885
- Salmacina ceciliae Nogueira & ten Hove, 2000
- Salmacina dysteri (Huxley, 1855)
- Salmacina huxleyi (Ehlers, 1887)
- Salmacina incrustans Claparède, 1870
- Salmacina piranga (Grube, 1872)
- Salmacina setosa Langerhans, 1884
- Salmacina tribranchiata (Moore, 1923)
