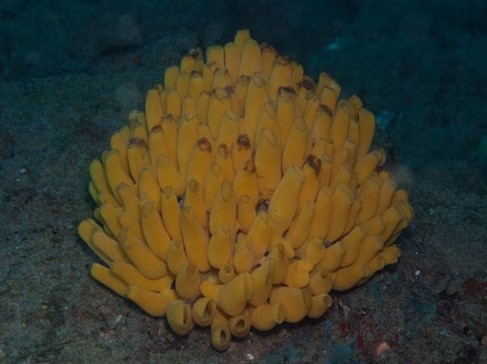
- Ute insulagemmae

Scientific classification
- Kingdom: Animalia
- Phylum: Porifera
- Class: Calcarea
- Order: Leucosolenida
- Family: Grantiidae
- Genus: Ute; Schmidt, 1862

Species
- Ute ampullacea Wörheide & Hooper, 2003; Ute armata Hozawa, 1929; Ute glabra Schmidt, 1864; Ute gladiata Borojevic, 1966; Ute insulagemmae Van Soest & De Voogd, 2018; Ute pedunculata Hozawa, 1929; Ute spenceri Dendy, 1893; Ute spiculosa Dendy, 1893; Ute syconoides (Carter, 1886); Ute viridis Schmidt, 1868

= Ute (sponge) =

Genus of sponges

Ute is a genus of calcareous sponges belonging to the family Grantiidae.
