= Stephan Schulzer von Müggenburg =

Hungarian-Croatian army officer and mycologist

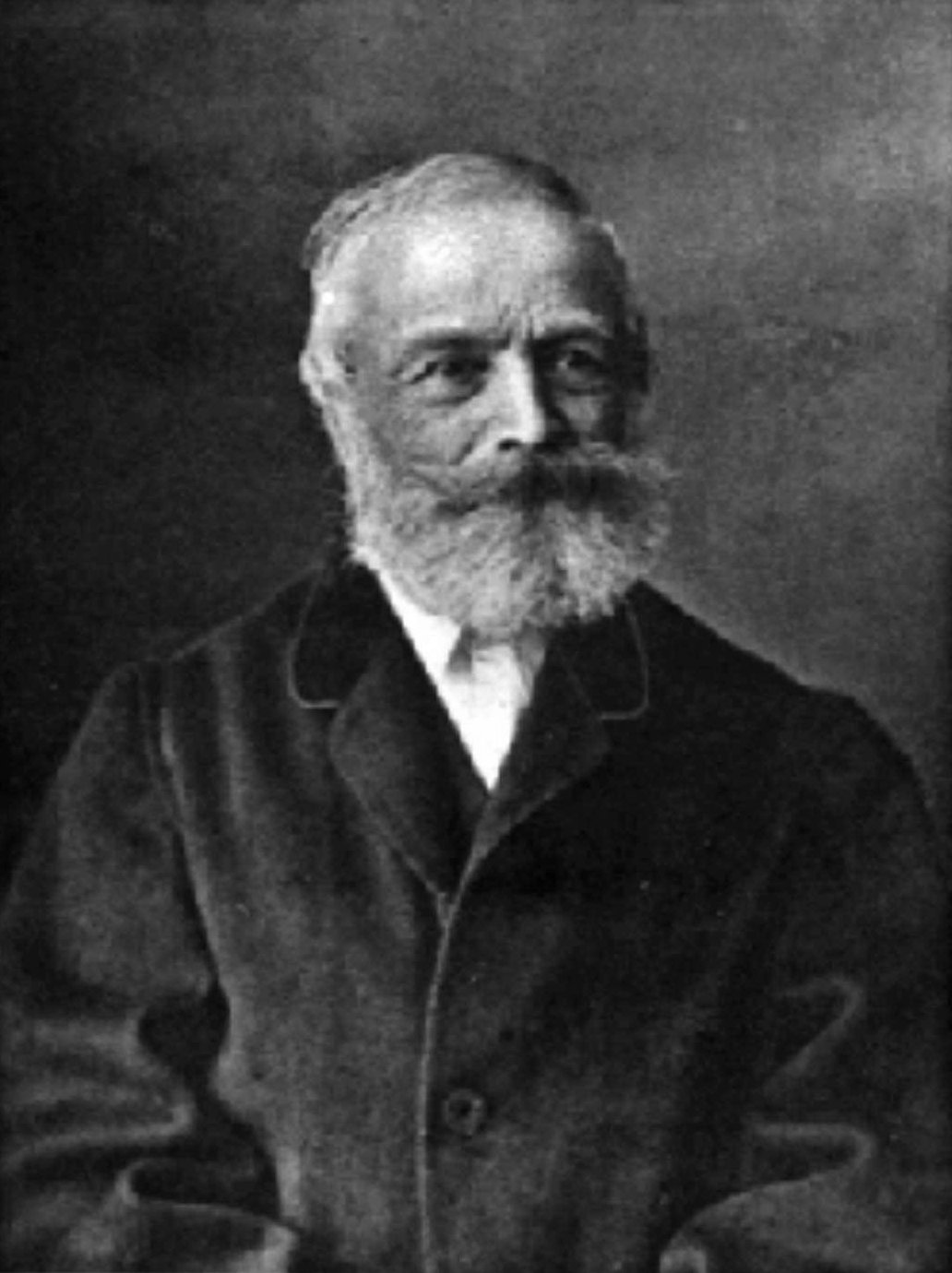
- Born: December 19, 1802; Viduševac, Kingdom of Croatia, Habsburg Empire
- Died: February 5, 1892 (aged 89); Vinkovci, Kingdom of Croatia-Slavonia, Austria-Hungary
- Citizenship: Hungarian
- Awards: Genus Schulzeria (Agaricales) bears his name
- Scientific career
- Fields: Mycology
- Author abbrev. (botany): Schulzer

Stephan Schulzer von Müggenburg (December 19, 1802 – February 5, 1892) was a Hungarian-Croatian army officer and mycologist. His first name is variably spelled Stefan, Stjepan or István.

Schulzer von Müggenburg was born into abject poverty in a dilapidated castle at the periphery of the Austro-Hungarian Empire. His mother died in his early childhood. He was brought up by, and received a Spartan home-education from, his well educated but very strict father, a retired army officer of Saxonian descent, who died when Schulzer was fifteen. Schulzer spent the following three years in a military academy-like company of cadets in Olomouc (Olmütz). After enlisting he spent seven years as Cadet (officer in training) and the following six as Fähnrich (officer candidate). Having finally attained the rank of a second lieutenant he became a captain within the following ten years. In 1821 he participated in the Piedmont campaign. In fighting a fire he lost the use of both hands and was retired from active duty two years later. He however volunteered to establish and manage a military hospital where he fell victim to a disease which left him deaf and vision impaired. He was married and had two daughters.

A chance encounter with a popular mushroom manual in 1831 awakened his intellectual curiosity. He taught himself natural history and sufficient Greek and Latin. Within a relatively short time he evolved from a gifted amateur mycologist to one appreciated by his more academic peers. In the interim he regained most of the use of his hands and some hearing. He published extensively in the mycological literature of his time. Much of his work remains unpublished, but some was edited and published by his colleagues and at times scientific rivals Károly Kalchbrenner and Friedrich von Hazslin.

The genus Schulzeria (Agaricales) bears his name.

== Selected works ==
- Schulzer von Müggenburg, Stefan. Systematische aufzählung des Schwämme Ungarns, Slavoniens und des Banates, welche diese Länder mit anderen gemein haben. 1857.
- Schulzer von Müggenburg, Stefan. Beiträge zur Pilzkunde. 1860
- Schulzer von Müggenburg, Stefan. Mycologische Beobachtungen für 1864. 1864
- Schulzer von Müggenburg, Stefan, Ágost Kanitz, and József Armin Knapp. Die bisher bekannten Pflanzen Slavoniens. Including addenda 1, 2. 1866.
- Schulzer von Müggenburg, Stefan, Mykologische Miscellen. 1866
- Schulzer von Müggenburg, Stephan. Mykologische Beiträge. K.K. Zoologisch-botanische Gesellschaft, Wien 1870.
- Schulzer von Müggenburg, Stephan. Mykologische Beobachtungen aus Nord-Ungarn im Herbste 1869. K.K. Zoologisch-botanische Gesellschaft, Wien 1870.
- Schulzer von Müggenburg, Stephan. Mykologisches : die heutige Gattung Agaricus. Wien : Verfassers, 1882
- Schulzer von Müggenburg, Stephan. Das Unangenehmste Erlebniss auf der Bahn meines Wissenschaftlichen forschens : eine Beleuchtung unserer mycologischen Zustände. Zagreb : Albrecht, 1886
- Schulzer von Müggenburg, Stephan. Einige Worte über die Magyarhon Myxogasterei irta hazslinszki Frigyes Esperies 1877. Zagreb : Albrecht, 1886
- Schulzer von Müggenburg, Stephan. Berichtigungen Helvellaceen. Zagreb : Albrecht, 1886.
