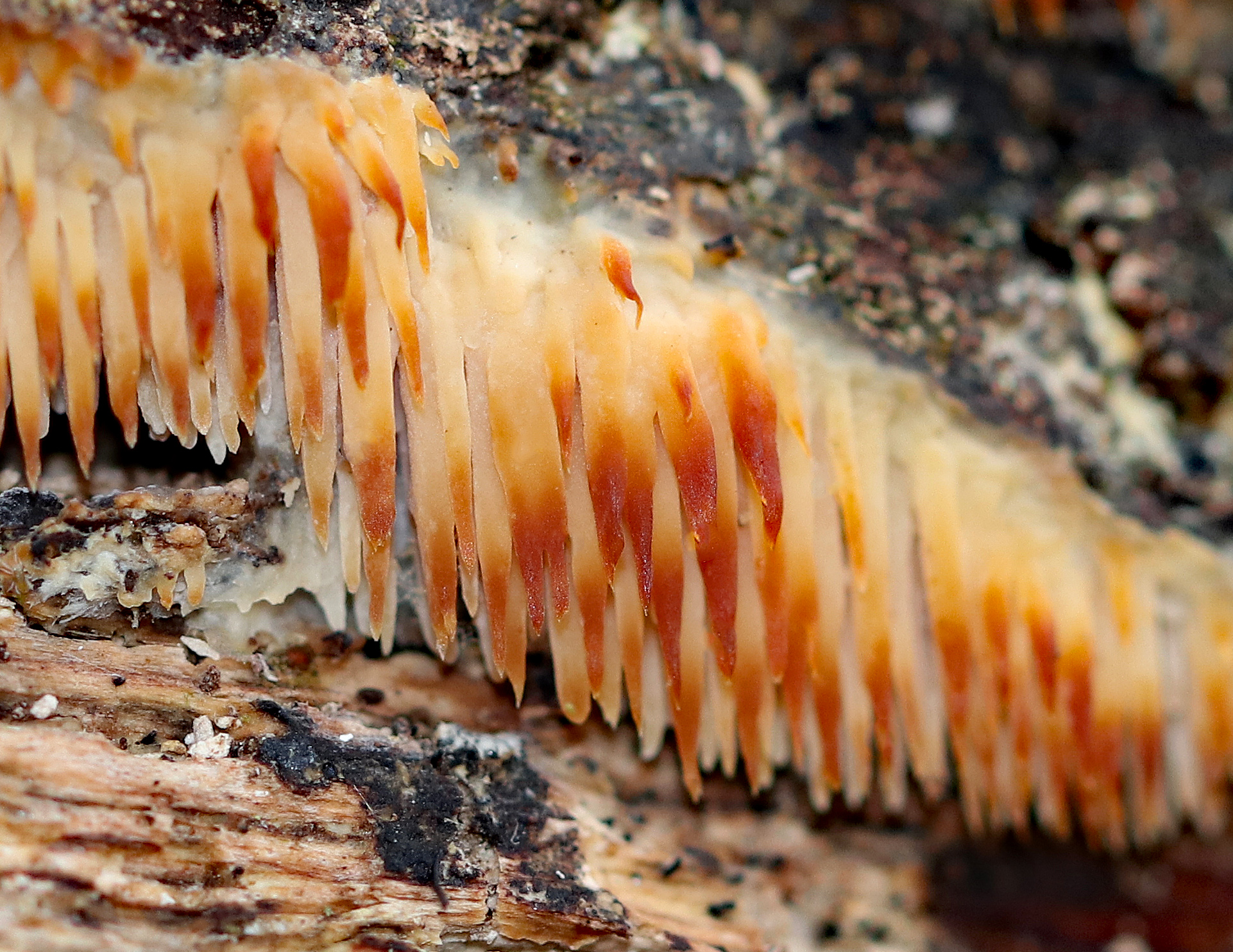
- Sarcodontia setosa

Scientific classification
- Domain: Eukaryota
- Kingdom: Fungi
- Division: Basidiomycota
- Class: Agaricomycetes
- Order: Polyporales
- Family: Meruliaceae
- Genus: Sarcodontia; Schulzer (1866)

Synonyms
- Oxydontia L.W.Mill. (1933)

= Sarcodontia =

Genus of fungi

Sarcodontia is a genus of toothed fungi in the family Meruliaceae. It was circumscribed by Hungarian–Croatian mycologist Stephan Schulzer von Müggenburg in 1866, with Sarcodontia mali as the type species.

== Species ==
- Sarcodontia amplissima (Berk. & M.A. Curtis) Nakasone (2021)
- Sarcodontia delectans (Peck) Spirin (2001)
- Sarcodontia setosa (Pers.) Donk (1952)
- Sarcodontia spumea (Sowerby) Spirin (2001)
- Sarcodontia unicolor (Fr.) Zmitr. & Spirin (2006)
