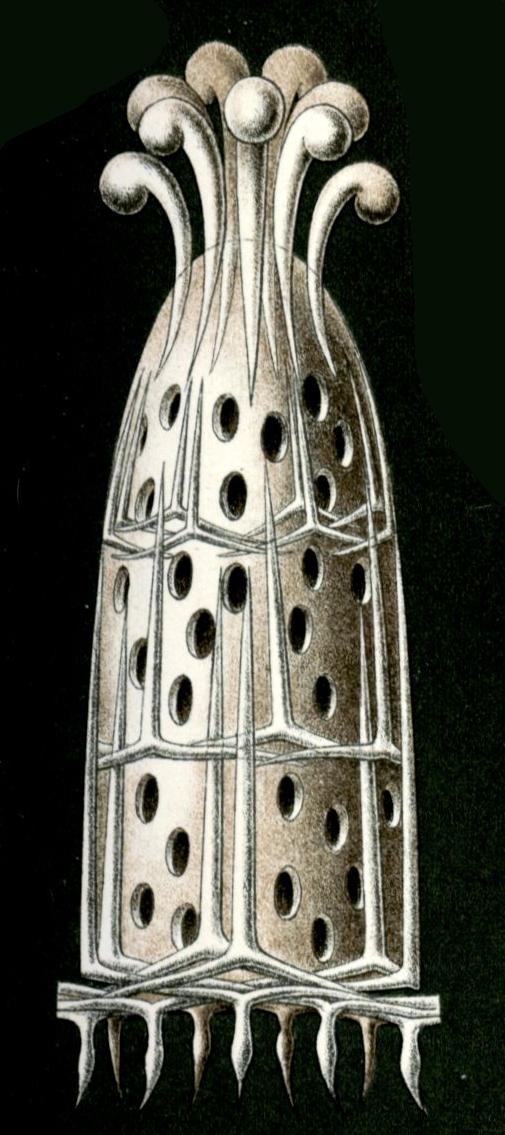
- Illustration of Grantia compressa by Ernst Haeckel

Scientific classification
- Kingdom: Animalia
- Phylum: Porifera
- Class: Calcarea
- Order: Leucosolenida
- Family: Grantiidae; Dendy, 1892

Genera
- Amphiute Hanitsch, 1894; Aphroceras Gray, 1858; Grantia Fleming, 1828; Leucandra Haeckel, 1872; Leucandrilla Borojevic, Boury-Esnault & Vacelet, 2000; Leucettaga Haeckel, 1872; Paragrantia Hôzawa, 1940; Sycandra Haeckel, 1872; Sycodorus Haeckel, 1872; Sycute Dendy & Row, 1913; Synute Dendy, 1892; Teichonopsis Dendy & Row, 1913; Ute Schmidt, 1862

= Grantiidae =

Family of calcareous sponges in the order Leucosolenida

Grantiidae is a family of calcareous sponges in the order Leucosolenida.
