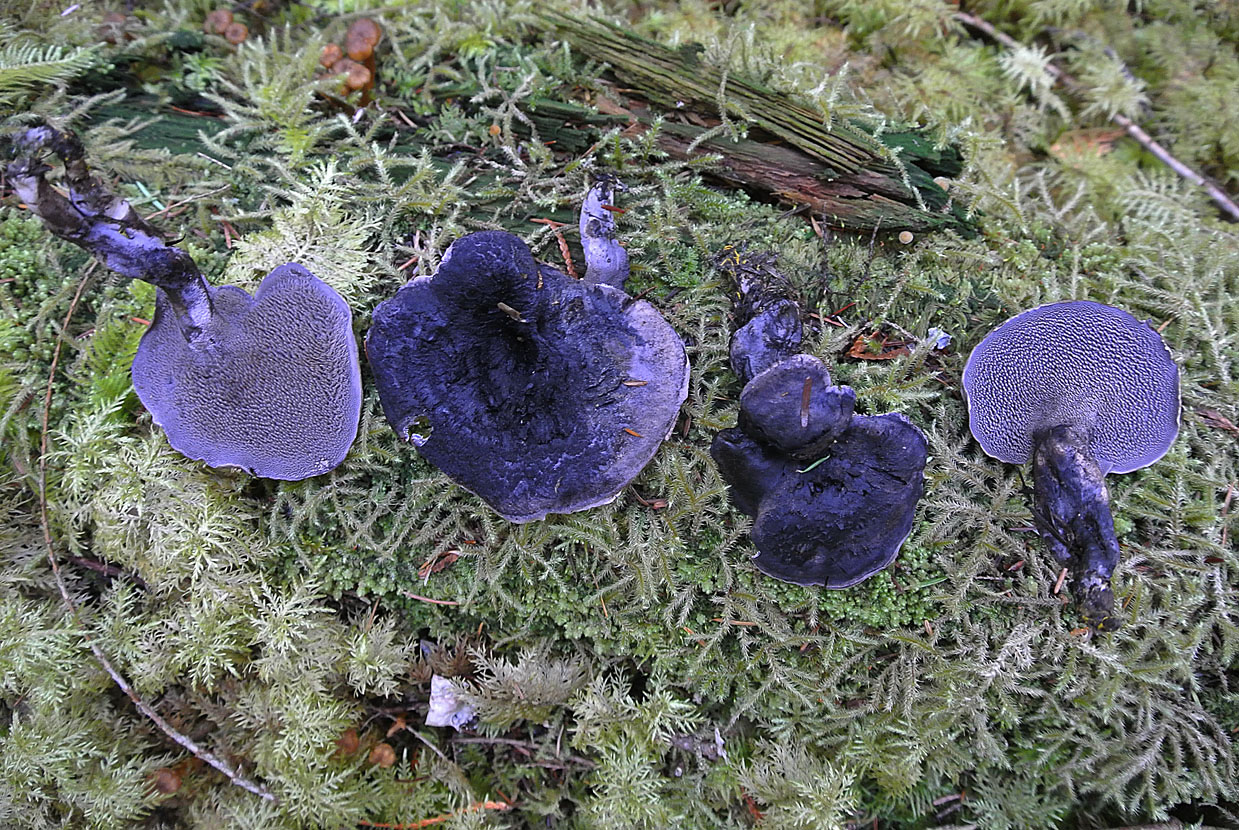

Scientific classification
- Kingdom: Fungi
- Division: Basidiomycota
- Class: Agaricomycetes
- Order: Thelephorales
- Family: Bankeraceae
- Genus: Hydnellum
- Species: H. fuscoindicum

Binomial name
- Hydnellum fuscoindicum (K.A.Harrison) E.Larss., K.H.Larss. & Kõljalg

Synonyms
- Hydnum fuscoindicum K.A.Harrison (1964); Sarcodon fuscoindicus (K.A.Harrison) Maas Geest. (1967)

= Hydnellum fuscoindicum =

Species of fungus

Hydnellum fuscoindicum
- Mycological characteristics
- Teeth on hymenium
- Cap is convex or depressed
- Hymenium is decurrent
- Stipe is bare
- Spore print is brown
- Ecology is mycorrhizal
- Edibility is not recommended

Hydnellum fuscoindicum, commonly known as the violet hedgehog, is a species of tooth fungus in the genus Hydnellum. The fungus was first described by Kenneth A. Harrison in 1964 as a species of Hydnum, then transferred to Sarcodon in 1967 by Rudolph Arnold Maas Geesteranus. He placed this species in section Violacei of Sarcodon, along with H. fuligineoviolaceum and H. joeides.

It produces fruit bodies with a violet-black cap, violet flesh, and violet spines on the cap underside. The odor and taste are very farinaceous. It is not recommended for consumption due to producing a burning sensation. It is found in the Pacific Northwest in moss around western hemlocks.
