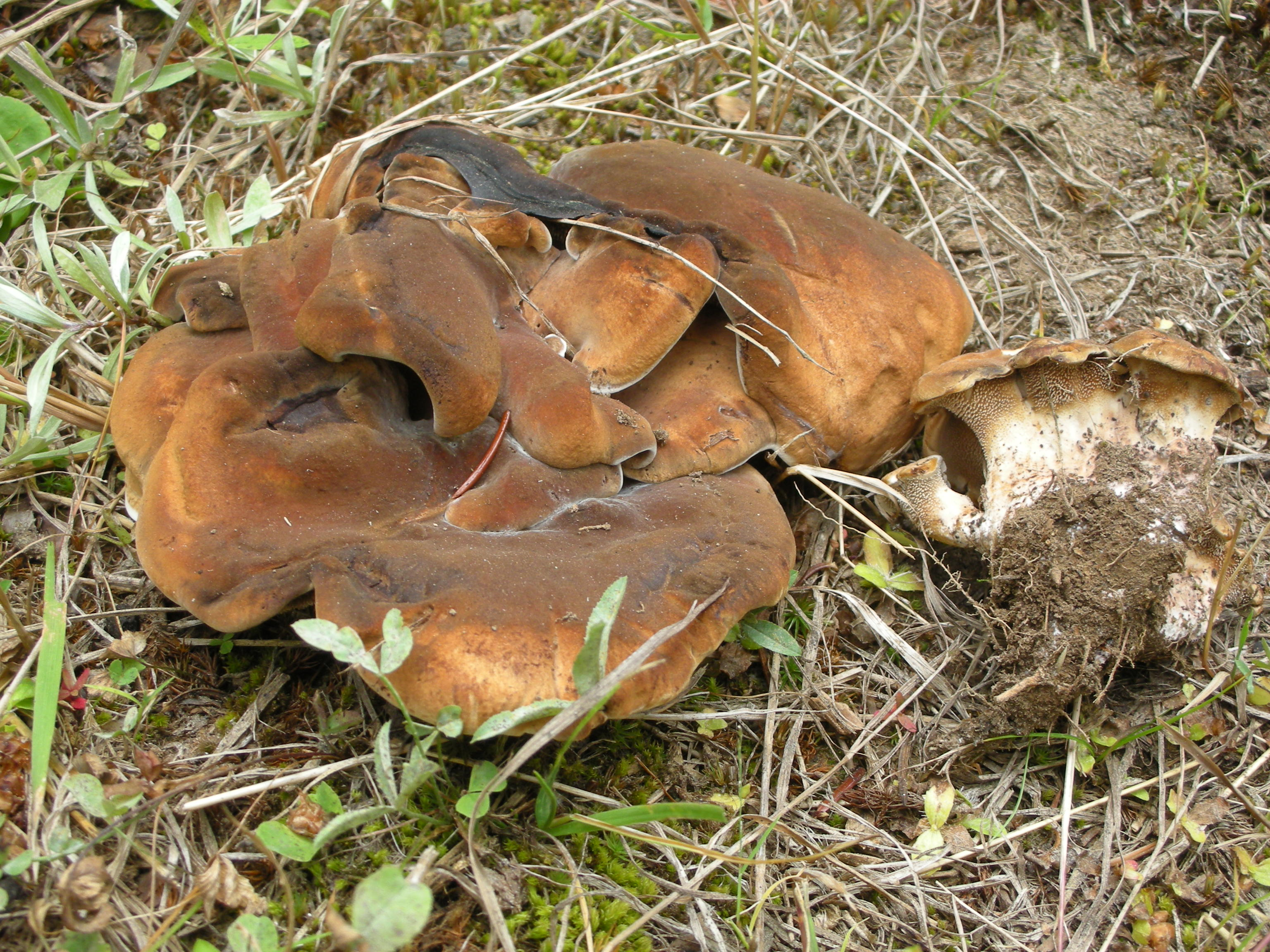

Conservation status
- Vulnerable (IUCN 3.1)

Scientific classification
- Kingdom: Fungi
- Division: Basidiomycota
- Class: Agaricomycetes
- Order: Thelephorales
- Family: Bankeraceae
- Genus: Hydnellum
- Species: H. martioflavum

Binomial name
- Hydnellum martioflavum (Snell, K.A.Harrison & H.A.C.Jacks.) E.Larss., K.H.Larss. & Kõljalg

Synonyms
- Hydnum martioflavum Snell, K.A.Harrison & H.A.C.Jacks. (1962); Sarcodon armeniacus Maas Geest. (1963); Sarcodon martioflavus (Snell, K.A.Harrison & H.A.C.Jacks.) Maas Geest. (1964)

= Hydnellum martioflavum =

Species of tooth fungus

Hydnellum martioflavum is a species of tooth fungus in the family Bankeraceae, found in Europe and North America. It produces fleshy, yellowish-brown to purplish-brown caps up to 10 cm across with downward-pointing spines underneath, and grows in association with coniferous trees. The species is considered vulnerable in Switzerland.

== Taxonomy ==
The species was first described by the mycologists Wally Snell, Kenneth A. Harrison, and Henry Jackson in 1962 as Hydnum martioflavum. Rudolph Arnold Maas Geesteranus transferred it to the genus Sarcodon in 1964. He considered his Sarcodon armeniacus, described the year previously, to be a synonym. The fungus was originally described from collections made in Quebec and Nova Scotia, Canada, growing under spruce and balsam fir.

In molecular phylogenetics analysis, H. martioflavum was shown to be most closely related to H. caeruleum.

== Description ==
Hydnellum martioflavum produces fleshy fruit bodies (basidiocarps) that may occur singly or in small groups. The cap (pileus), reaching up to 10 cm in diameter, is initially flat to slightly depressed in the centre. Its surface is finely velutinate—that is, covered in a soft, velvet‑like down—before becoming smooth (glabrous) or developing gentle wrinkles with age. Young caps are ochraceous yellow‑brown, gradually darkening to purplish‑brown as they mature. Underneath, the hymenophore consists of downward‑pointing spines up to 5 mm long; these spines start off whitish and soon take on a purplish‑brown hue. The flesh (context) is white in the cap but turns brownish in the stipe.

The stipe measures up to 5 cm in height and about 2 cm in width. It is cylindrical and initially velutinate like the cap, later matching the cap's colour as it ages. The context of the stipe remains brownish throughout. Under the microscope, the context tissue comprises simple‑septate hyphae—thread‑like cells divided by single cross‑walls—up to 20 micrometre (μm) wide. The spores (basidiospores) are pale brown, distinctly angular in outline, and measure 5–6.3 by 3.6–4.5 μm.

== Habitat and distribution ==
The distribution of this fungus more or less follows the distribution of pine trees in Europe. In Norway, the northern extent of its range is Troms. It is considered vulnerable in Switzerland.
