= Hydnellum multiceps =

Scientific classification
- Domain: Eukaryota
- Kingdom: Fungi
- Division: Basidiomycota
- Class: Agaricomycetes
- Order: Thelephorales
- Family: Bankeraceae
- Genus: Hydnellum
- Species: H. multiceps

Binomial name
- Hydnellum multiceps K.A.Harrison (1961)

Species of fungus

Hydnellum multiceps is a rare species of tooth fungus in the family Bankeraceae. Found in Nova Scotia, Canada, it was described as new to science in 1961 by mycologist Kenneth A. Harrison. The fungus has fruitbodies of overlapping and fused caps. Single caps measure 3–5 cm (1.2–2.0 in) in diameter, while fused masses can be up to 30 cm (12 in) in diameter and 8 cm (3 in) tall. The upper cap surface is initially pale brown but darken in maturity. The greyish-brown to dark brown spines on the cap underside measure 2–5 mm long. The fungus has been recorded growing as a partial fairy ring measuring about 20 ft (6 m) in diameter, in spruce woods in Glenmont, Nova Scotia; it has also been recorded from Cape Breton Island. The spores are roughly spherical with sharp processes, and dimensions of 3–4.5 by 3–4 μm.
