= Glenmont =

Glenmont may refer to:

== Places ==
=== United States ===
- Glenmont, Maryland, an unincorporated community and census-designated place in Montgomery County
  - Glenmont (Washington Metro), the Washington Metro station that serves the aforementioned suburb
- Glenmont, New York, a hamlet in the town of Bethlehem, Albany County
- Glenmont, Ohio, a village in Holmes County
- Glenmont (house), the home of inventor Thomas Edison, in Llewellyn Park in West Orange, New Jersey

=== Canada ===
- Glenmont, Nova Scotia, a community in the Canadian province of Nova Scotia, located in Kings County.
