= Hydnellum septentrionale =

Scientific classification
- Domain: Eukaryota
- Kingdom: Fungi
- Division: Basidiomycota
- Class: Agaricomycetes
- Order: Thelephorales
- Family: Bankeraceae
- Genus: Hydnellum
- Species: H. septentrionale

Binomial name
- Hydnellum septentrionale K.A.Harrison (1964)

Species of fungus

Hydnellum septentrionale is a tooth fungus in the family Bankeraceae. Found in Michigan, it was described as new to science in 1964 by Canadian mycologist Kenneth A. Harrison.
