= Hydnellum frondosum =

Scientific classification
- Domain: Eukaryota
- Kingdom: Fungi
- Division: Basidiomycota
- Class: Agaricomycetes
- Order: Thelephorales
- Family: Bankeraceae
- Genus: Hydnellum
- Species: H. frondosum

Binomial name
- Hydnellum frondosum K.A.Harrison (1961)

Species of fungus

Hydnellum frondosum is a tooth fungus in the family Bankeraceae. Found in Nova Scotia, Canada, it was described as new to science in 1961 by mycologist Kenneth A. Harrison. Its fruitbodies have caps that individually measure 1.8–4 cm (0.7–1.6 in) across, but can coalesce to create larger fused structures up to 14 cm (5.5 in). The cap surface is greyish brown, with broad whitish margins in age. The spines on the cap underside are small–up to 1 mm long, and extend quite a ways down the length of the stipe. The spore print is fawn; individual spores are roughly spherical and measure 3.5–4.5 by 3–4 μm. Fruit bodies have been found growing near pine and hemlock, in mixed forest of Kings County, Nova Scotia.
