= Hydnellum cyanodon =

Scientific classification
- Domain: Eukaryota
- Kingdom: Fungi
- Division: Basidiomycota
- Class: Agaricomycetes
- Order: Thelephorales
- Family: Bankeraceae
- Genus: Hydnellum
- Species: H. cyanodon

Binomial name
- Hydnellum cyanodon K.A.Harrison (1964)

Species of fungus

Hydnellum cyanodon is a rare species of tooth fungus in the family Bankeraceae. Found in Boularderie Island and Antigonish County (Nova Scotia, Canada), it was described as new to science in 1964 by Canadian mycologist Kenneth A. Harrison. The turbinate (cushion-shaped) cap of the fruitbody measures 3–6 cm (1.2–2.4 in) in diameter. Spines on the cap underside up to 5 mm long, and blue in color. The fungus fruits singly or in groups in deep moss under spruce trees.
