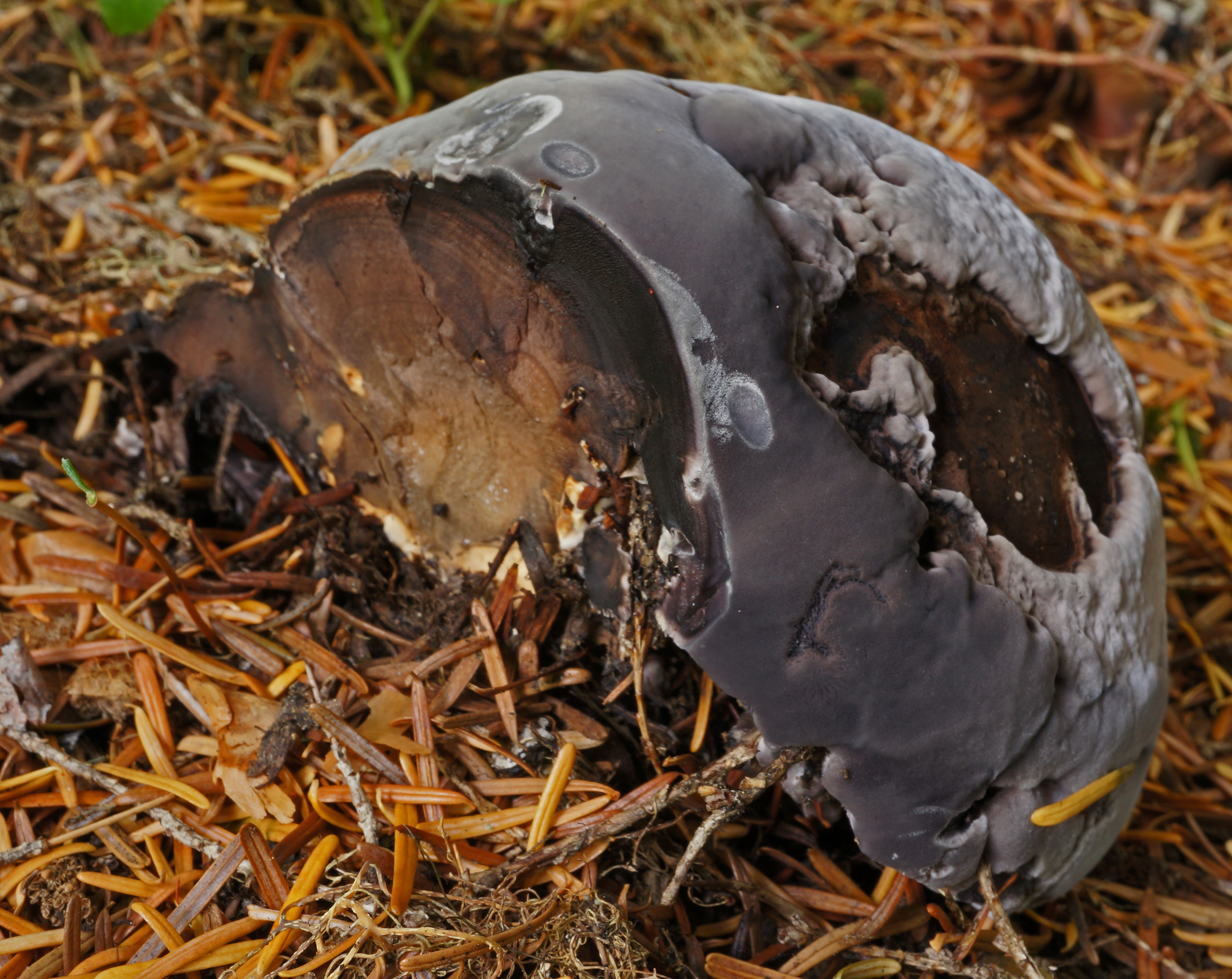

Scientific classification
- Domain: Eukaryota
- Kingdom: Fungi
- Division: Basidiomycota
- Class: Agaricomycetes
- Order: Thelephorales
- Family: Bankeraceae
- Genus: Hydnellum
- Species: H. regium

Binomial name
- Hydnellum regium K.A.Harrison (1964)

= Hydnellum regium =

Species of fungus

Hydnellum regium is a tooth fungus in the family Bankeraceae. Found in western North America, it was described as new to science in 1964 by Canadian mycologist Kenneth A. Harrison, who reported collections from Oregon, Idaho, and Colorado. It fruits singly or in groups under pine and spruce trees.

Its purple-black fruitbodies are large, forming complex rosettes measuring up 25 cm (10 in) wide by 15 cm (6 in) tall. The spore print is brown. Its spores are roughly spherical, tuberculate (covered with rounded bumps), and measure 4.5–6 by 3.5–4.5 μm.
