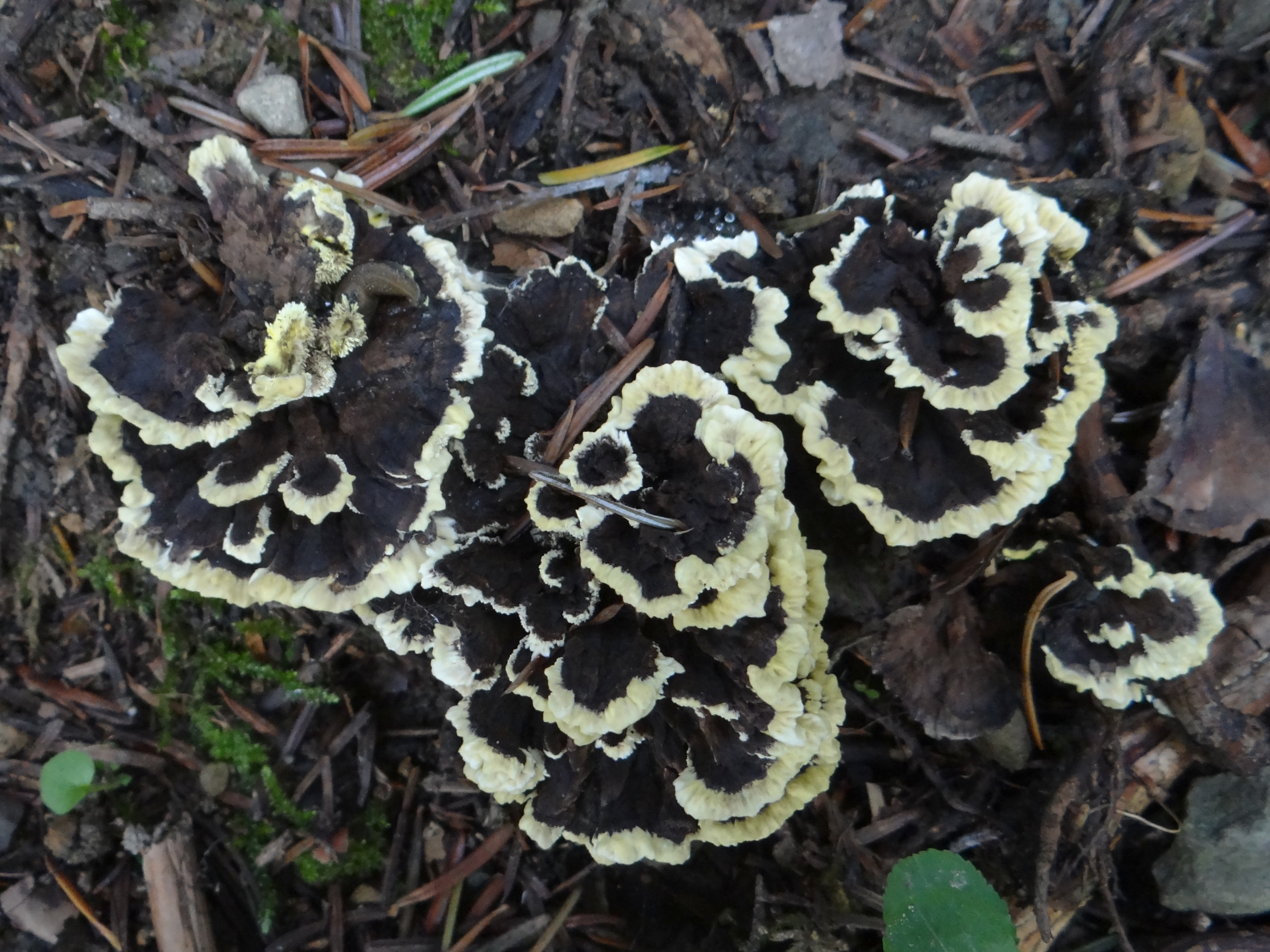

Scientific classification
- Domain: Eukaryota
- Kingdom: Fungi
- Division: Basidiomycota
- Class: Agaricomycetes
- Order: Thelephorales
- Family: Bankeraceae
- Genus: Hydnellum
- Species: H. geogenium

Binomial name
- Hydnellum geogenium (Fr.) Banker (1913)

Synonyms
- Hydnum geogenium Fr. (1852); Hydnum sulfureum Saut. (1869); Calodon geogenius (Fr.) P.Karst. (1881)>

= Hydnellum geogenium =

Species of tooth fungus

Hydnellum geogenium is a species of tooth fungus in the family Bankeraceae. The fungus is found in Europe and North America, where it grows in coniferous woods. It is inedible. Fruitbodies of the fungus contain a yellow pigment compound called geogenin.

== Taxonomy ==
The fungus was described as new to science in 1852 by Elias Magnus Fries. Howard James Banker transferred it to the genus Hydnellum in 1913.

== Description ==
Hydnellum geogenium produces solitary or often confluent basidiocarps with caps (pilei) up to 10 cm wide. The cap surface may be divided into irregular lobes of varying lengths, bearing small wart-like bumps (tuberculate) or radial furrows. Its colour ranges from lemon-yellow to sulphur-yellow or pale yellow, and in damp conditions the surface frequently exudes droplets of reddish fluid. Underneath, the hymenophore (the fertile, spore-bearing surface) consists of downward-pointing spines up to 3 mm long, characteristic of hydnoid fungi. The flesh (context) is initially yellow, darkening to brown with age, and the fruit bodies emit a mild aromatic odour and retain a gentle taste.

The stipe is cylindrical to tapering, reaching up to 3 cm in height and 2 cm in width, and shares the cap's citric yellow hue. Microscopically, the fungal tissue comprises hyphae 2–6 micrometres (μm) wide that bear clamp connections, ensuring proper nuclear distribution during cell division. The ascospores are roughly spherical (subglobose), measuring 4–5 × 3–3.5 μm, and feature a tuberculate surface that may aid in spore dispersal.

== Habitat and distribution ==
Hydnellum geogenium is widely distributed in temperate regions of northern hemisphere, with its northern range extending to the Polar circle. It forms mycorrhizae with Picea trees. In Europe, the northern extent of its range is southeast Norway. It appears on the red lists of Germany, Poland, and Sweden. H. geogenium is considered endangered in Switzerland.
