= Hydnellum cumulatum =

Scientific classification
- Domain: Eukaryota
- Kingdom: Fungi
- Division: Basidiomycota
- Class: Agaricomycetes
- Order: Thelephorales
- Family: Bankeraceae
- Genus: Hydnellum
- Species: H. cumulatum

Binomial name
- Hydnellum cumulatum K.A.Harrison (1964)

Species of fungus

Hydnellum cumulatum is a tooth fungus in the family Bankeraceae. It was described as new to science in 1964 by Canadian mycologist Kenneth A. Harrison. The fungus is found in Kings County and Annapolis County, Nova Scotia (Canada), where it fruits singly, in groups, or is fused masses in stands of red pine (Pinus resinosa) and eastern hemlock (Tsuga canadensis). The fruitbody resembles that of H. diabolus, but lacks the acrid taste of that species. In 2009, H. cumulatum was reported from Sweden, having been previously misidentified as Hydnellum scrobiculatum.
