= Hydnellum rickeri =

Scientific classification
- Domain: Eukaryota
- Kingdom: Fungi
- Division: Basidiomycota
- Class: Agaricomycetes
- Order: Thelephorales
- Family: Bankeraceae
- Genus: Hydnellum
- Species: H. rickeri

Binomial name
- Hydnellum rickeri Banker (1913)

Synonyms
- Hydnum rickeri (Banker) Trotter (1925)

Species of fungus

Hydnellum rickeri is a tooth fungus in the family Bankeraceae. Found in North America, it was described as new to science in 1913 by mycologist Howard James Banker from collections made in Orono, Maine. It is named after botanist Percy L. Ricker, who collected the type specimen. Fruit bodies are dingy brown to olive-colored, and have a strong, spicy odor (somewhat resembling melilot) that persists after they have dried.
