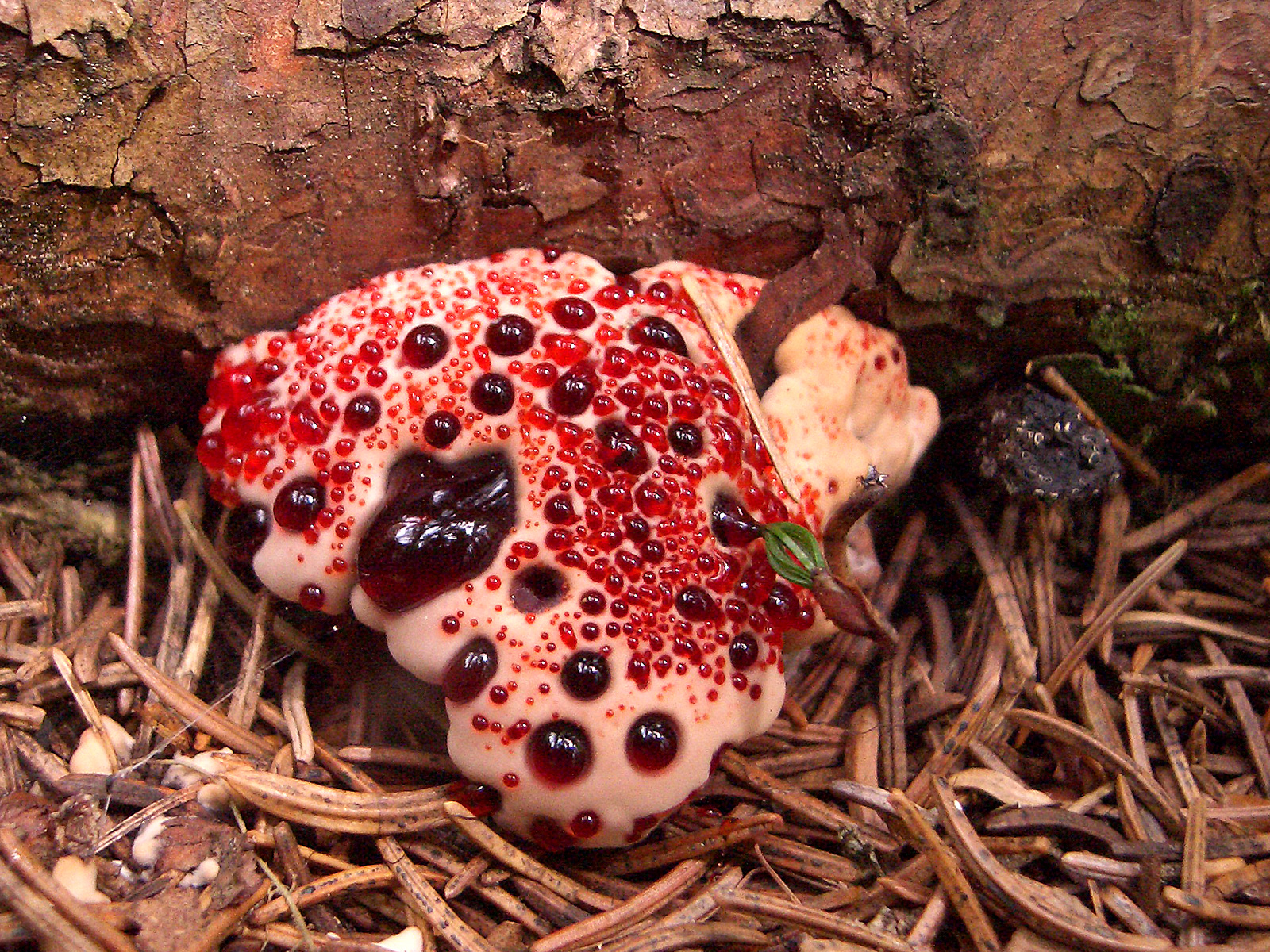
- The bleeding tooth fungus – Hydnellum peckii

Scientific classification
- Kingdom: Fungi
- Division: Basidiomycota
- Class: Agaricomycetes
- Order: Thelephorales
- Family: Bankeraceae
- Genus: Hydnellum; P.Karst. (1879)

Type species
- Hydnellum suaveolens Scop. : Fr. (1772)

Synonyms
- Calodon Quél. ex P.Karst. (1881); Phaeodon J.Schröt. (1888)

= Hydnellum =

Genus of fungi in the family Bankeraceae

Hydnellum is a genus of tooth fungi in the family Bankeraceae (order Thelephorales). Widely distributed in the Northern Hemisphere, the genus contains around 120 species. The fruitbodies of its members grow by slowly enveloping nearby bits of grass and vegetation. There is great variability in the form of Hydnellum fruitbodies, which are greatly influenced by environmental conditions such as rainfall and humidity, drying winds, and temperature. They are too tough and woody to eat comfortably. Several species have become the focus of increasing conservation concern following widespread declines in abundance.

Hydnellum species produce pigments that have been used to dye textiles. Several chemical compounds—some with unique biological activity—have been isolated and identified from the genus.

One of the better-known species is the unusual pinkish-white Hydnellum peckii, also known as "strawberries and cream" or as the "bleeding tooth fungus" due to the red droplets that appear on the pinkish or whitish fruitbodies. Another species, H. suaveolens, has a strong odor of anise or peppermint.

== Taxonomy ==
Hydnellum was circumscribed by Finnish mycologist Petter Adolf Karsten in 1879 with what was then known as Hydnum suaveolens as the type species. Before then, fungi with spines (hydnoid fungi) had been grouped in Hydnum by Elias Fries in his 1821 work Systema mycologicum. Karsten defined Hydnellum as having fruitbodies with a corky or leathery, tough cap, and a centrally attached stipe. Synonyms of Hydnellum include Calodon (Karsten, 1881), and Phaeodon (Joseph Schröter, 1888).

Hydnellum is classified in the family Bankeraceae, which was circumscribed by Marinus Anton Donk in 1961. The genus was not in Donk's original family concept, which included only Bankera and Phellodon, genera whose species produce hyaline (translucent), and ornamented spores. Donk left Hydnellum in the tribe Hydnelleae of the family Thelephoraceae, along with Sarcodon and Hydnodon. In 1981, however, Walter Jülich emended Donk's concept of the Bankeraceae, adding hydnoid genera that produced brown, lobed spores—Hydnellum and Sarcodon.

The name originates from the Greek word ύδνο (=hydnum) meaning "spongy plant" or "fungus". The British Mycological Society, in their recommended list of common names for fungi in the United Kingdom, name Hydnellum fungi in the form "descriptor word" plus "tooth", such as "gold tooth" (H. auratile), "zoned tooth" (H. concrescens), and "velvet tooth" (H. spongiosipes).

== Phylogeny ==
Phylogenetic studies have shown that, in its current circumscription, the genus Hydnellum is polyphyletic and only distantly related to the white-spored genera Bankera and Phellodon, currently grouped together in the family Bankeraceae. Analyses of the ITS region by Parfitt and colleagues and Ainsworth and colleagues, have further revealed multiple cryptic lineages within the genus. Most of the cryptic species belong to the H. concrescens/H. scrobiculatum species complex, resulting in frequent misinterpretations of these old and widely applied names. At the moment, the number of phylogenetically distinct lineages confirmed by molecular sequencing exceeds the number of described taxa in the genus, making further taxonomic revisions inevitable in the future.

== Morphology ==
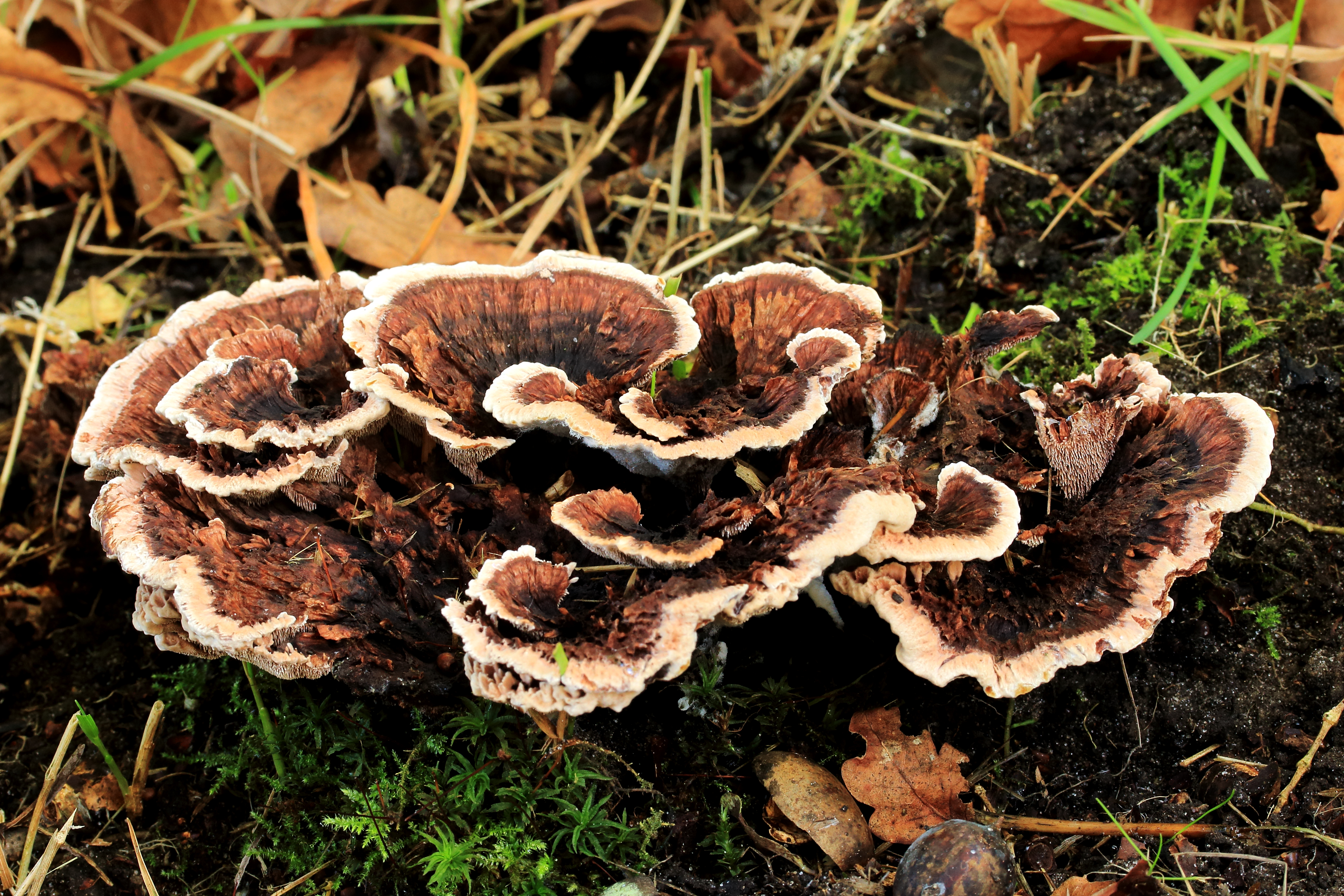
The caps of some Hydnellum species (H. concrescens pictured) can fuse together during growth.

Hydnellum fruitbodies have caps and stipes, often with indeterminant growth forms, that may grow in spurts and decay over several weeks. Neighboring fruitbodies can coalesce, forming intricately intertwined caps and partially fused stipes. The flesh has a zoned appearance and is fibrous when fresh, but becomes hard and woody when dry. Zones in the flesh reflect differences in growth during periods of low daytime and high nighttime humidity, and give a fairly accurate record of daily growth. The spines are crowded closely together and are typically decurrent (extending down the length of the stipe). Fruitbodies may display a variety of colors, from white to yellow, olive green, shades of orange, light brown, or dark brown in age.

Spores of Hydnellum are almost spherical to oblong and tuberculate, and are brown in mass. The basidia (spore-bearing cells) are narrowly club-shaped and usually four-spored; there are no cystidia in Hydnellum. Three types of hyphae are found in the flesh of Hydnellum: generative hyphae (thin-walled, not inflated); skeletal hyphae (thick-walled and narrow); and thin-walled gloeoplerous-like hyphae, which stain with methyl blue.

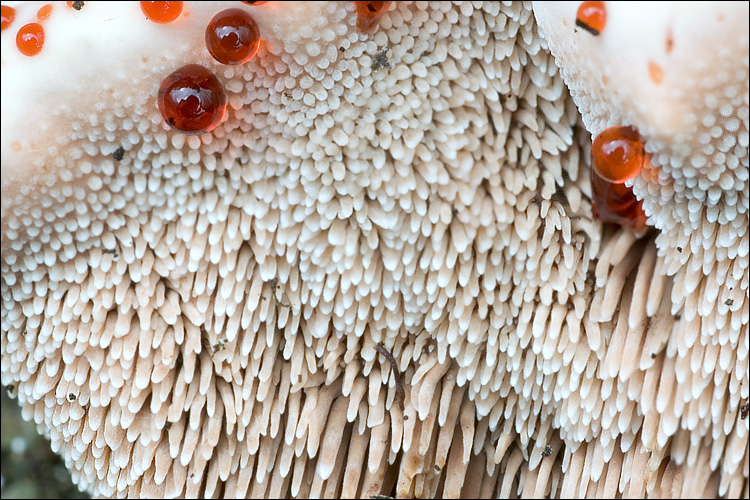
Spines of H. ferrugineum

In conditions of high humidity, several species can form striking colored drops on the actively growing caps: red drops in H. peckii, H. diabolus, H. ferrugineum, and H. cruentum, yellow drops in H. caeruleum, and coffee-colored drops in H. mirabile. The common names of H. peckii reflect its appearance: "strawberries and cream" and "bleeding tooth fungus". Some Hydnellum species have a mealy odor (e.g. H. mirabile and H. pineticola) similar to freshly ground flour. H. zonatum smells like melilot, while H. suaveolens has a sweet odor resembling anise or peppermint. All are too tough and woody to be edible, and many have an acrid taste anyway.

Differences between Hydnellum species tend to be more distinguishable in younger specimens. Fruitbody development is greatly influenced by environmental factors such as levels of rainfall, drying winds, and temperature. The blue tooth (H. caeruleum), for example, develops a deeper blue color when it grows during cooler autumn weather. Optimal growth occurs during periods of frequent light rains and high humidity; if the habitat dries out, growth will stop, but may resume after further precipitation. This intermittent growth affects the fruitbodies of different species to variable extents, leading to large variations in form, surface texture, and color. The morphological variability of fruitbodies and the dependence of their appearance upon environmental conditions has made Hydnellum a difficult group to study. Canadian mycologist Kenneth A. Harrison, who described several new species from North America, noted "[t]he remarkable longevity of individual sporophores of many species and the changes in appearance that occur during the long period of their development have confused all workers studying this group." For example, H. aurantiacum, initially white, becomes in turn shades of orange, rusty-brown, and brownish-black. Its fruitbody initially has a turbinate (cushion-like) shape with a lumpy surface, later becoming flattened to funnel-shaped with a smooth to corrugated surface texture.

Immature fruitbodies

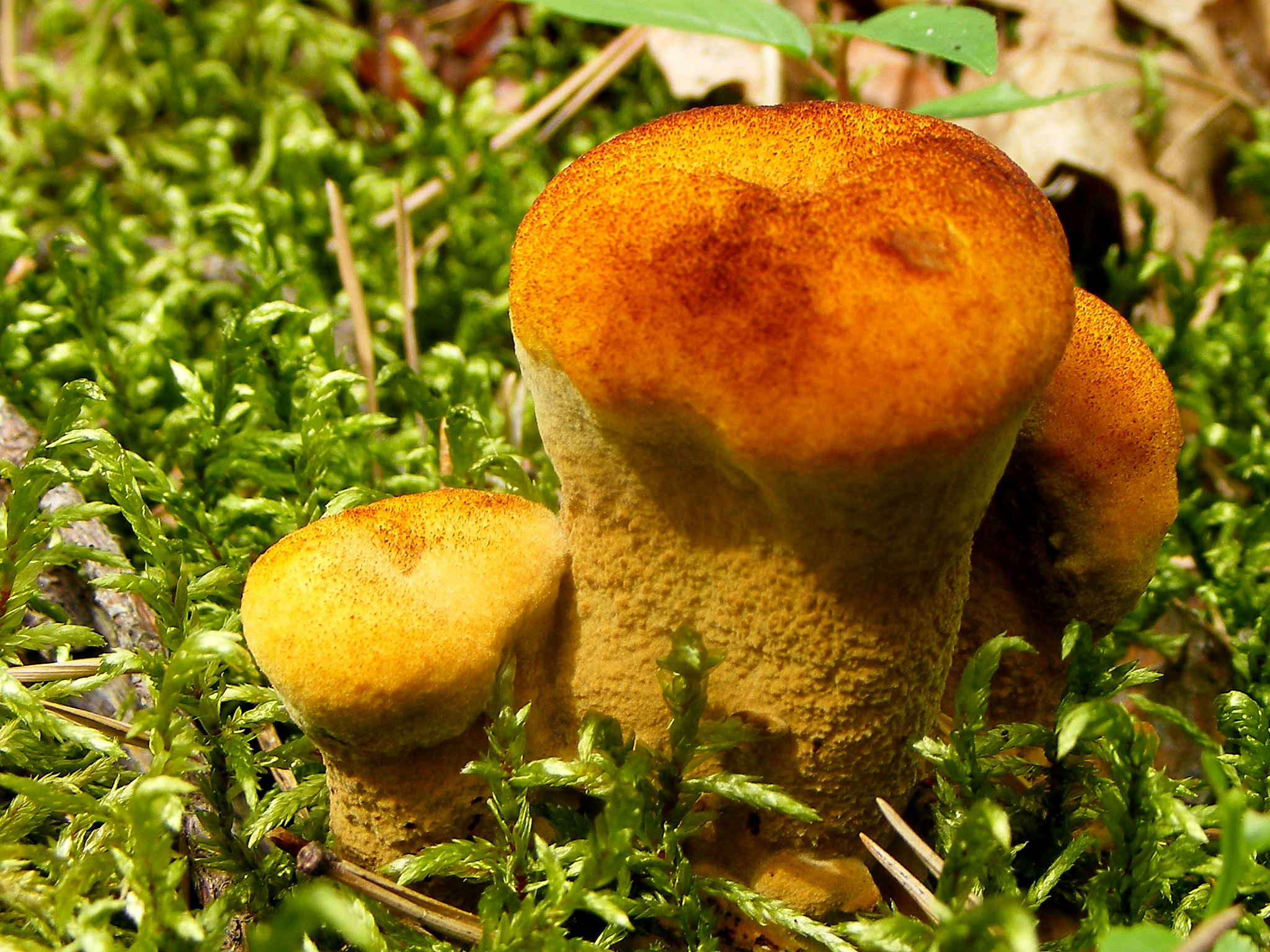
H. compactum

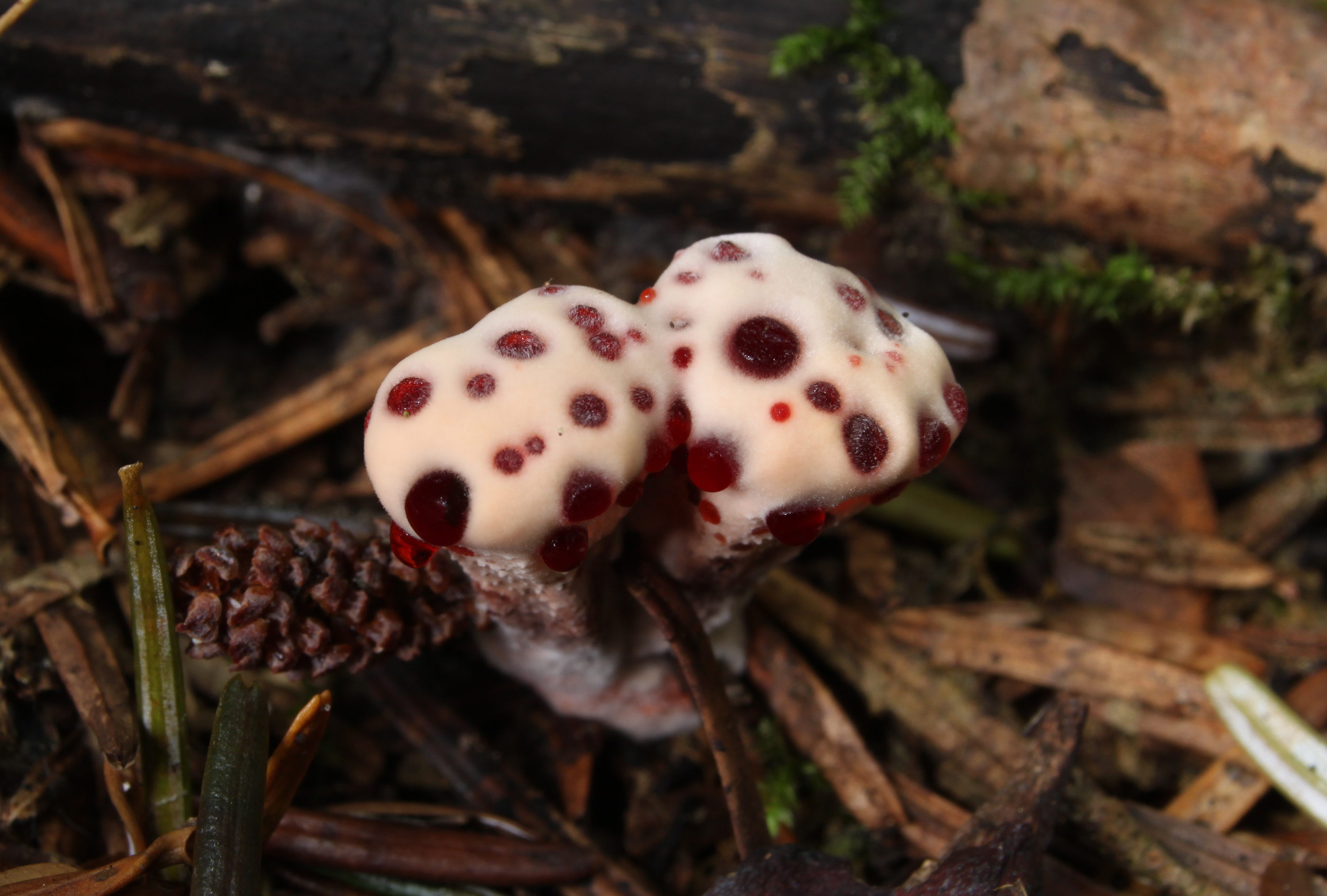
H. peckii

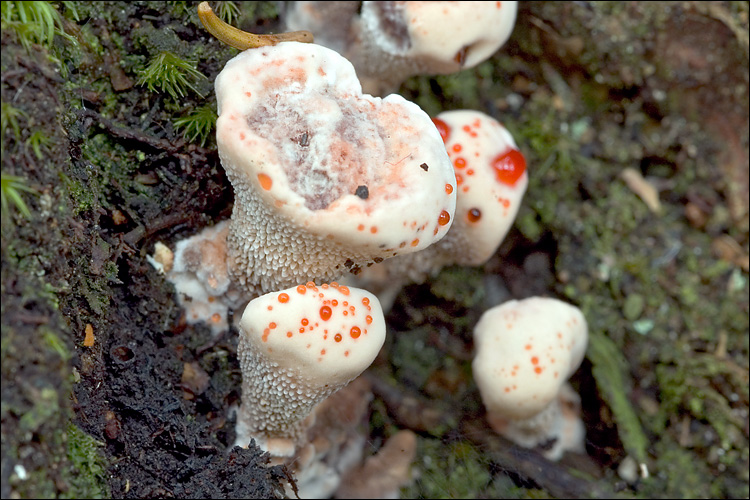
H. ferrugineum

The caps form from the top of the short stipe by the growth and expansion of a blunt margin and later as a thickening of the upper surface. Spines start to form when the cap hangs over the stipe slightly. They are white in many species, but become brown in maturity as the brown-colored spores accumulate on the surface.

== Habitat and distribution ==
Hydnellum fungi are mycorrhizal, and are usually found in coniferous and mixed woods. Favored tree hosts include members of the Fagaceae and the Pinaceae. The genus is widely distributed in the Northern Hemisphere, particularly Europe and North America, but some species are also found in tropical Asia. Harrison identified a dozen new species from North America in the 1960s. Rudolph Arnold Maas Geesteranus recognized 16 European species in his 1975 treatment of the genus, to which H. dianthifolium has been recently added by Loizides and colleagues.

Some Hydnellum species, including H. ferrugineum and H. scleropodium, form a tough mat of mycelia in the humus and upper soil of pine forests. This mycelial mat grows larger with old trees, and can cover an area of several square meters. These areas generally lack dwarf shrubs and promote the vigorous growth of mosses; reindeer lichens often occur in the center of large mats. The presence of the fungus changes the nature of the soil, resulting in a thinner humus layer, decreased groundwater penetration, decreased soil pH, and increases in the level of root respiration as well as the quantity of roots. The fungus also decreases the organic carbon and nitrogen concentrations. Soil with the mycelium becomes more podzolized than the surrounding soil.

== Conservation ==
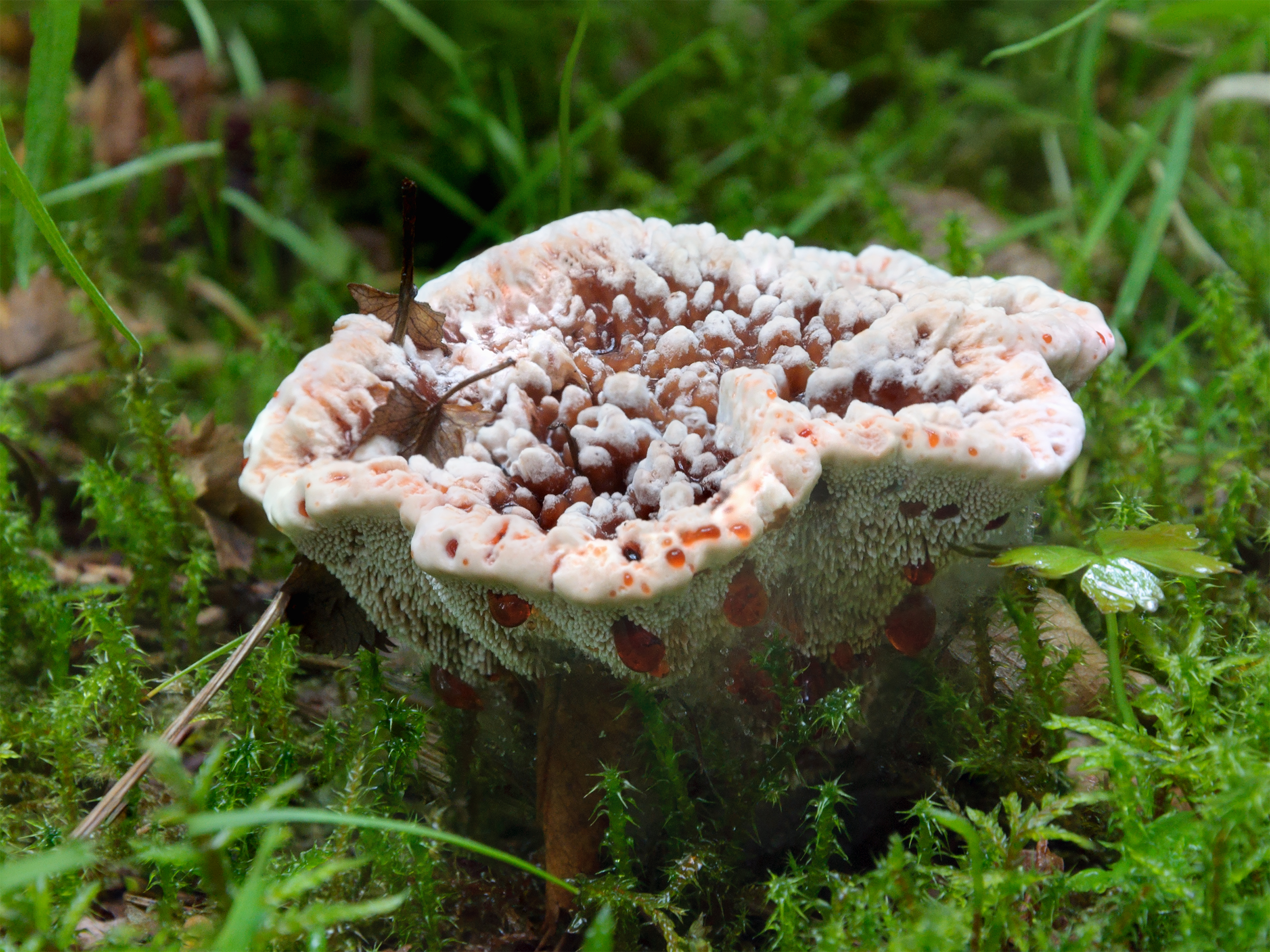
Hydnellum ferrugineum is of conservation concern in Europe.

Some Hydnellum species have been shown to be in decline in Europe, including the Czech Republic, the Netherlands, Norway, and Scotland. In the United Kingdom, several are listed in the biodiversity action plan for stiped hydnoid fungi: H. aurantiacum is classified as critically endangered; H. caeruleum, H. ferrugineum are listed as endangered, while H. concrescens, H. spongiosipes, H. peckii, and H. scrobiculatum are considered vulnerable. H. ferrugineum and H. peckii are sensitive to the increased nitrogen deposition resulting from clear-cutting, a forestry practice used in some areas of Europe.

Conservation efforts for Hydnellum are hindered by the fact that some species are difficult to discriminate in the field, making it hard to determine an appropriate conservation status. Techniques based on species-specific PCR primers and DNA extraction from soil have been developed to detect the mycelia of various Hydnellum species without having to rely on the presence of fruitbodies, which may help conservation efforts as well as improve understanding of below-ground ecology. Similar techniques have been used to show that, in the case of H. aurantiacum and H. caeruleum, the fungus can persist below the ground for at least four years without producing fruitbodies.

== Bioactive compounds ==
Structural formula of the anticoagulant and antibacterial compound atromentin, found in H. peckii

Several chemical compounds—some with unique biological activity—have been isolated and identified from Hydnellum species. For example, Hydnellum peckii contains atromentin, a pigment with anticoagulant properties similar to heparin. Atromentin also possesses antibacterial activity, inhibiting the enzyme enoyl-acyl carrier protein reductase (essential for the biosynthesis of fatty acids) in the bacteria Streptococcus pneumoniae.

Some species are used as dyes. Hydnellum caeruleum, used in North America and Scandinavia to dye silk and wool, produces a range of colors including tan, blue, and forest-green, depending on the mordant that is used. Hydnellum peckii produces gray, brown, and olive colors. Hydnuferrugin and hydnuferruginin are pigments responsible for the coloration of H. ferrugineum and H. zonatum. Geogenin is a yellow pigment found in H. geogenium.

Thelephoric acid is present in several Hydnellum species. This compound, derived metabolically from the shikimic acid pathway, inhibits the enzyme prolyl endopeptidase, which is involved in deteriorating certain neuropeptides that are believed to contribute to memory and learning. Hydnellum caeruleum and H. concrescens have several para-terphenyl derivatives named thelephantins (specifically, variants thelephantins I–N), some of which can inhibit the enzyme alpha-glucosidase. The compounds hydnellins A and B are terphenyls found in H. suaveolens and Hydnellum geogerirum. The chemicals responsible for the fragrant anise-like aroma of H. suaveolens have been identified as coumarin and para-anisaldehyde.

== Species ==
Karsten's original 1879 circumscription of Hydnellum contained 19 species. Joost Stalpers included 34 Hydnellum species in his 1993 monograph on the Thelephorales. The tenth edition of the Dictionary of the Fungi (2008) indicated 38 species in the genus. Larsson et al. included 12 species transferred to this genus from Sarcodon in 2019. In 2024, Douch et al. described four more species.

As of August 2025, Index Fungorum lists approximately 120 species of Hydnellum. Some of the species are listed below.

Image	Name	Distribution
	Hydnellum amygdaliolens (Rubio Casas, Rubio Roldán & Català) E.Larss., K.H.Larss. & Kõljalg	Europe
	Hydnellum aurantiacum (Batsch) P.Karst. (1879)	Asia, Europe, North America
	Hydnellum auratile (Britzelm.) Maas Geest. (1959)	Europe, North America
	Hydnellum caeruleum (Hornem.) P.Karst. (1879)	Asia, Europe, North America
	Hydnellum chrysinum K.A.Harrison (1964)	North America
	Hydnellum coactum (Y.H. Mu & H.S. Yuan) Della Magg. (2023)	China
	Hydnellum coalitum Maas Geest. (1975)	Europe
	Hydnellum compactum (Pers.) P.Karst. (1879)	Europe
	Hydnellum complicatum Banker (1906)	North America
	Hydnellum concrescens (Pers.) Banker (1906)	Asia, Europe, North America
	Hydnellum conigenum (Peck) Banker (1906)	North America
	Hydnellum cristatum (Bres.) Stalpers (1993)	Europe, North America
	Hydnellum cruentum K.A.Harrison (1961)	Nova Scotia, Canada
	Hydnellum crustulinum Maas Geest. (1971)	Punjab, India
	Hydnellum cumulatum K.A.Harrison (1964)	Europe, North America
	Hydnellum cyanodon K.A.Harrison (1964)	North America
	Hydnellum cyanopodium K.A.Harrison (1964)	North America
	Hydnellum dianthifolium Loizides, Arnolds & P.-A. Moreau (2016)	Southern Europe
	Hydnellum earlianum Banker (1906)	North America
	Hydnellum fennicum (P.Karst.) E.Larss., K.H.Larss. & Kõljalg	Europe
	Hydnellum ferrugineum (Fr.) P.Karst. (1879)	North Africa, Asia, Europe, North America
	Hydnellum floriforme (Schaeff.) Banker (1906)	North America
	Hydnellum fraudulentum Maas Geest. (1971)	Australia
	Hydnellum frondosum K.A.Harrison (1961)	Nova Scotia, Canada
	Hydnellum fuligineoviolaceum (Kalchbr.) E.Larss., K.H.Larss. & Kõljalg	Europe
	Hydnellum fuscoindicum (K.A.Harrison) E.Larss., K.H.Larss. & Kõljalg	North America
	Hydnellum gatesiae Douch, L.J. Vaughan & T.W. May	Australia
	Hydnellum geogenium (Fr.) Banker (1913)	Europe, North America
	Hydnellum glaucopus (Maas Geest. & Nannf.) E.Larss., K.H.Larss. & Kõljalg	Europe
	Hydnellum gracilipes (P.Karst.) P.Karst. (1879)	Europe
	Hydnellum grosselepidotum Y.H. Mu & H.S. Yuan (2020)	China
	Hydnellum hangzhouense (X.P. Fan, Y.F. Sun & B.K. Cui)	Eastern China
	Hydnellum joeides (Pass.) E.Larss., K.H.Larss. & Kõljalg	Europe, North America
	Hydnellum lepidum (Maas Geest.) E. Larss., K.H.Larss. & Kõljalg	Europe
	Hydnellum lidongensis (Y.H. Mu & H.S. Yuan) Della Magg. (2023)	China
	Hydnellum longidentatum Coker (1939)	United States
	Hydnellum lundellii (Maas Geest. & Nannf.) E.Larss., K.H.Larss. & Kõljalg	Europe
	Hydnellum martioflavum (Snell, K.A.Harrison & H.A.C.Jacks.) E.Larss., K.H.Larss. & Kõljalg	Europe, North America
	Hydnellum mirabile (Fr.) P.Karst. (1879)	Europe, North America
	Hydnellum multiceps K.A.Harrison (1961)	Nova Scotia, Canada
	Hydnellum nigellum K.A.Harrison (1964)	North America
	Hydnellum nothofagacearum Douch & J.A. Cooper	New Zealand
	Hydnellum papuanum Maas Geest. (1971)	Papua New Guinea
	Hydnellum parvum Banker (1913)	North America
	Hydnellum peckii Banker (1912)	Europe, North America
	Hydnellum pseudoioeides Douch & J.A. Cooper	Oceania
	Hydnellum regium K.A.Harrison (1964)	North America
	Hydnellum rickeri Banker (1913)	North America
	Hydnellum scabrosum (Fr.) E.Larss., K.H.Larss. & Kõljalg	Europe
	Hydnellum scleropodium K.A.Harrison (1964)	North America
	Hydnellum scrobiculatum (Fr.) P.Karst. (1879)	Asia, Europe, North America
	Hydnellum septentrionale K.A.Harrison (1964)	North America
	Hydnellum singeri Maas Geest. (1969)	Colombia
	Hydnellum spongiosipes (Peck) Pouzar (1960)	Europe, North America
	Hydnellum staurastrum Maas Geest. (1971)	Malaysia
	Hydnellum suaveolens (Scop.) P.Karst. (1879)	Asia, Europe, North America
	Hydnellum subzonatum K.A.Harrison (1961)	Nova Scotia, Canada
	Hydnellum tardum Maas Geest. (1975)	Europe
	Hydnellum underwoodii (Banker) E.Larss., K.H.Larss. & Kõljalg	North America
	Hydnellum variisporum Douch, Robinson & L.J. Vaughan	Australia
	Hydnellum versipelle (Fr.) E.Larss., K.H.Larss. & Kõljalg	Europe, North America
