= Hydnellum chrysinum =

Scientific classification
- Domain: Eukaryota
- Kingdom: Fungi
- Division: Basidiomycota
- Class: Agaricomycetes
- Order: Thelephorales
- Family: Bankeraceae
- Genus: Hydnellum
- Species: H. chrysinum

Binomial name
- Hydnellum chrysinum K.A.Harrison (1964)

Species of fungus

Hydnellum chrysinum is a tooth fungus in the family Bankeraceae. It was described as new to science in 1964 by Canadian mycologist Kenneth A. Harrison. The fungus is found in the Annapolis Valley of Nova Scotia, where it fruits under red pine (Pinus resinosa).
