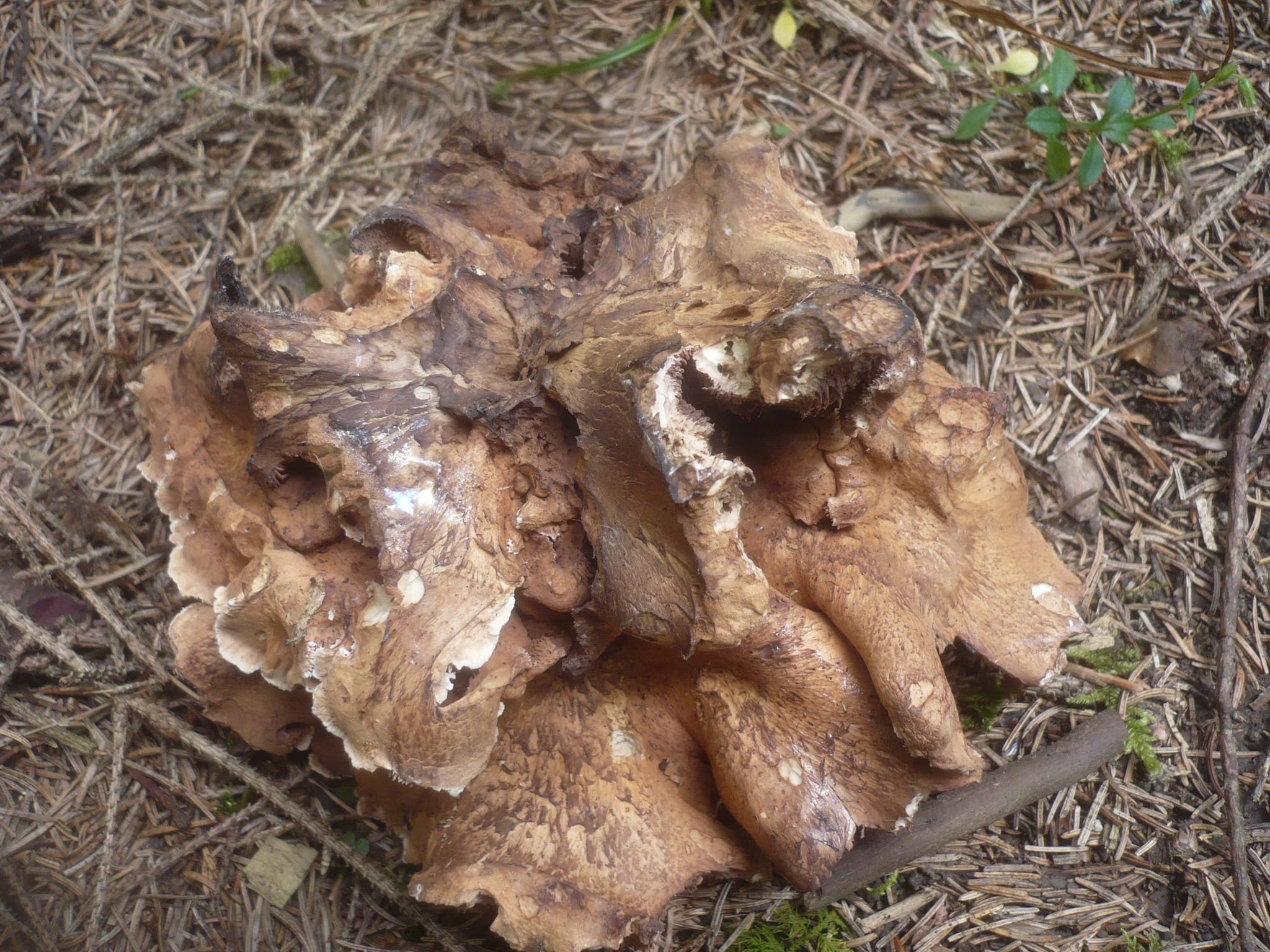

Scientific classification
- Domain: Eukaryota
- Kingdom: Fungi
- Division: Basidiomycota
- Class: Agaricomycetes
- Order: Thelephorales
- Family: Bankeraceae
- Genus: Hydnellum
- Species: H. versipelle

Binomial name
- Hydnellum versipelle (Fr.) E.Larss., K.H.Larss. & Kõljalg

Synonyms
- Hydnum versipelle Fr. (1861); Hydnum suave Bres. (1884); Phaeodon versipellis (Fr.) Henn. (1898); Hydnum versipelle var. suave (Bres.) Trotter (1925); Hydnum crassum K.A.Harrison (1961); Sarcodon versipellis (Fr.) Nikol. (1961)

= Hydnellum versipelle =

Species of fungus

Hydnellum versipelle is a species of tooth fungus in the family Bankeraceae. It was originally described by Elias Fries in 1861 as Hydnum versipelle. Taisiya Lvovna Nikolayeva transferred it to the genus Sarcodon in 1961. Hydnum crassum, published by Kenneth A. Harrison in 1961, is a synonym. The species is found in Europe and North America.
