= Hydnellum subzonatum =

Scientific classification
- Domain: Eukaryota
- Kingdom: Fungi
- Division: Basidiomycota
- Class: Agaricomycetes
- Order: Thelephorales
- Family: Bankeraceae
- Genus: Hydnellum
- Species: H. subzonatum

Binomial name
- Hydnellum subzonatum K.A.Harrison (1961)

Species of fungus

Hydnellum subzonatum is a tooth fungus in the family Bankeraceae. Found in Nova Scotia, Canada, it was described as new to science in 1961 by mycologist Kenneth A. Harrison. Its small fruitbodies grow as fused caps, with individual caps measuring 1.3–5 cm (1–2 in) in diameter. Initially white, they turn light brown with a somewhat darker center, and are faintly zonate (with a pattern of rings). The grayish-blue spines on the cap underside are up to 3 mm long. Growing fruitbodies have an unusual hoary (grayish-white) appearance. The spores are oblong to almost square, measuring 3.5–4.5 by 3.4 μm. The fungus fruits in groups under spruce. H. subzonatum has been collected from Cape Split and Antigonish County.
