= Hydnellum complicatum =

Scientific classification
- Kingdom: Fungi
- Division: Basidiomycota
- Class: Agaricomycetes
- Order: Thelephorales
- Family: Bankeraceae
- Genus: Hydnellum
- Species: H. complicatum

Binomial name
- Hydnellum complicatum Banker (1906)

Synonyms
- Hydnum complicatum (Banker) Sacc. & Trotter (1912); Hydnellum carolinianum Coker (1919)

Species of fungus

Hydnellum complicatum is a tooth fungus in the family Bankeraceae. Found in North America, it was described as new to science by mycologist Howard James Banker in 1906 from collections made in New York. Banker, who described the fruitbody as "irregular and complicated", considered it closely related to H. floriforme, differing in its reddish color and smaller spores.
