= Hydnellum conigenum =

Scientific classification
- Domain: Eukaryota
- Kingdom: Fungi
- Division: Basidiomycota
- Class: Agaricomycetes
- Order: Thelephorales
- Family: Bankeraceae
- Genus: Hydnellum
- Species: H. conigenum

Binomial name
- Hydnellum conigenum (Peck) Banker (1906)

Synonyms
- Hydnum conigenum Peck (1903)

Species of fungus

Hydnellum conigenum, commonly known as the funnel hydnum, is a species of tooth fungus in the family Bankeraceae found in North America. It was first described in 1903 by American mycologist Charles Horton Peck from collections made growing on fallen cones of ponderosa pine, near the base of the Moscow Mountains (Moscow, Idaho). Peck thought it was similar to H. aurantiacum, differing in its smaller size, more slender stipe, non-zoned flesh, more even cap, and somewhat unusual substrate. Howard James Banker transferred it to the genus Hydnellum in 1906. Its range extends from New Mexico to British Columbia and the Great Lakes region, where it grows in coniferous forests.
