= Hydnellum nigellum =

Scientific classification
- Domain: Eukaryota
- Kingdom: Fungi
- Division: Basidiomycota
- Class: Agaricomycetes
- Order: Thelephorales
- Family: Bankeraceae
- Genus: Hydnellum
- Species: H. nigellum

Binomial name
- Hydnellum nigellum K.A.Harrison (1964)

Synonyms
- Sarcodon nigellus (K.A.Harrison) Maas Geest. (1974)

Species of fungus

Hydnellum nigellum is a tooth fungus in the family Bankeraceae. Found in Nova Scotia, Canada, where it grows under spruce, it was described as new to science in 1964 by Canadian mycologist Kenneth A. Harrison. The fruitbodies of this fungus are small, measuring 3–6 cm (1.2–2.4 in) in diameter, and black.
