= Hydnellum scleropodium =

Scientific classification
- Domain: Eukaryota
- Kingdom: Fungi
- Division: Basidiomycota
- Class: Agaricomycetes
- Order: Thelephorales
- Family: Bankeraceae
- Genus: Hydnellum
- Species: H. scleropodium

Binomial name
- Hydnellum scleropodium K.A.Harrison (1964)

Species of fungus

Hydnellum scleropodium is a rare species of tooth fungus in the family Bankeraceae. It was described as new to science in 1964 by Canadian mycologist Kenneth A. Harrison. The fungus has been collected in Tennessee, North Carolina, and Nova Scotia, in both mixed and coniferous forest. Its fruitbody has an irregular, brownish cap measuring 10–25 cm (4–10 in) wide. The sclerotium-like stipe measures 3–9 cm (1.2–3.5 in) long by 2–4 cm (0.8–1.6 in) thick, and roots into the ground. The flesh has a strong, fragrant odor. Spines on the cap underside, blue in color, are up to 11 mm long.
