= Hydnellum earlianum =

Scientific classification
- Domain: Eukaryota
- Kingdom: Fungi
- Division: Basidiomycota
- Class: Agaricomycetes
- Order: Thelephorales
- Family: Bankeraceae
- Genus: Hydnellum
- Species: H. earlianum

Binomial name
- Hydnellum earlianum Banker (1906)

Synonyms
- Hydnum earlianum (Banker) Sacc. & Trotter (1912)

Species of fungus

Hydnellum earlianum, commonly known as Earl's hydnum, is a tooth fungus in the family Bankeraceae found in North America. It was described as new to science in 1906 by Howard James Banker from collections originally made in Georgia. The specific epithet honors mycologist Franklin Sumner Earle, "whose excellent field notes have frequently aided in the discrimination of species in this family".
