= Hydnellum variisporum =

Scientific classification
- Domain: Eukaryota
- Kingdom: Fungi
- Division: Basidiomycota
- Class: Agaricomycetes
- Order: Thelephorales
- Family: Bankeraceae
- Genus: Hydnellum
- Species: H. variisporum

Binomial name
- Hydnellum variisporum Douch, Robinson & L.J. Vaughan

Species of fungus

Hydnellum variisporum is a species of mushroom in the family Bankeraceae. It was described by James K. Douch, Richard Robinson, and Luke J. Vaughan in 2024. The specific epithet refers to variability observed in the spores. The type locality is Denmark, Western Australia.

== See also ==
- Fungi of Australia
