= Hydnellum lundellii =

Scientific classification
- Kingdom: Fungi
- Division: Basidiomycota
- Class: Agaricomycetes
- Order: Thelephorales
- Family: Bankeraceae
- Genus: Hydnellum
- Species: H. lundellii

Binomial name
- Hydnellum lundellii (Maas Geest. & Nannf.) E.Larss., K.H.Larss. & Kõljalg (2019)

Synonyms
- Sarcodon lundellii Maas Geest. & Nannf. (1969)

Species of tooth fungus

Hydnellum lundellii is a species of tooth fungus in the family Bankeraceae, first described in 1969 and reclassified to its current genus in 2019. The fungus produces woody fruit bodies with caps ranging from yellowish-brown to purplish-brown that can grow up to 9 cm across, featuring tooth-like spines on their underside that release spores. It forms a mycorrhizal relationship with spruce trees. The species is found exclusively in Fennoscandia.

== Taxonomy ==
The fungus was described as new to science in 1969 by the mycologists Rudolph Arnold Maas Geesteranus and John Axel Nannfeldt; the type specimen was collected in Sweden. The taxon was transferred to Hydnellum in 2019 following molecular analysis of various hydnoid fungi.

== Description ==
Hydnellum lundellii produces woody fruit bodies (basidiocarps) that may occur singly or clustered, sometimes fused at the base. The cap (or pileus) can grow up to 9 cm across and ranges in colour from yellowish‑brown to reddish or purplish‑brown, often bearing scattered darker scales. On the underside, numerous downward‑pointing spines (up to 4 mm long) develop, turning purplish‑brown as they mature; these tooth‑like projections release the spores. The cap surface is scaly toward the centre but becomes smooth or slightly velvety (velutinate) towards the margin, which may remain covered in fine fibres (fibrillose). The flesh (context) is whitish to pale brown, becoming darker close to the base of the stem, and the odour is only faintly farinaceous (reminiscent of fresh meal).

The stipe reaches up to 8 cm in height and about 2 cm in thickness. It is initially covered in a fine, downy layer (tomentose) that soon sloughs off to leave a smooth surface matching the cap's hue. Under microscopic examination, the cap tissue consists of simple‑septate hyphae up to 20 μm wide. The spores (basidiospores) are pale brown, irregular in outline and measure about 5–5.8 by 3.6–4.2 μm.

== Habitat and distribution ==
Hydnellum lundellii is only known to occur in Fennoscandia, where it form ectomycorrhizae with Picea trees.
