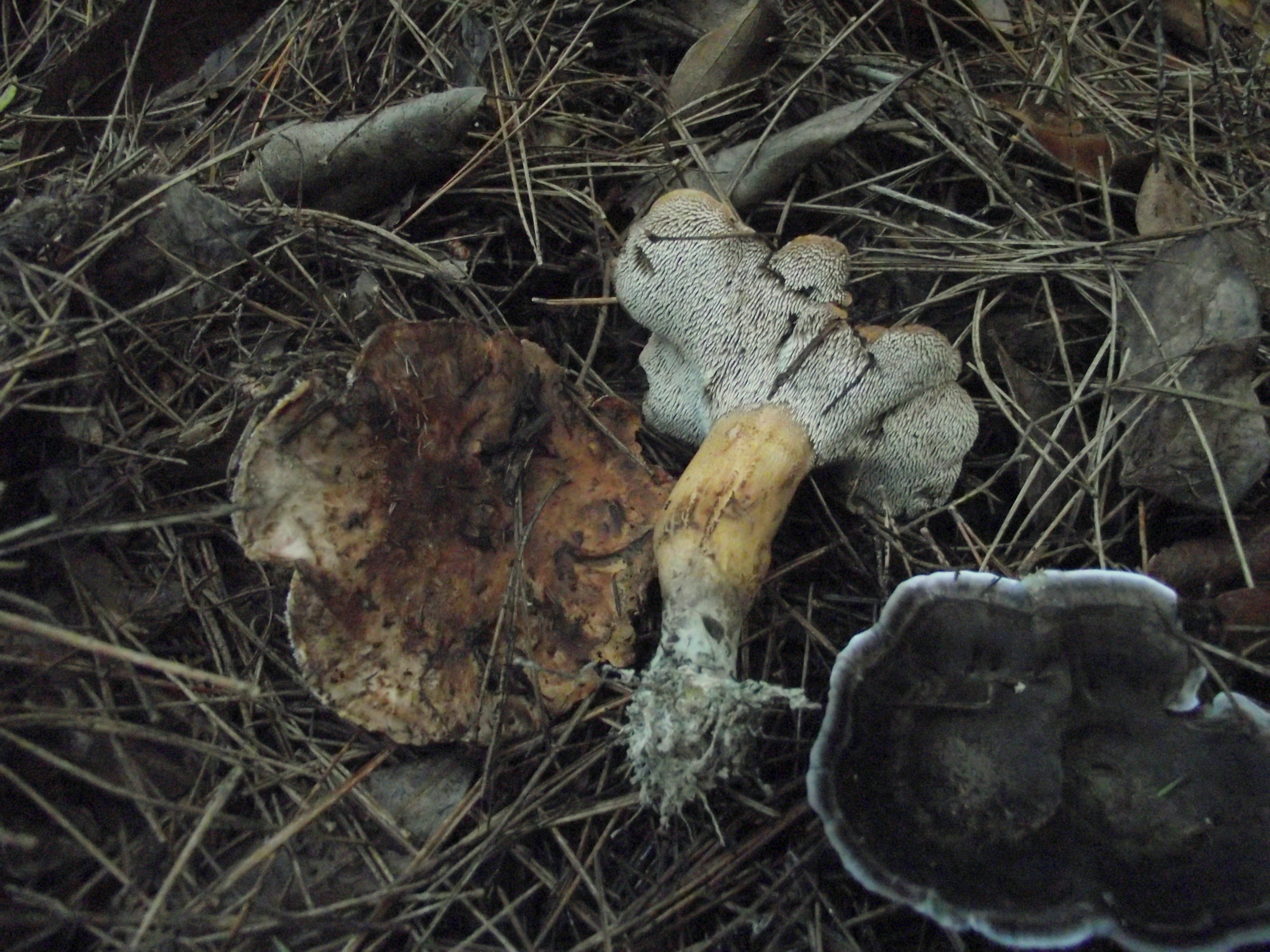

Scientific classification
- Domain: Eukaryota
- Kingdom: Fungi
- Division: Basidiomycota
- Class: Agaricomycetes
- Order: Thelephorales
- Family: Bankeraceae
- Genus: Hydnellum
- Species: H. amygdaliolens

Binomial name
- Hydnellum amygdaliolens (Rubio Casas, Rubio Roldán & Català) E.Larss., K.H.Larss. & Kõljalg (2019)

Synonyms
- Sarcodon amygdaliolens Rubio Casas, Rubio Roldán & Català (2011)

= Hydnellum amygdaliolens =

Species of mushroom-forming fungus

Hydnellum amygdaliolens is a species of tooth fungus in the family Bankeraceae, found in the Iberian Peninsula. It is characterised by its yellowish-brown to cinnamon-coloured caps, which can reach 20 cm across, and its distinctive intense bitter-almond smell. The fungus grows in association with pine trees on acidic soils and was first described from Spain in 2011.

== Taxonomy ==
The species was described from specimens collected in Tamajón (Guadalajara, Spain) on 5 December 2009 under pine and rockrose on acidic quartzite gravels. The epithet amygdaliolens derives from the Latin amygdala ('almond') and olens ("smelling"), referring to its intense bitter‑almond odour. It was initially classified in the genus Sarcodon.

The taxon was reclassified in the genus Hydnellum in 2019, following molecular phylogenetics analysis of the nuclear LSU and ITS regions of several taxa from the stipitate hydnoid genera Hydnellum and Sarcodon.

== Description ==
The fruit bodies are medium to large, club‑shaped basidiocarps (cap and stem fused), 75–200 mm across, often lobed or irregular in outline. The pileus (cap) surface is finely felted to smooth, cracking into shallow plates but without erect scales, and ranges from yellowish‑brown to cinnamon or beige, typically darker when wet. The edge is initially slightly inrolled and sterile. The stipe is stout (35–60 by 22–40 mm), simple or branched, with spines (aculei) up to 10 mm long that run partly down the stipe. The spines are whitish at first, becoming brownish towards the base. The flesh is thick—brittle in the cap, fibrous in the stem—and displays a vivid greenish‑blue reaction with potassium hydroxide (KOH), turning orange with time. The taste is extremely bitter and often tingling; the hymenium (spore‑bearing surface) emits a characteristic intense bitter‑almond aroma shortly after collection.

Microscopically, the hyphal system is monomitic (only generative hyphae, without clamp connections). Basidia are four‑spored, more or less cylindrical to club‑shaped, 27–34 by 5–6 micrometres] (μm). Spores are somewhat spherical (globose) to ellipsoid, ornamented with nodules or warts, 5.25–6.5 by 4–5 μm (including ornamentation), each containing a single oil drop. Gloeocystidia (oil-containing cystidia) occur abundantly in the cap cuticle.

== Habitat and distribution ==
Sarcodon amygdaliolens is known from scattered Mediterranean climate localities throughout the Iberian Peninsula, fruiting in autumn and winter (November–December). It grows terrestrially under conifers—predominantly maritime pine (Pinus pinaster), but also Scots pine (P. sylvestris) and stone pine (P. pinea)—on acidic, siliceous soils derived from quartzite, schist or granite. Recorded provinces include Guadalajara, Valencia, Cádiz, Cuenca, Salamanca, Badajoz and Almería. Its preference for acid soils and pine stands, combined with the bitter taste and almond scent, make it readily recognised in the field.
