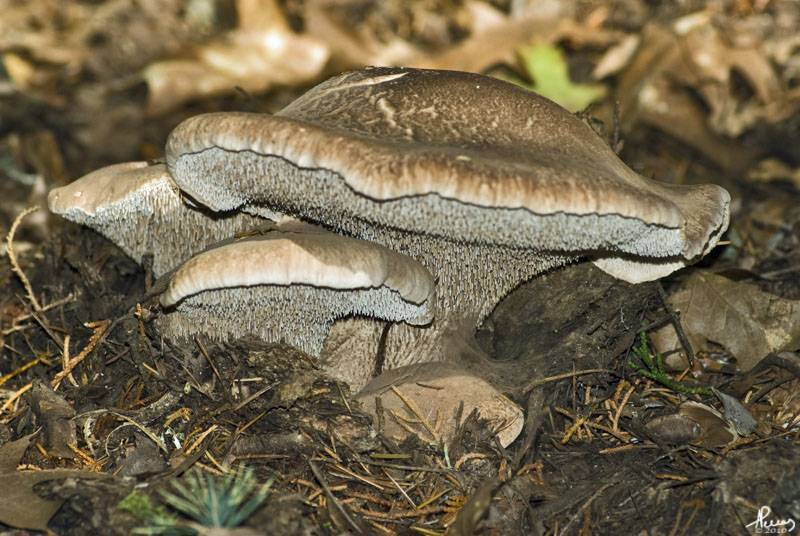

Scientific classification
- Domain: Eukaryota
- Kingdom: Fungi
- Division: Basidiomycota
- Class: Agaricomycetes
- Order: Thelephorales
- Family: Bankeraceae
- Genus: Hydnellum
- Species: H. glaucopus

Binomial name
- Hydnellum glaucopus (Maas Geest. & Nannf.) E.Larss., K.H.Larss. & Kõljalg (2019)

Synonyms
- Sarcodon glaucopus Maas Geest. & Nannf. (1969)

= Hydnellum glaucopus =

Species of tooth fungus

Hydnellum glaucopus is a species of tooth fungus in the family Bankeraceae, first described as a new species in 1969 and reclassified to its current genus in 2019. The fungus produces firm, woody fruit bodies with caps reaching up to 10 cm across that range in colour from yellowish-brown to purplish-brown, featuring tooth-like spines on their underside that mature from white to pale purplish-brown. Its flesh is primarily whitish with a yellow tint, turning distinctively greyish-green at the base of the stipe, and contains compounds called glaucopins. The species forms mycorrhizal partnerships with coniferous trees and is widespread across Europe, extending northward into Scandinavia.

== Taxonomy ==
The species was described as new to science in 1969 by the mycologists Rudolph Arnold Maas Geesteranus and John Axel Nannfeldt. It was reclassified in the genus Hydnellum in 2019.

== Description ==
Hydnellum glaucopus produces firm, woody basidiocarps that occur singly or in small groups. The cap (pileus) may reach up to 10 cm across and is at first covered with a fine, downy layer (tomentose), later becoming dull and smooth; scales may persist around the margin. Its colour varies from yellowish‑brown through vinaceous to purplish‑brown. On the underside, a dense array of tooth‑like spines (the hymenophore) up to 5 mm long bears the spore‑producing surface; these spines start white and mature to a pale purplish‑brown. The flesh (context) is chiefly whitish with a slight yellow tint, turning greyish‑green at the base of the stem, and imparts a distinctly bitter taste when sampled.

The stalk (stipe) grows to about 7 cm in height and 4 cm in width. It is initially clothed in matted fibres (fibrillose) which soon smooth away, the surface shifting from whitish to pinkish‑brown, with the basal region often tinged greenish‑white. Under the microscope, the cap tissue comprises simple‑septate hyphae up to 20 μm wide. The pale‑brown basidiospores are ornamented with spines or low crests and measure approximately 5.4–6 by 4–4.5 μm.

Fruit bodies of H. glaucopus contain cyathane diterpenes called glaucopins that have anti-inflammatory activity in laboratory tests.

== Habitat and distribution ==
Hydnellum glaucopus forms an ectomycorrhizal association—a mutually beneficial partnership between its fungal filaments and the roots of coniferous trees—typically fruiting on the forest floor among needle litter and moss. The species is widespread across Europe, with its range extending northward into Scandinavia; scattered occurrences have been recorded as far north as Finnmark in northern Norway. It is considered vulnerable in Switzerland.
