= Hydnellum tardum =

Scientific classification
- Domain: Eukaryota
- Kingdom: Fungi
- Division: Basidiomycota
- Class: Agaricomycetes
- Order: Thelephorales
- Family: Bankeraceae
- Genus: Hydnellum
- Species: H. tardum

Binomial name
- Hydnellum tardum Maas Geest. (1975)

Species of fungus

Hydnellum tardum is a tooth fungus in the family Bankeraceae. Found in Europe, it was described as new to science in 1975 by Dutch mycologist Rudolph Arnold Maas Geesteranus, from collections made in coniferous forest in what was then known as West Germany.
