= Hydnellum crustulinum =

Scientific classification
- Domain: Eukaryota
- Kingdom: Fungi
- Division: Basidiomycota
- Class: Agaricomycetes
- Order: Thelephorales
- Family: Bankeraceae
- Genus: Hydnellum
- Species: H. crustulinum

Binomial name
- Hydnellum crustulinum Maas Geest. (1971)

Species of fungus

Hydnellum crustulinum is a tooth fungus in the family Bankeraceae. Found in Punjab, India, it was described as new to science in 1971 by Dutch mycologist Rudolph Arnold Maas Geesteranus.
