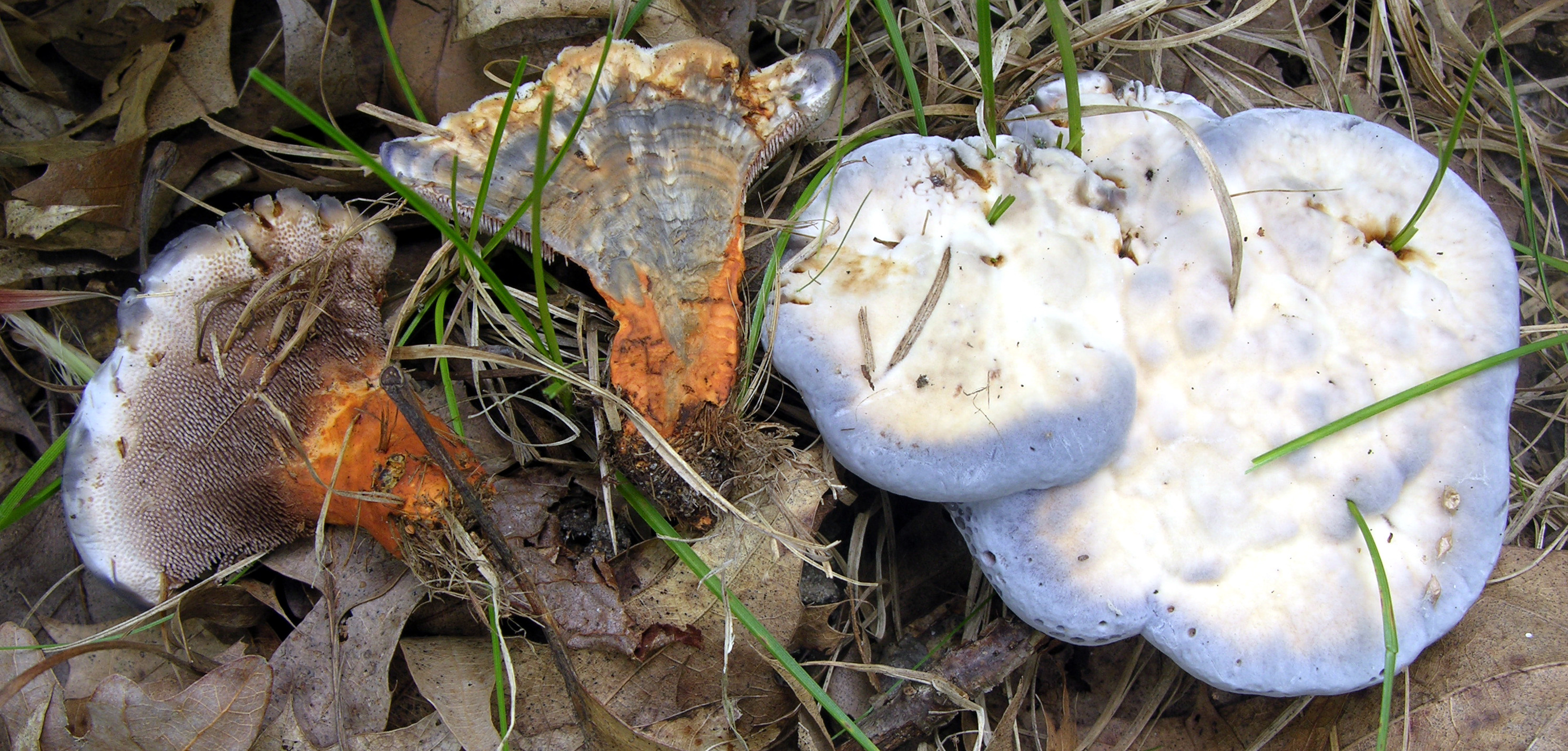

Scientific classification
- Kingdom: Fungi
- Division: Basidiomycota
- Class: Agaricomycetes
- Order: Thelephorales
- Family: Bankeraceae
- Genus: Hydnellum
- Species: H. caeruleum

Binomial name
- Hydnellum caeruleum Karsten

= Hydnellum caeruleum =

Species of fungus

Hydnellum caeruleum
- Mycological characteristics
- Teeth on hymenium
- Cap is flat
- Hymenium is decurrent
- Stipe is bare
- Spore print is brown
- Ecology is mycorrhizal
- Edibility is inedible

Hydnellum caeruleum, commonly known as the blue-gray hydnellum, blue-green hydnellum, blue spine, blue tooth, or bluish tooth, is an inedible fungus found in North America, Europe, and temperate areas of Asia.

The young caps have shades of blue, gray and brown, with light blue near the margin. The stem is orange to brown. The flesh is blue to black in the cap, and red to brownish in the stem. The blue hues tend to fade with age.

Hydnellum aurantiacum is very similar to mature specimens but differs in color. H. suaveolens is similar, with mostly blue flesh and odour of anise.

== Taxonomy ==
Hydnellum caeruleum (Hornem.) P. Karst was first discovered by Jens Wilken Hornemann under the Swedish mycologist Elias Magnus Fries in 1825 and later added to the genus Hydnellum in 1879 by Finnish mycologist Petter Adolf Karsten.

Some past synonyms for the species include Hydnum cyaneotinctum (found in Orris Island, ME, 1903) and Hydnellum/Hydnum/Sarcodon alachuanum (found in Alachua, FL, 1940).

== Description ==
H. caeruleum belongs to a historic group of stipitate hydnoid fungi or 'stalked-tooth fungi' due to its morphological appearance with a cap, woody stipe, and distinct toothed hymenium. The fruiting body can be single or fuse with other bodies (called “confluence”) into gregarious or concrescent sporocarps. Due to this growth pattern, twigs and leaves can sometimes become engulfed into the flesh.

The species has a whitish-blue cap, or pileus, which can be convex to planar in shape and is around 8 cm broad. The cap is tomentose, meaning that small dense hairs can make it feel velvety to the touch. The fungus is zonate, with concentric bands of color sometimes apparent on its cap, ranging from white, to grayish violet, to pastel blue zones. When bruised, flesh stains dark inky blue. Similarly, the inner flesh of the fungus appears blue when cut and dulls into a dark gray-blue when dry.

Pale white or gray spines (3-6mm in length) cover the decurrent toothed hymenium on the stipe and underside of the cap. Older samples may have teeth that have turned brown to dark brown. Stipe is central and terete in shape, meaning that it is cylindrical and tapers in width. The base of the stipe is more bulbous and sometimes has an orange coloration.

Climate effects can impact the coloration and defining characteristics of this fungus. During periods of high humidity, H. caeruleum can develop yellow liquid drops on actively growing pilei. Additionally, cool late-September temperatures can lead the fungus to develop deeper blue colors during this time.

=== Microscopic features ===
H. caeruleum produces brownish basidiospores which are subglobose, or not quite spherical. The basidiospores are 5–6.2 x 4.5–5.5 μm in size with tuberculate ornamentation. Small spore sizes in this genera mean that the tubercles can only be investigated under electron microscopy. H. caeruleum spores investigated by Grand & Van Dyke had a high tendency of dichotomously branched tubercles, or two tubercles that arose from the same area.

The species has a monomitic hyphal system. Simple-septa generative hyphae makes up the tissues and is rarely found with clamp connections. Basidia are clavate with four sterigmata.

=== Similar species ===
H. caeruleum can be discerned from the macroscopically similar H. suaveolens species based on microscopic features, though their odors are a useful way to identify the species in the field. H. caeruleum has a farinaceous, starchy odor, while H. suaveolens has a minty, fragrant odor.

== Ecology ==
Hydnellum caeruleum is mycorrhizal and often found in the humus beneath conifer trees.

H. caeruleum is an ectomycorrhizal fungus native to temperate regions of Asia, Europe, and North America. The species is commonly found in pine and spruce ecosystems due to its mycorrhizal relationships with coniferous trees. In these relationships, the fungus receives nutrients from the tree and in turn assists the plant in water and mineral uptake. Therefore, it is speculated that this fungus holds important impacts for the field of forestry.

A study from 2012 suggests that stipitate hydnoid fungi such as H. caeruleum can remain in soils 1-4 years after their sporocarps are gone due to persistent below-ground mycelium. This persistence of vegetal mycelium was more important for the survival of the species than the production of sporocarps for sexual reproduction, suggesting that sporocarps may only form under specific advantageous conditions.

A study on stipitate hydnoid fungi in Scottish coniferous forests, which focused on the conservation status and distribution of fungi in these habitats, discovered H. caeruleum making an interesting ectomycorrhizal association. H. caeruleum made an association with an heather shrub (Arctostaphylos uva-ursi) in a treeless site, indicating that the fungus may be able to switch hosts from coniferous trees to shrub species. The study suggested that this finding is important for the field of fungi and tree conservation, as H. caeruleum could survive even after a deforestation event and assist in the eventual reforestation of its habitat.

== Relevance to humans ==
While the fungus is not edible for humans, H. caeruleum’s unique coloration makes it a prized species for mushroom dyers. The fungus can create blue, green, and brown dyes depending on the mordant that is used. Additionally, some bioactive compounds have been isolated from the species including the p-terphenyl compound Aurantiacin and six p-terphenyl derivatives named thelephantins I–N with a known compound, dihydroaurantiacin dibenzoate.
