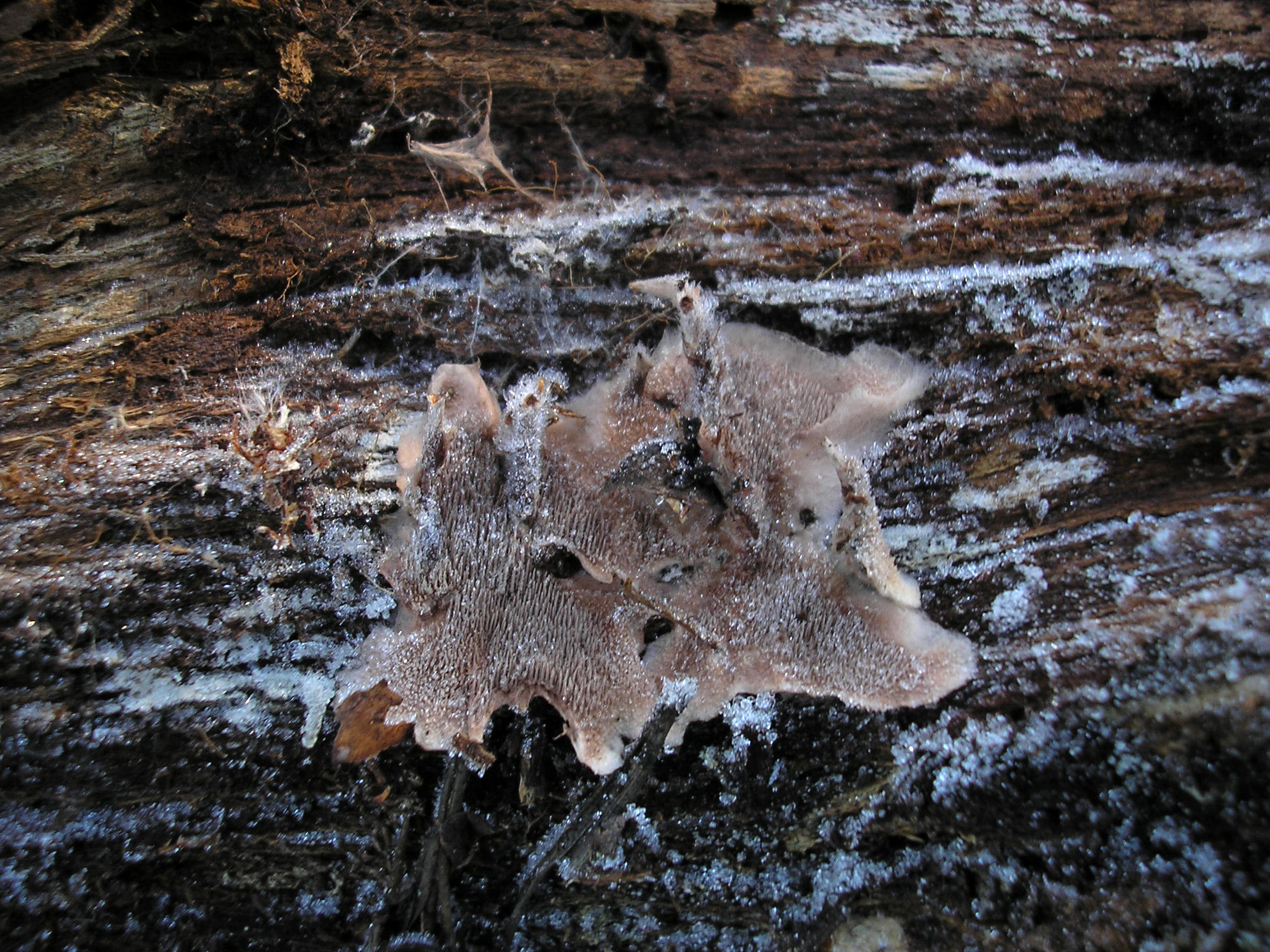

Conservation status
- Vulnerable (IUCN 3.1)

Scientific classification
- Kingdom: Fungi
- Division: Basidiomycota
- Class: Agaricomycetes
- Order: Thelephorales
- Family: Bankeraceae
- Genus: Hydnellum
- Species: H. gracilipes

Binomial name
- Hydnellum gracilipes (P.Karst.) P.Karst. (1879)

Synonyms
- Hydnum gracilipes P.Karst. (1866); Calodon gracilipes (P.Karst.) P.Karst. (1881)

= Hydnellum gracilipes =

Species of mushroom-forming fungus

Hydnellum gracilipes is a species of tooth fungus in the family Bankeraceae. Fruit bodies of the fungus have a pinkish to reddish-brown colour, a delicate texture described as "felty or papery", and flimsy stipes. H. gracilipes is found in northern Europe, where it is mycorrhizal with pine.

== Taxonomy ==
The fungus was first described scientifically in 1886 by the Finnish mycologist Petter Karsten, who called it Hydnum gracilipes. He transferred it to the genus Hydnellum in 1879.

== Description ==
Hydnellum gracilipes forms small, stalked fruit bodies (basidiocarps) with caps (pilei) up to 3 mm across. Young caps are clothed in fine hairs (tomentose), giving them a velvety feel; as they mature these hairs wear off and the surface becomes dull and smooth (glabrous). The overall tone is a pale purplish‑brown, tending toward a more yellowish shade at the centre. On the underside, short downward‑pointing spines reach up to 2 mm in length; these are initially pale purplish‑brown and deepen slightly in colour as they age. The flesh (context) is very thin—around 1.5 mm thick—and shows a faint two‑layered (duplex) appearance, becoming a gentle purplish‑brown at maturity.

The stem (stipe) measures up to 1.5 cm in height and about 4 mm in thickness. Like the cap, it begins with a fine, hairy covering and later smooths out, retaining the same colour as the pileus. Under the microscope, the hyphae (filamentous cells) are simple septate—meaning each cell is divided by cross‑walls—and range from 2 to 6 μm in width. The spores produced on the spines are small (4.3–4.6 by 2.7–3.6 μm), pale in colour, and ornamented with tiny surface projections, which help in species identification. They are roughly spherical with a diameter of no more than 5 μm.

== Habitat and distribution ==
Hydnellum gracilipes is widely distributed in northern Europe, where it forms ectomycorrhizae with conifers. In Norway, the northern extent of its distribution is in Finnmark. Collections made in Scotland have been found by lifting the dense ground cover of common heather (Calluna vulgaris), which the fungus seems to use to as support to compensate for its flimsy stipe.

== See also ==
- List of fungi by conservation status
