= Hydnellum pseudoioeides =

Scientific classification
- Domain: Eukaryota
- Kingdom: Fungi
- Division: Basidiomycota
- Class: Agaricomycetes
- Order: Thelephorales
- Family: Bankeraceae
- Genus: Hydnellum
- Species: H. pseudoioeides

Binomial name
- Hydnellum pseudoioeides Douch & J.A. Cooper

Species of fungus

Hydnellum pseudoioeides is a species of mushroom in the family Bankeraceae. It was described by James K. Douch and Jerry A. Cooper in 2024. The specific epithet refers to this species' misidentification as H. ioeides. The type locality is Otago Lakes, New Zealand.

== See also ==
- Fungi of Australia
