= Hydnellum coalitum =

Scientific classification
- Domain: Eukaryota
- Kingdom: Fungi
- Division: Basidiomycota
- Class: Agaricomycetes
- Order: Thelephorales
- Family: Bankeraceae
- Genus: Hydnellum
- Species: H. coalitum

Binomial name
- Hydnellum coalitum Maas Geest. (1975)

Species of fungus

Hydnellum coalitum is a tooth fungus in the family Bankeraceae. Found in Europe, it was described as new to science in 1975 by Dutch mycologist Rudolph Arnold Maas Geesteranus, from collections made in France.
