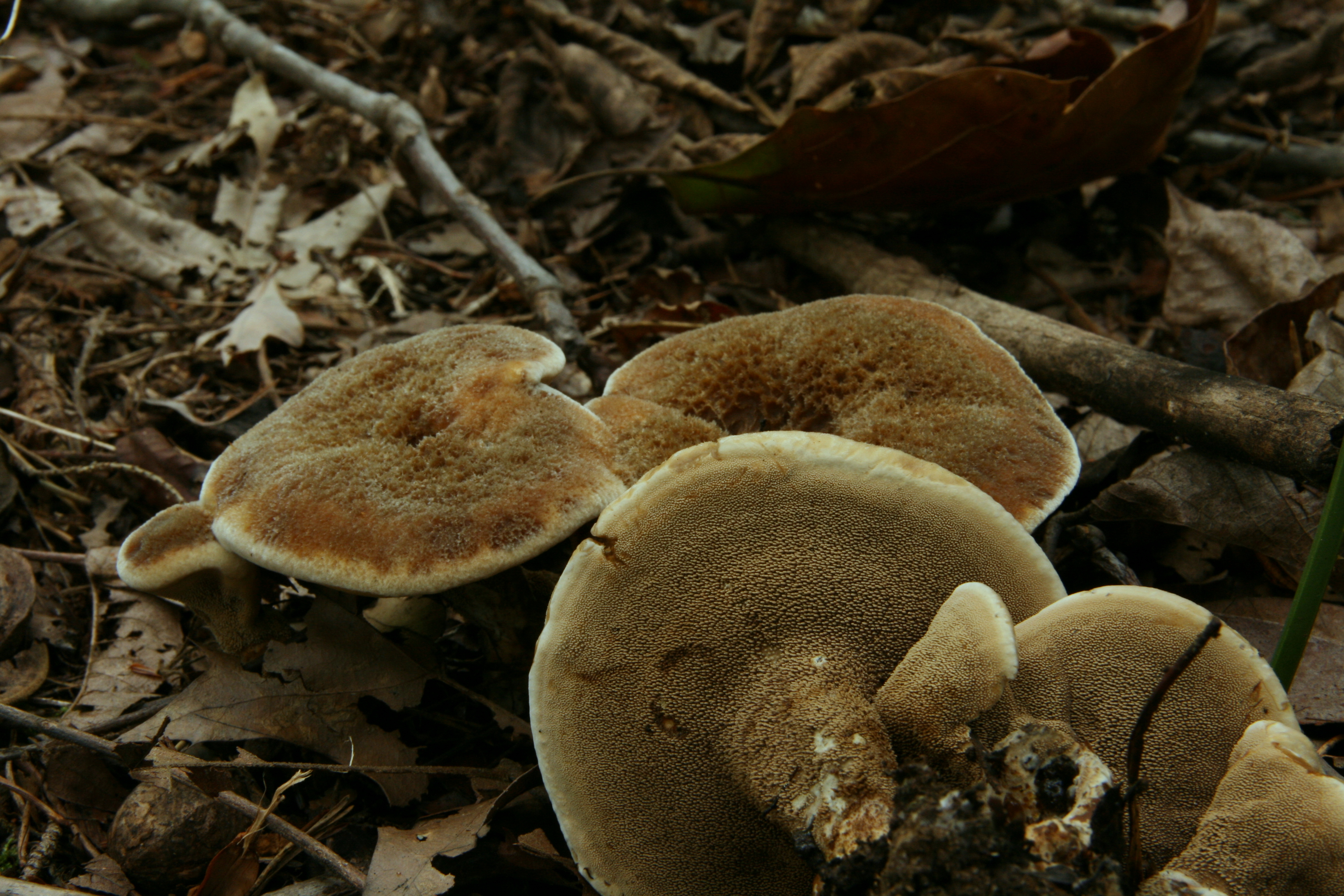

Scientific classification
- Domain: Eukaryota
- Kingdom: Fungi
- Division: Basidiomycota
- Class: Agaricomycetes
- Order: Thelephorales
- Family: Bankeraceae
- Genus: Hydnellum
- Species: H. cristatum

Binomial name
- Hydnellum cristatum (Bres.) Stalpers (1993)

Synonyms
- Hydnum cristatum Bres. (1902); Sarcodon cristatus (Bres.) Coker (1939)

= Hydnellum cristatum =

Species of fungus

Hydnellum cristatum is a tooth fungus in the family Bankeraceae found in Europe and North America. It was originally described as a species of Hydnum by Italian mycologist Giacomo Bresadola in 1902. Joost Stalpers transferred it to the genus Hydnellum in 1993.
