= Hydnellum gatesiae =

Scientific classification
- Domain: Eukaryota
- Kingdom: Fungi
- Division: Basidiomycota
- Class: Agaricomycetes
- Order: Thelephorales
- Family: Bankeraceae
- Genus: Hydnellum
- Species: H. gatesiae

Binomial name
- Hydnellum gatesiae Douch, L.J. Vaughan & T.W. May

Species of fungus

Hydnellum gatesiae is a species of mushroom in the family Bankeraceae. It was described by James K. Douch, Luke J. Vaughan, and Tom W. May in 2024. The specific epithet refers to Genevieve M. Gates, who collected all specimens used in the species description. The type locality is Kermandie Falls, Australia.

== See also ==
- Fungi of Australia
