= Hydnellum singeri =

Scientific classification
- Domain: Eukaryota
- Kingdom: Fungi
- Division: Basidiomycota
- Class: Agaricomycetes
- Order: Thelephorales
- Family: Bankeraceae
- Genus: Hydnellum
- Species: H. singeri

Binomial name
- Hydnellum singeri Maas Geest. (1969)

Species of fungus

Hydnellum singeri is a tooth fungus in the family Bankeraceae. Discovered in Colombia, it was described as new to science in 1969 by Dutch mycologist Rudolph Arnold Maas Geesteranus. The specific epithet honors Rolf Singer.
