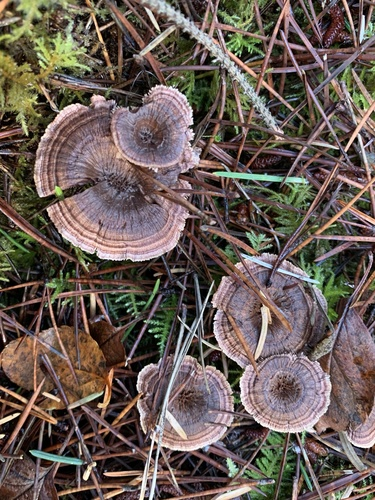

Scientific classification
- Kingdom: Fungi
- Division: Basidiomycota
- Class: Agaricomycetes
- Order: Thelephorales
- Family: Bankeraceae
- Genus: Hydnellum
- Species: H. staurastrum

Binomial name
- Hydnellum staurastrum Maas Geest., 1971

= Hydnellum staurastrum =

Species of fungus

Hydnellum staurastrum is a tooth fungus in the family Bankeraceae. Found in Malaysia, it was described as new to science in 1971 by Dutch mycologist Rudolph Arnold Maas Geesteranus.
