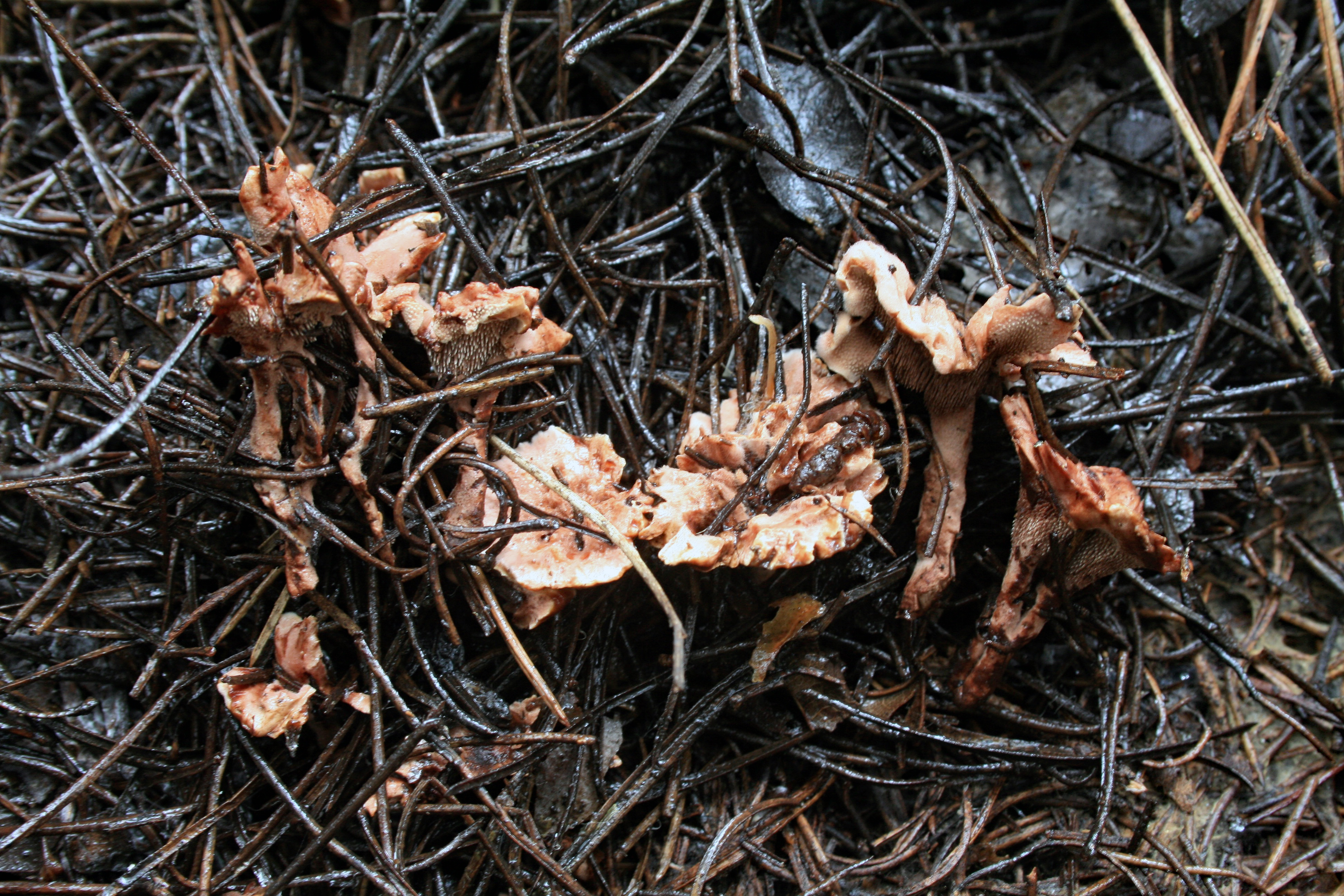

Scientific classification
- Domain: Eukaryota
- Kingdom: Fungi
- Division: Basidiomycota
- Class: Agaricomycetes
- Order: Thelephorales
- Family: Bankeraceae
- Genus: Hydnellum
- Species: H. dianthifolium

Binomial name
- Hydnellum dianthifolium Loizides, Arnolds & P.-A. Moreau (2016)

= Hydnellum dianthifolium =

Species of fungus

Hydnellum dianthifolium is a species of tooth fungus found in the Mediterranean basin. Described as new to science in 2016, this rare species appears to form ectomycorrhizal associations with Pinus brutia and often grows entirely concealed under its thick litter.

The tiny fruitbodies, measuring 1.5–3.5 cm tall by 0.5–2.5 (–3.5) cm across, have a deeply funnel-shaped cap often undulating or splitting radially to acquire a flower- or coral-like shape. It is so far only known from Apulia in southern Italy and the island of Cyprus.
