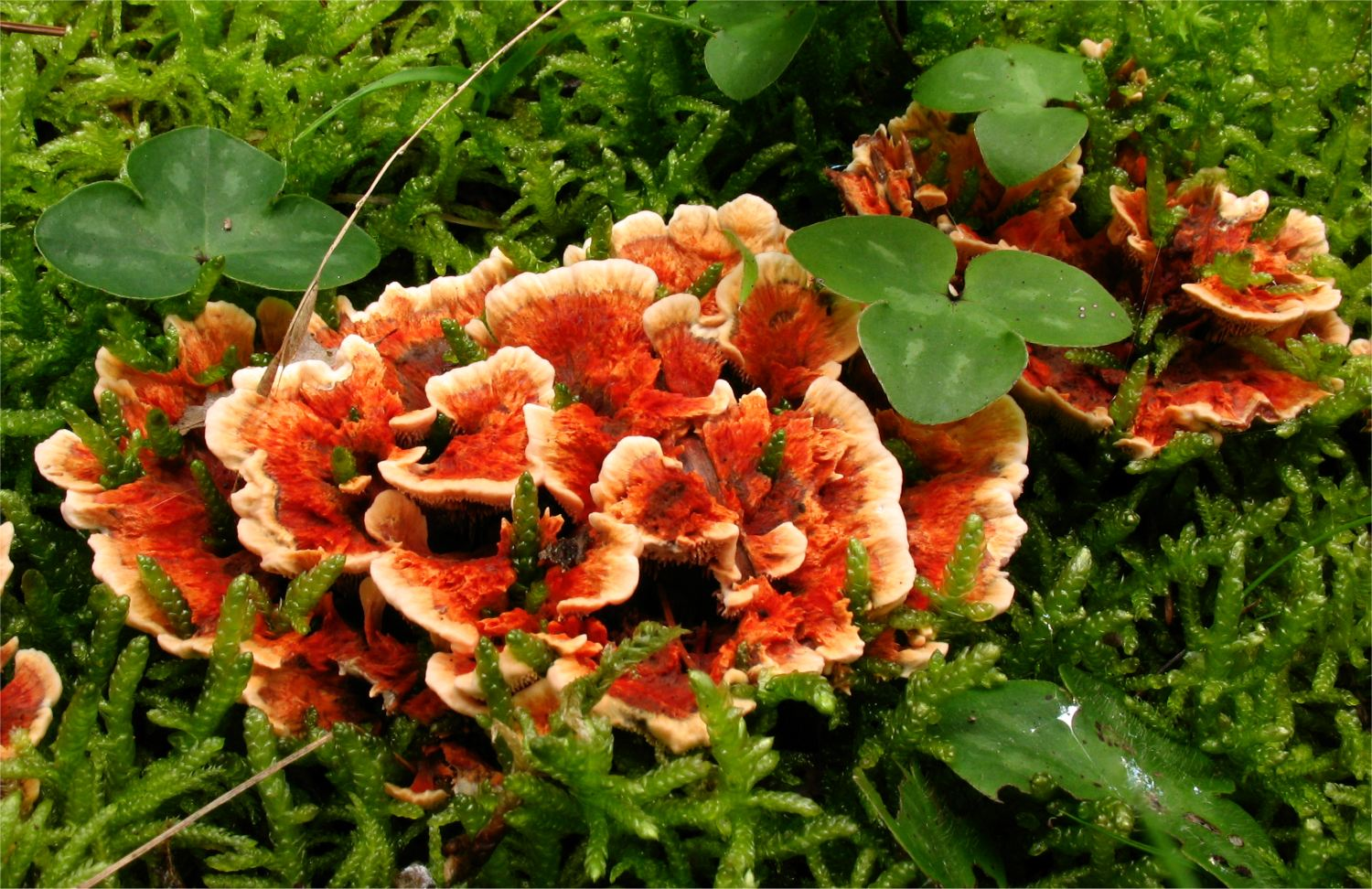

Scientific classification
- Domain: Eukaryota
- Kingdom: Fungi
- Division: Basidiomycota
- Class: Agaricomycetes
- Order: Thelephorales
- Family: Bankeraceae
- Genus: Hydnellum
- Species: H. auratile

Binomial name
- Hydnellum auratile (Britzelm.) Maas Geest. (1959)

Synonyms
- Hydnum auratile Britzelm. (1891)

= Hydnellum auratile =

Species of tooth fungus

Hydnellum auratile is a tooth fungus in the family Bankeraceae, first described by the German mycologist Max Britzelmayr in 1891. The fungus produces distinctive orange to orange-brown fruit bodies with caps up to 5 cm wide that fade to brown with age. It forms ectomycorrhizal associations with both coniferous and deciduous trees, particularly Scots pine and Norway spruce on calcareous soils. Though widely distributed across Europe, parts of Asia, Australia, and North America's Pacific Northwest, H. auratile is considered endangered in Switzerland.

== Taxonomy ==
Hydnellum auratile was first described as a species of Hydnum by German mycologist Max Britzelmayr in 1891. Rudolf Arnold Maas Geesteranus transferred it to Hydnellum in 1959.

== Description ==
The fruit bodies of Hydnellum auratile arise on a distinct stipe and bear a cap up to 5 cm wide, occurring either singly or in crowded groups. Young caps are vivid orange to orange-brown, with a smooth to slightly scaly surface that feels velvety to the touch. As they mature, fine radial hairs develop and the centre often sinks slightly, creating a shallow, funnel-shaped profile. Concentric wrinkles may appear toward the margin, and the cap colour fades to a muted brownish tone. The flesh (context) is thin—usually no more than 2 mm thick—and mirrors the cap's colour transition from bright orange to pale brown.

The stipe reaches about 4 cm in height and 1 cm in width, matching the cap in colour and covered in a similar velvety, felt-like layer of hairs. Under the microscope, the fungus is built of hyphae 2.5–7 μm wide, each separated by simple cross-walls (septa). Its spores are roughly spherical (subglobose), measuring 5–6 × 3.5–4.5 μm, and are ornamented with tiny wart-like projections (tuberculate). In mass, the spores are brown.

The widespread Hydnellum aurantiacum is a close lookalike, but can be distinguished by having a white to buff cap, dull orange to brown flesh, and white spines.

== Habitat and distribution ==
The fungus is widely spread in Europe, and has also been reported from the Pacific Northwest region of North America. It is considered endangered in Switzerland. It forms associations with both coniferous and deciduous trees. It predominantly occurs in calcareous forests, often under Scots pine (Pinus sylvestris) and Norway spruce (Picea abies) on soils derived from limestone, chalk or shell-rich substrates, forming ectomycorrhizal associations with these trees. The species has a broad—but patchy—distribution across the temperate zone of Europe, with confirmed records from France, Italy, Germany, Austria, Switzerland, the Czech Republic, Slovakia, Denmark, Sweden and Finland. Other regions outside Europe where it is known to occur include India, Japan, Australia.
