= Hydnellum fraudulentum =

Scientific classification
- Domain: Eukaryota
- Kingdom: Fungi
- Division: Basidiomycota
- Class: Agaricomycetes
- Order: Thelephorales
- Family: Bankeraceae
- Genus: Hydnellum
- Species: H. fraudulentum

Binomial name
- Hydnellum fraudulentum Maas Geest. (1971)

Species of fungus

Hydnellum fraudulentum is a tooth fungus in the family Bankeraceae. Found in Australia, it was described as new to science in 1971 by Dutch mycologist Rudolph Arnold Maas Geesteranus from collections made in Victoria.
