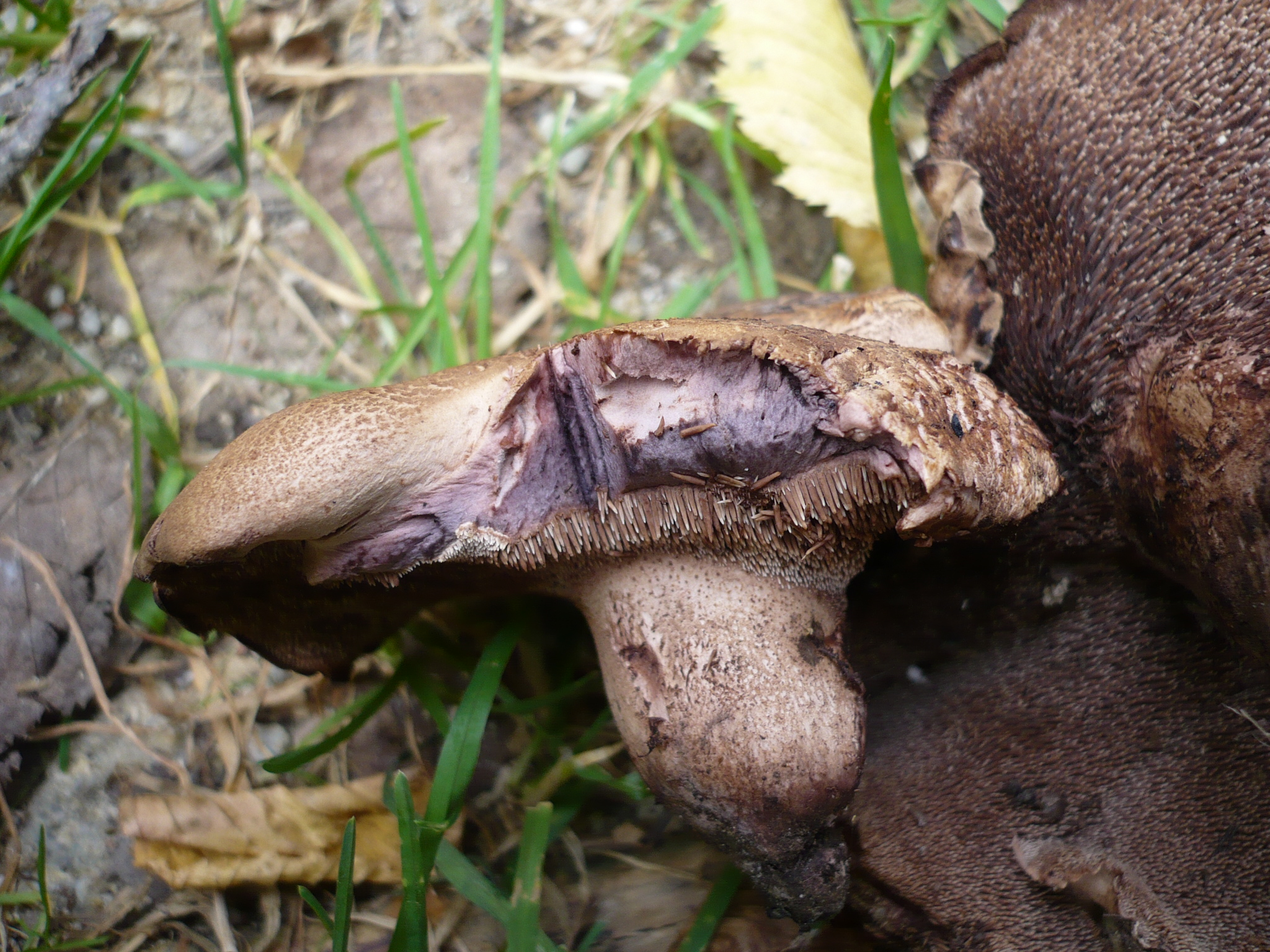

Scientific classification
- Kingdom: Fungi
- Division: Basidiomycota
- Class: Agaricomycetes
- Order: Thelephorales
- Family: Bankeraceae
- Genus: Hydnellum
- Species: H. joeides

Binomial name
- Hydnellum joeides (Pass.) E.Larss., K.H.Larss. & Kõljalg

Synonyms
- Hydnum joeides Pass. (1872); Sarcodon joeides (Pass.) Bataille (1924)

= Hydnellum joeides =

Species of fungus

Hydnellum joeides (the epithet is sometimes spelled ionides or jonides) is a species of tooth fungus in the family Bankeraceae.

== Taxonomy ==
It was first described by Italian botanist Giovanni Passerini in 1872 as Hydnum joeides. Frédéric Bataille transferred it to the genus Sarcodon in 1924.

== Description ==
The fungus makes fruit bodies with flattened to concave caps measuring 2.5–10 cm (1.0–3.9 in) in diameter. They initially have a velvety surface texture that later breaks up into reddish-brown scales. The crowded spines on the cap underside are up to 3 mm long, and are decurrent on the stipe. Initially pale pink, they become brownish in age. Spores are tuberculate (covered in warts), and measure 6.3–7.2 by 4–4.7 μm.

It is reportedly inedible.

== Habitat and distribution ==
The fungus is found in western and central Europe, where it is an ectomycorrhizal symbiont of European beech (Fagus sylvatica), English oak (Quercus robur), and probably sessile oak (Quercus petraea). It is on the red lists of several countries: Flandres, France and Norway (critically endangered); The Netherlands, Germany, Lower Saxony and Switzerland (endangered); and Sweden (vulnerable). Because of the continued decline in sightings in Europe, it has been proposed for inclusion on the IUCN Red List of Threatened Species.

The species has also been reported from the United States, and New Zealand, although mycologist Eef Arnolds regards these records as doubtful because of discrepancies in the reported sizes of the spores.
