= Thelephantins =

Thelephantin A
Thelephantin B
Thelephantin C
Thelephantin D

Identifiers
| CAS Number | A: 522649-86-1; B: 524011-15-2; C: 524011-16-3; D: 610769-60-3; E: 610769-61-4; F: 610769-62-5; G: 610769-63-6 H: 610769-64-7 |
| 3D model (JSmol) | A: Interactive image; B: Interactive image; C: Interactive image; D: Interactive image |
| ChemSpider | A: 4479544; B: 4479545; C: 4479546 |
| PubChem CID | A: 5321927; B: 5321928; C: 5321929; D: 101260622 |
- InChI: A: InChI=1S/C29H24O9/c1-2-3-22(33)37-27-23(16-4-10-19(30)11-5-16)26(35)28(38-29(36)18-8-14-21(32)15-9-18)24(25(27)34)17-6-12-20(31)13-7-17/h4-15,30-32,34-35H,2-3H2,1H3 Key: CNDDIRNNJHDZCC-UHFFFAOYSA-N; B: InChI=1S/C31H28O9/c1-2-3-4-5-24(35)39-29-25(18-6-12-21(32)13-7-18)28(37)30(40-31(38)20-10-16-23(34)17-11-20)26(27(29)36)19-8-14-22(33)15-9-19/h6-17,32-34,36-37H,2-5H2,1H3 Key: PVJPNBBVZSBLLI-UHFFFAOYSA-N; C: InChI=1S/C32H30O9/c1-17(2)18(3)16-25(36)40-30-26(19-4-10-22(33)11-5-19)29(38)31(41-32(39)21-8-14-24(35)15-9-21)27(28(30)37)20-6-12-23(34)13-7-20/h4-15,17-18,33-35,37-38H,16H2,1-3H3 Key: IXNCXNGAGCSAMG-UHFFFAOYSA-N; D: InChI=1S/C30H26O8/c1-2-6-23(33)37-29-25(19-9-13-21(31)14-10-19)28(36)30(38-24(34)17-18-7-4-3-5-8-18)26(27(29)35)20-11-15-22(32)16-12-20/h3-5,7-16,31-32,35-36H,2,6,17H2,1H3 Key: WQRIEKDUHJQWLC-UHFFFAOYSA-N
- SMILES: A: CCCC(=O)OC1=C(C(=C(C(=C1O)C2=CC=C(C=C2)O)OC(=O)C3=CC=C(C=C3)O)O)C4=CC=C(C=C4)O; B: CCCCCC(=O)OC1=C(C(=C(C(=C1C2=CC=C(C=C2)O)O)OC(=O)C3=CC=C(C=C3)O)C4=CC=C(C=C4)O)O; C: CC(C)C(C)CC(=O)OC1=C(C(=C(C(=C1C2=CC=C(C=C2)O)O)OC(=O)C3=CC=C(C=C3)O)C4=CC=C(C=C4)O)O; D: CCCC(=O)OC1=C(C(=C(C(=C1C2=CC=C(C=C2)O)O)OC(=O)CC3=CC=CC=C3)C4=CC=C(C=C4)O)O

Properties
| Chemical formula | A: C_{29}H_{24}O_{9} B: C_{31}H_{28}O_{9} C: C_{32}H_{30}O_{9} D: C_{30}H_{26}O_{8} |
- Except where otherwise noted, data are given for materials in their standard state (at 25 °C [77 °F], 100 kPa). Infobox references

Thelephantins are a group of pigments found in the inedible mushroom Thelephora aurantiotincta. Chemically, they are classified as polyphenols and terphenyl derivatives.

Three variants (thelephantin A, B, C) have been elucidated by high-resolution 2D nuclear magnetic resonance, mass spectroscopy, infrared and ultraviolet spectra as well as an acetylated congener of thelephantin A. The structure of telephantin G was revised and confirmed by total synthesis.
