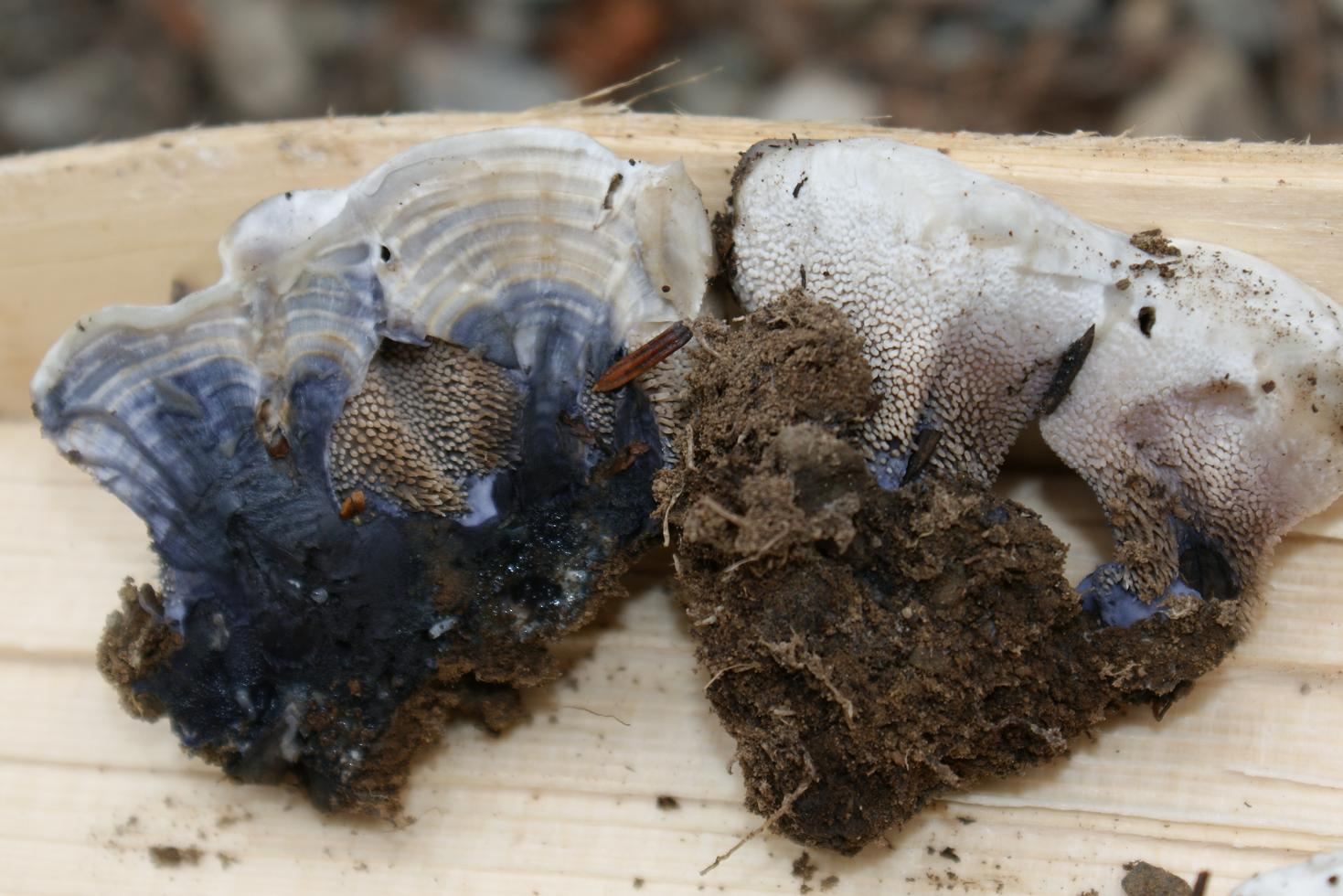

Scientific classification
- Kingdom: Fungi
- Division: Basidiomycota
- Class: Agaricomycetes
- Order: Thelephorales
- Family: Bankeraceae
- Genus: Hydnellum
- Species: H. suaveolens

Binomial name
- Hydnellum suaveolens (Scop.) P.Karst. (1879)

Synonyms
- Hydnum suaveolens Scop. (1772)

= Hydnellum suaveolens =

Species of fungus

Hydnellum suaveolens
- Mycological characteristics
- Teeth on hymenium
- Cap is flat
- Hymenium is decurrent
- Stipe is bare
- Spore print is brown
- Ecology is mycorrhizal
- Edibility is inedible

Hydnellum suaveolens, commonly known as the fragrant hydnellum mushroom, is a species of fungus. It has a funnel-shaped cap that is typically between 5–15 cm (2–6 in) in diameter. As its name suggests, it has a strong odor of anise or peppermint.

The species is often found beneath conifers and is inedible. Gas chromatographic-mass spectral analysis of diethyl ether extracts from fresh specimens of this fungi showed p-anisaldehyde and coumarin to comprise 30% and 62% respectively of the volatile odor compounds present.
