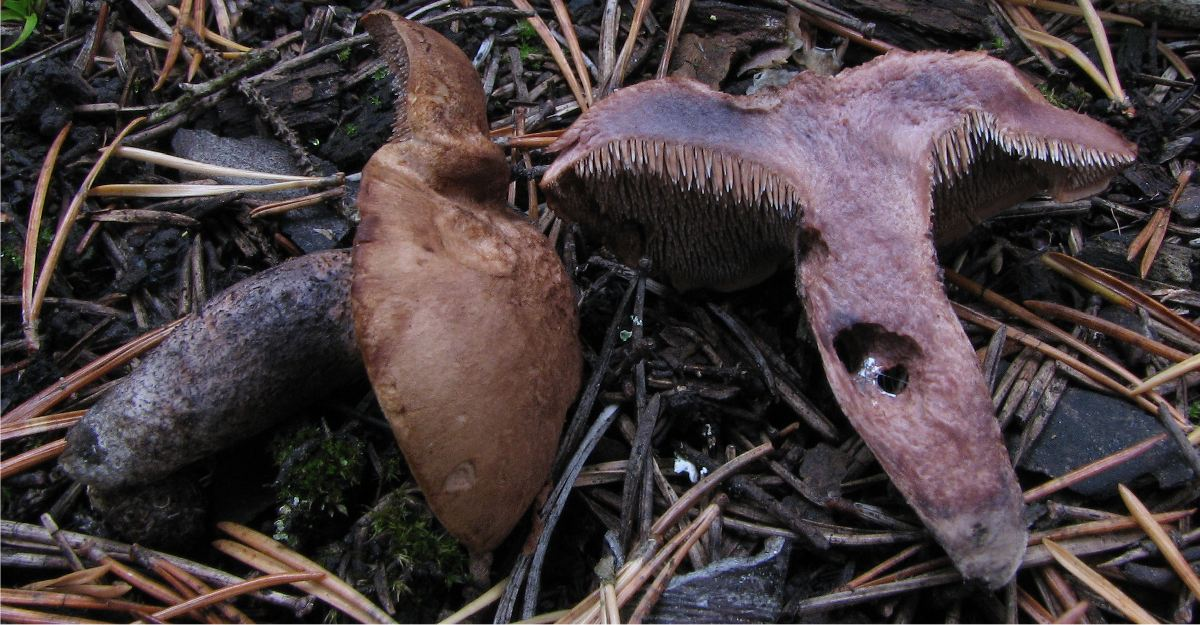

Scientific classification
- Kingdom: Fungi
- Division: Basidiomycota
- Class: Agaricomycetes
- Order: Thelephorales
- Family: Bankeraceae
- Genus: Hydnellum
- Species: H. fuligineoviolaceum

Binomial name
- Hydnellum fuligineoviolaceum (Kalchbr.) E.Larss., K.H.Larss. & Kõljalg (2019)

Synonyms
- Hydnum fuligineoviolaceum Kalchbr. (1874); Sarcodon talpa Maas Geest. (1967); Sarcodon fuligineoviolaceus (Kalchbr.) Pat.

= Hydnellum fuligineoviolaceum =

Species of fungus

Hydnellum fuligineoviolaceum is a species of tooth fungus in the family Bankeraceae. Found in northern Europe, it grows in association with coniferous trees, particularly Scots pine, and forms fruiting bodies that emerge from dry, chalky soils in mature forests. The species is classified by the IUCN as vulnerable due to habitat loss.

== Taxonomy ==
Hydnellum fuligineoviolaceum was first described in 1874 by the Hungarian mycologist Károly Kalchbrenner as Hydnum fuligineoviolaceum in Elias Fries's Hymenomycetes europaei. In 1900, Narcisse Théophile Patouillard transferred the species to the genus Sarcodon. Later, in 1967, Rudolph Arnold Maas Geesteranus published Sarcodon talpa, now recognised as a synonym of this taxon. Molecular studies have reinstated the species in the genus Hydnellum, reflecting a narrower generic concept supported by DNA analyses; as of 2024, no genetic sequences of this species are known from outside northern Europe, and specimens assigned to H. fuligineoviolaceum elsewhere almost certainly represent distinct taxa rather than true conspecifics.

== Habitat and distribution ==
Hydnellum fuligineoviolaceum forms ectomycorrhizal associations primarily with members of the Pinaceae, most frequently with Scots pine (Pinus sylvestris), but also occasionally with firs such as silver fir (Abies alba) and Greek fir (A. cephalonica), and possibly Norway spruce (Picea abies). It specialises on nutrient‑poor, dry calcareous soils, typically those with an acidic litter layer and minimal humus. In Mediterranean and temperate regions, it inhabits mature pine forests, whereas in alpine zones it can occur under fir, and in northern Europe it favours older, open pine stands. Its largest subpopulations occur in Norway, Spain, and Sweden.

== Conservation status ==
In 2004, H. fuligineoviolaceum was among 33 fungal species proposed for legal protection under the Bern Convention by the European Council for Conservation of Fungi, signalling early concern for its preservation across Europe. Subsequently, the species was assessed by the IUCN's Global Fungal Red List Initiative and officially listed as Vulnerable, reflecting an estimated decline in habitat quality and area exceeding 30 % percent over the past 50 years and continuing losses of old‑growth calcareous coniferous woodland. Although the total number of mature individuals probably exceeds 5000, populations are small, fragmented and confined to scattered localities—with especially significant subpopulations in Sweden, Norway and Spain—and the rate of ongoing decline justifies its threatened status.

Ongoing threats stem largely from forest management practices, notably clearcutting of ancient calcareous pine stands, which destroys both fruiting bodies and the mycelial networks on which the fungus depends. Conservation measures recommended include formal protection of known localities, incorporation of its ecological requirements into sustainable harvesting guidelines, and wider dissemination of information on its biology and conservation importance. Priority research needs focus on detailed population biology and long‑term monitoring to better understand trends and inform management.
