= Glenmont, Nova Scotia =

Community in Nova Scotia, Canada

Coordinates: 45°11′11.45″N 64°30′6.96″W

Glenmont in Nova Scotia

Glenmont is a community in the Canadian province of Nova Scotia, located in Kings County.
