= Howard James Banker =

American mycologist (1866–1940)

Howard James Banker (April 19, 1866 in Schaghticoke, New York – November 13, 1940) was an American mycologist. He received his PhD from Columbia University in 1908. Banker was an associate editor of the journal Mycologia starting from its establishment in 1909, until it became the official publication of the Mycological Society of America in 1933. He published several papers in the journal, including a revision of the North American Hydnaceae, which discussed 62 species in 10 genera. Banker died at his home in Huntington, New York, in 1940. The genus Bankera is named after him.

== Selected publications ==
- Banker JH. 1902. A Historical Review of the Proposed Genera of the Hydnaceae. Bulletin of the Torrey Botanical Club, Vol. 29, No. 7, pp. 436–448
- _________. 1909. A New Fungus of the Swamp Cedar. Bulletin of the Torrey Botanical Club, Vol. 36, No. 6, pp. 341–343
- _________. 1912. Type Studies in the Hydnaceae II. The Genus Steccherinum. Mycologia, Vol. 4, No. 6, pp. 309–318
- _________. 1912. Type Studies in the Hydnaceae: I. The Genus Manina. Mycologia, Vol. 4, No. 5, pp. 271–278
- _________. 1913. Type Studies in the Hydnaceae: V. The Genus Hydnellum. Mycologia, Vol. 5, No. 4, pp. 194–205
- _________. 1913. Type Studies in the Hydnaceae III. The Genus Sarcodon. Mycologia, Vol. 5, No. 1, pp. 12–17
- _________. 1913. Type Studies in the Hydnaceae: VI. The Genera Creolophus, Echinodontium, Gloiodon, and Hydnodon. Mycologia, Vol. 5, No. 6, pp. 293–298
- _________. 1913. Type Studies in the Hydnaceae: IV. The Genus Phellodon. Mycologia, Vol. 5, No. 2, pp. 62–66
- _________. 1914. Type Studies in the Hydnaceae: VII. The Genera Asterodon and Hydnochaete. Mycologia, Vol. 6, No. 5, pp. 231–234
- _________. 1929. Notes on the Hydnaceae. Mycologia, Vol. 21, No. 3, pp. 145–150

== See also ==
- List of mycologists
