= Kenneth A. Harrison =

Canadian mycologist (1901-1991)

Kenneth A. Harrison (1901 – November 5, 1991) was a Canadian mycologist. He was for many years a plant pathologist at what is now the Atlantic Food and Horticulture Research Centre in Nova Scotia. After retirement, he contributed to the taxonomy of the Agaricomycotina, particularly the tooth fungi of the families Hydnaceae and Bankeraceae, in which he described several new species.

== Early life and career ==
Originally from New Brunswick, Harrison graduated from Nova Scotia Agricultural College in 1922, and, in 1924, from the Ontario Agricultural College with a B.Sc. in agriculture. He earned an MSc in plant pathology from Macdonald Campus of McGill University a year later. A doctoral degree he started at the University of Toronto in 1929 was abandoned due to the Great Depression. He established a herbarium of mycological specimens where he was employed for many years at the Kentville Research Station (now the Atlantic Food and Horticulture Research Centre); most of his collections are now housed at the Canadian National Mycological Herbarium. His early research concerned the fungal infestation of plants, such as that of Colletotrichum lindemuthianum on beans (Phaseolus). Working with John Frederick DeWitt Hockey, they made many contributions to the control and prevention of diseases of horticultural crops. They were among the first to use the sticky slide spore trap to estimate the densities of fungal spores.

== Post-retirement activities ==
After his retirement in 1966, Harrison began studying the mushroom-producing species of the Agaricomycotina more avidly. Collections forays throughout Nova Scotia, in the Great Smoky Mountains, New Mexico, the Upper Peninsula of Michigan, and the Pacific Northwest led to him describing several new species in the genera Steccherinum, and tooth fungi in Hydnellum, Sarcodon, Phellodon. Harrison died in Kentville, Nova Scotia, in 1991. The Department of Biology at Acadia University has a mycology laboratory named in his honour.

== Eponymous species ==
The tooth fungus Sarcodon harrisonii was named in his honor by Richard Baird, who noted "Dr. Kenneth Harrison the North American expert on the stipitate hydnums. From his publications, professional and amateur mycologists can more easily identify the taxa of the group". Other fungi named after Harrison include:

- Boletus harrisonii A.H. Sm. & Thiers
- Ramaria harrisonii R.H. Petersen 1986
- Psathyrella harrisonii A.H. Sm. 1972
- Cortinarius harrisonii Ammirati, Niskanen & Liimat. 2013

== See also ==
- List of mycologists
