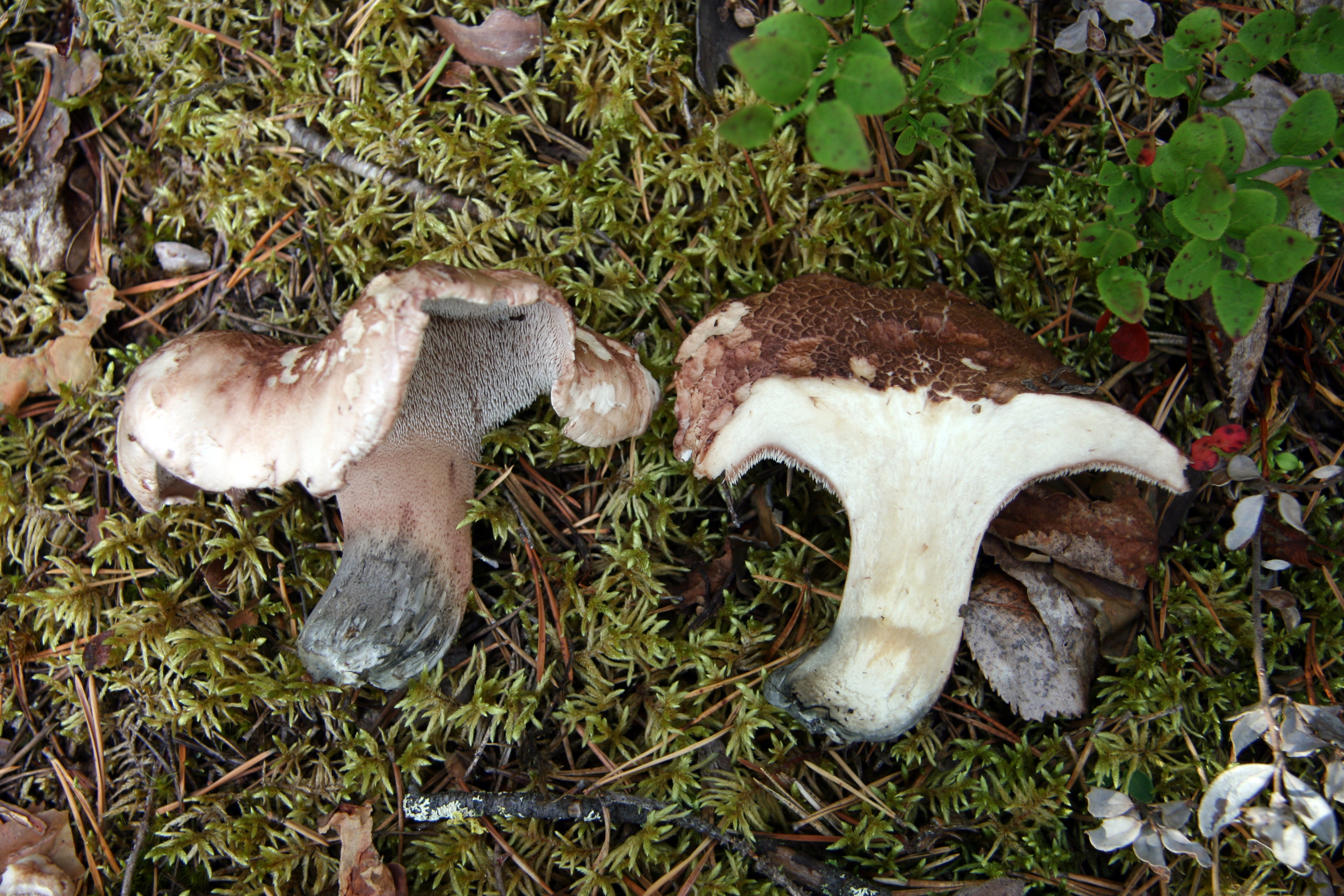

Scientific classification
- Domain: Eukaryota
- Kingdom: Fungi
- Division: Basidiomycota
- Class: Agaricomycetes
- Order: Thelephorales
- Family: Bankeraceae
- Genus: Hydnellum
- Species: H. scabrosum

Binomial name
- Hydnellum scabrosum (Fr.) E.Larss., K.H.Larss. & Kõljalg

Synonyms
- Sarcodon scabrosus (Fr.) P. Karst.

= Hydnellum scabrosum =

Species of fungus

Hydnellum scabrosum Mycological characteristics
- Teeth on hymenium
- Cap is convex or flat
- Hymenium is subdecurrent or adnate
- Stipe is bare
- Spore print is brown
- Ecology is mycorrhizal
- Edibility is inedible

Hydnellum scabrosum, also called bitter tooth or bitter hedgehog, is a species of tooth fungus in the family Bankeraceae.

== Taxonomy ==
It was originally described by Swedish botanist Elias Fries as Hydnum scabrosum in 1836. Finnish mycologist Petter Karsten moved it to the genus Sarcodon in 1881. This species remained as Sarcodon scabrosus until 2019, when a molecular analysis using nuclear DNA showed that this and 11 other species lay genetically within the genus Hydnellum, a genus of which harder woody flesh had previously been considered a distinguishing feature from soft-fleshed Sarcodon.

== Description ==
The fruit body (mushroom) has a convex to flattened brownish cap up to 12 cm (4 3/4 in) across that is covered with brown scales. It can be tinged with pink at the margins and darken with age. The mushroom has yellow-brown spines under the cap that are 5 mm (1/4 in) long and 0.3 mm (1/64 in) in diameter. They are decurrent to the stem. The pinkish brown stem is 2–12 cm (3/4–4 3/4 in) high and 1–6 cm (3/8–2 3/8 in) wide, and has a narrower base that is a characteristic greyish green colour. The flesh is whitish and has a bitter taste, rendering the mushroom inedible. The flesh smells farinaceous or like watermelon when cut.

=== Similar species ===
Within the genus it is most closely related to H. fennicum.

Sarcodon imbricatus is similar, but the scales do not become as prominent in age. Other similar species include S. fennicus, S. rimosus, S. subincarnatus, and S. underwoodii.

== Distribution and habitat ==
It is found in association with hardwood forests across Eurasia to Japan, as well as North America.

== Biochemistry ==
The species has been investigated for bioactive agents. In 2004, Tsunashi Kamo and colleagues isolated diterpenoids with experimental anti-inflammatory activity. Other diterpenoids were shown to stimulate nerve growth factor (NGF). Yet another agent, an alpha-pyrone, was shown to inhibit lettuce seedling growth.
