= Sarcodon quercinofibulatus =

Scientific classification
- Kingdom: Fungi
- Division: Basidiomycota
- Class: Agaricomycetes
- Order: Thelephorales
- Family: Bankeraceae
- Genus: Sarcodon
- Species: S. quercinofibulatus

Binomial name
- Sarcodon quercinofibulatus Pérez-De-Greg., Macau & J.Carbó (2011)

Species of fungus

Sarcodon quercinofibulatus is a species of tooth fungus in the family Bankeraceae. Its specific name reflects both its ecological association with oak trees (Quercus) and the distinctive presence of clamp connections on its hyphae, which distinguishes it from related European species. The fungus produces brownish-grey scaled caps 6–14 cm broad with short cream to grey-brown spines underneath and is strictly ectomycorrhizal with sessile oak, downy oak, and European beech. Known only from northeastern Catalonia in Spain, it fruits on the forest floor of deciduous woodlands during summer and early autumn at elevations between 400–1000 metres.

== Taxonomy ==
Sarcodon quercinofibulatum was recognised as new to science in 2011 by Pérez‑De‑Gregorio, Macau, and Carbó. The specific epithet derives from Quercus ("oak") and the Latin fibulatum ("with clamps"), reflecting its ecology and the pervasive presence of clamp connections on its hyphae. The holotype specimen was collected under sessile oak (Quercus petraea) at Puig Rodon, La Vall de Bianya (Province of Girona), at 400 m elevation, on 18 July 2009.

In taxonomic comparisons, it differs from the two common European "scaled‐cap" species — S. imbricatus (associated with Picea) and S. squamosus (with Pinus) — both of which lack clamps on their hyphae and grow under conifers. In their original circumscription of Sarcodon quercinofibulatus, Pérez‑De‑Gregorio and colleagues recognised it as a distinct taxon in the S. imbricatus complex on the basis of its strict association with oaks and its conspicuously scaly, light‑brown pileus. Subsequent molecular phylogenetic work by Vizziniand colleages (2013) validated this placement: ITS sequences from five Italian collections under Castanea sativa and eighteen Mexican collections under Quercus clustered with the Spanish isotype of S. quercinofibulatus, forming a fully supported monophyletic clade that is sister to a clade containing S. squamosus, S. imbricatus and S. aspratus.

Four morphological sections of Sarcodon—Sarcodon, Violacei, Squamiceps and Scabrosi—originally proposed by Rudolf Arnold Maas Geesteranus on purely anatomical grounds, each correspond to well‑supported clades in the molecular tree, thereby corroborating the infrageneric framework of the genus. This phylogenetic confirmation reinforces the recognition of S. quercinofibulatus as a bona fide species, ecologically and genetically distinct from its conifer‑associated relatives in the imbricatus complex.

== Description ==
The cap is 6–14 cm broad, initially convex then flattening with a low, sometimes indistinct central bump (umbo. Its surface slips free from the flesh and breaks into coarse, concentric scales that are brown to grey‑brown, darker or almost black towards the centre. The margin is smooth, incurved and finely striate.

Beneath the cap, the hymenophore (the fertile, spore-bering surface) bears short, decurrent spines ("teeth") 5–8 mm long, pale cream when young, becoming grey‑brown in maturity. The stipe is 5–8 cm tall by 1–1.5 cm thick, club‑shaped, initially cream‑coloured but ageing to grey‑brown, and carries a few scattered spines near the apex. The flesh is firm, cream‑white, slowly greying on exposure, with a faintly bitter taste and a mild fungoid odour. In contact with 10 % KOH it turns greyish‑green. Microscopically, the spores are broadly egg‑shaped to roughly spherical (globose), finely tuberculate, measuring 6.5–7.4 by 5.4–6.4 micrometres (μm) (average 7.0 by 5.9 μm). The basidia are 30–40 by 8–10 μm and mostly bear four spores. Clamp connections — small hook‑like hyphal structures involved in cell division — are abundant on all tissues, including the cap cuticle, spines and stipe trama. The hyphal system is monomitic, meaning it contains only generative hyphae.

== Habitat and distribution ==
This species is strictly ectomycorrhizal with sessile oak, downy oak and European beech, fruiting on the forest floor of pure deciduous stands of sessile oak and Italian maple. The soil at the type locality is slightly acidic (pH ≈ 6.7) at 400 m elevation. Fruiting occurs in summer and early autumn (July–September).

All known collections come from north‑eastern Catalonia: five gatherings under sessile oak at La Vall de Bianya (400 m) between 2007 and 2010, and a single autumn 2010 record from mixed beech–oak woodland near Rupit (1000 m) in the El Vilar de Pruit area (Osona).
