= Hydnellum illudens =

Conservation status
- Vulnerable (IUCN 3.1)

Scientific classification
- Kingdom: Fungi
- Division: Basidiomycota
- Class: Agaricomycetes
- Order: Thelephorales
- Family: Bankeraceae
- Genus: Hydnellum
- Species: H. illudens

Binomial name
- Hydnellum illudens (Maas Geest.) Nitare (2021)

Species of fungus

Hydnellum illudens is a species of tooth fungus in the family Bankeraceae, found in central and northern Europe. It produces pinkish-violet fruiting bodies that darken with age, featuring scaly caps up to 7 cm across and white spines underneath that turn purplish-brown. The fungus grows in association with hardwood trees.

== Taxonomy ==
The fungus was described in 1976 by Dutch mycologist Rudolph Arnold Maas Geesteranus, from collections made in France. It was initially classified in the genus Sarcodon. The taxon was reclassified into the genus Hydnellum following a molecular phylogenetics-led reevaluation of its status.

== Description ==
Hydnellum illudens produces stalked fruit bodies (basidiocarps) with caps (pilei) up to 7 cm across. Young caps are evenly velutinate—that is, covered in a fine, velvet‑like down—but as they mature the surface breaks into flat‑lying scales whose tips stand proud. Initial cap colour is pinkish‑violet, darkening through blackish tones to deep brown with age.

Beneath the cap, the hymenophore (the fertile, spore-bearing surface) consists of slender, downward‑pointing spines (or "teeth") up to 5 mm long. These begin white and soon darken to purplish‑brown. The flesh (context) is uniformly white.

The stipe measures up to 5 cm in height and 1.5 cm in thickness. It is initially minutely tomentose—clothed in fine hairs—but becomes smooth (glabrous) over time, retaining occasional fibre‑like threads (fibrils). Its colour mirrors the cap, starting brownish‑white and turning deep brown at maturity.

Under the microscope, the vegetative hyphae are simple‑septate (divided by single cross‑walls), typically 2–6 micrometre (μm) wide but reaching up to 22 μm in the cap tissue. The basidiospores are elliptic, coarsely tuberculate (bearing wart‑like projections), and measure 6.3–7 by 3.6–4.5 μm when mature.

== Habitat and distribution ==
Hydnellum illudens occurs throughout central Europe, with its northern range extending to central Norway. It forms ectomycorrhizal associations with hardwood trees.
