= Hydnellum lepidum =

Scientific classification
- Kingdom: Fungi
- Division: Basidiomycota
- Class: Agaricomycetes
- Order: Thelephorales
- Family: Bankeraceae
- Genus: Hydnellum
- Species: H. lepidum

Binomial name
- Hydnellum lepidum (Maas Geest.) E.Larss., K.H.Larss. & Kõljalg

Synonyms
- Sarcodon lepidus Maas Geest. (1975); Sarcodon regalis Maas Geest. (1976)

Species of mushroom-forming fungus

Hydnellum lepidum is a species of tooth fungus in the family Bankeraceae. Found in Europe, it produces pinkish‑brown to purplish‑brown fruiting bodies with scaly caps up to 10 cm across and downward‑pointing spines underneath. The fungus forms mycorrhizal associations with deciduous trees, particularly oak.

== Taxonomy ==
The fungs was described as new to science in 1975 by the Dutch mycologist Rudolph Arnold Maas Geesteranus.

Molecular studies have confirmed that Hydnellum lepidum belongs in Maas Geesteranus's sect. Scabrosi and that Sarcodon regalis—originally described alongside S. lepidus—is in fact conspecific with H. lepidum, making S. regalis a later synonym. Moreover, DNA sequences from collections formerly assigned to S. cyrneus and H. underwoodii fall within the H. lepidum clade, showing how basidiome morphology and pigmentation alone can mislead and highlighting the importance of combining careful macroscopic observation with molecular data for reliable species delimitation.

== Description ==
Hydnellum lepidum produces stalked fruit bodies (basidiocarps) that may occur singly or in small groups, sometimes with adjacent caps fusing together (concrescent). The cap (pileus) spans 5–10 cm in diameter and is initially flat to slightly convex, becoming gently depressed at the centre in age. Young caps are clothed in a fine, woolly down (tomentose), which soon wears away to leave a surface that is fibrous (fibrillose) and scaly—especially towards the centre. Colouration begins as pinkish‑brown and deepens to purplish‑brown with maturity.

Beneath the cap, the hymenophore (fertile spore-bearing surface) bears downward‑pointing spines (teeth) up to 3 mm long that run down the stipe (decurrent). These spines start off pale and soon take on a purplish‑brown hue. The flesh (context) of the cap is white and up to 6 mm thick at its centre, remaining firm yet slightly fibrous.

The stipe reaches 3–4 cm in height and 0.5–1.2 cm in width, tapering towards the base. It is initially covered in the same fine tomentum as the cap before becoming smooth (glabrous) with age. The stipe matches the cap's pinkish‑brown tones but often shows a greyish‑green tinge at its base.

Under the microscope, the cap tissue comprises simply septate hyphae—thread‑like cells divided by single cross‑walls—up to 24 micrometre (μm) wide. The basidiospores are elliptic to irregularly angular or bearing small wart‑like projections (tuberculate), measuring 5.8–6.3 by 3.5–4.3 μm, and are pale brown when mature.

== Habitat and distribution ==
Hydnellum lepidum is widely distributed in Europe, where it forms mycorrhizal associations with deciduous trees, particularly oak (Quercus). In Norway, its northern range extends to the southern tip of the country.
