= Sarcodon pakaraimensis =

Scientific classification
- Domain: Eukaryota
- Kingdom: Fungi
- Division: Basidiomycota
- Class: Agaricomycetes
- Order: Thelephorales
- Family: Bankeraceae
- Genus: Sarcodon
- Species: S. pakaraimensis

Binomial name
- Sarcodon pakaraimensis A.Grupe & T.W.Henkel (2015)

Species of fungus

Sarcodon pakaraimensis is a species of tooth fungus in the family Bankeraceae. Found in Guyana, where it grows in mixed Pakaraimaea–Dicymbe forest, it was described as new to science in 2015. It is differentiated from other Sarcodon species by its smooth to pitted, pinkish-gray cap that stains black, its hollow stipe, and the pink staining reaction of injured flesh. Its spores measure 5–7 μm long by 5–9 μm wide. They make a fresh dark reddish-brown spore print, which tends to lighten to yellowish brown when it is dry. Molecular analysis of DNA sequences shows the fungus to be closely related to S. umbilicatus. The specific epithet pakaraimensis refers to the Pakaraima Mountains—the type locality.
