= Sarcodon aglaosoma =

Scientific classification
- Kingdom: Fungi
- Division: Basidiomycota
- Class: Agaricomycetes
- Order: Thelephorales
- Family: Bankeraceae
- Genus: Sarcodon
- Species: S. aglaosoma

Binomial name
- Sarcodon aglaosoma Maas Geest. (1976)

Species of fungus

Sarcodon aglaosoma is a species of tooth fungus in the family Bankeraceae. Found in Papua New Guinea, it was described as new to science in 1976 by Dutch mycologist Rudolph Arnold Maas Geesteranus. It is quite similar to H. joeides and S. ianthinus, both also from New Guinea.
