= Sarcodon wrightii =

Scientific classification
- Kingdom: Fungi
- Division: Basidiomycota
- Class: Agaricomycetes
- Order: Thelephorales
- Family: Bankeraceae
- Genus: Sarcodon
- Species: S. wrightii

Binomial name
- Sarcodon wrightii (Berk. & M.A.Curtis) Maas Geest. (1967)

Synonyms
- Hydnum wrightii Berk. & M.A.Curtis (1860)

Species of fungus

Sarcodon wrightii is a species of tooth fungus in the family Bankeraceae. It was first described in 1860 by Miles Berkeley and Moses Ashley Curtis as Hydnum wrightii. They were sent a specimen collected from Japan as part of the North Pacific Exploring and Surveying Expedition (1853–56). Rudolph Arnold Maas Geesteranus transferred it to the genus Sarcodon in 1967. The fungus produces roughly spherical spores that are tuberculate (covered in warts) and measure 5.5–6.5 by 4.5–5.5 μm.
