= Sarcodon quercophilus =

Scientific classification
- Domain: Eukaryota
- Kingdom: Fungi
- Division: Basidiomycota
- Class: Agaricomycetes
- Order: Thelephorales
- Family: Bankeraceae
- Genus: Sarcodon
- Species: S. quercophilus

Binomial name
- Sarcodon quercophilus A.Grupe & D.J.Lodge (2015)

Species of fungus

Sarcodon quercophilus is a species of tooth fungus in the family Bankeraceae. Found in Belize, where it grows on the ground in mountainous cloud forest under oak, it was described as new to science in 2015.
