= Sarcodon procerus =

Scientific classification
- Domain: Eukaryota
- Kingdom: Fungi
- Division: Basidiomycota
- Class: Agaricomycetes
- Order: Thelephorales
- Family: Bankeraceae
- Genus: Sarcodon
- Species: S. procerus

Binomial name
- Sarcodon procerus Maas Geest. (1967)

Species of fungus

Sarcodon procerus is a species of tooth fungus in the family Bankeraceae. Found in the Democratic Republic of the Congo, it was described as new to science in 1967 by Dutch mycologist Rudolph Arnold Maas Geesteranus. Its spores measure 6.7–8 by 4.5–5.4 μm.
