= Sarcodon harrisonii =

Scientific classification
- Domain: Eukaryota
- Kingdom: Fungi
- Division: Basidiomycota
- Class: Agaricomycetes
- Order: Thelephorales
- Family: Bankeraceae
- Genus: Sarcodon
- Species: S. harrisonii

Binomial name
- Sarcodon harrisonii R.E.Baird (1985)

Species of fungus

Sarcodon harrisonii is a species of tooth fungus in the family Bankeraceae. Found in the southeastern United States, it was described as new to science in 1985 by Richard Baird. The type collection was made near Asheville, North Carolina. The fruit body has a flattened cap up to 17 cm (6.7 in) wide with a leathery surface texture that is reddish brown to dark brown. Spores are more or less spherical, measuring 7–8 by 6–7.5 μm. S. harrisonii is similar in appearance to the Michigan species S. ustalis. The specific epithet honors Canadian mycologist Kenneth A. Harrison for his work on stipitate hydnums.
