= Sarcodon portoricensis =

Scientific classification
- Domain: Eukaryota
- Kingdom: Fungi
- Division: Basidiomycota
- Class: Agaricomycetes
- Order: Thelephorales
- Family: Bankeraceae
- Genus: Sarcodon
- Species: S. portoricensis

Binomial name
- Sarcodon portoricensis A.Grupe & T.J.Baroni (2015)

Species of fungus

Sarcodon portoricensis is a species of tooth fungus in the family Bankeraceae. Found in Puerto Rico, where it grows on clay soils of low-elevation wet forests, it was described as new to science in 2015.
