= Sarcodon caliginosus =

Scientific classification
- Kingdom: Fungi
- Division: Basidiomycota
- Class: Agaricomycetes
- Order: Thelephorales
- Family: Bankeraceae
- Genus: Sarcodon
- Species: S. caliginosus

Binomial name
- Sarcodon caliginosus Maas Geest. (1974)

Species of fungus

Sarcodon caliginosus is a species of tooth fungus in the family Bankeraceae. Found in Papua New Guinea, it was described as new to science in 1974 by Dutch mycologist Rudolph Arnold Maas Geesteranus. Its fruit bodies have dark grey-brown caps with reddish tinges and brownish-pink coloration at the margins.
