= Sarcodon excentricus =

Scientific classification
- Domain: Eukaryota
- Kingdom: Fungi
- Division: Basidiomycota
- Class: Agaricomycetes
- Order: Thelephorales
- Family: Bankeraceae
- Genus: Sarcodon
- Species: S. excentricus

Binomial name
- Sarcodon excentricus Coker & Beers ex R.E.Baird (1985)

Synonyms
- Sarcodon excentricus Coker & Beers (1951)

Species of fungus

Sarcodon excentricus is a species of tooth fungus in the family Bankeraceae. The fungus was originally described in 1951 by William Chambers Coker and Alma Holland Beers. The type collection was made by Lexemuel Ray Hesler in Cades Cove, Tennessee in 1937. Coker and Beers did not include a description of the fungus written in Latin—a requirement of the nomenclatural code at the time—and so their new species was not validly published. Richard Baird published S. excentricus validly in 1985.
