= Sarcodon humilis =

Scientific classification
- Domain: Eukaryota
- Kingdom: Fungi
- Division: Basidiomycota
- Class: Agaricomycetes
- Order: Thelephorales
- Family: Bankeraceae
- Genus: Sarcodon
- Species: S. humilis

Binomial name
- Sarcodon humilis Maas Geest. (1971)

Species of fungus

Sarcodon humilis is a species of tooth fungus in the family Bankeraceae. Found in Malaysia, it was described as new to science in 1971 by Dutch mycologist Rudolph Arnold Maas Geesteranus.
