= Sarcodon bubalinus =

Scientific classification
- Domain: Eukaryota
- Kingdom: Fungi
- Division: Basidiomycota
- Class: Agaricomycetes
- Order: Thelephorales
- Family: Bankeraceae
- Genus: Sarcodon
- Species: S. bubalinus

Binomial name
- Sarcodon bubalinus (Pers.) Maas Geest. (1956)

Synonyms
- Hydnum bubalinum Pers. (1825)

Species of fungus

Sarcodon bubalinus is a European species of tooth fungus in the family Bankeraceae. First described by Christian Hendrik Persoon in 1825 as Hydnum bubalinum, it was transferred to the genus Sarcodon by Rudolph Arnold Maas Geesteranus in 1956.
