= Sarcodon praestans =

Scientific classification
- Kingdom: Fungi
- Division: Basidiomycota
- Class: Agaricomycetes
- Order: Thelephorales
- Family: Bankeraceae
- Genus: Sarcodon
- Species: S. praestans

Binomial name
- Sarcodon praestans Maas Geest. (1974)

Species of fungus

Sarcodon praestans is a species of tooth fungus in the family Bankeraceae. Found in Papua New Guinea, it was described as new to science in 1974 by Dutch mycologist Rudolph Arnold Maas Geesteranus.
