= Sarcodon rutilus =

Scientific classification
- Kingdom: Fungi
- Division: Basidiomycota
- Class: Agaricomycetes
- Order: Thelephorales
- Family: Bankeraceae
- Genus: Sarcodon
- Species: S. rutilus

Binomial name
- Sarcodon rutilus Maas Geest. (1974)

Species of fungus

Sarcodon rutilus is a species of tooth fungus in the family Bankeraceae. Found in Papua New Guinea, it was described as new to science in 1974 by Dutch mycologist Rudolph Arnold Maas Geesteranus. The specific epithet rutilus refers to the red cap.
