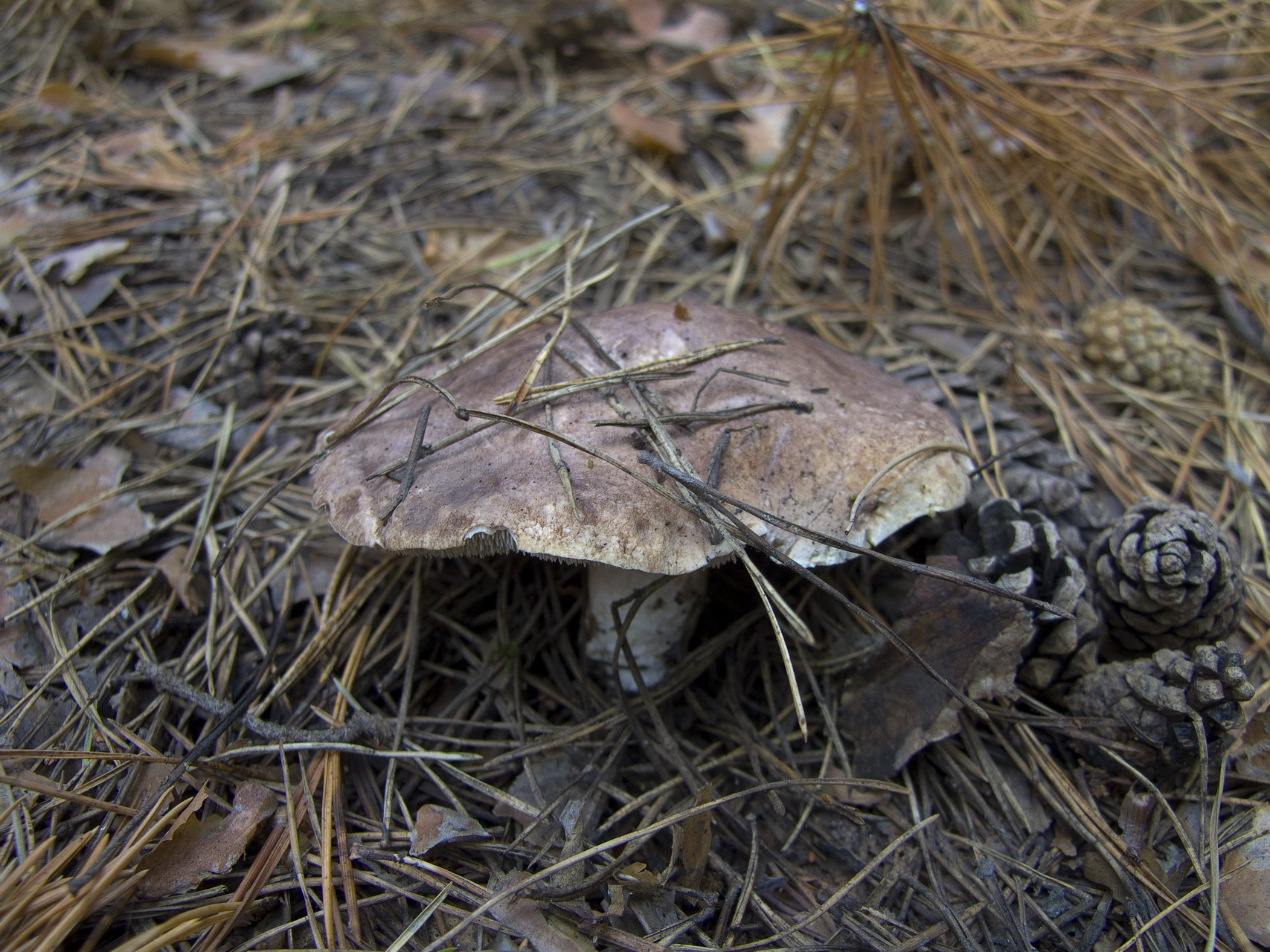
- In Akademgorodok, Novosibirsk, Russia

Conservation status
- Near Threatened (IUCN 3.1)

Scientific classification
- Kingdom: Fungi
- Division: Basidiomycota
- Class: Agaricomycetes
- Order: Thelephorales
- Family: Bankeraceae
- Genus: Sarcodon
- Species: S. leucopus

Binomial name
- Sarcodon leucopus (Pers.) Maas Geest. & Nannf. (1969)

Synonyms
- Hydnum leucopus Pers. (1825)

= Sarcodon leucopus =

Species of fungus

Sarcodon leucopus is a species of tooth fungus in the family Bankeraceae. It is found in Asia and Europe, where it grows in association with pine trees. The fungus produces a pale brown fruiting body up to 20 cm across, with thin downward-pointing spines on its underside that start whitish and age to purplish-brown. It is considered near-threatened by the IUCN and endangered in Switzerland.

== Taxonomy ==
The fungus was described as new to science in 1825 by Christian Hendrik Persoon. The mycologists Rudolph Arnold Maas Geesteranus and John Axel Nannfeldt transferred it to the genus Sarcodon in 1969.

== Description ==
Sarcodon leucopus produces a fleshy, pale brown fruit body (basidiocarp) up to 20 cm in diameter, borne on a central or slightly off‑centre stipe. When young, the cap (pileus) is cushion‑shaped (pulvinate) before flattening out or developing a shallow central depression. Its surface is initially covered in a fine, velvety down (velutinate), soon becoming smooth (glabrous) yet remaining soft in fresh specimens. The surface of older caps later cracks to form shiny scales. Colouration ranges from medium brown to a pale purplish‑brown. On the underside, the hymenophore (spore-producing region) consists of slender spines up to 5 mm long that run down the stipe (decurrent); these begin whitish, then age through grey and brown to purplish‑brown. The stipe measures 4–8 cm (1.6–3.1 in) long by 2–6 cm (0.8–2.4 in) thick.

The flesh (context) is white, soft and fibrous, up to 1 cm thick, and often emits a spicy odour; the taste is distinctly bitter. When cut, the context may stain greenish to pink. The stipe measures up to 7 cm tall by 2–3 cm wide, is cylindrical (sometimes slightly flattened or eccentric), and is finely felted at first before becoming fibrillose (with fibre‑like threads) or entirely smooth; it is whitish when young, often turning grey or greenish towards the base with age.

Microscopically, the hyphae bear clamp connections and can reach 20 μm in width. The basidiospores are brown, coarsely angular and irregularly outlined, measuring 7–9 by 5–7 μm.

=== Chemistry ===
The fruit bodies of Sarcodon leucopus contain novel compounds called sarcoviolins that have been shown to have antioxidative and α-glucosidase inhibitory activity in laboratory experiments.

== Habitat and distribution ==
Sarcodon leucopus forms ectomycorrhizal partnerships with pine trees (Pinus spp.), producing its fruit bodies on the soil beneath these hosts. Its range follows that of its pine associates across the circumpolar boreal forest, although it becomes rather scarce north of the Arctic Circle. The fungus is considered endangered in Switzerland.
