= Sarcodon quietus =

Scientific classification
- Domain: Eukaryota
- Kingdom: Fungi
- Division: Basidiomycota
- Class: Agaricomycetes
- Order: Thelephorales
- Family: Bankeraceae
- Genus: Sarcodon
- Species: S. quietus

Binomial name
- Sarcodon quietus Maas Geest. (1967)

Species of fungus

Sarcodon quietus is a species of tooth fungus in the family Bankeraceae. Found in the Congo, it was described as new to science in 1967 by Dutch mycologist Rudolph Arnold Maas Geesteranus.
