= Sarcodon dissimulans =

Scientific classification
- Kingdom: Fungi
- Division: Basidiomycota
- Class: Agaricomycetes
- Order: Thelephorales
- Family: Bankeraceae
- Genus: Sarcodon
- Species: S. dissimulans

Binomial name
- Sarcodon dissimulans K.A.Harrison (1984)

Synonyms
- Hydnellum dissimulans (K.A.Harrison) Stalpers (1993)

Species of fungus

Sarcodon dissimulans is a species of tooth fungus in the family Bankeraceae. Found in Nova Scotia, Canada, it was described as new to science in 1984 by mycologist Kenneth A. Harrison. It is characterized as having an "extremely nauseating" taste. Its spores are roughly spherical to oblong, measuring 5–6 by 4–5 μm.
