= Sarcodon lanuginosus =

Scientific classification
- Domain: Eukaryota
- Kingdom: Fungi
- Division: Basidiomycota
- Class: Agaricomycetes
- Order: Thelephorales
- Family: Bankeraceae
- Genus: Sarcodon
- Species: S. lanuginosus

Binomial name
- Sarcodon lanuginosus (K.A.Harrison) K.A.Harrison (1984)

Synonyms
- Hydnum lanuginosum K.A.Harrison (1961)

Species of fungus

Sarcodon lanuginosus is a species of tooth fungus in the family Bankeraceae. It was described as new to science in 1961 by mycologist Kenneth A. Harrison, who initially called it Hydnum lanuginosum. He transferred it to the genus Sarcodon in 1984. It is found in Nova Scotia, Canada, where it fruits on the ground singly or in groups under spruce and fir. The type collection was made in Cape Split, Kings County.

The fungus has fruit bodies with irregularly shaped, shaggy caps measuring 3–15 cm (1.2–5.9 in) in diameter, supported by a smooth, greyish stipe. Conditions of high humidity can result in reddish or pinkish drops appearing on the stipe. The spores of S. lanuginosus are roughly spherical, covered in small warts (tubercules), and measure 4.5–6 by 4.5–5 μm.
