= Sarcodon cyrneus =

Scientific classification
- Domain: Eukaryota
- Kingdom: Fungi
- Division: Basidiomycota
- Class: Agaricomycetes
- Order: Thelephorales
- Family: Bankeraceae
- Genus: Sarcodon
- Species: S. cyrneus

Binomial name
- Sarcodon cyrneus Maas Geest. (1975)

Species of fungus

Sarcodon cyrneus is a species of tooth fungus in the family Bankeraceae. Found in Europe, it was described as new to science in 1975 by Dutch mycologist Rudolph Arnold Maas Geesteranus. The specific epithet cyrneus is derived from the Latin "Corsican", referring to Corsica, the type locality. Fruit bodies contains neurotrophic cyathane diterpene compounds called cyrneines.
