= Sarcodon ussuriensis =

Scientific classification
- Domain: Eukaryota
- Kingdom: Fungi
- Division: Basidiomycota
- Class: Agaricomycetes
- Order: Thelephorales
- Family: Bankeraceae
- Genus: Sarcodon
- Species: S. ussuriensis

Binomial name
- Sarcodon ussuriensis Nikol. (1961)

Species of fungus

Sarcodon ussuriensis is a species of tooth fungus in the family Bankeraceae. Taisiya Lvovna Nikolayeva described the species as new to science in 1961 from collections made in what was then called the USSR.
