= Sarcodon umbilicatus =

Scientific classification
- Domain: Eukaryota
- Kingdom: Fungi
- Division: Basidiomycota
- Class: Agaricomycetes
- Order: Thelephorales
- Family: Bankeraceae
- Genus: Sarcodon
- Species: S. umbilicatus

Binomial name
- Sarcodon umbilicatus A.Grupe, T.J.Baroni & D.J.Lodge (2015)

Species of fungus

Sarcodon umbilicatus is a species of tooth fungus in the family Bankeraceae. Found in Belize, where it grows on the ground under oaks in mountainous cloud forest, it was described as new to science in 2015.
