= Sarcodon subfelleus =

Scientific classification
- Domain: Eukaryota
- Kingdom: Fungi
- Division: Basidiomycota
- Class: Agaricomycetes
- Order: Thelephorales
- Family: Bankeraceae
- Genus: Sarcodon
- Species: S. subfelleus

Binomial name
- Sarcodon subfelleus (K.A.Harrison) K.A.Harrison (1984)

Synonyms
- Hydnum subfelleum K.A.Harrison (1961)

Species of fungus

Sarcodon subfelleus is a species of tooth fungus in the family Bankeraceae. It was described as new to science in 1961 by mycologist Kenneth A. Harrison, who initially called it Hydnum subfelleum. He transferred it to the genus Sarcodon in 1984. It is found in Nova Scotia, Canada, where it fruits on the ground singly or in groups under spruce and fir. The type collection was made in Glenmont, Kings County.

The fungus makes fruit bodies with convex to irregularly shaped caps measuring 4–17 cm (1.6–6.7 in) in diameter, supported by a stout stipe measuring 1–9 cm (0.4–3.5 in) long by 1–4 cm (0.4–1.6 in) thick. The spines on the underside of the cap are variable in length, up to a maximum of 7 mm long. They are light grayish-brown with white tips, but darken when bruised. The spores of S. subfelleus are roughly spherical to angular, covered in small, coarse warts (tubercules), and measure 5–6 by 4–5.5 μm.
