= Sarcodon cyanellus =

Scientific classification
- Domain: Eukaryota
- Kingdom: Fungi
- Division: Basidiomycota
- Class: Agaricomycetes
- Order: Thelephorales
- Family: Bankeraceae
- Genus: Sarcodon
- Species: S. cyanellus

Binomial name
- Sarcodon cyanellus K.A.Harrison 1984

Synonyms
- Hydnum cyanellum K.A.Harrison 1964

Species of fungus

Sarcodon cyanellus is a species of tooth fungus in the family Bankeraceae. Found in the Pacific Northwest region of North America, where it associates with Pinaceae, it was described as new to science in 1964 by mycologist Kenneth A. Harrison, who initially called it Hydnum cyanellum. He transferred it to the genus Sarcodon in 1984. It has a vinaceous-violet to bluish-black cap.
