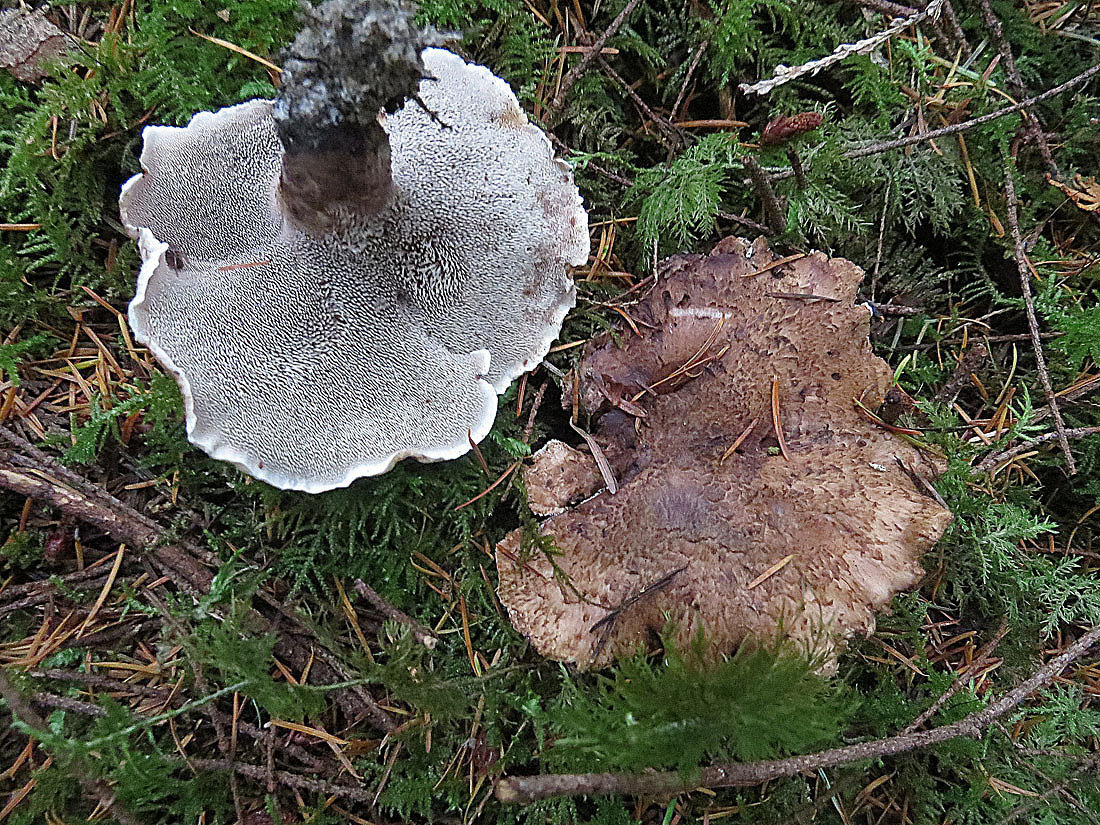

Scientific classification
- Kingdom: Fungi
- Division: Basidiomycota
- Class: Agaricomycetes
- Order: Thelephorales
- Family: Bankeraceae
- Genus: Sarcodon
- Species: S. calvatus

Binomial name
- Sarcodon calvatus (K.A.Harrison) K.A.Harrison (1984)

Synonyms
- Hydnum calvatum K.A.Harrison (1964)

= Sarcodon calvatus =

Species of fungus

Sarcodon calvatus, commonly known as the robust hedgehog, is a species of tooth fungus in the family Bankeraceae. It was described as new to science in 1964 by mycologist Kenneth A. Harrison, who initially called it Hydnum calvatum. He transferred it to the genus Sarcodon in 1984.

The pale to pinkish or tannish cap can grow up to an extreme of 35 centimetres (14 in) across. The surface stains blue-green to black in KOH.

It is found in North America.
