= Sarcodon catalaunicus =

Scientific classification
- Domain: Eukaryota
- Kingdom: Fungi
- Division: Basidiomycota
- Class: Agaricomycetes
- Order: Thelephorales
- Family: Bankeraceae
- Genus: Sarcodon
- Species: S. catalaunicus

Binomial name
- Sarcodon catalaunicus Maire (1937)

Species of fungus

Sarcodon catalaunicus is a species of tooth fungus in the family Bankeraceae. Described as a new species in 1937, it is found in Catalonian woodlands (Spain), where it forms mycorrhizal relationships with oak trees in well-drained, nutrient-poor substrates.

== Taxonomy ==
The fungus was described as new to science in 1937 by the French mycologist René Maire. The type collection was found growing under Quercus ilex in Santa Coloma de Farners (Catalonia, Spain).

== Description ==
Sarcodon catalaunicus is a terrestrial fungus characterised by its distinctive carpophore (fruiting body) structure. The fruiting body comprises a cap and stipe with specialised spines underneath. The cap is dry to the touch and grows to 2–3 cm in diameter, with a minutely scaly surface that is brown or grey-brown in colour. It has an irregularly shaped margin that may be wavy or split.

The spines on the underside of the cap are about 4–6 mm long and appear white to greyish-brown when mature. These structures give the species its characteristic tooth-like appearance, typical of the genus Sarcodon. The flesh is thin and flexible at the cap margins but becomes more solid towards the centre.

The stem measures 2–3 cm tall and 2–3 mm in diameter. It is slender and slightly curved, with a smooth surface that may have a subtle purple-brown tint, though this feature is sometimes notably absent. The base of the stem lacks the bulbous swelling seen in some related species.

Microscopically, S. catalaunicus produces ellipsoid spores measuring about 5 by 4–5 micrometres. These basidiospores have distinctly roughened walls and appear light greyish-brown in colour. They contain large oil droplets visible under high magnification. The spore structures cannot be seen with ammonia staining but show a positive amyloid reaction when treated with iodine-based reagents.

== Habitat and distribution ==
Sarcodon catalaunicus was first discovered growing in association with evergreen oak (Quercus ilex) and pubescent oak (Quercus lanuginosa) near Santa Coloma de Farnés in the Catalonia region of Spain. The species shows a strong preference for acidic sandy soils characteristic of Mediterranean ecosystems. The fungus forms mycorrhizal relationships with oak species, particularly those from the evergreen oak group. The type specimens were collected from acidic sandy soils, indicating the species' preference for well-drained, nutrient-poor substrates typical of Mediterranean oak woodlands.
