= Sarcodon roseolus =

Scientific classification
- Domain: Eukaryota
- Kingdom: Fungi
- Division: Basidiomycota
- Class: Agaricomycetes
- Order: Thelephorales
- Family: Bankeraceae
- Genus: Sarcodon
- Species: S. roseolus

Binomial name
- Sarcodon roseolus Banker (1913)

Synonyms
- Hydnum roseolum (Banker) Trotter (1913)

Species of fungus

Sarcodon roseolus is a species of tooth fungus in the family Bankeraceae. Found in North America, it was described as new to science in 1913 by mycologist Howard James Banker, who collected the type specimens in North Carolina.
