= Sarcodon austrofibulatus =

Scientific classification
- Domain: Eukaryota
- Kingdom: Fungi
- Division: Basidiomycota
- Class: Agaricomycetes
- Order: Thelephorales
- Family: Bankeraceae
- Genus: Sarcodon
- Species: S. austrofibulatus

Binomial name
- Sarcodon austrofibulatus Douch, L.J. Vaughan & T.W. May

Species of fungus

Sarcodon austrofibulatus is a species of mushroom in the family Bankeraceae. It was described by James K. Douch, Luke J. Vaughan, and Tom W. May in 2024. The specific epithet refers to presence of clamp connections. The type locality is Wombat State Forest, Australia.

== See also ==
- Fungi of Australia
