= Sarcodon ustalis =

Scientific classification
- Domain: Eukaryota
- Kingdom: Fungi
- Division: Basidiomycota
- Class: Agaricomycetes
- Order: Thelephorales
- Family: Bankeraceae
- Genus: Sarcodon
- Species: S. ustalis

Binomial name
- Sarcodon ustalis (K.A.Harrison) K.A.Harrison (1984)

Synonyms
- Hydnum ustale K.A.Harrison (1964)

Species of fungus

Sarcodon ustalis is a species of tooth fungus in the family Bankeraceae. It was described as new to science in 1964 by mycologist Kenneth A. Harrison, who initially called it Hydnum ustalie. He transferred it to the genus Sarcodon in 1984. It is found in Michigan, where it fruits on the ground in groups under Jack Pine (Pinus banksiana). The type was collected by Ingrid Bartelli in Marquette, Michigan.

The fungus makes fruit bodies with flat to depressed caps measuring 6–15 cm (2.4–5.9 in) in diameter, supported by a short stipe measuring 3–5 cm (1.2–2.0 in) long by 1–1.5 cm (0.4–0.6 in) thick. The spines on the underside of the cap are measure 3–6 mm long. Initially white, they become brownish in age. The flesh has a "disagreeable" odor, with a "hint of cinnamon". Spores of S. ustalis are roughly spherical, covered in small, coarse warts (tubercules) up to 1.5 μm, and measure 6.5–8 by 5.5–7 μm. The color of the spore print ranges from avellaneous (dull grayish brown) to "pale dingy cinnamon buff".
