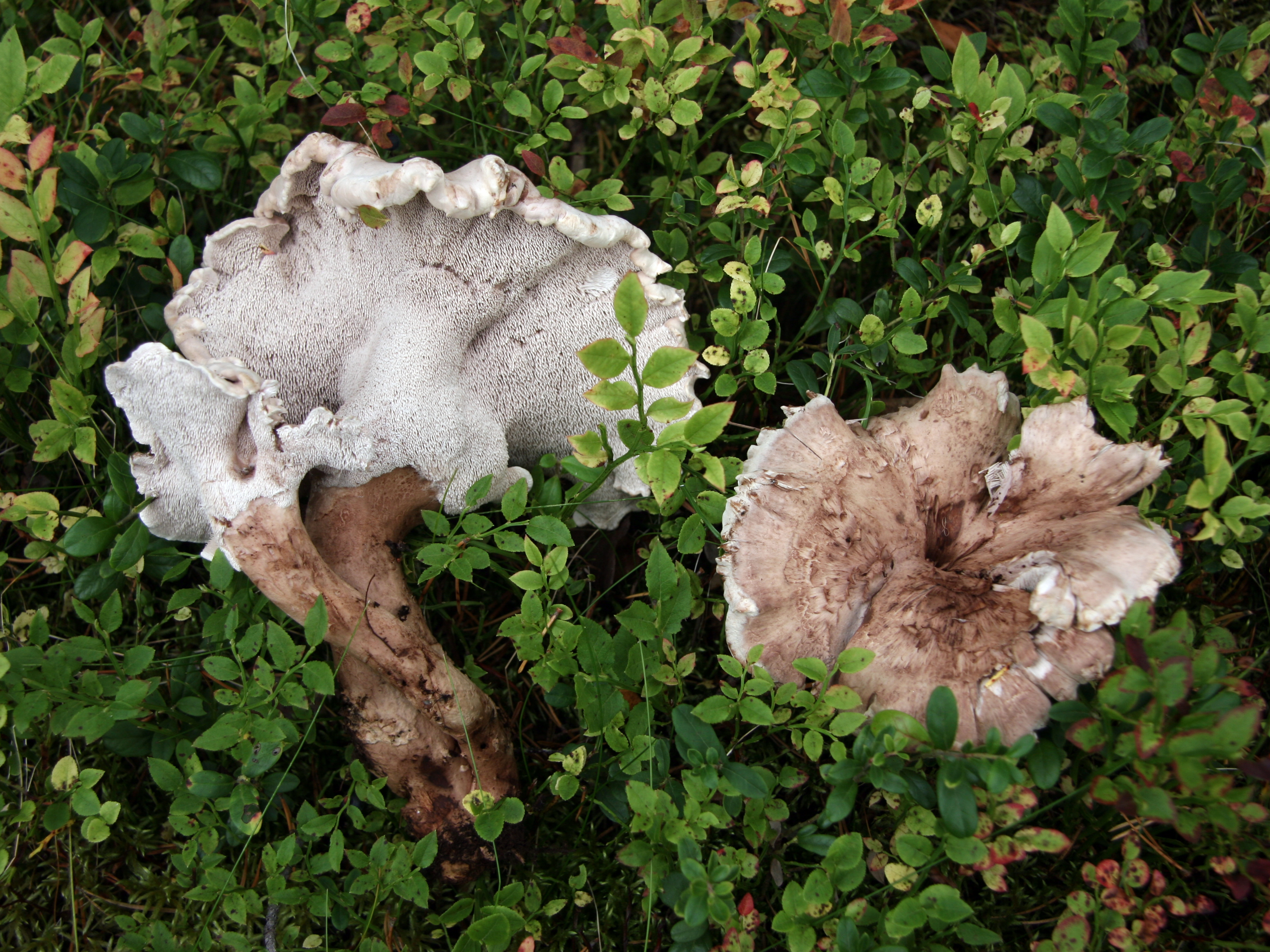
- Bankera violascens

Scientific classification
- Kingdom: Fungi
- Division: Basidiomycota
- Class: Agaricomycetes
- Order: Thelephorales
- Family: Bankeraceae
- Genus: Bankera; Coker & Beers ex Pouzar (1955)

Type species
- Bankera fuligineoalba (J.C.Schmidt) Coker & Beers ex Pouzar (1955)

Species
- B. cinerea B. fuligineoalba B. mollis B. violascens

= Bankera =

Genus of fungi

Bankera is a genus of four species of tooth fungi in the family Bankeraceae. The genus was first circumscribed in 1951 by William Chambers Coker and Alma Holland Beers, but this publication was invalid according to the rules of botanical nomenclature. It was later published validly by Zdeněk Pouzar in 1955. The type species is B. fuligineoalba. The genus is ectomycorrhizal with gymnosperms, usually with trees from the pine family.

Fruitbodies of Bankera species are fleshy, usually with a centrally-placed stipe, and greyish-brown spines on the hymenial undersurface. The texture of the flesh ranges from soft to tough, but it lacks the zones associated with some other Bankeraceae genera. Dried flesh often has a fenugreek odor. Spores range in shape from more or less spherical to ellipsoid, and are hyaline (translucent), with thin walls. In deposit, they are white. Bankera has a monomitic hyphal system with brownish to hyaline, inflated generative hyphae.

In 2013, based on molecular and morphological evidence, Richard Baird proposed that the type species Bankera fuligineoalba be transferred into the genus Phellodon, as Phellodon fuligineoalbus.

== Species ==
- Bankera cinerea
- Bankera fuligineoalba
- Bankera mollis
- Bankera violascens
