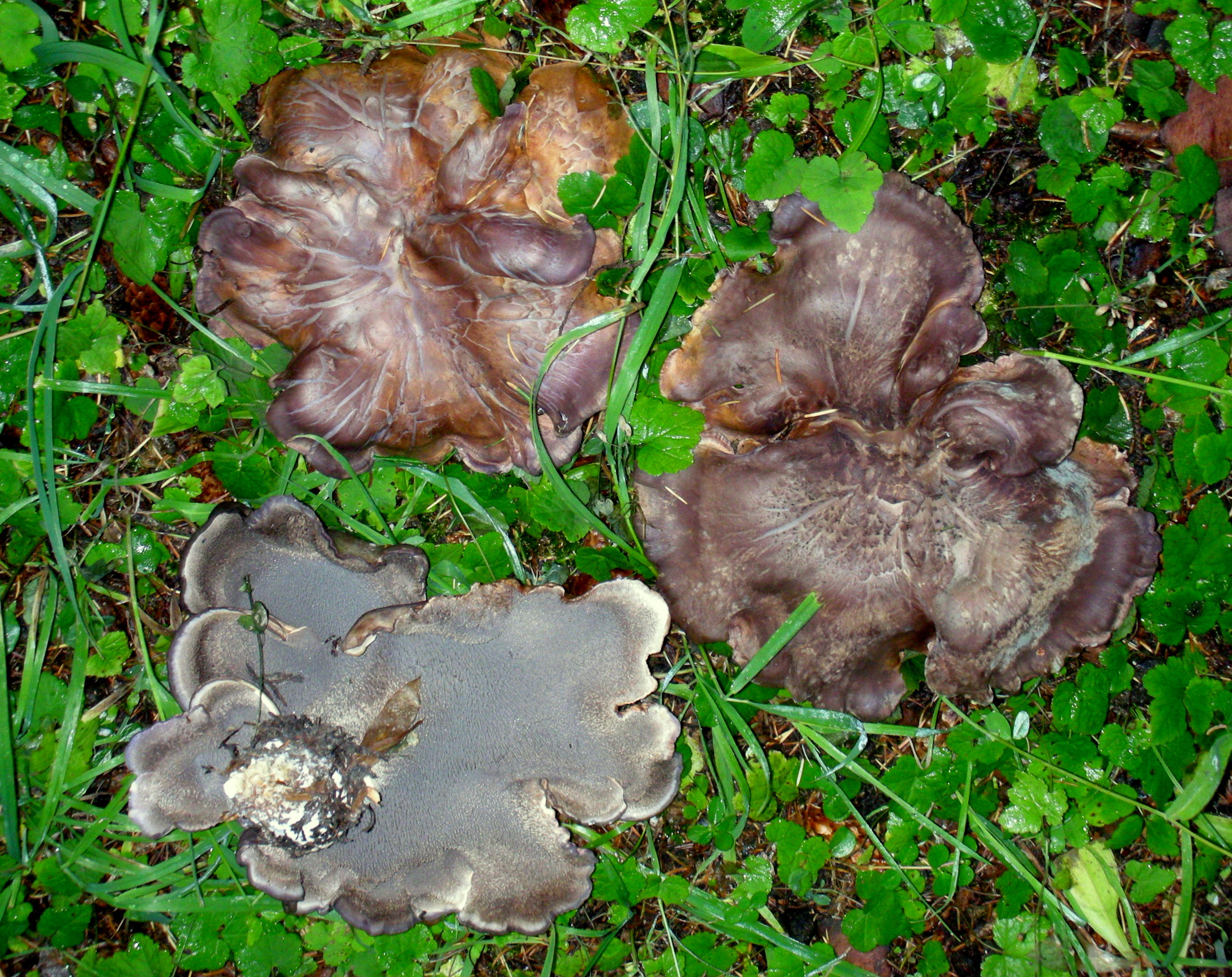

Scientific classification
- Domain: Eukaryota
- Kingdom: Fungi
- Division: Basidiomycota
- Class: Agaricomycetes
- Order: Thelephorales
- Family: Bankeraceae
- Genus: Sarcodon
- Species: S. rimosus

Binomial name
- Sarcodon rimosus (K.A.Harrison) K.A.Harrison (1984)

Synonyms
- Hydnum rimosum K.A.Harrison (1964)

= Sarcodon rimosus =

Species of fungus

Sarcodon rimosus, commonly known as the cracked hydnum, is a species of tooth fungus in the family Bankeraceae. Found in the Pacific Northwest region of North America, it was described as new to science in 1964 by mycologist Kenneth A. Harrison, who initially called it Hydnum rimosum. He transferred it to the genus Sarcodon in 1984. Fruit bodies of S. rimosum have convex to somewhat depressed caps that are 4–12 cm (1.6–4.7 in) in diameter. The surface becomes scaly in age, often developing conspicuous cracks and fissures. It is brown with violet tints. The flesh lacks any significant taste and odor. Underneath the cap cuticle, the flesh turns a bluish-green color when tested with a solution of potassium hydroxide. The brownish-pinks spines on the cap underside are typically 2.5–7 mm long, extending decurrently on the stipe. Spores are roughly spherical with fine warts on the surface, and measure 5–6.5 by 4.5–5 μm. The hyphae do not have clamp connections.

Sarcodon rimosus is common in the states of Idaho, Oregon, and Washington, where it fruits in groups under pines, or in coniferous forest. Fruiting occurs in late summer and autumn.
