= Sarcodon scabripes =

Scientific classification
- Domain: Eukaryota
- Kingdom: Fungi
- Division: Basidiomycota
- Class: Agaricomycetes
- Order: Thelephorales
- Family: Bankeraceae
- Genus: Sarcodon
- Species: S. scabripes

Binomial name
- Sarcodon scabripes (Peck) Banker (1906)

Synonyms
- Hydnum scabripes Peck (1896)

Species of fungus

Sarcodon scabripes is a species of fungus in the family Bankeraceae found in Asia, Europe, and North America. It was originally described in 1897 as Hydnum scabripes by Charles Horton Peck. Howard James Banker transferred it to the genus Sarcodon in 1906. The fungus makes fruit bodies with a drab gray to flesh-colored cap, and flesh that is white. In addition to the United States, where it was first documented, S. scabripes has been reported from Japan and the Sverdlovsk Oblast region of Russia.
