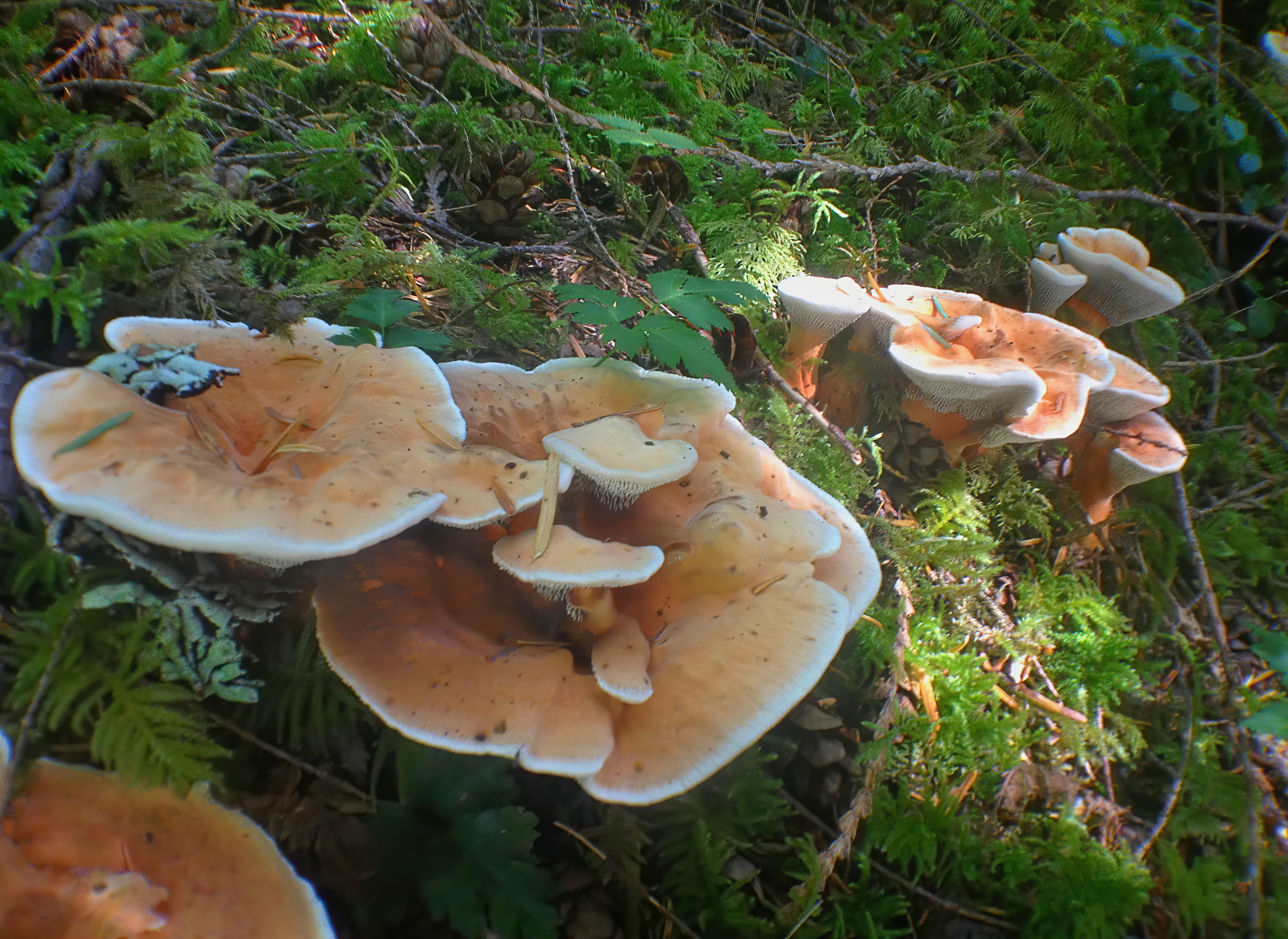

Scientific classification
- Kingdom: Fungi
- Division: Basidiomycota
- Class: Agaricomycetes
- Order: Thelephorales
- Family: Bankeraceae
- Genus: Hydnellum
- Species: H. aurantiacum

Binomial name
- Hydnellum aurantiacum (Batsch) P. Karst. (1879)

Synonyms
- Hydnum suberosum var. aurantiacum Batsch (1789); Hydnum aurantiacum (Batsch) Alb. & Schwein. (1825); Hydnum stohlii Rabenh. (1873); Calodon aurantiacus (Batsch) P.Karst. (1881); Phaeodon aurantiacus (Batsch) J.Schröt. (1888); Hydnellum complectipes D.Hall (1972)

= Hydnellum aurantiacum =

Species of fungus

Hydnellum aurantiacum
- Mycological characteristics
- Teeth on hymenium
- Cap is flat or depressed
- Stipe is bare
- Spore print is brown
- Ecology is mycorrhizal
- Edibility is inedible

Hydnellum aurantiacum is a species of fungus, commonly known as the orange spine or orange hydnellum for its reddish orange or rusty red colored fruit bodies. Like other tooth fungi, it bears a layer of spines rather than gills on the underside of the cap. The species is listed as critically endangered in the United Kingdom. It is inedible.

== Taxonomy ==
Hydnellum aurantiacum was first described by the German naturalist August Batsch in 1789, with the name Hydnum suberosum var. aurantiacum. It was given its current scientific name by Petter Karsten, who transferred it to Hydnellum in 1879. Hydnellum aurantiacum has acquired several synonyms in its taxonomic history, including Hydnum stohlii, published by Gottlob Ludwig Rabenhorst in 1873, and Hydnellum complectipes, published by Hall in 1972. Additional synonyms resulting from generic transfers include Hydnum aurantiacum (Johannes Baptista von Albertini and Lewis David de Schweinitz, 1825); Calodon aurantiacus (Karsten, 1881); and Phaeodon aurantiacus (Joseph Schröter, 1888).

The specific epithet aurantiacum is derived from the Latin for "orange". Common names for the fungus include "orange spine", "orange corky spine fungus", and the British Mycological Society approved English name "orange Hydnellum".

== Description ==
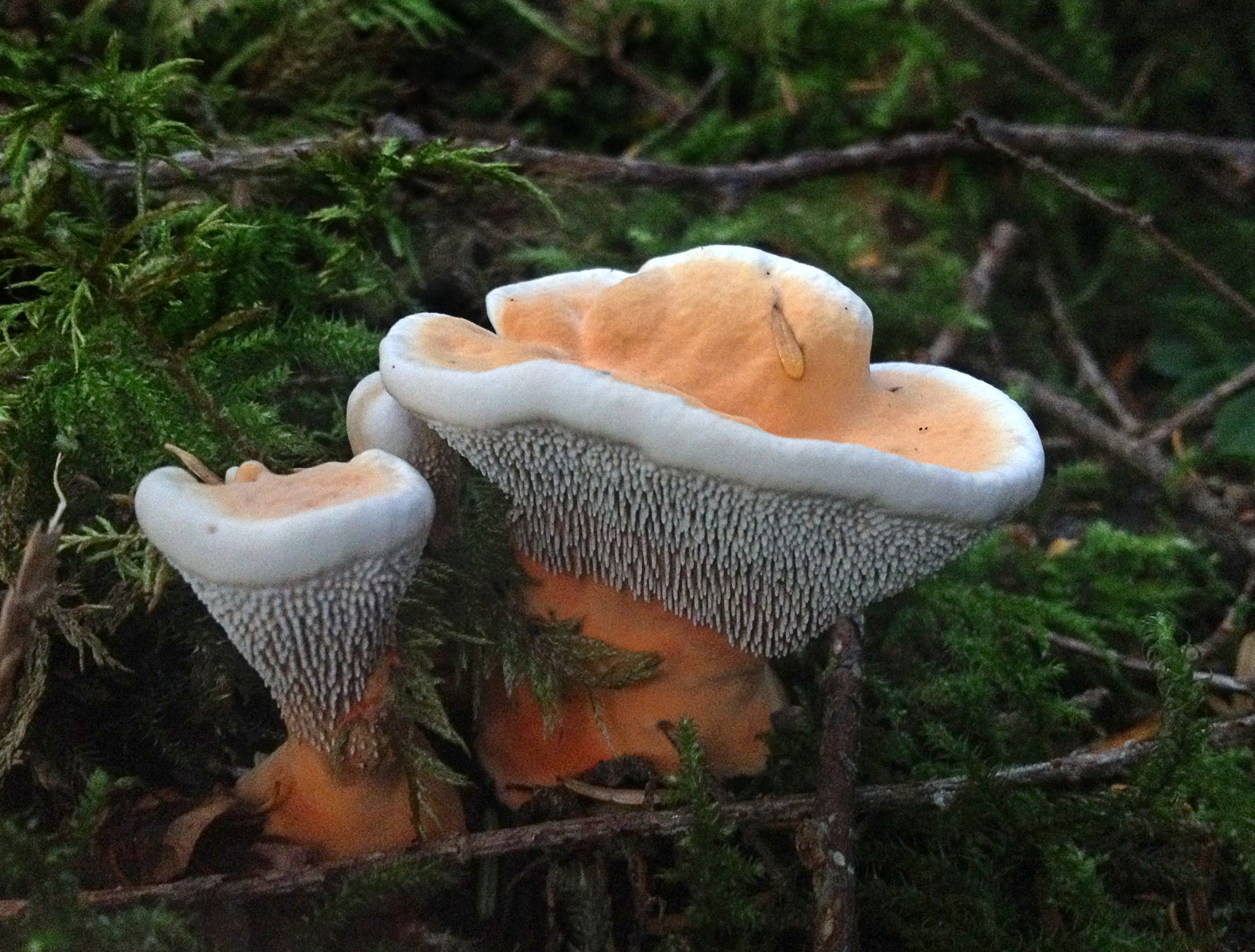
Young fruit body

The fruitbodies are shallowly funnel-shaped (infundibuliform) and up to 15 centimetres (6 in) in diameter. The upper surface is orange or orange-brown in the centre, with a lighter margin. It may be velvety or tomentose when young, but will become wrinkled or lumpy in age. The flesh is tough and woody, pale to dark orange-brown in color, without any distinctive odor but a bitter or mealy taste. The teeth are short (up to 5 mm long), white, but the tips gradually turn brown with age. The stipe is up to 4 cm long and 0.5–2 cm thick, orange to dark brown in color, with a velvety surface. The spore print is brown. This species is inedible due to the toughness of the flesh and its poor taste.

Basidia (the spore-bearing cells) are between 35 and 46 by 8–11 μm, club-shaped (clavate), without clamp connections, and four-spored. The sterigmata (extensions of the basidia bearing spores) may be up to 6 μm long. The spores are roughly spherical in shape, with rough warty outgrowths (tubercles), nonamyloid, and have dimensions of 5.5–8 by 5.5–6.5 μm.

=== Similar species ===
The species resembles the polypore Phaeolus schweinitzii when viewed from the top of the cap surface, but it has teeth instead of pores on the hymenium. Closely related and morphologically similar species in the genus Hydnellum include H. auratile (has more uniformly coloured flesh), H. caeruleum (may look similar in age), H. congenum (has thin flesh in the cap), H. ferrugipes, H. earlianum (has a smoother cap, and spines have sulfur-yellow tips, not white).

== Distribution and habitat ==
This species is typically found growing solitary or in clusters on the ground in conifer and mixed woods. Rarely, fruit bodies may have their stipes fused together. Hydnellum aurantiacum has been reported from Australia, Europe, North America, and Asia, including China India, and Korea. It is one of the most frequently encountered Thelephorales species found in the Sverdlovsk region of Russia.

== Conservation ==
Due to substantial declines in sightings, this species is listed as critically endangered in the United Kingdom.

== Chemistry ==
Skeletal formula of aurantiacin

The pigment responsible for the characteristic orange color of H. aurantiacum has been identified as the p-terphenyl compound named aurantiacin. This dark red pigment, a derivative of the compound atromentin, has subsequently been identified in other species of Hydnellum. The compounds dihydroaurantiacin dibenzoate and thelephoric acid have also been reported.

Hydnellum aurantiacum is used in mushroom dyeing, in which it produces grayish to greenish-gray colors depending on the mordant used.
