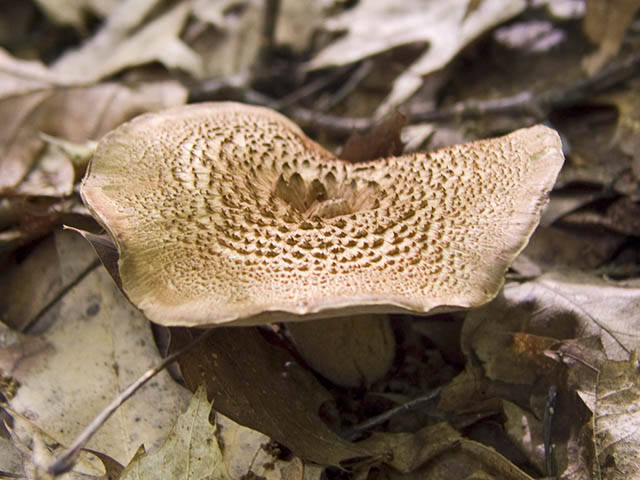

Scientific classification
- Domain: Eukaryota
- Kingdom: Fungi
- Division: Basidiomycota
- Class: Agaricomycetes
- Order: Thelephorales
- Family: Bankeraceae
- Genus: Hydnellum
- Species: H. underwoodii

Binomial name
- Hydnellum underwoodii (Banker) E.Larss., K.H.Larss. & Kõljalg

Synonyms
- Sarcodon fuligineoviolaceus Banker (1906); Hydnum underwoodii (Banker) Sacc. & Trotter (1912); Sarcodon murrillii Banker (1913); Sarcodon radicatus Banker (1913); Hydnum radicatum (Banker) Trotter (1925); Hydnum murrillii (Banker) Trotter (1925); Sarcodon underwoodii Banker (1906)

= Hydnellum underwoodii =

Species of fungus

Hydnellum underwoodii is an inedible species of tooth fungus in the family Bankeraceae. Found in North America, it was described as new to science in 1906 by American mycologist Howard James Banker. Its reddish-brown, convex to flattened cap measures 5–14 cm (2.0–5.5 in) in diameter. Reddish-brown, partially erect scales adorn the cap surface. Spines on the cap underside are 1–3 mm long; they are initially white, becoming brown with grayish tips in age. The oval to spherical spores are 6–7.5 by 5.5–6.5 μm. The fungus fruits singly or scattered, on the ground in coniferous forests.
