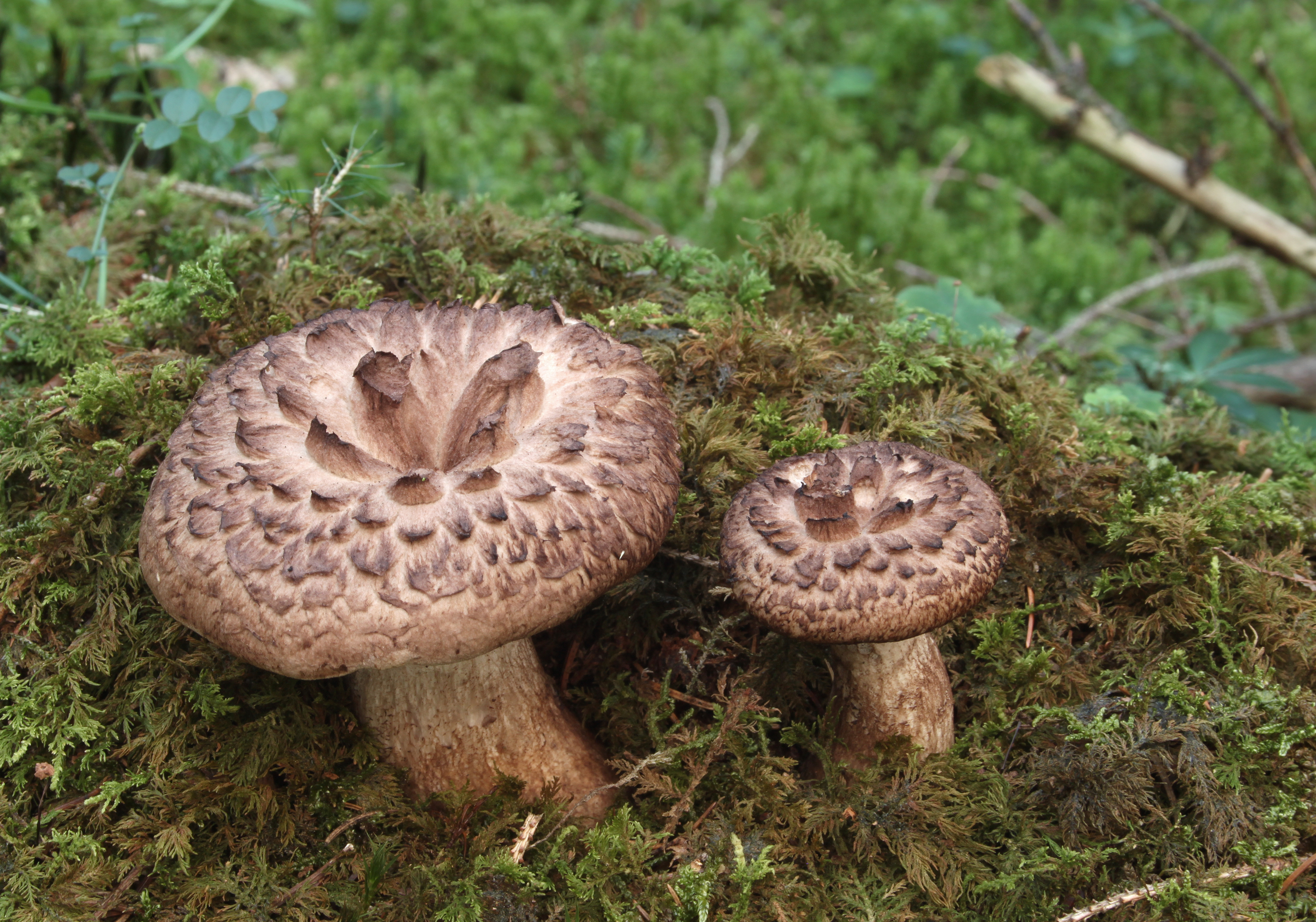

Scientific classification
- Kingdom: Fungi
- Division: Basidiomycota
- Class: Agaricomycetes
- Order: Thelephorales
- Family: Bankeraceae
- Genus: Sarcodon
- Species: S. imbricatus

Binomial name
- Sarcodon imbricatus (L.) P.Karst. (1881)

Synonyms
- Hydnum imbricatum L. (1753)

= Sarcodon imbricatus =

Sarcodon imbricatus Mycological characteristics
- Teeth on hymenium
- Cap is flat
- Hymenium is adnate
- Stipe is bare
- Spore print is brown
- Ecology is mycorrhizal
- Edibility is edible but not recommended

Sarcodon imbricatus, commonly known as the shingled hedgehog or scaly hedgehog, is a species of tooth fungus in the order Thelephorales. The mushroom has a large, brownish cap with large brown scales and may reach 30 cm (12 in) in diameter. On the underside it sports greyish, brittle teeth instead of gills, and has white flesh. Its spore print is brown.

It ranges throughout Europe and North America, while collections from the British Isles are now assigned to Sarcodon squamosus. It appears in autumn and is associated with spruce (Picea). The mushroom is edible, but it may be bitter and possibly causes gastrointestinal upset.

== Taxonomy ==
The Swedish botanist Olof Celsius reported in 1732 that Sarcodon imbricatus occurred in the vicinity of Uppsala, and Carl Linnaeus wrote of it in his 1737 work Flora lapponica. It was one of the species initially described by Linnaeus, as Hydnum imbricatum, in the second volume of his Species Plantarum in 1753. The specific epithet is the Latin imbricatus meaning "tiled" or "with overlapping tiles". It was then placed in the genus Sarcodon by Finnish mycologist Petter Adolf Karsten in 1881.

For many years, S. imbricatus was described associated with both spruce and pine, although the latter forms were smaller and noted to be more palatable by mushroom hunters in Norway. Furthermore, the mushroom has been used as a source of pigment and collectors noted that fresh specimens collected under pine yielded pigment, but only old ones collected under spruce. Molecular analysis of the DNA revealed the two forms to be distinct genetically, and thus populations of what had been described as S. imbricatus were now assigned to S. squamosus, which includes collections in the British Isles and the Netherlands.

== Description ==
The brownish or buff cap measures up to 15 centimetres (6 in) in diameter and is covered with coarse darker brown scales, becoming darker and upturned with age. It is funnel-shaped. The underside bears soft, pale grey 'teeth' rather than gills. These are 0.5–1.5 cm (1/4–5/8 in) long, grayish brown (darkening with age), and brittle. The pale grey or brown stipe may reach 10 cm (4 in) high and 4 cm (1 1/2 in) wide, may be narrower at the base, and is sometimes eccentric. The soft flesh is whitish to tan. The spores are brown.

=== Similar species ===
From above, it may be confused with Strobilomyces strobilaceus as both have a similar shaggy cap. The bitter and inedible Sarcodon amarascens can be distinguished by its bluish-black stripe. The bitter Hydnellum scabrosum (formerly placed in Sarcodon) has a turquoise-tinted base.

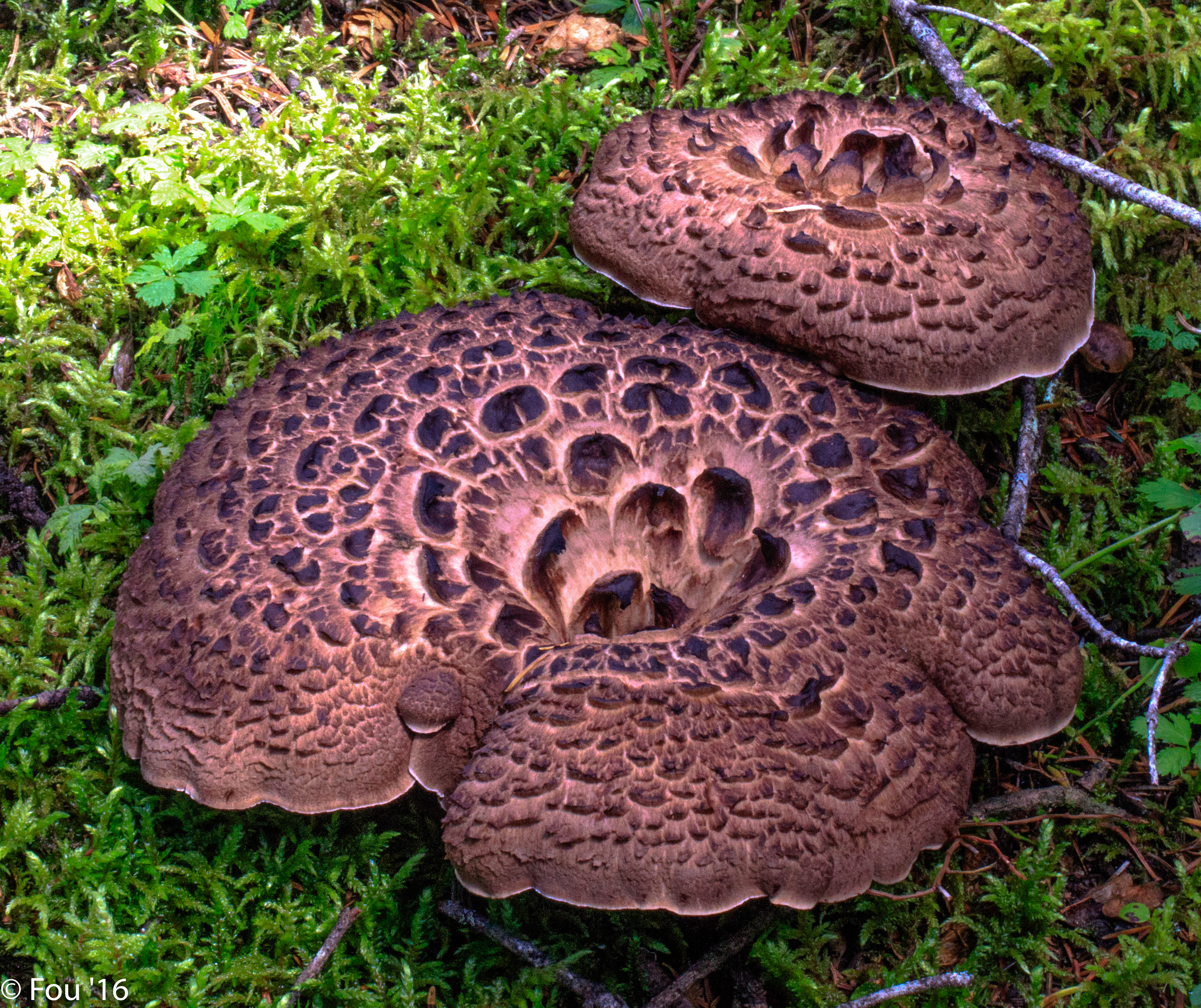

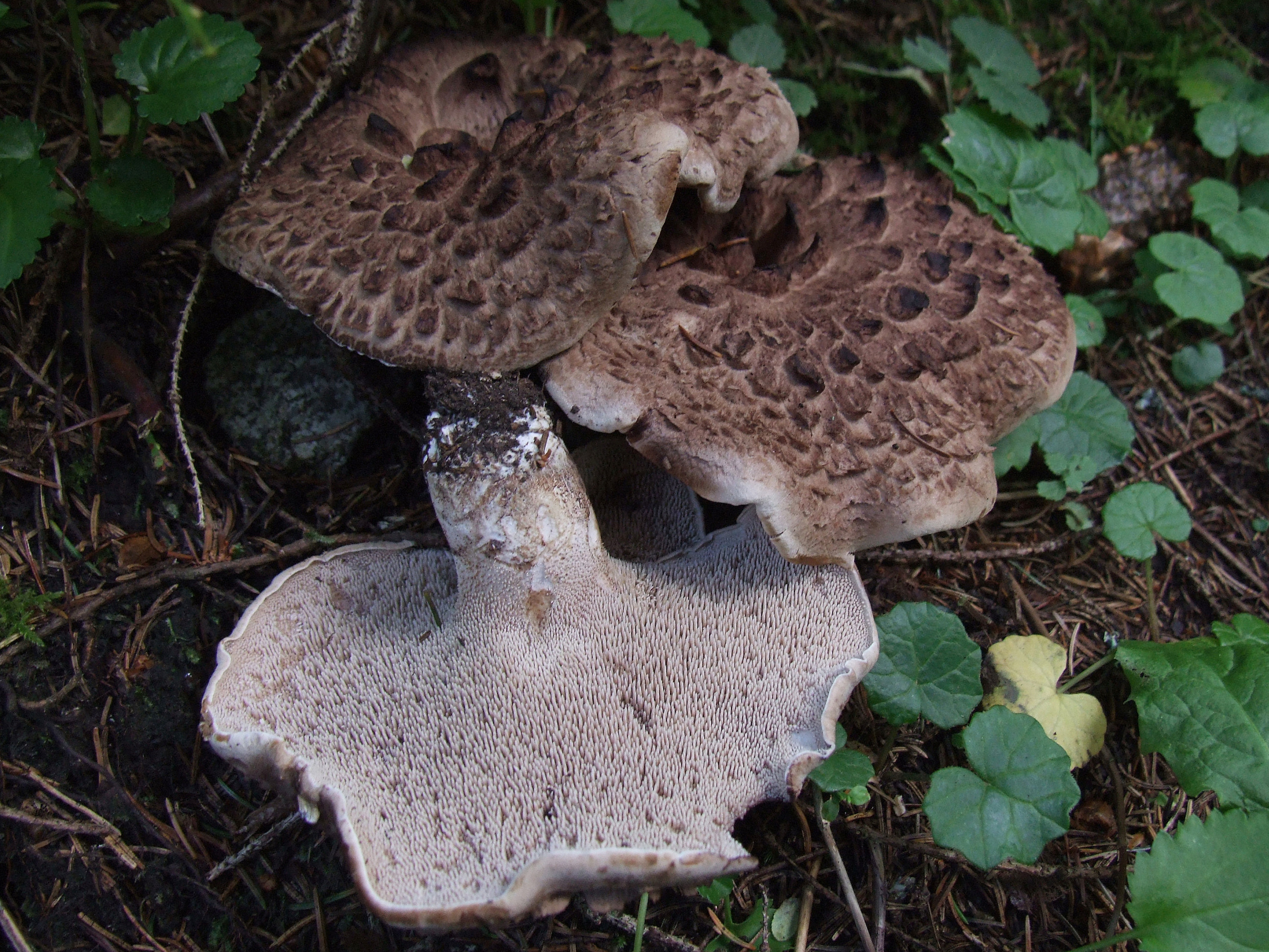

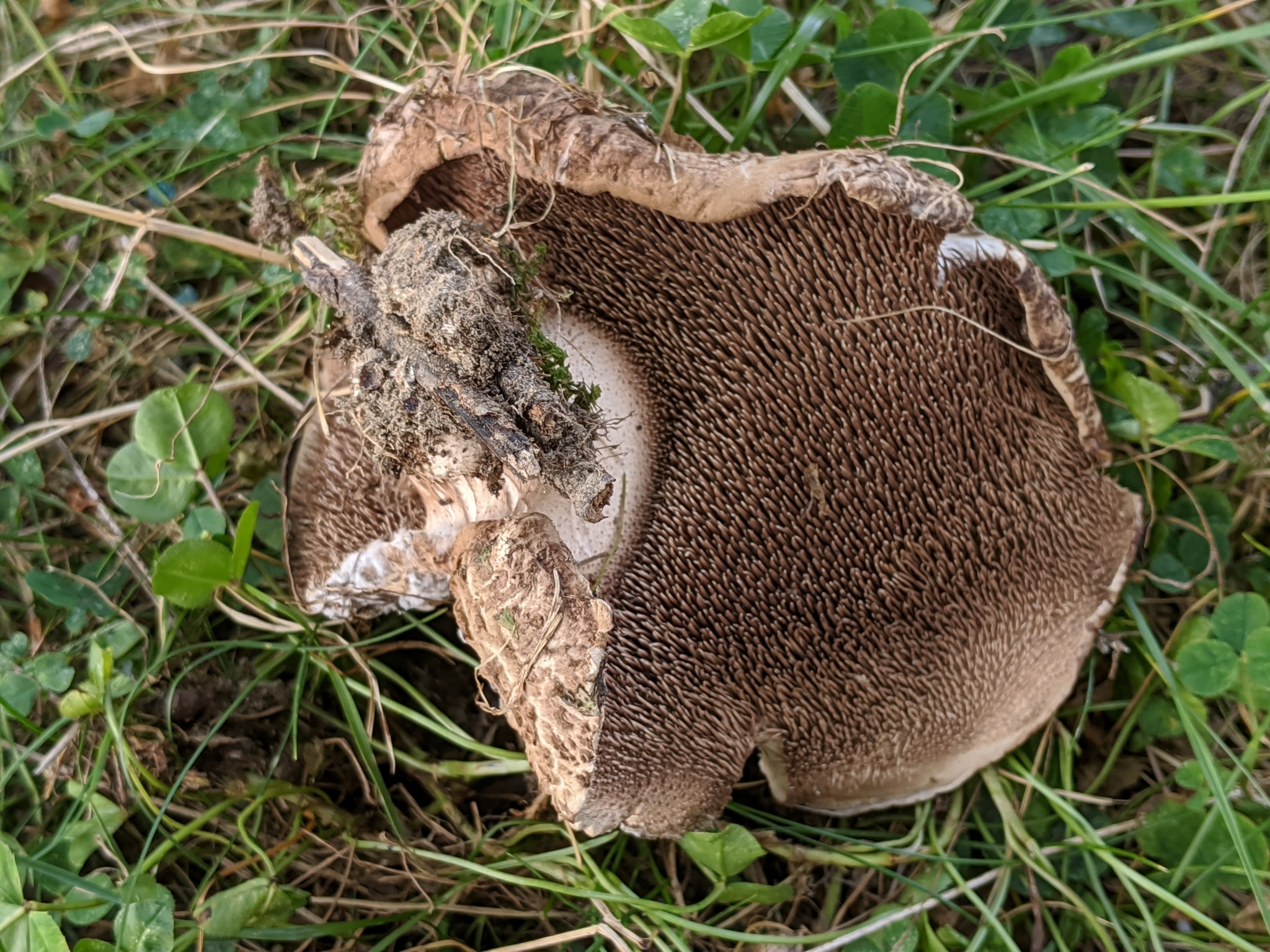
The "teeth" under the cap

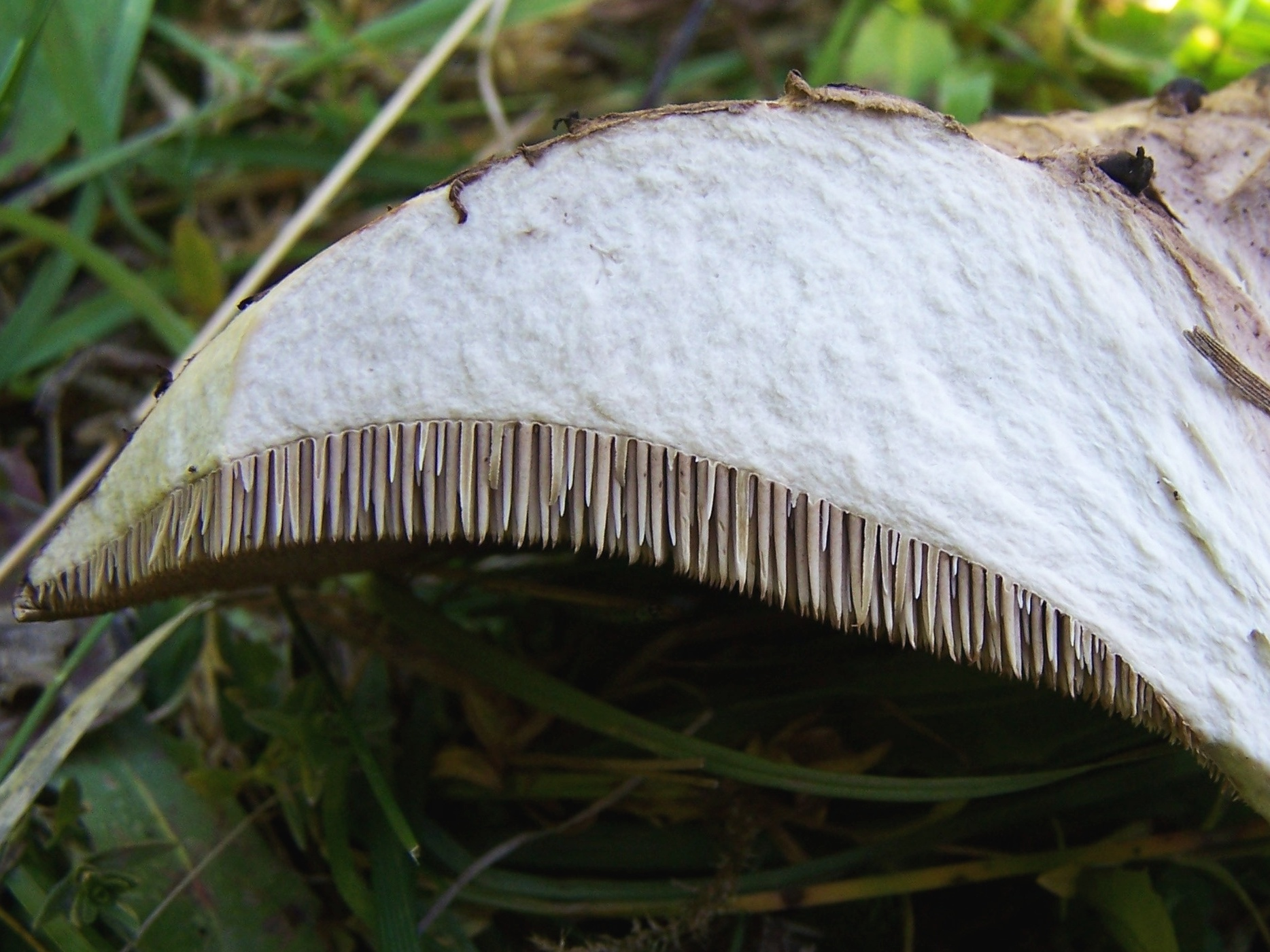

== Distribution and habitat ==
The species is distributed throughout Europe and North America, but collections from the British Isles are now assigned to S. squamosus. In Europe, S. imbricatus fruits from August to October. In North America, it fruits from July to September except on the West Coast, where it appears from September to December.

The species can appear on sandy or chalk soils in fairy rings. It grows in association with firs (Abies), especially in hilly or mountainous areas.

== Uses ==
=== Culinary ===
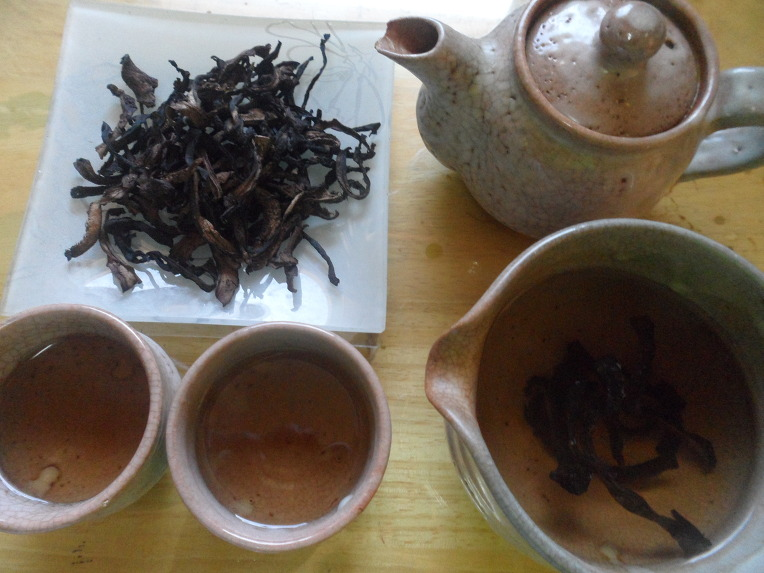
Neungi-cha (scaly hedgehog tea)

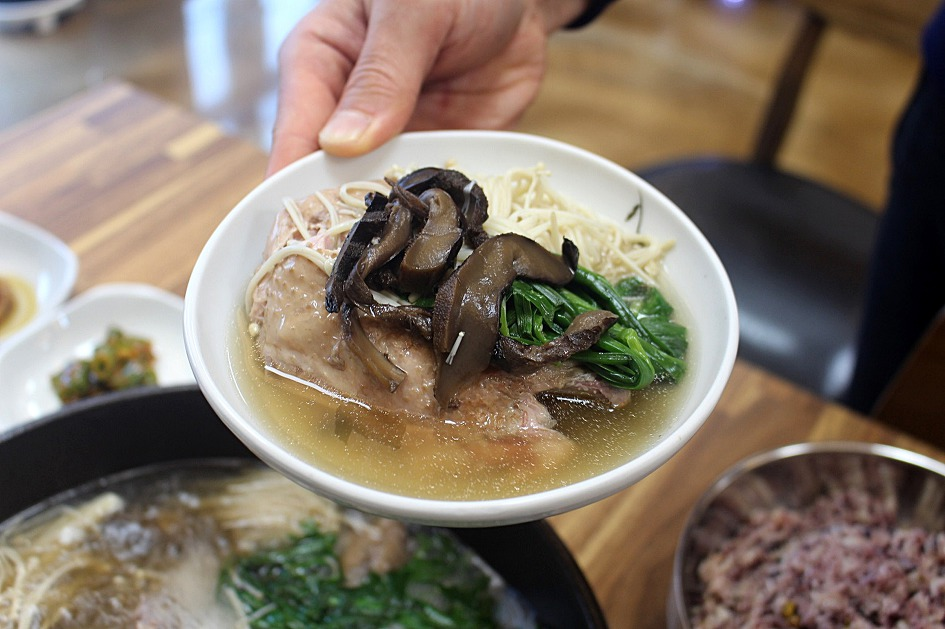
In a bowl of baeksuk

Some sources (in the United States) report that the fungus is edible but of poor quality; some others consider it edible and delicious. It may cause gastrointestinal upset. The mushrooms can be bitter, especially older specimens. This can be mitigated by submerging them in boiling water. Some suspect that bitter specimens may actually be related species.

The mushroom can be pickled or dried and used as flavouring. In Bulgaria, it is collected, dried and finely ground to be used as an aromatic mushroom flour.

In Korea, mushroom tea is made from it.

The distinctive spicy aroma of fried younger specimens has made it an expensive delicacy in Japan.

=== Other uses ===
Old mushrooms of S. imbricatus and related species contain blue-green pigments, which are used for dyeing wool in Norway.
