= Roseolus =

Roseolus may refer to:

- Rhizopogon roseolus, species of fungus
- Sarcodon roseolus, species of tooth fungus
- Streptomyces roseolus, species of bacterium
