= Corneroporus =

Scientific classification
- Kingdom: Fungi
- Division: Basidiomycota
- Class: Agaricomycetes
- Order: Thelephorales
- Family: Bankeraceae
- Genus: Corneroporus; T.Hatt (2001)

Type species
- Corneroporus subcitrinus (Corner) T.Hatt (2001)

Synonyms
- Boletopsis subcitrina Corner (1989)

Genus of fungi

Corneroporus is a fungal genus in the family Bankeraceae. It is monotypic, containing the single species Corneroporus subcitrinus, found in Malaysia. This fungus was originally described in the genus Boletopsis by mycologist E. J. H. Corner in 1989.
