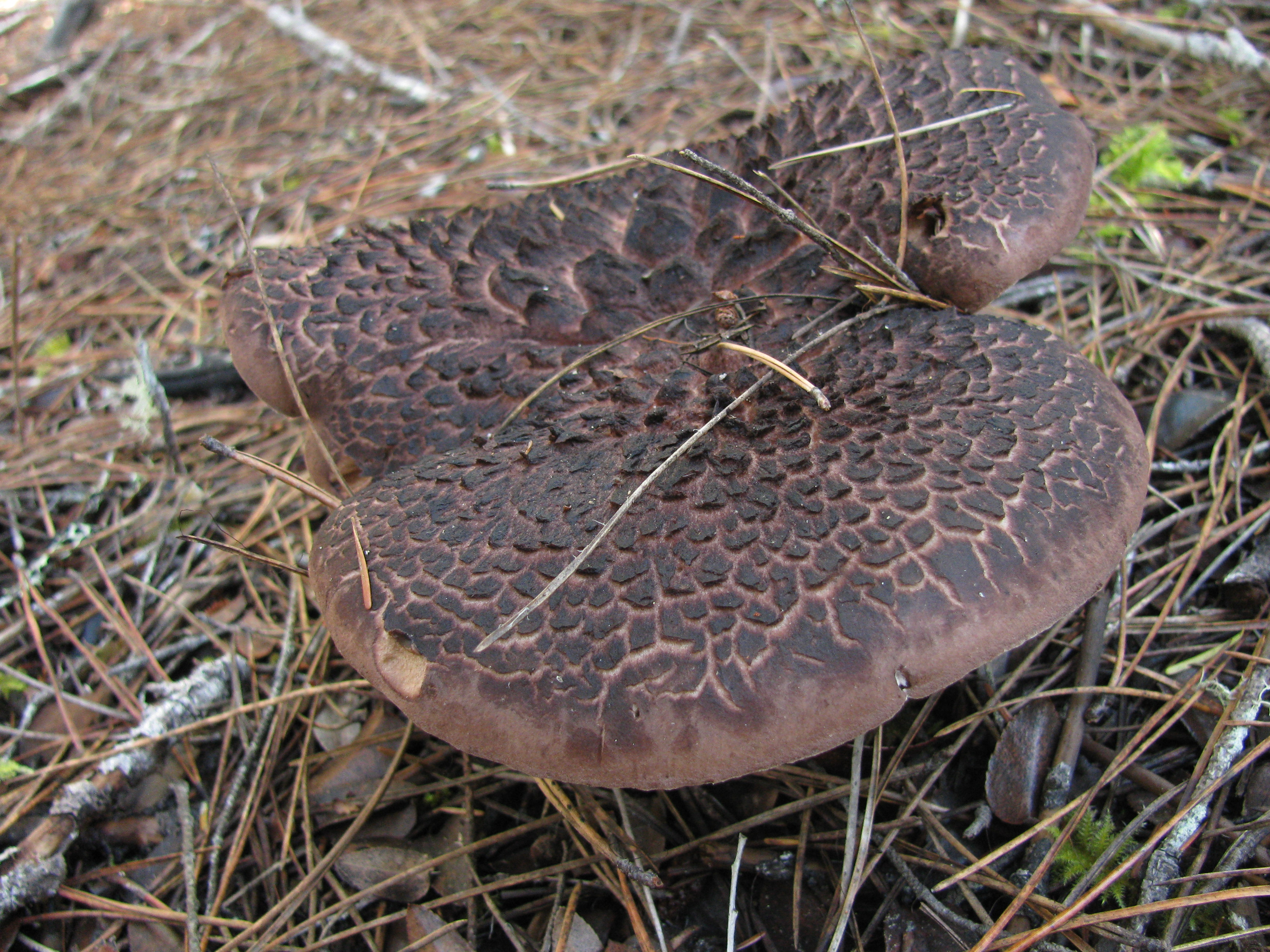

Scientific classification
- Domain: Eukaryota
- Kingdom: Fungi
- Division: Basidiomycota
- Class: Agaricomycetes
- Order: Thelephorales
- Family: Bankeraceae
- Genus: Sarcodon
- Species: S. squamosus

Binomial name
- Sarcodon squamosus (Schaeff.) P.Karst (1889)

Synonyms
- Hydnum squamosumSchaeff. (1774)

= Sarcodon squamosus =

Species of fungus

Sarcodon squamosus is a species of basidiomycete fungus in the genus Sarcodon.

== Description ==
It is an edible mushroom that was previously regarded as a subspecies of Sarcodon imbricatus. For many years, S. imbricatus was described associated with both spruce and pine, although the latter forms were smaller and noted to be more palatable by mushroom hunters in Norway. Molecular analysis of the DNA revealed the two forms to be distinct genetically, and thus populations of what had been described as S. imbricatus were now assigned to Sarcodon squamosus, which includes collections in the British Isles and the Netherlands.The mushroom often grows in large fairy rings near pine heaths and in rocky flat soil. The cap is 10 to 25 centimetres (4 to 10 in) wide, shallowly funnel-shaped. The color is white, turning brownish-purple with age. The pileipellis has dark scales that are placed in concentric circles. They belong to growing areas with old trees where both the forest type and the growth type have a long continuity and they do not withstand complete felling.

== Edibility and uses ==
When young, the smell is pleasant and the taste is mild; older mushrooms may taste bitter. It can be cooked and mixed with other mushrooms, and stored in oil or cider vinegar.

From the point of view of mushroom dyeing, it is significant as one of the only mushroom species that can dye with shades of blue. Brown shades are obtained from young mushrooms, while older, almost mature ones give rarer shades of blue, turquoise and green.
