= Alma Holland Beers =

U.S. botanist (1892–1974)

Alma Holland Beers (January 10, 1892– October 31, 1974) was an American botanist known for being the first woman botanist at the University of North Carolina at Chapel Hill, including her work plant collecting, co-authoring multiple publications, and creating botanical illustrations. She worked closely with Dr. Williams Chamber Coker and Nancy Eliason, co-collecting and co-authoring with them. Beers became known as the backbone of the UNC Department of Botany, having been personally recruited by Coker after impressing him with her careful laboratory work in 1917. The standard author abbreviation Beers is used to indicate this person as the author when citing a botanical name.Alma Holland Beers was born in Moore Country, North Carolina on January 10, 1892.

Anna Holland Beers' career lasted for thirty-three years and her primary duty was serving as Executive Director of the Journal of the Elisha Mitchell Scientific Society from 1946 to 1951. She was also well advanced in Latin and French and worked on literature translations for the faculty. Research on UNC mycology records Alma Holland Beers as co-author of The Boletaceae of North Carolina (1943) and The Stipitate Hydnums of the Eastern United States (1951), indicating substantive contributions to Coker’s laboratory output. She also included detailed line drawings and scientific illustrations for both volumes, which reviewers praised for their excellence in detail.
