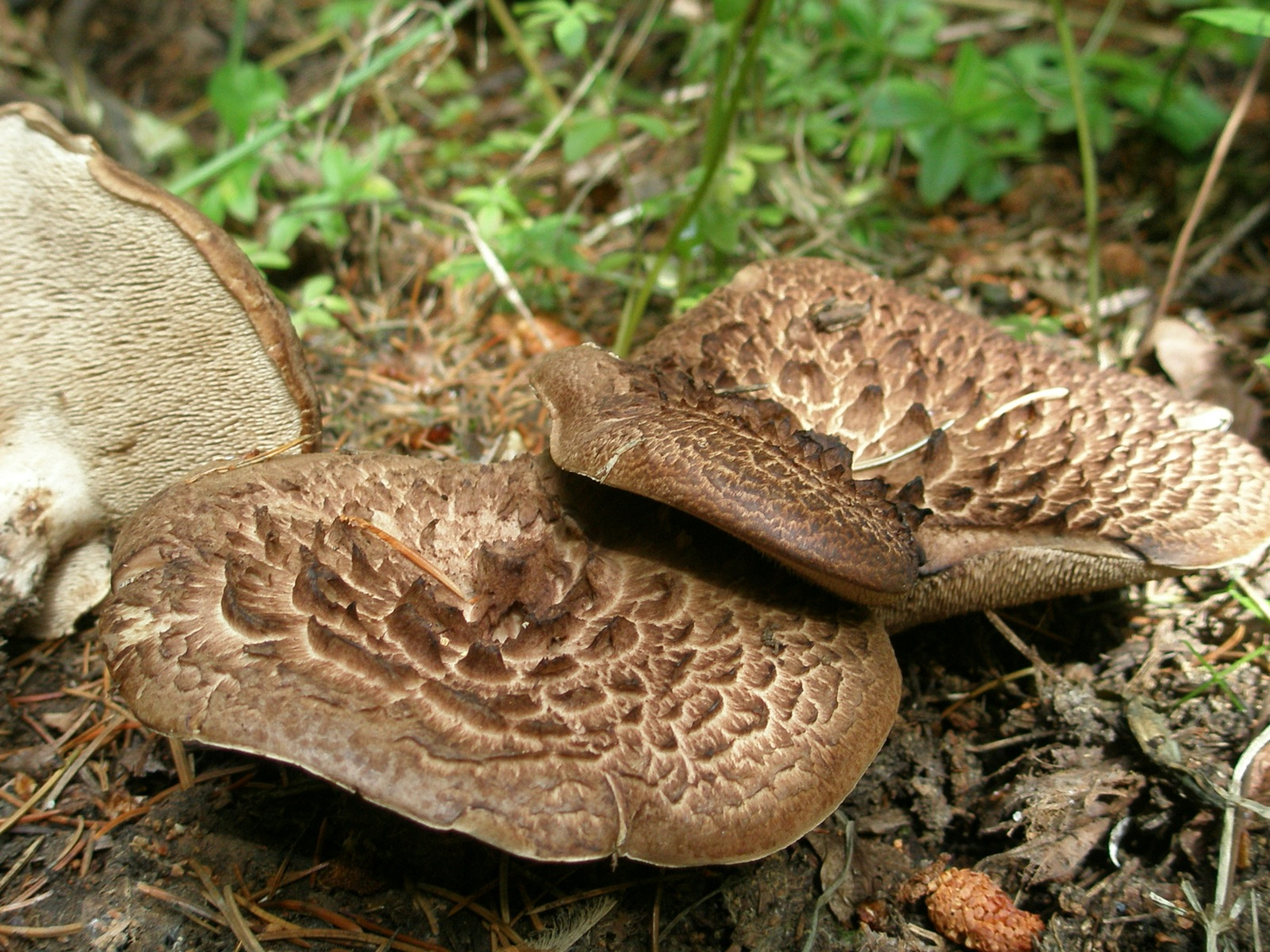
- Sarcodon imbricatus

Scientific classification
- Kingdom: Fungi
- Division: Basidiomycota
- Class: Agaricomycetes
- Order: Thelephorales
- Family: Bankeraceae
- Genus: Sarcodon; Quél. ex P.Karst. (1881)

Type species
- Sarcodon imbricatus (L.) P.Karst. (1881)

Species
- See text

= Sarcodon =

Genus of fungi

Sarcodon is a genus of fungi in the family Bankeraceae, which is part of the order Thelephorales, known for its almost universal ectomycorrhizal ecology. The genus owes its name to the presence of teeth-like spines on the hymenophore, from ancient Greek; sarco = flesh and odon = tooth. For this reason they are commonly called "tooth fungi", or "Hydnoid fungi".

== Description ==
Sarcodon species have yellow to brown tinted basidiospores, with lengths in the range of 7.4–9 μm. The basidiomata are often soft and fleshy.

== Species ==
In 2019, Larsson et al. transferred 12 species into the genus Hydnellum. In 2024, Douch et al. transferred Sarcodon carbonarius to the genus Neosarcodon. As of February 2026, Index Fungorum listed 42 valid species of Sarcodon.

- Sarcodon aglaosoma
- Sarcodon atroviridis
- Sarcodon austrofibulatus
- Sarcodon bubalinus
- Sarcodon caliginosus
- Sarcodon calvatus
- Sarcodon catalaunicus
- Sarcodon conchyliatus
- Sarcodon cyanellus
- Sarcodon cyrneus
- Sarcodon dissimulans
- Sarcodon excentricus
- Sarcodon flavidus
- Sarcodon giganteus
- Sarcodon harrisonii
- Sarcodon humilis
- Sarcodon ianthinus
- Sarcodon imbricatus
- Sarcodon lanuginosus
- Sarcodon leucopus
- Sarcodon lobatus
- Sarcodon nauseofoetidus
- Sarcodon neosquamosus
- Sarcodon nigrosquamosus
- Sarcodon praestans
- Sarcodon procerus
- Sarcodon pseudoimbricatus
- Sarcodon quercinofibulatus
- Sarcodon quietus
- Sarcodon regalis
- Sarcodon rimosus
- Sarcodon roseolus
- Sarcodon rutilus
- Sarcodon scabripes
- Sarcodon squamosus
- Sarcodon stereosarcinon
- Sarcodon subfelleus
- Sarcodon thwaitesii
- Sarcodon ussuriensis
- Sarcodon ustalis
- Sarcodon wrightii
- Sarcodon yunnanensis

== Human uses ==
Several species within the Sarcodon genus, including S. imbricatus (see figure), are edible. The fungus can be bitter, but that is less apparent in younger specimens. In China, it is a popular edible mushroom and it is used to reduce cholesterol, relax the muscles, and improve blood circulation. Isolates from the genus, called scabronines, may increase nerve growth factor synthesis in vitro.
