= Rudolf Arnold Maas Geesteranus =

Dutch mycologist (1911–2003)

Rudolf Arnold Maas Geesteranus (20 January 1911 in The Hague – 18 May 2003 in Oegstgeest), was a Dutch mycologist whose work on both ascomycetes and basidiomycetes helped to refine fungal taxonomy over a career of nearly six decades.

== Early life and education ==
Maas Geesteranus was born in The Hague, but spent his childhood (from infancy until age 18) in the Dutch East Indies, where his family emigrated shortly after his birth. Upon returning to the Netherlands in 1929, he completed secondary school in The Hague and enrolled at Leiden University to study biology. While still a student, he joined the staff of the Rijksherbarium (the National Herbarium of the Netherlands) as a volunteer assistant—a post that proved pivotal in launching his scientific career. In mid‑1939, at 28, he was promoted to assistant, becoming the sole mycologist on the herbarium staff at that time.

== Life and career ==
During the German occupation of the Netherlands in World War II, Maas Geesteranus continued his work under difficult circumstances. In 1942 he was appointed curator of the mycological herbarium of the Netherlands Mycological Society. Following liberation in 1945, he received the title of Curator of the mycological and lichenological collections at the Rijksherbarium in Leiden in 1946. His studies of northern European lichens formed the basis of his doctoral dissertation, and he was awarded a PhD in 1947.

Shortly after completing his doctorate, he undertook a one‑man botanical and lichenological expedition to Kenya, where he collected extensively among both lichens and vascular plants. By 1950, his research interests had shifted decisively from lichens to fungi proper. For the next several years he remained the only full‑time member of the mycology department at Leiden, even after the arrival of Marinus Anton Donk in 1956.

In his later career, Maas Geesteranus became particularly renowned for his work on the genus Mycena. He produced the two‑volume Mycenas of the Northern Hemisphere (1992), synthesising decades of his own research, and in 1997 published, in collaboration with André de Meijer, a monograph on the Mycena species of Paraná, Brazil. Although he officially retired from the Rijksherbarium in 1976, he remained scientifically active into the 1980s, continuing to describe new species and refine fungal classifications.

== Legacy ==
Over the course of his long career, Maas Geesteranus described numerous new taxa across multiple fungal groups and served as a mentor to both professional and amateur mycologists. His systematic treatments, particularly of Mycena, provided a firm basis for subsequent taxonomic and ecological studies. Beyond mycology, he maintained interests in mineralogy, butterfly collecting and painting. He died peacefully in Oegstgeest at the age of 92.

The standard author abbreviation Maas Geest. is used to indicate this person as the author when citing a botanical name.

== Eponyms of Rudolf Arnold Maas Geesteranus ==
=== Eponymous genera ===
- Geesterania Westph., Tomšovský & Rajchenb.

=== Eponymous species ===
- Agaricus geesterani Bas & Heinem.
- Coprinus geesterani Uljé
- Geoglossum geesterani Arauzo & Lebre
- Lyophyllum maas-geesterani Clémençon & Winterh.
- Mycena geesterani Heykoop, Esteve-Rav. & G.Moreno
- Parmelia geesterani Hale
- Pleurotus geesterani Singer

== See also ==
- Category:Taxa named by Rudolf Arnold Maas Geesteranus
