= Hydnoid fungi =

Group of fungi

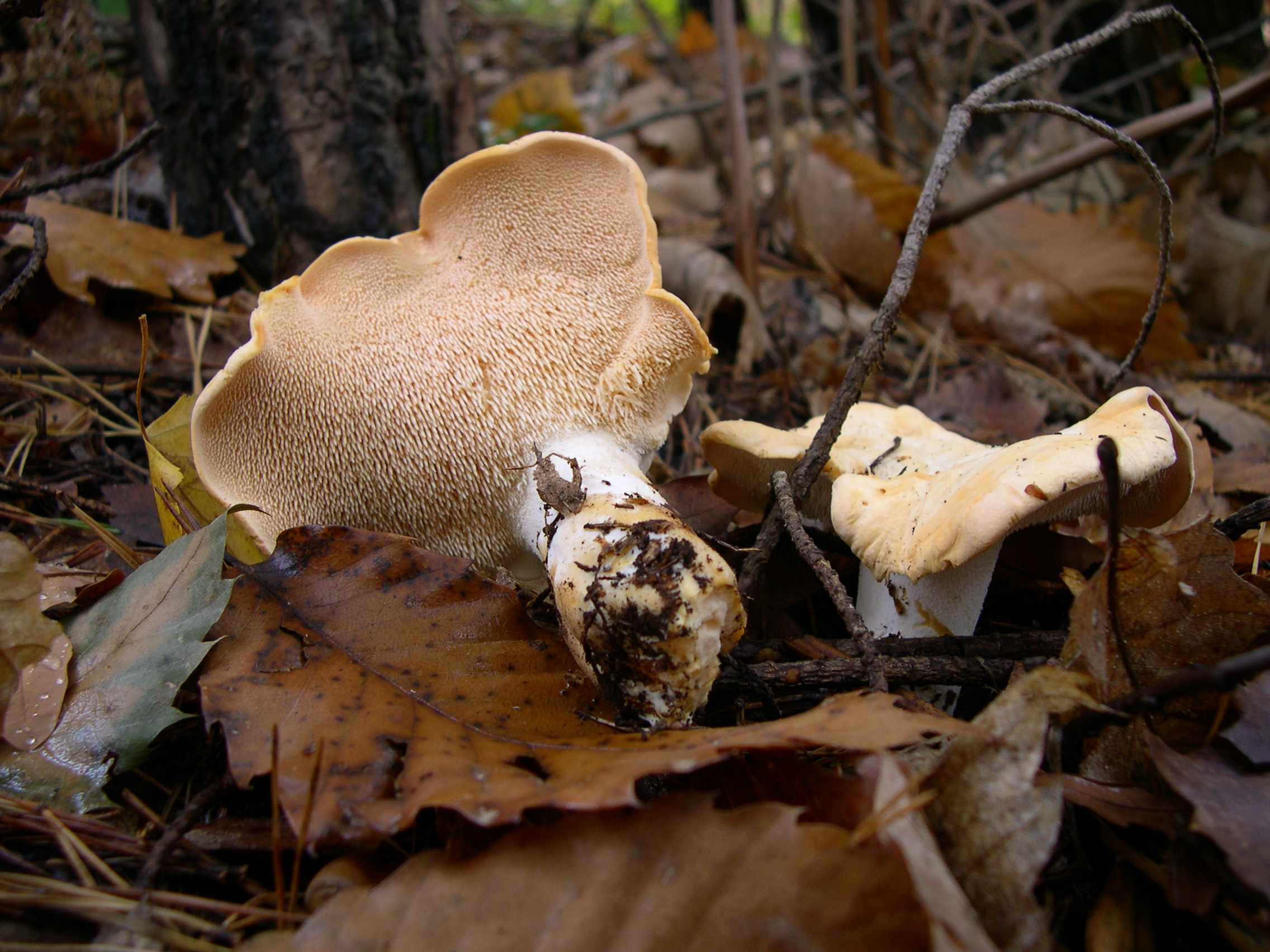
The hedgehog fungus, Hydnum repandum

The hydnoid fungi are a group of fungi in the Basidiomycota with basidiocarps (fruit bodies) producing spores on pendant, tooth-like or spine-like projections. They are colloquially called tooth fungi. Originally such fungi were referred to the genus Hydnum ("hydnoid" means Hydnum-like), but it is now known that not all hydnoid species are closely related.

== History ==
Hydnum was one of the original genera created by Linnaeus in his Species Plantarum of 1753. It contained all species of fungi with fruit bodies bearing pendant, tooth-like projections. Subsequent authors described around 900 species in the genus. With increasing use of the microscope, it became clear that not all tooth fungi were closely related and most Hydnum species were gradually moved to other genera. The Dutch mycologist Rudolph Arnold Maas Geesteranus paid particular attention to the group, producing a series of papers reviewing the taxonomy of hydnoid fungi.

The original genus Hydnum is still current, but is now restricted to the type species, Hydnum repandum, and its relatives in the order Cantharellales. Other species originally described in Hydnum have been reassigned to various genera in various orders including the Agaricales, Auriculariales, Gomphales, Hymenochaetales, Polyporales, Russulales, Thelephorales and Trechisporales.

== Description and genera ==
The fruit bodies of hydnoid fungi are diverse, but all produce their spores on the surface of pendant, tooth-like or spine-like projections.

=== Stipitate hydnoid fungi ===
Some terrestrial species producing fruit bodies with a pileus (cap) and stipe (stem) are collectively known as the stipitate hydnoid fungi and are often studied as a group because of their ecological similarity. The species concerned are now referred to the genera Bankera, Hydnellum, Phellodon, and Sarcodon. All are ectomycorrhizal, belong in the Thelephorales, and are considered to be indicator species of old, species-rich forests. In Europe, at least, many are of conservation concern and feature on national or regional red lists of threatened fungal species. In the United Kingdom the stipitate hydnoid fungi have been given Biodiversity Action Plan status which has increased interest in the group and has generated funding to be put into survey work and other research.

Species of Hydnum and the related Sistotrema confluens (Cantharellales) are also mycorrhizal, but have different ecological requirements. Other stipitate hydnoid fungi are wood decomposing, such as some species of Beenakia (Gomphales), Climacodon (Polyporales) and Mycorrhaphium (Polyporales).

=== Resupinate hydnoid fungi ===
The largest group of fungi formerly placed in the genus Hydnum are wood-rotting species, forming patch-like fruit bodies on dead attached branches, logs, stumps, and fallen wood. Species with small "teeth" (just a millimetre or so long) are sometimes described as "odontioid" (tooth-like). Species that form resupinate (effused) fruiting bodies are also considered part of the corticioid fungi. Genera that have hydnoid or odontioid representatives include Hydnochaete, Hyphodontia and Odonticium (Hymenochaetales), Dentipellis (Russulales), Dentocorticium, Mycoacia, Radulodon, Steccherinum (Polyporales) and Sarcodontia.

=== Additional hydnoid fungi ===
Other hydnoid fungi include a group of conspicuous, wood-rotting species with long spines belonging to the genus Hericium (Russulales), often referred to as "tooth fungi". The ear-pick fungus and other species of Auriscalpium (Russulales) are hydnoid, as is the odd jelly fungus Pseudohydnum gelatinosum (Auriculariales).

The distinction between polypores and hydnoid fungi is not always clear—irregular, split pores can also be interpreted as teeth. Consequently, some species are considered hydnoid or poroid depending on the context (e.g. Irpex lacteus).

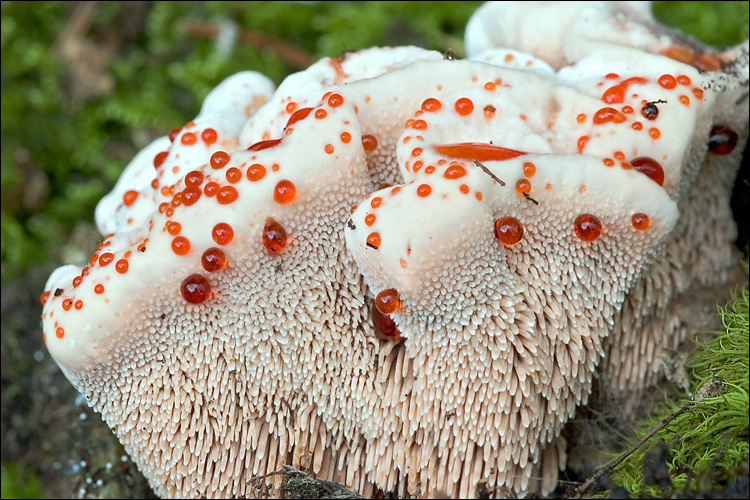
The Mealy Tooth, Hydnellum ferrugineum

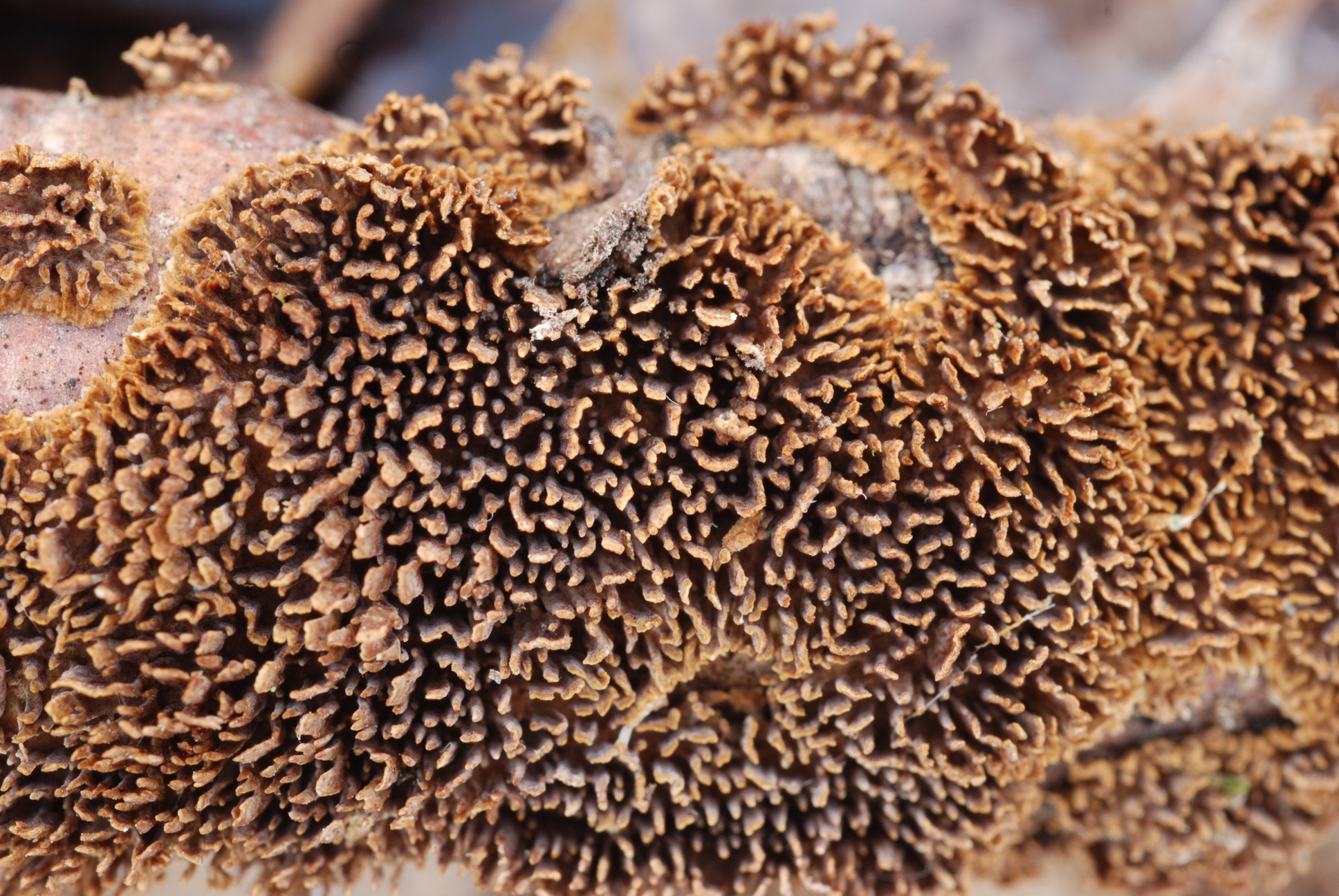
Dentate hymenophore of Hydnochaete olivacea

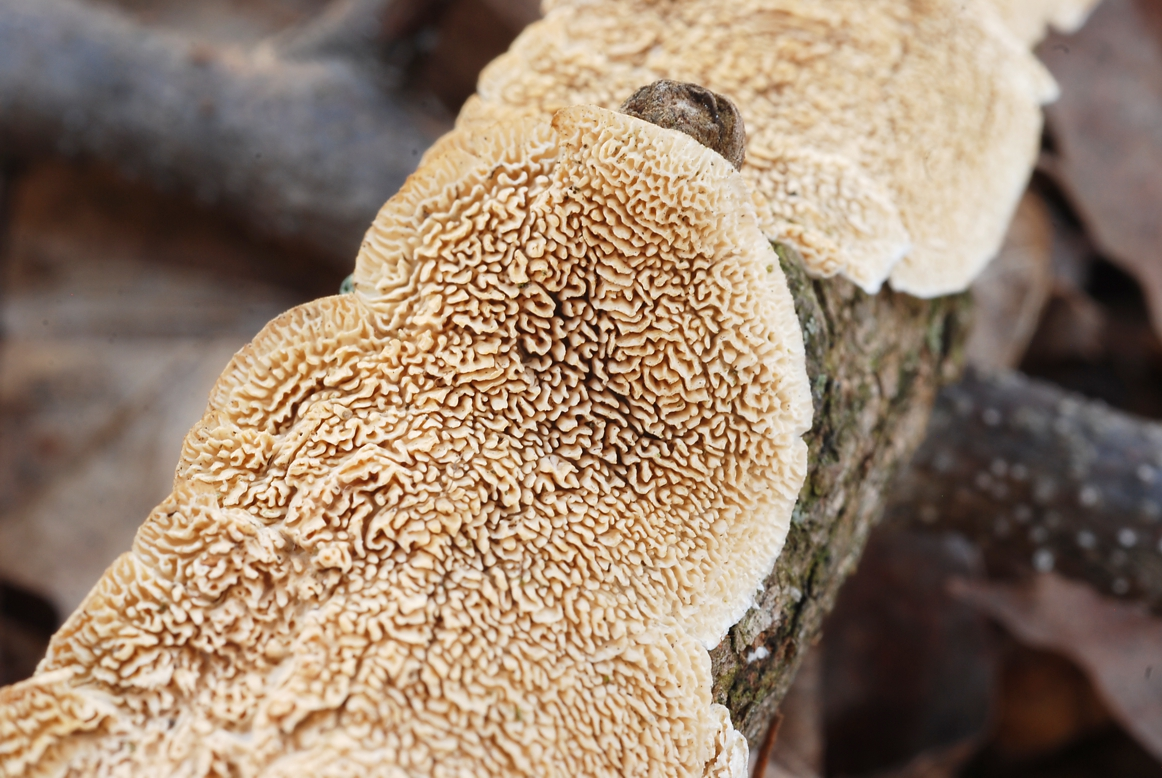
Hydnoid-poroid hymenophore of Irpex lacteus

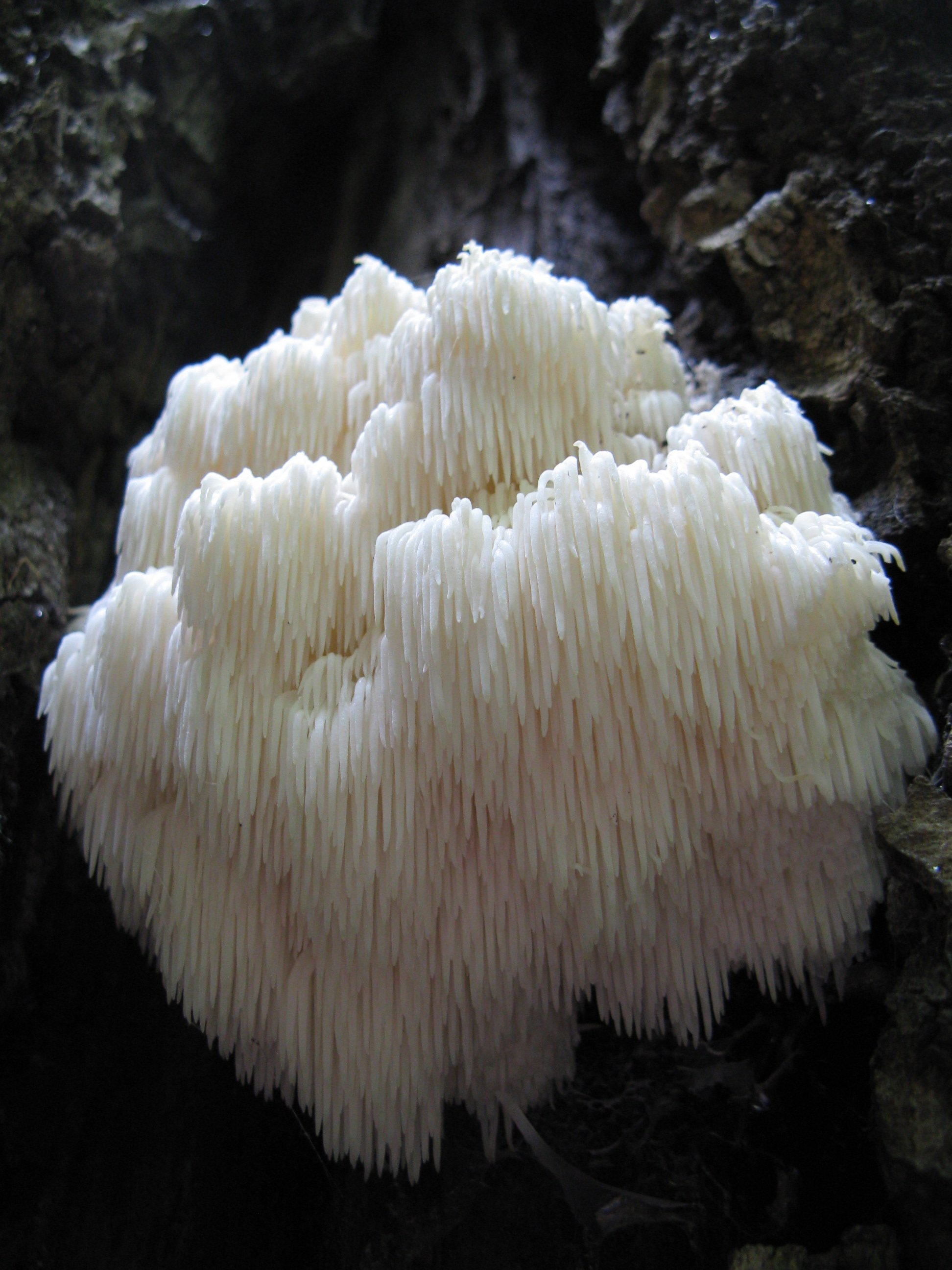
The Bear's Head Tooth Fungus, Hericium americanum
