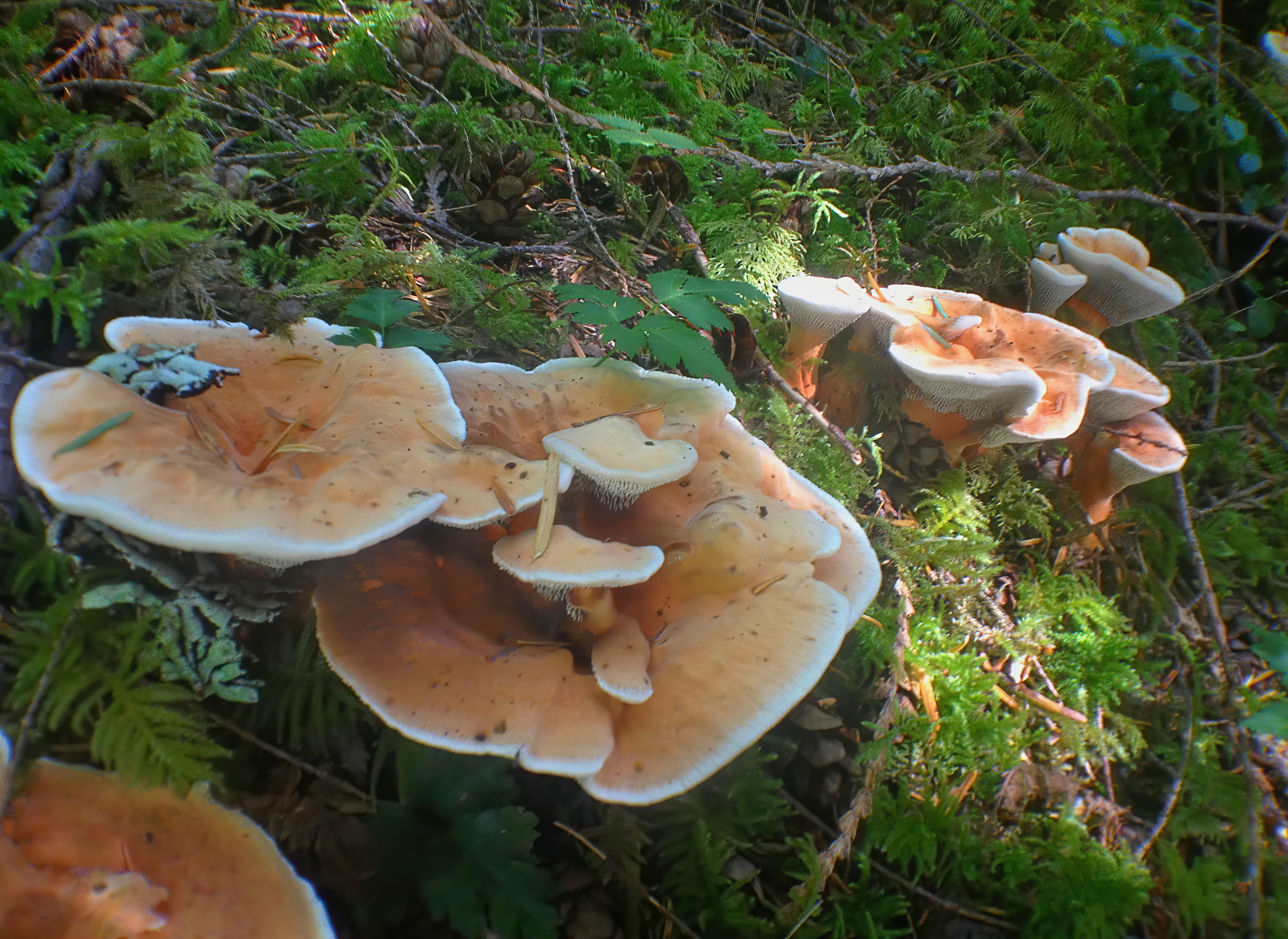
- Hydnellum aurantiacum, a member of the family Bankeraceae

Scientific classification
- Kingdom: Fungi
- Division: Basidiomycota
- Class: Agaricomycetes
- Order: Thelephorales
- Family: Bankeraceae; Donk (1961)

Type genus
- Bankera Coker & Beers ex Pouzar (1955)

Genera
- See text

= Bankeraceae =

Family of fungi

The Bankeraceae are a family of fungi in the order Thelephorales. Taxa are terrestrial, and ectomycorrhizal with plant species in families such as Pinaceae or Fagaceae. The family was circumscribed by Marinus Anton Donk in 1961. According to a 2008 estimate, the family contains 6 genera and 98 species.

== Genera ==
The family consists of the following genera:

- Bankera
- Boletopsis
- Corneroporus
- Hydnellum
- Neosarcodon
- Phellodon
- Sarcodon
