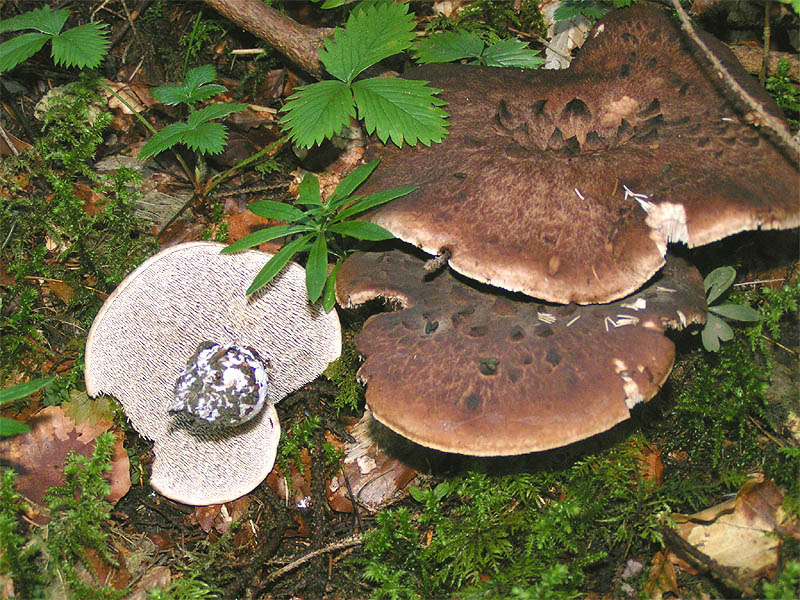
- Sarcodon imbricatus

Scientific classification
- Kingdom: Fungi
- Division: Basidiomycota
- Class: Agaricomycetes
- Subclass: incertae sedis
- Order: Thelephorales; Corner ex Oberw. (1976)

Families
- Bankeraceae Donk; Thelephoraceae Chevall.

= Thelephorales =

Order of fungi

The Thelephorales are an order of fungi in the class Agaricomycetes. The order includes corticioid and hydnoid fungi, together with a few polypores and clavarioid species. Most fungi within the Thelephorales are ectomycorrhizal. None is of any great economic importance, though Sarcodon imbricatus is edible and commercially marketed, whilst several species have been used for craft dyeing.

== Taxonomy ==
=== History ===
Though "the Thelephorales" were referred to in passing by E.J.H. Corner in 1968, the order was not formally published till 1976 when German mycologist Franz Oberwinkler first described it as encompassing the families Thelephoraceae and Bankeraceae. As originally conceived, species within the order had diverse basidiocarp (fruit body) forms, but shared several features in common, notably similarities in basidiospore shape (most having spiny to warted, often lobed spores) and similarities in basidiocarp colours, linked to the presence of thelephoric acid derivatives and often accompanied by blue to greenish reactions with alkalis.

=== Current status ===
Molecular research, based on cladistic analysis of DNA sequences, has supported the morphological concept of the Thelephorales, indicating that the order forms a distinct grouping within the Agaricomycetes, close to the Polyporales.

== Distribution and habitat ==
All fungi within the order are ectomycorrhizal, forming mutually beneficial associations with the roots of living trees. Distribution of the Thelephorales is cosmopolitan. According to a 2008 estimate, the order contains 18 genera and over 250 species worldwide.

== Economic importance ==
Sarcodon imbricatus is an edible species collected for local markets in some countries and commercially collected in China for export as a dried product. Polyozellus multiplex is also edible and collected for sale in North America. Several species within the Thelephorales have been used for dyeing wool by modern craft-dyers, including Hydnellum caeruleum in North America, Sarcodon squamosus in Scandinavia, and Thelephora palmata in Scotland.

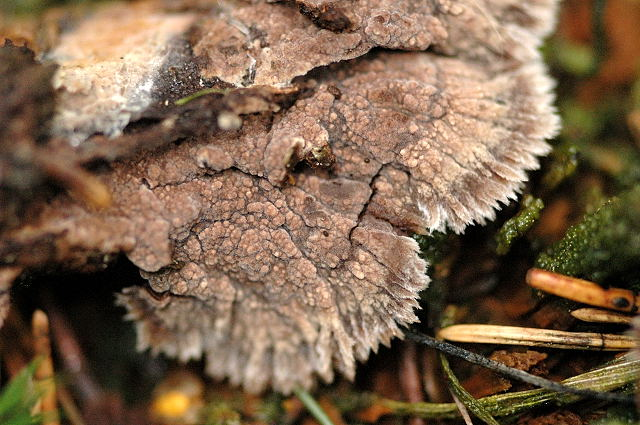
Thelephora terrestris (Thelephoraceae)

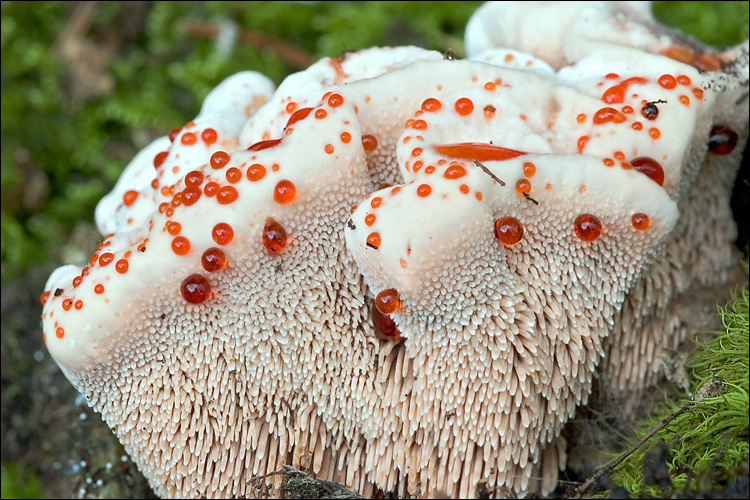
Hydnellum ferrugineum (Bankeraceae)

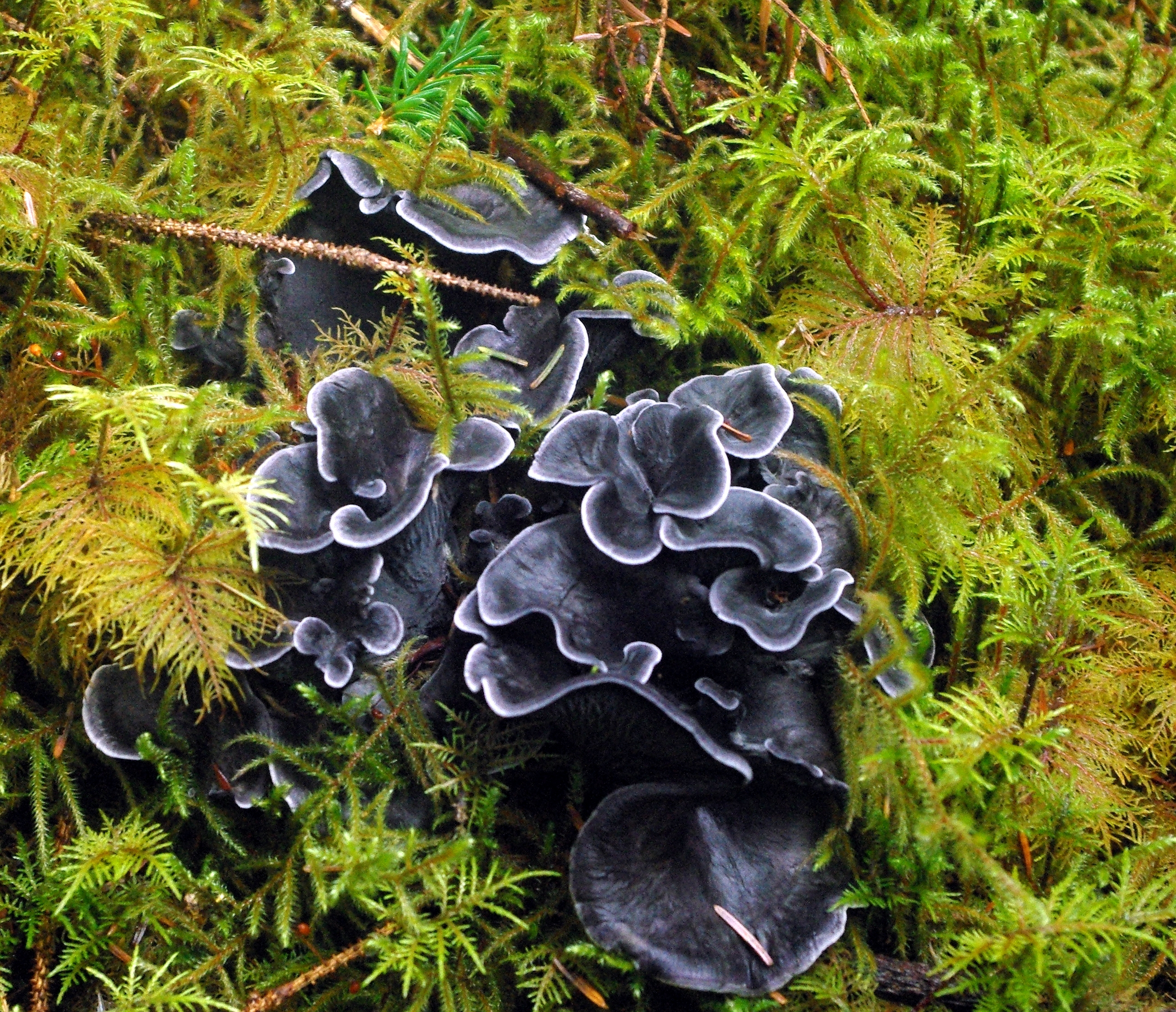
Polyozellus multiplex (Thelephoraceae)
