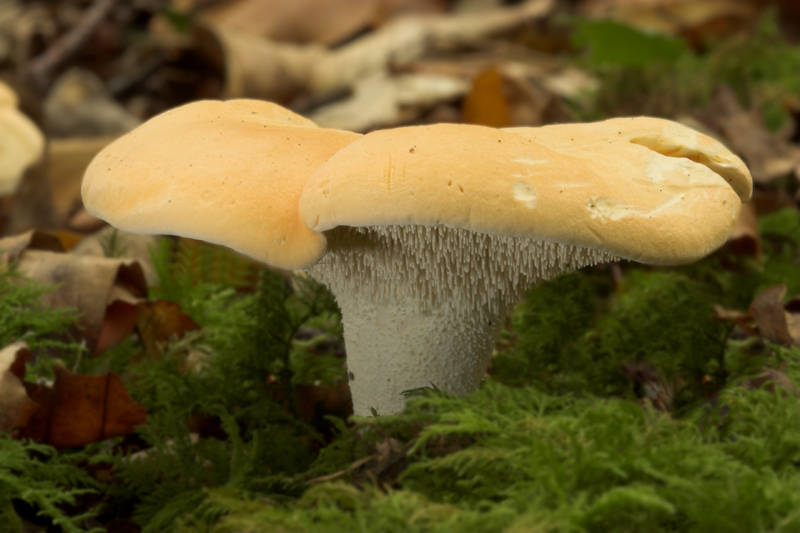

Scientific classification
- Kingdom: Fungi
- Division: Basidiomycota
- Class: Agaricomycetes
- Order: Cantharellales
- Family: Hydnaceae
- Genus: Hydnum
- Species: H. repandum

Binomial name
- Hydnum repandum L. (1753)

Synonyms
- Hydnum flavidum Schaeff. (1774); Hypothele repanda (L.) Paulet (1812); Dentinum repandum (L.) Gray (1821); Tyrodon repandus (L.) P.Karst. (1881); Sarcodon repandus (L.) Quél. (1886)

= Hydnum repandum =

Species of edible fungus of the family Hydnaceae distributed in Europe

Hydnum repandum
- Mycological characteristics
- Teeth on hymenium
- Cap is depressed
- Hymenium is decurrent
- Stipe is bare
- Spore print is white to cream
- Ecology is mycorrhizal
- Edibility is choice

Hydnum repandum, commonly known as the sweet tooth, pig's trotter, wood hedgehog or hedgehog mushroom, is a basidiomycete fungus of the family Hydnaceae. First described by Carl Linnaeus in 1753, it is the type species of the genus Hydnum.

The fungus produces fruit bodies (mushrooms) that are characterized by their spore-bearing structures—in the form of spines rather than gills—which hang down from the underside of the cap. The cap is dry, colored yellow to light orange to brown, and often develops an irregular shape, especially when it has grown closely crowded with adjacent fruit bodies. The mushroom tissue is white with a pleasant odor and a spicy or bitter taste. All parts of the mushroom stain orange with age or when bruised.

A mycorrhizal fungus, H. repandum is broadly distributed in Europe, where it fruits singly or in close groups in coniferous or deciduous woodland. This is a choice edible species, although mature specimens can develop a bitter taste. It has no poisonous lookalikes.

== Taxonomy ==
First officially described by Carl Linnaeus in his 1753 Species Plantarum, Hydnum repandum was sanctioned by Swedish mycologist Elias Fries in 1821. The species has been shuffled among several genera: Hypothele by French naturalist Jean-Jacques Paulet in 1812; Dentinum by British botanist Samuel Frederick Gray in 1821; Tyrodon by Finnish mycologist Petter Karsten in 1881; Sarcodon by French naturalist Lucien Quélet in 1886. After a 1977 nomenclatural proposal by American mycologist Ronald H. Petersen was accepted, Hydnum repandum became the official type species of the genus Hydnum. Previously, supporting arguments for making H. repandum the type were made by Dutch taxonomist Marinus Anton Donk (1958) and Petersen (1973), while Czech mycologist Zdeněk Pouzar (1958) and Canadian mycologist Kenneth Harrison (1971) thought that H. imbricatum should be the type.

Several forms and varieties of H. repandum have been described. Forms albidum and rufescens, found in Russia, were published by T.L. Nikolajeva in 1961; the latter taxon is synonymous with H. rufescens. Form amarum, published from Slovenia by Zlata Stropnik, Bogdan Tratnik and Garbrijel Seljak in 1988, is illegitimate as per article 36.1 of the International Code of Nomenclature for algae, fungi, and plants, as it was not given a sufficiently comprehensive description. French botanist Jean-Baptiste Barla described H. repandum var. rufescens in 1859. English naturalist Carleton Rea described the white-fruit bodied version as a variety—H. repandum var. album—in 1922.

Molecular studies have shown that the current species concept for H. repandum needed revision as there was a poor overlap between morphological and molecular species concepts. A 2009 phylogenetic analysis of European specimens, based on internal transcribed spacer and 5.8S DNA sequences, indicated that H. repandum specimens form two distinct clades, whose only consistent morphological distinction is cap size. These genetic differences foreshadowed the presence of undescribed cryptic species, and that the taxon may currently be undergoing intensive speciation. A comprehensive genetic study published in 2016 of members of the genus worldwide found that there are at least four species in the broad concept of H. repandum: two species from southern China, one from Europe and eastern North America, and H. repandum itself from Europe and northern (and alpine southwestern) China and Japan. Although it is missing from Central America, genetic material has been recovered from Venezuela from the tree Pakaraimaea dipterocarpacea, suggesting it somehow migrated there and had changed hosts.

The specific epithet repandum means "bent back", referring to the wavy cap margin. The varietal epithet album means "white as an egg". Hydnum repandum has been given several vernacular names: "sweet tooth", "yellow tooth fungus", "wood urchin", "spreading hedgehog", "hedgehog mushroom", or "pig's trotter". The variety album is known as "white wood".

== Description ==
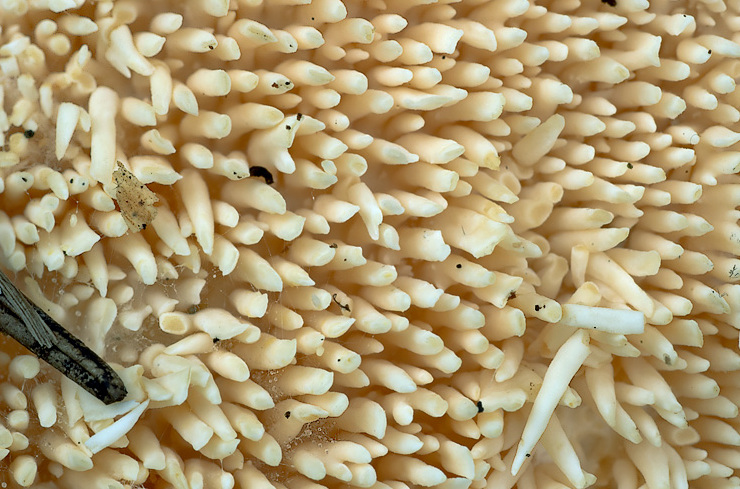
Detail of the spines

The orange-, yellow- or tan-colored pileus (cap) is up to 17 centimetres (6 1/2 in) wide, although specimens measuring 25 cm (10 in) have been documented. It is generally somewhat irregular in shape (possibly being convex or concave at maturity), with a wavy margin that is rolled inward when young. Caps grow in a distorted shape when fruit bodies are closely clustered. The cap surface is generally dry and smooth, although mature specimens may show cracking. Viewed from above, the caps of mature specimens resemble somewhat those of chanterelles. The flesh is thick, white, firm, brittle, and bruises yellow to orange-brown. The underside is densely covered with small, slender whitish spines measuring 2–7 mm (1/16–1/4 in) long. These spines sometimes run down at least one side of the stipe. The stipe, typically 3–10 cm (1–4 in) long and 1–3 cm (1/2–1 1/4 in) thick, is either white or the same color as the cap, and is sometimes off-center. It is easy to overlook the mushrooms when they are situated amongst gilled mushrooms and boletes, because the cap and stipe are fairly nondescript and the mushrooms must be turned over to reveal their spines. The pure white variety of this species, H. repandum var. album, is smaller than the main variety, with a cap measuring 2–7 cm (1–3 in) wide and a stipe that is 1–3 cm (1/2–1 1/4 in) long.

The spore print is pale cream. The basidiospores are smooth, thin-walled and hyaline (translucent), roughly spherical to broadly egg-shaped, and measure 5.5–7.5 by 4.5–5.5 μm. They usually contain a single, large refractive oil droplet. The basidia (spore-bearing cells) are club-shaped, four-spored, and measure 30–45 by 6–10 μm. The cap cuticle is a trichodermium (where the outermost hyphae emerge roughly parallel, like hairs, perpendicular to the cap surface) of narrow, club-shaped cells that are 2.5–4 μm wide. Underneath this tissue is the subhymenial layer of interwoven hyphae measuring 10–20 μm in diameter. The spine tissue is made of narrow (2–5 μm diameter), thin-walled hyphae with clamp connections.

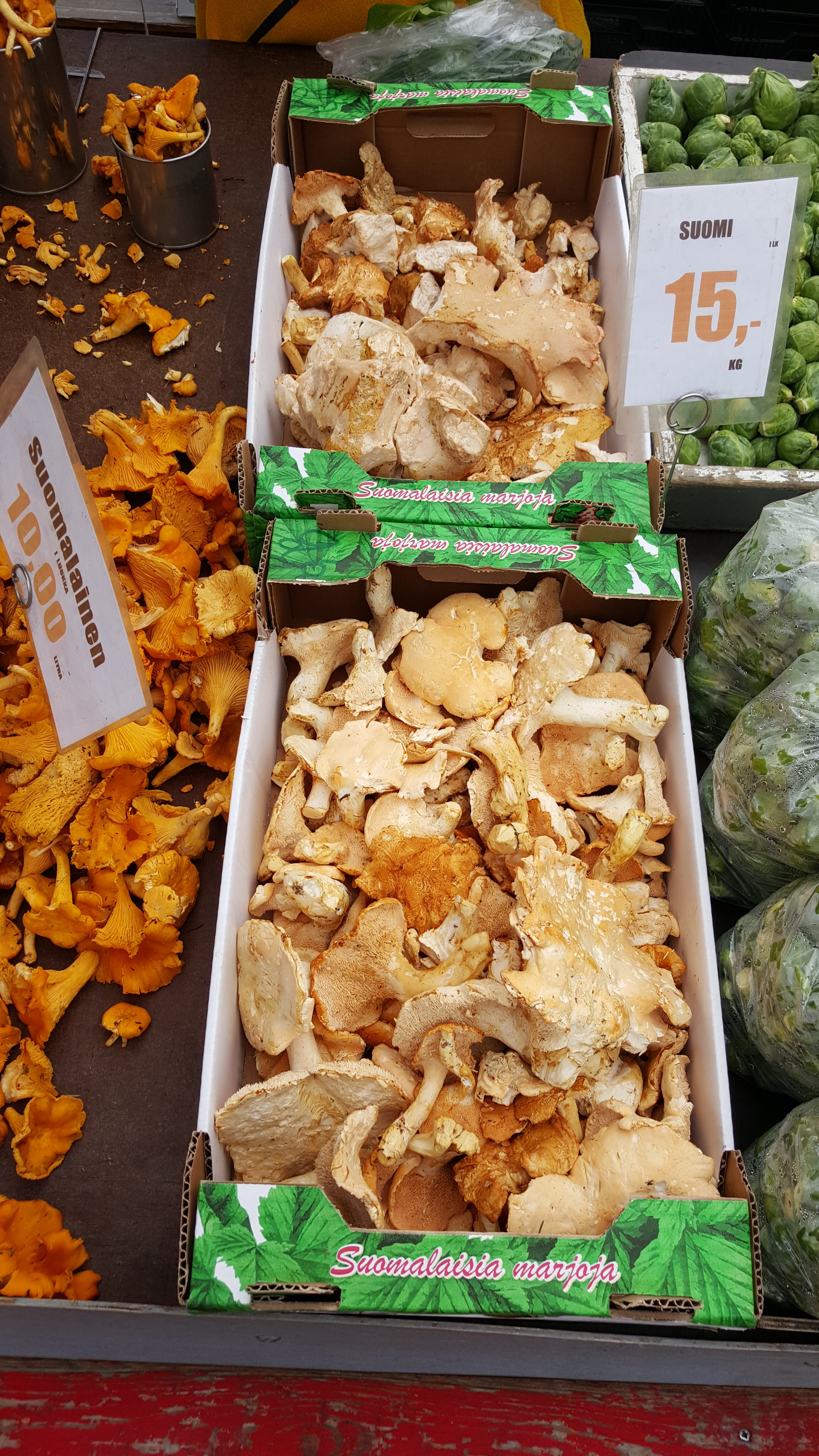
At a market in Finland

=== Chemistry ===
Both H. repandum and the variety album contain the diepoxide compound repandiol (2R,3R,8R,9R)-4,6-decadiyne-2,3:8,9-diepoxy-1,10-diol), which is under laboratory research to determine its possible effects. The volatile organic compounds responsible for the fruity aroma of the mushroom include eight-carbon derivatives, such as 1-octen-3-ol, (E)-2-octenol, and (E)-1,3-octadiene.

European studies conducted after the 1986 Chernobyl disaster showed that the fruit bodies have a high rate of accumulation of the radioactive isotope caesium.

=== Similar species ===
North American lookalikes include the white hedgehog (Hydnum albidum) and the giant hedgehog (H. albomagnum). H. albidum has a white to pale yellowish grey fruit body that bruises yellow to orange. H. albomagnum is large and paler than H. repandum. Hydnum umbilicatum is smaller, with caps measuring 3–5 cm (1–2 in) in diameter, and thinner stipes that are 0.5–1 cm (1/4–1/2 in) wide. Its caps are umbilicate (with a navel-like cavity), sometimes with a hole in the center of the cap, unlike the flattened or slightly depressed caps of H. repandum. Microscopically, H. umbilicatum has spores that are larger and more elliptical than those of H. repandum, measuring 7.5–9 by 6–7.5 μm.

A European lookalike, H. rufescens, is also smaller than H. repandum, and has a deeper apricot to orange color. Hydnum ellipsosporum, described as a new species from Germany in 2004, differs from H. repandum by the shape and length of its spores, which are ellipsoid and measure 9–11 by 6–7.5 μm. Compared to H. repandum, it has smaller fruit bodies, with cap diameters ranging from 3 to 5 cm (1 to 2 in) wide.

== Habitat and distribution ==
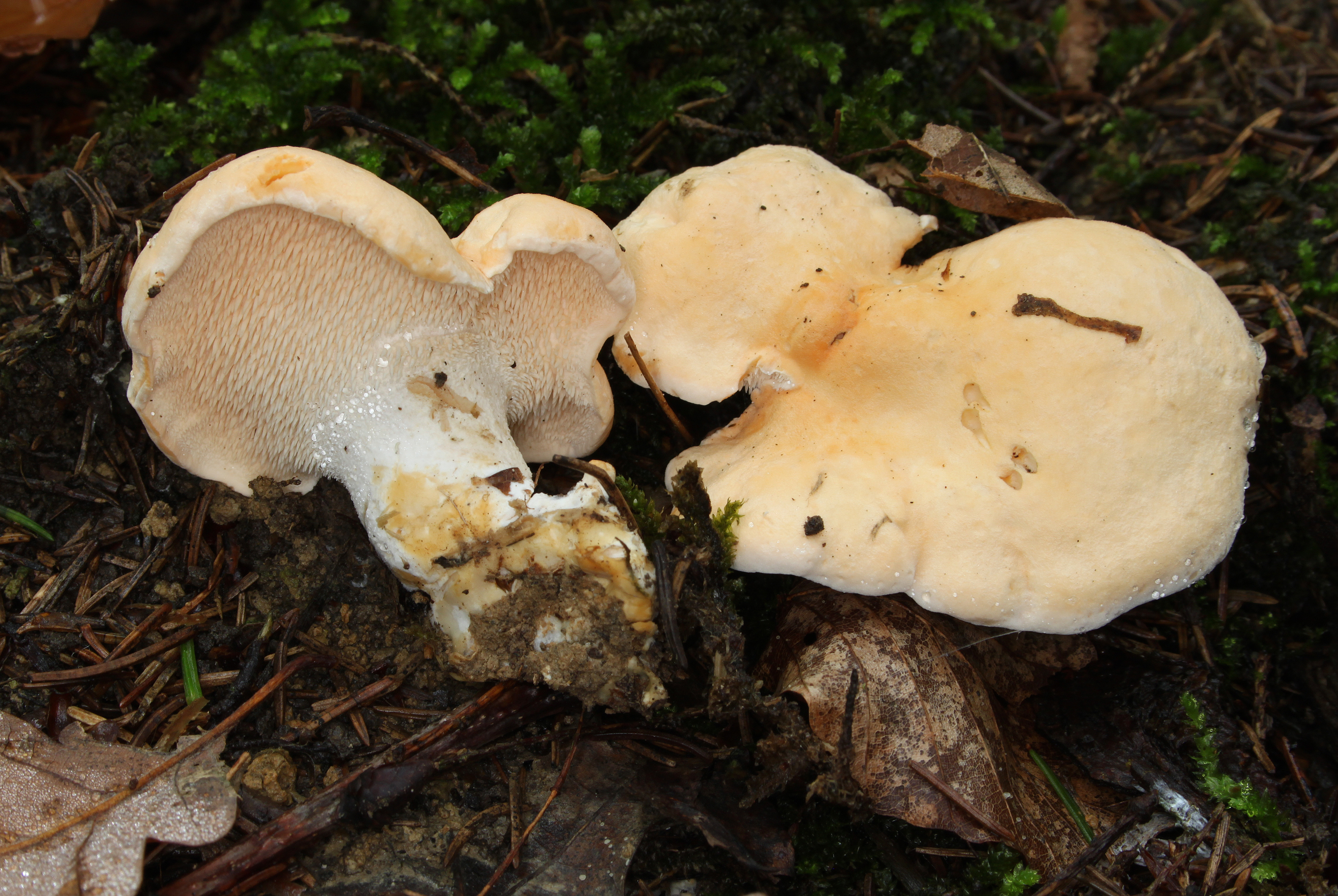
Collection from Eggingen, Germany

H. repandum is a mycorrhizal fungus. The fruit bodies grow singly, scattered, or in groups on the ground or in leaf litter in both coniferous and deciduous forests. They can also grow in fairy rings. Fruiting occurs from summer to autumn. It is one of the most common of the tooth fungi.

The species is widely distributed in Europe, where, it has been listed as a vulnerable species in the Red Data Lists of the Netherlands, Belgium, and Germany; Sweden lists it as being of Least Concern. The species is found in the Pacific Northwest and Rocky Mountains, and with oaks in eastern North America. It does not occur in Canada, but two related species do: H. washingtonianum and H. subolympicum.

== Uses ==
Hydnum repandum, dried
Nutritional value per 100 g (3.5 oz)
- Energy: 1,431 kJ (342 kcal)
- Carbohydrates: 56.1 g
- Fat: 4.3 g
- Protein: 19.7 g
Vitamins and minerals
Vitamins	Quantity %DV^{†}
Vitamin C	1% 1.1 mg
Minerals	Quantity %DV^{†}
Calcium	46% 600 mg
Copper	4322% 38.9 mg
Iron	211% 38 mg
Magnesium	55% 230 mg
Manganese	1009% 23.2 mg
Potassium	0% 2.89 mg
Sodium	1% 31.9 mg
Zinc	52% 5.72 mg
- ^{†}Percentages estimated using US recommendations for adults, except for potassium, which is estimated based on expert recommendation from the National Academies.

=== Nutrition ===
Dried H. repandum is 56% carbohydrates, 4% fat, and 20% protein. In a 100 gram reference amount, several dietary minerals are high in content, especially copper and manganese. Major fatty acids include palmitic acid (16%), stearic acid (1%), oleic acid (26%), linoleic acid (48%), and linolenic acid (20%). Mycosterol is present.

=== Culinary ===
H. repandum is considered to be a good edible mushroom, having a sweet, nutty taste and a crunchy texture. Some consider it to be the culinary equivalent of the chanterelle. Author Michael Kuo rates it as "great", noting that there are no poisonous lookalikes and that H. repandum mushrooms are unlikely to be infested with maggots.

Delicately brushing the cap and stipe of specimens immediately after harvest will help prevent soil from getting lodged between the teeth. H. repandum mushrooms can be cooked by pickling, simmering in milk or stock, and sautéeing, which creates a "tender, meaty texture and a mild flavor." The mushroom tissue absorbs liquids well and assumes the flavors of added ingredients. The firm texture of the cooked mushroom makes it suitable for freezing. Its natural flavor is reportedly similar to the peppery taste of watercress, or oysters. Older specimens may have a bitter taste, but boiling can remove the bitterness. Specimens found under conifers can taste "unpleasantly strong". The form amarum, locally common in Slovakia, is reportedly inedible because its fruit body has a bitter taste at all developmental stages.

Hydnum repandum is frequently sold with chanterelles in Italy, and in France, it is one of the officially recognized edible species sold in markets. In Europe, it is usually sold under its French name pied-de-mouton (sheep's foot). H. repandum mushrooms are also used as a food source by the red squirrel (Sciurus vulgaris).
