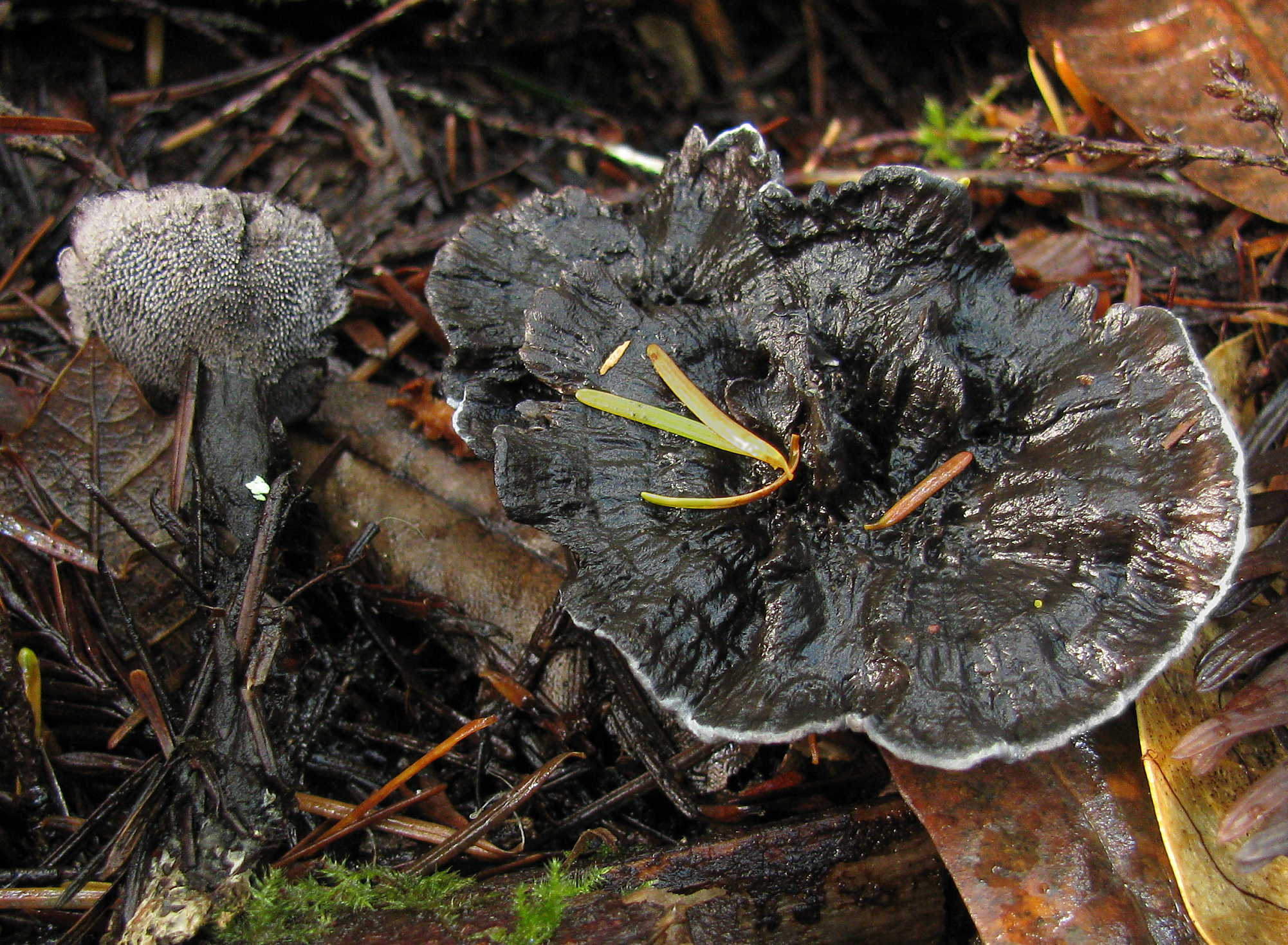

Scientific classification
- Domain: Eukaryota
- Kingdom: Fungi
- Division: Basidiomycota
- Class: Agaricomycetes
- Order: Thelephorales
- Family: Bankeraceae
- Genus: Phellodon
- Species: P. atratus

Binomial name
- Phellodon atratus K.A.Harrison (1964)

= Phellodon atratus =

Species of fungus

Phellodon atratus is a species of tooth fungus in the family Bankeraceae. Found in North America, it occurs most frequently closer to the Pacific coast and under Sitka spruce.

== Taxonomy ==
The species was described as new to science in 1964 by Canadian mycologist Kenneth A. Harrison.

== Description ==
The cap is dark violet to black, sometimes making it difficult to see; the margins are usually lighter. It is 1.5–5 centimetres (5/8–2 in) wide, while the off-center stipe is 1.5–4.5 cm (1/2–1 3/4 in) tall. The flesh is violet or blue-black. It has a mild smell and produces a white spore print.

Its edibility is unknown, but it is too small and tough to be of interest.

=== Similar species ===
Phellodon melaleucus is similar, but appears more brownish, also staining brown. Other lookalikes include P. niger, P. alboniger, P. melaleucus, P. tomentosus, and members of Hydnellum.

== Distribution and habitat ==
The species occurs most frequently closer to the Pacific coast and under Sitka spruce.
