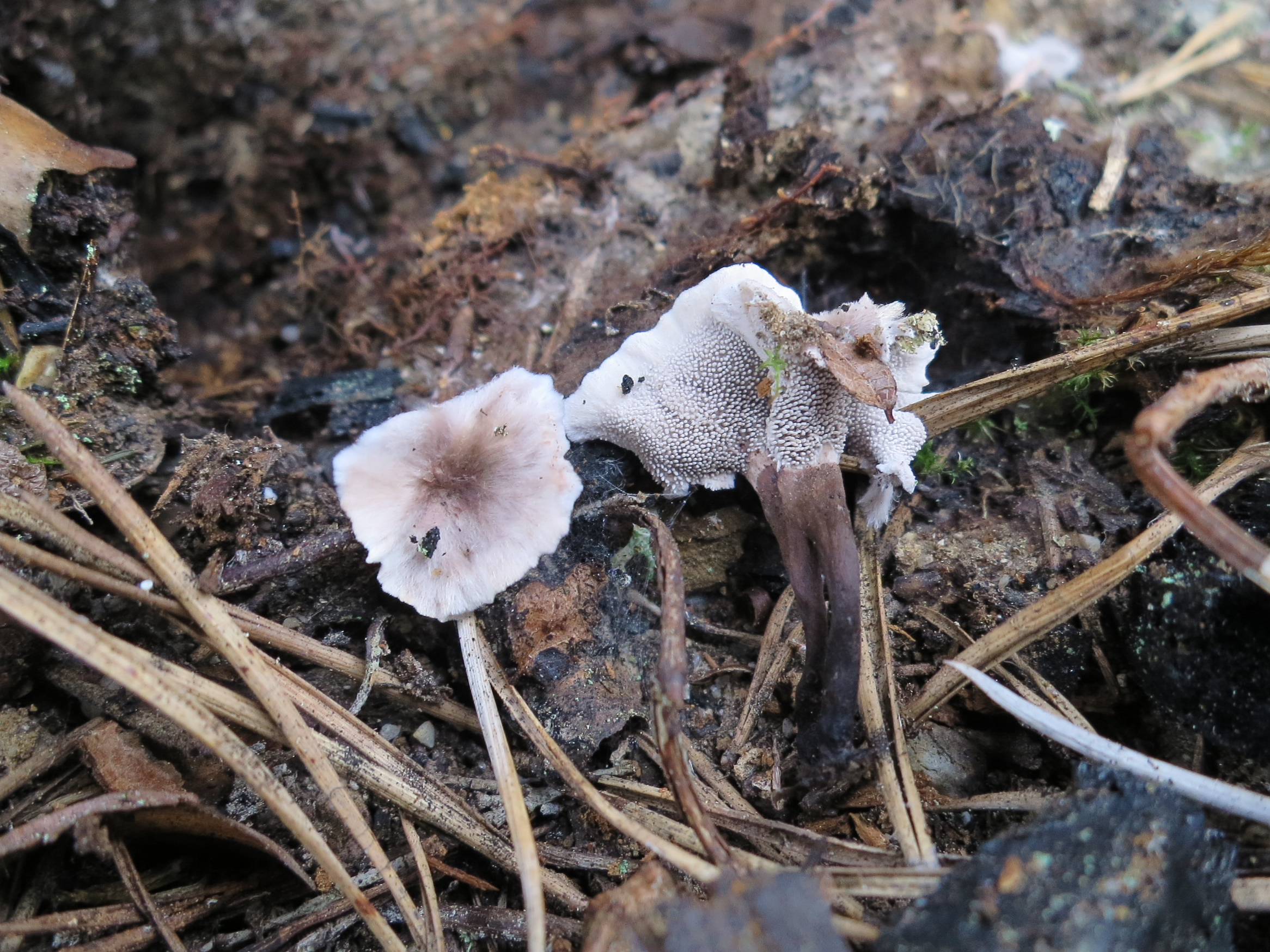

Conservation status
- Vulnerable (IUCN 3.1)

Scientific classification
- Kingdom: Fungi
- Division: Basidiomycota
- Class: Agaricomycetes
- Order: Thelephorales
- Family: Bankeraceae
- Genus: Phellodon
- Species: P. secretus

Binomial name
- Phellodon secretus Niemelä & Kinnunen (2003)

= Phellodon secretus =

Species of tooth fungus

Phellodon secretus is a rare species of tooth fungus in the family Bankeraceae, described in 2003. The fungus has a distinctive growth habit, typically emerging in sheltered spaces beneath fallen pine trunks or rootstocks with only a few centimetres of gap between the soil and decayed wood. Its small, slender fruit bodies feature thin, cottony soft caps that are initially white with an ash-grey tint, becoming darker with age, and bear slender white to greyish spines on their underside. Originally found in old-growth pine woodlands in Finland, the species has since been recorded in England and detected through environmental DNA in several other countries, suggesting a wider Holarctic distribution.

== Description ==
Phellodon secretus has a distinctive growth habit, typically emerging in sheltered spaces beneath fallen pine trunks or rootstocks, with only a few centimetres of gap between the soil and decayed wood. The basidiocarps (fruiting bodies) initially emerge from the humus as thin, needle-like black mycology about 1 mm in diameter. The cap (pileus) only begins to develop after the stipe makes contact with the overhanging wood surface above.

The mature fruiting body is small, slender and fragile. The pileus is plane or funnel-shaped, sometimes irregularly roundish and lobed, measuring 0.9–3 cm (occasionally up to 5.5 cm) in diameter. It is thin (0.3–1.5 mm, rarely up to 3.5 mm) and cottony soft throughout. Young specimens are white with an ash-grey tint, while older specimens become darker grey or develop a sepia hue. The pileus is evenly coloured in young specimens, becoming paler towards the margin in older ones, but lacks the zonation pattern seen in some related species.

The lower surface of the pileus bears slender, sharp hymenial spines that are initially white but later become light greyish-white. These spines are regular, dense, 0.3–0.9 mm long (occasionally up to 1.5 mm) and 0.06–0.12 mm in diameter at the base. The stipe is black, glabrous (smooth), very thin (0.3–1.8 mm, rarely up to 2.3 mm) and of even thickness, reaching 10–18 mm in length. It becomes brittle when dried. Fresh specimens are odourless, while dried specimens emit a very faint spicy scent. The flesh turns olivaceous (pale brownish green) when treated with potassium hydroxide (KOH) solution. Microscopically, P. secretus has a monomitic hyphal system with simple-septate hyphae (lacking clamp connections). The basidiospores are roughly spherical (globose), thin-walled, hyaline (colourless), and measure 2.9–3.3 by 2.7–3 μm. They bear small spines and have a distinct oblique apiculus.

Phellodon secretus closely resembles Phellodon connatus but differs in having a thinner stipe, cottony soft pileus, and smaller, more globose spores. In its ecology and distribution, it shows similarities to Hydnellum gracilipes.

The species appears to be mycorrhizal, forming symbiotic relationships with trees. It is extremely rare, found primarily in dry, old-growth pine woodlands in the Northern boreal and Middle boreal vegetation zones of Finland, particularly in areas with a fairly continental climate.

=== Similar species ===
Other members of the genus can be confused with Phellodon secretus. For example, P. tomentosus is typically larger, with a brown‑coloured pileus marked by concentric zones, whereas both P. niger and P. confluens bear a more conspicuous woolly (tomentose) covering on the stipe and produce basidiospores that are appreciably larger than those of P. secretus.

== Habitat and distribution ==
In its original description, P. secretus was noted as strictly associated with old‑growth Pinus sylvestris woodlands, growing in the narrow gap between humus and fallen pine trunks or kelo rootstocks. British records come from Castanea sativa–pine mixed stands at two Fagaceae‑associated hydnoid hotspots (Buttersteep and Rapley 2–4) in Swinley Forest, Berkshire. Fruiting bodies were found beneath chestnut plant litter on low mossy mounds, often close (≤ 10 m) to Scots pine; lifting overlying wood sometimes broke the stipe, leaving the pileus attached to the wood above.

Below‑ground, soil eDNA sampling detected P. secretus in three quadrats at each of the two sites, plus a further quadrat 750 m away on Mill pond embankment, indicating a wider mycelial presence than fruiting bodies alone reveal. Although no further records have yet appeared outside Finland and England, identical or near‑identical barcodes have since been reported from Estonia, Portugal and Russia, and a mycorrhizal root tip from California (Pinus muricata) indicates a Holarctic distribution.
