= Phellodon excentrimexicanus =

Scientific classification
- Domain: Eukaryota
- Kingdom: Fungi
- Division: Basidiomycota
- Class: Agaricomycetes
- Order: Thelephorales
- Family: Bankeraceae
- Genus: Phellodon
- Species: P. excentrimexicanus

Binomial name
- Phellodon excentrimexicanus R.E.Baird (1985)

Species of fungus

Phellodon excentrimexicanus is a species of tooth fungus in the family Bankeraceae. Found in Mexico, it was described as new to science in 1985 by mycologist Richard Baird (the original epithet spelling was "excentri-mexicana"). It is similar in appearance to Phellodon fibulatus, which is found in the southern Appalachian Mountains, but the Mexican species lacks clamp connections, and its stipe is consistently eccentric (i.e., attached to the side, rather than the center, of the cap).
