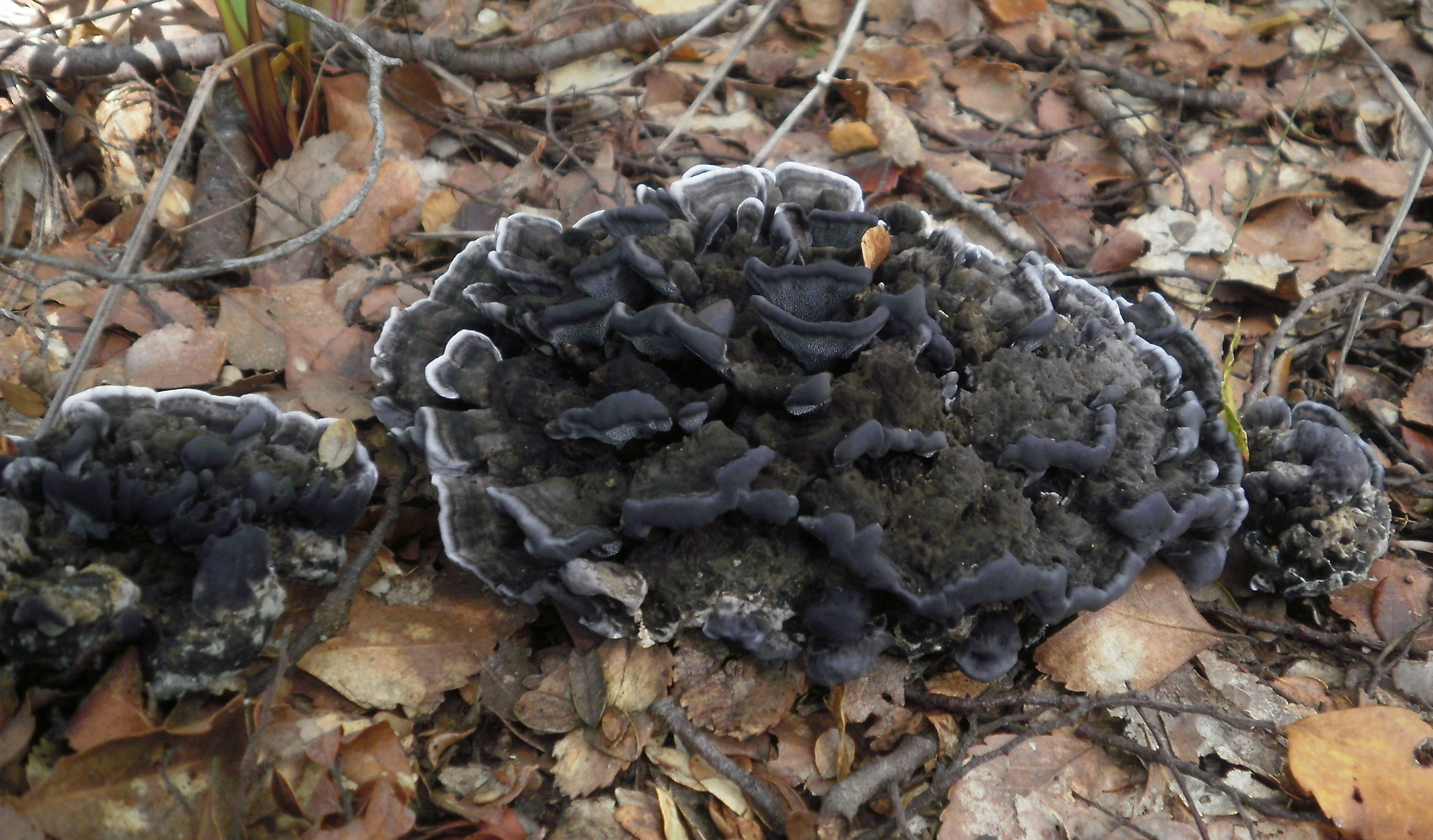

Scientific classification
- Domain: Eukaryota
- Kingdom: Fungi
- Division: Basidiomycota
- Class: Agaricomycetes
- Order: Thelephorales
- Family: Bankeraceae
- Genus: Phellodon
- Species: P. sinclairii

Binomial name
- Phellodon sinclairii (Berk.) G.Cunn. (1958)

Synonyms
- Hydnum sinclairii Berk. (1867)

= Phellodon sinclairii =

Species of fungus

Phellodon sinclairii is a native tooth fungus found in beech forests of New Zealand. It was first described by Miles Joseph Berkeley in 1867 as a species of Hydnum in Joseph Dalton Hooker's work Handbook of the New Zealand Flora. The type locality was on Maungatua. Gordon Herriot Cunningham transferred the species to the genus Phellodon in 1958.

The fruit bodies of P. sinclairii have caps up to 3 cm (1.2 in) in diameter when single, or up to 7 cm (2.8 in) when the caps are fused together in groups. The cap surface is black with a whitish margin. The crowded spines on the cap underside are up to 2 mm long, and run decurrently down the stipe. Initially whitish, they become gray in age. Dried specimens have the odour of fenugreek.
