= Phellodon plicatus =

Scientific classification
- Domain: Eukaryota
- Kingdom: Fungi
- Division: Basidiomycota
- Class: Agaricomycetes
- Order: Thelephorales
- Family: Bankeraceae
- Genus: Phellodon
- Species: P. plicatus

Binomial name
- Phellodon plicatus (Lloyd) Maas Geest. (1966)

Synonyms
- Hydnum plicatum Lloyd (1925)

Species of fungus

Phellodon plicatus is a species of tooth fungus in the family Bankeraceae. Found in Australia, it was first described in 1925 by Curtis Gates Lloyd as a species of Hydnum. Dutch mycologist Rudolph Arnold Maas Geesteranus transferred it to the genus Phellodon in 1966.
