= Phellodon maliensis =

Scientific classification
- Domain: Eukaryota
- Kingdom: Fungi
- Division: Basidiomycota
- Class: Agaricomycetes
- Order: Thelephorales
- Family: Bankeraceae
- Genus: Phellodon
- Species: P. maliensis

Binomial name
- Phellodon maliensis (Lloyd) Maas Geest. (1966)

Synonyms
- Hydnum maliensis Lloyd (1923)

Species of fungus

Phellodon maliensis is a species of tooth fungus in the family Bankeraceae. Found in Australia, it was originally described as a new species by Curtis Gates Lloyd in 1923. It was originally placed in Hydnum, until Dutch mycologist Rudolph Arnold Maas Geesteranus transferred it to the genus Phellodon in 1966.
