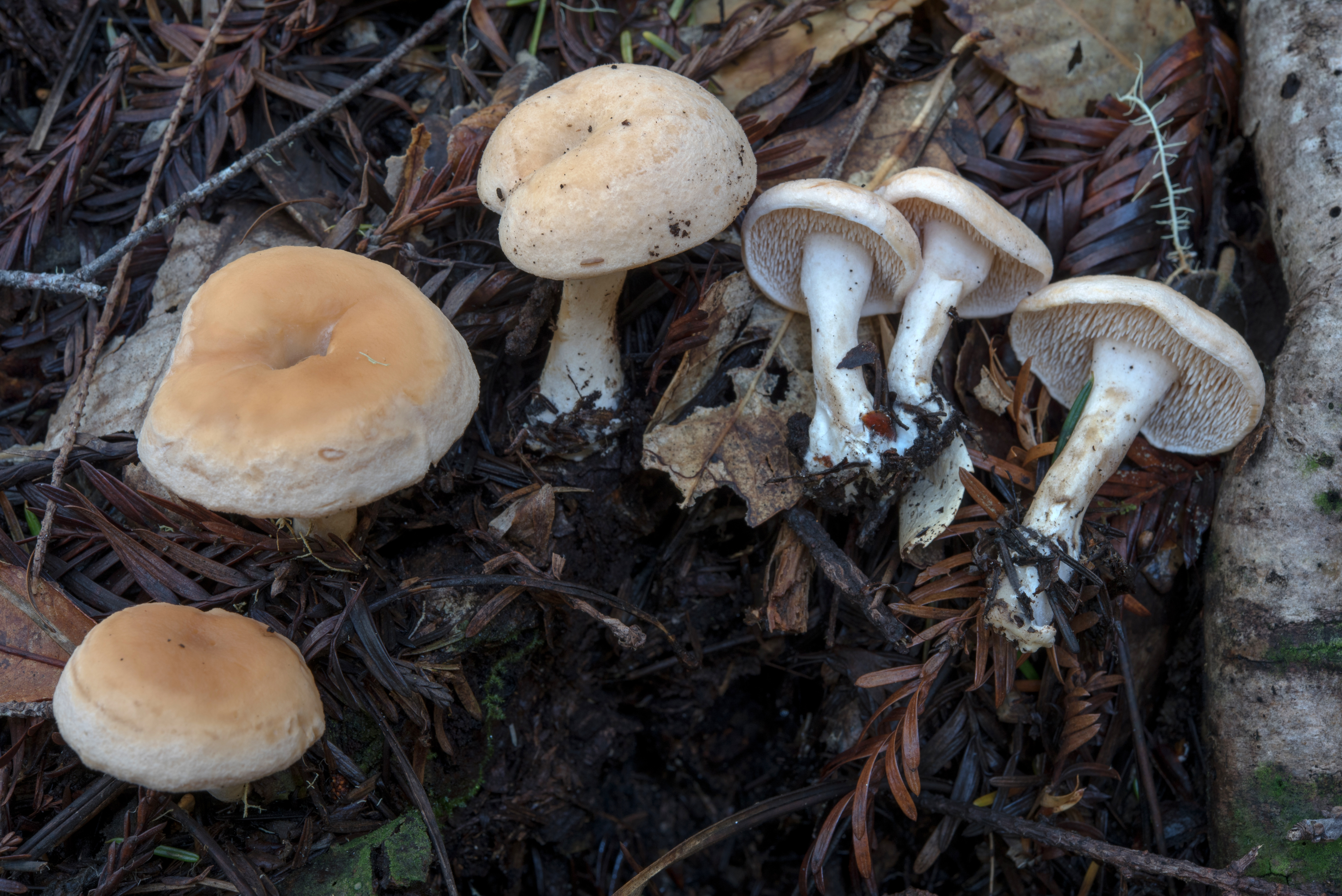

Scientific classification
- Domain: Eukaryota
- Kingdom: Fungi
- Division: Basidiomycota
- Class: Agaricomycetes
- Order: Cantharellales
- Family: Hydnaceae
- Genus: Hydnum
- Species: H. oregonense

Binomial name
- Hydnum oregonense Norvell, Liimat. & Niskanen (2018)

= Hydnum oregonense =

Species of fungus

Hydnum oregonense is a species of tooth fungus in the family Hydnaceae. It was scientifically described in 2018 by Norvell, Liimat. & Niskanen.

The cap is 1.5–4 centimetres (1/2–1 1/2 in) wide and tan–orange, with whitish areas. The teeth are 2–6 millimetres (1/8–1/4 in) long. The stem is 2–5 cm (3/4–2 in) long and 5–10 mm (1/4–3/8 in) thick. The flesh is whitish. The spore print is white. A few species in the genus are more robust and lack navels. Other lookalikes include Mycorphapium adustum and species of Hydnellum and Phellodon.

It is found near the west coast of North America, where it grows from November to March under conifer and tan oak trees. It is edible.
