= Phellodon nothofagi =

Scientific classification
- Domain: Eukaryota
- Kingdom: Fungi
- Division: Basidiomycota
- Class: Agaricomycetes
- Order: Thelephorales
- Family: Bankeraceae
- Genus: Phellodon
- Species: P. nothofagi

Binomial name
- Phellodon nothofagi McNabb (1971)

Species of fungus

Phellodon nothofagi is a species of tooth fungus in the family Bankeraceae. Found in New Zealand, it was described as new to science in 1971 by mycologist Robert Francis Ross McNabb.
