= Phellodon implicatus =

Scientific classification
- Domain: Eukaryota
- Kingdom: Fungi
- Division: Basidiomycota
- Class: Agaricomycetes
- Order: Thelephorales
- Family: Bankeraceae
- Genus: Phellodon
- Species: P. implicatus

Binomial name
- Phellodon implicatus R.E.Baird & S.R.Khan (1986)

Species of fungus

Phellodon implicatus is a species of tooth fungus in the family Bankeraceae. It was described as new to science in 1986 from collections made in Florida. It is one of the few Phellodon species known to possess clamp connections in its hyphae.
