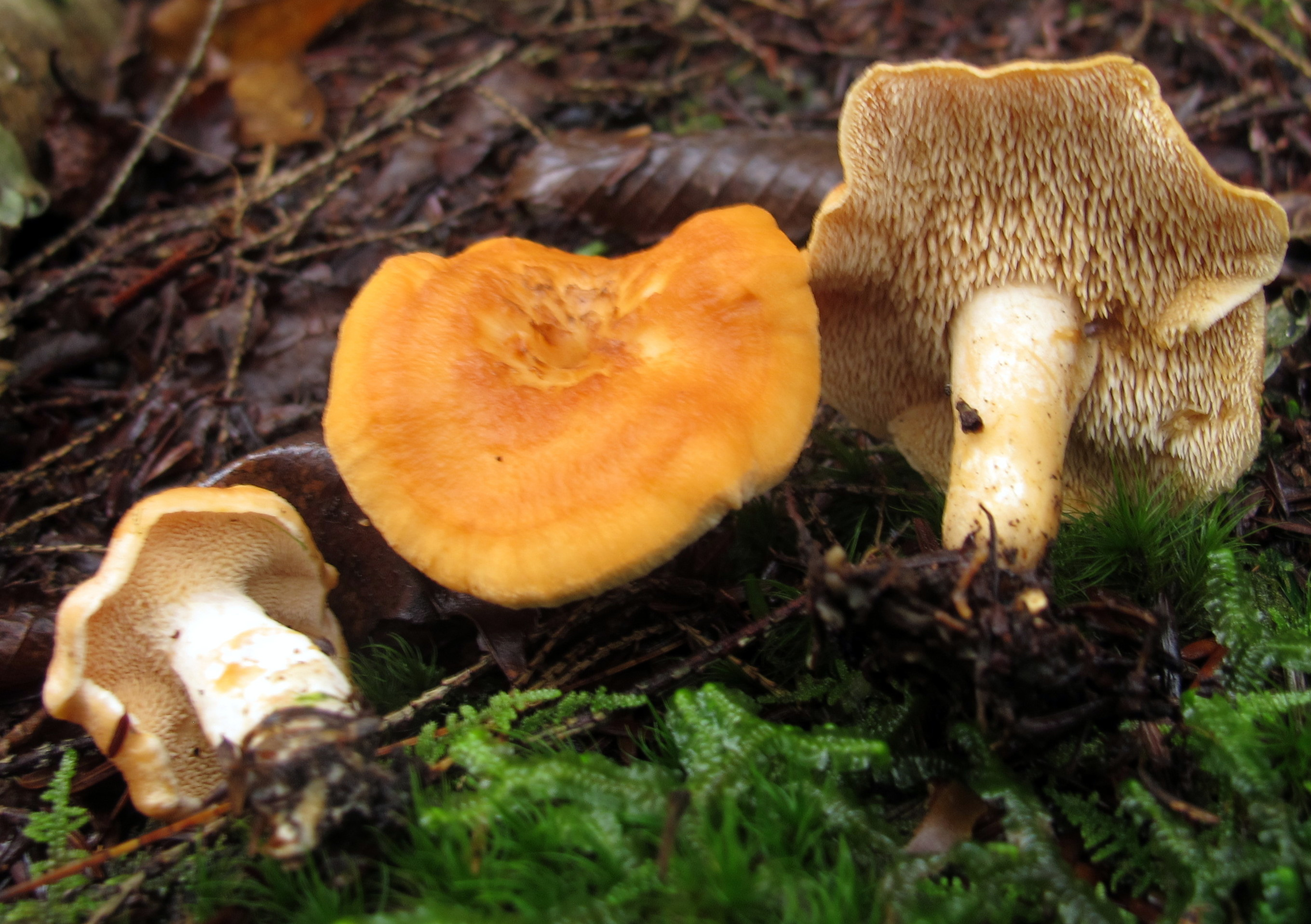

Scientific classification
- Kingdom: Fungi
- Division: Basidiomycota
- Class: Agaricomycetes
- Order: Cantharellales
- Family: Hydnaceae
- Genus: Hydnum
- Species: H. umbilicatum

Binomial name
- Hydnum umbilicatum Peck (1902)

Synonyms
- Dentinum umbilicatum (Peck) Pouzar (1956)

= Hydnum umbilicatum =

Species of fungus

Hydnum umbilicatum
- Mycological characteristics
- Teeth on hymenium
- Cap is umbilicate
- Hymenium is adnate
- Stipe is bare
- Spore print is white
- Ecology is mycorrhizal
- Edibility is edible

Hydnum umbilicatum, commonly known as the depressed hedgehog, is a species of tooth fungus in the family Hydnaceae. It was scientifically described in 1902 from New York by American mycologist Charles Horton Peck.

The cap is 2.5–4.5 centimetres (1–1 3/4 in) wide with spines up to 7 millimetres (1/4 in) long. The stem is 2–6 cm (3/4–2 1/4 in) long and 0.5–1 cm (1/4–1/2 in) thick. The spore print is white. The species can be confused with Hydnum repandum, a much larger species found in Europe.

Hydnum umbilicatum is found in eastern North America and associated with pines. The mushroom is edible and good.
