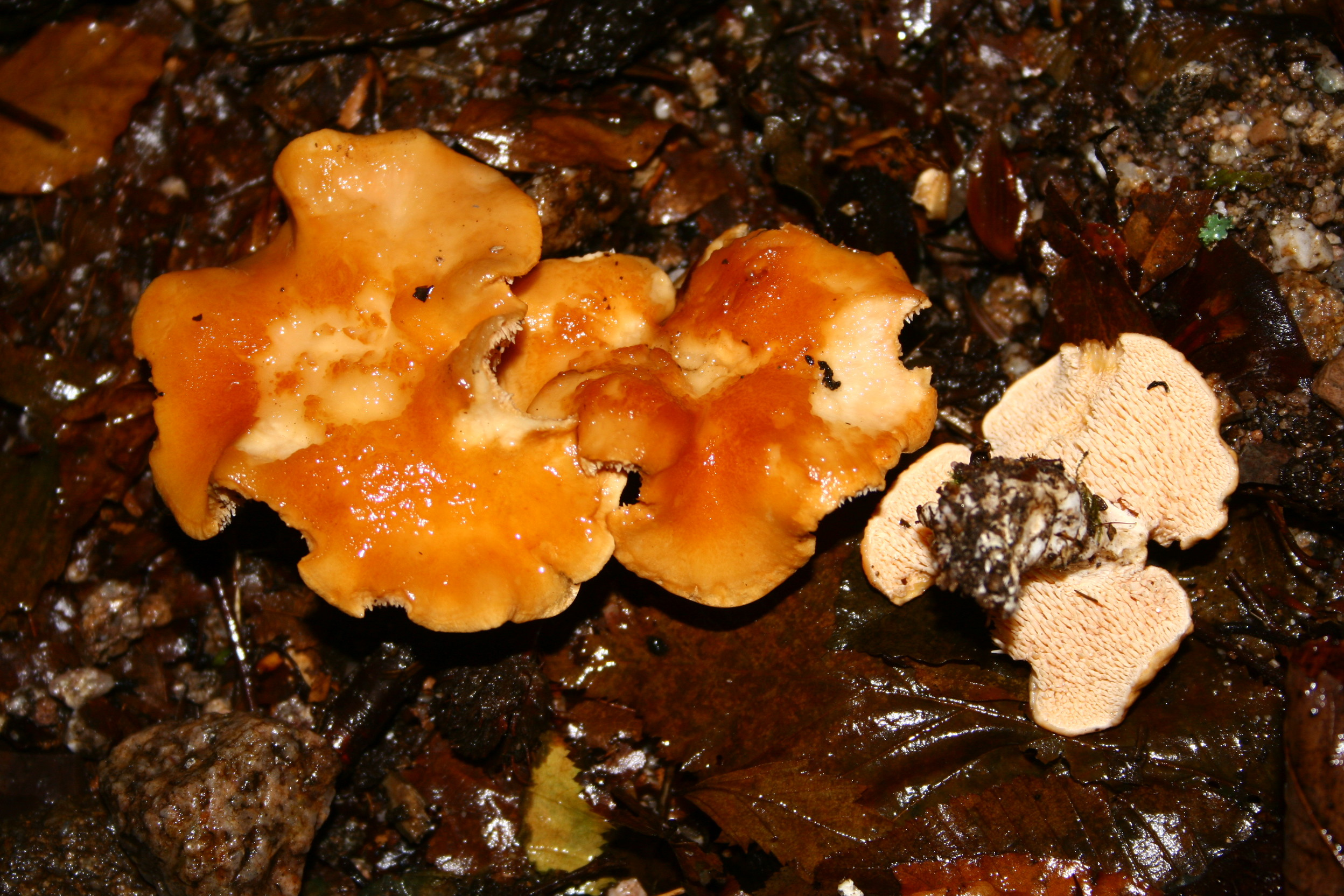

Scientific classification
- Domain: Eukaryota
- Kingdom: Fungi
- Division: Basidiomycota
- Class: Agaricomycetes
- Order: Cantharellales
- Family: Hydnaceae
- Genus: Hydnum
- Species: H. rufescens

Binomial name
- Hydnum rufescens Pers. (1800)

= Hydnum rufescens =

Species of fungus

Hydnum rufescens, commonly known as the terracotta hedgehog, is an edible basidiomycete of the family Hydnaceae. It belongs to the small group of mushrooms often referred to as the tooth fungi, which produce fruit bodies whose cap undersurfaces are covered by hymenophores resembling spines or teeth, and not pores or gills.

It is very similar to the more common hedgehog fungus (Hydnum repandum), and was previously sometimes considered a variety of that species. However, the following differences have been noted:

- the cap of H. rufescens is russet rather than beige,
- the overall dimensions are smaller and more regular in shape, with a central stipe,
- the spines are not decurrent, and
- the spores are slightly larger.

Both species are found in European coniferous and deciduous forests growing on soil. It is reportedly ectomycorrhizal with Picea abies, Pinus sylvestris, Fagus sylvatica and Quercus robur.
