= Phellodon radicatus =

Scientific classification
- Domain: Eukaryota
- Kingdom: Fungi
- Division: Basidiomycota
- Class: Agaricomycetes
- Order: Thelephorales
- Family: Bankeraceae
- Genus: Phellodon
- Species: P. radicatus

Binomial name
- Phellodon radicatus R.E.Baird (1985)

Species of fungus

Phellodon radicatus is a species of tooth fungus in the family Bankeraceae. It was described as new to science in 1985 from collections made in Gainesville, Florida.
