= Phellodon rufipes =

Scientific classification
- Domain: Eukaryota
- Kingdom: Fungi
- Division: Basidiomycota
- Class: Agaricomycetes
- Order: Thelephorales
- Family: Bankeraceae
- Genus: Phellodon
- Species: P. rufipes

Binomial name
- Phellodon rufipes Maas Geest. (1971)

Species of fungus

Phellodon rufipes is a species of tooth fungus in the family Bankeraceae. It was described as new to science in 1971 by Dutch mycologist Rudolph Arnold Maas Geesteranus, from collections made in Japan.
