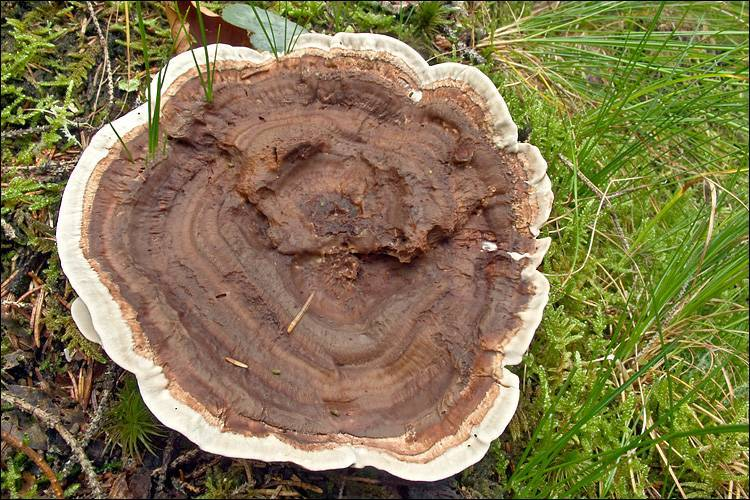

Scientific classification
- Kingdom: Fungi
- Division: Basidiomycota
- Class: Agaricomycetes
- Order: Thelephorales
- Family: Bankeraceae
- Genus: Phellodon
- Species: P. tomentosus

Binomial name
- Phellodon tomentosus (L.) Banker (1906)

Synonyms
- Hydnum tomentosum L. (1753); Calodon tomentosus (L.) Maire (1937)

= Phellodon tomentosus =

Species of fungus

Phellodon tomentosus, commonly known as the zoned phellodon or zoned cork hydnum, is a species of tooth fungus in the family Bankeraceae. First described as Hydnum tomentosum by Carl Linnaeus in 1753, it was transferred to the genus Phellodon by Howard James Banker in 1906.

The brown cap is 1.5–5 cm wide, broad, flat, or funnel-shaped, sometimes fused with others, zoned with a white margin, dry, thin, and fragrant-smelling; the taste is mild to bitter. The spines on the undersurface are 1–3 mm long, grayish-brown with pale tips, some running down the upper portion of the stalk. The flesh is brown. The stalk is 1–5 cm tall and 2–5 mm wide. The spores are white and more or less globose and spiny.

Similar species include Phellodon atratus, Coltricia cinnamomea, Sarcodon fuscoindicus.

The mushroom is found in Asia, Europe, and North America. It is inedible.
