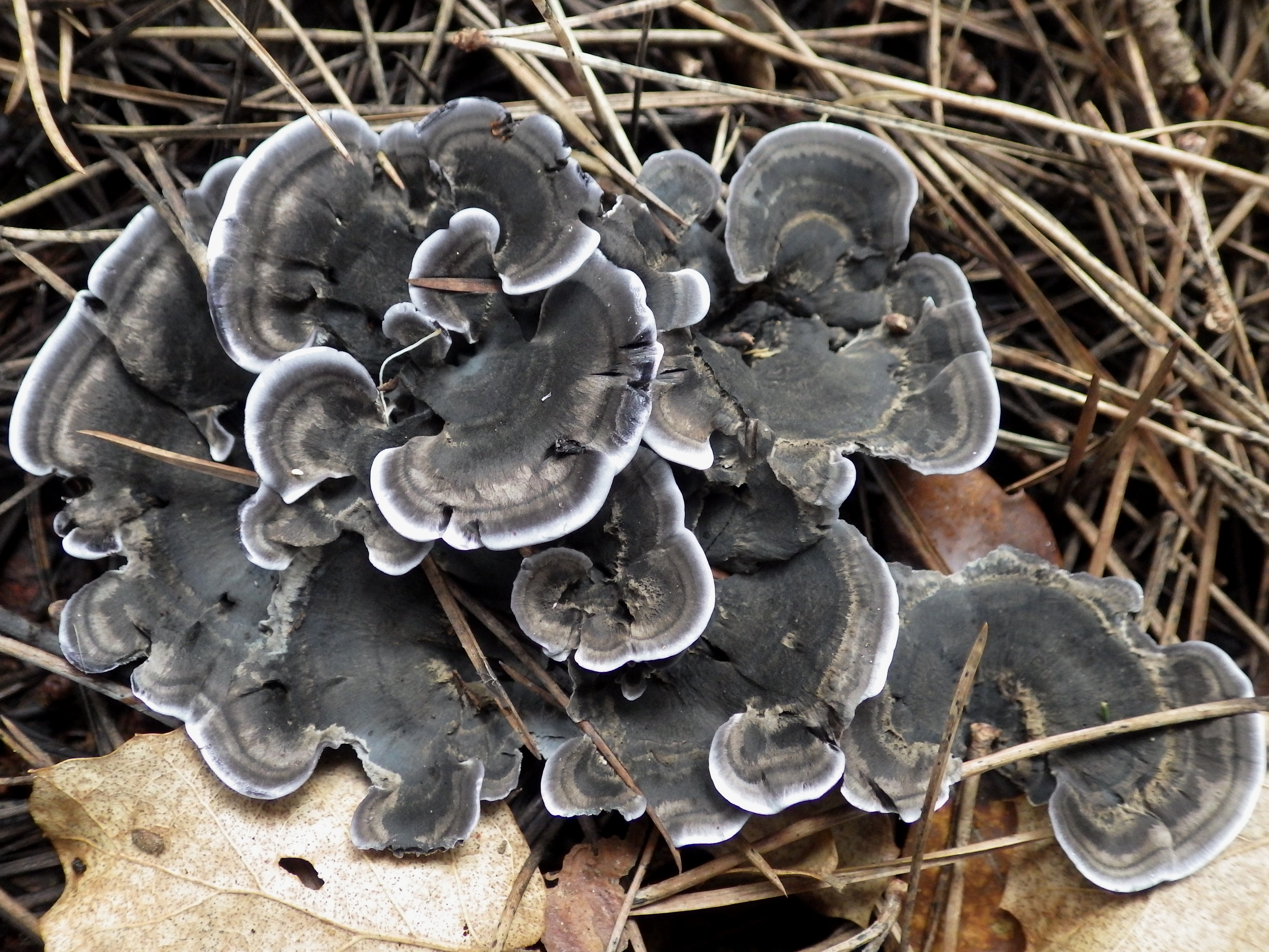

Scientific classification
- Domain: Eukaryota
- Kingdom: Fungi
- Division: Basidiomycota
- Class: Agaricomycetes
- Order: Thelephorales
- Family: Bankeraceae
- Genus: Phellodon
- Species: P. niger

Binomial name
- Phellodon niger (Fr.) P.Karst. (1881)

Synonyms
- Hydnum nigrum Fr. (1815); Hydnellum nigrum (Fr.) P.Karst. (1879); Calodon niger (Fr.) Quél. (1886)

= Phellodon niger =

Species of fungus

Phellodon niger, commonly known as the black tooth, is a species of tooth fungus in the family Bankeraceae, and the type species of the genus Phellodon. It was originally described by Elias Magnus Fries in 1815 as a species of Hydnum. Petter Karsten included it as one of the original three species when he circumscribed Phellodon in 1881. The fungus is found in Europe and North America, although molecular studies suggest that the North American populations represent a similar but genetically distinct species.

== Taxonomy ==
Phellodon niger was originally described by Swedish mycologist Elias Fries in 1815 as a species of Hydnum. The genus Phellodon was circumscribed in 1881 by Finnish mycologist Petter Karsten to contain white-toothed fungi. Karsten included three species: P. cyathiformis, P. melaleucus, and the type, P. niger (originally published with the epithet "nigrum").

The variety Phellodon niger var. alboniger, published by Kenneth Harrison in 1961, is considered synonymous with Phellodon melaleucus. Lucien Quélet's 1886 Calodon niger is a synonym of Phellodon niger. Taxonomic synonyms (i.e., based on a different type) include: Hydnum olidum (Berkeley, 1877); Hydnum cuneatum (Lloyd 1925); and Hydnum confluens (Peck 1874). The DNA sequences of the internal transcribed spacer regions of collections from the United Kingdom were compared with collections made in the Southern United States. They showed a 92–93% similarity, suggesting that the North American populations are a different species with very similar morphological characteristics.

Phellodon niger is commonly known as the "black scented spine fungus", and the "black tooth".

== Description ==
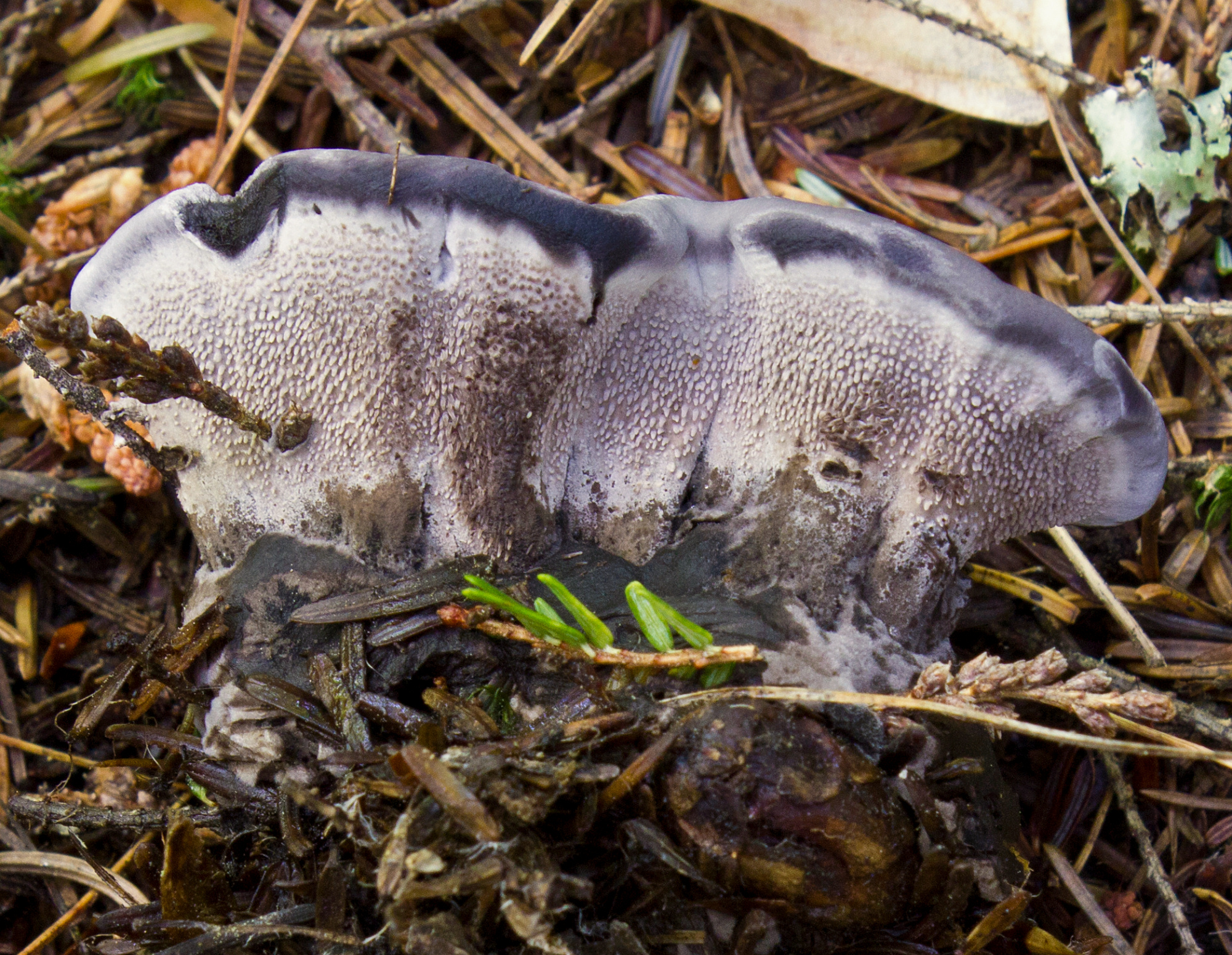
Underside of fruitbody, showing spines

Fruitbodies of Phellodon niger have a cap and a stipe, and so fall into the general class of "stipitate hydnoid fungi". Individual caps are up to 5 cm (2.0 in) in diameter, but caps of neighboring fruitbodies often fuse together to create larger compound growths. Caps are flat to depressed to somewhat funnel-shaped, with a felt-like texture at first before developing concentric pits, wrinkles, and ridges. Initially whitish (sometimes with purplish tints), the cap later darkens in the center to grey, grey-brown, or black. The stipe, measuring up to 4 cm (1.6 in) long, is roughly the same color as the cap. On the underside of the caps are grey spines, up to 4 mm long. The outer covering of the stipe is a thick felty layer of mycelium that absorbs water like a sponge. In conditions of high humidity, P. niger can form striking drops of black liquid on the actively growing caps. The flesh has an odor of fenugreek when it is dry. The mushroom tissue turns bluish-green when tested with a solution of potassium hydroxide.

The ellipsoid, hyaline (translucent) spores measure 3.5–5 by 3–4 μm. The basidia (spore-bearing cells) are club-shaped, four-spored, and measure 25–40 by 5–7 μm. Phellodon niger has a monomitic hyphal system, producing generative hyphae with a diameter of 2.5–5 μm.

This fungus is considered inedible.

== Habitat and distribution ==
The ectomycorrhizae that P. niger forms with Norway spruce (Picea abies) has been comprehensively described. It is distinguished from the ectomycorrhizae of other Thelephorales species by the unique shape of its chlamydospores. Stable isotope ratio analysis of the abundance of the stable isotope carbon-13 shows that P. niger has a metabolic signature close to that of saprotrophic fungi, indicating that it may be able to obtain carbon from sources other than a tree host.

Phellodon niger is found in continental Europe, where it has a widespread distribution, and in North America. In a preliminary assessment for a red list of threatened British fungi, P. niger is considered rare. In Switzerland, it is considered a vulnerable species. Phellodon niger was included in a Scottish study to develop species-specific PCR primers that can be used to detect the mycelia of stipitate hydnoids in soil. Collections labelled as P. niger from the United Kingdom that were DNA tested, revealed additional cryptic species. Analysis using PCR can determine the presence of a Phellodon species up to four years after the appearance of fruitbodies, allowing a more accurate determination of their possible decline and threat of extinction.

== Chemistry ==
Phellodon niger has been a source for several bioactive compounds: the cyathane-type diterpenoids, nigernin A and B; a terphenyl derivative called phellodonin (2',3'-diacetoxy-3,4,5',6',4''-pentahydroxy-p-terphenyl); grifolin; and 4-O-methylgrifolic acid. Additional nigernins (C through F) were reported in 2011.

Fruitbodies are used to make a gray-blue or green dye.
