= Phellodon tenuis =

Scientific classification
- Domain: Eukaryota
- Kingdom: Fungi
- Division: Basidiomycota
- Class: Agaricomycetes
- Order: Thelephorales
- Family: Bankeraceae
- Genus: Phellodon
- Species: P. tenuis

Binomial name
- Phellodon tenuis R.E.Baird (1988)

Species of fungus

Phellodon tenuis is a species of tooth fungus in the family Bankeraceae. Found in Brazil, it was described as new to science in 1988 by Richard Baird.
