= Phellodon mississippiensis =

Scientific classification
- Kingdom: Fungi
- Division: Basidiomycota
- Class: Agaricomycetes
- Order: Thelephorales
- Family: Bankeraceae
- Genus: Phellodon
- Species: P. mississippiensis

Binomial name
- Phellodon mississippiensis R.Baird (2014)

Species of fungus

Phellodon mississippiensis is a species of tooth fungus in the family Bankeraceae. It was described as new to science by mycologist Richard Baird in 2014 from collections made in the Tombigbee National Forest in Mississippi. It is one of the few Phellodon species with clamp connections in the hyphae.
