= Hydnum vesterholtii =

Scientific classification
- Kingdom: Fungi
- Division: Basidiomycota
- Class: Agaricomycetes
- Order: Cantharellales
- Family: Hydnaceae
- Genus: Hydnum
- Species: H. vesterholtii

Binomial name
- Hydnum vesterholtii Olariaga, Grebenc, Salcedo & M.P. Martín

Species of fungus

Hydnum vesterholtii is a species of fungus in the family Hydnaceae native to the southern and Central Europe and southwestern China.
