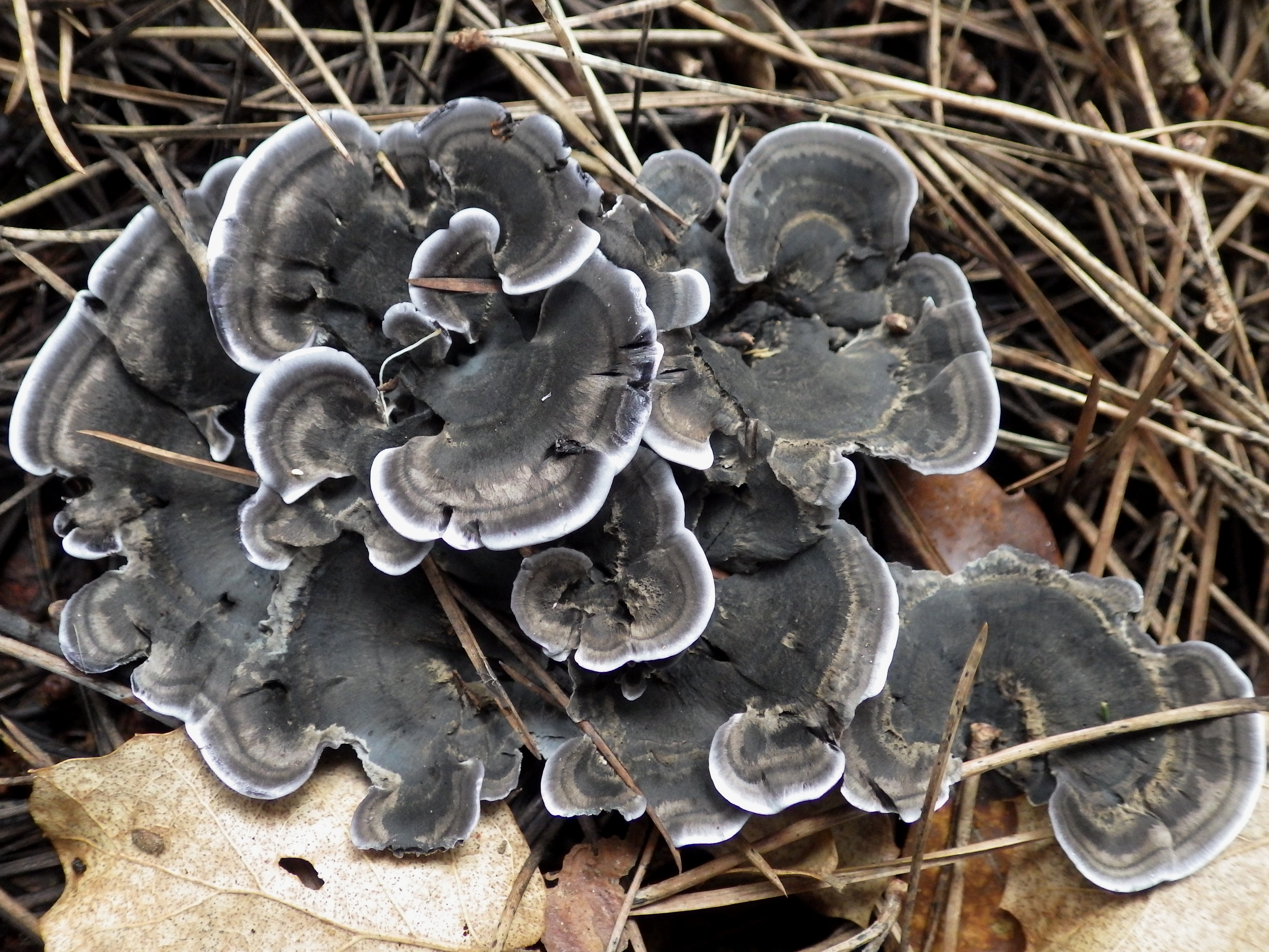
- Phellodon niger

Scientific classification
- Kingdom: Fungi
- Division: Basidiomycota
- Class: Agaricomycetes
- Order: Thelephorales
- Family: Bankeraceae
- Genus: Phellodon; P.Karst. (1881)

Type species
- Phellodon niger (Fr.) P.Karst. (as 'nigrum') (1881)

Species
- about 20

= Phellodon =

Genus of tooth fungi in the family Bankeraceae

Phellodon is a genus of tooth fungi in the family Bankeraceae. Species have small- to medium-sized fruitbodies with white spines on the underside from which spores are released. All Phellodon have a short stalk or stipe, and so the genus falls into the group known as stipitate hydnoid fungi. The tough and leathery flesh usually has a pleasant, fragrant odor, and develops a cork-like texture when dry. Neighboring fruitbodies can fuse, sometimes producing large mats of joined caps. Phellodon species produce a white spore print, while the individual spores are roughly spherical to ellipsoid in shape, with spiny surfaces.

The genus, with about 20 described species, has a distribution that includes to Asia, Europe, North America, South America, Australia, and New Zealand. About half of the species are found in the southeastern United States, including three species added to the genus in 2013–14. Several Phellodon species were placed on a preliminary Red List of threatened British fungi because of a general decline of the genus in Europe. Species grow in a symbiotic mycorrhizal association with trees from the families Fagaceae (beeches and oaks) and Pinaceae (pines). Accurate DNA-based methods have been developed to determine the presence of Phellodon species in the soil, even in the extended absence of visible fruitbodies. Although Phellodon fruitbodies are considered inedible due to their fibrous flesh, the type species, P. niger, is used in mushroom dyeing.

== Taxonomy ==
Phellodon was circumscribed in 1881 by Finnish mycologist Petter Karsten to contain white-toothed fungi. Karsten included three species: P. cyathiformis, P. melaleucus, and the type, P. niger (originally published with the epithet nigrum). P. nigrum was originally described by Elias Fries in 1815 as a species of Hydnum. Some early authors did not consider Phellodon distinct enough to be a separate genus, and folded species assigned to this genus into Hydnellum.

Hydnellum is classified in the family Bankeraceae, which was circumscribed by Marinus Anton Donk in 1961. Donk's original family concept included the genera Bankera and Phellodon, whose species produce hyaline (translucent) and echinulate spores (covered with small spines). Donk also noted that Bankeraceae species lacked clamp connections. When clamp connections were discovered in Phellodon fibulatus and tuberculate spore ornamentation (the presence of small nodules on the spores) was found in P. niger, Kenneth Harrison thought the family Bankeraceae was superfluous, and placed Phellodon and Bankera in the family Hydnaceae. This taxonomic rearrangement was rejected by Rudolph Arnold Maas Geesteranus in 1974, who showed that the tuberculate spores of P. niger were the result of an immature specimen. Richard Baird and Saeed Khan investigated spore ornamentation in North American Phellodon species using scanning electron microscopy, and rejected the placement of Phellodon in the Bankeraceae, preferring to leave it and Bankera in the Hydnaceae. Modern molecular phylogenetic analysis places Phellodon in the thelephoroid clade (roughly equivalent to the order Thelephorales) along with the related genera Bankera, Hydnellum, and Sarcodon. Although the status of the Bankeraceae has not been fully clarified with molecular genetic techniques, Phellodon is classified in this family by authorities on fungal taxonomy.

The generic name is derived from Greek phell-, meaning 'cork', and -don, meaning 'tooth'. In North America, Phellodon species are commonly known as "cork hydnums". The British Mycological Society, in their recommended list of common names for fungi in the United Kingdom, name Phellodon species in the form "descriptor word" plus tooth: fused tooth (P. confluens), grey tooth (P. melaleucus), black tooth (P. niger), and woolly tooth (P. tomentosus).

== Description ==
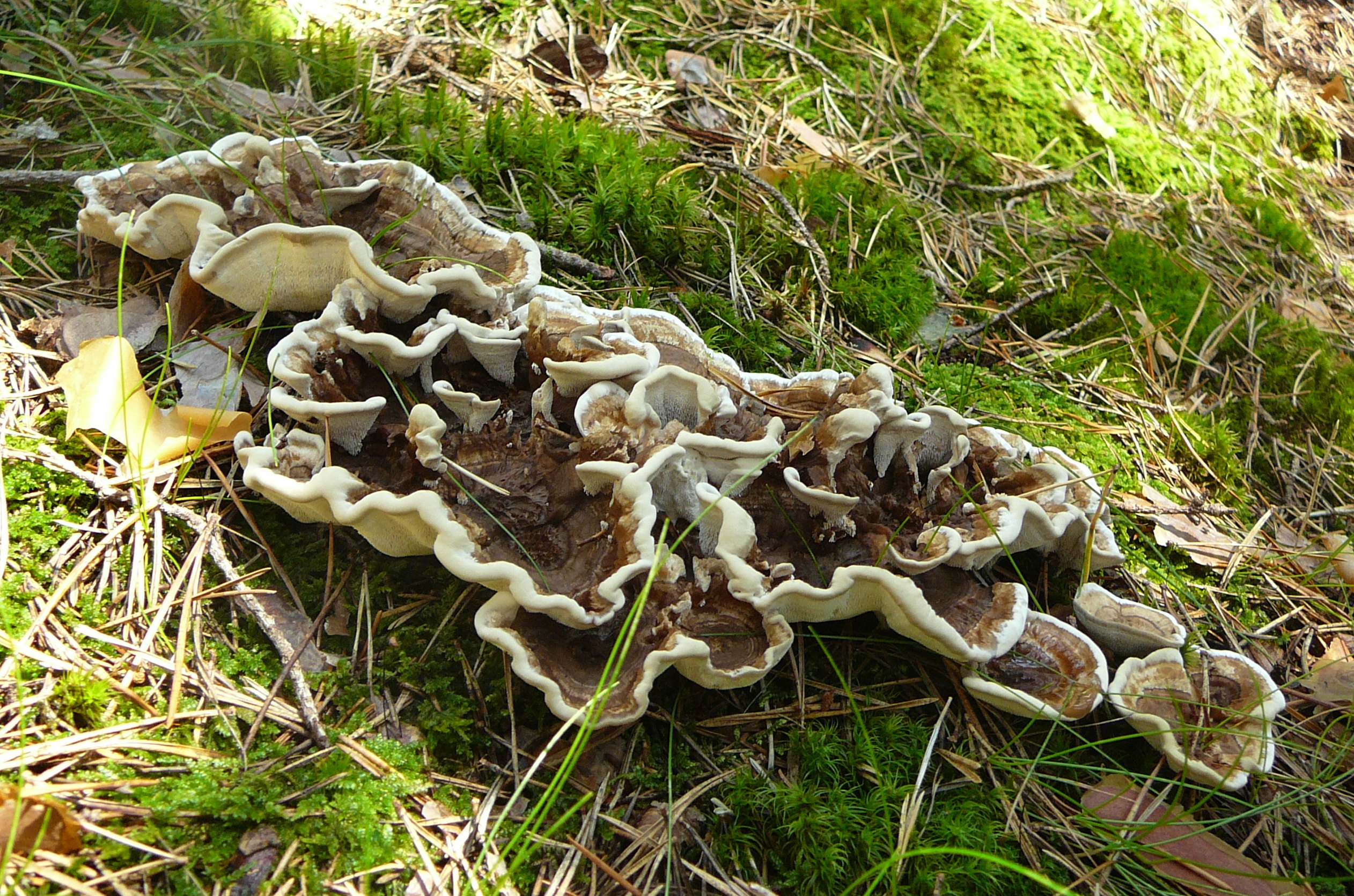
The caps of some Phellodon species (P. tomentosus pictured) can fuse during growth.

The fruit bodies of Phellodon species have caps and stipe, and thus fall into the general category of stipitate hydnoid fungi. The cap surfaces are initially velvety to tomentose, eventually becoming matted. The surface is rough, with pits and ridges, and sometimes with concentrical zones of color or texture. The color can vary considerably, from cream to yellowish, brownish, greenish, greyish or black. Neighboring fruitbodies can fuse, forming intertwined caps and partially fused stipes. Alexander H. Smith wrote of P. tomentosus, "It often occurs in large mats of fused caps almost producing a ceiling over large areas of the moss under conifers." Phellodon fruitbodies can envelop nearby grass or twigs. The stipe is thickly tomentose or smooth, typically the same color as the cap or darker. In P. niger, the outer covering of the stipe is a thick felty layer of mycelium that absorbs water like a sponge. The hymenophore (the fertile, spore-bearing surface) is on the underside of the cap. The spines become grey at maturity. In conditions of high humidity, P. niger can form striking drops of black liquid on the actively growing caps.

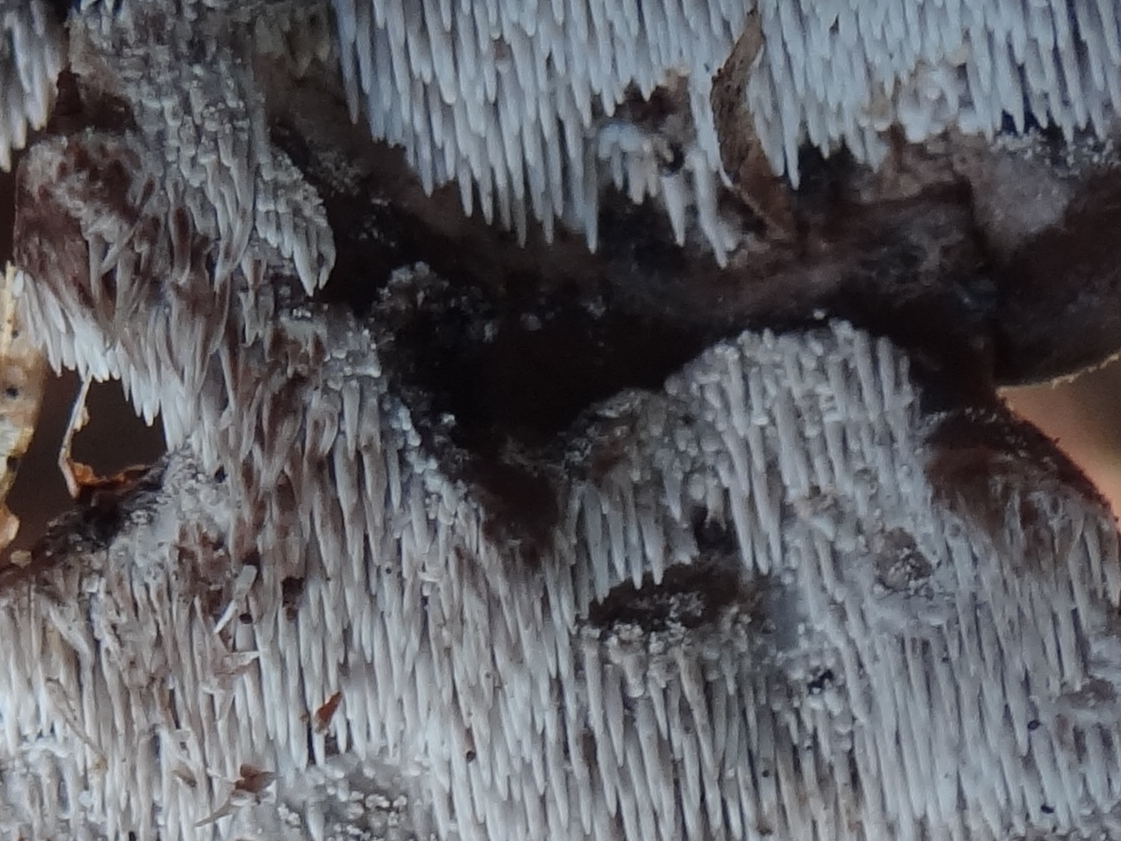
Spines of Phellodon tomentosus

The fibrous flesh is single to double-layered; duplex layering results from differences in compactness or in the alignment of the constituent hyphae. Tough and leathery when fresh, the flesh develops a corklike texture when dry. In the dried state it often has an odor of fenugreek or curry powder. Phellodon species are often free of insect damage, suggesting that they may have defensive chemicals that deter predation. Fruitbodies are not considered edible due to their fibrous flesh.

The hyphal system is monomitic, containing only generative hyphae. These hyphae are not less than 6 μm in diameter. All European species lack clamp connections, but they are present in the North American species P. fibulatus and P. mississippiensis. The basidia (spore-bearing cells) are four-spored. Cystidia are either absent, or present infrequently as incompletely differentiated cystidioles (sterile cells about the size of an immature basidium). In mass, the spores are white. Spores are broadly ellipsoid to roughly spherical, and echinulose (covered with small spines). They are also hyaline and inamyloid.

== Habitat and distribution ==
Fruit bodies grow on the ground. Phellodon species, like all members of the order Thelephorales, are thought to be mycorrhizal, forming symbiotic relationships with trees. Usual hosts include species from the families Fagaceae (beeches and oaks) and Pinaceae. The ectomycorrhizae that P. niger forms with Norway spruce (Picea abies) has been comprehensively described. It is distinguished from the ectomycorrhizae of other Thelephorales species by the unique shape of its chlamydospores. Stable isotope ratio analysis of the abundance of the stable isotope carbon-13 shows that P. niger has a metabolic signature close to that of saprotrophic fungi, indicating that it may be able to obtain carbon from sources other than a tree host.

Many Phellodon species are known from the southeastern United States, where they have been extensively researched. According to Baird and colleagues, there are nine distinct Phellodon species from Great Smoky Mountains and the surrounding southern Appalachian Mountains. Three additional species from this area, P. mississippiensis, P. brunneo-olivaceus, and P. fuligineoalbus were added to the genus in 2013–14.

== Conservation ==
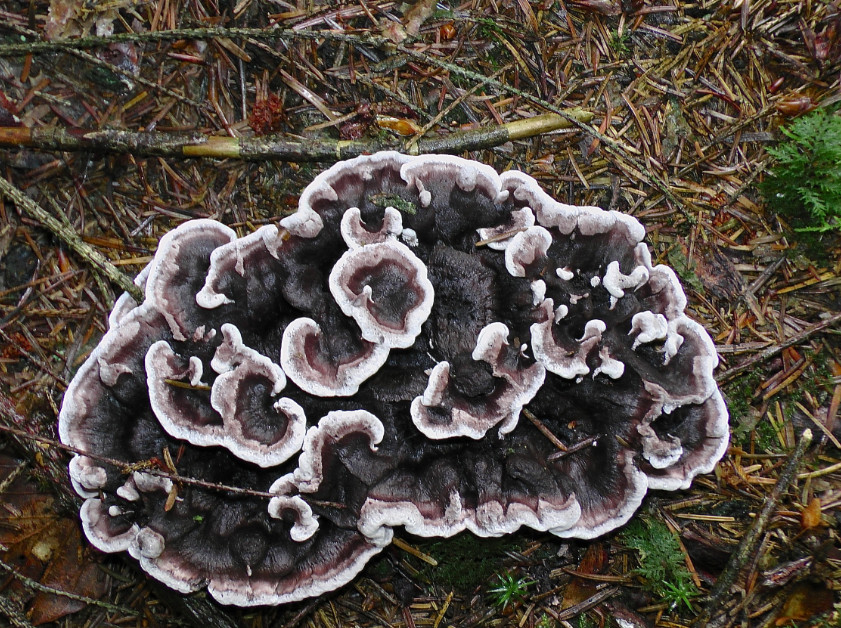
Phellodon melaleucus

Phellodon species, like other members of the family Bankeraceae, are sensitive to air pollution and soil pollution, and are in general decline in western Europe. In a preliminary assessment for a red list of threatened British Fungi, P. confluens, P. tomentosus, and P. melaleucus are considered vulnerable, and P. niger is rare.

Conservation efforts for stipitate hydnoid fungi are hampered by a dearth of information about their basic ecology, and so molecular genetic techniques are increasingly employed in attempts to better understand these fungi. In the case of Phellodon tomentosus, for example, there is little correlation between fruitbody appearance and below-ground mycelium, making it hard to determine the distribution and rarity of the fungus with standard surveying techniques. Phellodon melaleucus and P. niger were included in a Scottish study to develop species-specific PCR primers that can be used to detect the mycelia of stipitate hydnoids in soil. DNA testing of collections labelled as P. melaleucus and P. niger from the United Kingdom revealed additional cryptic species. PCR analysis can be used to determine the presence of a Phellodon species up to four years after the appearance of fruitbodies, allowing a more accurate determination of their possible decline and threat of extinction.

== Chemistry ==
Phellodon species contain thelephoric acid, a metabolite of the shikimic acid pathway. Thelephoric acid is a terphenyl quinone—a 1,4-benzoquinone wherein positions carbon-2 and carbon-5 are substituted with phenyl groups. The hirsutane derivative phellodonic acid is found in P. melaleucus. Phellodonic acid, which exhibits antibiotic activity towards bacteria and other fungi, was the first bioactive compound reported from any member of the order Thelephorales. A total synthesis was described for phellodonic acid in 2008 using cis-1,2-dihydrocatechol as the starting material. P. niger has been a source for several bioactive compounds: the cyathane-type diterpenoids, nigernin A and B; a nitrogenous terphenyl derivative, phellodonin; 2',3'-diacetoxy-3,4,5',6',4''-pentahydroxy-p-terphenyl; grifolin; and 4-O-methylgrifolic acid. P. niger has also been used for mushroom dyeing, in which it produces gray-blue and green colors.

== Species ==
Phellodon was originally circumscribed with three species. Joost Stalpers included 13 Phellodon species in his 1993 monograph on the Thelephorales. The tenth edition of the Dictionary of the Fungi (2008) indicated 16 species in the genus. As of September 2015, Index Fungorum lists 18 species of Phellodon, not including the three eastern United States species added in 2013–14.

Image	Scientific name	Distribution
	Phellodon atratus K.A.Harrison (1964)	California, United States
	Phellodon brunneo-olivaceus R.E.Baird (2013)	United States
	Phellodon confluens (Pers.) Pouzar (1956)	China, eastern United States, Europe
	Phellodon excentrimexicanus R.E.Baird (1985)	Mexico
	Phellodon fibulatus K.A.Harrison (1972)	North Carolina, United States
	Phellodon fuligineoalbus (J.C.Schmidt) Baird (2013)	United States
	Phellodon implicatus R.E.Baird & S.R.Khan (1986)	Florida, United States
	Phellodon indicus Khara (1978)	Himachal Pradesh, India
	Phellodon maliensis (Lloyd) Maas Geest. (1966)	Australia, New Zealand
	Phellodon melaleucus (Sw. ex Fr.) P.Karst. (1881)	Europe, North America
	Phellodon mississippiensis R.Baird (2014)	Mississippi, United States
	Phellodon niger (Fr.) P.Karst. (1881)	Europe, North America
	Phellodon nothofagi McNabb (1971)	New Zealand
	Phellodon plicatus (Lloyd) Maas Geest. (1966)	Australia
	Phellodon putidus (G.F.Atk.) Banker (1906)	North America
	Phellodon radicatus R.E.Baird (1985)	North America
	Phellodon rufipes Maas Geest. (1971)	Japan
	Phellodon secretus Niemelä & Kinnunen (2003) –Finland	
	Phellodon sinclairii (Berk.) G.Cunn. (1958)	New Zealand
	Phellodon tenuis R.E.Baird (1988)	Brazil
	Phellodon tomentosus (L.) Banker (1906)	Europe, North America
