= Hydnum magnorufescens =

Scientific classification
- Domain: Eukaryota
- Kingdom: Fungi
- Division: Basidiomycota
- Class: Agaricomycetes
- Order: Cantharellales
- Family: Hydnaceae
- Genus: Hydnum
- Species: H. magnorufescens

Binomial name
- Hydnum magnorufescens Vizzini

Species of fungus

Hydnum magnorufescens is a species of fungus in the family Hydnaceae native to the southern Europe, Sichuan Province in China and Russia.
