= Phellodon indicus =

Scientific classification
- Domain: Eukaryota
- Kingdom: Fungi
- Division: Basidiomycota
- Class: Agaricomycetes
- Order: Thelephorales
- Family: Bankeraceae
- Genus: Phellodon
- Species: P. indicus

Binomial name
- Phellodon indicus Khara (1978)

Species of fungus

Phellodon indicus is a species of tooth fungus in the family Bankeraceae. Found in Himachal Pradesh, India, it was described as new to science in 1978.
