= Phellodon putidus =

Scientific classification
- Domain: Eukaryota
- Kingdom: Fungi
- Division: Basidiomycota
- Class: Agaricomycetes
- Order: Thelephorales
- Family: Bankeraceae
- Genus: Phellodon
- Species: P. putidus

Binomial name
- Phellodon putidus (G.F.Atk.) Banker (1906)

Synonyms
- Hydnum putidum G.F.Atk. (1900); Phellodon cokeri Banker (1919); Phellodon hesleri Coker (1939); Calodon putidus (G.F.Atk.) S.Ito (1955)

Species of fungus

Phellodon putidus is a species of tooth fungus in the family Bankeraceae. Found in North America, it was first described scientifically by George F. Atkinson as Hydnum putidum in 1900. Howard James Banker transferred it to the genus Phellodon in 1906.
