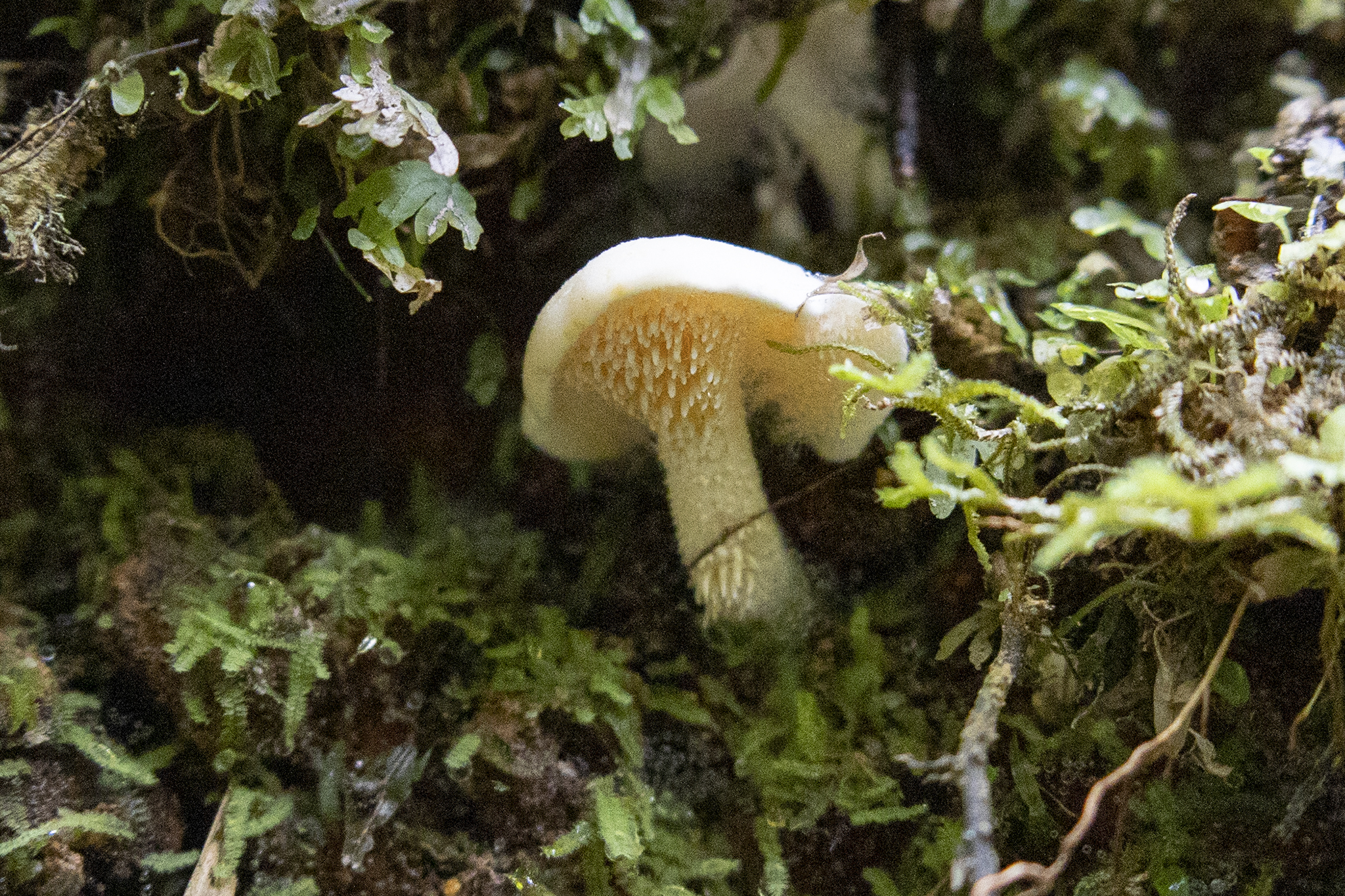
- H. crocidens var. wellingtonii

Scientific classification
- Domain: Eukaryota
- Kingdom: Fungi
- Division: Basidiomycota
- Class: Agaricomycetes
- Order: Cantharellales
- Family: Hydnaceae
- Genus: Hydnum
- Species: H. crocidens

Binomial name
- Hydnum crocidens Cooke

Synonyms
- Hydnum ambustum Cooke

= Hydnum crocidens =

Species of fungus

Hydnum crocidens is a species of fungus in the family Hydnaceae native to Australia. It was described in 1890 by Mordecai Cubitt Cooke from material collected around Port Phillip Bay. Genetic analysis shows it to be closely related to a lineage containing H. rufescens and its close relatives.
