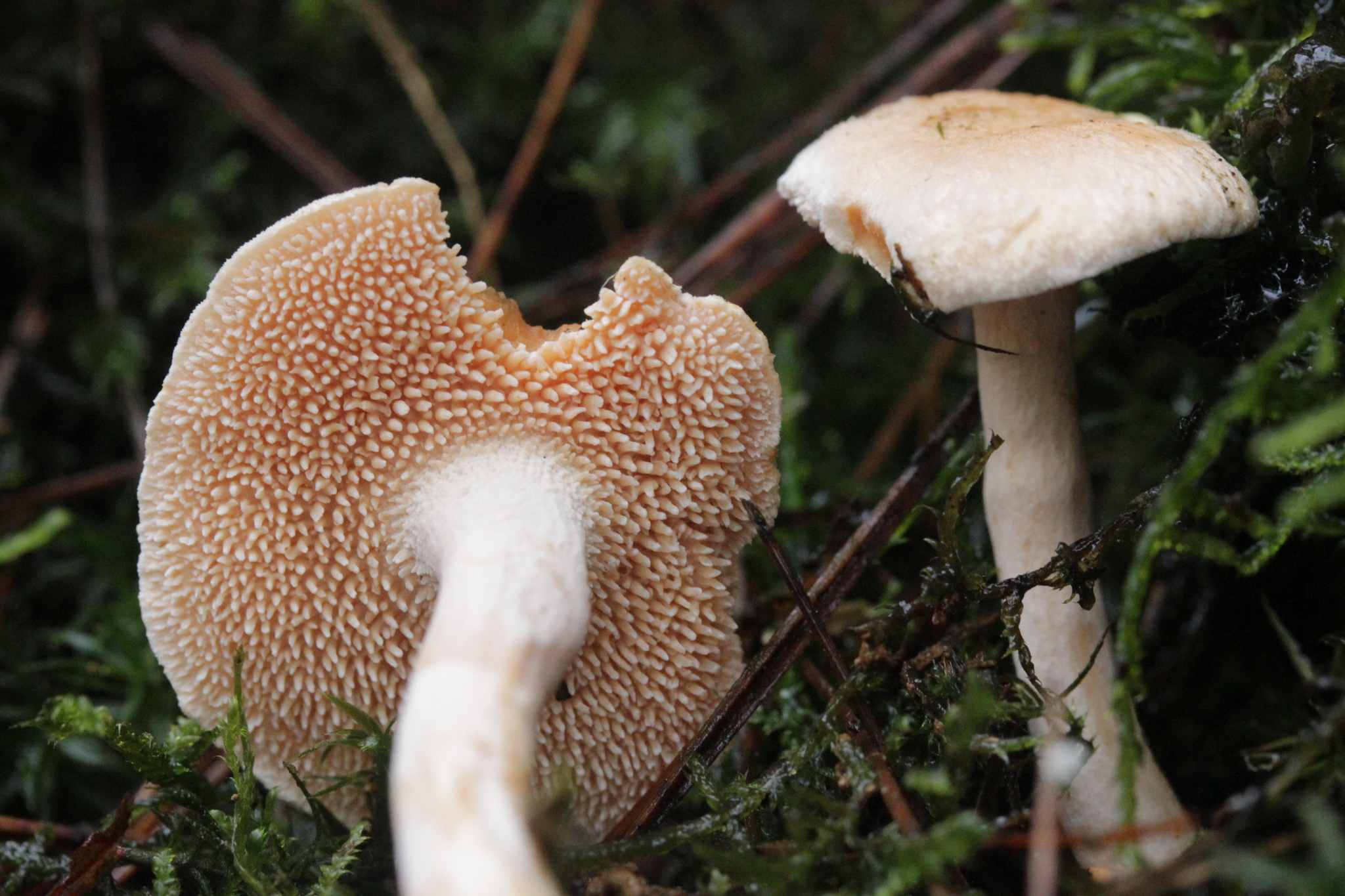
- Hydnum ellipsosporum

Scientific classification
- Domain: Eukaryota
- Kingdom: Fungi
- Division: Basidiomycota
- Class: Agaricomycetes
- Order: Cantharellales
- Family: Hydnaceae
- Genus: Hydnum
- Species: H. ellipsosporum

Binomial name
- Hydnum ellipsosporum Ostrow & Beenken, 2004

= Hydnum ellipsosporum =

Species of fungus

Hydnum ellipsosporum is a species of fungus in the family Hydnaceae that was described from Germany in 2004. It differs from H. repandum by the shape and length of its spores, which are ellipsoid and measure 9–11 by 6–7.5 μm. Compared to H. repandum, it has smaller fruit bodies, with cap diameters ranging from 3 to 5 cm (1.2 to 2.0 in) wide.
