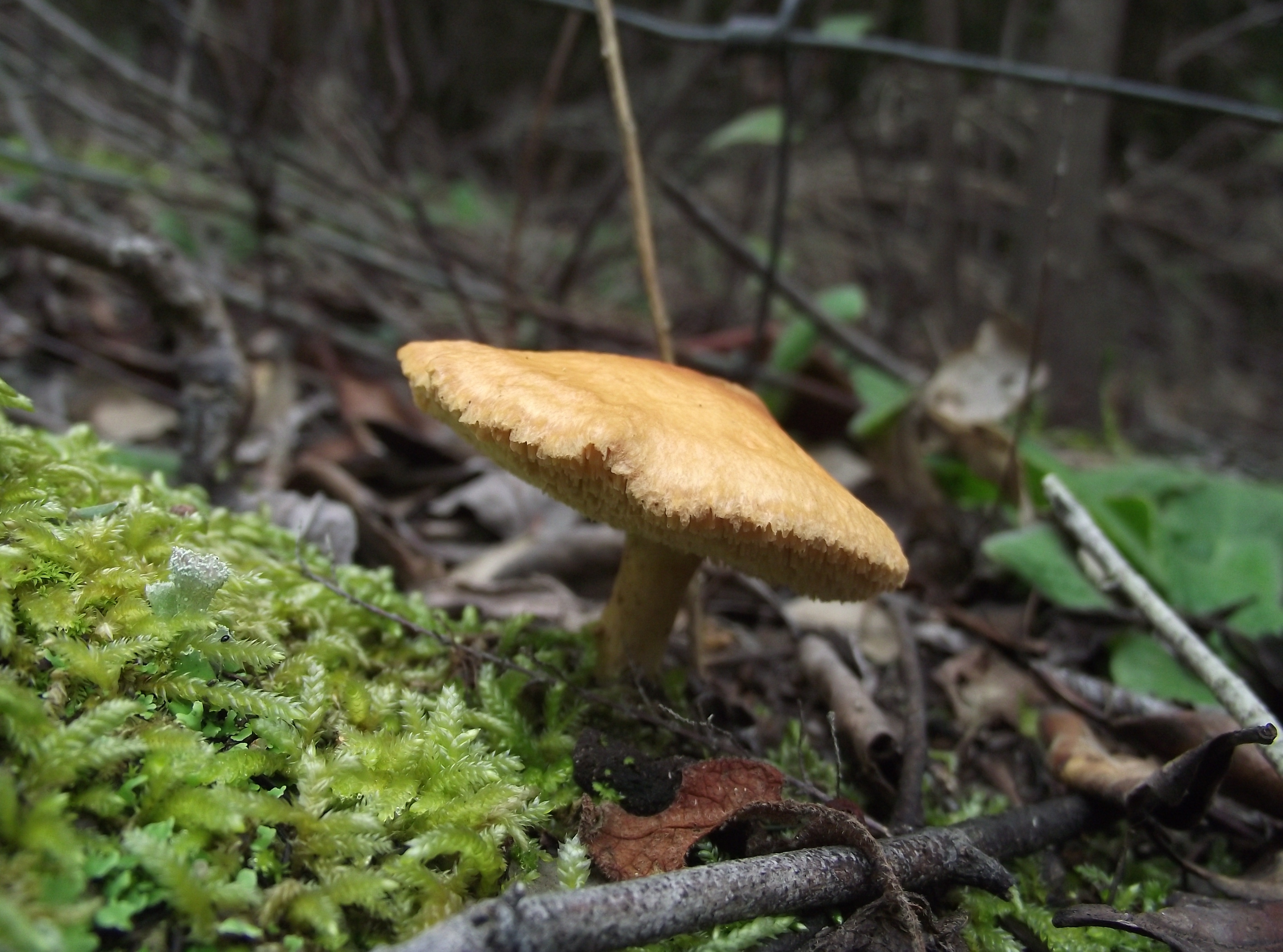
- Hydnum ovoideisporum at Sibiri, Gonnosfanadiga, Sardinia, Italy

Scientific classification
- Kingdom: Fungi
- Division: Basidiomycota
- Class: Agaricomycetes
- Order: Cantharellales
- Family: Hydnaceae
- Genus: Hydnum
- Species: H. ovoideisporum

Binomial name
- Hydnum ovoideisporum Olariaga, Grebenc, Salcedo, & M.P. Martín

= Hydnum ovoideisporum =

Species of fungus

Hydnum ovoideisporum is a species of fungus in the family Hydnaceae native to the southern Europe.
