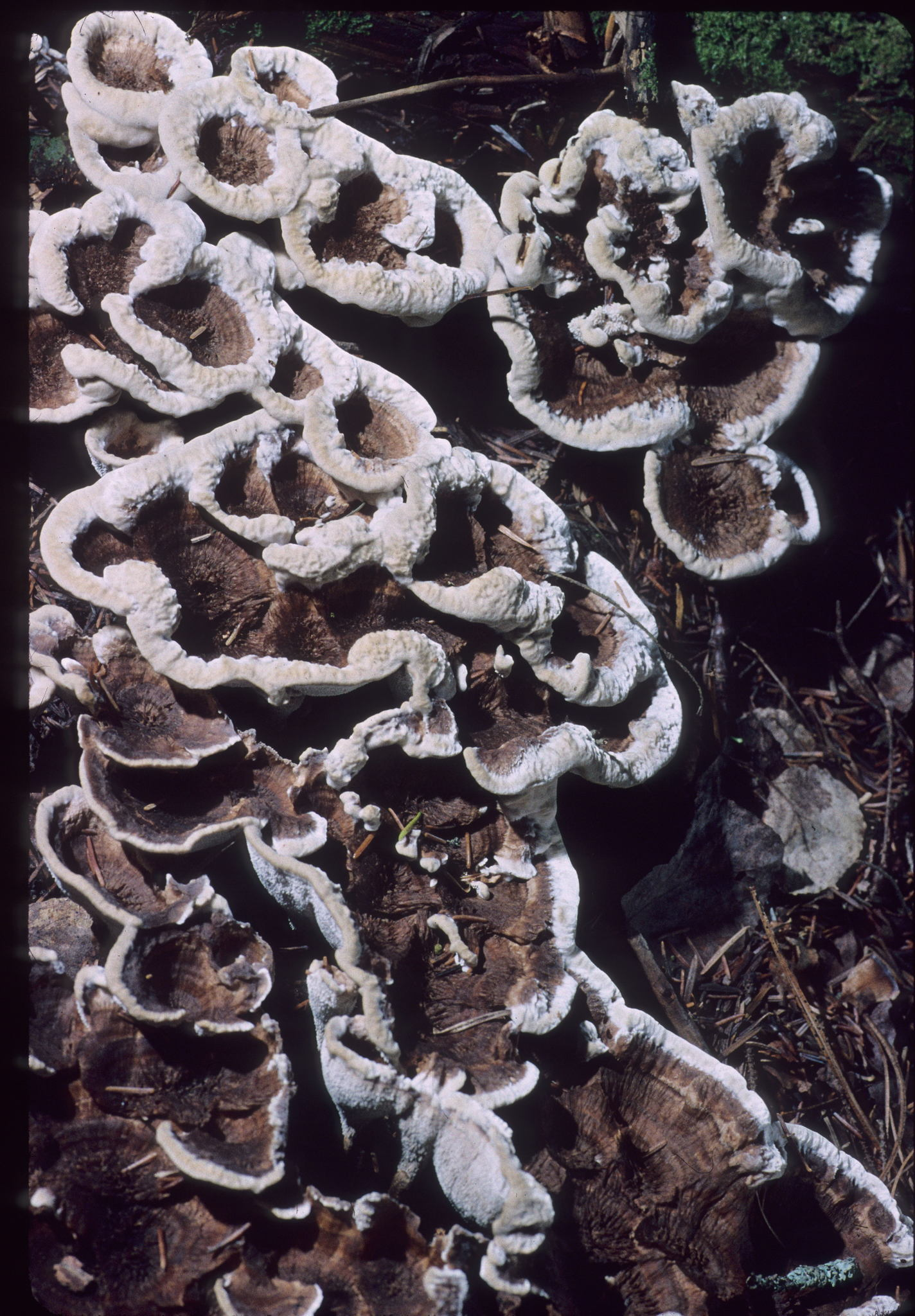

Scientific classification
- Kingdom: Fungi
- Division: Basidiomycota
- Class: Agaricomycetes
- Order: Thelephorales
- Family: Bankeraceae
- Genus: Phellodon
- Species: P. confluens

Binomial name
- Phellodon confluens (Pers.) Pouzar (1956)

Synonyms
- List: Hydnum confluens Pers. (1825); Hydnum amicum Quél. (1880); Calodon amicus (Quél.) Quél. (1884); Sarcodon amicus (Quél.) Quél. (1886); Phellodon amicus (Quél.) Banker (1913); Hydnellum amicum (Quél.) Ragab (1953); Hydnum vellereum Peck (1898); Phellodon vellereus (Peck) Banker (1906); Phellodon confluens var. corrugatus Khara (1978)

= Phellodon confluens =

Species of tooth fungus

Phellodon confluens, commonly known as the fused cork hydnum, is a species of tooth fungus in the family Bankeraceae. The fungus produces firm, corky fruit bodies with caps that are initially whitish grey before darkening to brown or black with age, and these caps often fuse together to form clusters. Its underside features small tooth-like spines rather than gills or pores, which are white to pale grey in colour. The species has a northern hemisphere distribution, found in forested areas of Asia, Europe, and North America, typically associated with oak trees.

== Taxonomy ==
The fungus was originally described in 1825 as Hydnum confluens by Christiaan Hendrik Persoon. The Czech mycologist Zdenek Pouzar transferred it to the genus Phellodon in 1956.

== Description ==
Phellodon confluens produces fruit bodies (or basidiocarps) with a firm, corky texture. The cap (or pileus) is round to irregular in outline and varies from 3–9 cm in diameter, often fusing with adjacent caps to form clusters. Young caps are whitish grey and smooth (glabrous) but darken to brown or almost black as they age. The cap surface may be slightly depressed or pitted and frequently gives rise to new, smaller pilei at its margin. On the underside, the hymenophore (the fertile, spore-bearing surface) is densely "toothed" (hydnoid) rather than gilled or pored, with individual spines up to 3 mm long that are white to pale grey. The flesh (context) is organised in two layers (duplex), especially noticeable in the stalk, and ranges from pinkish brown to dark brown. When tasted, the flesh has a faintly spicy note.

The stalk (stipe) measures 10–40 by 10–20 mm, is covered in a fine, woolly (tomentose) grey to dark brown surface and firmly supports the cap. Microscopically, the fungus has a monomitic hyphal system—containing only generative hyphae—that are simple-septate (each cell divided by a single cross-wall), translucent (hyaline) and 3–6 μm wide. Its spores are roughly elliptic, 3.5–4 by 3–4 μm in size, hyaline and adorned with minute spines.

== Habitat and distribution ==
The fungus has a northern hemisphere distribution and is found in Asia, Europe, and North America. It is considered vulnerable in Switzerland. In northern Europe, the fungus follows the distribution of its host tree (Quercus), extending to central Sweden and to southern Finland.
