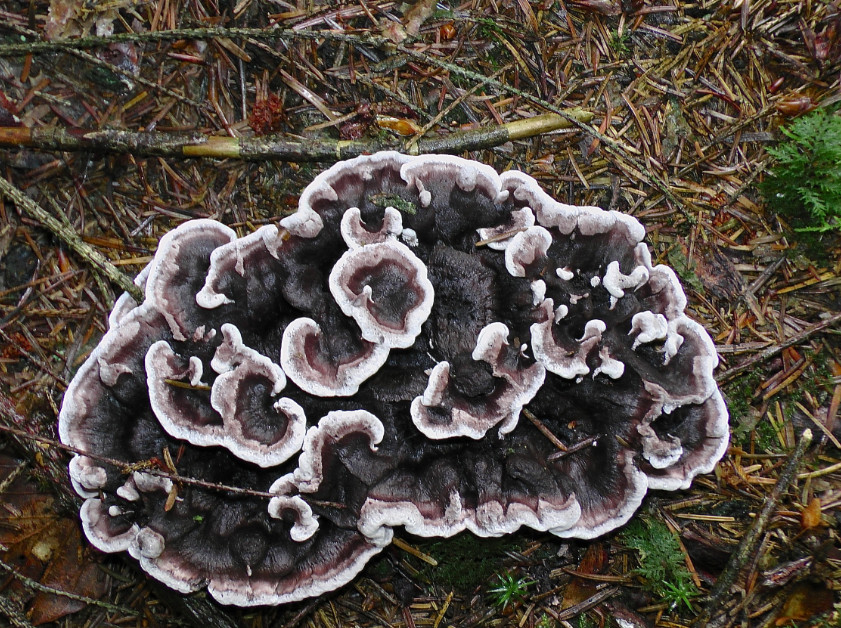

Scientific classification
- Kingdom: Fungi
- Division: Basidiomycota
- Class: Agaricomycetes
- Order: Thelephorales
- Family: Bankeraceae
- Genus: Phellodon
- Species: P. melaleucus

Binomial name
- Phellodon melaleucus (Sw. ex Fr.) P.Karst. (1881)

Synonyms
- Hydnum melaleucum Sw. ex Fr. (1815); Hydnellum melaleucum (Sw. ex Fr.) P.Karst. (1879)

= Phellodon melaleucus =

Species of fungus

Phellodon melaleucus, commonly known as the grey tooth, is a species of tooth fungus in the family Bankeraceae. It was originally described by Elias Magnus Fries in 1815 as a species of Hydnum. In 1881, Petter Karsten included it as one of the original three species in his newly circumscribed genus Phellodon. The fungus is widely distributed in Europe and North America, where it associates mycorrhizally with a wide range of host trees. It is considered vulnerable in Switzerland.

== Description ==
The grey tooth is a small to medium-sized fungus with a leathery or corky fruiting body. On the underside it has pale grayish-brown spines from which spores are released rather than from gills. It may look like a convoluted single fruiting body but in fact each part has a blackish stem, and several caps can fuse together. The cap tends to be concentrically zoned with a reddish-brown to blackish-brown centre and a pale edge. The flesh is greyish-brown, darker near the base of the stem, and smells of fenugreek.

== Distribution and habitat ==
This species occurs in various parts of Europe and has been recorded in North America. It is uncommon in the United Kingdom and very rare in Ireland. This is an ectomycorrhizal species that forms a symbiotic relationship with the roots of various plants, usually trees; the hyphae of the fungus wrap round the rootlets of the host tree, and there is an exchange of nutrients between the two. It is typically found growing on the ground on mossy banks in the vicinity of its hosts. In the British Isles it is associated with various trees including oak, beech, sweet chestnut, birch, Scots pine and spruce.
