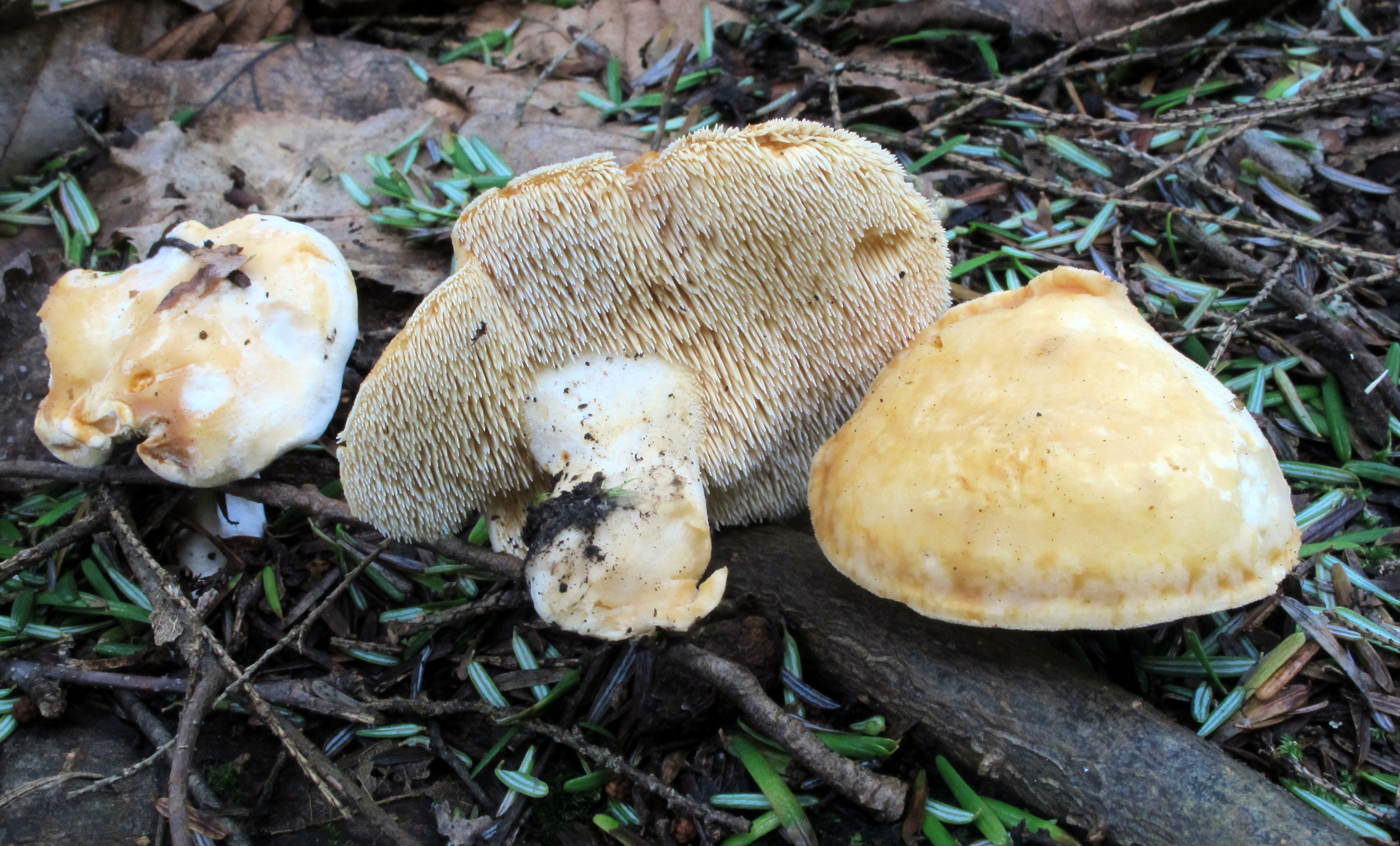
- In Hocking State Forest, Ohio

Scientific classification
- Kingdom: Fungi
- Division: Basidiomycota
- Class: Agaricomycetes
- Order: Cantharellales
- Family: Hydnaceae
- Genus: Hydnum
- Species: H. albidum

Binomial name
- Hydnum albidum Peck

= Hydnum albidum =

Species of fungus

Hydnum albidum, commonly known as the white hedgehog, is an edible species of fungus in the family Hydnaceae native to North America.
