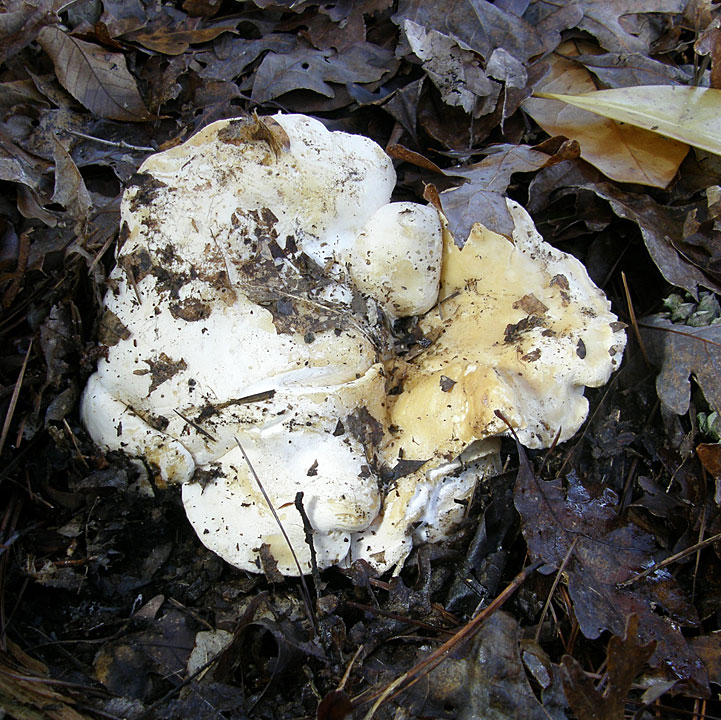

Scientific classification
- Domain: Eukaryota
- Kingdom: Fungi
- Division: Basidiomycota
- Class: Agaricomycetes
- Order: Cantharellales
- Family: Hydnaceae
- Genus: Hydnum
- Species: H. albomagnum

Binomial name
- Hydnum albomagnum Banker

= Hydnum albomagnum =

Species of fungus

Hydnum albomagnum, commonly known as the giant hedgehog, is a species of fungus in the family Hydnaceae native to North and Central America.
