= Phellodon fibulatus =

Scientific classification
- Domain: Eukaryota
- Kingdom: Fungi
- Division: Basidiomycota
- Class: Agaricomycetes
- Order: Thelephorales
- Family: Bankeraceae
- Genus: Phellodon
- Species: P. fibulatus

Binomial name
- Phellodon fibulatus K.A.Harrison (1972)

Species of fungus

Phellodon fibulatus is a species of tooth fungus in the family Bankeraceae. Found in the United States, the fungus was described as new to science in 1972 by Canadian mycologist Kenneth A. Harrison. It is one of the few species of Phellodon that possess clamp connections in its hyphae.
