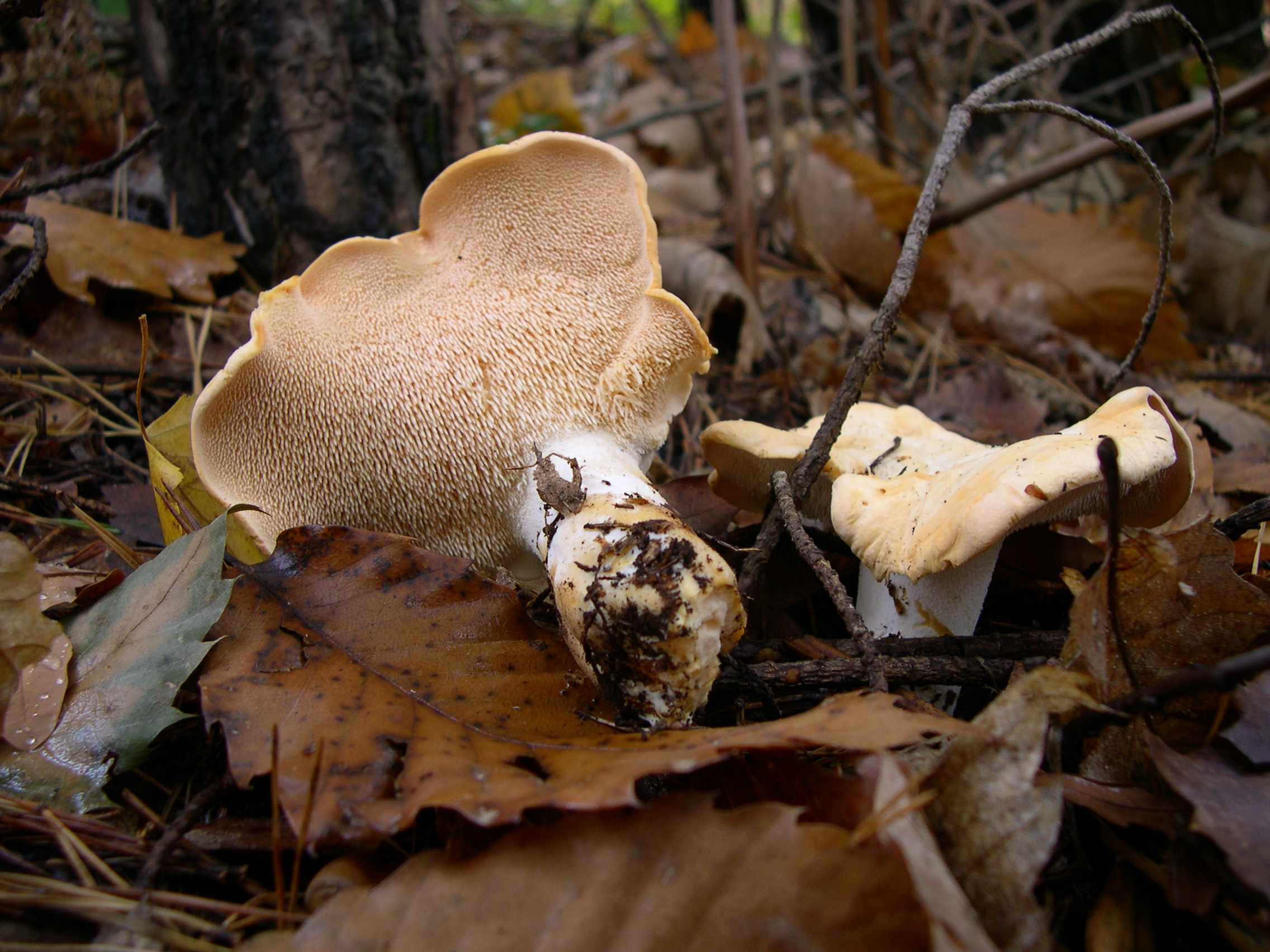
- Hydnum repandum

Scientific classification
- Kingdom: Fungi
- Division: Basidiomycota
- Class: Agaricomycetes
- Order: Cantharellales
- Family: Hydnaceae
- Genus: Hydnum; L. (1753)

Type species
- Hydnum repandum L. (1753)

Synonyms
- Erinaceus Dill. (1719); Bidona Adans. (1763); Bidonia Adans. (1763); Echinus Haller (1768); Hypothele Paulet (1808); Dentinum Gray (1821); Erinaceus Dill. ex Maratti (1822); Tyrodon P.Karst. (1881)

= Hydnum =

Genus of fungi

Hydnum is a genus of fungi in the family Hydnaceae. They are notable for their unusual spore-bearing structures of teeth rather than gills. The best known are the edible species Hydnum repandum and H. rufescens. There are no known toxic varieties of Hydnum. Widely regarded as important maintainers of forest ecosystems, the Hydnum genus is known to have ectomycorrhizal relationships with multiple plant families. Hydnum has many brittle, white teeth from which the spores drop. Some species have teeth which hang from ascending branches, while other species have teeth which project downwards from the undersurfaces of dead wood. Most Hydnum species are safe to eat, and contain many fatty acids and antioxidants.

== Taxonomy and diversity ==
Hydnum species are found on every continent that is habitable for plant life, with some preferring deep forest regions. Most of the common species, such as H. repandum and H. rufescens can be located in Europe, East Asia, and Australia.

Hydnum repandum is a common and edible species. Also called the "hedgehog mushroom", H. repandum is most often found in Europe, Mexico, and North America. The smooth cap grows as wide as 8 inches across, and the stem is off-center and is less than 2 inches long. H. repandum is often confused in looks for its similar tasting cousin, the Chantrelle mushroom. Medicinally, H. repandum has shown promising signs in preventing malignant sarcomas in mice.

Hydnum rufescens is another common edible variety of hydnum. Known locally as the terracotta hedgehog mushroom, it can be found in Portugal. It has been found to contain high levels of fatty acids and nutrients essential to the human diet.

Hydnum minum is a new species that was described in 2015. First located in Japan, H. minum is identifiable by a "whitish basidiomata", or spore-producing structure.

Hydnum vesterholtii has been newly found in calcium rich areas of the Mediterranean, as well as in the Pyrenees and Italy, and is recognized by an ochre tinted spore cap.

Hydnum ovoideisporum, much like H. vesterholtii, has an orangish colored cap. It is also found in the Iberian-Mediterranean climate and is fond of calcium rich soils.

== Species ==
Image	Scientific name	Taxon author	Year
	Hydnum aerostatisporum	Buyck, D.P. Lewis & V. Hofst.	2017
	Hydnum albertense	Niskanen & Liimat.	2018
	Hydnum albidum	Peck	1887
	Hydnum alboaurantiacum	Swenie & Matheny	2018
	Hydnum albomagnum	Banker	1901
	Hydnum ambustum	Cooke & Massee	1887
	Hydnum arachnoideofarinosum	Rick	1959
	Hydnum berkeleyanum	K. Das, Hembrom, A. Baghela & Vizzini	2018
	Hydnum boreorepandum	Niskanen, Liimat. & Niemelä	2018
	Hydnum brevispinum	T. Cao & H.S. Yuan	2021
	Hydnum brunnescens	Velen.	1922
	Hydnum canadense	Niskanen & Liimat.	2018
	Hydnum combinans	Peck	1901
	Hydnum commutatum	(Bourdot & Galzin) Pouzar	1956
	Hydnum cremeoalbum	Liimat. & Niskanen	2018
	Hydnum cuspidatum	Swenie & Matheny	2018
	Hydnum dispersum	Berk.	1845
	Hydnum durieui	Sacc.	1888
	Hydnum eichelbaumii	Henn.	1905
	Hydnum elatum	Massee	1914
	Hydnum ellipsosporum	Ostrow & Beenken	2004
	Hydnum ferruginescens	Swenie & Matheny	2018
	Hydnum flabellatum	T. Cao & H.S. Yuan	2021
	Hydnum flavidocanum	T. Cao & H.S. Yuan	2021
	Hydnum geminum	Swenie & Matheny	2018
	Hydnum heimii	Maas Geest.	1959
	Hydnum humidum	Banker	1902
	Hydnum ibericum	Olariaga, Liimat. & Niskanen	2018
	Hydnum indurescens	D. Hall & D.E. Stuntz	1972
	Hydnum inopinatum	(Donk) Pouzar	1956
	Hydnum jussii	Niskanen, Liimat. & Kytöv	2018
	Hydnum longibasidium	T. Cao & H.S. Yuan	2021
	Hydnum magnorufescens	Vizzini, Picillo & Contu	2013
	Hydnum mcnabbianum	J.A. Cooper	2023
	Hydnum melitosarx	Ruots., Huhtinen, Olariaga, Niskanen, Liimat. & Ammirati	2018
	Hydnum melleopallidum	Kranab., Liimat. & Niskanen	2018
	Hydnum minus	Yanaga & N. Maek.	2015
	Hydnum modestum	Snell & E.A. Dick	1962
	Hydnum molluscum	Fr.	1849
	Hydnum mulsicolor	Liimat. & Niskanen	2018
	Hydnum neorepandum	Niskanen & Liimat.	2018
	Hydnum olympicum	Niskanen, Liimat. & Ammirati	2018
	Hydnum oregonense	Norvell, Liimat. & Niskanen	2018
	Hydnum ovoideisporum	Olariaga, Grebenc, Salcedo & M.P. Martín	2012
	Hydnum pallidocroceum	T. Cao & H.S. Yuan	2021
	Hydnum pallidomarginatum	T. Cao & H.S. Yuan	2021
	Hydnum papyraceum	Wulfen	1787
	Hydnum politum	Fr.	1836
	Hydnum quebecense	Niskanen & Liimat.	2018
	Hydnum reginae	Kibby, Liimat. & Niskanen	2022
	Hydnum repando-orientale	Liimat. & Niskanen	2018
	Hydnum repandum	L.	1753
	Hydnum rufescens	Pers.	1800
	Hydnum salmoneum	R. Heim	1966
	Hydnum slovenicum	Liimat. & Niskanen	2018
	Hydnum sphaericum	T. Cao & H.S. Yuan	2021
	Hydnum spongiosum	Rick	1906
	Hydnum subconnatum	Swenie & Matheny	2018
	Hydnum subcremeoalbum	Tedersoo, Liimat. & Niskanen	2018
	Hydnum subincarnatum	K.A. Harrison	1964
	Hydnum subisidioides	Rick	1959
	Hydnum submelleum	Rick	1959
	Hydnum submulsicolor	Niskanen & Liimat.	2018
	Hydnum subolympicum	Liimat., Niskanen, R.E. Baird & Voitk	2018
	Hydnum subovoideisporum	Niskanen & Liimat.	2018
	Hydnum subpallidum	Snell & E.A. Dick	1962
	Hydnum subrufescens	Niskanen & Liimat.	2018
	Hydnum subtilior	Swenie & Matheny	2018
	Hydnum tangerinum	T. Cao & H.S. Yuan	2021
	Hydnum tenuidens	Rick	1959
	Hydnum tenuistipitum	T. Cao & H.S. Yuan	2021
	Hydnum treui	Tedersoo, Liimat. & Niskanen	2018
	Hydnum umbilicatum	Peck	1902
	Hydnum vagabundum	Swenie, Ovrebo & Matheny	2018
	Hydnum ventricosum	T. Cao & H.S. Yuan	2021
	Hydnum vesterholtii	Olariaga, Grebenc, Salcedo & M.P. Martín	2012
	Hydnum zongolicense	Garibay	2018
