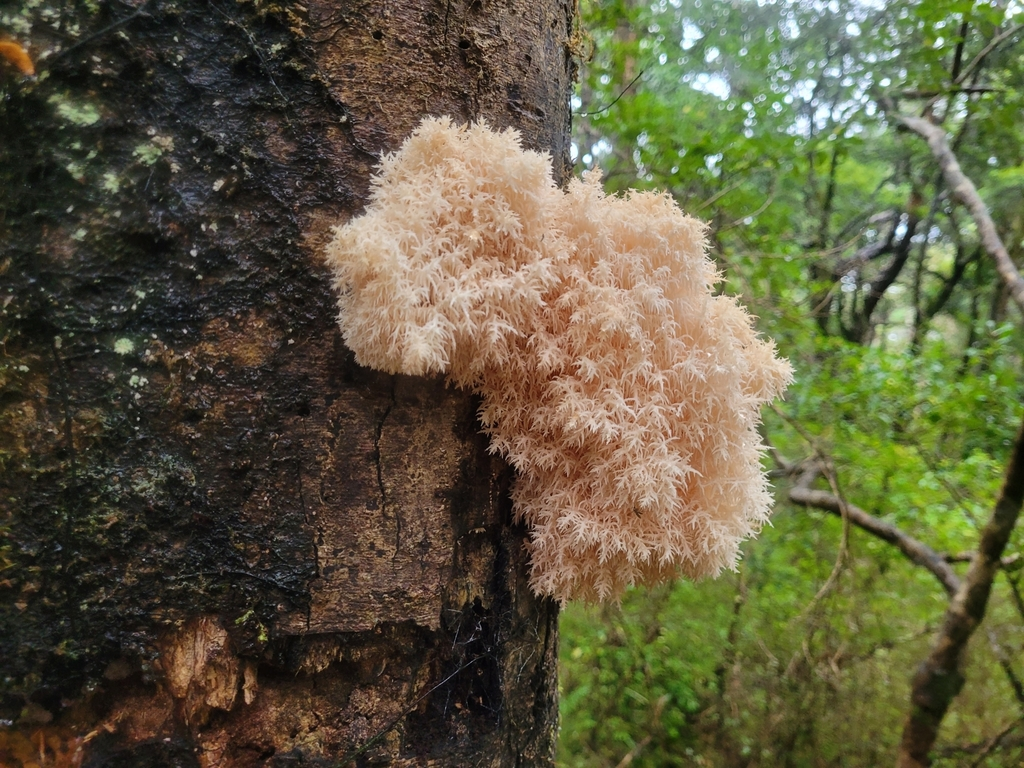
- Large Hericium novae-zealandiae approaching maturity, with no colour differentiation between stipes and hymenium.

Scientific classification
- Kingdom: Fungi
- Division: Basidiomycota
- Class: Agaricomycetes
- Order: Russulales
- Family: Hericiaceae
- Genus: Hericium
- Species: H. novae-zealandiae

Binomial name
- Hericium novae-zealandiae (Colenso) Chr. A. Sm. & J.A.

Synonyms
- Hydnum novae-zealandiae

= Hericium novae-zealandiae =

Species of fungus

Hericium novae-zealandiae is a species of fungus in the Hericiaceae family. Formerly classified as Hericium coralloides which shares an almost identical morphology. Being saprotrophic, H. novae-zealandiae can be observed growing from dead, decaying wood. Also known as pekepekekiore, it is endemic to New Zealand and was consumed by indigenous Māori.

== Description ==
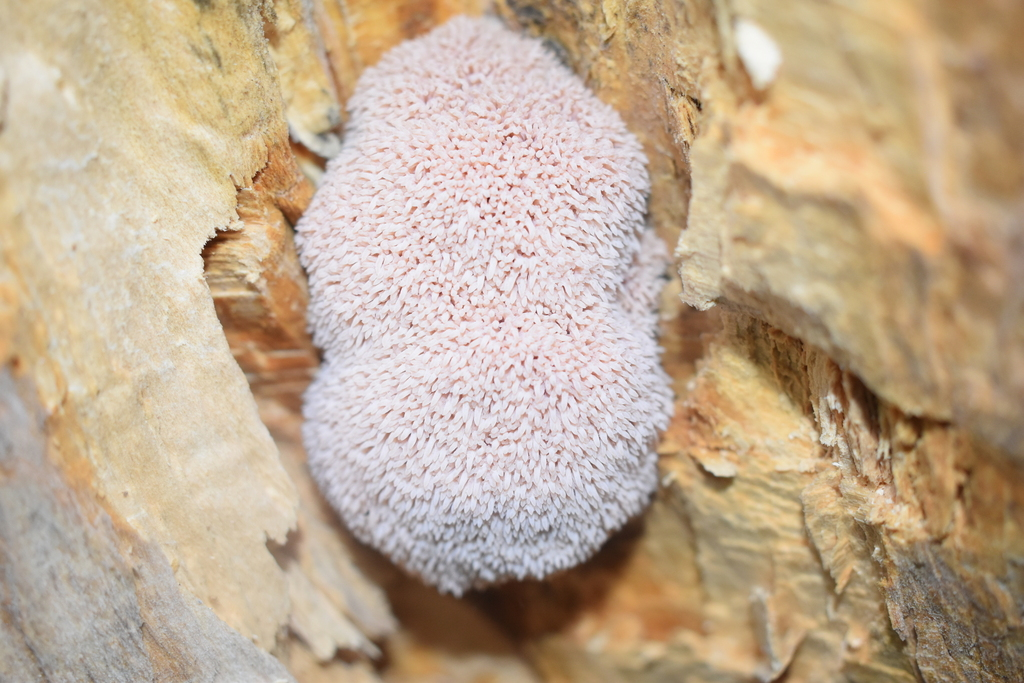
Very immature fruiting body of Hericium novae-zealandiae, a small solid mass packed with teeth (which will grow and become branched).

Hericium novae-zealandiae has a relatively large (10 cm + diameter), white fruiting body, initially described (as Hydnum nova zealandia) as looking somewhat like a cauliflower nearing flowering. Lacking a pileus or defined stipe, basidiomata are highly and irregularly branched. Growing from a short, corkish stem, culminating in numerous, densely arranged, fine tips. The hymenium (spore bearing surface) is located on the surface of the fine tips, there is no delineation between the stipe and the hymenium until spore maturity when tips become reddish.

== Medicinal ==
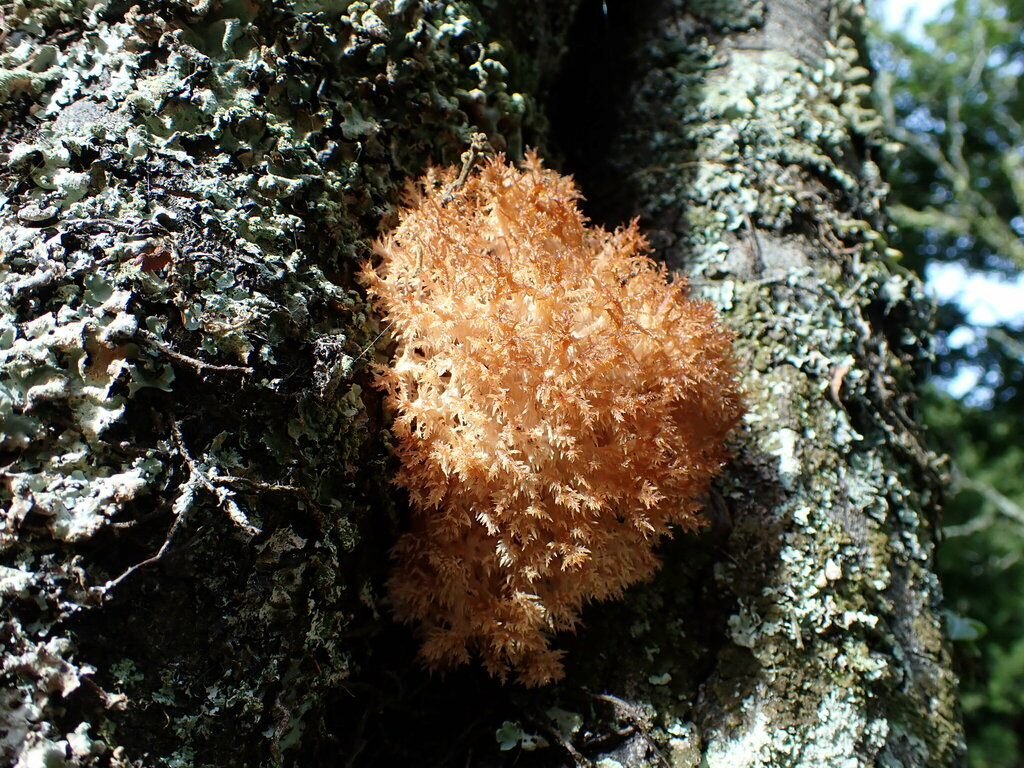
Hericium novae-zealandiae growing from a dead tree trunk among lichens. Hymenium has matured and become reddish.

The closely related Hericium erinaceus, or lion's mane has been shown to have numerous health benefits including treating dyspepsia, gastric ulcers as well as antitumor and immuno-modulatory activity.

Extractions from Hericium novae-zealandiae have been shown to exhibit antiproliferative qualities when applied to three prostate cancer lines cancer lines (DU145, LNCaP and PC3). While a polysacharride extract was effective on LNCaP and PC3 lines, an ethanol extract containing the constituents hericenone C, hericene B, ergosterol and ergosterol peroxide was effective on all three. The mechanism in both cases was identified as apoptosis (programmed cell death).
