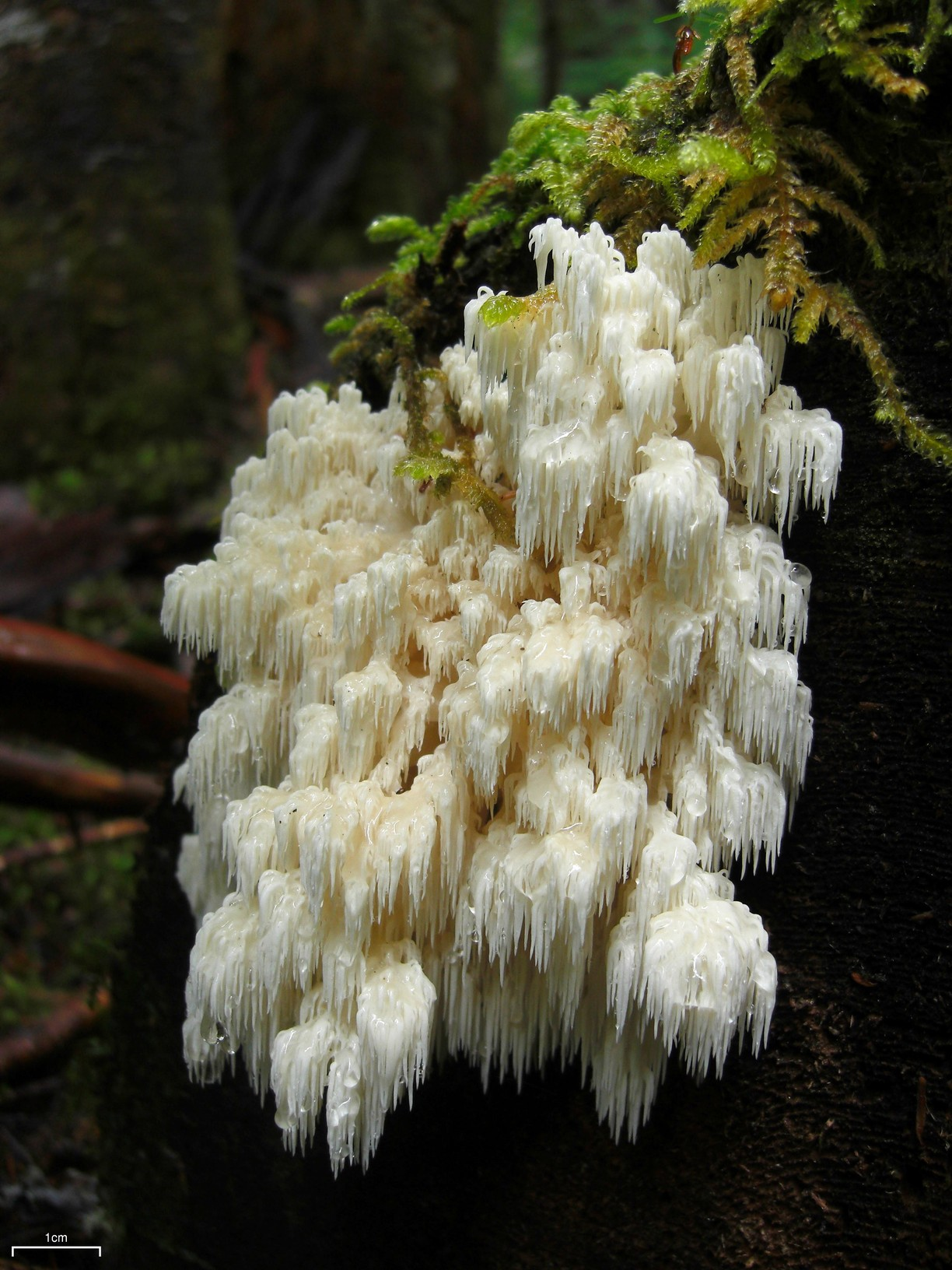

Scientific classification
- Kingdom: Fungi
- Division: Basidiomycota
- Class: Agaricomycetes
- Order: Russulales
- Family: Hericiaceae
- Genus: Hericium
- Species: H. abietis

Binomial name
- Hericium abietis (Weir ex Hubert) K.A.Harrison (1964)

Synonyms
- Hydnum abietis Weir ex Hubert (1931)

= Hericium abietis =

Hericium abietis
- Mycological characteristics
- Teeth on hymenium
- No distinct cap
- Lacks a stipe
- Spore print is white
- Ecology is parasitic
- Edibility is choice

Hericium abietis, commonly known as the conifer coral hericium, bear's head, or western coral hedgehog, is a species of tooth fungus. It produces a cream white fruit body up to 10–75 cm (4–30 in) tall and wide.

The mushroom grows on conifer stumps or logs in North America, fruiting from after the start of the fall rains to mid-season. It is edible.

== Taxonomy ==
The species was first described as Hydnum abietis by American botanist James Robert Weir in 1931. Weir collected the type specimens in 1916, near the Priest River in Idaho. Kenneth Archibald Harrison transferred it to the genus Hericium in 1964. The mushroom is commonly known as the "bear's head" or the "western coral hedgehog".

== Description ==
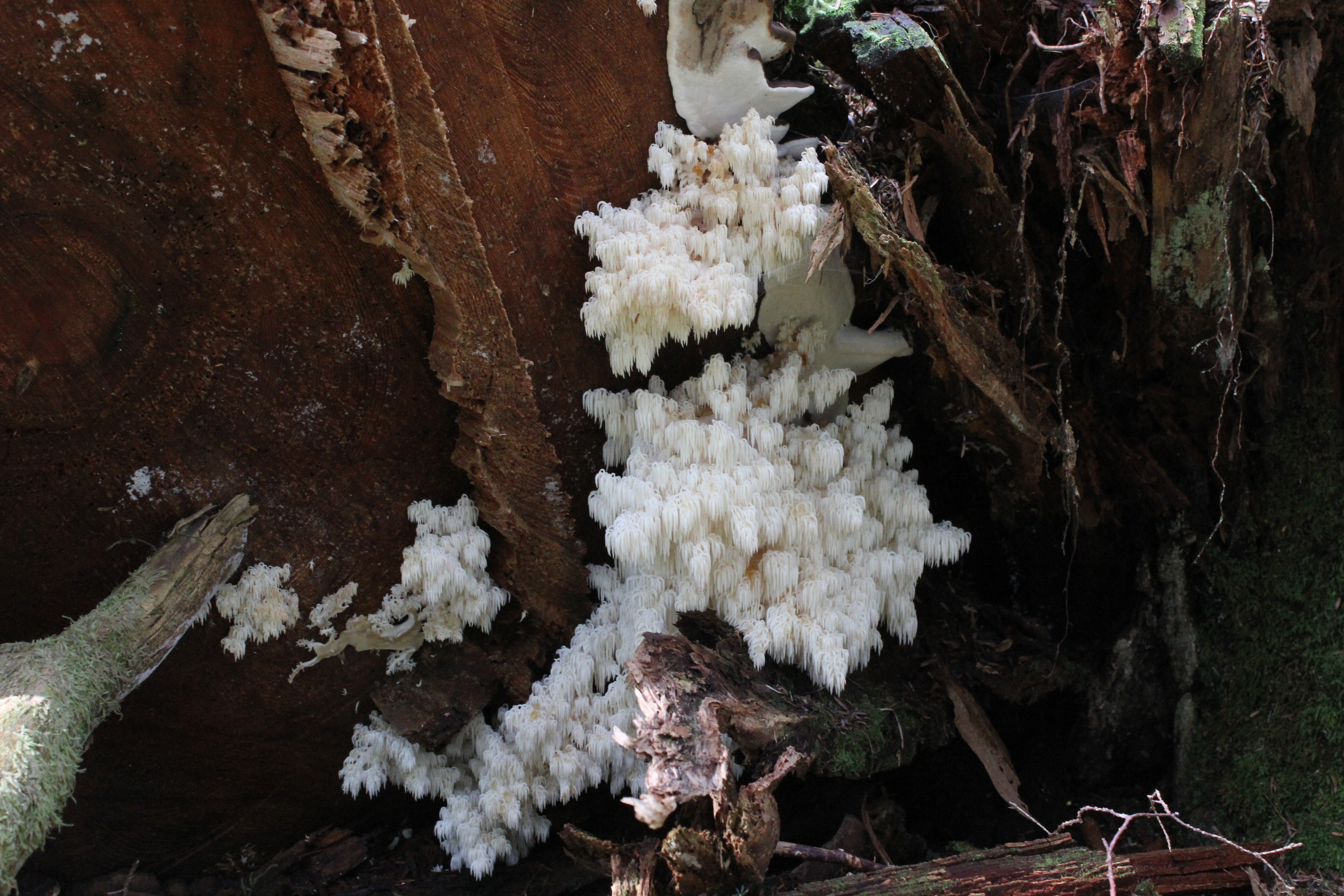
Hericium abietis mushroom growing on a log in Northwestern British Columbia. Note, there is also a bracket mushroom growing in the background on the same log.

The fruit body comprises a compact, branched mass originating from a thick, tough base with long spines hanging down. Its color ranges from white to creamy, light yellowish, to salmon-buff. The hanging spines are usually 0.5–1 cm (1/4–3/8 in) long, although some may be as long as 2.5 cm (1 in); they are soft and brittle and typically grow as clusters at the tips of the branches. The fruit bodies are typically 10 to 75 cm (4 to 30 in) wide and tall, but can attain massive sizes; one noted specimen was about 100 pounds (45 kg).

Hericium abietis produces a white spore print. The spores are spherical or nearly so, smooth to slightly roughened, amyloid, and measure 4.5–5.5 by 4–5 μm. The hyphae are monomitic (consisting of only generative hyphae), and they have clamp connections.

=== Similar species ===
Hericium erinaceus is a lookalike spine fungus. It can be distinguished by its more compact fruit body structure that lacks multiple branches, in which the hanging spines all originate from a single thick tubercle. In Hericium coralloides, the spines line the undersides of the branches, unlike H. abietis, whose spines are arranged in clusters at the tip of branches.

=== Uses ===
Hericium abietis is edible and choice. David Arora suggests that cooking the mushroom produces a flavor similar to fish and that it is suitable for sauteing, marinating, or preparing as a curry dish.

== Habitat and distribution ==
Hericium abietis causes a white rot of conifers; this is a form of wood decay featuring a selective attack on lignin and hemicellulose in wood. The fruit bodies grow singly or occasionally in small groups on the dead wood of conifers, especially Douglas-fir. It can also be cultivated on conifer sawdust or logs. The species is found throughout North America.
