= Fungus of the Year in Latvia =

Fungus of the Year in Latvia (Latvian: Gada sēne Latvijā) is an annual nomination of fungal species of the Latvian fungal diversity. The selection of the species is supervised by the Latvian Mycological Society [lv], that conducts the selection of the Lichen of the Year as well.

The official webpage of the Latvian Mycological Society states that: "[the fungus] may earn such honors for various reasons: [for being] particularly rare, new to this country, exceptionally beautiful or strange-looking, highly poisonous or destructive, or, to the contrary, fairly protective." Generally, the fungal and lichen species, and selected species of other categories are being highlighted to the public to promote any kind of awereness towards them or their biotopes. In 2022, two similar species have been seected, instead of a singular pick.

The fungus category has been present since 2003, and the lichen category was added in 2008 and has been announced only thrice since then – last time, after a 15-year break, in 2026.

== Selected fungal species by the year ==
- 2003 – Fluted white elfin saddle (Helvella crispa)
- 2004 – Reishi (Ganoderma lucidum)
- 2005 – Alaskan gold (Phaeolepiota aurea)
- 2006 – Witches cauldron (Sarcosoma globosum)
- 2007 – Giant leucopax (Aspropaxillus giganteus (Leucopaxillus giganteus))
- 2008 – Torq (Agaricus bitorquis)
- 2009 – Heterobasidion annosum
- 2010 – Hericium clathroides
- 2011 – Death cap (Amanita phalloides)
- 2012 – Netted rhodotus (Rhodotus palmatus)
- 2013 – Serpula lacrymans
- 2014 – Aureoboletus projectellus (Boletus projectellus)
- 2015 – Phlebiopsis gigantea
- 2016 – Warted amanita (Amanita strobiliformis)
- 2017 – Choiromyces meandriformis
- 2018 – Giant puffball (Calvatia gigantea)
- 2019 – Sarcodontia crocea
- 2020 – Peziza ammophila
- 2021 – Blackening waxcap (Hygrocybe conica)
- 2022 – Hydnellum genus members: bleeding tooth fungus (Hydnellum peckii) and mealy tooth (Hydnellum ferrugineum)
- 2023 – Hen-of-the-woods (Grifola frondosa)
- 2024 – Green elfcup (Chlorociboria aeruginascens)
- 2025 – Parrot toadstool (Gliophorus psittacinus)
- 2026 – Amethyst deceiver (Laccaria amethystina)

== Selected lichen species by the year ==
- 2008 – Star-tipped cup lichen (Cladina stellaris)
- 2010 – Green dog lichen (Peltigera aphthosa)
- 2026 – Yellow wall lichen (Xanthoria pariethina)
