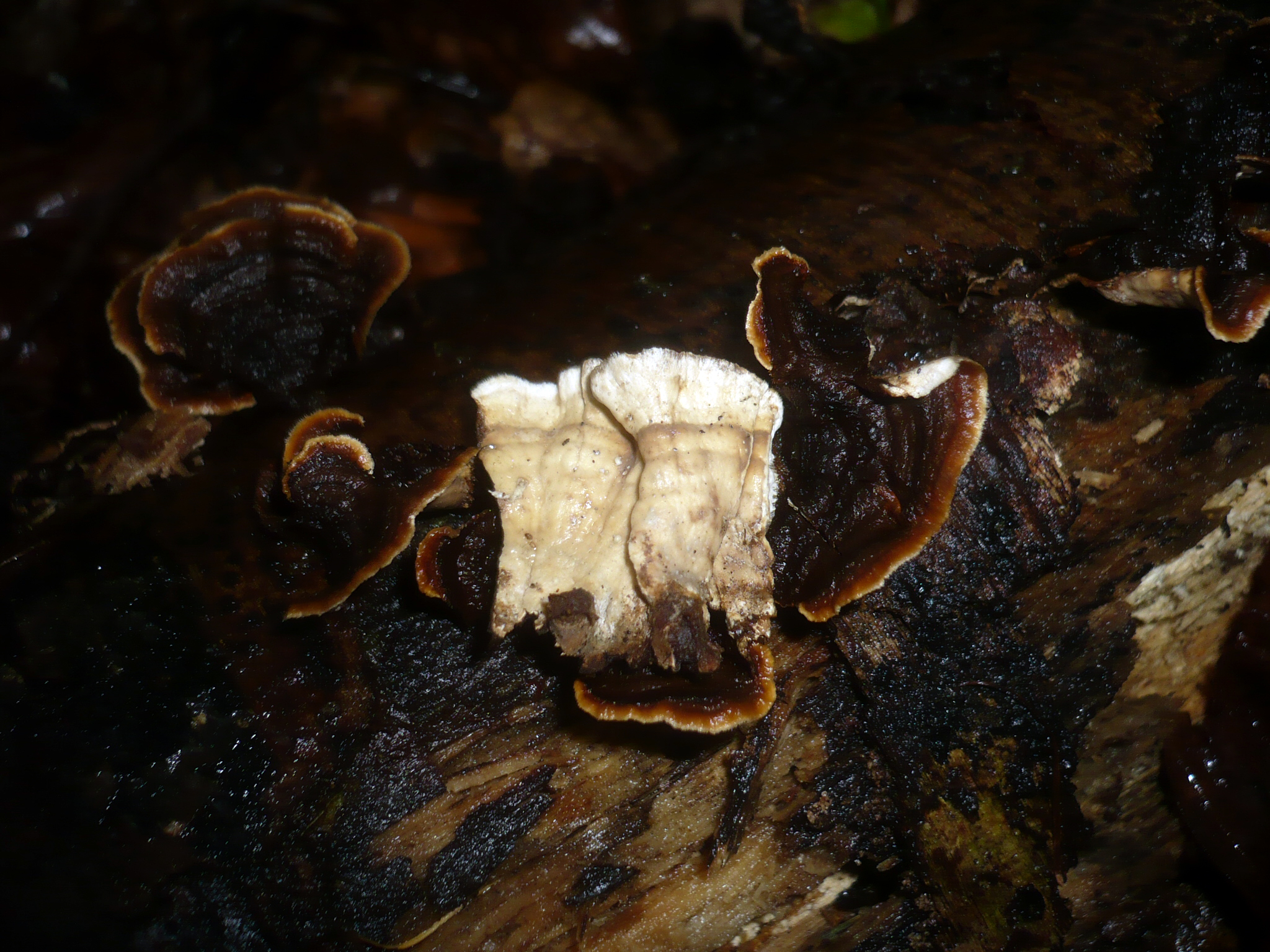
- Laxitextum bicolor

Scientific classification
- Domain: Eukaryota
- Kingdom: Fungi
- Division: Basidiomycota
- Class: Agaricomycetes
- Order: Russulales
- Family: Hericiaceae
- Genus: Laxitextum; Lentz (1956)

Type species
- Laxitextum bicolor (Pers.) Lentz (1956)

Species
- L. bicolor; L. incrustatum; L. lutescens

= Laxitextum =

Genus of fungi

Laxitextum is a genus of fungi in the family Hericiaceae. The widespread genus contains three species. It was circumscribed by Paul Lewis Lentz in 1955. Species in the genus have fruit bodies that are effused (stretched out flat) to reflexed (with edges turned up) and a smooth hymenium. Molecular analysis shows that the genus groups in a clade with the genera Hericium and Dentipellis.

== Species ==
Image	Scientific name	Distribution
	Laxitextum bicolor	North America
	Laxitextum incrustatum	Kenya, Tanzania
	Laxitextum lutescens	tropical Africa
