= Hericium rajchenbergii =

Scientific classification
- Domain: Eukaryota
- Kingdom: Fungi
- Division: Basidiomycota
- Class: Agaricomycetes
- Order: Russulales
- Family: Hericiaceae
- Genus: Hericium
- Species: H. rajchenbergii

Binomial name
- Hericium rajchenbergii Robledo & Hallenb., 2012

Species of fungus

Hericium rajchenbergii is a species of fungus in the family Hericiaceae native to Argentina, first described by Gerardo Robledo & Nils Hallenberg in 2012. It grows on dead stems of Lithraea molleoides in the forests of Chaco Serrano. The fruitbodies resemble those of Hericium coralloides, and H. rajchenbergii can be recognized from them by different substrate and slightly bigger spores.
