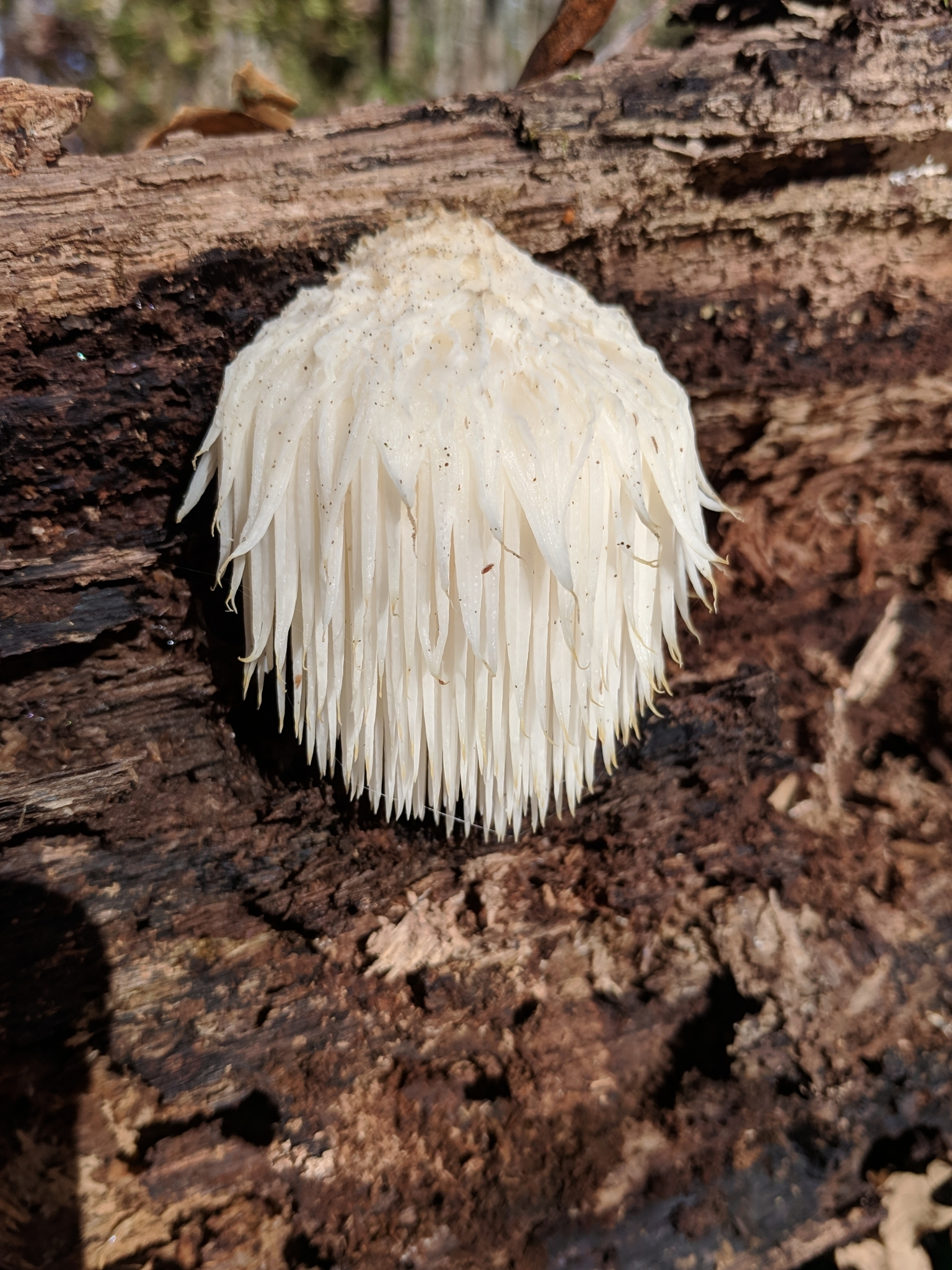
- Specimen on fallen log

Scientific classification
- Kingdom: Fungi
- Division: Basidiomycota
- Class: Agaricomycetes
- Order: Russulales
- Family: Hericiaceae
- Genus: Hericium
- Species: H. erinaceus

Binomial name
- Hericium erinaceus (Bull.) Persoon (1797)

Synonyms
- Hydnum erinaceus Bull. (1781); Clavaria erinaceus; Dryodon erinaceus

= Hericium erinaceus =

Edible mushroom

Hericium erinaceus
- Mycological characteristics
- Teeth on hymenium
- No distinct cap
- Hymenium attachment is not applicable
- Lacks a stipe
- Spore print is white
- Ecology is saprotrophic
- Edibility is choice

Hericium erinaceus, commonly known as lion's mane, yamabushitake, bearded tooth fungus, or bearded hedgehog, is a species of tooth fungus. It tends to grow in a single clump with dangling spines longer than 1 centimetre (1/2 inch). It can be mistaken for other Hericium species that grow in the same areas.

Native to North America and Eurasia, the mushrooms are common during late summer and autumn on hardwoods, particularly American beech and maple. It is typically considered saprophytic, as it mostly feeds on dead trees. It can also be found on living trees, usually in association with a wound.

It is an edible mushroom and used in traditional Chinese medicine. It is generally safe to eat, but its medicinal effectiveness, safety in supplements, and active compounds are unproven.

== Etymology ==
Both the Latin genus name Hericium and the species name erinaceus mean 'hedgehog' in Latin. This is also reflected by the German name, Igel-Stachelbart (literally, hedgehog-goatee), and some of its common English names, such as bearded hedgehog and hedgehog mushroom. It is known in Japan as yamabushitake (Kanji: 山伏茸, Katakana: ヤマブシタケ) in reference to the yamabushi or mountain ascetics of the syncretistic religion known as Shugendo; while in Chinese, it is known as hóutóugū (simplified Chinese: 猴头菇; traditional Chinese: 猴頭菇; Jyutping: hau4 tou4 gu1) meaning "monkey-head mushroom", in Korea as noru gungdeng-i beoseot (노루궁뎅이버섯) meaning "deer butt mushroom", and in Europe and North America as lion's mane.

== Description ==
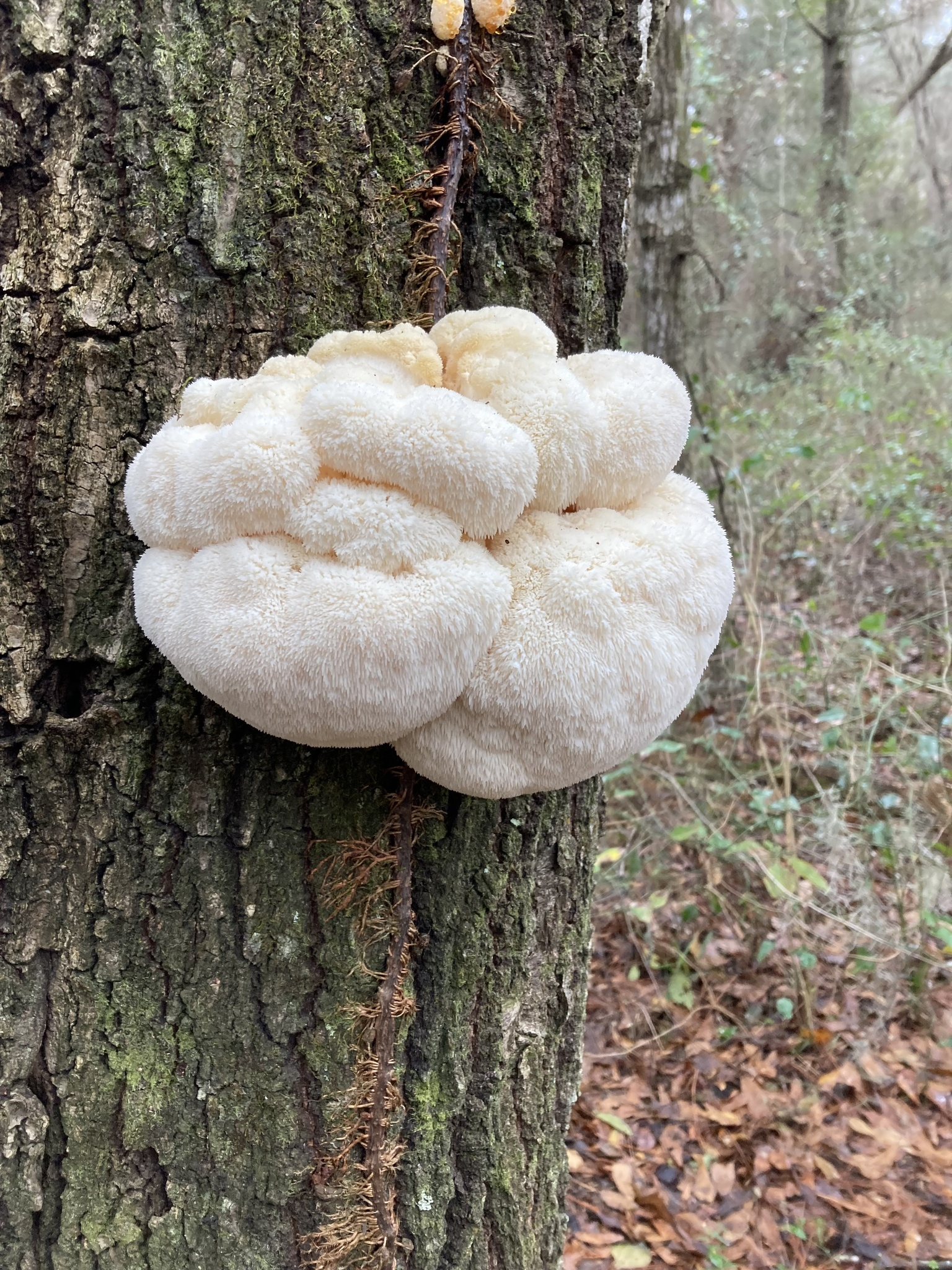
Specimen on living tree

The fruit bodies of H. erinaceus are large, irregular bulbous tubercules. They are 5–40 centimetres (2–15 1/2 inches) in diameter and dominated by crowded, hanging, spore-producing spines, which are 1–5 cm (1/2–2 in) long or longer.

The hyphal system is monomitic, amyloid, and composed of thin- to thick-walled hyphae that are approximately 3–15 μm (microns) wide. The hyphae also contain clamped septa and gloeoplerous elements (filled with oily, resinous substances), which can come into the hymenium as gloeocystidia.

The basidia of H. erinaceus, are 25–40μm long and 5–7μm wide, each containing four spores that possess a basal clamp. The white amyloid spores measure approximately 5–7μm in length and 4–5μm in width. The spore shape is described as subglobose, a rough imperfect sphere, compared to the short ellipsoid, which is smoother and finely roughened.

=== Development ===
It has been observed that H. erinaceus can fruit intermittently for 20 years on the same dead tree. It is hypothesized that H. erinaceus can survive for 40 years. The mating system of H. erinaceus species found in the U.S. was shown to be bifactorially heterothallic.

The monokaryotic mycelium growth of H. erinaceus is slower than dikaryotic growth and only a relatively low percentage of monokaryotic cultures yield fruit bodies. Monokaryotic fruit bodies are also smaller than dikaryotic fruit bodies. The monokaryotic mycelium was found to produce fusoid to subglobose chlamydospores of 6–8 x 8–10 μm size. These spores can stay viable for more than seven years and be stored under anaerobic conditions. Chlamydospore germination requires 30 to 52 hours, with a germination success rate of 32 to 54%.

Spore production is highest at midday, relative to temperature increase and a decrease of relative humidity. Daily trends toward lower relative humidity can favor sporulation, however, levels of relative humidity that are too low do not favor high total spore production.

=== Mycochemistry ===
H. erinaceus contains diverse chemicals, including polysaccharides, such as β-glucan, as well as hericenones and erinacines. From its essential oil, 77 aroma and flavor compounds were identified, including hexadecanoic acid (26% of total oil composition), linoleic acid (13%), phenylacetaldehyde (9%) and benzaldehyde (3%), and other oils, such as 2-methyl-3-furanthiol, 2-ethylpyrazine and 2,6-diethylpyrazine. Low concentrations of ergosterol are present.

=== Similar species ===
Similar species in the genus include H. americanum and H. coralloides, both found in eastern North America. Additional species with a resemblance include Donkia pulcherrima, Radulomyces copelandii and some within Sarcodontia.

== Distribution and habitat ==
A specimen on the North American west coast in December

In Europe, the fruit bodies of H. erinaceus are mainly produced annually from August to November. In North America, they appear from October to February in the west, from July to October in the Mountain states, and from September to February in the east.

In the wild, lion's mane is usually associated with a tree wound and causes a white pocket rot. Decayed tissue becomes spongy and eventually disintegrates to form a cavity. The distinctive fruiting bodies (basidiocarps) generally appear near the edges of old wounds in autumn. It has been described as a symbiotic associate of host trees, possibly occupying an endophytic habitat.

H. erinaceus hosts in North America include maple, ash, oaks, and eucalyptus. In California, lion's mane has been found on coast live oak, canyon live oak, interior live oak, California black oak, blue oak, and valley oak.

Lion's mane is able to withstand cold temperatures and frost conditions.

== Ecology ==
Hericium species are good competitors against other wood colonisers. They show the ability to maintain their place on dead wood, also when confronted with secondary colonizers, such as Trametes versicolor and Stereum hirsutum. Hericium erinaceus has shown to be slightly more competitive than other fungi tooth species, including Creolophus cirrhatus and H. coralloides.

Brennandania lambi (Acari: Pygmephoroidea) is a mite pest of fungi culture in China. This mite can develop and reproduce on the mycelium of H. erinaceus. Farm hygiene and heat treatments are the most important pest management strategies that should be followed to counter this acarus.

== Conservation ==
Although H. erinaceus is native to Europe, it has been red listed in several European countries due to poor germination and establishment.

== Cultivation ==
In fungi cultivation, fungal strains are analogous to plant varieties in crop breeding. Fungal strains comprise clonal descendants of a single isolation from one fungal colony in a pure culture. The production of H. erinaceus is widespread in Asia, mostly using extensive production practices on wood logs or stumps.

Although there is considerable scientific research about Hericium spp., they are not commonly industrially produced in the West. Accordingly, there are few commercially available strains in the U.S. or Europe and little or no breeding for higher yield or other favorable traits has occurred. Production trials in Egypt report yields of H. erinaceus averaging at 165 g per 1 kg medium.

In North America, its production occurs only on a small scale. Most of it is intensive indoor production with only a few small outdoor sites where log cultivation is practiced.

=== Substrate requirements ===
As a saprophyte that occurs on dead wood, H. erinaceus requires adequate substrate factors, including suitable carbon and nitrogen sources, a certain pH value and ideal carbon-to-nitrogen ratio.

Many different substrates have been used to successfully cultivate this mushroom. Depending on the type of cultivation, the substrate can be either solid (artificial log) or liquid (submerged culture and deep submerged culture).

The solid substrate is most commonly a mixture of sawdust of hardwood or conifer containing different complements that may include wheat bran, wheat straw, soybean meal, corn meal, rice bran, and rice straw. For example, H. erinaceus strains grow on beech sawdust substrate enriched with wheat bran (20%), rye grain (25%), soybean meal (7%), rapeseed meal (10%), or meat-osseous flour (6%).

An example of a liquid substrate composition can be glucose for the carbon source, soybean powder, corn powder, and wheat bran powder as a complex nitrogen source. The pH values most suitable for the favorable growth of H. erinaceus were in the range of 5.0–9.0, with pH 6.0 as optimal.

=== Climate requirements ===
Hericium erinaceus requires a humid environment for its growth: 85 to 90% of relative humidity in the air. The incubation temperature most suitable for the mycelial growth of H. erinaceus was found to be 25 °C, and the optimum temperature for vegetative growth was 26 °C. H. erinaceus is unable to grow with a water potential lower than -5 Mpa.

=== Techniques ===
The artificial cultivation of H. erinaceus was first reported in China in 1988. It is cultivated using artificial logs, bottles, and polypropylene bags. However, this type of artificial cultivation is not suitable for industrialized production due to its low yield and long cultivation cycles.

Submerged culture is a type of artificial cultivation of H. erinaceus whereby the fungus is grown in a liquid medium. Using this method, a large number of mycelia can be obtained quickly. Bioactive compounds can be sourced from the fruiting bodies, submerged-cultivated mycelial biomass, or liquid-cultivated broth. Growers optimize the culture medium composition to obtain simultaneously high yields of H. erinaceus mycelial biomass, exopolysaccharides, and polysaccharides. Submerged fermentation is preferable for the production of mycelial biomass and biologically active metabolites in order to produce a more uniform biomass and extract products.

Growth regulators, such as 2,4-Dichlorophenoxyacetic acid and gibberellin, were observed to have an advantageous effect on spore germination. Other technologies, such as red and green laser light of low intensity, stimulated spore germination as well as the vegetative growth of mycelium. Argon and helium lasers also contributed to the acceleration of fruit body development by 36–51%.

=== Wild strains ===
Wild strains of Hericium spp. are isolated and cultivated by first gathering fruiting bodies from fallen trees in the natural habitat. The fruiting bodies are opened to attain pieces of their inner spore-producing tissue. This tissue is placed onto Petri dishes with agar to cultivate fungal colonies at 25 °C. Several transfers to new Petri dishes are performed to verify the purity of the strain, then kept at −80 °C for long-term storage.

== Uses ==
=== Culinary ===
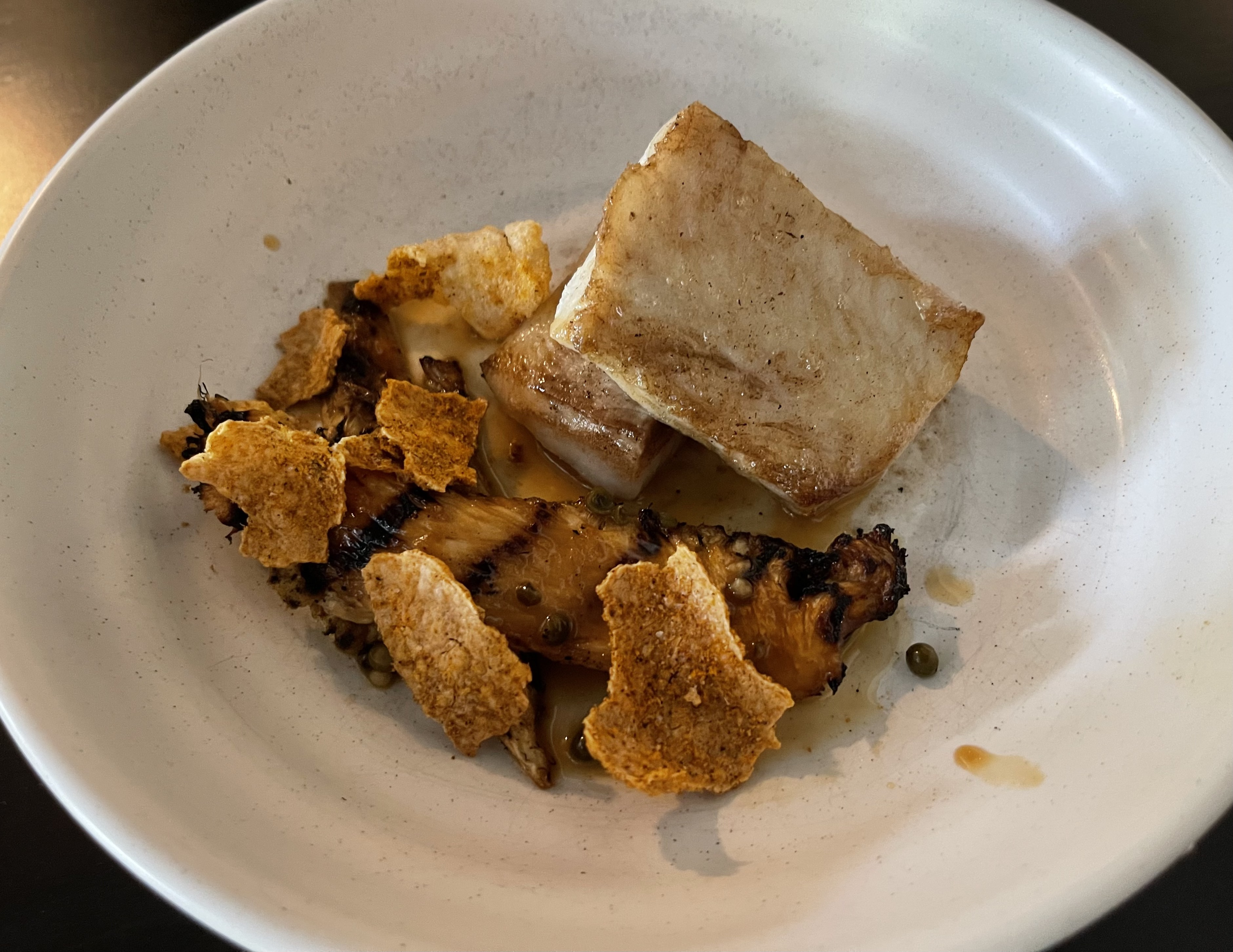
Rock cod with grilled H. erinaceus

The edible fruiting bodies are common in gourmet cooking, with young specimens considered the best. Alongside shiitake (Lentinus edodes) and oyster (Pleurotus ostreatus) mushrooms, H. erinaceus is used as a specialty mushroom in recipes.

H. erinaceus fruiting bodies contain 57% carbohydrates (8% as dietary fiber), 4% fat, and 22% protein.

H. erinaceus's "meaty" texture perception has led to its exploration as a potential meat alternative to steak, either by itself or in combination with soy-based meat analogues.

=== Traditional and contemporary uses ===
Used in traditional Chinese medicine for centuries, H. erinaceus is commonly marketed as a dietary supplement for its purported benefits to memory, but lacks sufficient scientific evidence for safety or effectiveness, and quality can vary due to inconsistent processing and labeling. Though it is a generally safe edible mushroom, its efficacy and specific active compounds remain unconfirmed in vivo.

Testing on mice in 2016 and 2020 indicated that an extract of H. erinaceus (or its polysaccharide-enriched mycelium) could have neuroprotective effects in PC12 cells.

== See also ==
- Medicinal fungi
