= Hericium yumthangense =

Scientific classification
- Domain: Eukaryota
- Kingdom: Fungi
- Division: Basidiomycota
- Class: Agaricomycetes
- Order: Russulales
- Family: Hericiaceae
- Genus: Hericium
- Species: H. yumthangense

Binomial name
- Hericium yumthangense K. Das, Stalpers & Stielow, 2013

Species of fungus

Hericium yumthangense is a species of fungus in the family Hericiaceae native to Sikkim in India, first described by K. Das, Stalpers & Stielow in 2013 based on specimens from Yumthang (hence the name). It can be distinguished from other Hericium by its small rooting base, intricate three-tier branching system, and its spines which are 8–13 millimetres (3/8–1/2 in) long.
