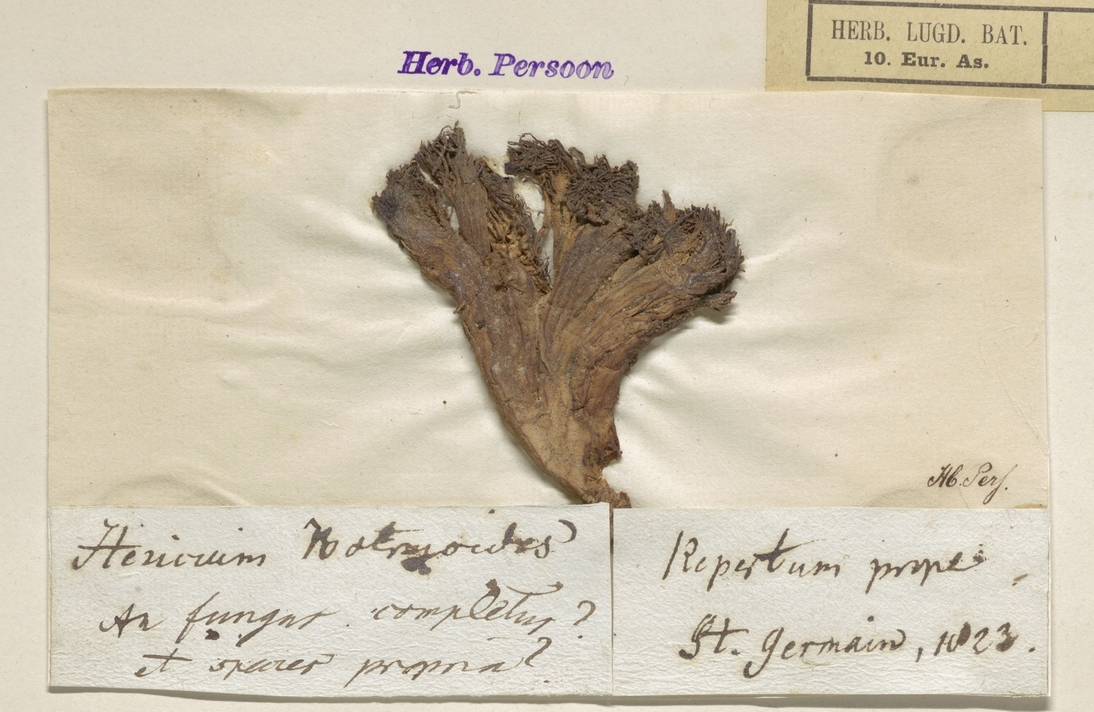

Scientific classification
- Kingdom: Fungi
- Division: Basidiomycota
- Class: Agaricomycetes
- Order: Russulales
- Family: Hericiaceae
- Genus: Hericium
- Species: H. botryoides

Binomial name
- Hericium botryoides S. Ito & Otani, 1957

= Hericium botryoides =

Species of fungus

Hericium botryoides is a species of fungus in the family Hericiaceae native to Japan, first described by Seiya Ito and Hironao Otani in 1957. It is found growing on Quercus myrsinifolia.
