= Hericium fimbrillatum =

Scientific classification
- Kingdom: Fungi
- Division: Basidiomycota
- Class: Agaricomycetes
- Order: Russulales
- Family: Hericiaceae
- Genus: Hericium
- Species: H. fimbrillatum

Binomial name
- Hericium fimbrillatum (Iwade) R. Sugaw., N. Maek. & N. Endo, 2022

Synonyms
- Hydnum fimbrillatum

Species of fungus

Hericium fimbrillatum is a species of fungus in the family Hericiaceae native to East Asia, given its current name by Ryo Sugawara, Nitaro Maekawa, Kozue Sotome, Akira Nakagiri, Naoki Endo in 2022, who transferred it from the Hydnum genus.
