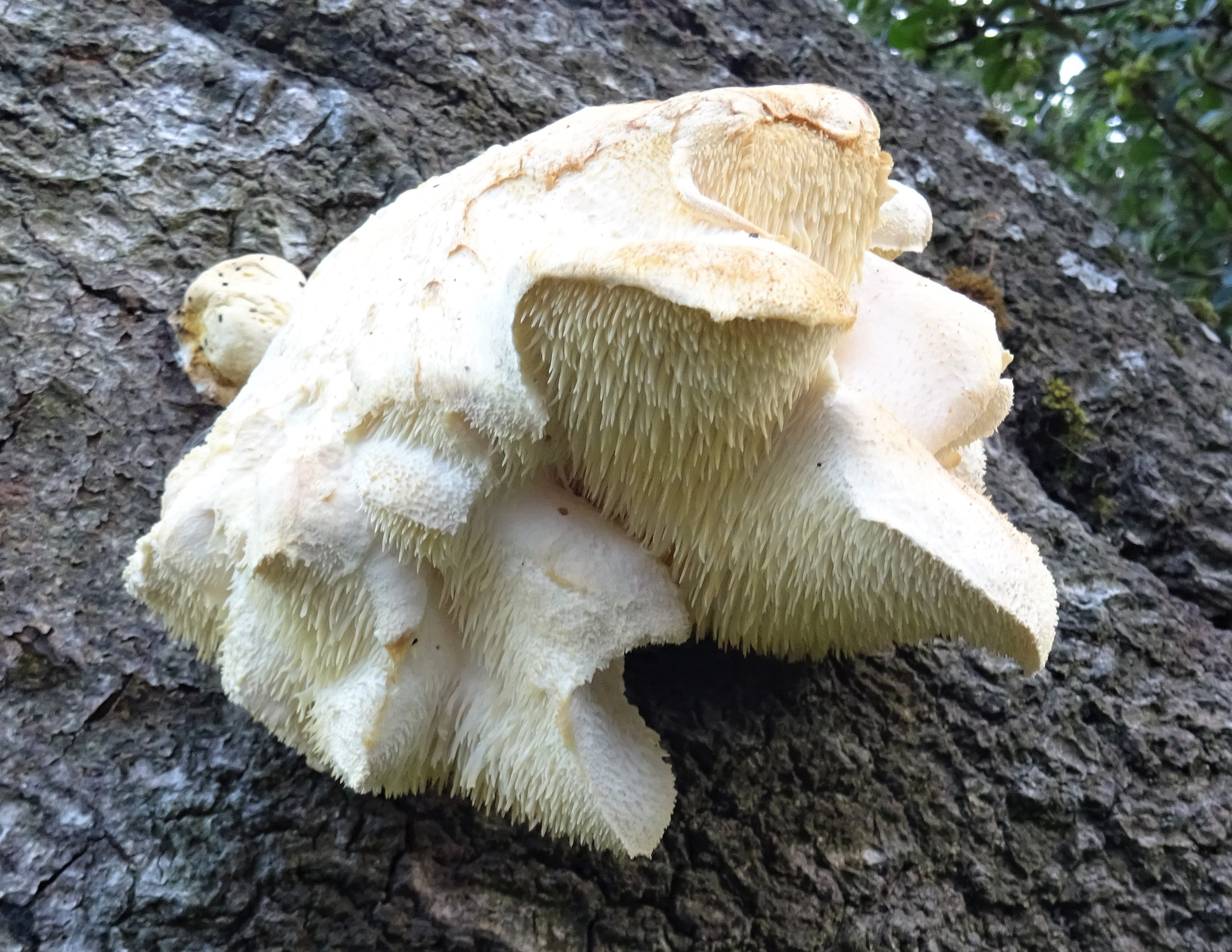

Scientific classification
- Kingdom: Fungi
- Division: Basidiomycota
- Class: Agaricomycetes
- Order: Russulales
- Family: Hericiaceae
- Genus: Hericium
- Species: H. cirrhatum

Binomial name
- Hericium cirrhatum (Nikol) Pers. (1950)

Synonyms
- Creolophus cirratus Scop. (1801); Hydnum diversidens Fr., (1821) *Creolophus cirrhatus (Pers.) P. Karst., (1879); Hericium diversidens (Fr.) Nikol. (1961) *Hydnum cirrhatum Pers. (1794)

= Hericium cirrhatum =

Species of fungus

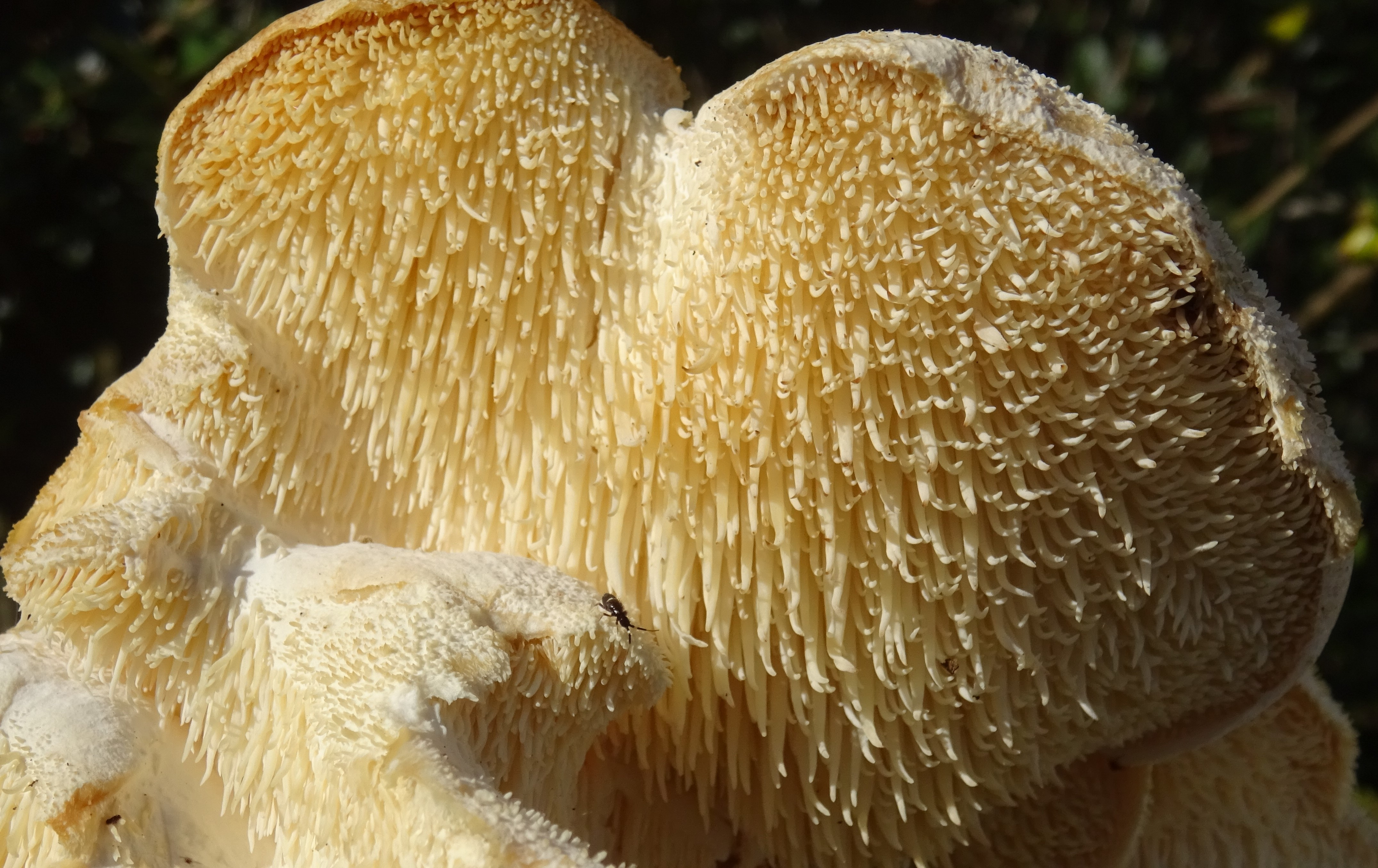
Details of spines on the fruiting body.

Hericium cirrhatum is a saprotrophic fungus, commonly known as the tiered tooth fungus or spine face. The species is edible and good eating when young. It has a texture not unlike tender meat or fish. The flesh is cream in colour with an attractive smell when young, but it develops a very unpleasant odour in older specimens.

== Appearance ==
The appearance of the fruit body is bracket-like, but without a stem and usually the spines are hang in tiers like icicles. The upper surface is often rough with sterile spines and scales present. DNA analysis places it in the order Russulales. Each tier can be 5 to 10cms across and 2 to 3cms thick with spines a little over 1cm long. It tends to occur for only a couple of years at any given site.

Hericium cirrhatum can be mistaken for Hydnum rufescens or Hydnum repandum, however these species have a cap that is smooth. Hericium erinaceus is another Red Data List species with a more obviously spherical fruiting body and it has much longer spines.

=== Etymology ===
The generic name 'Hericium', refers to the fertile spines found in this group and means 'pertaining to a hedgehog'. These spines also gave rise to the species name 'cirrhatum' that translates as 'having tendrils'.

== Habitat & distribution ==
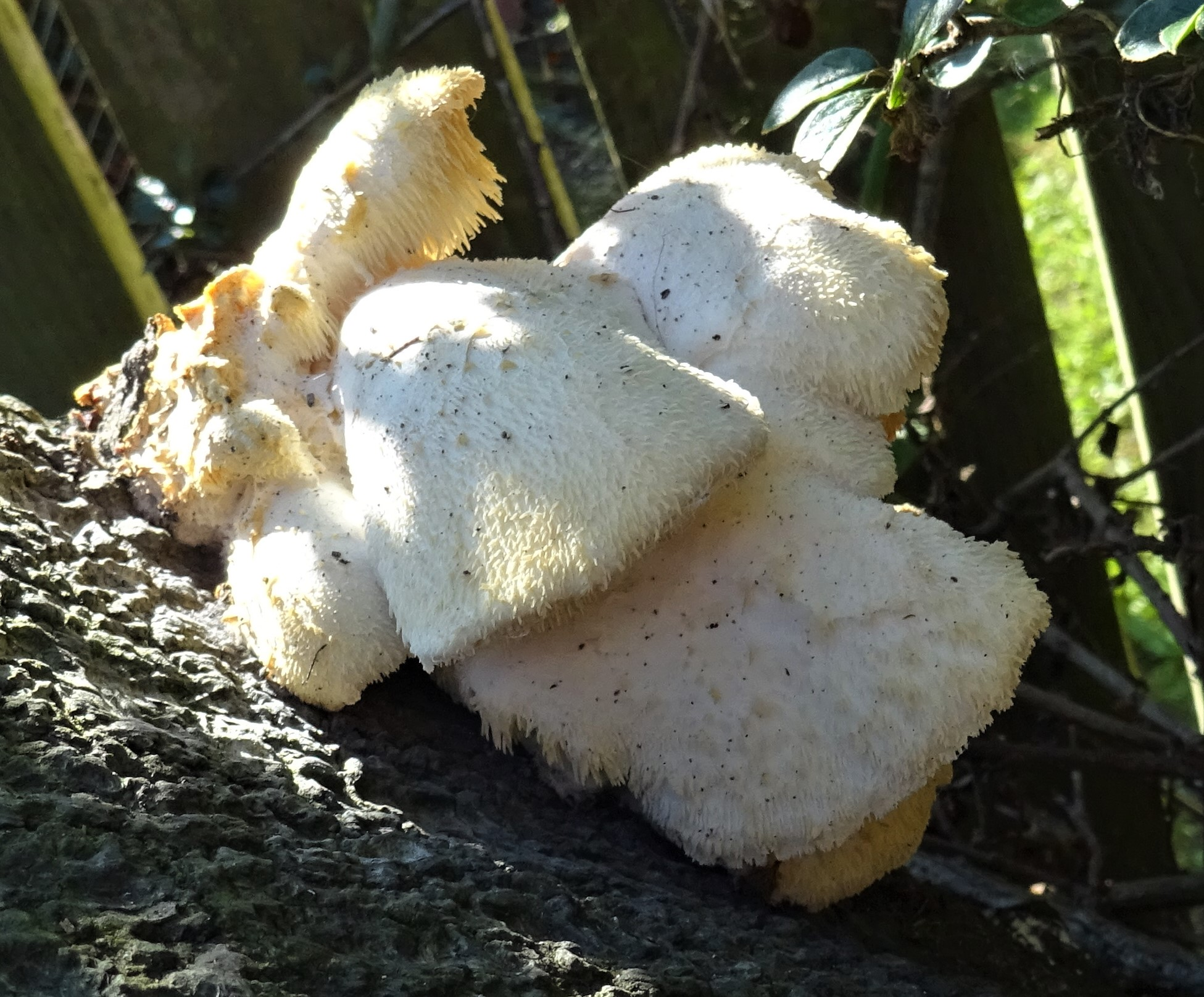
Fruit body on a beech stump

Hericium cirrhatum grows on dead standing hardwood trees, fallen wood or tree stumps of species such as beech (Fagus sylvatica) in old established deciduous woodlands. It has also been recorded on sycamore Acer pseudoplatanus, birch Betula spp., ash Fraxinus spp., oak Quercus robur and elm Ulmus spp. and is found from July to November in Britain. It is vulnerable but was removed from the Red Data List in 2006. As a rare species it is not illegal to pick the fruiting bodies however consideration should be taken to quantity collected to help preserve.

The NBN Database lists only 176 records in Britain of which only 11 are confirmed and none are shown in Scotland although the photographed specimens were found in Kilmaurs, East Ayrshire. It is nowhere common, but records show it to be present in southern England, particularly in the New Forest and in some parts of central and southern mainland Europe.
