= Hericium ptychogasteroides =

Scientific classification
- Domain: Eukaryota
- Kingdom: Fungi
- Division: Basidiomycota
- Class: Agaricomycetes
- Order: Russulales
- Family: Hericiaceae
- Genus: Hericium
- Species: H. ptychogasteroides

Binomial name
- Hericium ptychogasteroides Nikol., 1956

Species of fungus

Hericium ptychogasteroides is a species of fungus in the family Hericiaceae native to Russia, first described by Taisiya Lvovna Nikolajeva in 1956. It was observed growing on dead trunk of Quercus mongolica in Ussurisky Nature Reserve.
