= Hericium bembedjaense =

Scientific classification
- Domain: Eukaryota
- Kingdom: Fungi
- Division: Basidiomycota
- Class: Agaricomycetes
- Order: Russulales
- Family: Hericiaceae
- Genus: Hericium
- Species: H. bembedjaense

Binomial name
- Hericium bembedjaense Jumbam & Aime, 2019

Species of fungus

Hericium bembedjaense is a species of fungus in the family Hericiaceae native to Cameroon, first described by Blaise Jumbam and Mary Catherine Aime in 2019, based on specimens from Dja Biosphere Reserve. It is found growing on Gilbertiodendron dewevrei and can be differentiated from other H. coralloides complex species by substrate and geographical range. It is the only Hericium species that has pleurocystidia.
