= Hericium rajendrae =

Scientific classification
- Domain: Eukaryota
- Kingdom: Fungi
- Division: Basidiomycota
- Class: Agaricomycetes
- Order: Russulales
- Family: Hericiaceae
- Genus: Hericium
- Species: H. rajendrae

Binomial name
- Hericium rajendrae K. Das, Singh, 2019

Species of fungus

Hericium rajendrae is a species of edible fungus in the family Hericiaceae native to the Himalayas, first described by Upendra Singh and Kanad Das in 2019. It can be distinguished from other Hericium growing in India by reddish white to pale red coloured fruiting bodies. It is collected and eaten by the local population, and called by them Lal guchha chyun in Garhwali language.
