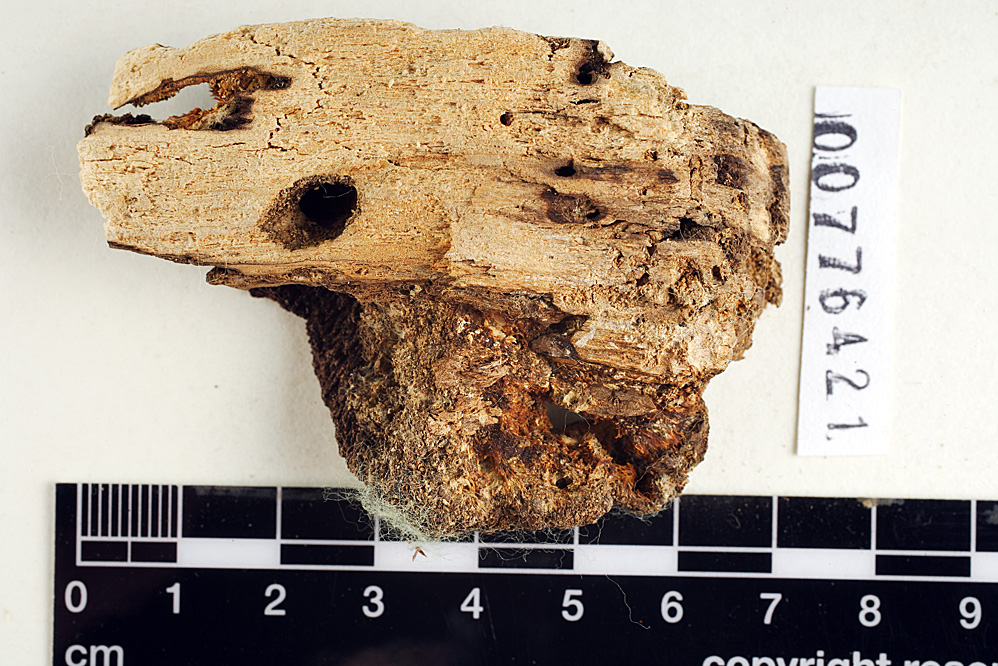

Scientific classification
- Domain: Eukaryota
- Kingdom: Fungi
- Division: Basidiomycota
- Class: Agaricomycetes
- Order: Russulales
- Family: Hericiaceae
- Genus: Hericium
- Species: H. fimbriatum

Binomial name
- Hericium fimbriatum Banker, 1906

= Hericium fimbriatum =

Species of fungus

Hericium fimbriatum is a species of fungus in the family Hericiaceae native to Pennsylvania, USA, first described by Howard James Banker in 1906. It has long teeth (6–8 mm) and fusiform cystidia that protrude through the hymenium. Its basidiospores are 4.3-5.5 × 1.5-2 μm big, and together with other microscopic features resemble those of Mycoacia aurea.
