= Hericium bharengense =

Scientific classification
- Kingdom: Fungi
- Division: Basidiomycota
- Class: Agaricomycetes
- Order: Russulales
- Family: Hericiaceae
- Genus: Hericium
- Species: H. bharengense

Binomial name
- Hericium bharengense K. Das, Stalpers & Ebelhardt, 2011

Species of fungus

Hericium bharengense is a species of fungus in the family Hericiaceae native to Sikkim in India, first described by K. Das, JA Stalpers & Ursula Ebelhardt in 2011. It can be distinguished from related species (H. abietis, H. coralloides and H. erinaceus) by "intricate" branching pattern of hymenophores, moderately long spines, size and ornamentation pattern of fruit bodies.
