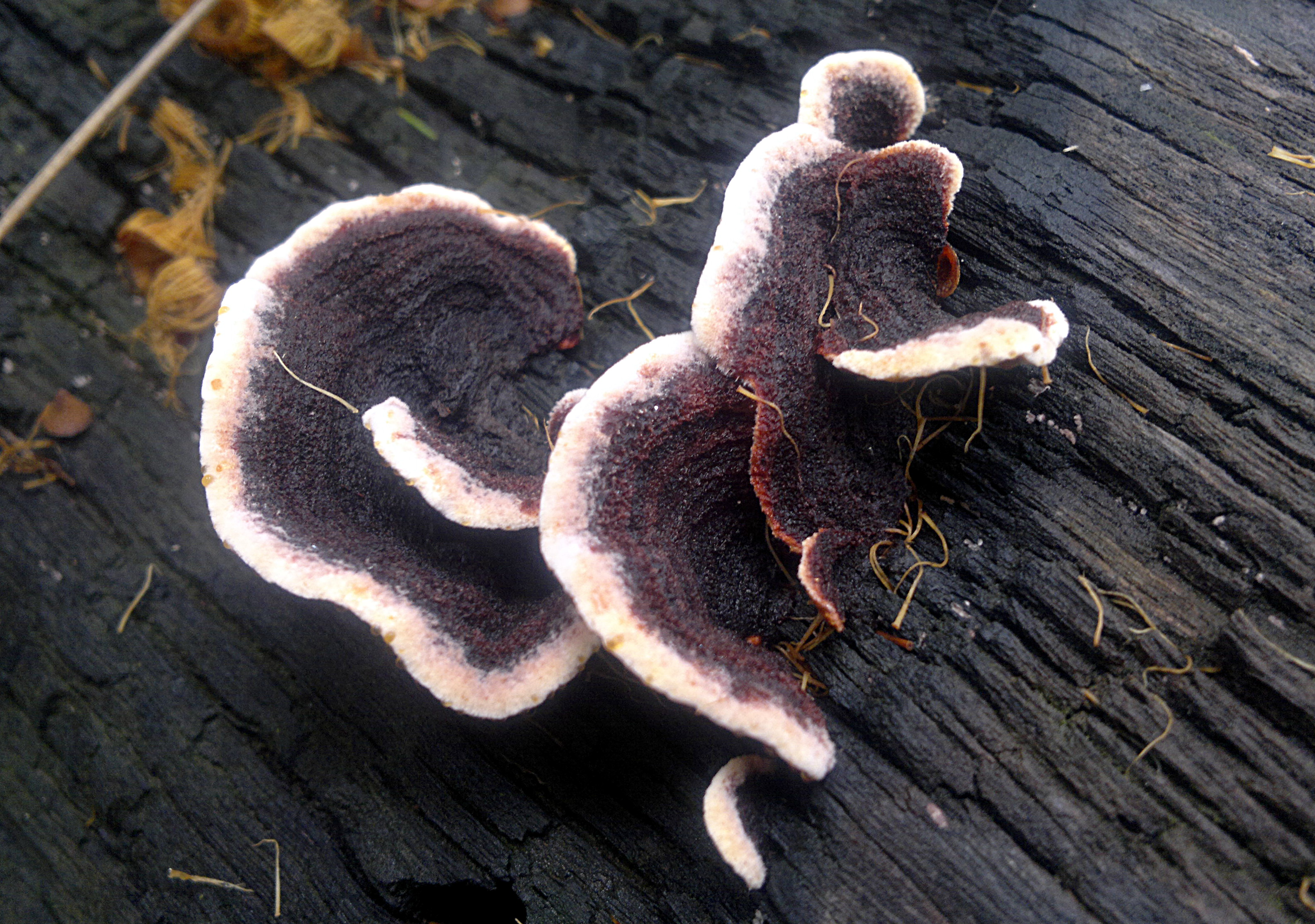

Scientific classification
- Domain: Eukaryota
- Kingdom: Fungi
- Division: Basidiomycota
- Class: Agaricomycetes
- Order: Russulales
- Family: Hericiaceae
- Genus: Laxitextum
- Species: L. bicolor

Binomial name
- Laxitextum bicolor (Pers.) Lentz, 1956

Synonyms
- Lloydella bicolor (Pers.) Bres., (1901); Lloydella fusca (Schrad.) Bres., (1915); Stereum bicolor (Pers.) Pat.,(1903); Stereum bicolor (Pers.) Fr., (1838); Stereum coffeatum Berk. & M.A. Curtis, (1873); Stereum fuscum (Schrad.) P. Karst., (1883); Stereum laxum Lloyd, (1915); Stereum pannosum Cooke, (1879); Thelephora bicolor Pers., (1801); Thelephora fusca Schrad., (1792)

= Laxitextum bicolor =

Species of fungus

Laxitextum bicolor is a plant pathogen fungus. It is inedible.
