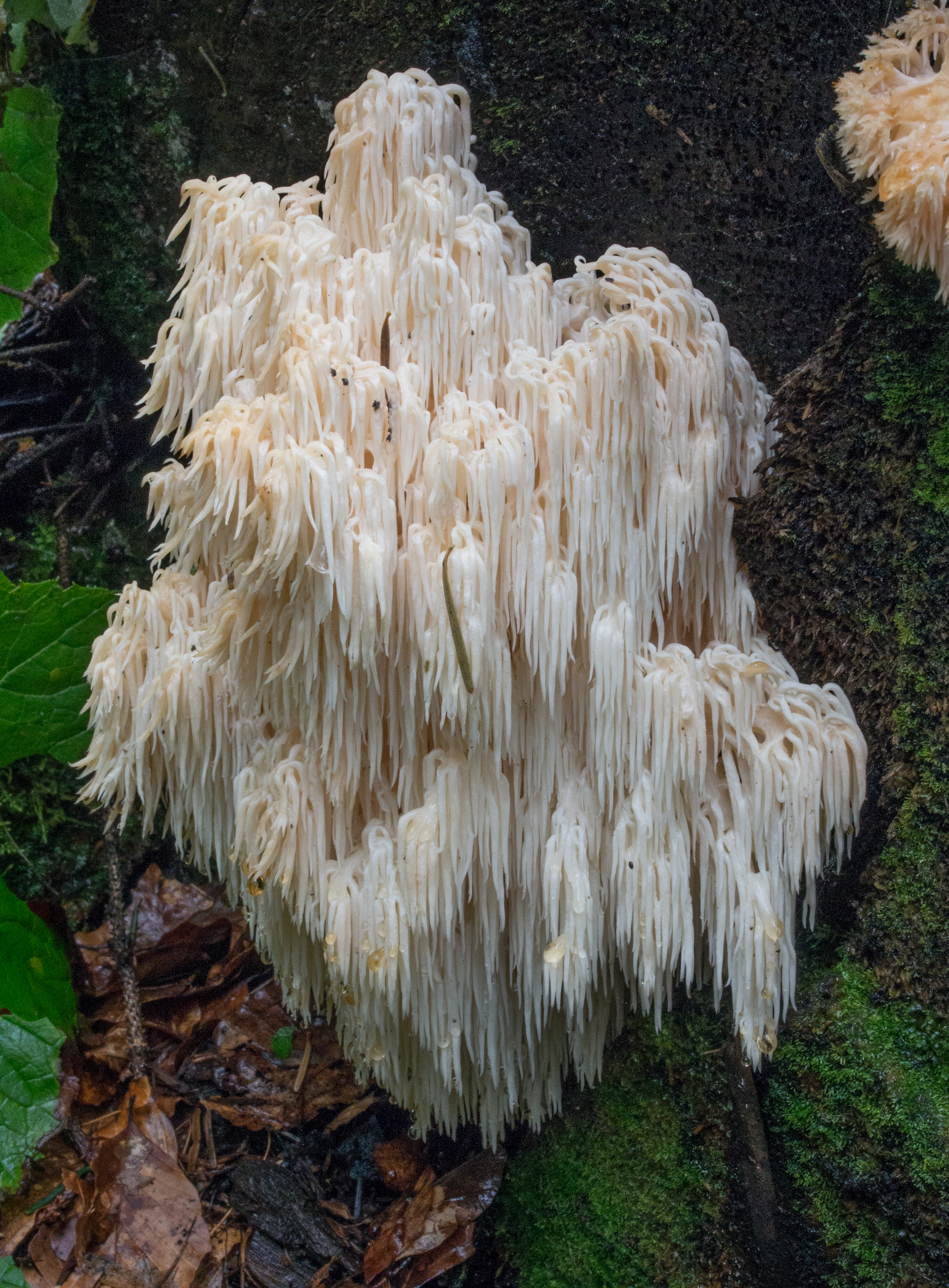

Scientific classification
- Kingdom: Fungi
- Division: Basidiomycota
- Class: Agaricomycetes
- Order: Russulales
- Family: Hericiaceae
- Genus: Hericium
- Species: H. flagellum

Binomial name
- Hericium flagellum (Scop.) Pers., 1797

= Hericium flagellum =

Species of fungus

Hericium flagellum Mycological characteristics
- Teeth on hymenium
- No distinct cap
- Hymenium attachment is not applicable
- Lacks a stipe
- Spore print is white
- Ecology is saprotrophic
- Edibility is edible

Hericium flagellum is a species of fungus in the family Hericiaceae native to Europe, first described by Giovanni Antonio Scopoli, and placed into its current genus by Christiaan Hendrik Persoon in 1797. It was confirmed—using sexual incompatibility studies—to be a distinct species from H. coralloides in 1983. Found in montane areas, typically on newly fallen trunks and stumps of fir (Abies species), especially silver fir with one study finding over half of recorded specimens growing on silver fir deadwood in high conservation value areas. Spores are 5–6.5 by 4.5–5.5 μm.
