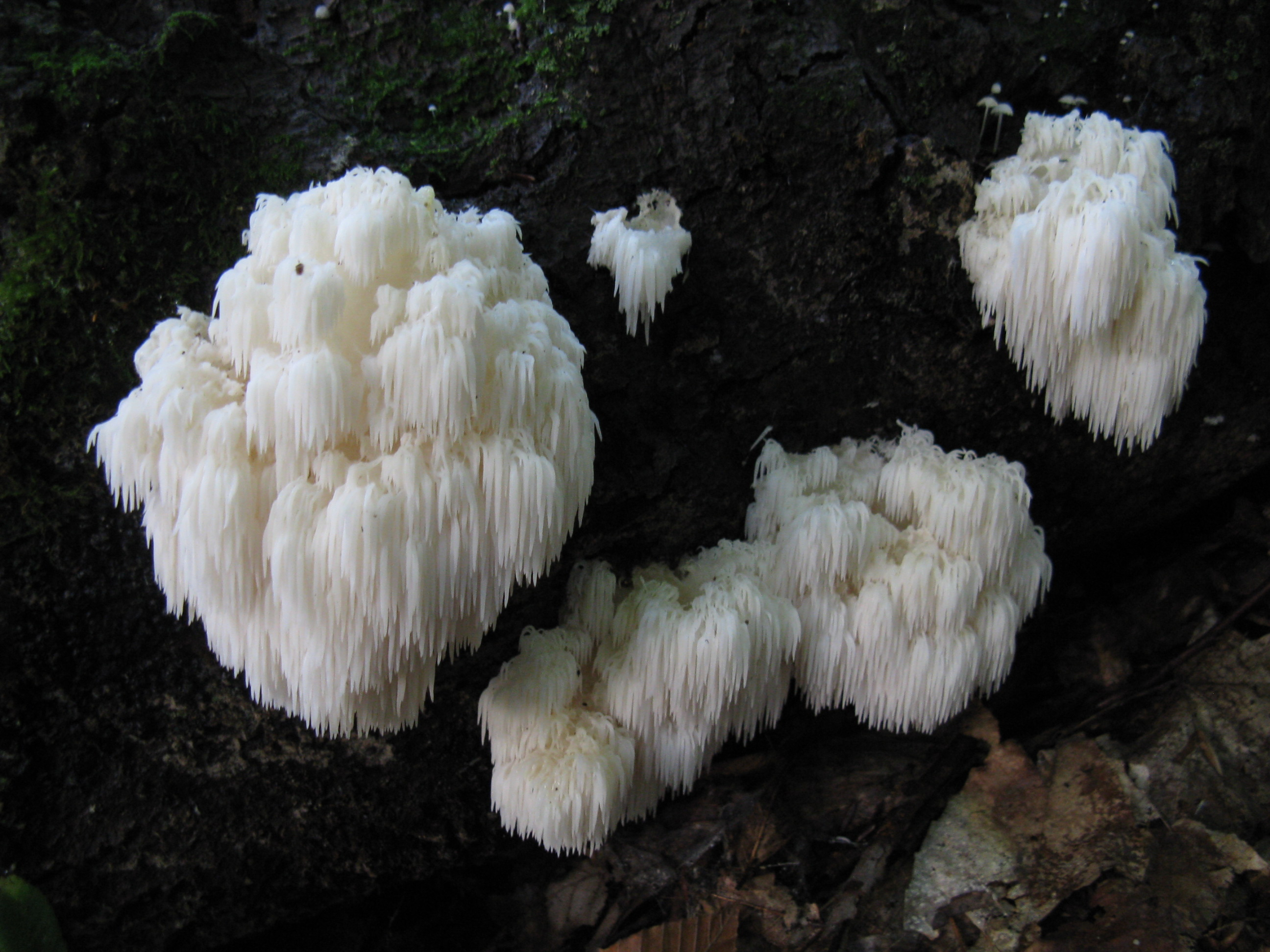

Scientific classification
- Kingdom: Fungi
- Division: Basidiomycota
- Class: Agaricomycetes
- Order: Russulales
- Family: Hericiaceae
- Genus: Hericium
- Species: H. americanum

Binomial name
- Hericium americanum Ginns (1984)

= Hericium americanum =

Species of fungus

Hericium americanum, commonly known as the bear's head tooth fungus is an edible mushroom in the tooth fungus group. It was described as new to science in 1984 by Canadian mycologist James Herbert Ginns.

The fungus is commonly found on decaying trees in the Northern United States and Canada. It grows exceptionally well in the environment of temperate deciduous forests. In the Pacific Northwest, it can be found in October and November.

It was designated as Vermont's state mushroom on May 7, 2024.
