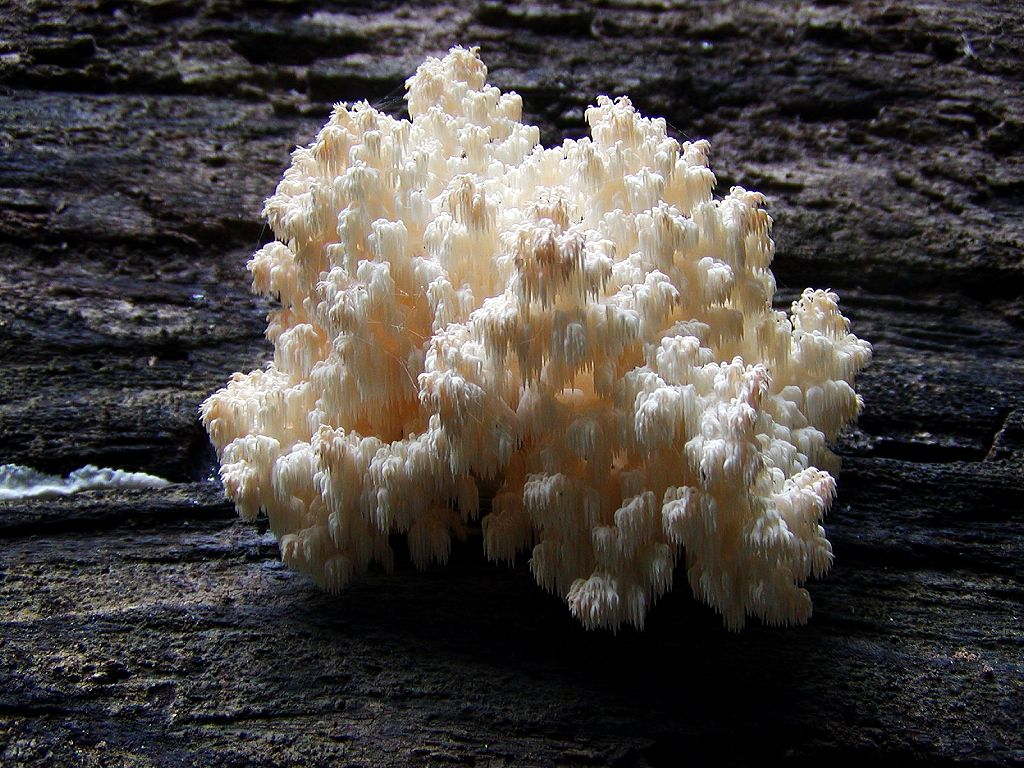
- Hericium coralloides

Scientific classification
- Kingdom: Fungi
- Division: Basidiomycota
- Class: Agaricomycetes
- Order: Russulales
- Family: Hericiaceae
- Genus: Hericium; Pers. (1794)

Type species
- Hericium coralloides (Scop.) Pers. (1794)

Species
- See text

= Hericium =

Genus of fungi

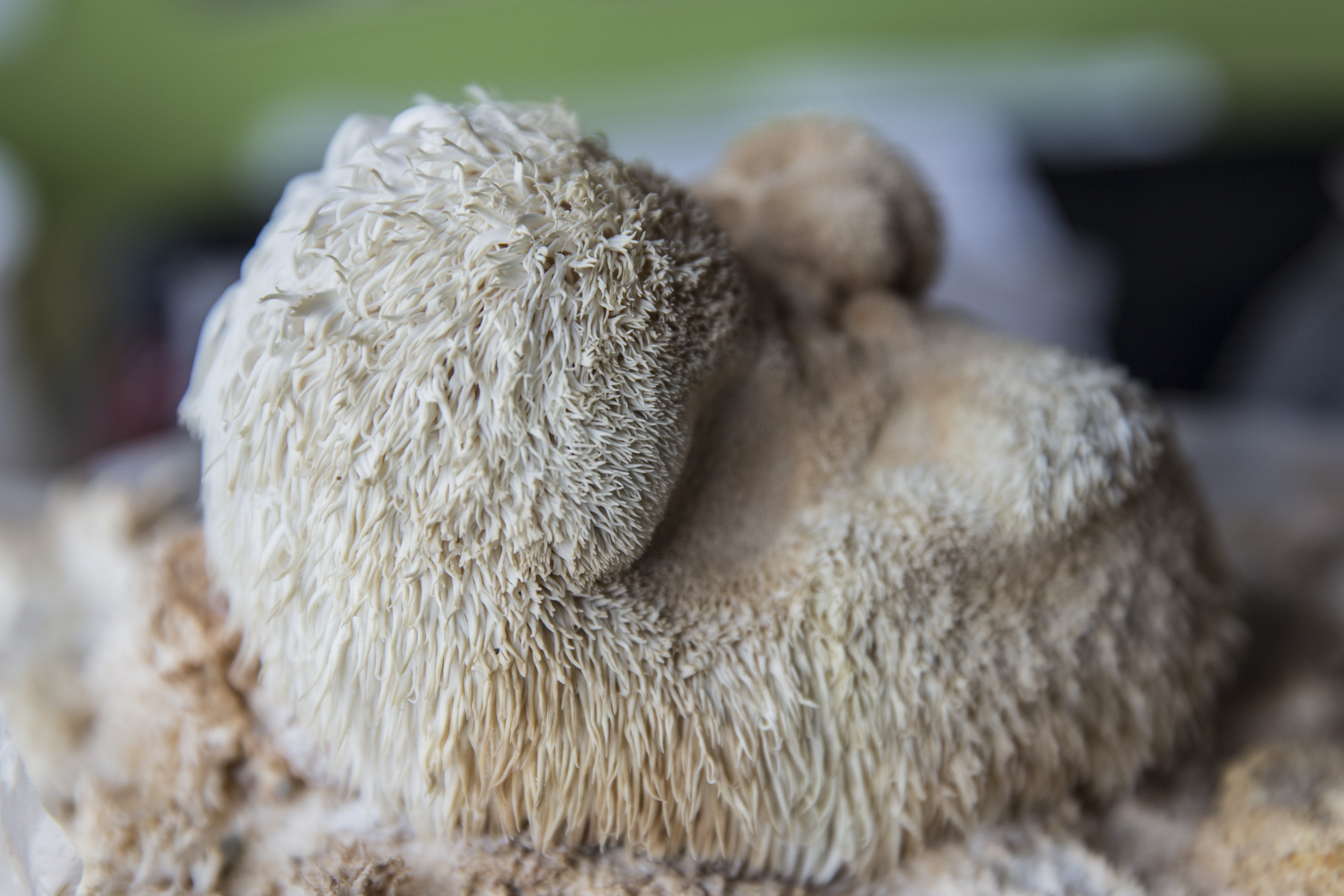
Hericium at the Copernicus Science Centre in Warsaw

Hericium is a genus of edible mushrooms in the family Hericiaceae. Species in this genus are white and fleshy and grow on dead or dying wood; fruiting bodies resemble a mass of fragile icicle-like spines that are suspended from either a branched supporting framework or from a tough, unbranched cushion of tissue.

Their distinctive structures have earned Hericium species a variety of common names—monkey's head, lion's mane, and bear's head are examples. Taxonomically, this genus was previously placed within the order Aphyllophorales, but recent molecular studies now place it in the Russulales.

== Taxonomy ==
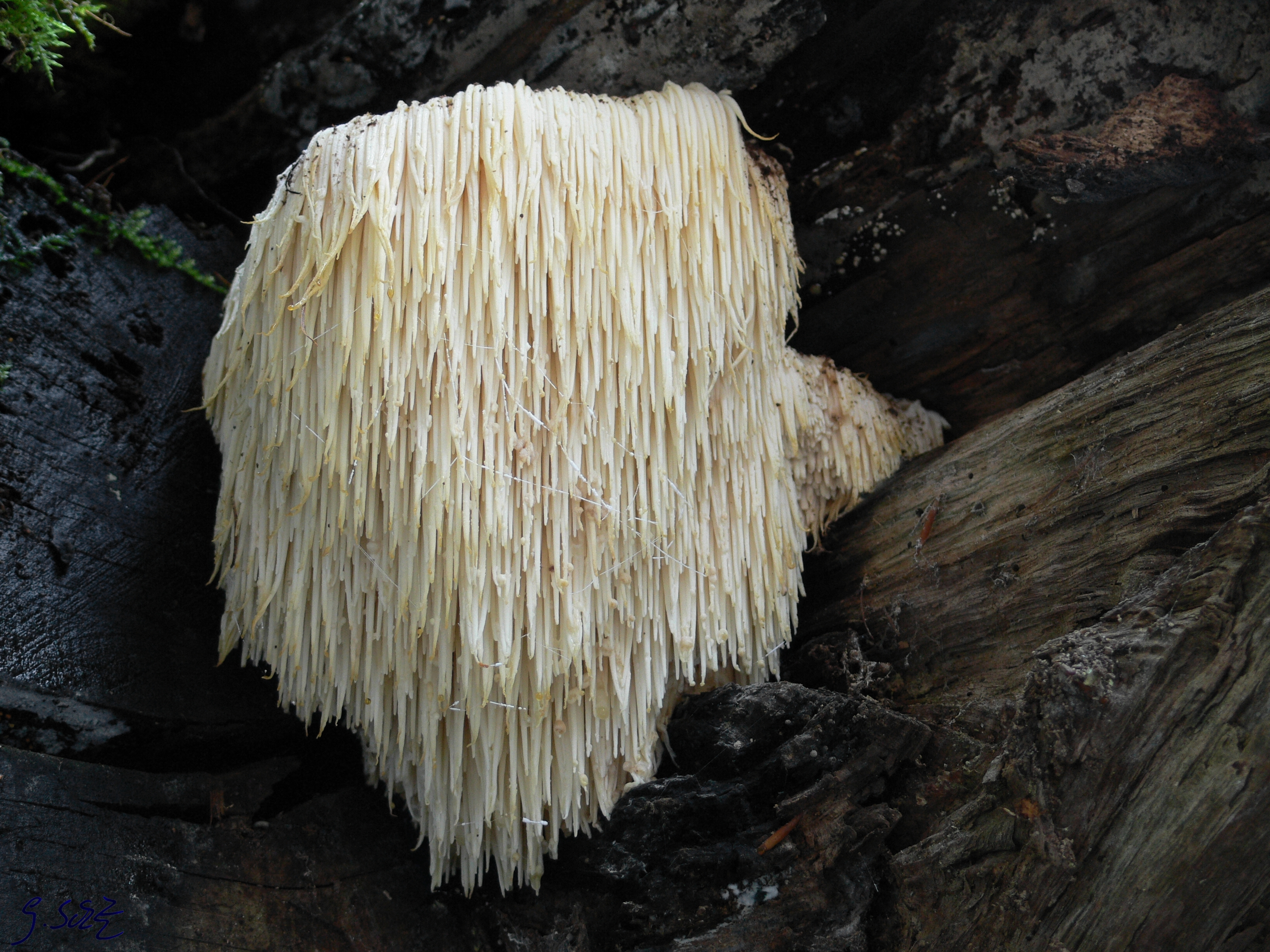
Hericium erinaceus, Lion's mane

The genus Hericium was originally described by Christian Hendrik Persoon in 1794. It was mentioned by Elias Magnus Fries in the Systema Mycologicum (1822); Fries considered it to be synonymous with the tribe Merisma of the genus Hydnum. In 1825 he recognized Hericium as a distinct genus, although not in the same sense as the genus would be known later.

=== Phylogeny ===
In 2004, the phylogenetic relationships of Hericium species were analysed by comparing the rDNA internal transcribed spacer sequences of H. abietis, H. alpestre, H. americanum, H. coralloides, H. erinaceum, H. erinaceus and H. laciniatum. This analysis separated H. erinaceum from the six other Hericium species, and showed that H. erinaceus, H. abietis, H. americanum, and H. coralloides are closely related each to other but genetically diverged from H. alpestre and H. laciniatum. Molecular genetic markers have been developed that allow for quick and sensitive identification of Hericium species using the polymerase chain reaction.

The family Hericiaceae, to which Hericium belongs, belongs to the russuloid clade of basidiomycetes, making it phylogenetically related to the Auriscalpiaceae, the Bondarzewiaceae, and the Echinodontiaceae.

=== Etymology ===
Hericium means hedgehog in Latin. See Wiktionary entries Hericium and ericius.

== Description ==
The fruit bodies typically have short stalks and are attached laterally to the host tree. Mature specimens are easily identified by drooping spines which hang down; the spines may be arranged in clusters or more usually, in rows. Positive identification of immature specimens can be more difficult as they often begin as a single clump, developing their branches as they age. They have no caps and contain spiny amyloid spores and numerous gloeopleurous hyphae filled with oil droplets. The spores are spherical to ellipsoid, smooth or covered with very fine warts.

== Distribution and habitat ==
Hericium species are found extensively in the northern parts of the world, including North America, Europe, and Asia, often growing on old, fallen logs in dark and shaded areas of deciduous and Alpine forests.

== Uses ==
Hericium species are commonly found and consumed in North America and China. The species is readily cultivated. Hericium is used in the folk medicine of China and Japan, but there is no high-quality clinical research as of 2020 to indicate that it has any medicinal or biological properties. The genus Hericium produces the phytochemicals, erinacines and hericenones, which are cyathane metabolites under basic research.

== Species ==
Image	Scientific name	Description	Distribution
	Hericium abietis	Found on dead wood of conifers, especially fir and Douglas fir.	North America
	Hericium americanum ("Bear's-head tooth")	Solitary or clustered on dead or living deciduous wood, rarely on conifers	east of the Great Plains
	Hericium bembedjaense	The only Hericium species that has pleurocystidia and grows in Central Africa	Cameroon
	Hericium bharengense		Sikkim Himalaya (India)
	Hericium botryoides	Found growing on Quercus myrsinifolia.	Sapporo, Japan
	Hericium cirrhatum ("Spine-face")	This species' fruiting body is branched, with shell-shaped caps.	southern England
	Hericium clathroides		Europe
	Hericium coralloides ("Comb tooth"; "coral spine fungus")	Found on beech (Fagus sylvatica) and fir. Spores have dimensions of 3.5–5 by 3–4 μm.	Widely distributed in Europe
	Hericium erinaceus ("Bearded tooth", "tree hedgehog", "monkeyhead")	Found on living oak and beech trees.	North America, Europe and Asia
	Hericium fimbriatum		Pennsylvania, USA
	Hericium fimbrillatum		East Asia
	Hericium flagellum	A European species, confirmed—using sexual incompatibility studies—to be a distinct species from H. coralloides in 1983. Found in montane areas, typically on newly fallen trunks and stumps of Fir (Abies species). Spores are 5–6.5 by 4.5–5.5 μm.	Slovenia
	Hericium novae-zealandiae ("Pekepeke-Kiore")	Found growing on rotten logs in native forest, traditional applications in rongoā herbal medicine	New Zealand
	Hericium ptychogasteroides	Observed growing on dead trunk of Quercus mongolica in Ussurisky Nature Reserve.	Russia
	Hericium rajendrae		Himalayas
	Hericium rajchenbergii	Grows on dead stems of Lithraea molleoides	Argentina
	Hericium yumthangense	Small rooting base, intricate three tier branching system, 8-13mm long spines	India: Sikkim
