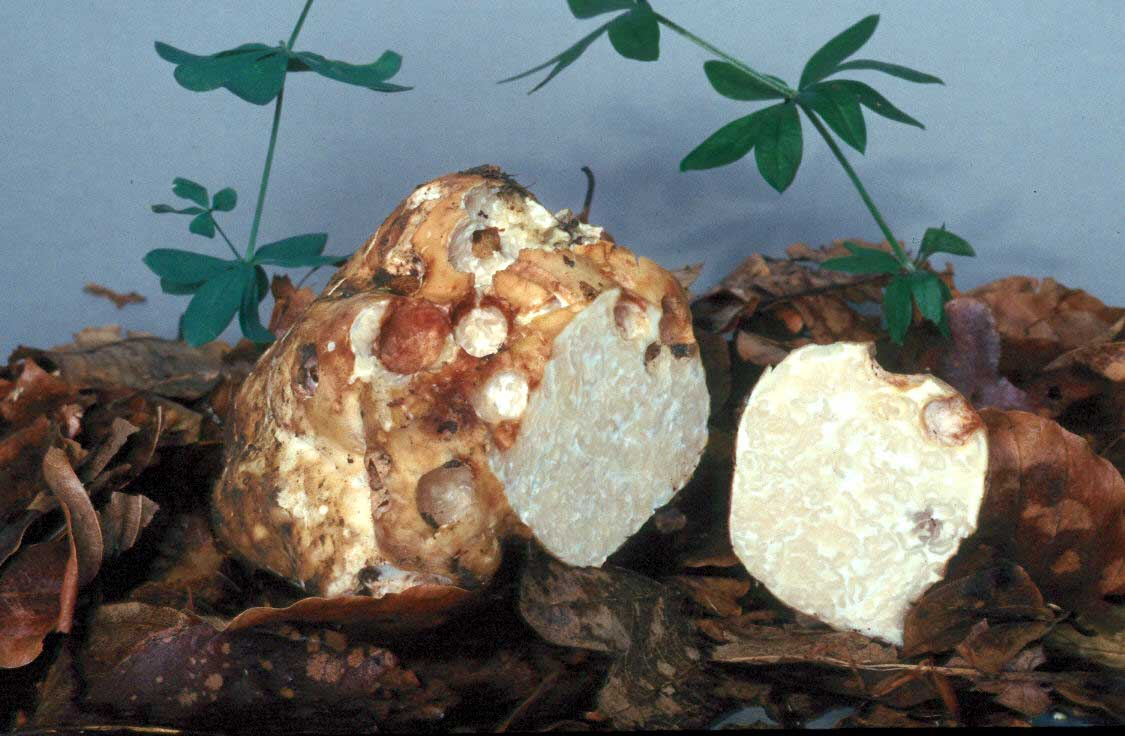
- Choiromyces maeandriformis

Scientific classification
- Domain: Eukaryota
- Kingdom: Fungi
- Division: Ascomycota
- Class: Pezizomycetes
- Order: Pezizales
- Family: Tuberaceae
- Genus: Choiromyces; Vittad. (1831)

Type species
- Choiromyces meandriformis Vittad. (1831)

Species
- Choiromyces aboriginum Choiromyces alveolatus Choiromyces cookei Choiromyces meandriformis Choiromyces tetrasporus

Synonyms
- Tuber sect. Tartufa Gray (1821); Zobelia Opiz (1855); Choeromyces Tul. & C.Tul. (1862); Tartufa (Gray) Kuntze (1891); Piersonia Harkn. (1899)

= Choiromyces =

Genus of fungi

Choiromyces is a genus of truffle-like fungi in the Tuberaceae family. The genus is widespread and contains eight species.

== Species ==
- Choiromyces alveolatus (Harkn.) Trappe
- Choiromyces cerebriformis T.J. Yuan, S.H. Li & Y. Wang
- Choiromyces cookei Gilkey
- Choiromyces helanshanensis Juan Chen & P.G. Liu
- Choiromyces meandriformis Vittad.
- Choiromyces sichuanensis S.P. Wan, Ran Wang & F.Q. Yu
- Choiromyces tetrasporus Velen.
- Choiromyces venosus (Fr.) Th. Fr.
