= Choiromyces aboriginum =

Scientific classification
- Kingdom: Fungi
- Division: Ascomycota
- Class: Pezizomycetes
- Order: Pezizales
- Family: Tuberaceae
- Genus: Choiromyces
- Species: C. aboriginum

Binomial name
- Choiromyces aboriginum Trappe

Species of fungus

Choiromyces aboriginum is a species of truffle-like fungi in genus Choiromyces, which is part of the Tuberaceae family. It is found in several regions in Australia, where it has been used as a food and as a source of water.

== Distribution ==
This fungus is found in the dry areas of South Australia, Western Australia and the Northern Territory.

== Uses ==
In Australia, it has been used as traditional native food and has also been used as a source of water. The fruiting bodies were eaten raw or cooked and Kalotas reported one experience, as follows: "They were cooked in hot sand and ashes for over an hour, and then eaten. They had a rather soft consistency (a texture akin to that of soft, camembert-like cheese) and a bland taste. Cooked specimens left for 24 hours and then reheated developed a flavour like that of baked cheese."
