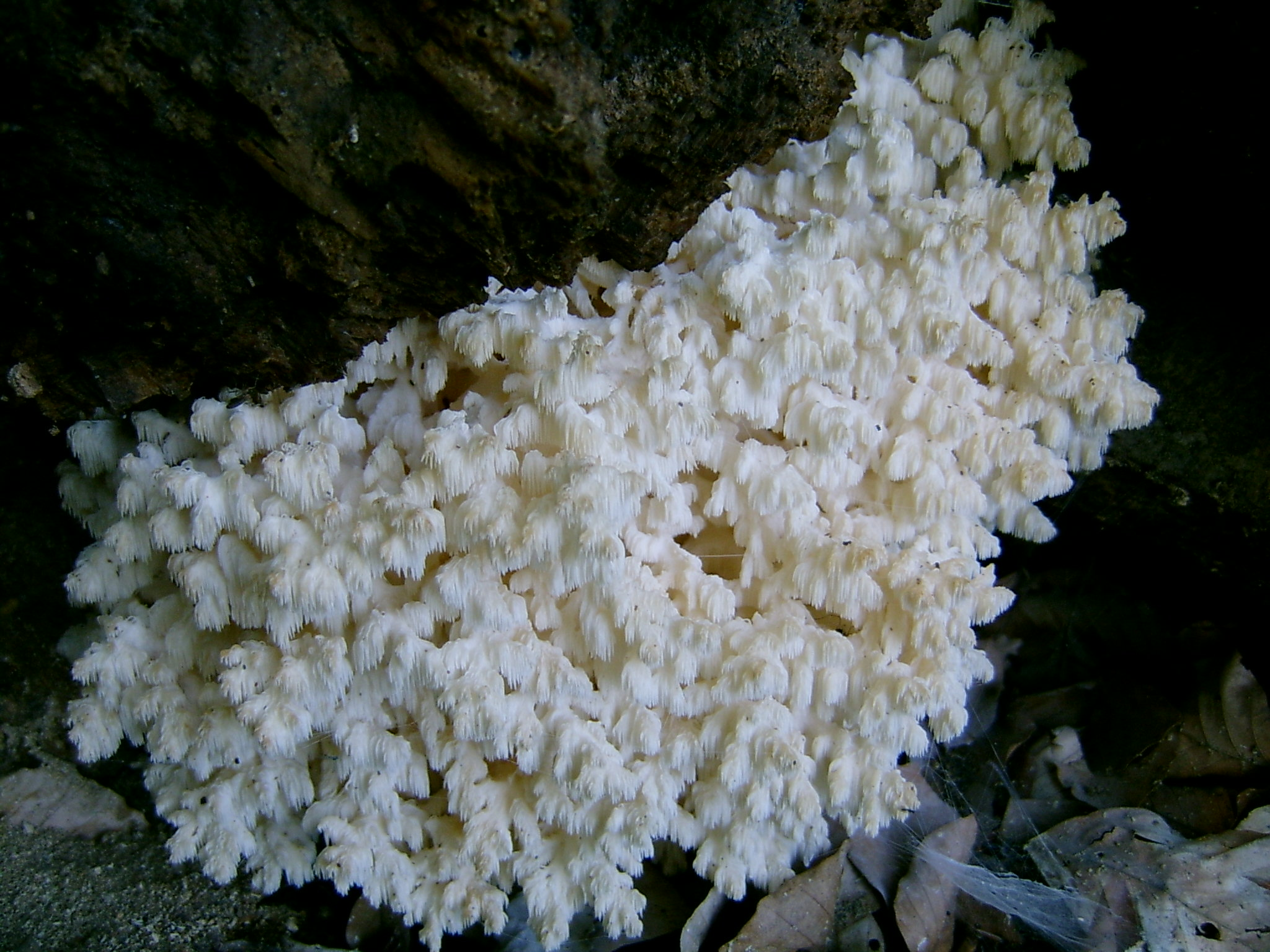

Scientific classification
- Domain: Eukaryota
- Kingdom: Fungi
- Division: Basidiomycota
- Class: Agaricomycetes
- Order: Russulales
- Family: Hericiaceae
- Genus: Hericium
- Species: H. clathroides

Binomial name
- Hericium clathroides (Pall.) Pers.

Synonyms
- Dryodon clathroides (Pall.) P. Karst. 1882; Hydnum clathroides Pall. 1773; Hydnum coralloides var. clathroides (Pall.) Pers. 1801; Merisma clathroides (Pall.) Spreng. 1827

= Hericium clathroides =

Species of fungus

Hericium clathroides Mycological characteristics
- Teeth on hymenium
- No distinct cap
- Hymenium attachment is not applicable
- Lacks a stipe
- Spore print is white
- Ecology is saprotrophic
- Edibility is edible

Hericium clathroides is a species of an edible fungus in the Hericiaceae family.

== Characteristics ==
This species was distinguished by some authors from H. coralloides based on its substrate - beech wood (rarely other hardwoods). Another feature used to distinguish the two species is that H. coralloides grows hymenophore spines in tufts. Young fruitbodies are edible.

== Taxonomy ==
The species was described under the name Hydnum clathroides by Peter Simon Pallas in the second volume of Reise durch verschiedene Provinzen des rußischen Reichs, published in 1773. It was moved to Hericium genus by Christiaan Hendrik Persoon in 1797. The approval work for this taxon is the first volume of Systema Mycologicum by Elias Magnus Fries published in 1821. There it was classified in Merisma within Hydnum genus.

In 1959 Rudolf Arnold Maas Geesteranus proved the misapplication and approval of the epithet by Elias Fries and proposed a change in the treatment of the taxon H. clathroides. Until now, specimens found on fir (Abies) were traditionally called this, but Maas Geesteranus assigned this name to the species fruiting on beech (Fagus). For the species developing in the fir tree, he proposed Scopoli's approach to classify it as H. coralloides. Some mycologists, like Stanisław Domański, André Marchand and Theodore Louis Jahn accepted new definitions. Nils Hallenberg in his 1983 analysis of European Hericium (and his interbreeding experiments of beech and fir species) doubted the separation of two species and proposed H. coralloides neotype. Some authors, like Władysław Wojewoda, followed his approach. Index Fungorum considers this taxon verified.
