= Erinacine =

Substances isolated from the mycelium of lion's mane mushrooms

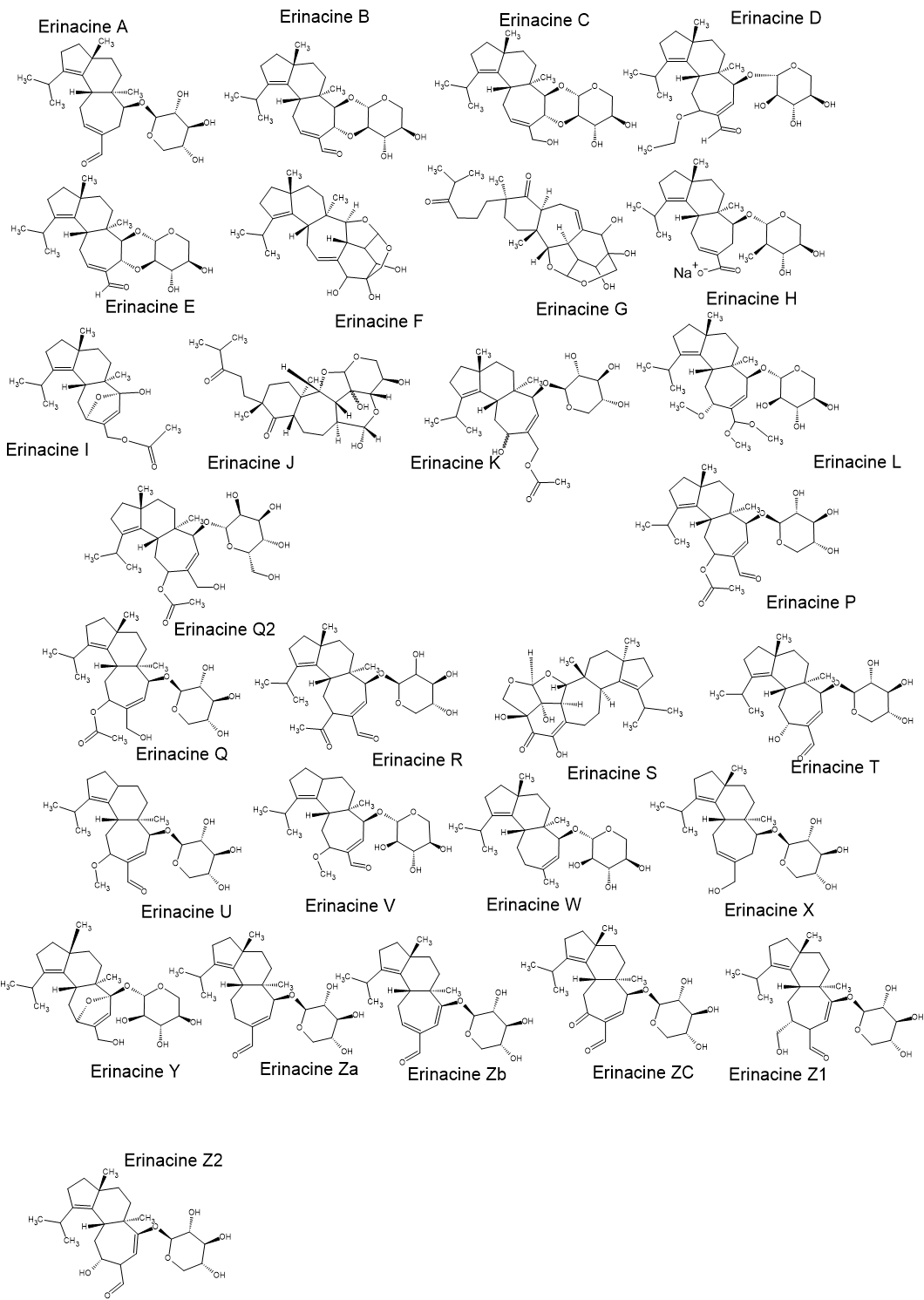
Chemical structures of Erinacines A-L, P, Q1, Q2, R-Y, Z1, Z2, Za-Zc

Erinacines are natural substances isolated from the mycelium of Hericium erinaceus (lion's mane mushroom). They belong to the group of cyathin diterpenoids (erinacines A–K, P, Q, S, U) and are subjects of pharmacological research, which largely focuses on the benefits of erinacine on the brain. All erinacines are able to readily cross the blood–brain barrier in vivo, which largely influences the bioavailability of the compounds in the brain.

== Erinacine A ==
Erinacine A, isolated from the cultured mycelia of Hericium erinaceus, the main representative of this compounds group, has an enhancing effect on nerve growth factor synthesis in vitro. It also increases the levels of catecholamines in the central nervous system of rats.. Erinacine A has been observed to lead to the activation of antioxidant pathways including the transcription factor Nrf2.

Stimulator of nerve growth factor (NGF) synthesis in vitro((250.1 ± 36.2) pg/mL at 1.0 mmol/L), weak cytotoxicity against PC12 cells (IC50: 73.7 μmol/L), Anti‐methicillin-resistant Staphylococcus aureus (MRSA) activity

Erinacine A has also been prepared by total synthesis.

== Erinacine B ==
Stimulator of NGF synthesis in vitro((129.7 ± 6.5) pg/mL at 1.0 mmol/L)

== Erinacine C ==
Erinacine C has also been observed to activate the transcription factor Nrf2 and has been observed to play a role in neurogenesis and neuroplasticity.

Stimulator of NGF synthesis in vitro((299.1 ± 59.6) pg/mL at 1.0 mmol/L)

== Erinacine D ==
Stimulators of NGF synthesis(amount of NGF: 141.5 pg/mL at 1.67 mmol/L)

== Erinacine E ==
Erinacine E is a kappa opioid receptor agonist.

Stimulators of NGF synthesis by astrocytes(amount of NGF: (105.0 ± 5.2) pg/mL at 5.0 mmol/L)

== Erinacine F ==
Stimulators of NGF synthesis by astrocytes(amount of NGF: (175.0 ± 52.0) pg/mL at 5.0 mmol/L)

== Erinacine G ==
Stimulators of NGF synthesis by astrocytes

== Erinacine H ==
Obvious NGF stimulating activity, 33.3 g/mL, five times more NGF (31.5 pg/mL)

== Erinacine I ==
No stimulatory activity of NGF synthesis in astrocytes

== Erinacine J ==
Inactive against MRSA

== Erinacine K ==
Anti-MRSA activity(500 μmol/L)

== Erinacine L ==
Erinacine L is the only xyloside-cyathane diterpene currently found to contain a hemiacetal group. EL with hemiacetal group has excellent neurotrophic and anti-neuroinflammatory activities, suggesting that the hemiacetal moiety may be an essential pharmacophore for the treatment of neurodegenerative diseases.

== Erinacine P ==
Significant neurotrophic effects(2.5single bond10 μmol/L, at 10 μmol/L: percentage of neurite-bearing cells: 48.3%)

== Erinacine S ==
Erinacine S has been shown to reduce neuropathic pain in vivo and can increase myelination in vivo.

Elevated levels of insulin-degrading enzymes(2.395 g/kg BW (H. erinaceus mycelial extract equivalent to 50 mg/kg BW) the male Sprague-Dawley rats of pharmacokinetics: 15.13%)

== Erinacine T ==
Promotion of PC12 cells differentiation and axonal growth (2.5single bond10 mol/L, at 10 μmol/L: percentage of neurite-bearing cells: 43.7%)

== Erinacine U ==
Promote the neurite growth of PC12 cells (2.5single bond10 μmol/L, at 10 μmol/L: percentage of neurite-bearing cells: 76.31%

== Erinacine V ==
Promote the neurite growth of PC12 cells (2.5single bond10 μmol/L, at 10 μmol/L: percentage of neurite-bearing cells: 65.3%)

== Erinacines Z1,Z2 ==
Z1- Promote PC12 cell differentiation and neurite growth(potent cytotoxicity against HL-60 cell lines: IC50: 8.9 μmol/L)

Z2- Promote PC12 cell differentiation and neurite growth(potent cytotoxicity against HL-60 cell lines: IC50: 0.5 μmol/)
