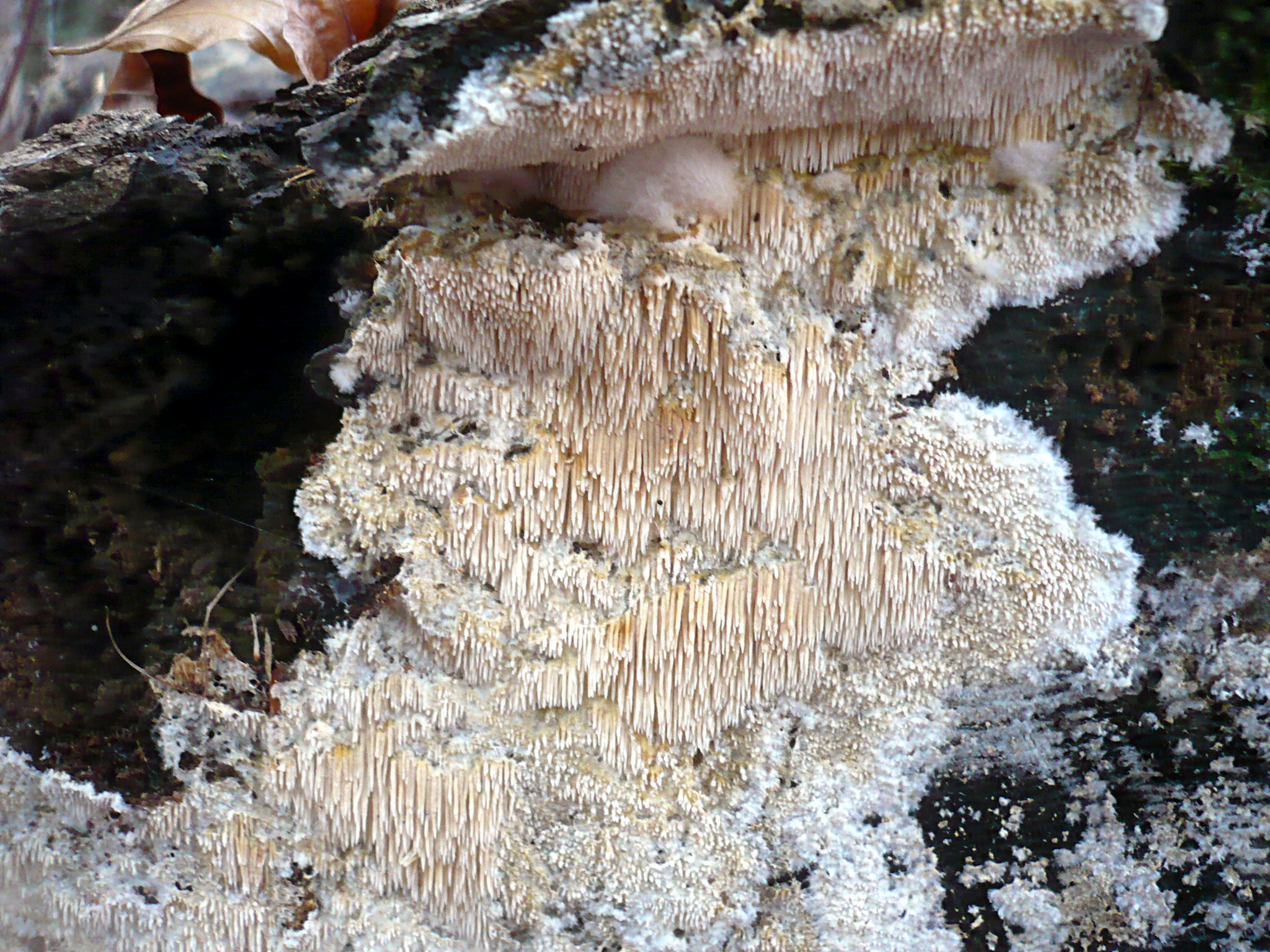
- Dentipellis fragilis

Scientific classification
- Kingdom: Fungi
- Division: Basidiomycota
- Class: Agaricomycetes
- Order: Russulales
- Family: Hericiaceae
- Genus: Dentipellis; Donk (1962)

Type species
- Dentipellis fragilis Donk (1962)

Synonyms
- Amylodontia Nikol. (1967)

= Dentipellis =

Genus of fungi

Dentipellis is a genus of fungi in the family Hericiaceae. It was circumscribed by Dutch mycologist Marinus Anton Donk in 1962. Species in the genus have membranous fruit bodies that are either completely resupinate or effuso-reflexed (stretched out flat on the substrate but turned up at the edges). The hymenium (spore-bearing surface) bears "teeth".

== Species ==
- Dentipellis acystidiata
- Dentipellis coniferarum
- Dentipellis dissita
- Dentipellis echinospora
- Dentipellis fragilis
- Dentipellis isidioides
- Dentipellis macrodon
- Dentipellis microspora
- Dentipellis parmastoi
- Dentipellis separans
- Dentipellis subseparans
- Dentipellis tasmanica
