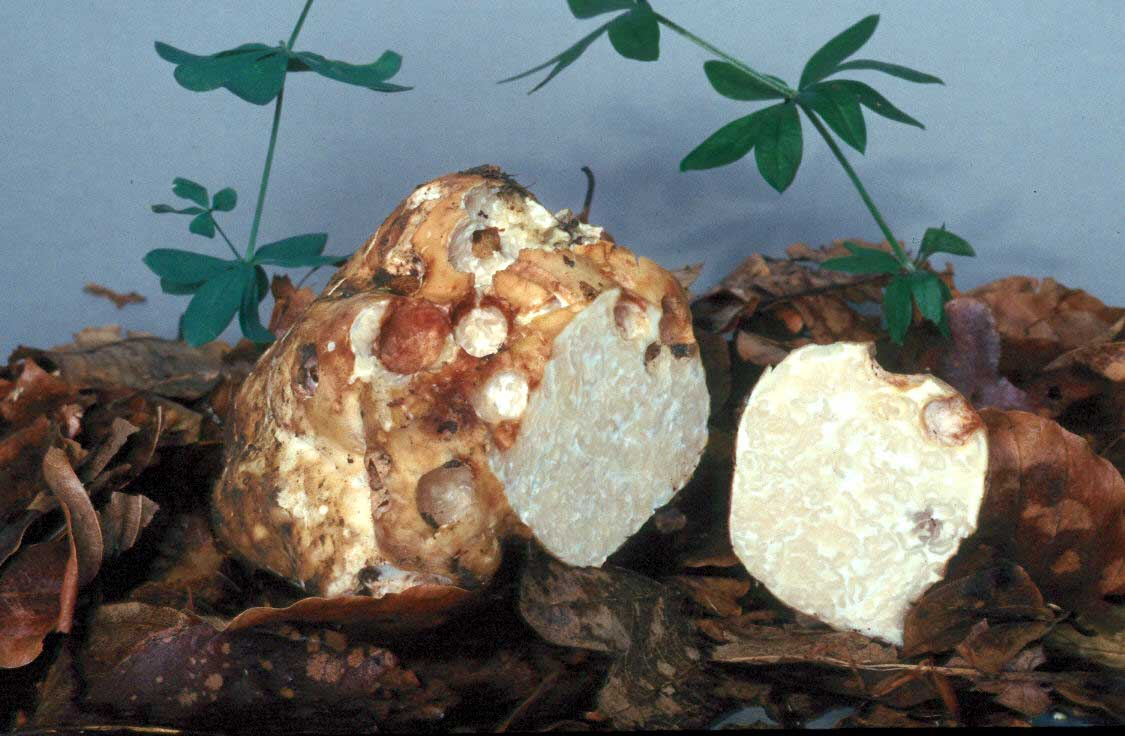

Scientific classification
- Domain: Eukaryota
- Kingdom: Fungi
- Division: Ascomycota
- Class: Pezizomycetes
- Order: Pezizales
- Family: Tuberaceae
- Genus: Choiromyces
- Species: C. meandriformis

Binomial name
- Choiromyces meandriformis Vittad.

= Choiromyces meandriformis =

Species of fungus

Choiromyces meandriformis is a species of fungus belonging to the family Tuberaceae.

It is native to Europe.
