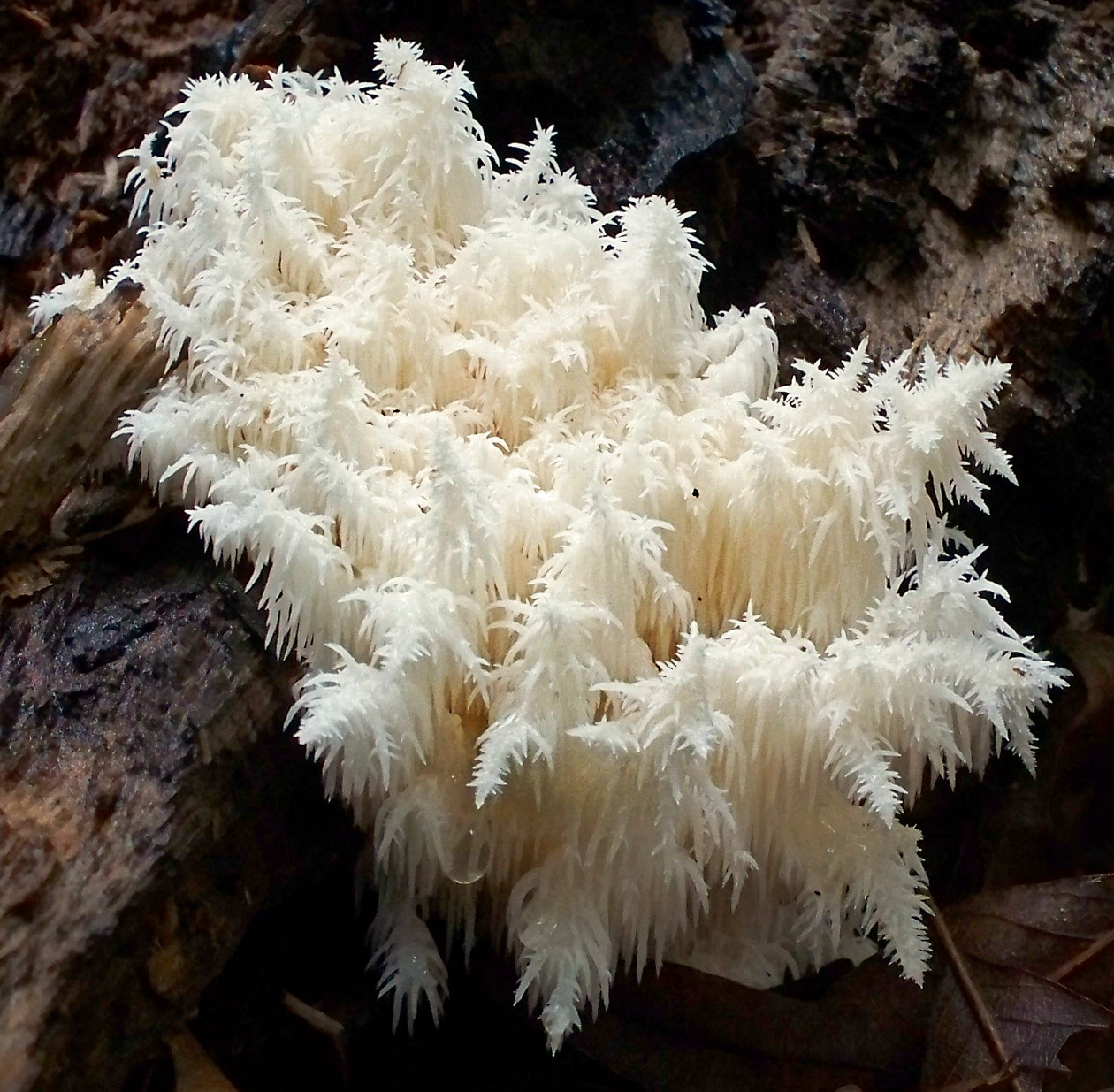

Scientific classification
- Kingdom: Fungi
- Division: Basidiomycota
- Class: Agaricomycetes
- Order: Russulales
- Family: Hericiaceae
- Genus: Hericium
- Species: H. coralloides

Binomial name
- Hericium coralloides (Scop.) Pers.

= Hericium coralloides =

Species of fungus

Hericium coralloides
- Mycological characteristics
- Teeth on hymenium
- No distinct cap
- Hymenium attachment is not applicable
- Lacks a stipe
- Spore print is white
- Ecology is saprotrophic
- Edibility is edible

Hericium coralloides is a saprotrophic fungus, commonly known as coral tooth fungus or comb coral mushroom.

== Description ==
The fruiting body is 4–18 centimetres (1 1/2–7 in) across, whitish, and heavily branched and toothed. Both the flesh and the spore print are white.

=== Similar species ===
It resembles Hericium abietis and H. erinaceus.

== Distribution and habitat ==
It is found throughout North America, Eurasia and Australia, growing on dead hardwood trees. It can be found from July to October in the east and November to March in the west.

== Uses ==
The species is edible and good when young, but as it ages the branches and hanging spines become brittle and turn a light shade of yellowish brown.It is medicinal mushroom too.
