= Hericenone =

Class of chemical compounds

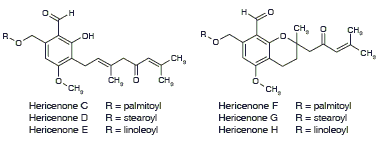
Hericenone C-H

Hericenones is a class of substituted benzaldehydes that are isolated from fungi in the genus Hericium (the lion's mane mushrooms) that promote nerve growth factor synthesis in vitro.

== Hericenones ==
Hericenones
Name	IUPAC name	Reference
Hericenone A	5-[(2E)-3,7-dimethyl-5-oxoocta-2,6-dienyl]-4-hydroxy-6-methoxy-3H-2-benzofuran-1-one	
Hericenone B	6-[(2Z)-3,7-dimethyl-5-oxoocta-2,6-dienyl]-7-hydroxy-5-methoxy-2-(2-phenylethyl)-3H-isoindol-1-one	
Hericenone C	[4-[(2E)-3,7-dimethyl-5-oxoocta-2,6-dienyl]-2-formyl-3-hydroxy-5-methoxyphenyl]methyl hexadecanoate	
Hericenone D	[4-[(2E)-3,7-dimethyl-5-oxoocta-2,6-dienyl]-2-formyl-3-hydroxy-5-methoxyphenyl]methyl octadecanoate	
Hericenone E	[4-[(2E)-3,7-dimethyl-5-oxoocta-2,6-dienyl]-2-formyl-3-hydroxy-5-methoxyphenyl]methyl (9E,12E)-octadeca-9,12-dienoate	
Hericenone F	[8-formyl-5-methoxy-2-methyl-2-(4-methyl-2-oxopent-3-enyl)-3,4-dihydrochromen-7-yl]methyl hexadecanoate	
Hericenone G	[8-formyl-5-methoxy-2-methyl-2-(4-methyl-2-oxopent-3-enyl)-3,4-dihydrochromen-7-yl]methyl octadecanoate	
Hericenone H	[8-formyl-5-methoxy-2-methyl-2-(4-methyl-2-oxopent-3-enyl)-3,4-dihydrochromen-7-yl]methyl (9E,12E)-octadeca-9,12-dienoate	
Hericenone I		
Hericenone J	6-[(2E)-3,7-dimethylocta-2,6-dienyl]-7-hydroxy-5-methoxy-3H-2-benzofuran-1-one	
Hericenone K	2-(4-hydroxy-4-methyl-2-oxopentyl)-5-methoxy-2-methyl-4,7-dihydro-3H-furo[3,4-h]chromen-9-one	
