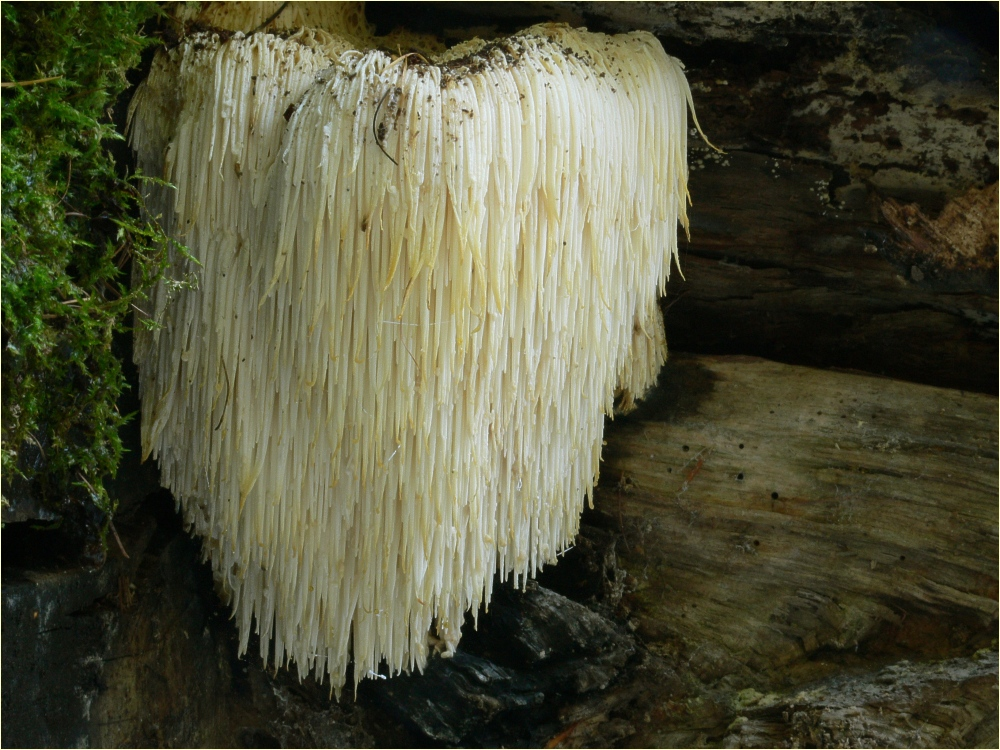
- Hericium erinaceus

Scientific classification
- Kingdom: Fungi
- Division: Basidiomycota
- Class: Agaricomycetes
- Order: Russulales
- Family: Hericiaceae; Donk (1964)

Type genus
- Hericium Pers. (1794)

Genera
- Dentipellicula; Dentipellis; Dentipratulum; Hericium; Laxitextum

= Hericiaceae =

Family of fungi

The Hericiaceae are a family of fungi in the order Russulales. The best known genus is Hericium, species of which are valued for their medicinal properties in Oriental medicine. Taxa are mainly known from north temperate regions, and are saprobic on rotting wood. Phylogenetic analysis suggests that Hericiaceae belongs to the russuloid clade of homobasidiomycetes, and morphological and molecular evidence links it with the families Auriscalpiaceae, Bondarzewiaceae and Echinodontiaceae. Originally proposed in 1961 by Taisiya Lvovna Nikolayeva as a subfamily of Hydnaceae, Hericiaceae was formally published as a family by Marinus Anton Donk in 1964.

== Description ==
Species of this family commonly have fruitbodies with pegs, spines, or teeth hanging from the hymenium.
