= C11H12O3 =

The molecular formula C_{11}H_{12}O_{3} (molar mass: 192.21 g/mol) may refer to:

- Carpacin
- Dehydrozingerone
- 4-(4-Methylphenyl)-4-oxobutanoic acid
- Myristicin
- Ocean propanal
- Croweacin
- Quercinol
