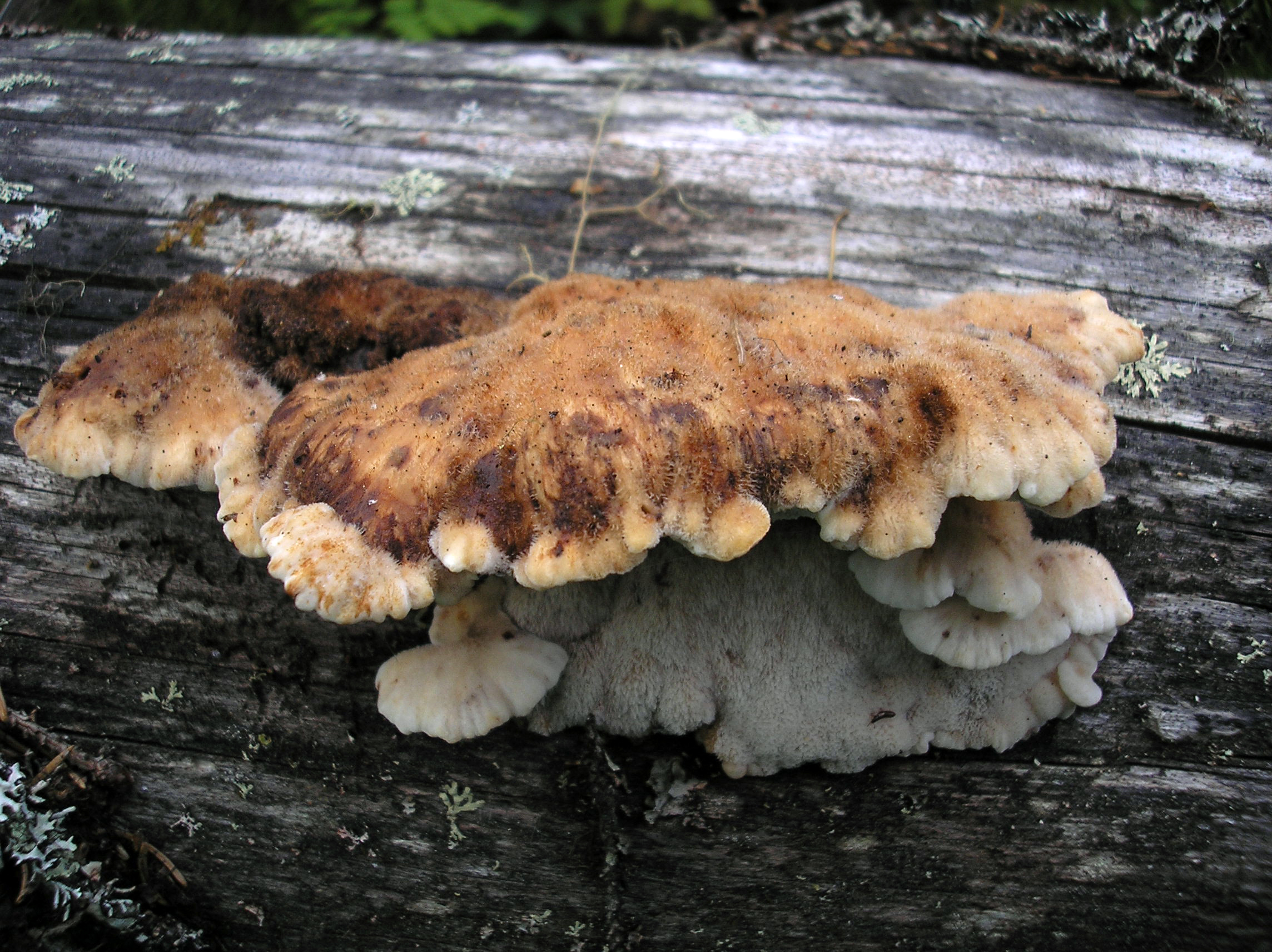

Scientific classification
- Kingdom: Fungi
- Division: Basidiomycota
- Class: Agaricomycetes
- Order: Polyporales
- Family: Fomitopsidaceae
- Genus: Amylocystis
- Species: A. lapponica

Binomial name
- Amylocystis lapponica (Romell) Bondartsev & Singer (1944)

Synonyms
- Polyporus lapponicus Romell (1911); Polyporus ursinus Lloyd (1915); Ungulina lapponica (Romell) Pilát (1934); Leptoporus lapponicus (Romell) Pilát (1938); Tyromyces lapponicus (Romell) J.Lowe (1975)

= Amylocystis lapponica =

Species of fungus

Amylocystis lapponica (alternatively spelled Amylocystis lapponicus) is a species of bracket fungus in the family Fomitopsidaceae, and the type species of genus Amylocystis. It produces medium-sized, annual fruit bodies that are soft, and have a strong, distinct smell. The fungus is a saprophyte that feeds on coniferous wood of logs lying on the ground, and causes brown rot. It is a rather rare species that only occurs in old-growth forest.

== Taxonomy ==
The fungus was originally described by Swedish mycologist Lars Romell in 1911, who called it Polyporus lapponicus. The type collection was made in Nattavaara (Sweden), where it was found growing on fir. Romell initially thought the fungus might be Climacocystis borealis, but ultimately rejected that opinion, as that species has an easily breakable fruit body, and its spores are of different size and shape.

Amylocystis lapponica has been shuffled to several different polypore genera in its taxonomic history, including Ungulina (Pilát, 1934), Leptoporus (Pilát, 1938), and Tyromyces (J.Lowe, 1975). The fungus has microscopic characteristics that are typical of the genus Tyromyces, but differs by the presence of thick-walled amyloid cystidia in the hymenium. For this reason, A. Bondartsev and Rolf Singer created the genus Amylocystis in 1944 to contain the fungus. Polyporus ursinus, proposed by Curtis Gates Lloyd in 1915, is now considered a synonym of Amylocystis lapponica.

== Description ==
The fungus has fruit bodies that range in form from crust-like to effused-reflexed (mostly crust-like, with edges curling out to form rudimentary caps). Individual fruit bodies measure up to 15 cm (6 in) wide, and have a dirty whitish to light buff surface colour that becomes reddish brown when dry or if bruised.

Amylocystis lapponica has a monomitic hyphal system, containing only generative hyphae. These hyphae are mostly thick-walled and measure 4–10.5 μm thick. The spores are cylindrical, hyaline, and smooth, measuring 8–11 by 2.5–3.5 μm. They are unreactive in Melzer's reagent.

Oligoporus fragilis is similar in appearance, but can be distinguished microscopically from Amylocystis lapponica by the lack of amyloid cystidia.

== Habitat and distribution ==
Amylocystis lapponica decomposes fallen conifer wood, in which it causes brown rot. Its preferential hosts are spruce and larch, although it is occasionally found on fir. It has a circumboreal distribution in coniferous forests. In Europe, the fungus is restricted almost exclusively to old-growth forests. Several conditions are required to support local populations, including: "vegetative continuity (never cut), natural tree species composition, multi-aged structure, rich presence of dead wood in various stages of decay, relatively large area of virgin forest surrounded by near-natural forest, and a stable, cold and humid meso- and microclimate." Because of this requirement the species is rare. For example, in the Czech Republic, despite the long and intensive history of polypore study in that area, A. lapponica has only been recorded from the Boubínský prales virgin forest, even though there are other old-growth forests in the country. Similarly, in Poland it is known only from Białowieża Forest (Białowieża National Park). Both the Czech and Polish locations have a similar management history–"minimal influence by man".

In contrast to its rarity in Central and Southern Europe, A. lapponica is known from hundreds of localities in Finland and Sweden, and dozens in Norway. Here the fungus is used as an indicator species to help evaluate areas in need of conservation. The fungus is widely distributed in western North America. It is also found in China.

In Europe, the fungus has been recorded from 12 countries, and is red-listed in 7 countries. In 2004, Amylocystis lapponica was one of 33 species proposed for protection under the Bern Convention by the European Council for Conservation of Fungi. In both the Czech Republic and Poland, where it is considered critically endangered, the fungus is found on their Regional Red Lists and as such is protected by law.

The discomycete Hyaloscypha epiporia grows only on the surface of old polypores fruiting on softwood, and is often found on old, partly decayed fruit bodies of Amylocystis lapponica.
