= Fibroporia albicans =

Scientific classification
- Domain: Eukaryota
- Kingdom: Fungi
- Division: Basidiomycota
- Class: Agaricomycetes
- Order: Polyporales
- Family: Fomitopsidaceae
- Genus: Fibroporia
- Species: F. albicans

Binomial name
- Fibroporia albicans B.K.Cui & Yuan Y.Chen (2015)

Species of fungus

Fibroporia albicans is a species of poroid crust fungus in the family Fomitopsidaceae. It causes a brown rot. The fungus was described in 2015 as a species new to science, based on collections made in Jiangxi and Xizang Provinces, China. It is one of five Fibroporia species recorded in China.

== Description ==
Fibroporia albicans is characterized by crust-like, annual fruit bodies with a white to cream-colored fresh pore surface that darkens to cream or cream-buff after drying. The pores are small, measuring 6–8 per millimeter, and there are white to cream rhizomorphs. Fibroporia albicans has a dimitic hyphal system with clamped generative hyphae, fuse-shaped cystidioles, and oblong to ellipsoid spores that measure 4–5.2 by 3–3.8 μm.
