= Dacryobolus gracilis =

Scientific classification
- Kingdom: Fungi
- Division: Basidiomycota
- Class: Agaricomycetes
- Order: Polyporales
- Family: Fomitopsidaceae
- Genus: Dacryobolus
- Species: D. gracilis

Binomial name
- Dacryobolus gracilis H.S.Yuan (2016)

Species of fungus

Dacryobolus gracilis is a species of crust fungus in the family Fomitopsidaceae. This brown rot fungus was described as new to science in 2016 by Hai-Sheng Yuan. It has a fragile, waxy fruit body with small, slender spines. The fungus has been found in Chongqing and Guangxi, in southwestern China.
