= Daedalea ryvardeniana =

Scientific classification
- Kingdom: Fungi
- Division: Basidiomycota
- Class: Agaricomycetes
- Order: Polyporales
- Family: Fomitopsidaceae
- Genus: Daedalea
- Species: D. ryvardeniana

Binomial name
- Daedalea ryvardeniana Drechsler-Santos & Robledo (2012)

Species of fungus

Daedalea ryvardeniana is a neotropical species of poroid fungus in the family Fomitopsidaceae. Found in Brazil, it was described as new to science in 2012.

== Taxonomy ==
The type collection was made in Chapada dos Guimarães National Park, in the state of Mato Grosso. The specific epithet honours polypore specialist Leif Ryvarden.

== Description ==
Morphological characteristics of this fungus include an irregular hymenophore, with relatively large pores numbering 1 to 3 per millimetre. The structure of the pore surface ranges from daedaloid (maze-like), to somewhat labyrinthic, to gill-like. This hymenophore irregularity helps distinguish it from the similar Daedalea stereoides. D. ryvardeniana also has larger spores, measuring 7.5–11.0 by 2.5–3.5 μm. The spores feature a unique central concavity next to the apiculum and a tapering tip. The fungus has a dimitic hyphal system, with thick-walled generative hyphae containing a winding lumen.

== Habitat and distribution ==
The fungus, a saprophyte, grows on logs and fallen branches of angiosperms, in which it causes brown rot. It is found in dry and somewhat xerophytic areas in Caatinga and Cerrado ecosystems located in Ceará, Paraíba, and Pernambuco States. It was later recorded in the Caatinga area of Bahia.
