= Fibroporia bohemica =

Scientific classification
- Domain: Eukaryota
- Kingdom: Fungi
- Division: Basidiomycota
- Class: Agaricomycetes
- Order: Polyporales
- Family: Fomitopsidaceae
- Genus: Fibroporia
- Species: F. bohemica

Binomial name
- Fibroporia bohemica Bernicchia, Vampola & Prodi (2012)

Species of fungus

Fibroporia bohemica is a species of poroid crust fungus in the family Fomitopsidaceae.

== Taxonomy ==
The fungus was described as new to science in 2012 by mycologists Annarosa Bernicchia, Petr Vampola, and Antonio Prodi after it was confirmed that it was morphologically and genetically distinct from the similar North American species Fibroporia radiculosa. The specific epithet bohemia references Bohemia, where the type specimen was collected.

== Description ==
Fruit bodies of Fibroporia bohemica grow as an irregular crust on their substrate. They are initially smooth and whitish to slightly pinkish, sometimes with sulphur-yellow colouration on the vertical surface. The tubes, which are formed later, are up to 6 mm long and yellow. The round to angular pores number 2–4 per millimetre. Numerous rhizomorphs surround the crust, and penetrate deep into the substrate; they are most abundant on old fruit bodies growing on very decayed wood. The odour of the fungus has been described as "strong and unpleasant".

The spores of F. bohemica are hyaline, smooth, and ellipsoid to somewhat cylindrical in shape. They typically measure 5–5.5 by 2.8–3 μm. The fungus has a dimitic hyphal system, with thin-walled, richly branched generative hyphae with clamps at septa, measuring 2–4.5 μm in diameter. The skeletal hyphae, measuring 3–6 μm in diameter, are thick-walled, and unbranched or only moderately so.

== Habitat and distribution ==
Found in central European coniferous forests, F. bohemica causes a brown rot on stumps of Norway spruce, or, more rarely, on Scots pine.
