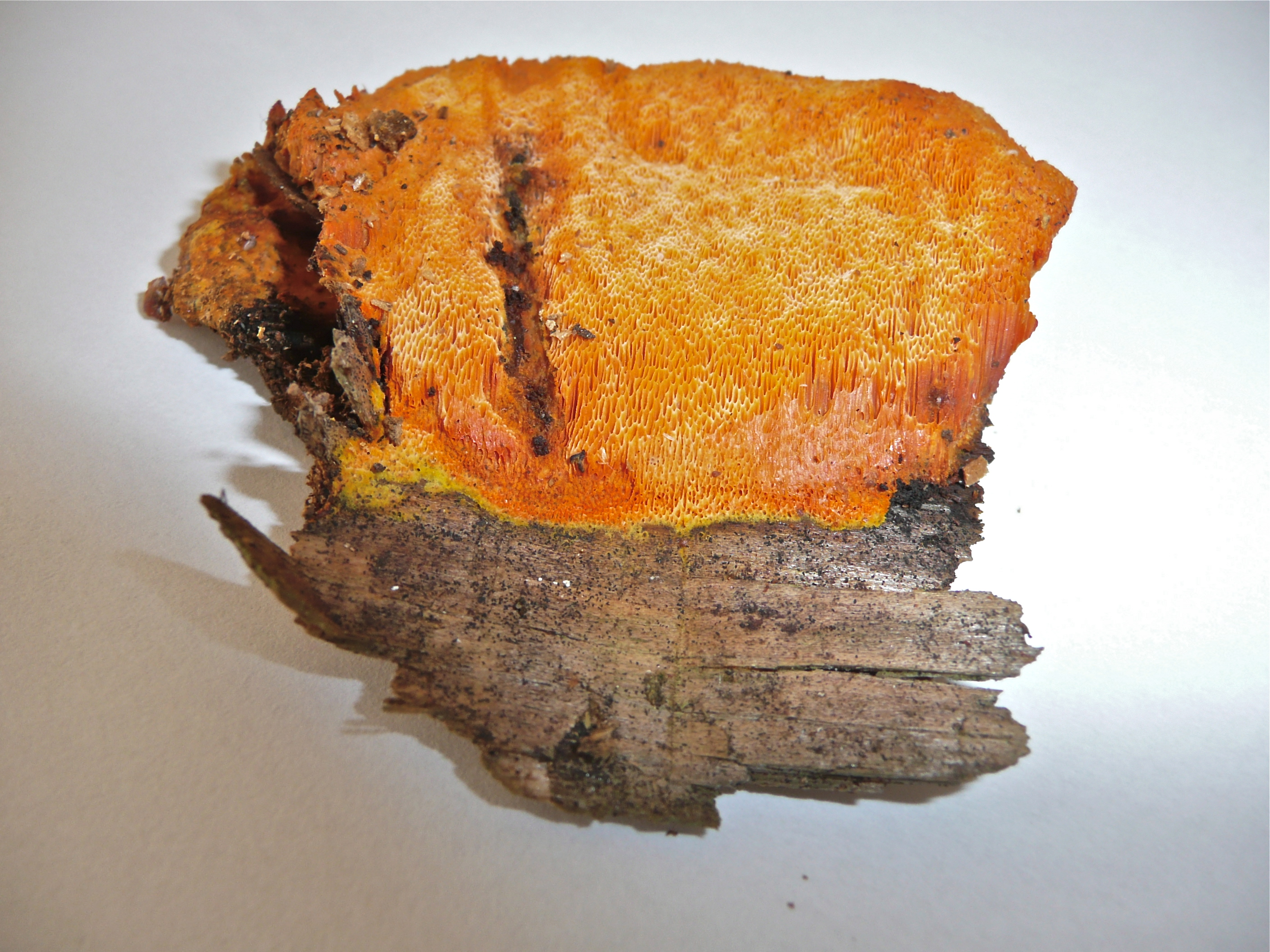

Scientific classification
- Kingdom: Fungi
- Division: Basidiomycota
- Class: Agaricomycetes
- Order: Polyporales
- Family: Fomitopsidaceae
- Genus: Auriporia
- Species: A. aurulenta

Binomial name
- Auriporia aurulenta A.David, Tortic & Jelic (1975)

= Auriporia aurulenta =

Species of crust fungus

Auriporia aurulenta is a rare species of fungus that forms bright orange-yellow crusts on decaying conifer wood in old-growth forests. First described as a new species in 1974, this distinctive organism can be recognised by its golden colour (which fades to ochre with age), its pleasant almond-like scent that persists even in dried specimens, and its tendency to spread across rotting wood in thin layers up to 20 centimetres wide. The species name aurulenta refers to its golden appearance when fresh. Though uncommon throughout its range, this fungus has been documented in several European countries including Austria, France, Germany, Switzerland, and Ukraine, as well as in parts of East Asia such as Japan and Korea. Due to its specific habitat requirements in undisturbed, mossy conifer forests, A. aurulenta appears on Regional Red Lists of threatened fungi.

== Taxonomy ==
Auriporia aurulenta was first described as a new species in 1974 by Alain David and colleagues. The species name aurulenta means "golden", referring to the fresh pore surface, which is bright orange-yellow. The fungus is recognized in the field by its deep orange-yellow colour that becomes ochre in age.

== Description ==
Auriporia aurulenta forms effused (spread out) crusts on dead conifer wood. The fruit bodies can spread up to 10–20 cm across and about 2–5 mm thick. When fresh, the pore surface is vivid orange to golden and the margin is fimbriate (fringed) and sterile. Over time the colour dulls to ochre. The pores are small (2–3 per mm) and round, and the tube layer is the same colour as surface. The context is soft and pale. Older specimens often develop a cracked, wrinkled (rugose) surface. A distinctive feature is the pleasant almond smell of fresh specimens, which can persist in dried herbarium material. Under the microscope, Auriporia aurulenta has a dimitic hyphal system (generative hyphae with clamps and skeletal hyphae) and conspicuous encrusted cystidia.

== Habitat and distribution ==
This fungus is rare and localized in temperate Europe, where it occurs in Austria, Czechoslovakia, France, Yugoslavia, South Germany, Switzerland, and Ukraine. In East Asia, it has been recorded from Japan and Koreas. It is a lignicolous saprotroph primarily in old-growth conifer forests. Auriporia aurulenta grows on decaying trunks of spruce (Picea) and other conifers. It was originally recorded from Eastern Europe (Ukraine) and Central Europe. By the 1980s it was known from only a few countries – former Czechoslovakia being the fifth country record. Other recorded habitats include virgin spruce forests in Czech Republic (Moravia), alpine conifer woods in Switzerland, and montane forests in Germany and France. It has also been found in Ukraine and former Yugoslavia. Due to its specific habitat requirements (undisturbed, mossy conifer stands), A. aurulenta is considered rare throughout its range and is included on Regional Red Lists of threatened fungi.
