= Buglossoporus magnus =

Conservation status
- Vulnerable (IUCN 3.1)

Scientific classification
- Kingdom: Fungi
- Division: Basidiomycota
- Class: Agaricomycetes
- Order: Polyporales
- Family: Fomitopsidaceae
- Genus: Buglossoporus
- Species: B. magnus

Binomial name
- Buglossoporus magnus Corner (1984)

Species of fungus

Buglossoporus magnus is a rare species of poroid fungus in the family Fomitopsidaceae. Recorded from only three locations in old growth lowland rainforest of Peninsular Malaysia, it is considered a vulnerable species by the IUCN.

The large, orange-pinkish fruit bodies of the fungus–measuring 60 cm (24 in) wide–were discovered by British mycologist E.J.H. Corner. He noted "I met this massive fungus but once, on a large, slowly decomposing, fallen trunk that I had often passed by in previous years." The holotype specimen was found in a forest reserve in Bukit Timah, Singapore. Although the original observation of the fungus is dated to 1940, it was not officially described as a new species until 1984.

== See also ==
- List of fungi by conservation status
- Largest fungal fruit bodies
