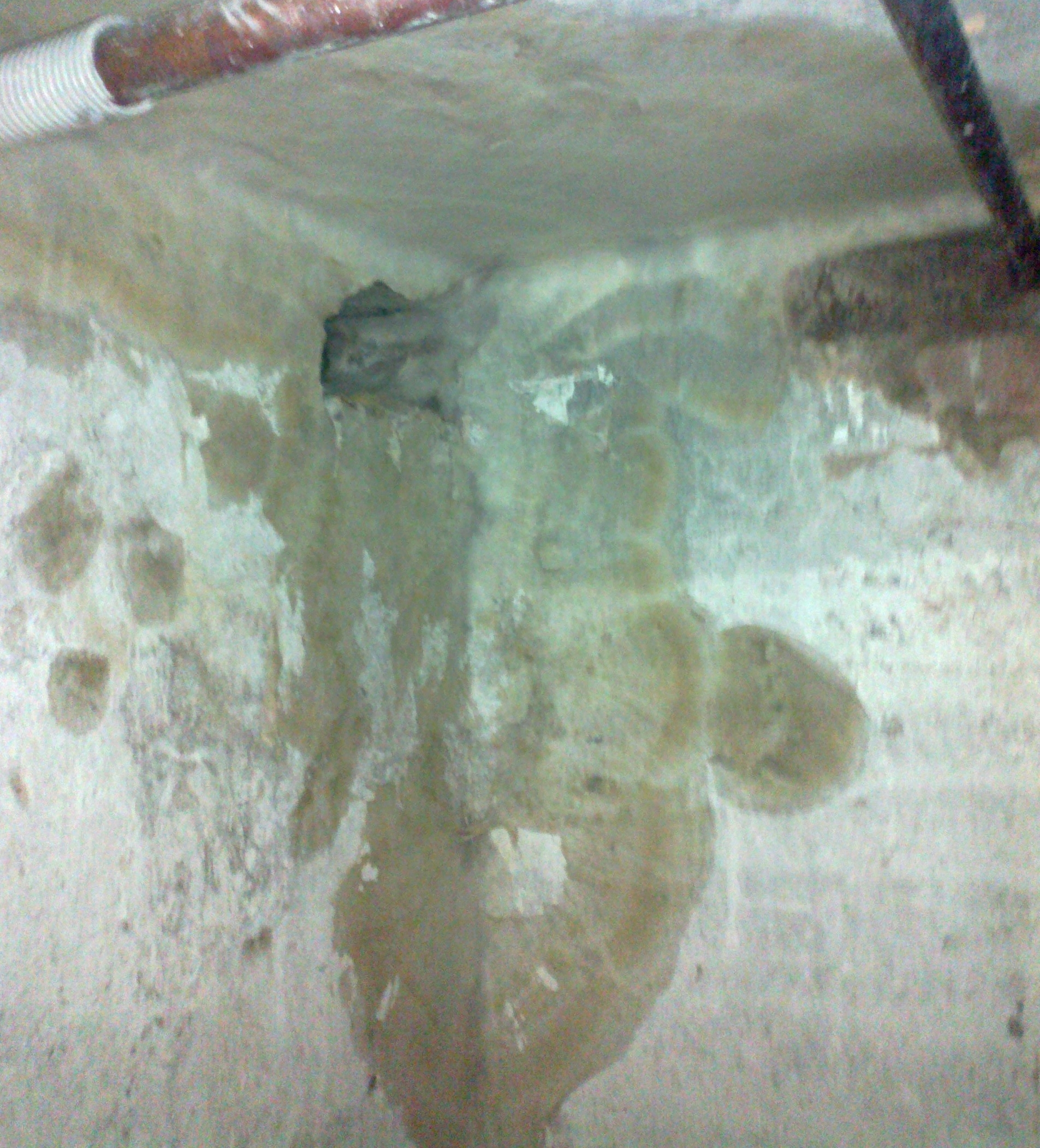
- Growing on plaster in an abandoned house

Scientific classification
- Kingdom: Fungi
- Division: Basidiomycota
- Class: Agaricomycetes
- Order: Polyporales
- Family: Fomitopsidaceae
- Genus: Fibroporia
- Species: F. vaillantii

Binomial name
- Fibroporia vaillantii (DC.) Parmasto (1968)

Synonyms
- Boletus vaillantii DC. (1815); Polyporus vaillantii (DC.) Fr. (1821)

= Fibroporia vaillantii =

Species of fungus

Fibroporia vaillantii, also known as mine fungus, white pore fungus, Antrodia vaillantii, Polyporus vaillantii, and various other names is a wood-decaying fungus which can occur on timber in humid conditions. The fungus causes brown rot of pine wood, in which cellulose and hemicellulose are broken down, leading to brown discoloration and shrinkage of wood.

== Description ==
The fungus grows on wood from coniferous trees, such as pine wood, under damp conditions, with a wood moisture content of 40 to 50 percent. In humid atmospheres, the white cotton-like mycelium can grow on wood surfaces and cross inert materials. In newly grown mycelium, fine drops of clear liquid may be present. The optimal temperature for growth is 28 °C (82 °F); it will grow at temperatures between 3 and 36 °C (37 and 97 °F). The fruit body is an irregular white plate with a thickness of 2 to 12 mm.
