= Ungulidaedalea =

Scientific classification
- Kingdom: Fungi
- Division: Basidiomycota
- Class: Agaricomycetes
- Order: Polyporales
- Family: Fomitopsidaceae
- Genus: Ungulidaedalea; B.K.Cui, M.L.Han & Y.C.Dai (2016)

Type species
- Ungulidaedalea fragilis (B.K.Cui & M.L.Han) B.K.Cui, M.L.Han & Y.C.Dai (2016)

Synonyms
- Fomitopsis fragilis B.K.Cui & M.L.Han (2014)

Genus of fungi

Ungulidaedalea is a fungal genus in the family Fomitopsidaceae. The genus was circumscribed by Chinese mycologists in 2016 to contain the single species Ungulidaedalea fragilis, a fungus that was described as new in 2014 with the name Fomitopsis fragilis. The holotype of this fungus was collected in Jianfengling Nature Reserve, in Ledong County (Hainan). The generic name Ungulidaedalea refers to the resemblance between this species and Daedalea, and also to the hoof-shaped (ungulate) form of the fruit body. Ungulidaedalea fragilis has rather fragile fruit bodies with a dark brown crust and large angular pores (numbering 1–2 per millimetre) on the cap underside. Microscopic characteristics include its densely septated skeletal hyphae, and oblong-ellipsoid spores that measure 4–5.2 by 2.2–2.8 μm.
