= Auriporia brasilica =

Scientific classification
- Domain: Eukaryota
- Kingdom: Fungi
- Division: Basidiomycota
- Class: Agaricomycetes
- Order: Polyporales
- Family: Fomitopsidaceae
- Genus: Auriporia
- Species: A. brasilica

Binomial name
- Auriporia brasilica G.Coelho (2005)

Species of fungus

Auriporia brasilica is a species of poroid fungus. Found in South America, it was described as new to science in 2005 by Gilberto Coelho. The type was collected in Camobi, in the Brazilian state of Rio Grande do Sul, where it was found growing on a decayed branch of the native tree Luehea divaricata.
