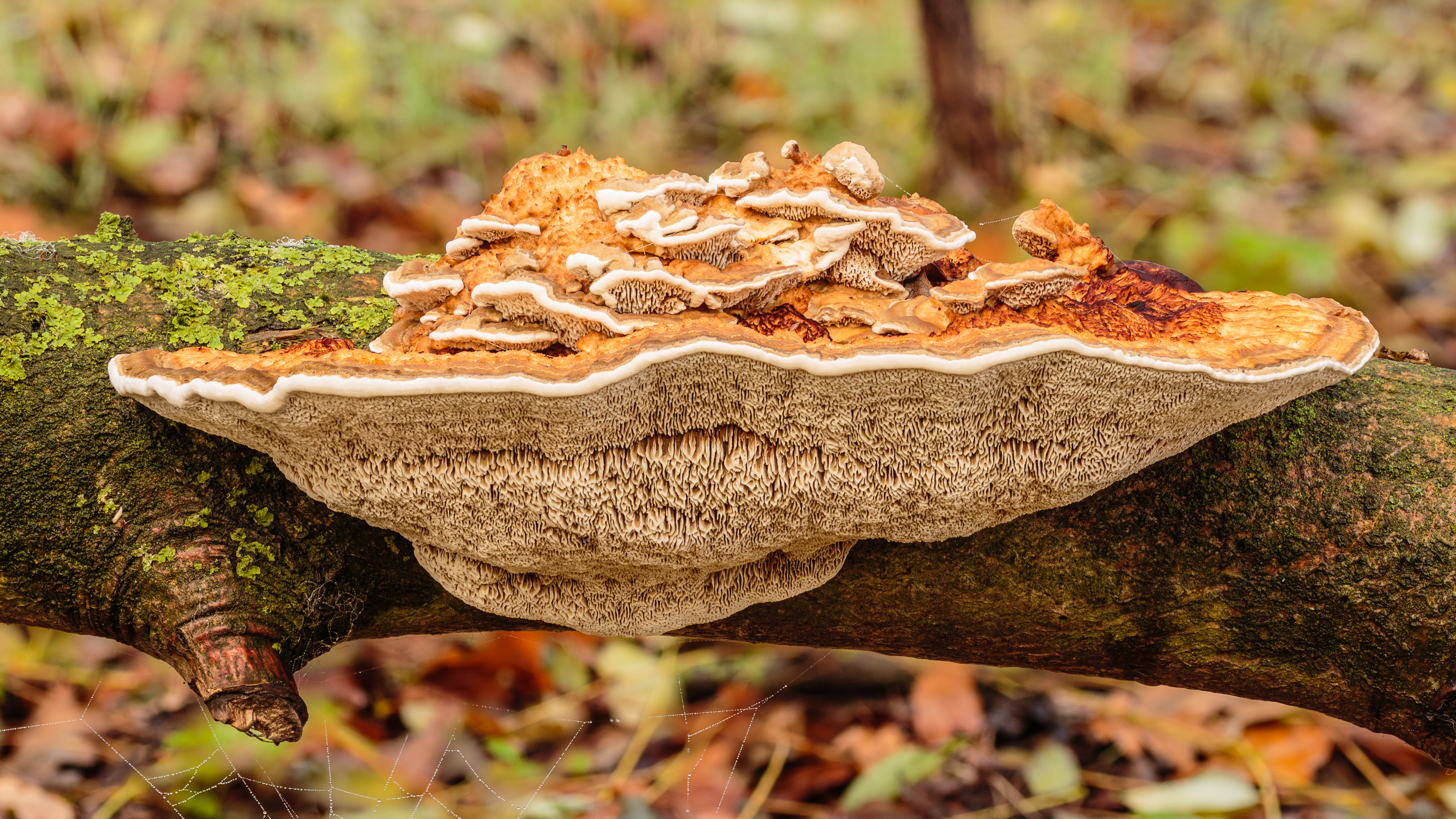
- The maze-like pores of Fomitopsis quercina

Scientific classification
- Kingdom: Fungi
- Division: Basidiomycota
- Class: Agaricomycetes
- Order: Polyporales
- Family: Fomitopsidaceae
- Genus: Fomitopsis
- Species: F. quercina

Binomial name
- Fomitopsis quercina (L.) V. Spirin & O. Miettinen

Synonyms
- List: Agaricus quercinus L.; Daedalea quercina (L.) Pers.; Lenzites quercina (L.) P. Karst.; Merulius quercinus (L.) J.F. Gmel.; Striglia quercina (L.) Kuntze; Agaricus labyrinthiformis Bull.; Trametes quercina (L.) Pilát; Daedaleites quercinus (L.) Mesch.; Agaricus quercinus Scop.

= Fomitopsis quercina =

Species of fungus

Fomitopsis quercina is a species of mushroom in the order Polyporales. Commonly known as the thick-walled maze polypore, maze-gill fungus, oak-loving maze polypore, or oak mazegill, the specific epithet refers to the oak genus Quercus, upon which it frequently grows, causing a brown rot. It is found in Eurasia, Northern Africa and Australasia. Though inedible, it can be used as a natural comb and has been the subject of chemical research.

== Taxonomy ==
Having previously been in the genus Daedalea, it was transferred to the new genus Fomitopsis in 2024, based on molecular phylogenetic data. The newly proposed name is Fomitopsis quercina (L.) Spirin & Miettinen (2024).

== Description ==
The sessile, fan-shaped fruiting bodies are typically 3–20 centimetres (1–8 in) wide and up to 8 cm thick. They are found singly or in tiered groups, usually on rotting oak. The upper surface of the cap may be various shades of brown, and is sometimes zonate. The pore surface, white to tan in color, is initially porous, but as the fruit body matures, some of the pore walls break down, forming slits with blunt partitions. This results in the characteristic maze-like (daedaloid or labyrinthine or labyrinthiform) appearance. The tube walls are 10–30 mm (0.39–1.18 in) long, with thick walls. The basidiospores are 5–7 × 2–4 μm, smooth, and elliptical in shape. In deposit the spores are white.

A variant has been described that has large, angular pores similar to those in the genus Trametes, named F. quercina forma trametea.

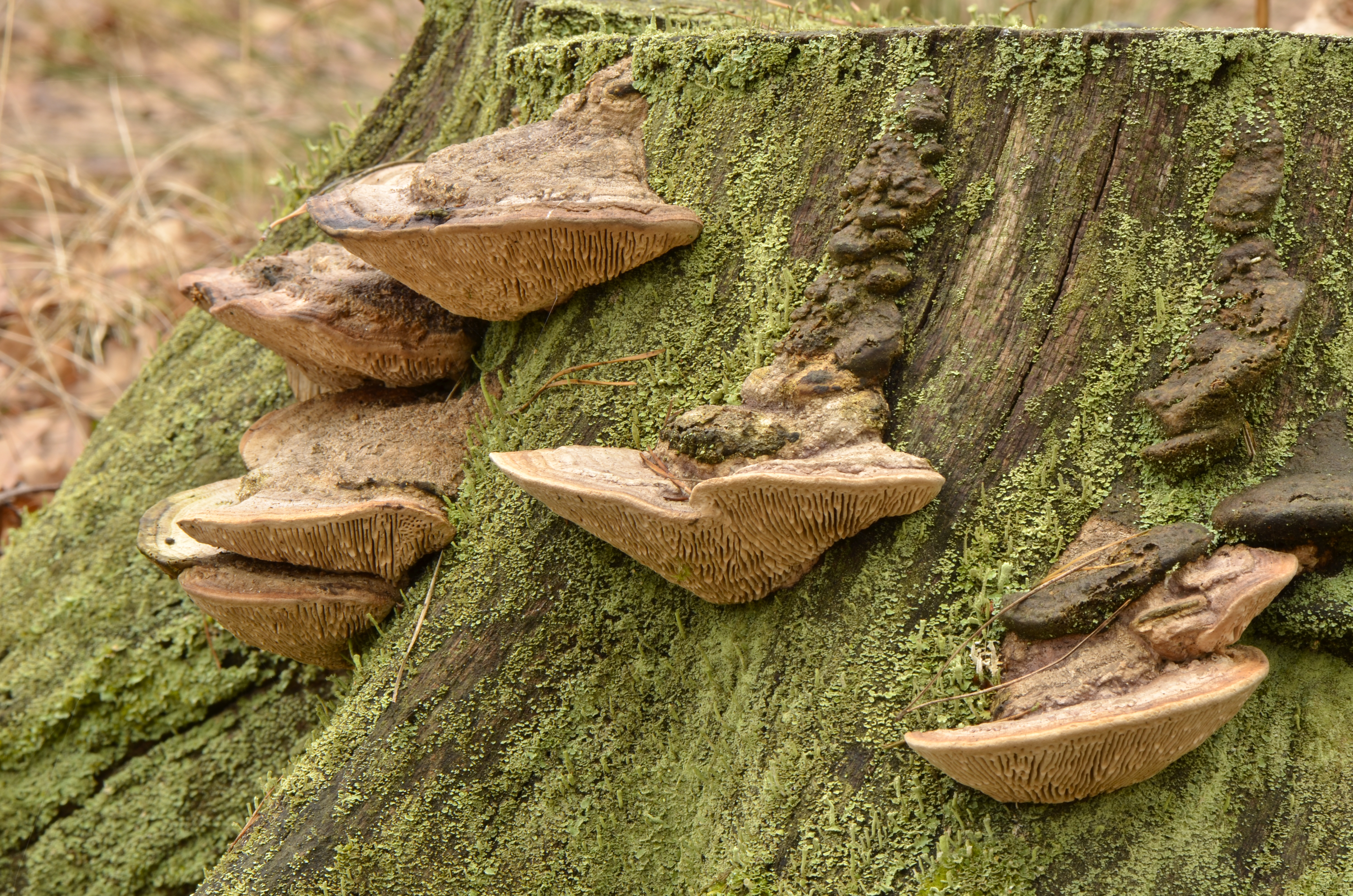
Fruit bodies on ecorticated stump

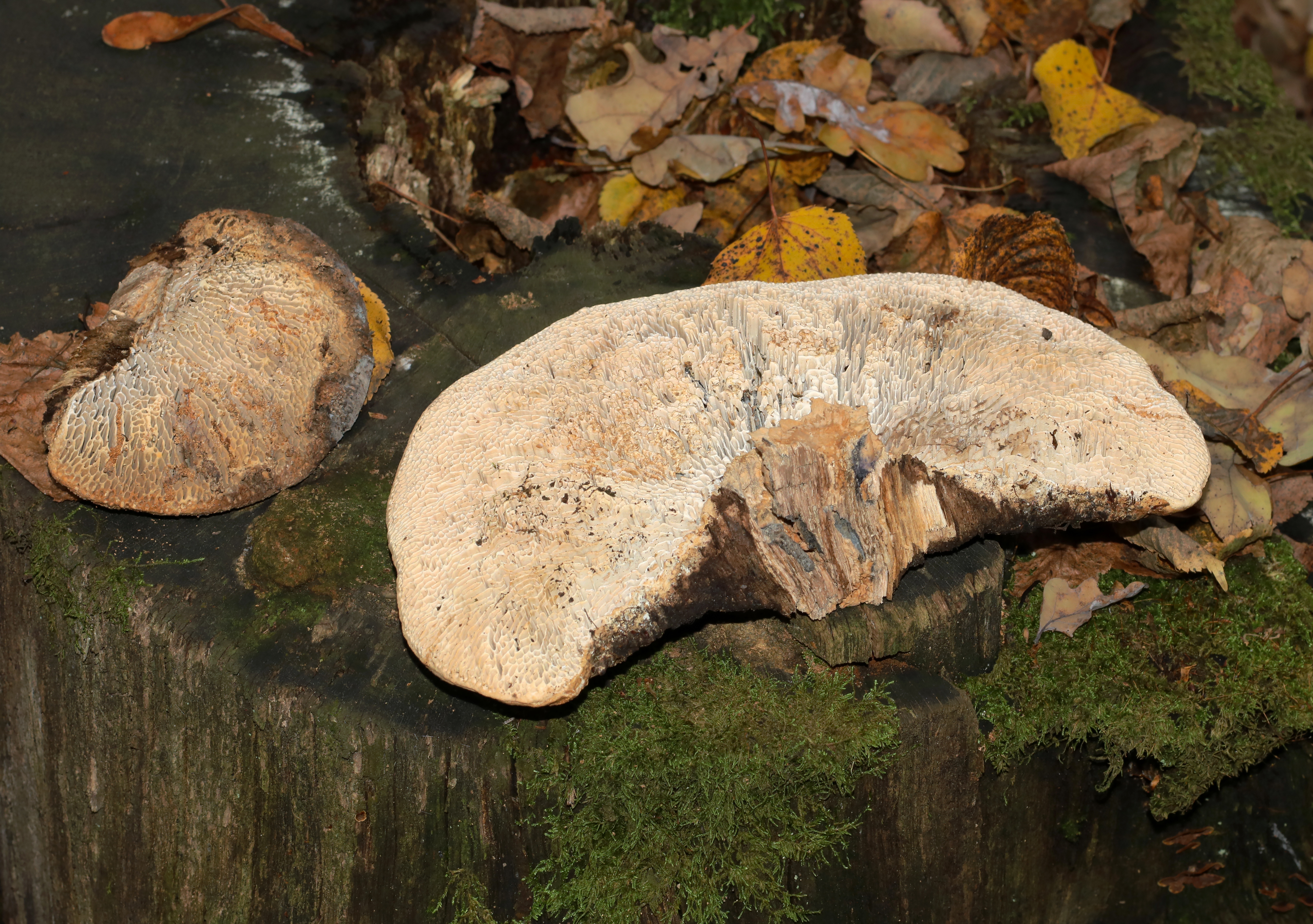
Bottom side with the pore surface

== Habitat and distribution ==
Although Fomitopsis quercina prefers to grow on Quercus species, it has also been found on the tree species Fagus grandifolia, Fraxinus americana, Juglans nigra, and Ulmus americana.

It has been reported from nearly all European countries, following the pattern of oak distribution. It has also been reported in Northern Africa, North America, (Tunisia), Asia from Caucasus to India, and also Australia.

== Uses ==
The fruit bodies have been used as a natural comb and aphrodisiac, employed for brushing down horses with tender skin. Gilbertson notes that in England, smoldering fruit bodies were used for anesthetizing bees.

This species has been investigated for application in bioremediation. The lignin-degrading enzyme laccase, isolated and purified from F. quercina, has shown use in biodegrading a variety of toxic dyes and pigments.

The compound quercinol (a chromene derivative), isolated from the oak mazegill, has anti-inflammatory activity, and inhibits the enzymes cyclooxygenase-2, xanthine oxidase, and horseradish peroxidase.

The mushroom is inedible due to its toughness.
