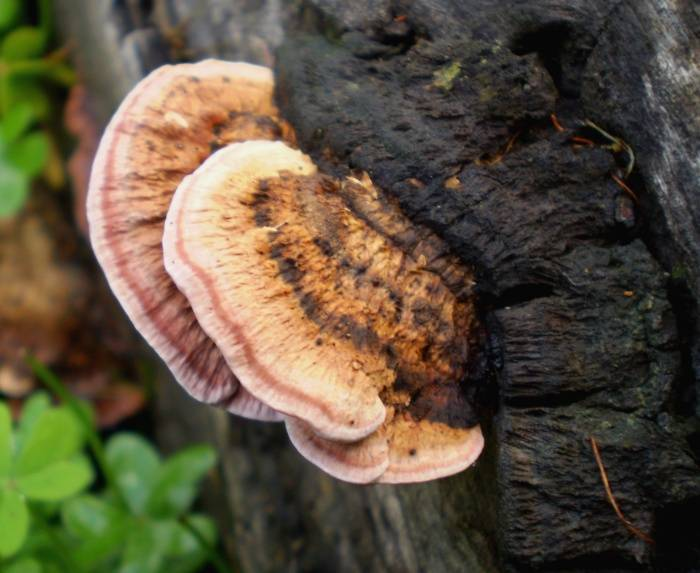

Scientific classification
- Kingdom: Fungi
- Division: Basidiomycota
- Class: Agaricomycetes
- Order: Polyporales
- Family: Fomitopsidaceae
- Genus: Rhodofomitopsis
- Species: R. lilacinogilva

Binomial name
- Rhodofomitopsis lilacinogilva (Berk.) B.K.Cui, M.L.Han & Y.C.Dai (2016)

Synonyms
- Polyporus lilacinogilvus Berk. (1839); Polystictus lilacinogilvus (Berk.) Cooke (1886); Microporus lilacinogilvus (Berk.) Kuntze (1898); Trametes lilacinogilva (Berk.) Lloyd (1915); Fomitopsis lilacinogilva (Berk.) J.E.Wright & J.R.Deschamps (1975)

= Rhodofomitopsis lilacinogilva =

Species of fungus

Rhodofomitopsis lilacinogilva is a species of bracket fungus in the family Fomitopsidaceae. Known primarily from Australia, it has also been recorded from Brazil and India. It is a white-rot fungus that grows on rotting eucalyptus wood. Its main identifying feature is the lilac colour of the pore surface on the underside of the fruit body.

== Taxonomy ==
The fungus was originally described by Miles Joseph Berkeley in 1839, who called it Polyporus lilacino-gilvus. The type specimen was found growing on charred wood in Van Diemen's Land (now Tasmania). and sent to Berkeley through botanist Sir William Jackson Hooker, who was sent the specimens from collections made by Ronald Campbell Gunn. Berkeley considered the fungus to be allied with Polyporus gilvus, a species now known as Phellinus gilvus and classified in the Hymenochaetaceae. Mycologists have juggled the fungus to several different polypore genera in its taxonomic history: Mordecai Cubitt Cooke to genus Polystictus in 1886; Otto Kuntze to Microporus in 1898; Curtis Gates Lloyd to Trametes in 1915; and Jorge Eduardo Wright and J.R.Deschamps to Fomitopsis in 1975. Chinese mycologists transferred the species to the newly created genus Rhodofomitopsis in 2016.

== Description ==
The fungus produces shelf-like fruit bodies, usually 3–10 cm (1–4 in) in diameter, attached directly to the substrate without a stipe. The caps have concentrically ridged surfaces, and are brown with lilac tints. The lilac-coloured surface of the cap underside has 4–5 pores per millimetre. The spore print is white; spores are smooth, ellipsoid, and measure 6–9 by 2–3 μm.

== Habitat and distribution ==
Rhodofomitopsis lilacinogilva is known primarily in Australia, where it is widely distributed, having been reported from Queensland, New South Wales, Victoria, Tasmania, South Australia, Western Australia, and Northern Territory. The fungus was reported from India for the first time in 2009, and from Brazil in 2015. Although not native to Europe, it was reported as an exotic species growing on imported eucalyptus wood sheet piling in a new housing estate in Groningen.
