= Daedalea circularis =

Scientific classification
- Domain: Eukaryota
- Kingdom: Fungi
- Division: Basidiomycota
- Class: Agaricomycetes
- Order: Polyporales
- Family: Fomitopsidaceae
- Genus: Daedalea
- Species: D. circularis

Binomial name
- Daedalea circularis B.K.Cui & Hai J.Li (2013)

Fungus in the genus Daedalea

Daedalea circularis is a species of mushroom in the order Polyporales.
