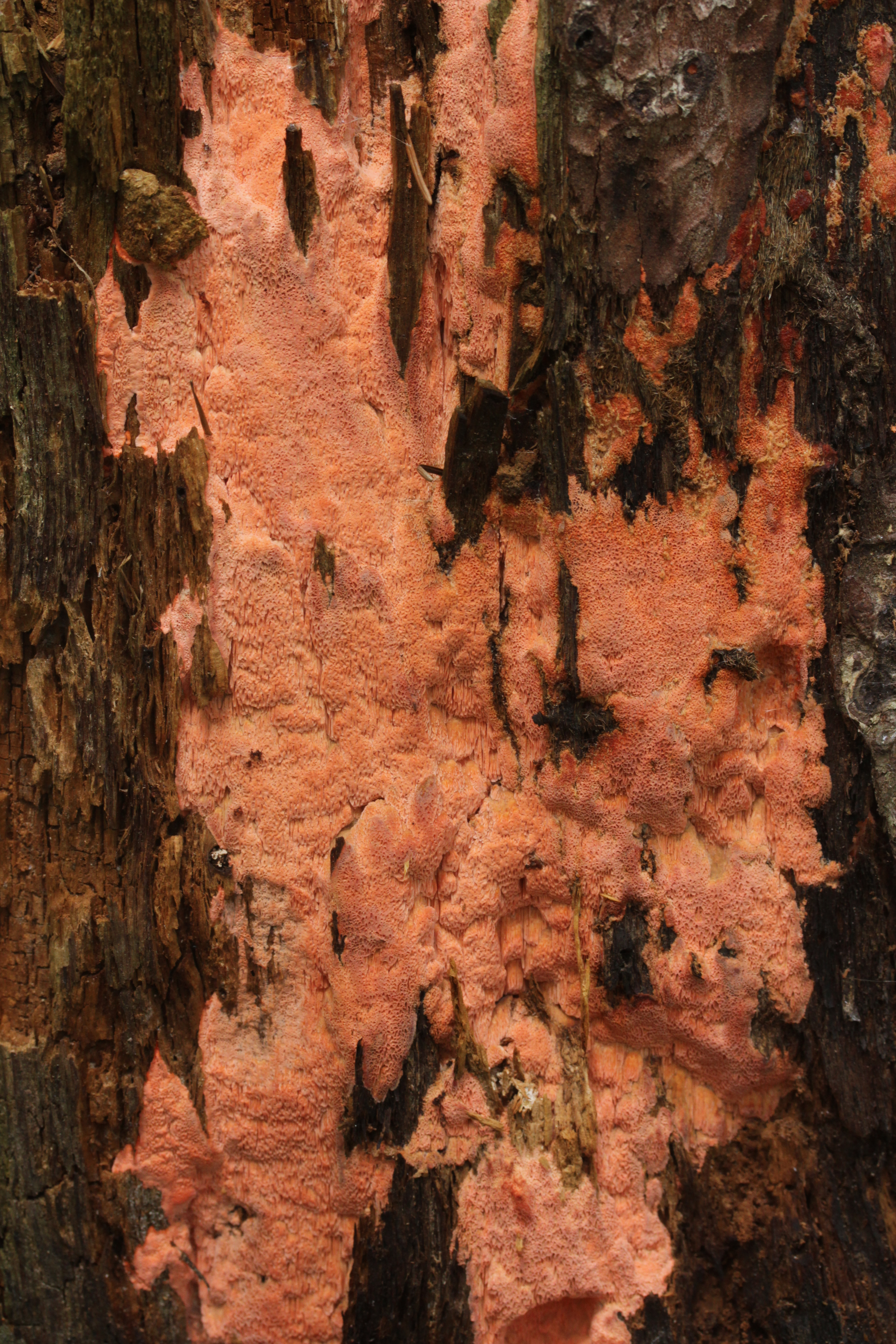

Scientific classification
- Domain: Eukaryota
- Kingdom: Fungi
- Division: Basidiomycota
- Class: Agaricomycetes
- Order: Polyporales
- Family: Fomitopsidaceae
- Genus: Rhodonia
- Species: R. placenta

Binomial name
- Rhodonia placenta (Fr.) Niemelä, K.H.Larss. & Schigel (2005)

Synonyms
- List: Polyporus placenta Fr. (1861); Physisporus placenta (Fr.) P. Karst. (1882); Poria placenta (Fr.) Cooke (1886); Leptoporus placenta (Fr.) Pat. (1900); Ceriporiopsis placenta (Fr.) Domański (1963); Tyromyces placenta (Fr.) Ryvarden (1973); Oligoporus placenta (Fr.) Gilb. & Ryvarden (1985); Postia placenta (Fr.) M.J. Larsen & Lombard (1986); Poria incarnata Pers. (1794); Boletus incarnatus (Pers.) Pers. (1801); Polyporus incarnatus (Pers.) Fr. (1821); Physisporus incarnatus (Pers.) Gillet (1878); Caloporus incarnatus (Pers.) P.Karst. (1881); Caloporia incarnata (Pers.) P.Karst. (1898); Ceriporia incarnata (Pers.) Bondartsev (1953); Bjerkandera roseomaculata P.Karst. (1891); Polyporus roseomaculatus (P.Karst.) Sacc. (1895); Ceriporiopsis placenta f. roseomaculata (P.Karst.) Domański (1965); Physisporus albolilacinus P.Karst. (1892); Poria albolilacina (P.Karst.) Sacc. (1895); Poria monticola Murrill (1920); Poria placenta f. monticola (Murrill) Domański (1972); Poria carnicolor D.V.Baxter (1941); Poria microspora Overh. (1943); Ceriporiopsis placenta f. microspora Domański (1965)

= Rhodonia placenta =

Genus of fungi

Rhodonia placenta is a species of crust fungus in the family Fomitopsidaceae. A brown rot species, it is found in China, Europe, and North America, where it grows on decaying conifer wood.

== Taxonomy ==
The species has undergone several changes in generic placement since it was originally described as a species in the genus Polyporus by Elias Magnus Fries in 1861. Although formerly placed in the genus Oligoporus or Postia, molecular analysis has revealed that this species is phylogenetically distant from species in those genera, appearing instead in a separate clade near Antrodia.

=== Synonymy ===
Rhodonia placenta has acquired an extensive synonymy in its taxonomic history. In addition to having been transferred to several polypore genera, it is considered to be the same species as Poria incarnata described by Christian Hendrik Persoon in 1794, as well as Petter Karsten's Bjerkandera roseomaculata (1891), and Physisporus albolilacinus (1892). Other taxonomic synonyms include William Alphonso Murrill's Poria monticola, Dow Baxter's Poria carnicolor (1941), and Lee Oras Overholts' Poria microspora (1943).

== Description ==
The fruiting body is spread out (effused) on its substrate, poroid, fairly thick, juicy and soft, with a pale rose or white colouring. It has a monomitic hyphal system (containing only generative hyphae), and the hyphae have clamp connections. These hyphae are initially thin-walled but become thick-walled in mature fruit bodies. The spores are cylindric.

== Sequencing ==
Rhodonia placenta had its sequenced genome published in 2009. It has an "unusual repertoire" of extracellular glycoside hydrolases—secreted enzymes that break down the complex sugars found in lignocellulose.
