= Buglossoporus eucalypticola =

Scientific classification
- Kingdom: Fungi
- Division: Basidiomycota
- Class: Agaricomycetes
- Order: Polyporales
- Family: Fomitopsidaceae
- Genus: Buglossoporus
- Species: B. eucalypticola

Binomial name
- Buglossoporus eucalypticola M.L.Han, B.K.Cui & Y.C.Dai (2016)

Species of fungus

Buglossoporus eucalypticola is a species of poroid fungus in the family Fomitopsidaceae. It was described as a new species in 2016 by mycologists Mei-Ling Han, Bao-Kai Cui, and Yu-Cheng Dai. The type specimen was collected in the Danzhou Tropical Botanical Garden, in Danzhou, China. It was growing on a dead Eucalyptus tree. The fruit body has a fan-shaped or semicircular cap that projects up to 10 cm (3.9 in), 6.5 cm (2.6 in) wide, and 7 mm (0.3 in) thick at its base. The surface colour when fresh is peach to brownish orange, but when dry becomes clay-pink to cinnamon. The pore surface on the cap underside is initially white before becoming pinkish buff or clay-buff to dark brown. B. eucalypticola causes a brown rot in its host.
