= Auriporia aurea =

Scientific classification
- Domain: Eukaryota
- Kingdom: Fungi
- Division: Basidiomycota
- Class: Agaricomycetes
- Order: Polyporales
- Family: Fomitopsidaceae
- Genus: Auriporia
- Species: A. aurea

Binomial name
- Auriporia aurea (Peck) Ryvarden (1973)

Synonyms
- Poria aurea Peck (1890); Leptoporus aureus (Peck) Pat. (1900); Chaetoporellus aureus (Peck) Bondartsev (1953)

Species of fungus

Auriporia aurea is a species of poroid fungus. It was first described scientifically by Charles Horton Peck in 1890 as Poria aurea. Leif Ryvarden transferred it to the new genus Auriporia, in which it is the type species.
