= Auriporia pileata =

Scientific classification
- Kingdom: Fungi
- Division: Basidiomycota
- Class: Agaricomycetes
- Order: Polyporales
- Family: Fomitopsidaceae
- Genus: Auriporia
- Species: A. pileata

Binomial name
- Auriporia pileata Parmasto (1980)

Species of fungus

Auriporia pileata is a species of poroid fungus. Found in East Asia, it was described as a new species in 1980 by the Estonian mycologist Erast Parmasto.
