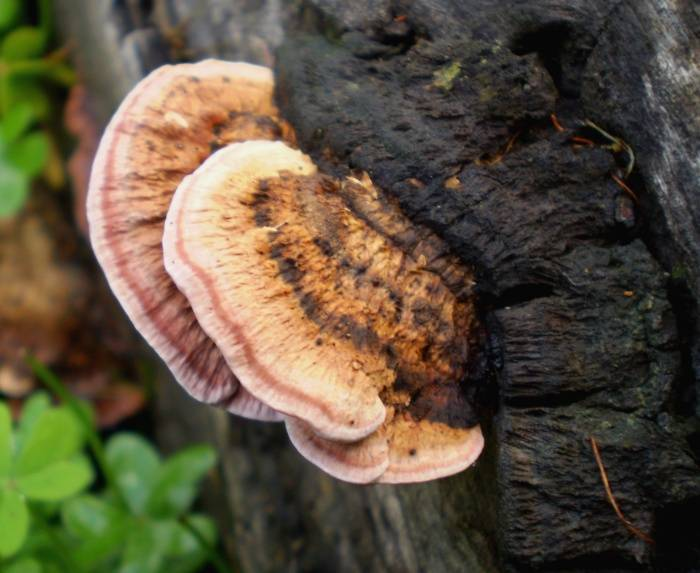
- Rhodofomitopsis lilacinogilva

Scientific classification
- Kingdom: Fungi
- Division: Basidiomycota
- Class: Agaricomycetes
- Order: Polyporales
- Family: Fomitopsidaceae
- Genus: Rhodofomitopsis; B.K.Cui, M.L.Han & Y.C.Dai (2016)

Type species
- Rhodofomitopsis feei (Fr.) B.K.Cui, M.L.Han, & Y.C.Dai (2016)

Species
- R. africana R. cupreorosea R. feei R. lilacinogilva R. roseomagna

= Rhodofomitopsis =

Genus of fungi

Rhodofomitopsis is a genus of four species of poroid fungi in the family Fomitopsidaceae. It was circumscribed by Chinese mycologists in 2016, with Rhodofomitopsis feei as the type species. Rhodofomitopsis is a distinct lineage of fungi that were previously placed in genus Fomitopsis. The generic name alludes to this resemblance to Fomitopsis and the violaceous pore surface.

== Description ==
Fruit bodies of Rhodofomitopsis fungi are annual to perennial. They usually lack a stipe, and have an initially leathery texture that becomes woody and hard when dry. The cap surface ranges in colour from straw, tan, brownish pink, rosy brown to blackish brown. The surface is velvety or smooth, slightly zonate, with weakly or strongly parallel grooves, and most have strongly radial streaks. Pore surface colour varies: rose, lilac, violaceous, pinkish-brown, or dirty brown have been reported. The pore shape varies from round to angular, or variations thereof. The hyphal system is dimitic (containing generative and skeletal hyphae). The skeletal hyphae are usually branched, and the generative hyphae have clamp connections. Cystidia are absent from the hymenium. The spores are cylindrical, ellipsoid or navicular (boat-shaped), hyaline (translucent), thin-walled, and smooth. Rhodofomitopsis fungi cause a brown rot on angiosperm wood.

== Species ==
- Rhodofomitopsis africana (Mossebo & Ryvarden) B.K.Cui, M.L.Han & Y.C.Dai (2016) – Cameroon
- Rhodofomitopsis cupreorosea (Berk.) B.K.Cui, M.L.Han & Y.C.Dai (2016) – Brazil; Belize
- Rhodofomitopsis feei (Fr.) B.K.Cui, M.L.Han & Y.C.Dai (2016) – Australia; Mexico; South America
- Rhodofomitopsis lilacinogilva (Berk.) B.K.Cui, M.L.Han & Y.C.Dai (2016) – Australia; Argentina
- Rhodofomitopsis roseomagna – Brazil
