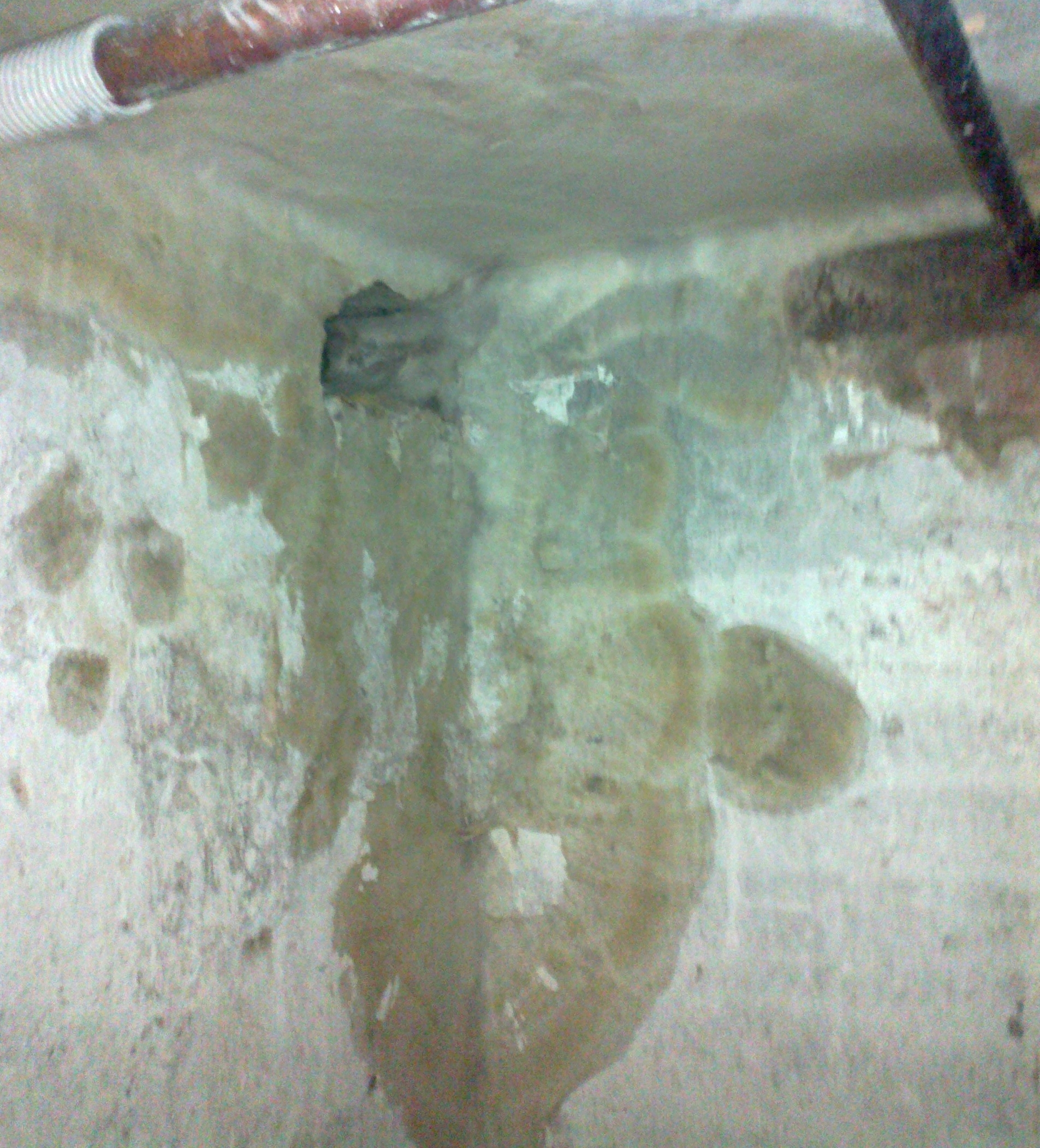
- Fibroporia vaillantii growing on plaster in an abandoned house

Scientific classification
- Kingdom: Fungi
- Division: Basidiomycota
- Class: Agaricomycetes
- Order: Polyporales
- Family: Fomitopsidaceae
- Genus: Fibroporia; Parmasto (1968)

Type species
- Fibroporia vaillantii (DC.) Parmasto (1968)

Species
- F. albicans F. bohemica F. citrina F. destructor F. norrlandica F. pseudorennyi F. radiculosa F. vaillantii

= Fibroporia =

Genus of fungi

Fibroporia is a genus of ten species of poroid crust fungi in the family Fomitopsidaceae. The genus contains species similar to those in genus Antrodia, but they are phylogenetically distinct.

== Taxonomy ==
The genus was circumscribed in 1968 by Estonian mycologist Erast Parmasto with Fibroporia vaillantii (formerly Polyporus vaillantii DC.) as the type species. He defined the genus as containing species with fimbriate (hairlike) to rhizomorphic margins, and ellipsoid to slightly thick-walled spores. In 1991, Leif Ryvarden did not consider the rhizomorphs to be a characteristic worthy of creating a separate genus, and proposed Fibroporia to be synonymous with Antrodia. Several molecular studies support the separation of Fibroporia as a distinct genus from Antrodia.

Pseudofibroporia is a phylogenetically related genus circumscribed by Chinese scientists in 2017. It is distinguished from Fibroporia by its distinct pileate fruit bodies that have entire margins (without notches or indentations) and the lack of rhizomorphs.

== Ecology ==
Wooden stakes decayed by Fibroporia radiculosa were shown to have a deterrent effect on the termite Reticulitermes speratus in a 2016 Japanese study.

== Species ==
- Fibroporia albicans B.K.Cui & Yuan Y.Chen (2015)
- Fibroporia bambusae Yuan Y.Chen, B.K.Cui & Y.C.Dai (2017) – China
- Fibroporia bohemica Bernicchia, Vampola & Prodi (2012) – Europe
- Fibroporia ceracea Yuan Y.Chen, B.K.Cui & Y.C.Dai (2017) – China
- Fibroporia citrina (Bernicchia & Ryvarden) Bernicchia & Ryvarden (2012)
- Fibroporia destructor (Schrad.) Parmasto (1968)
- Fibroporia norrlandica (Berglund & Ryvarden) Niemelä (2001)
- Fibroporia pseudorennyi (Spirin) Spirin (2007)
- Fibroporia radiculosa (Peck) Parmasto (1968)
- Fibroporia vaillantii (DC.) Parmasto (1968)
