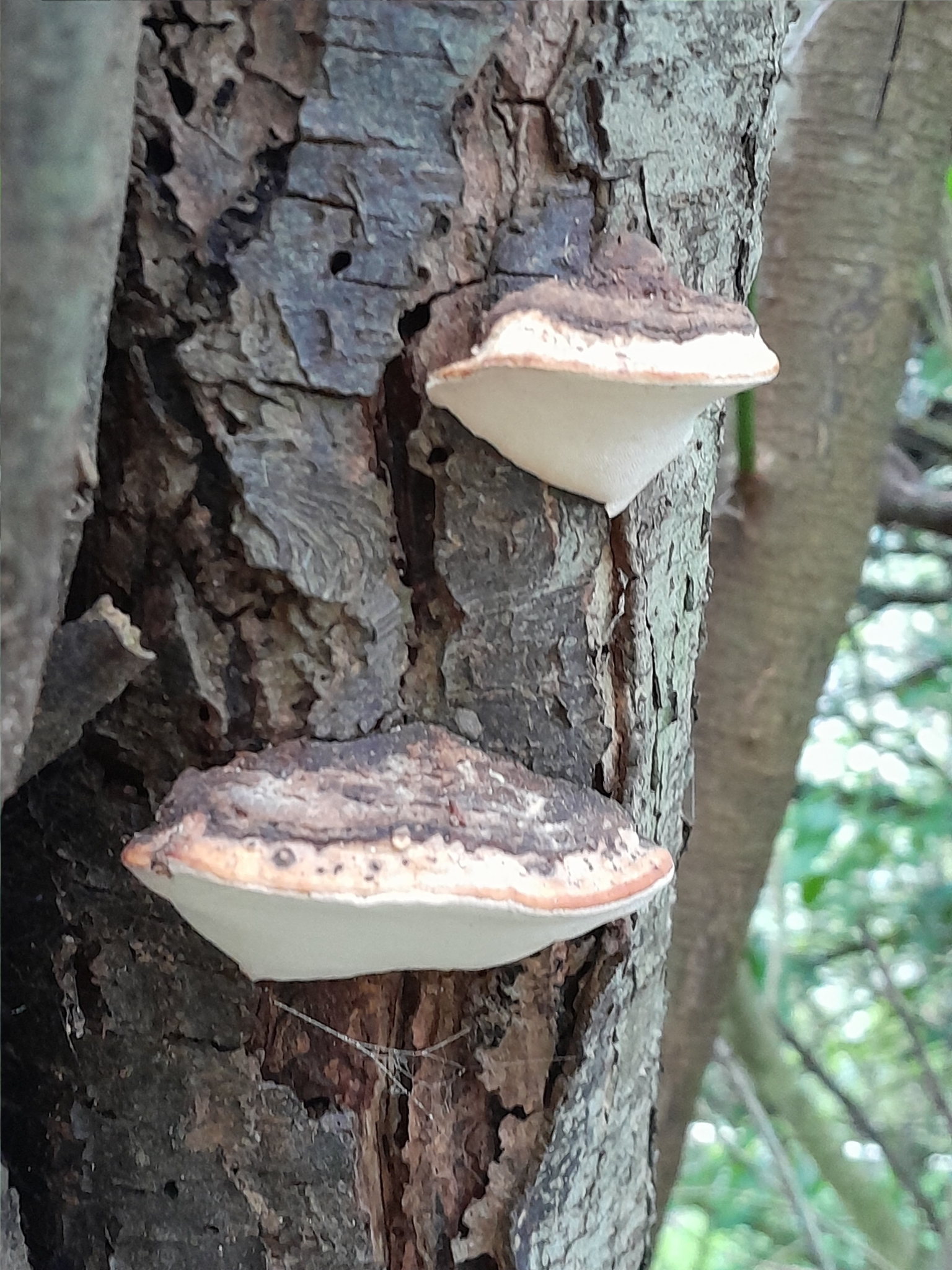
- Pilatoporus hemitephrus

Scientific classification
- Kingdom: Fungi
- Division: Basidiomycota
- Class: Agaricomycetes
- Order: Polyporales
- Family: Fomitopsidaceae
- Genus: Pilatoporus; Kotl. & Pouzar (1990)

Type species
- Pilatoporus palustris (Berk. & M.A.Curtis) Kotl. & Pouzar (1990)

Species
- P. canus; P. durescens; P. hemitephrus; P. maroccanus; P. ostreiformis; P. palustris; P. subtropicus

= Pilatoporus =

Genus of fungi

Pilatoporus is a genus of fungi in the family Fomitopsidaceae.
