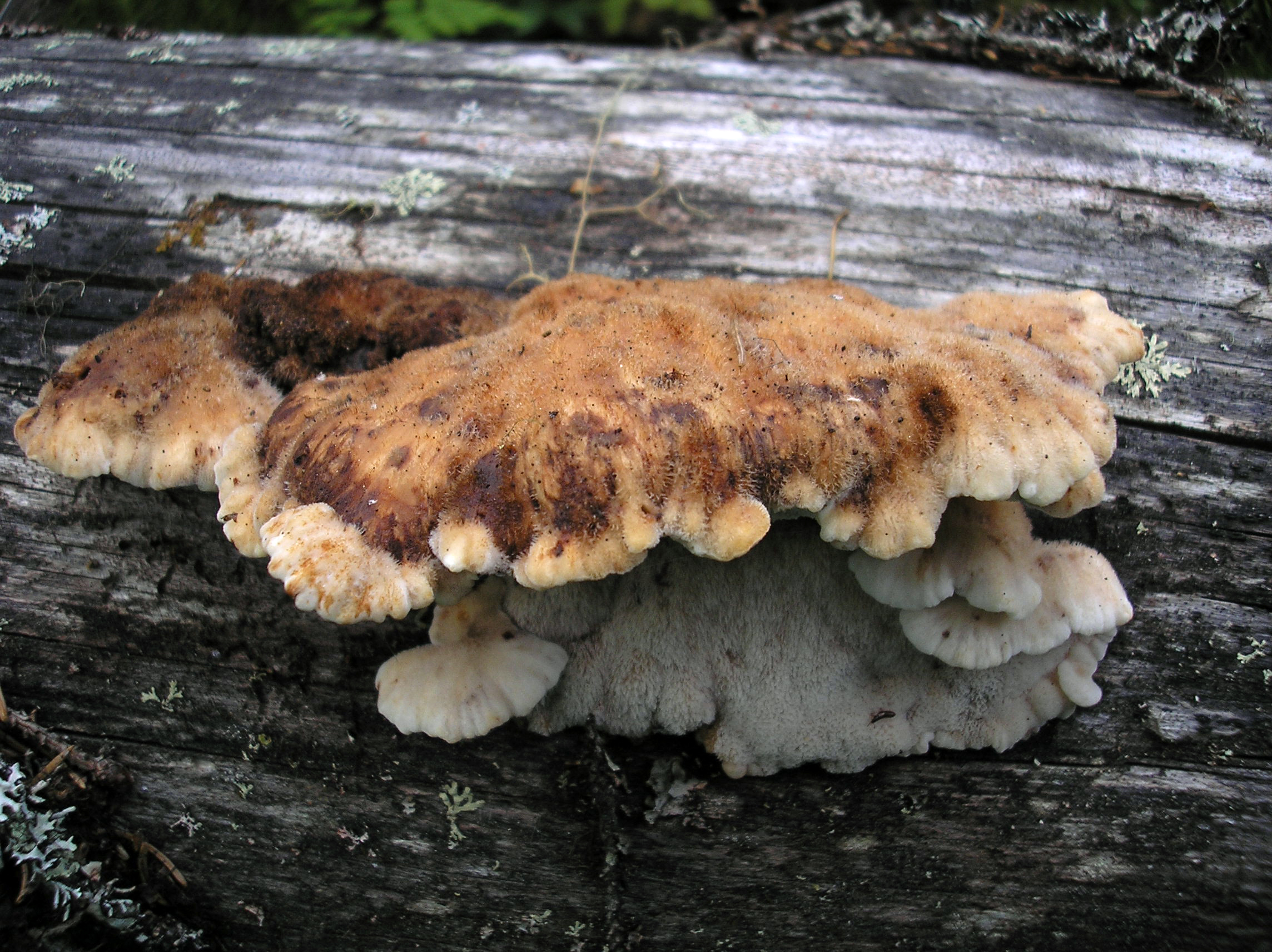
- Amylocystis lapponicus

Scientific classification
- Kingdom: Fungi
- Division: Basidiomycota
- Class: Agaricomycetes
- Order: Polyporales
- Family: Fomitopsidaceae
- Genus: Amylocystis; Bondartsev & Singer (1944)

Type species
- Amylocystis lapponicus (Romell) Bondartsev & Singer ex Singer (1944)

Species
- A. lapponicus A. unicolor

Synonyms
- Amylocystis Bondartsev & Singer (1941)

= Amylocystis =

Genus of fungi

Amylocystis is a genus of two species of fungi in the family Fomitopsidaceae. The genus was described in 1944 by mycologists Appollinaris Semenovich Bondartsev and Rolf Singer to contain the type, and at that time, sole species, A. lapponicus. A. unicolor was transferred to the genus (from Tyromyces) in 2003. The generic name Amylocystis is derived from the Ancient Greek words άμυλον ("starch") and χύστιζ ("bladder").
