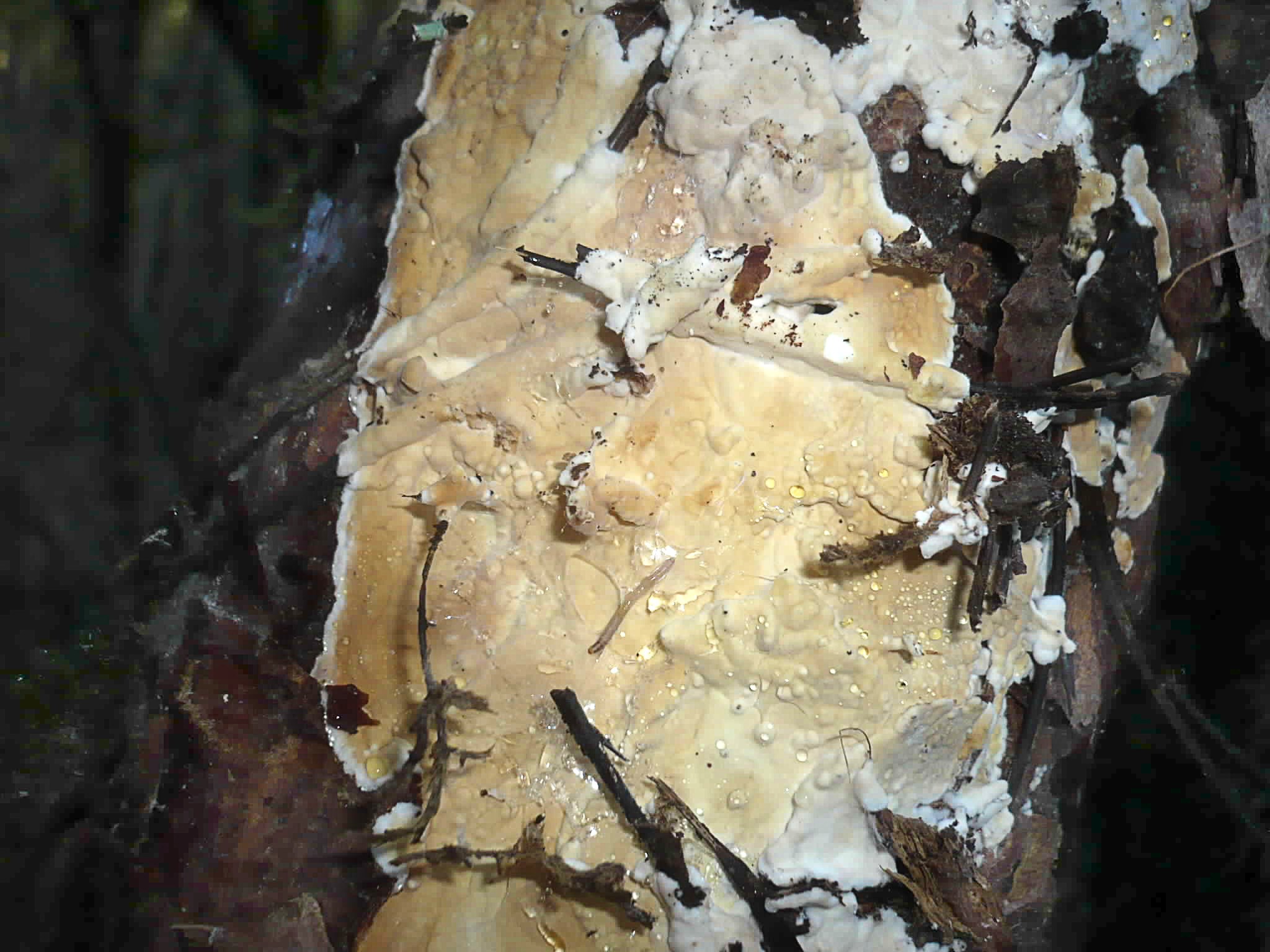
- Dacryobolus karstenii

Scientific classification
- Kingdom: Fungi
- Division: Basidiomycota
- Class: Agaricomycetes
- Order: Polyporales
- Family: Fomitopsidaceae
- Genus: Dacryobolus; Fr. (1849)

Type species
- Dacryobolus sudans (Alb. & Schwein.) Fr. (1849)

Species
- D. costratus D. gracilis D. incarnatus D. karstenii D. montanus D. phalloides D. sudans

Synonyms
- Gloeocystidium P.Karst. (1889)

= Dacryobolus =

Genus of fungi

Dacryobolus is a genus of crust fungi in the family Fomitopsidaceae. Elias Fries circumscribed the genus in 1849 with Dacryobolus sudans (then known as Hydnum sudans Alb. & Schwein.) as the type species. Dacryobolus are wood-decay fungi that cause a brown rot.

== Species ==
- Dacryobolus costratus (Rehill & B.K.Bakshi) S.S.Rattan (1977) – Asia
- Dacryobolus gracilis H.S.Yuan (2016) – China
- Dacryobolus incarnatus Quél. (1885)
- Dacryobolus karstenii (Bres.) Oberw. ex Parmasto (1968) – Europe
- Dacryobolus montanus X.Z.Wan & H.S.Yuan (2016) – China
- Dacryobolus phalloides Manjón, Hjortstam & G.Moreno (1984) – Spain
- Dacryobolus sudans (Alb. & Schwein.) Fr. (1849) – Europe
