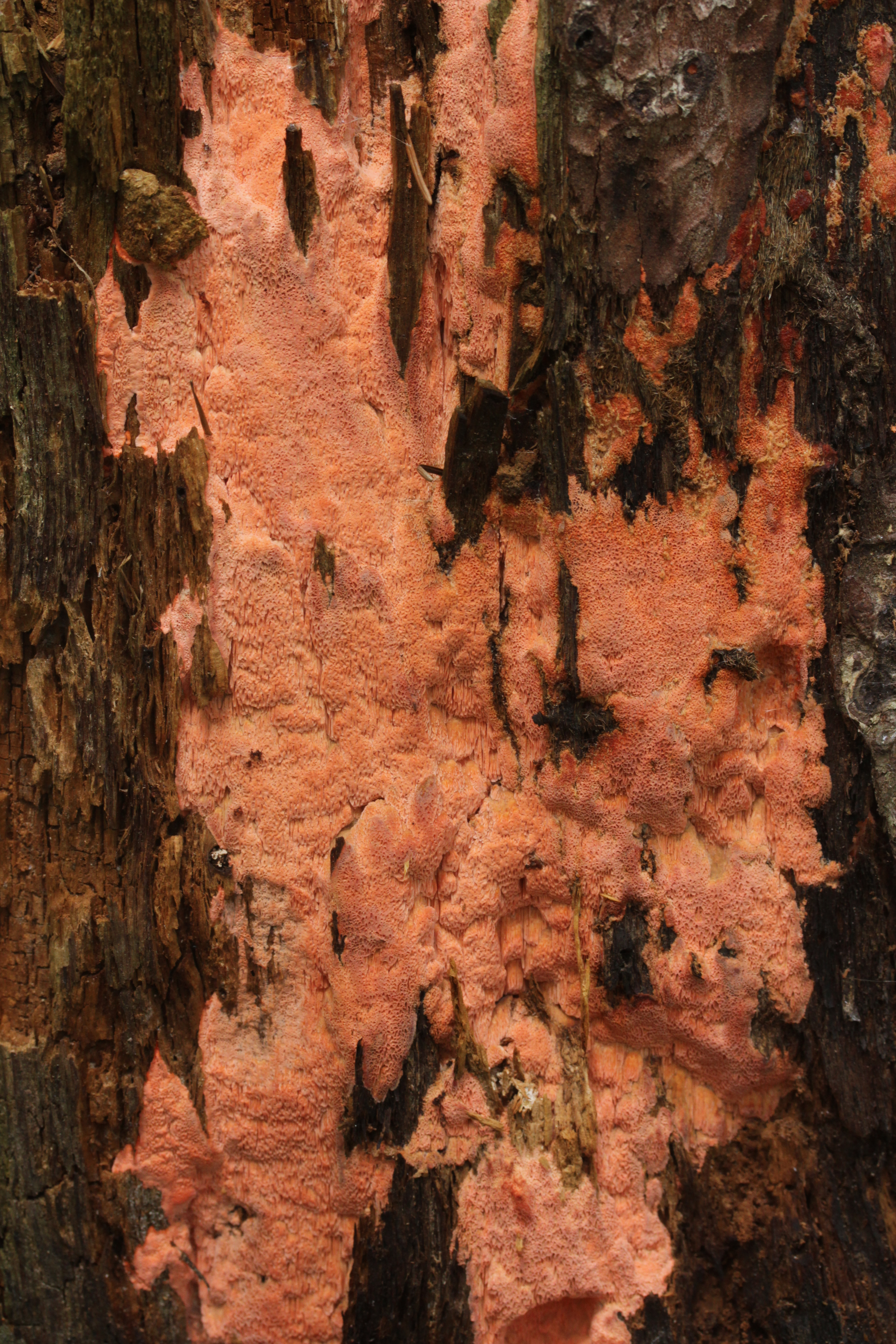
- Rhodonia placenta

Scientific classification
- Domain: Eukaryota
- Kingdom: Fungi
- Division: Basidiomycota
- Class: Agaricomycetes
- Order: Polyporales
- Family: Fomitopsidaceae
- Genus: Rhodonia; Niemelä (2005)

Type species
- Rhodonia placenta (Fr.) Niemelä, K.H.Larss. & Schigel (2005)

= Rhodonia =

Genus of fungi

Rhodonia is a genus of fungal crust fungi in the family Fomitopsidaceae. The species in the genus are species of brown rot, found in China, Europe, and North America, where it grows on decaying conifer wood.

== Taxonomy ==
The genus was circumscribed by the Finnish mycologist Tuomo Niemelä in 2005 to contain the species Rhodonia placenta.

=== Species ===
The following species are recognised in the genus Rhodonia:

- Rhodonia obliqua (Y.L.Wei & W.M.Qin) B.K.Cui, L.L.Shen & Y.C.Dai (2018)
- Rhodonia placenta (Fr.) Niemelä, K.H. Larss. & Schigel (2005)
- Rhodonia rancida (Bres.) B.K.Cui, L.L.Shen & Y.C.Dai (2018)
- Rhodonia subplacenta (B.K.Cui) B.K.Cui, L.L.Shen & Y.C.Dai (2018)
- Rhodonia tianshanensis Yuan Yuan & L.L.Shen (2017)

== Description ==
The fruiting bodies of species of the genus Rhodonia are spread out (effused) on its substrate, poroid, fairly thick, juicy and soft, with a pale rose or white colouring. It has a monomitic hyphal system (containing only generative hyphae), and the hyphae have clamp connections. These hyphae are initially thin-walled but become thick-walled in mature fruit bodies. The spores are cylindric.
