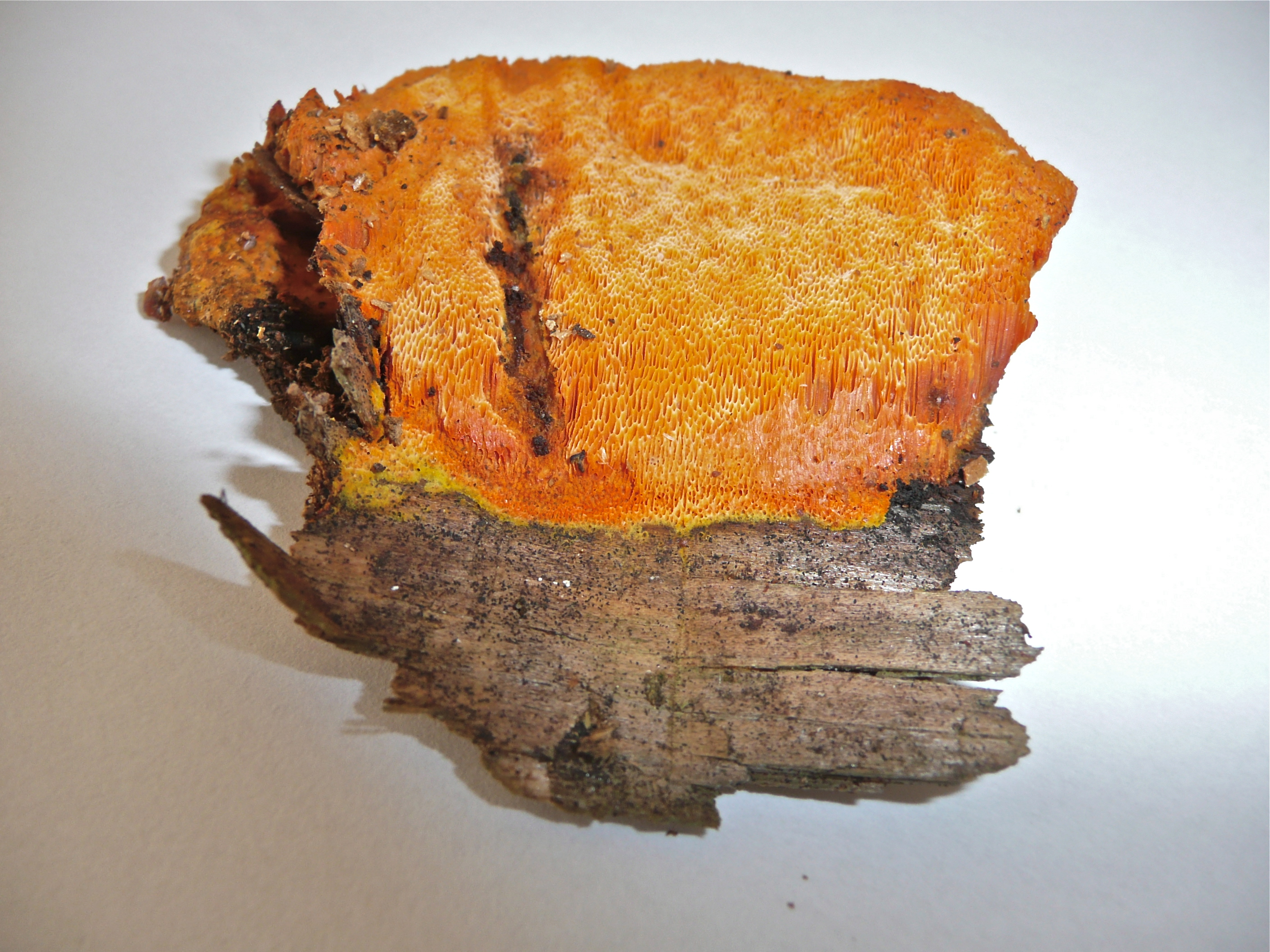
- Auriporia aurulenta

Scientific classification
- Domain: Eukaryota
- Kingdom: Fungi
- Division: Basidiomycota
- Class: Agaricomycetes
- Order: Polyporales
- Family: Fomitopsidaceae
- Genus: Auriporia; Ryvarden (1973)

Type species
- Auriporia aurea (Peck) Ryvarden (1973)

Species
- A. aurea A. aurulenta A. brasilica A. pileata

= Auriporia =

Genus of fungi

Auriporia is a small genus of four species of poroid fungi in the family Fomitopsidaceae.

== Taxonomy ==
The genus was circumscribed by Norwegian mycologist Leif Ryvarden in 1973, with what was then known as Poria aurea as the type species.

Although the genus is typically classified in the family Fomitopsidaceae, a recent (2017) multi-gene phylogenetic analysis placed Auriporia outside of Antrodia clade, and could not assign the genus to any existing family in the Polyporales.

== Description ==
Auriporia are characterized by crust-like fruit bodies with a yellowish pore surface that grow on dead wood. They have a monomitic hyphal system with generative hyphae that are clamped, and thin to thick-walled. The cystidia are smooth with short side branches or protuberances, and are typically incrusted at the apex. The spores produced are hyaline (translucent), oblong, and ellipsoid in shape. Auriporia fungi cause a brown wood rot.

== Species ==
- Auriporia aurea (Peck) Ryvarden (1973) – Europe, North America
- Auriporia aurulenta A.David, Tortic & Jelic (1975) – Europe
- Auriporia brasilica G.Coelho (2005) – Brazil
- Auriporia pileata Parmasto (1980) – East Asia
