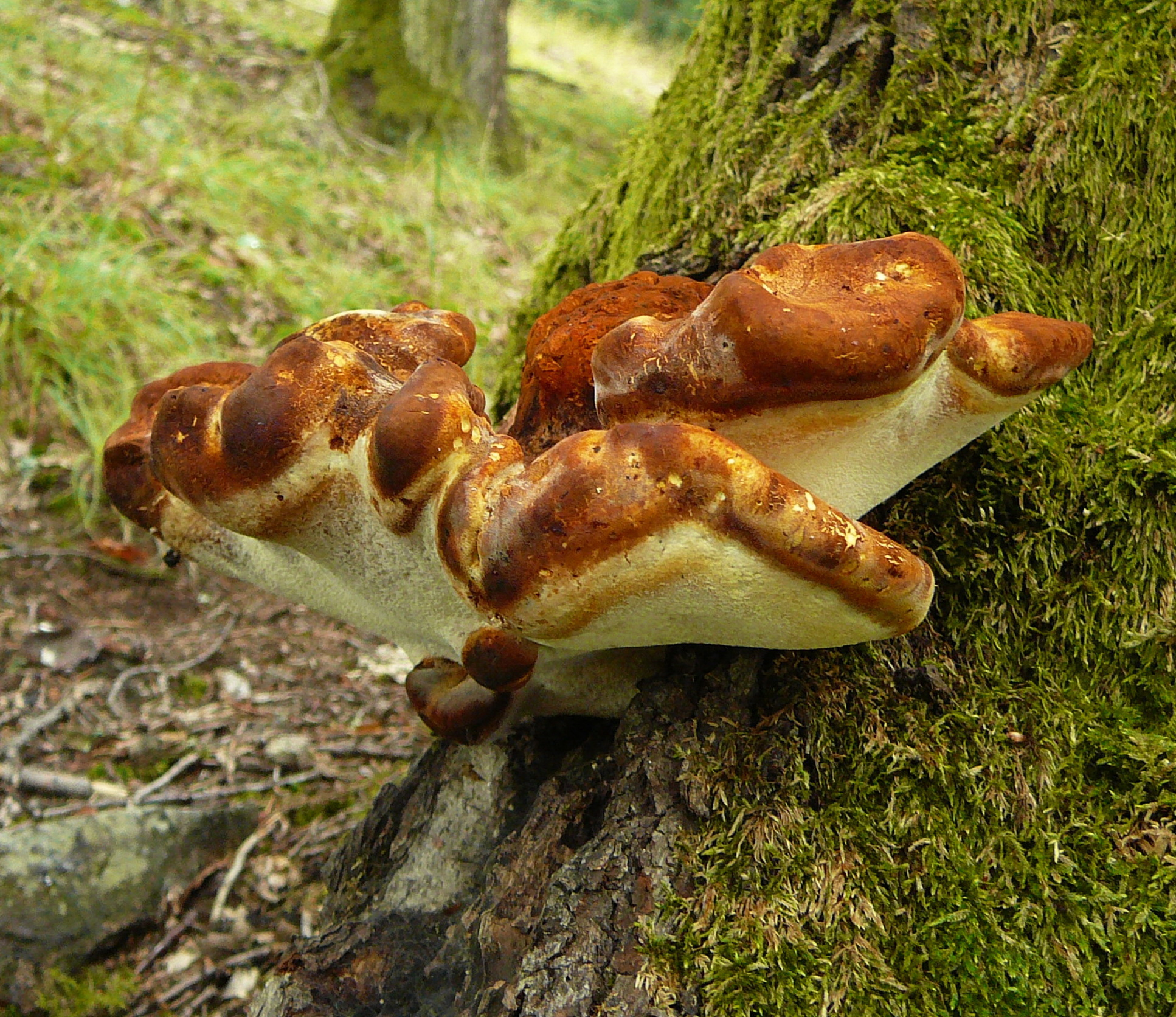
- Buglossoporus quercinus, Czech Republic

Scientific classification
- Kingdom: Fungi
- Division: Basidiomycota
- Class: Agaricomycetes
- Order: Polyporales
- Family: Fomitopsidaceae
- Genus: Buglossoporus; Kotl. & Pouzar (1966)

Type species
- Buglossoporus quercinus (Schrad.) Kotl. & Pouzar (1966)

= Buglossoporus =

Genus of fungi

Buglossoporus is a genus of fungi in the family Fomitopsidaceae. The genus was circumscribed in 1966 by Czech mycologists František Kotlába and Zdeněk Pouzar, with Buglossoporus quercinus as the type species. In some works, Buglossoporus has been treated as a synonym of Piptoporus.

Buglossoporus magnus, known from only three locations in old growth lowland rainforest of Peninsular Malaysia, is considered a vulnerable species by the IUCN, and appears on their Red List.

== Description ==
The fruit bodies of Buglossoporus are annual. They have a cap, and a variable attachment to the substrate—in some species the cap is attached directly, while others have a stipe. The cap surface ranges in colour from pink, cinnamon, orange to brown, with a texture that is either felt-like or smooth, without zone lines. The pore surface on the cap underside is white, cream, buff to brown. Pores are small, with a round to angular shape. The context is white, cream, buff, orange to brown, corky, and thicker than the tubes. It sometimes has a pellicle (a thin membrane) at the upper surface. The tubes are thin and fragile.

Buglossoporus has a hyphal system that is dimitic in the context, but monomitic in the trama. Generative hyphae have clamp connections, while the skeletal hyphae are thick-walled. There are no cystidia in the hymenium, but thin-walled cystidioles are typically present. Spores produced by Buglossoporus range in shape from ellipsoid, to cylindrical, to spindle-shaped. They are hyaline, thin-walled, and smooth, showing no reaction to Melzer's reagent. The fungus grows on angiosperm wood and causes a brown rot.

Molecular phylogenetic analysis shows Buglossoporus be closely related to Neolentiporus. This latter genus, however, has a dimitic hyphal system in trama with irregularly thick-walled generative hyphae, and skeletal hyphae that are metachromatic.

== Species list ==
- Buglossoporus americanus D.A.Reid (1976) – Costa Rica
- Buglossoporus brunneiflavus Corner (1984)
- Buglossoporus eucalypticola M.L.Han, B.K.Cui & Y.C.Dai (2016) – China
- Buglossoporus flavus Corner (1984)
- Buglossoporus heritierae Corner (1984)
- Buglossoporus magnus Corner (1984)
- Buglossoporus malesianus Corner (1984) – Asia
- Buglossoporus marmoratus Corner (1984)
- Buglossoporus quercinus (Schrad.) Kotl. & Pouzar (1966)

In a later study of Corner's Asian and West Pacific collections, Tsutomu Hattori concluded that both B. brunneiflavus and Buglossoporus flavus were "dubious species" due to "poor or sterile conditions", and that Buglossoporus matangensis and B. rufescens are synonyms of B. malesianus. This latter synonymy was supported in a 2016 study.
