= Lasiochlaena =

Scientific classification
- Kingdom: Fungi
- Division: Basidiomycota
- Class: Agaricomycetes
- Order: Polyporales
- Family: Fomitopsidaceae
- Genus: Lasiochlaena; Pouzar (1990)
- Species: L. anisea

Binomial name
- Lasiochlaena anisea Pouzar (1990)

Genus of fungi

Lasiochlaena is a fungal genus in the family Fomitopsidaceae. It is a monotypic genus, containing the single species Lasiochlaena anisea, found in Europe. The genus was circumscribed by Czech mycologist Zdenek Pouzar in 1990.
