= Neolentiporus =

Scientific classification
- Kingdom: Fungi
- Division: Basidiomycota
- Class: Agaricomycetes
- Order: Polyporales
- Family: Fomitopsidaceae
- Genus: Neolentiporus; Rajchenb. (1995)

Type species
- Neolentiporus maculatissimus (Lloyd) Rajchenb. (1995)

Species
- N. maculatissimus N. squamosellus

Genus of fungi

Neolentiporus is a fungal genus in the family Fomitopsidaceae. It contains Neolentiporus squamosellus and the type species N. maculatissimus. The genus was circumscribed by mycologist Mario Rajchenberg in 1995.

== Description ==
Neolentiporus is characterized by medium to large fruit bodies that have stipes and a poroid hymenium on the cap underside. The caps are circular to fan-shaped with a scaly surface, and have an off-centre or lateral stipe that sometimes is reduced to a short, robust umbo. The hyphal system is dimitic with clamped, irregularly thick-walled generative hyphae that do not react with cresyl-blue stain. The skeletal hyphae are unbranched, thick-walled, and are strongly metachromatic in cresyl-blue. Spores are cylindrical, hyaline, thin-walled, inamyloid, and binucleate. Neolentiporus causes a brown rot. Molecular phylogenetic analysis shows Neolentiporus to be closely related to Buglossoporus. This latter genus, however, has a monomitic hyphal system in the trama, and lacks metachromatic skeletal hyphae.
