= Nattavaara =

Coordinates: 66.7538°N 20.9502°E

- Interactive map of Nattavaara
- Country: Sweden
- Province: Swedish Lapland
- County: Norrbotten
- Municipality: Gällivare
- Elevation: 320 m (1,050 ft)

Population (2015)
  - Total: 114

Nattavaara is a minor locality in Gällivare Municipality, Norrbotten County in the province of Lapland in Sweden. The settlement had a permanent population of 114 as of the year 2015. Nattavaara is located 53 kilometres (33 mi) by road south of municipal seat Gällivare. That is also the nearest urban area, with Jokkmokk being slightly further away to the southwest. The only paved roads are to the north and the east, whereas the Jokkmokk road transitions into a gravel road just west of the village.

Nattavaara is actually two villages in Gällivare Municipality, the southern Nattavaara and the northern Nattavaara by. When the construction of the Iron Ore Line in 1887 reached the Råne river the settlement Nattavaara station was established on the pine heath west of the Råne river, about 5 km from the original village on the mountain, Nattavaara by. The settlement Nattavaara has a station on the rail line between Stockholm and Narvik in Nordland, Norway.

== Climate ==
Nattavaara has a subarctic climate (Köppen Dfc) typical of central Lapland. Winters are long, dark and cold with an extensive snow cover, whereas the midnight sun in summer is accompanied by temperatures of about 20 °C (68 °F) on average. Winters can sometimes fall below −40 °C (−40 °F) and are among the coldest in terms of Swedish locations with weather stations.

Climate data for Nattavaara (2002–2021 averages, extremes since 1996 & five years between 1945 and 1963)
Month	Jan	Feb	Mar	Apr	May	Jun	Jul	Aug	Sep	Oct	Nov	Dec	Year
Record high °C (°F)	7.0 (44.6)	7.8 (46.0)	11.0 (51.8)	17.3 (63.1)	27.8 (82.0)	31.1 (88.0)	32.6 (90.7)	29.2 (84.6)	23.1 (73.6)	16.8 (62.2)	8.0 (46.4)	6.6 (43.9)	32.6 (90.7)
Mean maximum °C (°F)	1.0 (33.8)	2.7 (36.9)	6.3 (43.3)	12.1 (53.8)	21.6 (70.9)	25.1 (77.2)	26.6 (79.9)	24.4 (75.9)	18.5 (65.3)	10.3 (50.5)	3.7 (38.7)	2.3 (36.1)	28.1 (82.6)
Mean daily maximum °C (°F)	−8.9 (16.0)	−7.1 (19.2)	−1.4 (29.5)	4.5 (40.1)	10.8 (51.4)	16.9 (62.4)	20.1 (68.2)	17.3 (63.1)	11.4 (52.5)	3.0 (37.4)	−3.3 (26.1)	−6.2 (20.8)	4.8 (40.6)
Daily mean °C (°F)	−13.9 (7.0)	−12.6 (9.3)	−7.5 (18.5)	−0.9 (30.4)	5.5 (41.9)	11.6 (52.9)	14.7 (58.5)	12.1 (53.8)	6.9 (44.4)	−0.5 (31.1)	−7.4 (18.7)	−10.9 (12.4)	−0.2 (31.6)
Mean daily minimum °C (°F)	−18.8 (−1.8)	−18.0 (−0.4)	−13.5 (7.7)	−6.3 (20.7)	0.2 (32.4)	6.3 (43.3)	9.2 (48.6)	6.9 (44.4)	2.4 (36.3)	−3.9 (25.0)	−11.5 (11.3)	−15.6 (3.9)	−5.2 (22.6)
Mean minimum °C (°F)	−34.3 (−29.7)	−33.6 (−28.5)	−30.0 (−22.0)	−19.3 (−2.7)	−7.1 (19.2)	0.0 (32.0)	3.0 (37.4)	−0.8 (30.6)	−4.9 (23.2)	−17.1 (1.2)	−26.2 (−15.2)	−30.9 (−23.6)	−37.2 (−35.0)
Record low °C (°F)	−46.2 (−51.2)	−41.2 (−42.2)	−40.2 (−40.4)	−28.7 (−19.7)	−14.3 (6.3)	−4.5 (23.9)	0.0 (32.0)	−3.0 (26.6)	−8.0 (17.6)	−27.3 (−17.1)	−36.9 (−34.4)	−40.6 (−41.1)	−46.2 (−51.2)
Average precipitation mm (inches)	38.9 (1.53)	36.1 (1.42)	24.2 (0.95)	24.9 (0.98)	40.0 (1.57)	60.7 (2.39)	85.0 (3.35)	71.8 (2.83)	68.4 (2.69)	46.5 (1.83)	46.5 (1.83)	45.2 (1.78)	588.2 (23.15)
Source 1: SMHI Open Data for Nattavaara A, precipitation
Source 2: SMHI Open Data for Nattavaara A, temperature

== Images ==
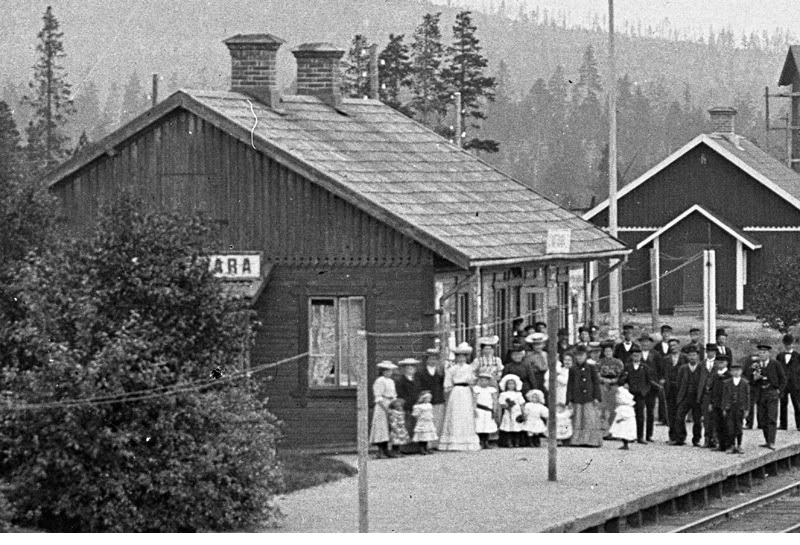

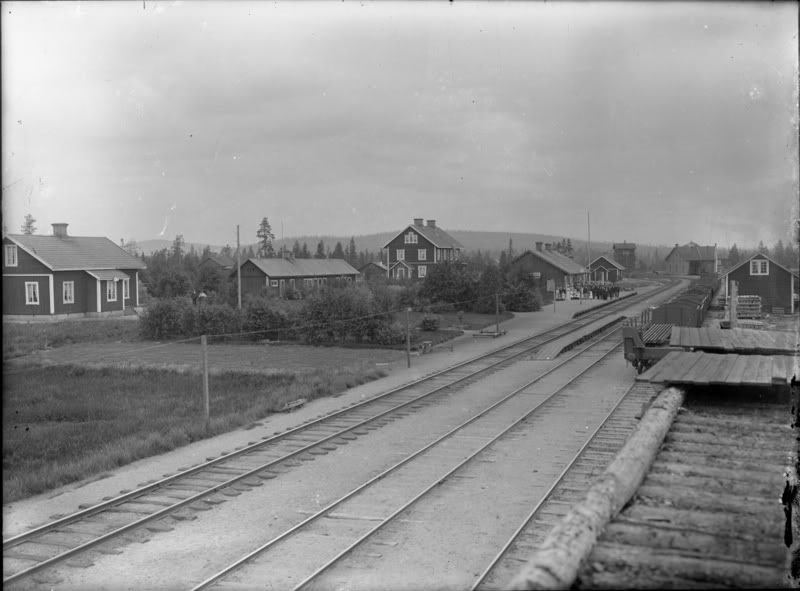

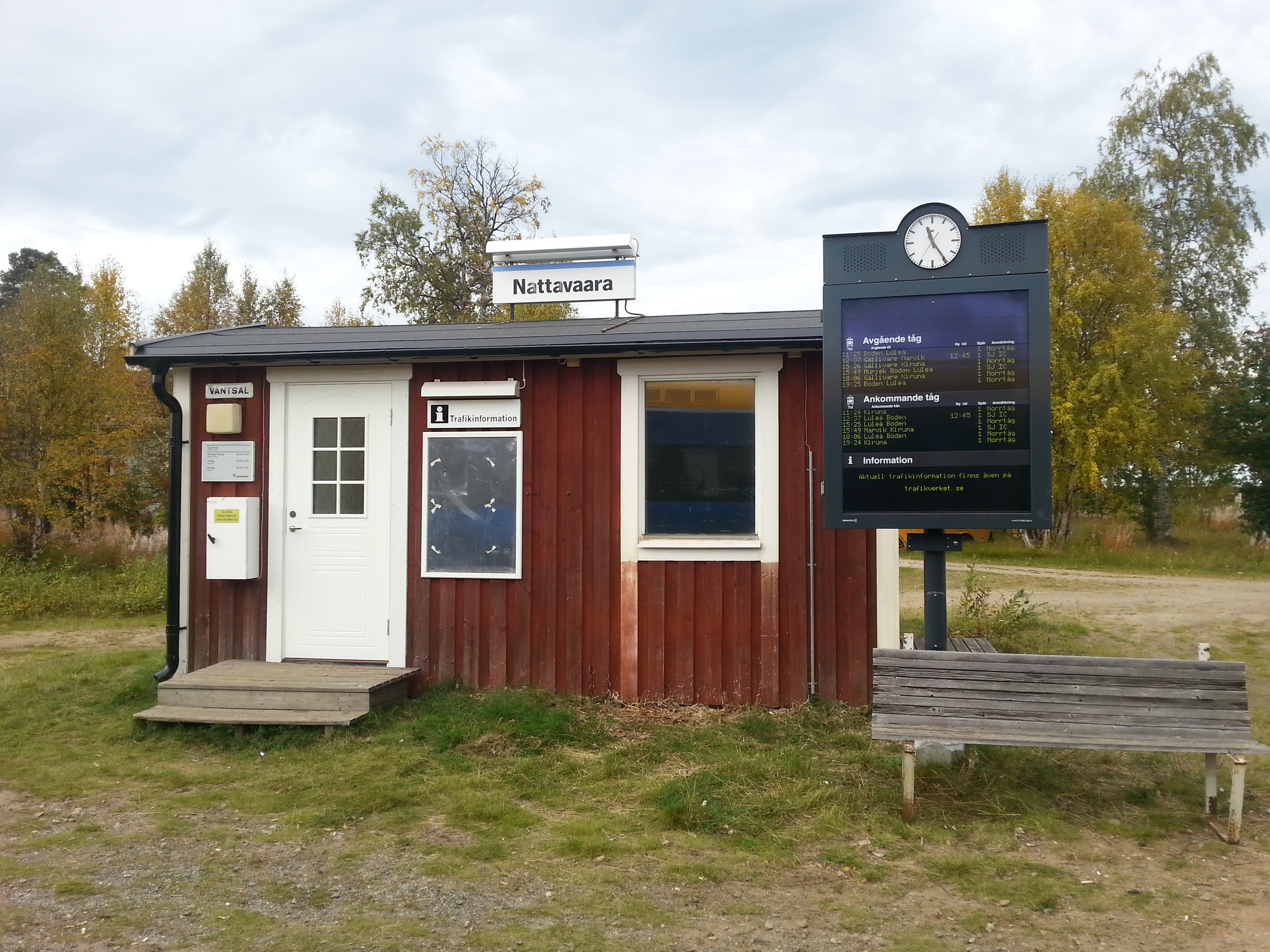

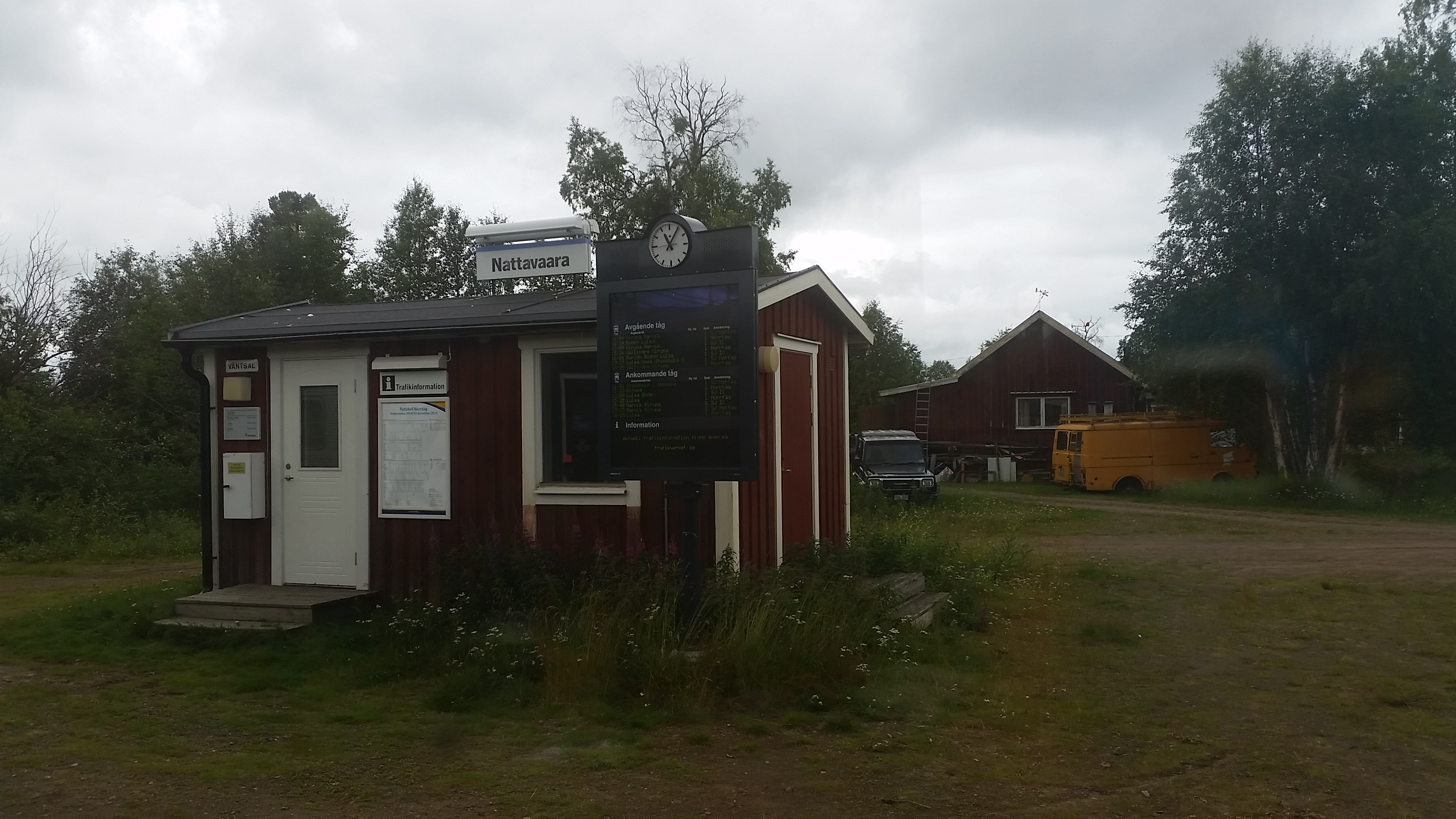

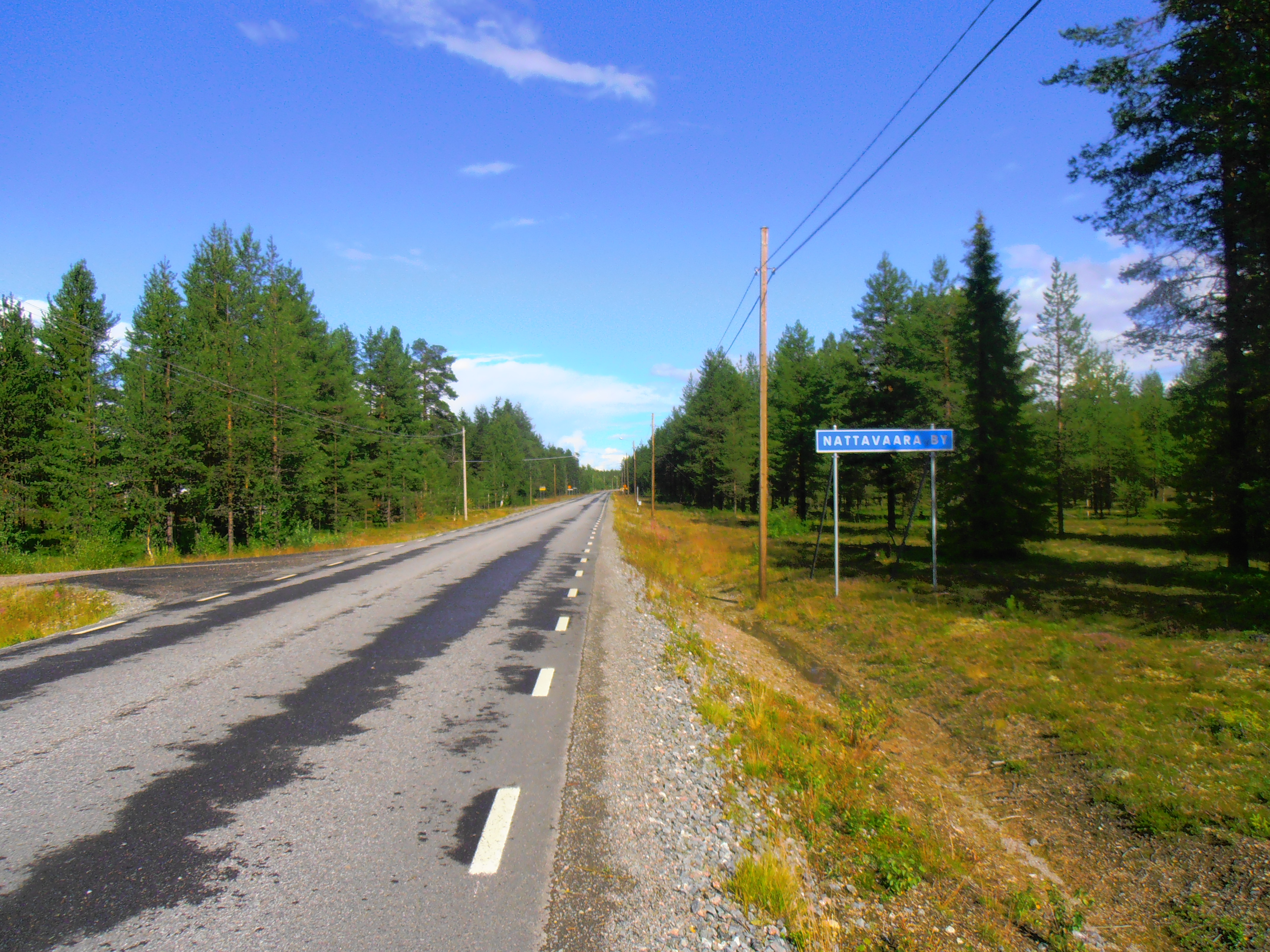
