= Quercinol =

Names
- Preferred IUPAC name (2S)-2-Methoxy-2-methyl-2H-1-benzopyran-6-ol

Identifiers
3D model (JSmol)	Interactive image
ChEMBL	ChEMBL603950
ChemSpider	24652783
PubChem CID	46230832
- InChI: InChI=1S/C11H12O3/c1-11(13-2)6-5-8-7-9(12)3-4-10(8)14-11/h3-7,12H,1-2H3/t11-/m0/s1 Key: DLZKKUHAZDHCSL-NSHDSACASA-N
- SMILES: C[C@]1(C=CC2=C(O1)C=CC(=C2)O)OC

Properties
Chemical formula	C_{11}H_{12}O_{3}
Molar mass	192.214 g·mol^{−1}
- Except where otherwise noted, data are given for materials in their standard state (at 25 °C [77 °F], 100 kPa). Infobox references

Quercinol (a chromene derivative), isolated from the mushroom Fomitopsis quercina, has in vitro anti-inflammatory activity, and inhibits the enzymes cyclooxygenase-2, xanthine oxidase, and horseradish peroxidase.
