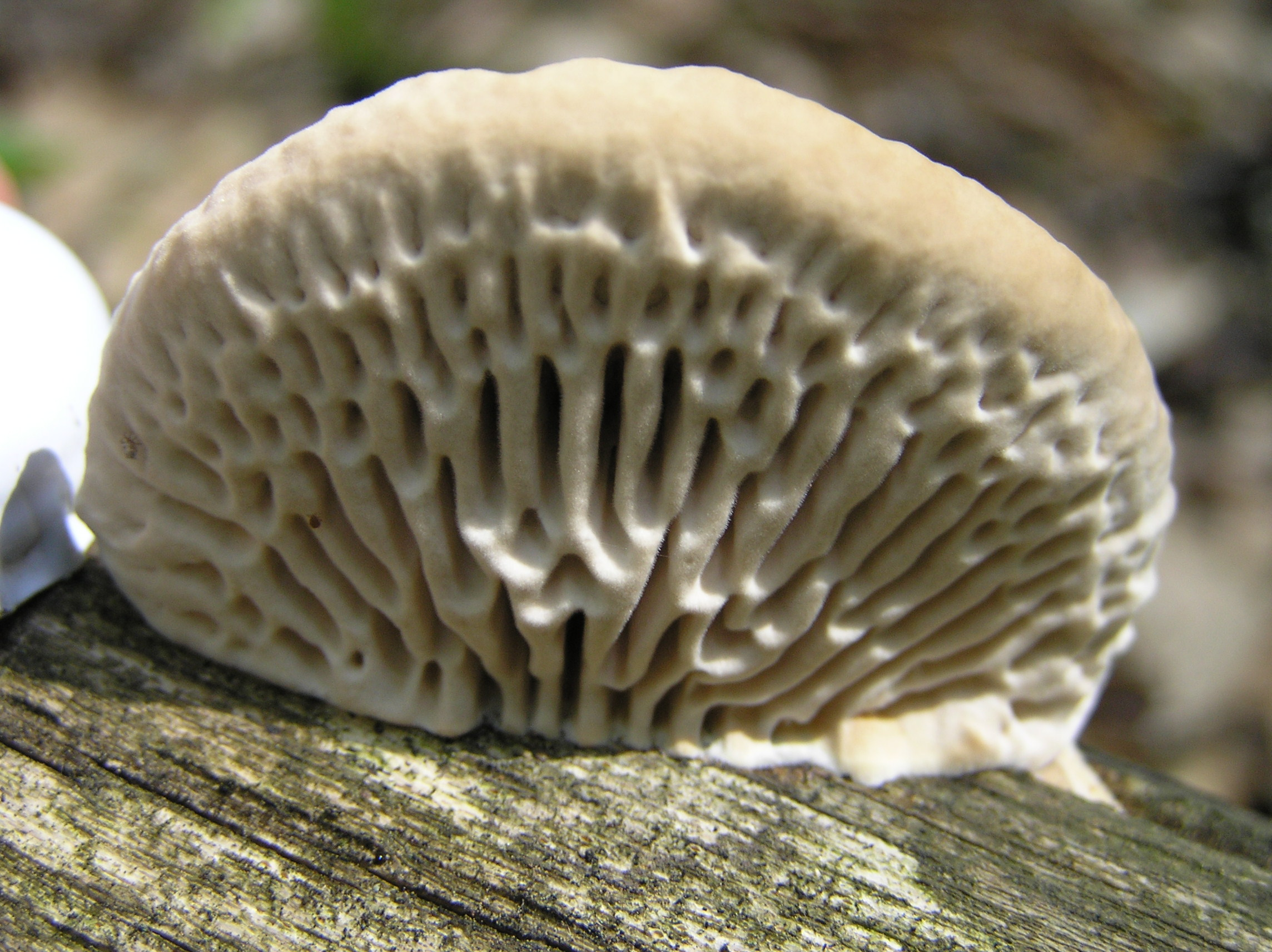
- Daedalea quercina

Scientific classification
- Domain: Eukaryota
- Kingdom: Fungi
- Division: Basidiomycota
- Class: Agaricomycetes
- Order: Polyporales
- Family: Fomitopsidaceae
- Genus: Daedalea; Pers. (1801)

Type species
- Daedalea quercina (L.) Pers. (1801)

Synonyms
- Striglia Adans. (1763); Xylostroma Tode (1790); Agarico-suber Paulet (1793); Spelaeomyces Fresen. (1863); Agaricus Murrill (1905); Phaeodaedalea M.Fidalgo (1962)

= Daedalea =

Genus of fungi

Daedalea is a genus of fungi in the family Fomitopsidaceae. The genus was circumscribed in 1801 by mycologist Christian Hendrik Persoon, based on the type D. quercina and four other species. The generic name is derived from the Ancient Greek δαιδαλεος ("curiously wrought").

== Species ==
- Daedalea abortiva (Peck) Pat. (1900)
- Daedalea aethalodes (Mont.) Rajchenb. (1986) – Bolivia
- Daedalea africana I.Johans. & Ryvarden (1980) – Zambia
- Daedalea allantoidea M.L.Han, B.K.Cui & Y.C.Dai (2016) – China
- Daedalea ambigua Berk. (1845)
- Daedalea americana M.L.Han & B.K.Cui (2015) – North America; Central America
- Daedalea candicans P.Karst. (1911)
- Daedalea circularis B.K.Cui & Hai J.Li (2013)
- Daedalea dickinsii Yasuda (1923)
- Daedalea dochmia (Berk. & Broome) T.Hatt. (2005) – Cuba; Philippines
- Daedalea ealaensis Beeli (1929)
- Daedalea epidryphloeus E.H.L.Krause (1928)
- Daedalea favoloides Murrill (1912)
- Daedalea fulvirubida (Corner) T.Hatt. (2005)
- Daedalea hydnoides I.Lindblad & Ryvarden (1999) – Costa Rica
- Daedalea laciniata (Pers.) Pat. (1900)
- Daedalea langkawiensis Corner (1987)
- Daedalea ligneotexta Van der Byl (1924)
- Daedalea lusor (Corner) T.Hatt. (2005)
- Daedalea microsticta Cooke (1882)
- Daedalea milliaui Beeli (1930)
- Daedalea moesta (Kalchbr.) Rajchenb. (1986)
- Daedalea mollicula Lloyd (1922)
- Daedalea neotropica D.L.Lindner, Ryvarden & T.J.Baroni (2011)
- Daedalea ochracea Velen. (1922)
- Daedalea parasitica Velen. (1922)
- Daedalea pinicola (Lázaro Ibiza) Sacc. & Trotter (1925)
- Daedalea proserpens E.H.L.Krause (1928)
- Daedalea pseudodochmia (Corner) T.Hatt. (2005)
- Daedalea quercina (L.) Pers. (1801) – Africa; Europe
- Daedalea radiata B.K.Cui & Hai J.Li (2013)
- Daedalea reflexa Lloyd (1922) – Philippines
- Daedalea roseola Lloyd (1922)
- Daedalea ryvardeniana Drechsler-Santos & Robledo (2012) – Brazil
- Daedalea stevensonii Petr. (1959)
- Daedalea sulcata (Berk.) Ryvarden (1977) – Philippines
- Daedalea trametea (Quél.) Sacc. & Traverso (1910)
