= 4-(4-Methylphenyl)-4-oxobutanoic acid =

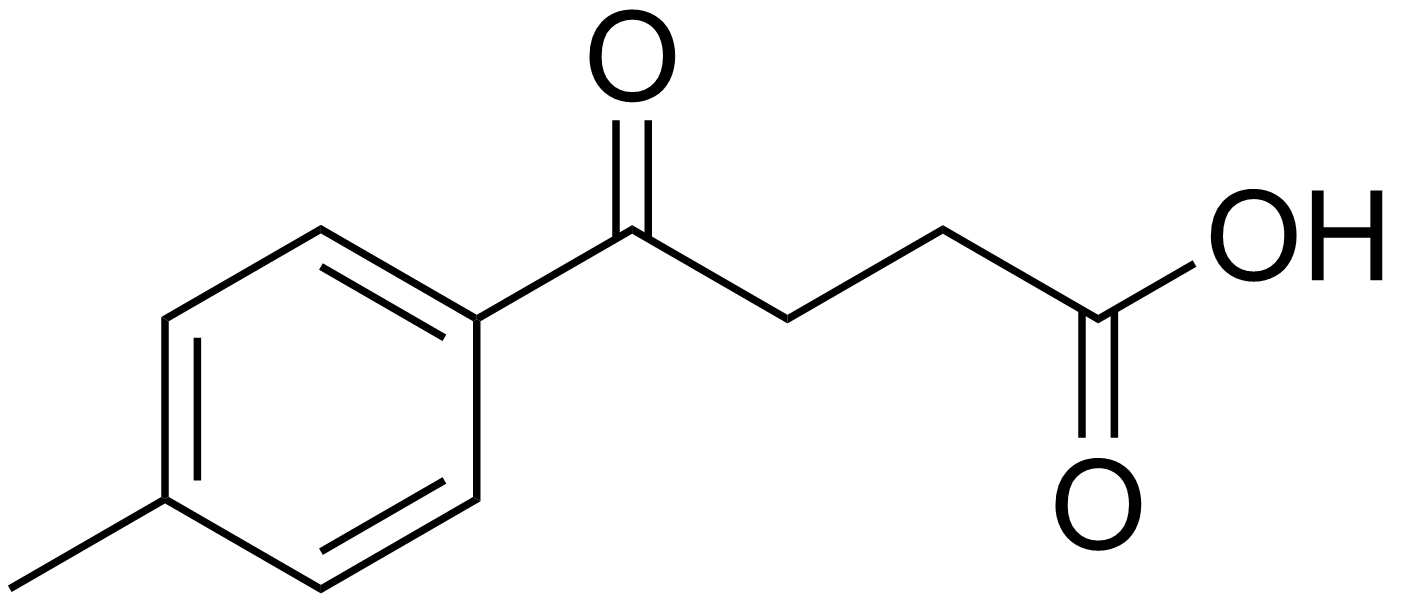

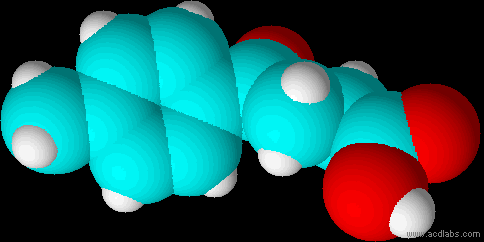

Names
- Preferred IUPAC name 4-(4-Methylphenyl)-4-oxobutanoic acid
- Other names 3-(4-Methylbenzoyl)propionic acid 3-(p-Toluoyl)propionic acid 4-(4-Methylphenyl)-4-oxobutyric acid

Identifiers
CAS Number	4619-20-9
3D model (JSmol)	Interactive image
ChemSpider	213498
ECHA InfoCard	100.118.705
EC Number	610-285-9
PubChem CID	244162
UNII	ZYB7JU7CMX
CompTox Dashboard (EPA)	DTXSID00288225
- InChI: InChI=1S/C11H12O3/c1-8-2-4-9(5-3-8)10(12)6-7-11(13)14/h2-5H,6-7H2,1H3,(H,13,14) Key: OEEUWZITKKSXAZ-UHFFFAOYSA-N; InChI=1/C11H12O3/c1-8-2-4-9(5-3-8)10(12)6-7-11(13)14/h2-5H,6-7H2,1H3,(H,13,14) Key: OEEUWZITKKSXAZ-UHFFFAOYAH
- SMILES: O=C(c1ccc(cc1)C)CCC(=O)O

Properties
Chemical formula	C_{11}H_{12}O_{3}
Molar mass	192.214 g·mol^{−1}
Appearance	White powder
Melting point	129 °C (264 °F; 402 K)
Solubility in water	Insoluble

Hazards
- Occupational safety and health (OHS/OSH)
Main hazards	Flammable
- GHS labelling
Pictograms	(GHS07: Exclamation mark)
Signal word	Warning
Hazard statements	H315, H319, H335
Precautionary statements	P261, P264, P271, P280, P302+P352, P304+P340, P305+P351+P338, P312, P332+P313, P337+P313, P362, P403+P233, P405, P501
- Except where otherwise noted, data are given for materials in their standard state (at 25 °C [77 °F], 100 kPa). verify (what is ?) Infobox references

4-(4-Methylphenyl)-4-oxobutanoic acid is an organic carboxylic acid. The preparation of it is used for undergraduate teaching of organic chemistry synthesis.

== Preparation ==
4-(4-Methylphenyl)-4-oxobutanoic acid can be prepared by a Friedel–Crafts reaction between toluene and succinic anhydride catalyzed by a Lewis acid such as aluminium chloride.
