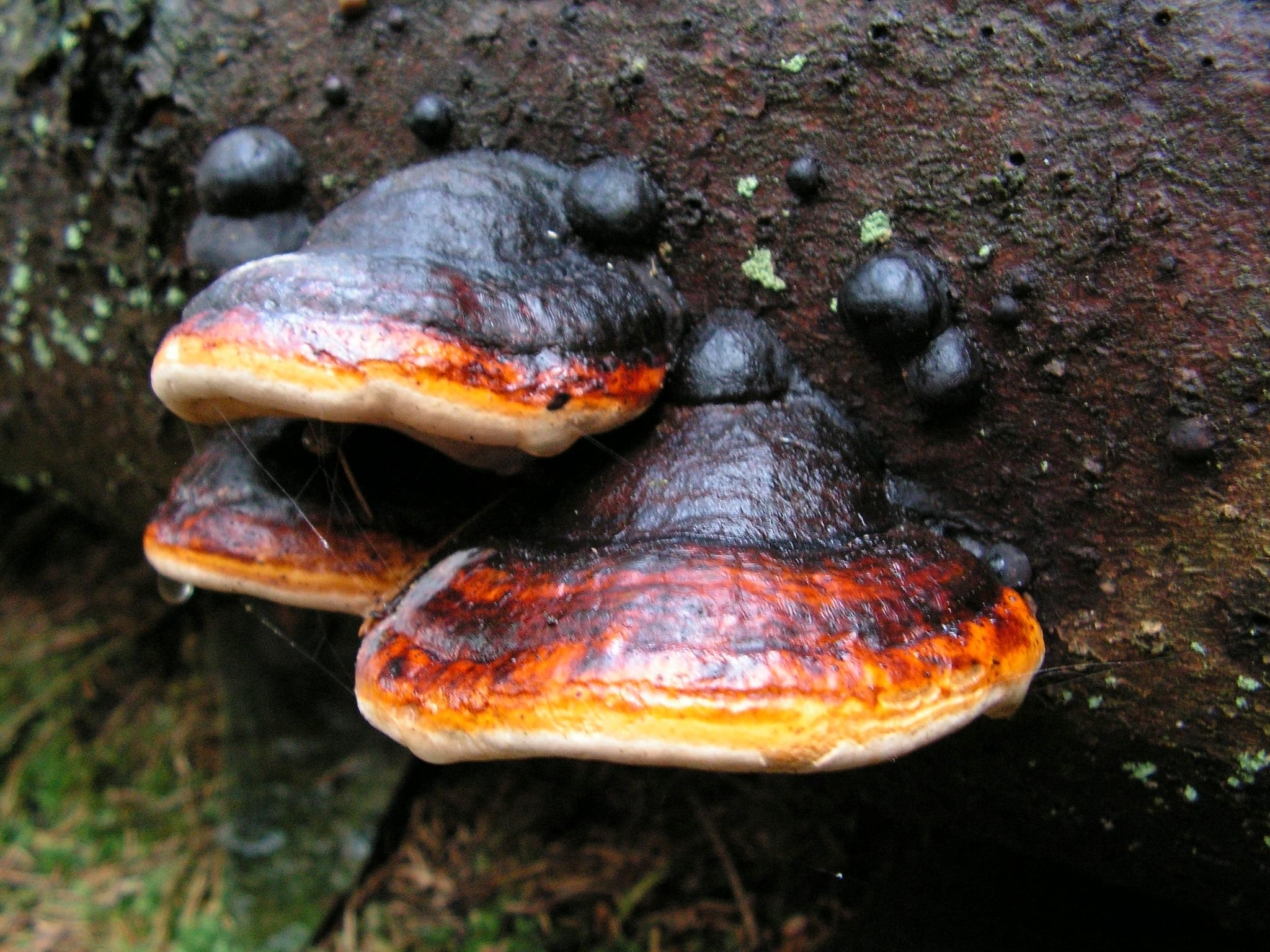
- Fomitopsis pinicola, member of the Fomitopsidaceae

Scientific classification
- Kingdom: Fungi
- Division: Basidiomycota
- Class: Agaricomycetes
- Order: Polyporales
- Family: Fomitopsidaceae; Jülich (1982)

Type genus
- Fomitopsis P.Karst. (1881)

Synonyms
- Daedaleaceae Jülich (1981); Piptoporaceae Jülich (1981)

= Fomitopsidaceae =

Family of fungi

The Fomitopsidaceae are a family of fungi in the order Polyporales. Most species are parasitic on woody plants, and tend to cause brown rots. The name comes from Fomitopsis (meaning "looking like Fomes") + -aceae (a suffix used to form taxonomic family names).

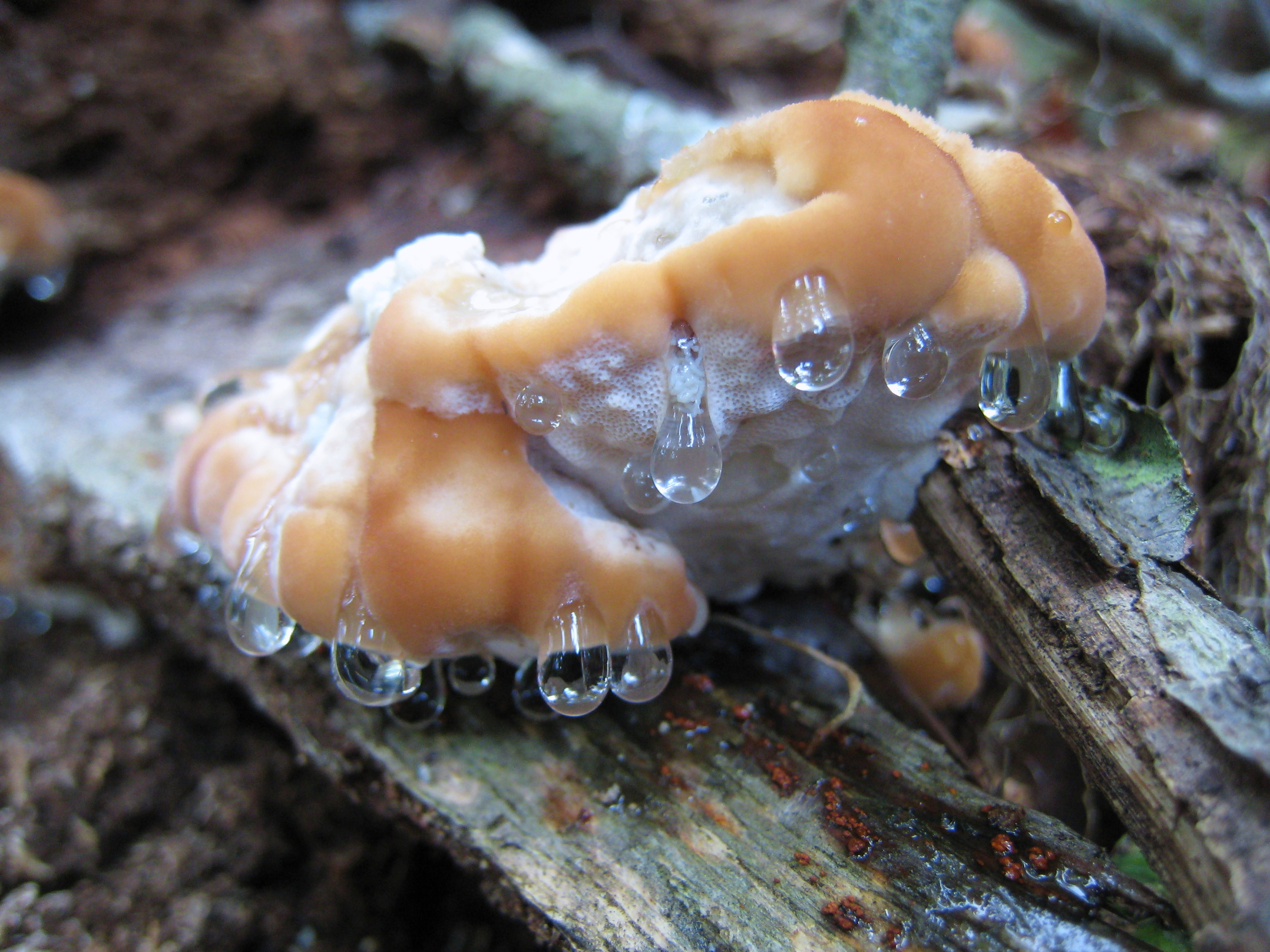
Niveoporofomes spraguei

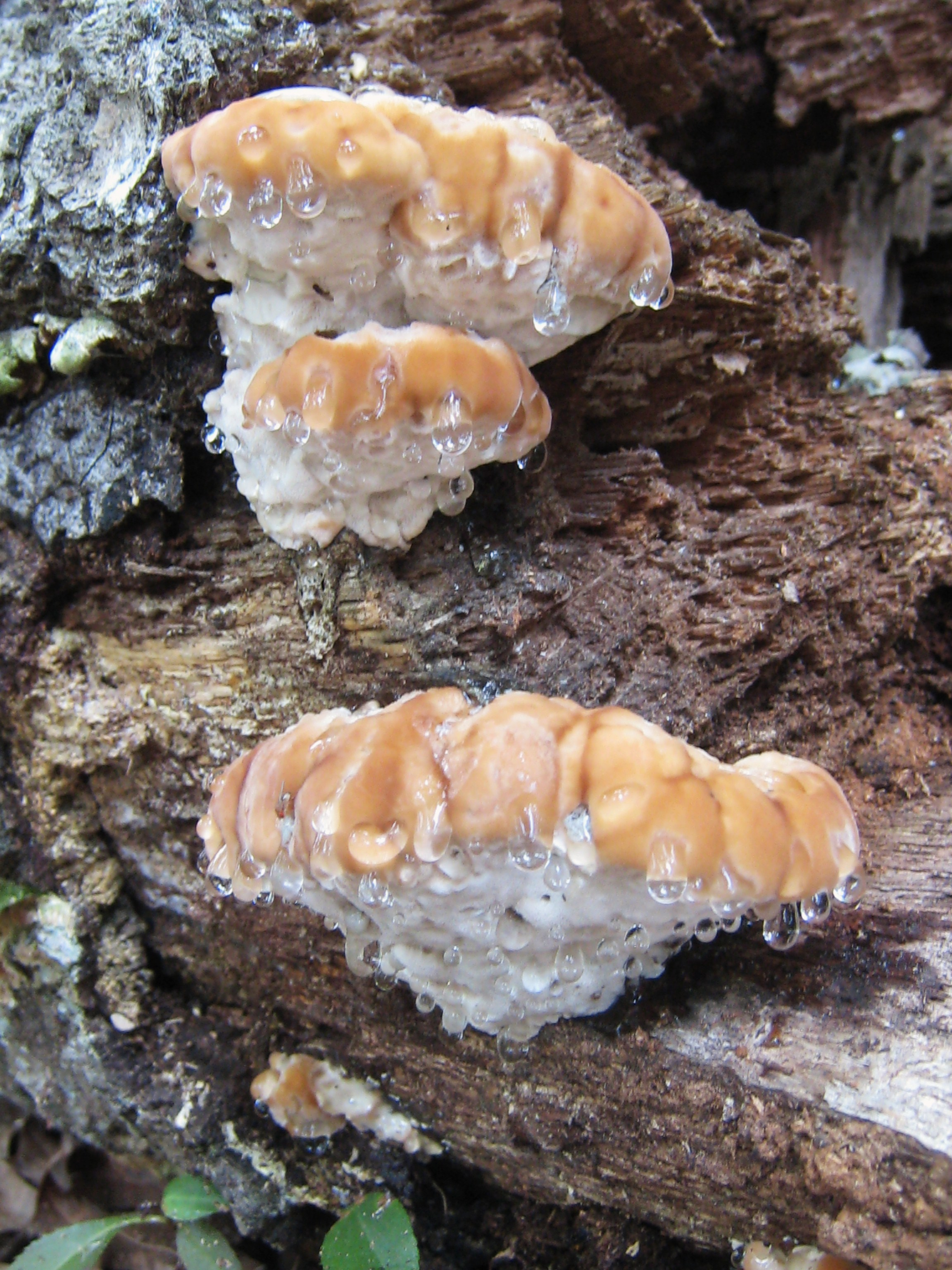
Niveoporofomes spraguei

== Genera ==
- Amylocystis
- Antrodia
- Auriporia
- Buglossoporus
- Climacocystis
- Coriolellus
- Dacryobolus
- Daedalea
- Donkioporia
- Fibroporia
- Fomitella
- Fomitopsis
- Fragifomes
- Gilbertsonia
- Ischnoderma
- Laetiporus
- Laricifomes
- Lasiochlaena
- Neolentiporus
- Niveoporofomes
- Oligoporus
- Osteina
- Parmastomyces
- Phaeolus
- Pilatoporus
- Piptoporus
- Piptoporellus
- Pseudofibroporia
- Ptychogaster
- Pycnoporellus
- Postia
- Rhodofomitopsis
- Rhodonia
- Rubellofomes
- Spelaeomyces
- Ungulidaedalea
- Xylostroma

In a proposed family-level classification of the Polyporales based on molecular phylogenetics, Alfredo Justo and colleagues accept 14 genera in the Fomitopsidaceae: Anthoporia, Antrodia, Buglossoporus, Cartilosoma, Daedalea, Fomitopsis, Fragifomes, Melanoporia, Neolentiporus, Niveoporofomes, Rhodofomes, Rhodofomitopsis, Rubellofomes, and Ungulidaedalea.
