= Sebipora =

Scientific classification
- Kingdom: Fungi
- Division: Basidiomycota
- Class: Agaricomycetes
- Order: Polyporales
- Family: Gelatoporiaceae
- Genus: Sebipora; Miettinen (2012)

Type species
- Sebipora aquosa Miettinen (2012)

Genus of fungi

Sebipora is a fungal genus in the family Gelatoporiaceae. It was circumscribed in 2012 by mycologist Otto Miettinen to contain the crust fungus Sebipora aquosa, its single species. This fungus is found in low altitudes in Sumatra and New Guinea, where it causes a white rot on dead angiosperm wood, particularly fallen tree trunks, and frequently on burned wood.

Sebipora aquosa has a monomitic hyphal system (containing only generative hyphae), and thin-walled, cylindrical spores measuring 5.7–7.6 by 2.1–2.7 μm and containing one or two oil drops. Cystidia and cystidioles are absent from the hymenium.

The binomial name, which combines the Latin words sebum ("tallow") and aquosus ("watery"), refers to the appearance of fresh fruit bodies. Sebiporia is grouped in the Cinereomyces clade. This clade, which groups phylogenetically outside of the "core polyporoid clade", contains the related genera Gelatoporia, Obba, and Cinereomyces. The genus was formally transferred to the new family Gelatoporiaceae in 2017.
