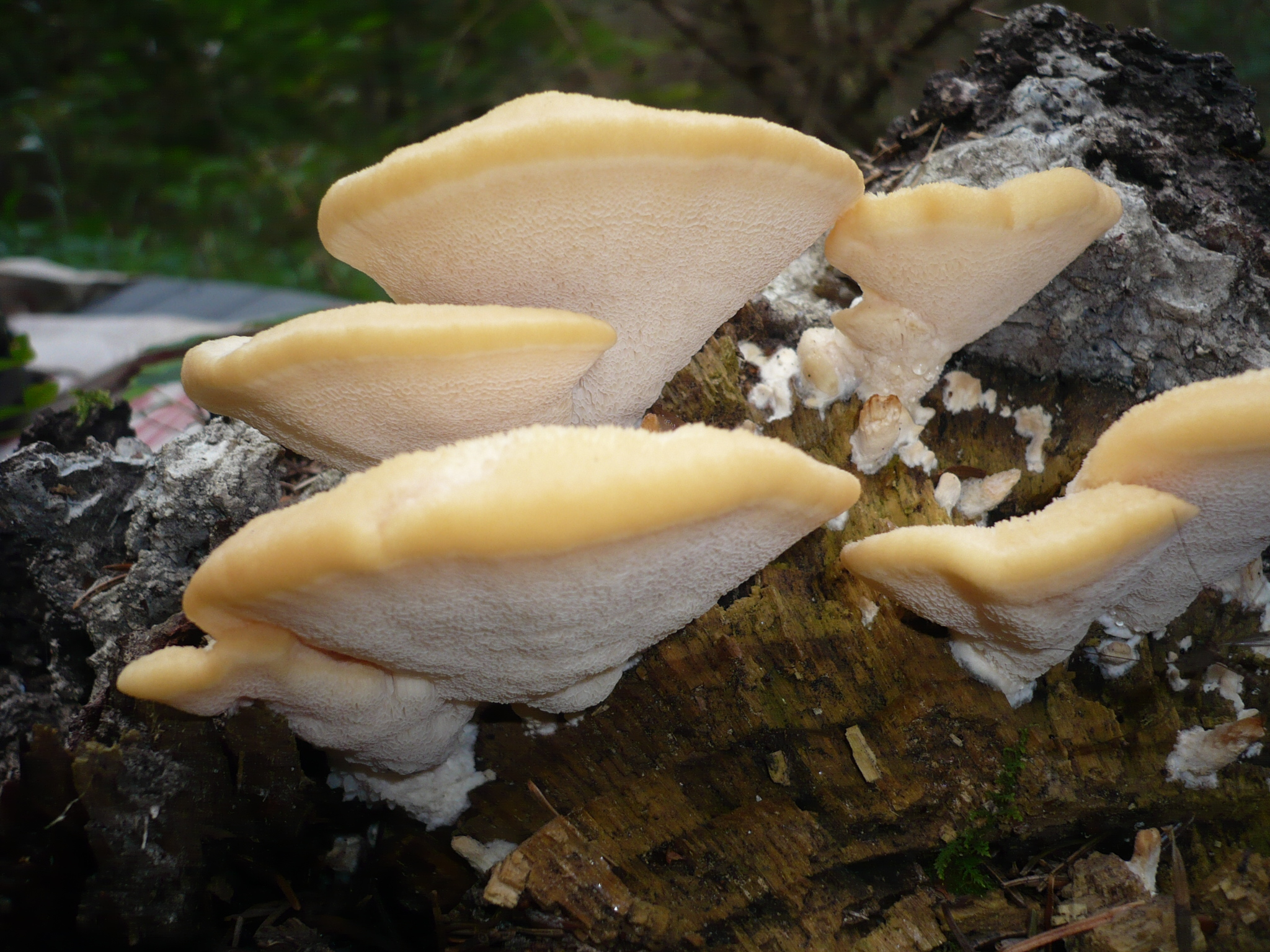

Conservation status
- Apparently Secure (NatureServe)

Scientific classification
- Kingdom: Fungi
- Division: Basidiomycota
- Class: Agaricomycetes
- Order: Polyporales
- Family: Climacocystaceae
- Genus: Climacocystis
- Species: C. borealis

Binomial name
- Climacocystis borealis (Fr.) Kotl. & Pouzar (1958)

Synonyms
- Polyporus borealis Fr. (1821)

= Climacocystis borealis =

Species of fungus

Climacocystis borealis is a species of poroid fungus in the family Climacocystaceae.

== Taxonomy ==
First described in 1821 by Swedish mycologist Elias Magnus Fries, it has since acquired an extensive synonymy of alternate scientific names. Until 2014, it was the sole member of the Climacocystis, a genus circumscribed by Czech mycologists František Kotlaba and Zdeněk Pouzar in 1958, when the newly described Chinese species Climacocystis montana was added to the genus.

== Description ==
Climacocystis borealis is both a saprophyte and a secondary pathogen that causes a heart rot in the roots and bole of host trees.

The fruiting bodies attach directly to the wood, usually in single brackets but sometimes joined. The caps are whitish to yellowish, 5–15 centimetres (2–6 in) wide and 2–5 cm (3/4–2 in) thick, with no stipe. The whitish flesh is juicy closer to the margins. The spore print is white.

=== Similar species ===
Many Polyporales genera include similar polypores, typically smaller than those of Climacocystis. Similar species include Postia tephroleuca, Spongipellis delectans and Tyromyces chioneus.

== Distribution and habitat ==
It is widely distributed, and has been recorded from Eurasia, Oceania, and North America. In China, it is found in Shanxi, Guangdong, Sichuan, and Tibet. It can be found on the base of conifer trees.

== Toxicity ==
It is not edible by humans.
