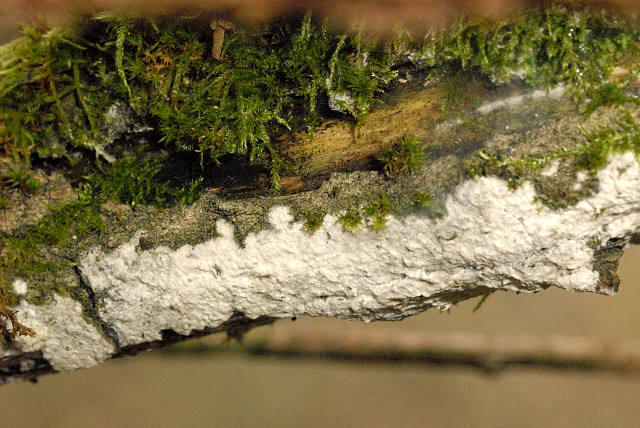
- Hyphoderma praetermissum

Scientific classification
- Kingdom: Fungi
- Division: Basidiomycota
- Class: Agaricomycetes
- Order: Polyporales
- Family: Hyphodermataceae
- Genus: Hyphoderma; Wallr. (1833)

Type species
- Hyphoderma spiculosum Wallr. (1833)

Synonyms
- Kneiffia Fr. (1836); Lyomyces P.Karst. (1881); Kneiffiella Underw. (1897); Kneiffiella Henn. (1898); Neokneiffia Sacc. (1898); Pycnodon Underw. (1898); Metulodontia Parmasto (1968)

= Hyphoderma =

Genus of fungi

Hyphoderma is a genus of crust fungi in the family Hyphodermataceae. It was circumscribed by German botanist Karl Friedrich Wilhelm Wallroth in 1833.

== Species ==
As of June 2017, Index Fungorum accepts 102 species of Hyphoderma:

- Hyphoderma acutatum Hjortstam & Ryvarden (2007) – Venezuela
- Hyphoderma acutocystis Boidin & Gilles (1991)
- Hyphoderma acystidiatum Sheng H.Wu (1997)
- Hyphoderma africanum (Burt) D.A.Reid (1975)
- Hyphoderma amoenum (Burt) Donk (1957)
- Hyphoderma anasaziense Lindsey (1986)
- Hyphoderma anthracophilum (Bourdot) Jülich (1974)
- Hyphoderma assimile (H.S.Jacks. & Dearden) Donk (1957)
- Hyphoderma ayresii (Berk. ex Cooke) Boidin & Gilles (1991) – Mauritius; Taiwan
- Hyphoderma bicystidiatum Priyanka & Dhingra (2012)
- Hyphoderma bisetigerum Boidin & Gilles (2004)
- Hyphoderma bresadolae Jülich (1974)
- Hyphoderma budingtonii Lindsey & Gilb. (1977)
- Hyphoderma caliciferum (Litsch.) Malençon & Bertault (1973)
- Hyphoderma cinnamomeum Jülich (1978)
- Hyphoderma clarusproprietas Dhingra (1989)
- Hyphoderma clavatum Sheng H.Wu (1997)
- Hyphoderma cremeoalbum (Höhn. & Litsch.) Jülich (1974) – Europe
- Hyphoderma cremeum Sheng H.Wu (1997)
- Hyphoderma cristulatum (Fr.) Donk (1957) – Great Britain
- Hyphoderma crustulinum (Bres.) Nakasone (2008)
- Hyphoderma cryptocallimon B.de Vries (1987) – Great Britain
- Hyphoderma cynodontis Sawada (1959) – Taiwan
- Hyphoderma definitum (H.S.Jacks.) Donk (1957) – Great Britain
- Hyphoderma densum Sheng H.Wu (1997)
- Hyphoderma densustextum Dhingra (1989)
- Hyphoderma deserticola Gilb. & Lindsey (1975)
- Hyphoderma deviatum (S.Lundell) Parmasto (1968) – Portugal
- Hyphoderma effractum Hjortstam (1998) – Brunei
- Hyphoderma etruriae Bernicchia (1993)
- Hyphoderma formosanum Yurchenko & Sheng H.Wu (2014)
- Hyphoderma fuscum (Burt) Donk (1957)
- Hyphoderma galactinum Manjón, G.Moreno & Hjortstam (1988)
- Hyphoderma gemmeum (D.P.Rogers) Donk (1957)
- Hyphoderma gigasporum Boidin & Gilles (1991)
- Hyphoderma granuliferum P.Roberts (2000) – Cameroon
- Hyphoderma hallenbergii Man.Kaur, Avneet P. Singh & Dhingra (2015)
- Hyphoderma hjortstamii Sheng H.Wu (1990) – Taiwan
- Hyphoderma iguazuense Hjortstam & Ryvarden (1986)
- Hyphoderma incrustatum K.H.Larss. (1998)
- Hyphoderma inusitatum (H.S.Jacks. & Dearden) Ginns (1984)
- Hyphoderma involutum (H.S.Jacks. & Dearden) Hjortstam & Ryvarden (1979)
- Hyphoderma karstenii Jülich (1974)
- Hyphoderma laplata Lindsey (1986)
- Hyphoderma lapponicum (Litsch.) Ryvarden (1971)
- Hyphoderma leoninum Burds. & Nakasone (1983)
- Hyphoderma leptaleum (Ellis & Everh.) Ginns (1992)
- Hyphoderma litschaueri (Burt) J.Erikss. & Å.Strid (1975) – Great Britain; Taiwan
- Hyphoderma lunasporum Gilb. & Hemmes (2004)
- Hyphoderma luridum (Bourdot & Galzin) J.Erikss. & Hjortstam (1976)
- Hyphoderma macaronesicum Tellería, M.Dueñas, Beltrán-Tej., Rodr.-Armas & M.P.Martín (2012)
- Hyphoderma malenconii (Manjón & G.Moreno) Manjón, G.Moreno & Hjortstam (1988)
- Hyphoderma medioburiense (Burt) Donk (1957) – Europe
- Hyphoderma microcystidium Sheng H.Wu (1990)
- Hyphoderma moniliforme (P.H.B.Talbot) Manjón, G.Moreno & Hjortstam (1988)
- Hyphoderma montanum (Burt) Donk (1957)
- Hyphoderma multicystidiatum Ryvarden (1978)
- Hyphoderma multicystidium (Hjortstam & Ryvarden) Hjortstam & Tellería (1990)
- Hyphoderma naiophila Gilb. & Hemmes (2001)
- Hyphoderma nemorale K.H.Larss. (1998)
- Hyphoderma nualoloense Gilb. & Hemmes (2004)
- Hyphoderma nudicephalum Gilb. & M.Blackw. (1988)
- Hyphoderma obtusiforme J.Erikss. & Å.Strid (1975) – Great Britain
- Hyphoderma obtusum J.Erikss. (1958) – Great Britain
- Hyphoderma occidentale (D.P.Rogers) Boidin & Gilles (1994) – Great Britai
- Hyphoderma odontioides (Burt) Donk (1957)
- Hyphoderma orphanellum (Bourdot & Galzin) Donk (1957) – Great Britain
- Hyphoderma parvisporum Avn.P.Singh, Priyanka, Dhingra & Singla (2010)
- Hyphoderma pilisetum (Burt) Liberta (1968)
- Hyphoderma pilosum (Burt) Gilb. & Budington (1970)
- Hyphoderma pinicola Yurchenko & Sheng H.Wu (2014) – China
- Hyphoderma pleurobasidiatum Boidin, Cand. & Gilles (1986)
- Hyphoderma probatum (H.S.Jacks.) Jülich (1974)
- Hyphoderma prosopidis (Burds.) Tellería, M.Dueñas & M.P.Martín (2012)
- Hyphoderma rimosum Burds. & Nakasone (1983)
- Hyphoderma rimulosum Sheng H.Wu (1997) – Taiwan
- Hyphoderma romeroae C.E.Gómez, Baltazar & Rajchenb. (2014)
- Hyphoderma roseocremeum (Bres.) Donk (1957) – Europe
- Hyphoderma rubropallens (Schwein.) Ginns (1992)
- Hyphoderma rubropunctatum Warcup & P.H.B.Talbot (1965)
- Hyphoderma sabinicum Manjón & G.Moreno (1983)
- Hyphoderma sacchari (Burt) Nakasone (2000)
- Hyphoderma scaevolae Boidin & Gilles (1991)
- Hyphoderma setigerum (Fr.) Donk (1957) - widespread
- Hyphoderma sibiricum (Parmasto) J.Erikss. & Å.Strid (1975) – Europe
- Hyphoderma sikkimium Dhingra (1989)
- Hyphoderma singularibasidium Dhingra, Avn.P.Singh & Singla (2009)
- Hyphoderma sphaeropedunculatum Gilb. & Hemmes (2001)
- Hyphoderma sporulosum Dhingra (1989)
- Hyphoderma subclavatum Sheng H.Wu (1997)
- Hyphoderma subclavigerum K.H.Larss. & Hjortstam (1978)
- Hyphoderma subglobosum Priyanka & Dhingra (2012)
- Hyphoderma subsetigerum Sheng H.Wu (1997)
- Hyphoderma subsphaerosporum Boidin & Gilles (1991)
- Hyphoderma tenue (Pat.) Donk (1957 – Great Britain)
- Hyphoderma tibia K.H.Larss., Grosse-Brauckm. & Jean Keller (1998)
- Hyphoderma transiens (Bres.) Parmasto (1968) – Great Britain
- Hyphoderma tuberculare Hjortstam & Ryvarden (1982)
- Hyphoderma tubulicystidium Hjortstam & Spooner (2009) – Australia
- Hyphoderma typhicola (Burt) Donk (1962)
- Hyphoderma utriculosum (G.Cunn.) Stalpers & P.K.Buchanan (1991)
- Hyphoderma variolosum Boidin, Lanq. & Gilles (1991)
- Hyphoderma zeylanica Petch (1917) – Sri Lanka
