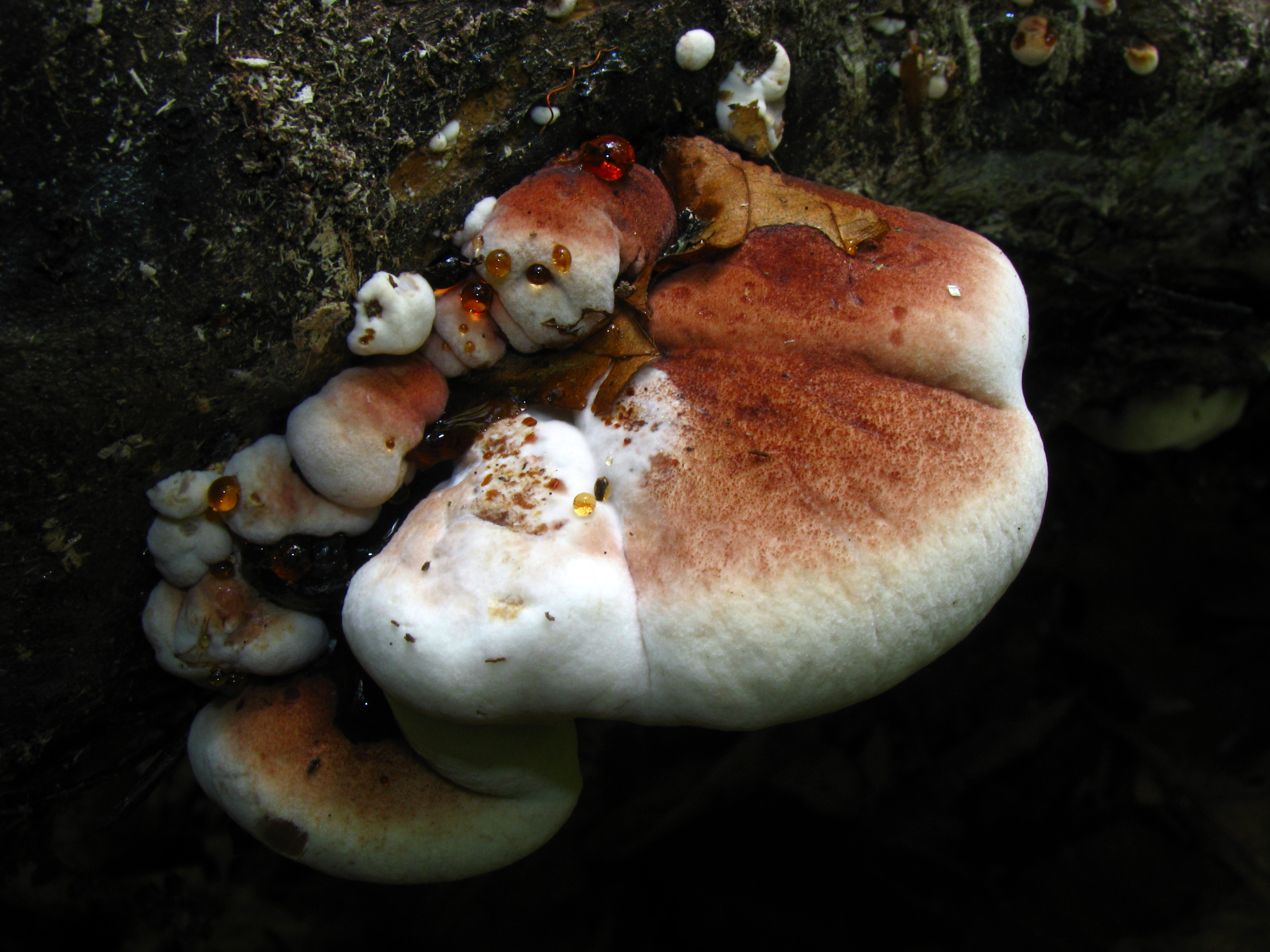

Scientific classification
- Kingdom: Fungi
- Division: Basidiomycota
- Class: Agaricomycetes
- Order: Polyporales
- Family: Ischnodermataceae
- Genus: Ischnoderma
- Species: I. resinosum

Binomial name
- Ischnoderma resinosum (Schrad.) P.Karst. (1879)

= Ischnoderma resinosum =

Species of fungus

Ischnoderma resinosum
- Mycological characteristics
- Pores on hymenium
- No distinct cap
- Hymenium attachment is irregular or not applicable
- Lacks a stipe
- Spore print is white
- Ecology is saprotrophic
- Edibility is edible or too hard to eat

Ischnoderma resinosum is a species of fungus in the family Ischnodermataceae. It is commonly known as the resinous polypore, late fall polypore, or benzoin bracket.

== Taxonomy ==
The species was originally described as Boletus resinosus in 1794 by German botanist Heinrich Schrader. It has acquired an extensive synonymy in its taxonomic history, having been juggled between several genera. Petter Karsten transferred it to Ischnoderma in 1879 to give it the name by which it is currently known.

== Description ==
This shelf mushroom is 7–30 cm (3–12 in) across, velvety, dark red/brown, darkening and forming zones in age. The whitish to brownish flesh is watery when young and corky with age. It is sweet smelling.

Ischnoderma benzoinum is similar and has darker flesh.

== Habitat and distribution ==
This fungus fruits on hardwood logs and stumps in autumn. A widely distributed species, it has been recorded from Africa, Asia, Europe, and North America.

== Uses ==
Young, soft specimens may be cooked and eaten, but the species becomes hard and unpalatable in age.
