= Intextomyces =

Scientific classification
- Domain: Eukaryota
- Kingdom: Fungi
- Division: Basidiomycota
- Class: Agaricomycetes
- Order: Polyporales
- Family: Hyphodermataceae
- Genus: Intextomyces; J.Erikss. & Ryvarden

Genus of fungi

Intextomyces is a genus of fungi belonging to the family Hyphodermataceae.

The genus has almost cosmopolitan distribution.

Species:

- Intextomyces aureus (Ryvarden) Hjortstam
- Intextomyces contiguus (P.Karst.) J.Erikss. & Ryvarden
- Intextomyces cystidiatus Hjortstam
- Intextomyces umbrinus (Bres.) Hjortstam & Ryvarden
