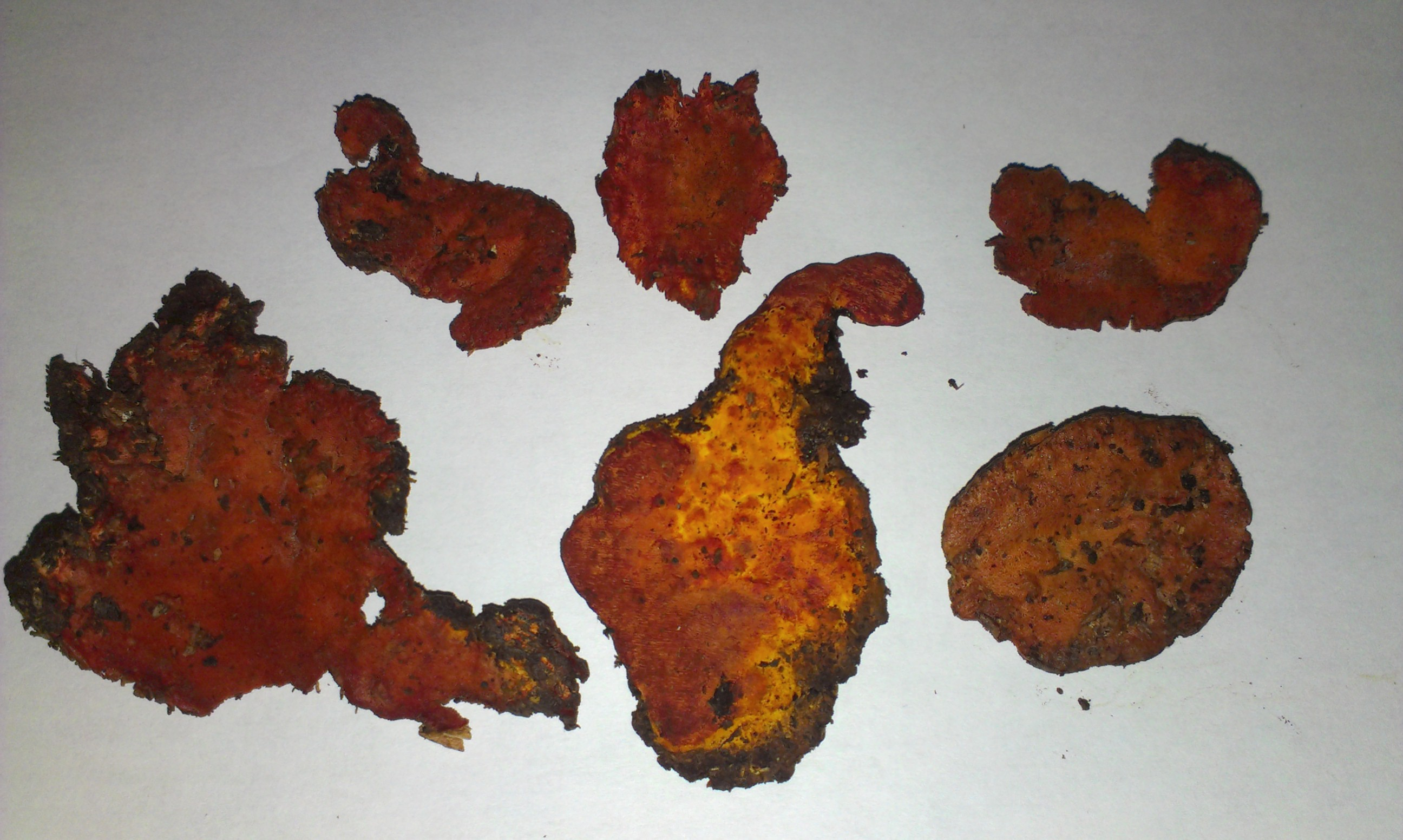

Scientific classification
- Kingdom: Fungi
- Division: Basidiomycota
- Class: Agaricomycetes
- Order: Polyporales
- Genus: Taiwanofungus
- Species: T. camphoratus

Binomial name
- Taiwanofungus camphoratus (M.Zang & C.H.Su) Sheng H.Wu, Z.H.Yu, Y.C.Dai & C.H.Su (as comphoratus) (1994)

Synonyms
- List: Antrodia camphorata (M.Zang & C.H.Su) Sheng H.Wu, Ryvarden & T.T.Chang (1997); Antrodia cinnamomea T.T. Chang & W.N. Chou (1995); Ganoderma camphoratum M.Zang & C.H.Su (1990); Ganoderma comphoratus; Taiwanofungus comphoratus

= Taiwanofungus camphoratus =

Species of fungus

Taiwanofungus camphoratus, also known as stout camphor fungus, is a species of fungus that is endemic to Taiwan, where it grows only on the endemic aromatic tree Cinnamomum kanehirae, causing a brown heart rot.

== Traditional medicine ==
It is used in Taiwanese traditional medicine as a purported remedy for cancer, hypertension, and hangover. The annual market is worth over $100 million (US) in Taiwan alone. The 32.15 Mb genome containing 9,254 genes has been sequenced.

Taiwanofungus camphoratus has been found to produce anti-obesogenic, anti-inflammatory and antidiabetic effects in high-fat diet-fed mice.

== Chemical constituents ==
Antcin B, antrodioxolanone, antrocamphin B, antroquinonol, antrocamphins, zhankuic acids, and other antcins have been reported as constituents of Taiwanofungus camphoratus.

== Ecological concern ==
Because of its use as an herbal remedy, fruiting bodies of the fungus can fetch high prices. Good quality fruiting bodies were reported to cost as much as US$15,000/kg in 1997, before artificial cultivation methods were developed. Some have illegally farmed the fungus in the forests of Taiwan by hollowing out endangered stout camphor trees (Cinnamomum kanehirae). This is despite the equal potency of T. camphotatus grown in a laboratory.
