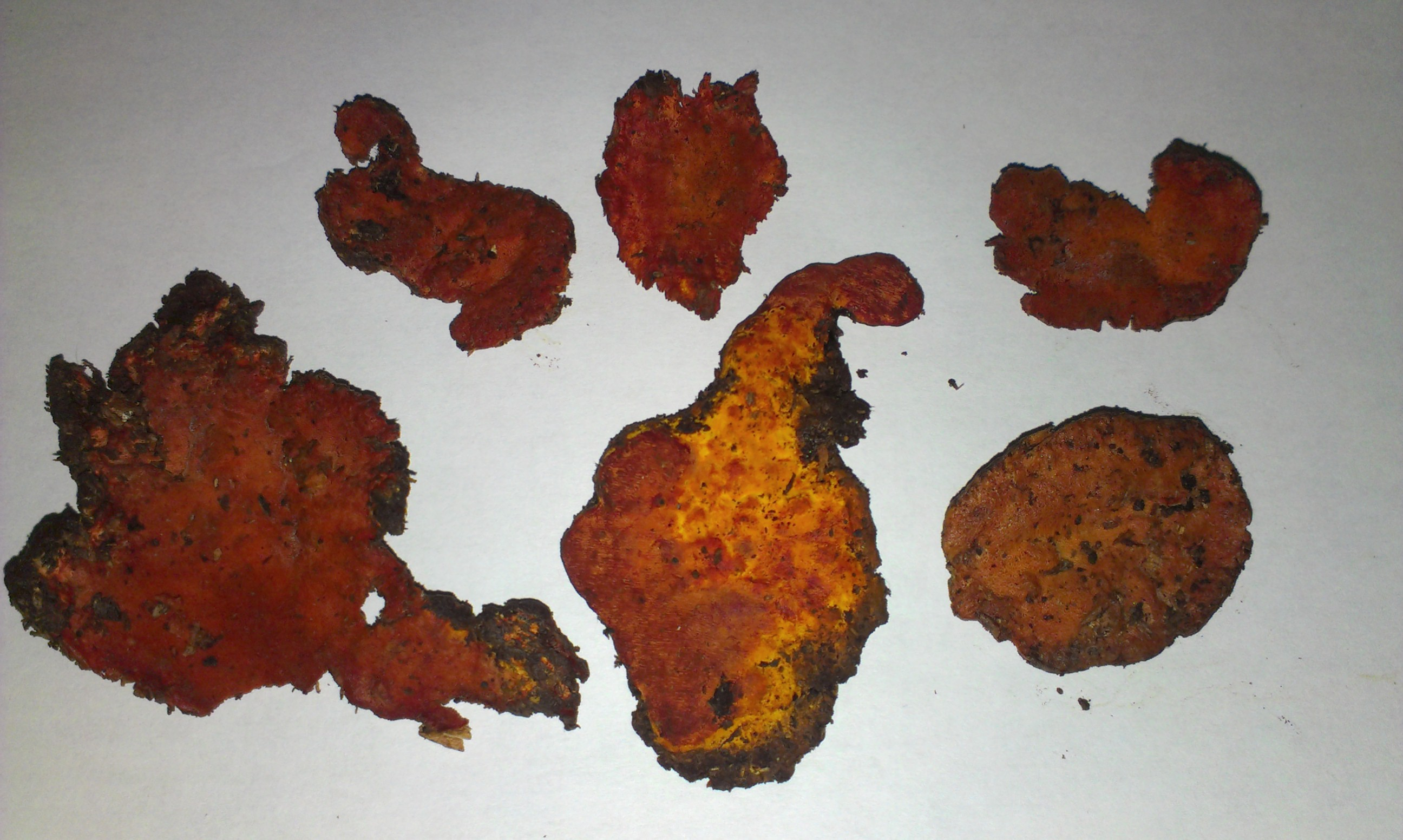

Scientific classification
- Kingdom: Fungi
- Division: Basidiomycota
- Class: Agaricomycetes
- Order: Polyporales
- Family: incertae sedis
- Genus: Taiwanofungus; Sheng H.Wu, Z.H.Yu, Y.C.Dai & C.H.Su (2004)

Type species
- Taiwanofungus camphoratus (M.Zang & C.H.Su) Sheng H.Wu, Z.H.Yu, Y.C.Dai & C.H.Su (2004)

Species
- T. camphoratus; T. salmoneus

= Taiwanofungus =

Genus of fungi

Taiwanofungus is a fungal genus of unknown familial placement in the order Polyporales. The genus contains two species: the type, Taiwanofungus camphoratus, and T. salmoneus. Taiwanofungus was circumscribed by Taiwanese mycologists in 2004. T. camphoratus is a medicinal fungus that is found in Taiwan, where it grows on the endemic tree species Cinnamomum kanehirae. It was first described in 1990 by Mu Zang and Ching-Hua Su as a species of Ganoderma. T. salmoneus, originally placed in Antrodia, was validly added to the genus in 2012.
