= Obba rivulosa =

Scientific classification
- Domain: Eukaryota
- Kingdom: Fungi
- Division: Basidiomycota
- Class: Agaricomycetes
- Order: Polyporales
- Family: Gelatoporiaceae
- Genus: Obba
- Species: O. rivulosa

Binomial name
- Obba rivulosa (Berk. & M.A.Curtis) Miettinen & Rajchenb. (2012)

Synonyms
- Polyporus rivulosus Berk. & M.A.Curtis (1869); Poria rivulosa (Berk. & M.A.Curtis) Cooke (1886); Rigidoporus rivulosus (Berk. & M.A.Curtis) A.David (1972); Physisporinus rivulosus (Berk. & M.A.Curtis) Ryvarden (1984); Ceriporiopsis rivulosa (Berk. & M.A.Curtis) Gilb. & Ryvarden (1986); Poria albipellucida D.V.Baxter (1938)

Species of fungus

Obba rivulosa is a species of crust fungus in the family Gelatoporiaceae. It is found in the Caribbean, Europe, North America, and South America. Its genome sequence was reported in 2016.
