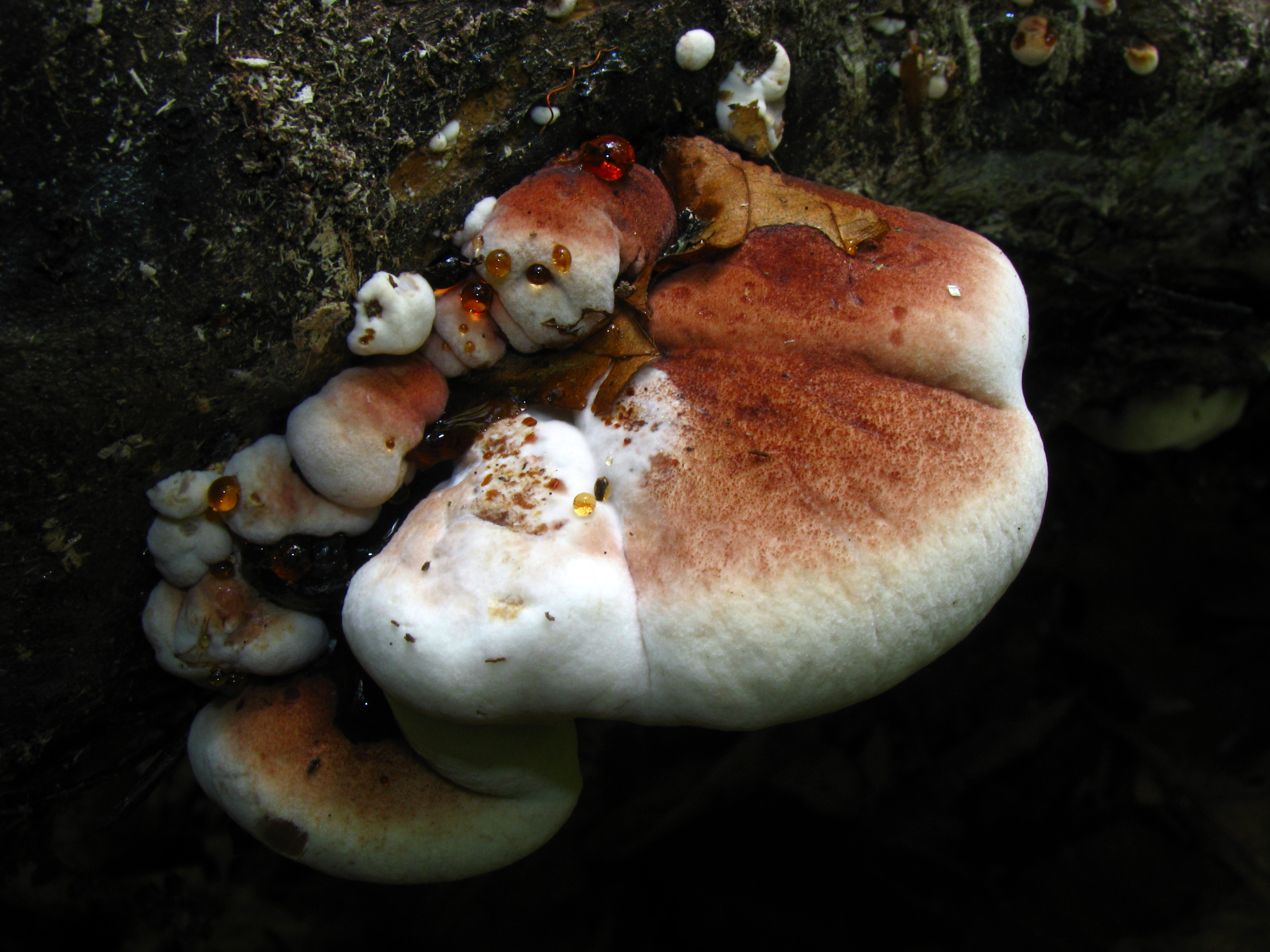
- Ischnoderma resinosum

Scientific classification
- Kingdom: Fungi
- Division: Basidiomycota
- Class: Agaricomycetes
- Order: Polyporales
- Family: Ischnodermataceae; Jülich
- Genus: Ischnoderma; P.Karst. (1879)

Type species
- Ischnoderma resinosum (Schrad.) P.Karst. (1879)

Synonyms
- Lasiochlaena Pouzar (1990)

= Ischnoderma =

Genus of fungi

Ischnoderma is a genus of polypore fungi. Species in the genus have dark brown and tomentose fruit bodies that become darker brown to black and smooth when mature. The genus, widespread in temperate regions, contains an estimated 10 species.

== Taxonomy ==
Ischnoderma was circumscribed by Finnish mycologist Petter Adolf Karsten in 1879. Although Ischnoderma has traditionally been classified in the family Fomitopsidaceae, Phylogenetic studies have demonstrated its isolated phylogenetic position in the Polyporales. Justo and colleagues suggest that Ischnoderma would be better placed as the type genus of Ischnodermataceae, a family originally proposed by Walter Jülich in 1981. The generic name Ischnoderma combines the Ancient Greek words ισχνός ("dry") and δέρμα ("skin").

== Chemistry ==
The type species, I. resinosum, is used in mushroom dyeing to produce various shades of brown. It has been shown to efficiently decolorize several structurally different synthetic dyes: amaranth, Remazol Brilliant Blue R, Phthalocyanine Blue BN, and Poly R-478. Ischnoderma benzoinum has antiviral activity against type A influenza virus of birds and humans.

== Uses ==
Young, fleshy specimens of both I. resinosum and I. benzoinum may be cooked and eaten, but the species can become hard and inedible later in life.

== Species ==
- Ischnoderma albotextum (Lloyd) D.A.Reid (1973)
- Ischnoderma benzoinum (Wahlenb.) P.Karst. (1881)
- Ischnoderma brasiliense Corner (1989)– Brazil
- Ischnoderma friabile Corner (1989) – Papua New Guinea
- Ischnoderma fuscum (Pilát) Rauschert (1990)
- Ischnoderma novo-guineense Imazeki (1952) – Japan
- Ischnoderma porphyrites Corner (1989) – Brazil
- Ischnoderma resinosum (Schrad.) P.Karst. (1879)
- Ischnoderma rosulatum (G.Cunn.) P.K.Buchanan & Ryvarden (1988) – New Zealand
- Ischnoderma solomonense Corner (1989) – South Solomons
