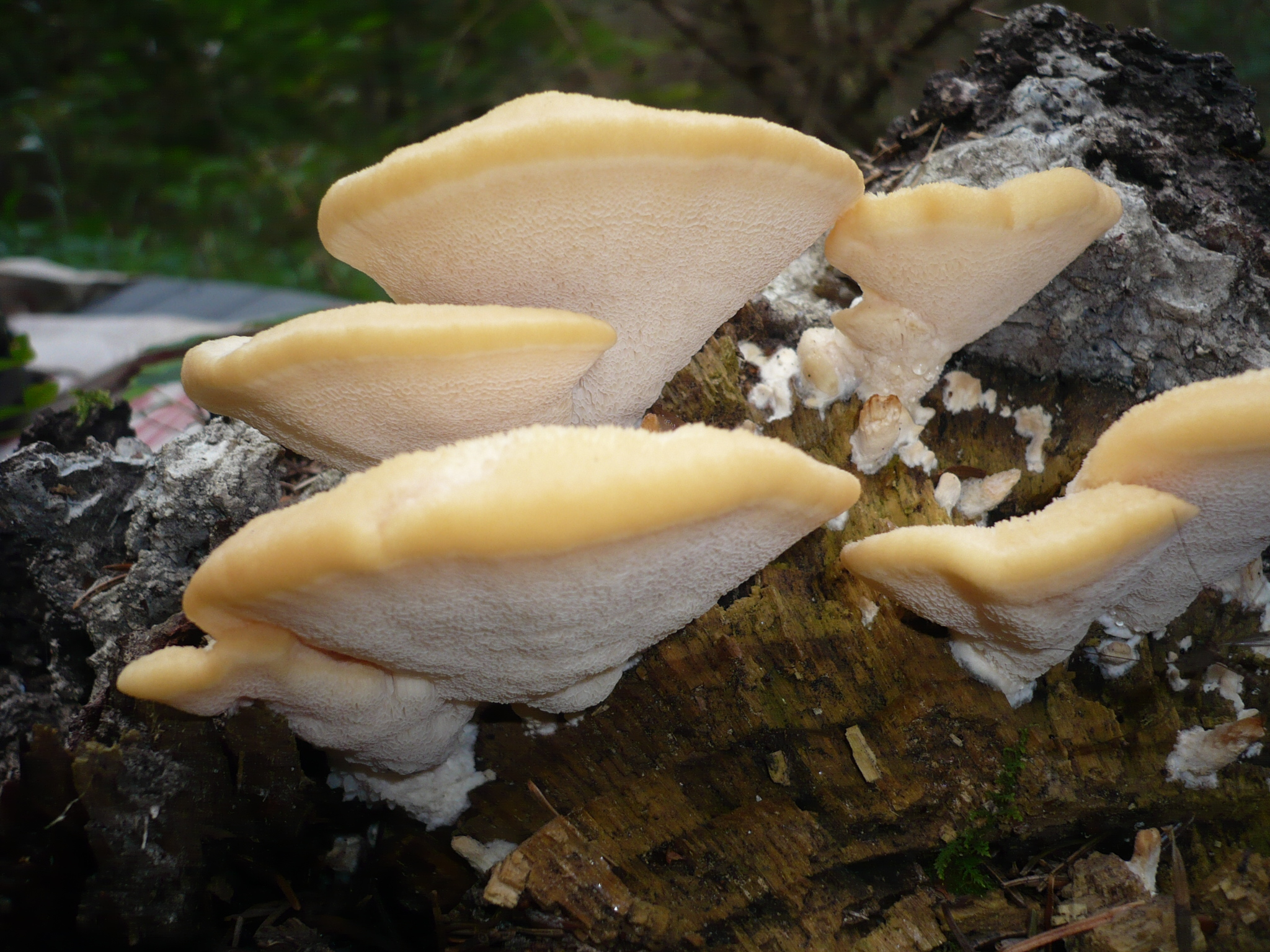
- Climacocystis borealis

Scientific classification
- Kingdom: Fungi
- Division: Basidiomycota
- Class: Agaricomycetes
- Order: Polyporales
- Family: Climacocystaceae
- Genus: Climacocystis; Kotl. & Pouzar (1958)

Type species
- Polyporus borealis Fr. (1821)

Species
- C. borealis C. montana

= Climacocystis =

Genus of fungi

Climacocystis is a genus of poroid fungi in the family Climacocystaceae. Until recently, it was monotypic genus, containing the single widespread species Climacocystis borealis. In 2014, Chinese mycologists added the newly described species Climacocystis montana. The generic name combines the name Climacodon with the Ancient Greek word χύστιζ ("bladder").
