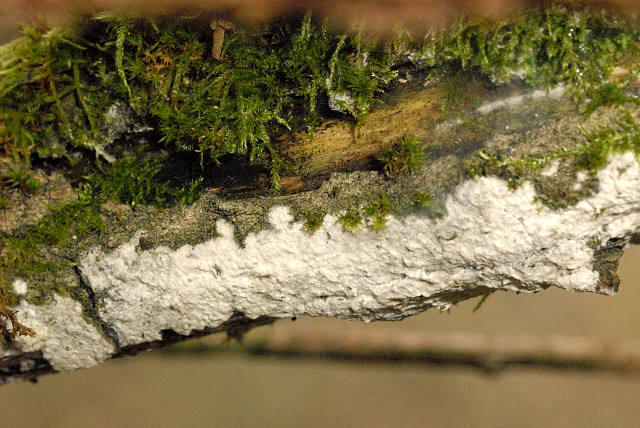
- Hyphoderma praetermissum, member of the Hyphodermataceae

Scientific classification
- Kingdom: Fungi
- Division: Basidiomycota
- Class: Agaricomycetes
- Order: Polyporales
- Family: Hyphodermataceae; Jülich (1982)

Genera
- Hyphoderma; Intextomyces

= Hyphodermataceae =

Family of fungi

The Hyphodermataceae are a family of fungi in the order Polyporales. It contains the genera Hyphoderma and Intextomyces.
