= Obba (fungus) =

Scientific classification
- Domain: Eukaryota
- Kingdom: Fungi
- Division: Basidiomycota
- Class: Agaricomycetes
- Order: Polyporales
- Family: Gelatoporiaceae
- Genus: Obba; Miettinen & Rajchenb. (2012)

Type species
- Obba valdiviana (Rajchenb.) Miettinen & Rajchenb. (2012)

Species
- O. rivulosa O. thailandica O. valdiviana

Genus of fungi

Obba is a genus of three species of poroid, white rot crust fungi in the family Gelatoporiaceae. The genome sequence of the type species, O. rivulosa, was reported in 2016.

== Taxonomy ==
The genus was circumscribed in 2012 by mycologists Otto Miettinen and Mario Rajchenberg. The three species are members of the Cinereomyces clade, a grouping of phylogenetically related fungi distinct from the core polyporoid clade. O. rivulosa was introduced to science by Miles Joseph Berkeley and Moses Ashley Curtis in 1869 as Polyporus rivulosus. The type species, O. valdiviana, was originally described as a variety of Ceriporiopsis rivulosa by Rajchenberg in 1995. The genus was formally transferred to the new family Gelatoporiaceae in 2017.

The generic name Obba alludes to the similarity of the bottle-shaped cystidioles characteristic of the genus to the household containers for liquids used in Rome.

== Description ==
Obba species have crust-like fruit bodies that are white (when young) or cream to ochre (when dry). They range in length from a few millimetres up to 13 cm (5.1 in) long, and are about 3 mm thick. Obba has a monomitic hyphal system, containing only generative hyphae, and these hyphae have clamp connections.

== Habitat and distribution ==
Obba causes a white rot in the trunks of both gymnosperms and angiosperms. Obba species have been recorded in subtropical and boreal zones. O. valdiviana occurs in southern Argentina and Chile, and has been recorded a couple of times from Australia. O. rivulosa is found in the Caribbean, Europe, North America, and South America. O. thailandica was described from Thailand in 2017. It was found growing on charred pine wood.
