= Zhankuic acid =

Group of chemical compounds

Zhankuic acids are sterols isolated from the fungi Taiwanofungus camphoratus, also known by the synonym Antrodia cinnamomea. They are chemically classified as triterpenoids, which are triterpenes with heteroatoms. At least six Zhankuic acids, labelled from A to F, have been discovered and documented in scientific literature.

Zhankuic acids are the subjects of research interests, particularly due to their cytotoxic nature. They have hence been studied against cancerous cell lines, particularly leukemia cell lines. Zhankuic acid A has also been modeled to be a selective TLR4/MD-2 antagonist in silico, which could potentially help treat gram-negative bacterial infections.

Chemicals in the zhankuic acid family
Compound	Zhankuic acid A	Zhankuic acid B	Zhankuic acid C	Zhankuic acid D
Structure				
PubChem CID	10004842	53323940	53318662	101694476
ChemSpider	8180422	26375603	26381196	
