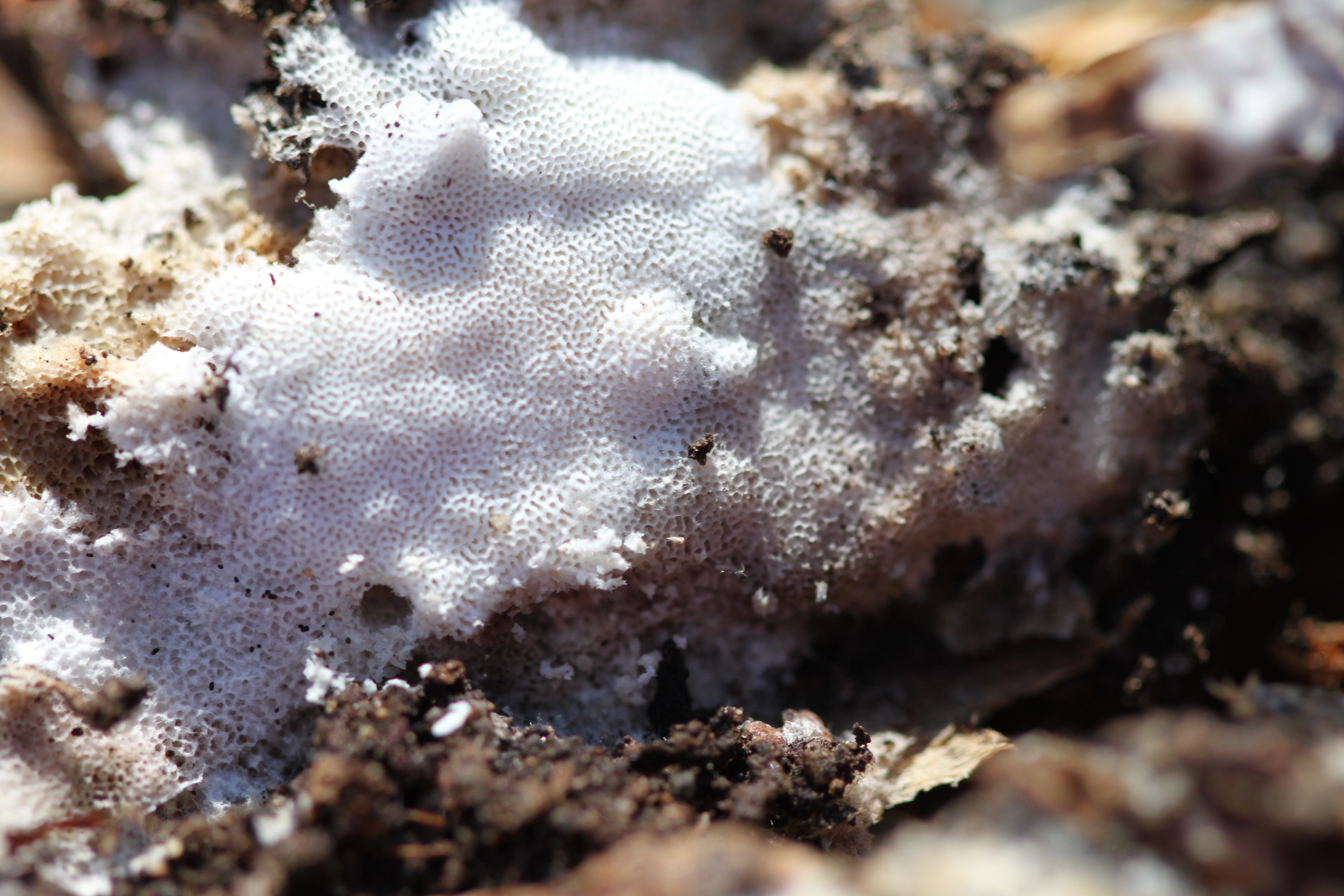
- Cinereomyces lindbladii

Scientific classification
- Kingdom: Fungi
- Division: Basidiomycota
- Class: Agaricomycetes
- Order: Polyporales
- Family: Gelatoporiaceae; Miettinen, Justo & Hibbett (2017)

Type genus
- Gelatoporia Niemelä (1985)

Genera
- Cinereomyces; Gelatoporia; Obba; Sebipora

= Gelatoporiaceae =

Family of fungi

The Gelatoporiaceae are a small family of crust fungi in the order Polyporales. The family was circumscribed in 2017 by mycologists Otto Miettinen, Alfredo Justo and David Hibbett to contain the type genus Gelatoporia and three other related genera, Cinereomyces, Obba, and Sebipora.

== Taxonomy ==
In a 2012 publication, Miettinen and Mario Rajchenberg introduced the name "Cinereomyces clade" to accommodate a small group of white-rot polypores of uncertain position in the order Polyporales. Further analyses confirmed that this clade represents a separate lineage from the Polyporaceae. The genus Gelatoporia, upon which the family is based, was defined by Tuomo Niemelä in 1985 to contain poroid crust fungi with a monomitic hyphal structure, clamped hyphae, and producing white rot.

== Description ==
The fruit bodies of the Gelatoporiaceae are crust-like (resupinate), and have a poroid hymenophore. The hyphal system is typically monomitic (containing only generative hyphae), although in genus Cinereomyces it is dimitic (containing both generative and skeletal hyphae). Clamp connections are present in the hyphae. Spores made by the family are hyaline, smooth, and usually thin-walled but they are somewhat thick-walled in genus Obba. They are non-amyloid and non-dextrinoid. Cystidia are absent from the hymenium, although cystidioles may be present. The mating system is heterothallic, bipolar or tetrapolar, while the nuclear behavior is astatocoenocytic.

== Habitat and distribution ==
Gelatoporiaceae fungi are saprophytic, and cause white-rot in coarse woody debris. Many of the species have been reported frequently from burned wood, although none absolutely require it as a substrate. Cinereomyces and Gelatoporia have a temperate-boreal distribution in the Northern Hemisphere; the distribution of Obba is similar but it is also found in the Southern Hemisphere. Sebipora is found in tropical Asia.

== Genera ==
- Cinereomyces Jülich (1982)

C. dilutabilis
C. lindbladii

- Gelatoporia Niemelä (1985)

G. subvermispora

- Obba Miettinen & Rajchenb. (2012)

O. rivulosa
O. thailandica
O. valdiviana

- Sebipora Miettinen (2012)

S. aquosa
