= Antcin B =

Identifiers
CAS Number	163597-25-9
3D model (JSmol)	Interactive image
ChEMBL	ChEMBL1966186
ChemSpider	343353
PubChem CID	387397
- InChI: InChI=1S/C29H40O5/c1-15(17(3)27(33)34)7-8-16(2)19-9-10-20-25-23(31)13-21-18(4)22(30)11-12-28(21,5)26(25)24(32)14-29(19,20)6/h16-21H,1,7-14H2,2-6H3,(H,33,34)/t16?,17?,18-,19?,20?,21?,28?,29?/m0/s1 Key: DVORYMAGXQGBQK-BQPMOXFZSA-N
- SMILES: [H][C@@]1(CC[C@@]2([H])C3=C(C(=O)C[C@]12C)[C@@]1(C)CCC(=O)[C@@H](C)[C@]1([H])CC3=O)[C@H](C)CCC(=C)C(C)C(O)=O

Properties
Chemical formula	C_{29}H_{40}O_{5}
Molar mass	468.634 g·mol^{−1}
- Except where otherwise noted, data are given for materials in their standard state (at 25 °C [77 °F], 100 kPa). Infobox references

Antcin B is a steroid isolated from the mushroom Antrodia camphorata.
