= Fragiliporia =

Scientific classification
- Kingdom: Fungi
- Division: Basidiomycota
- Class: Agaricomycetes
- Order: Polyporales
- Family: Fragiliporiaceae; Y.C.Dai, B.K.Cui & C.L.Zhao (2014)
- Genus: Fragiliporia; Y.C.Dai, B.K.Cui & C.L.Zhao (2014)
- Species: F. fragilis

Binomial name
- Fragiliporia fragilis Y.C.Dai, B.K.Cui & C.L.Zhao (2014)

Genus of fungi

Fragiliporia is the sole genus in the fungus family Fragiliporiaceae. It contains the poroid crust fungus Fragiliporia fragilis, described as new to science by Chinese mycologists in 2014. The type specimen of this fungus was discovered growing on a rotting stump of alder in the Gaoligongshan National Nature Reserve in Yunnan. The specific epithet fragilis refers to the brittle fruit bodies of the fungus. Molecular phylogenetics shows that the fungus is in an isolated position in the Polyporales, distinct from the six previously identified clades in this order. In a later study (2017), Fragiliporia was recovered in a phylogenetically isolated position as sister to Candelabrochaete africana.

== Description ==
Fragiliporia fragilis is a white rot fungus with soft fruit bodies that become powdery and brittle when bruised. It measures up to 15 cm (5.9 in) long by 5 cm (2.0 in) wide by 6 mm (0.24 in) thick at its centre. It has a monomitic hyphal system, containing only generative hyphae that have clamp connections. Its spores are sausage-shaped (allantoid), thin-walled, and hyaline, typically measuring 4.8–5.4 by 1.7–2 μm.
