= Repetobasidiopsis =

Scientific classification
- Kingdom: Fungi
- Division: Basidiomycota
- Class: Agaricomycetes
- Order: Polyporales
- Family: incertae sedis
- Genus: Repetobasidiopsis; Dhingra & Avn.P.Singh (2008)

Type species
- Repetobasidiopsis grandispora Dhingra & Avn.P.Singh (2008)

Genus of fungi

Repetobasidiopsis is a fungal genus of unknown familial placement in the order Polyporales. It contains the crust fungus species Repetobasidiopsis grandispora. The genus and species were first proposed in 2006, but two different herbaria were designated for the types of the two new species described in that publication, in contravention of the rules for describing new species. The specific epithet grandisporus refers to the large-sized spores in comparison with the morphologically similar genus Repetobasidiellum. The generic name Repetobasidiopsis alludes to the proliferating, or repeating, basidia. Two years later the genus was published validly.

Repetobasidiopsis grandispora is found in Eastern Himalaya, India, where it grows on decaying bamboo. It has a monomitic hyphal system with generative hyphae measuring up to 2.3 μm. Its spores are ellipsoidal, non-amyloid, and measure 10–14 by 4.0–5.8 μm.
