= Antrodioxolanone =

Names
- Preferred IUPAC name (4R,5S)-4,5-Dimethyl-4,5-bis[(3,4,6-trimethoxy-2-methylphenyl)ethynyl]-1,3-dioxolan-2-one

Identifiers
CAS Number	945622-09-3
3D model (JSmol)	Interactive image
ChEBI	CHEBI:206867
ChEMBL	ChEMBL229460
ChemSpider	20568907
PubChem CID	16737472
CompTox Dashboard (EPA)	DTXSID801045774
- InChI: InChI=1S/C29H32O9/c1-17-19(21(31-5)15-23(33-7)25(17)35-9)11-13-28(3)29(4,38-27(30)37-28)14-12-20-18(2)26(36-10)24(34-8)16-22(20)32-6/h15-16H,1-10H3/t28-,29+ Key: NJECTZSLZHQUFD-ISILISOKSA-N; InChI=1/C29H32O9/c1-17-19(21(31-5)15-23(33-7)25(17)35-9)11-13-28(3)29(4,38-27(30)37-28)14-12-20-18(2)26(36-10)24(34-8)16-22(20)32-6/h15-16H,1-10H3/t28-,29+ Key: NJECTZSLZHQUFD-ISILISOKBI
- SMILES: CC1=C(C(=CC(=C1OC)OC)OC)C#C[C@@]2([C@](OC(=O)O2)(C)C#CC3=C(C(=C(C=C3OC)OC)OC)C)C

Properties
Chemical formula	C_{29}H_{32}O_{9}
Molar mass	524.566 g·mol^{−1}
- Except where otherwise noted, data are given for materials in their standard state (at 25 °C [77 °F], 100 kPa). Infobox references

Antrodioxolanone is an anti-inflammatory alkyne isolated from Antrodia camphorata.
