= Antrocamphin B =

Names
- Preferred IUPAC name 4-(3,4,6-Trimethoxy-2-methylphenyl)but-3-yn-2-one

Identifiers
CAS Number	945622-08-2
3D model (JSmol)	Interactive image
ChEMBL	ChEMBL229342
ChemSpider	20568908
PubChem CID	16737473
UNII	9W9P6W6C4R
CompTox Dashboard (EPA)	DTXSID201031416
- InChI: InChI=1S/C14H16O4/c1-9(15)6-7-11-10(2)14(18-5)13(17-4)8-12(11)16-3/h8H,1-5H3 Key: IKGSJDIGQRJKDN-UHFFFAOYSA-N
- SMILES: CC1=C(C(=CC(=C1OC)OC)OC)C#CC(=O)C

Properties
Chemical formula	C_{14}H_{16}O_{4}
Molar mass	248.278 g·mol^{−1}
- Except where otherwise noted, data are given for materials in their standard state (at 25 °C [77 °F], 100 kPa). Infobox references

Antrocamphin B is an unusual chemical compound isolated from Taiwanofungus camphoratus. Antrocamphin B is a congener of antrocamphin A.
