= Globuliciopsis =

Scientific classification
- Kingdom: Fungi
- Division: Basidiomycota
- Class: Agaricomycetes
- Order: Polyporales
- Family: incertae sedis
- Genus: Globuliciopsis; Hjortstam & Ryvarden (2004)

Type species
- Globuliciopsis fuegiana Hjortstam & Ryvarden (2004)

Species
- Globuliciopsis fuegiana Globuliciopsis lindbladii

Genus of fungi

Globuliciopsis is a genus of corticioid fungi in the order Polyporales. It currently contains two species found in Central and South America.

== Taxonomy ==
The genus was circumscribed by mycologists Kurt Hjortstam and Leif Ryvarden in 2004 to contain the type species, Globuliciopsis fuegiana. This fungus was originally collected in Tierra del Fuego National Park, Argentina. The Costa Rican species G. lindbladii was added to the genus by these authors in 2007. Globuliciopsis is of uncertain familial placement in the Polyporales.

== Description ==
The fruit bodies of Globuliciopsis are pale brown, thick crusts that adhere closely to their substrates. The spore-bearing surface is smooth, while the subiculum is compact and brownish. Globuliciopsis has a monomitic hyphal system (containing only generative hyphae), and the hyphae are hyaline (translucent) and lack clamp connections. Cystidia are absent from the hymenium, but there are hyphal ends and dendrohyphidia. The basidia (spore-bearing cells) are arranged in a relatively loose palisade, measuring up to 100 μm long. They usually have two, but sometimes three to four sterigmata. Spores are roughly spherical, smooth, hyaline, and feature a slight wall thickening. They are somewhat cyanophilous, but do not react with Melzer's reagent.
