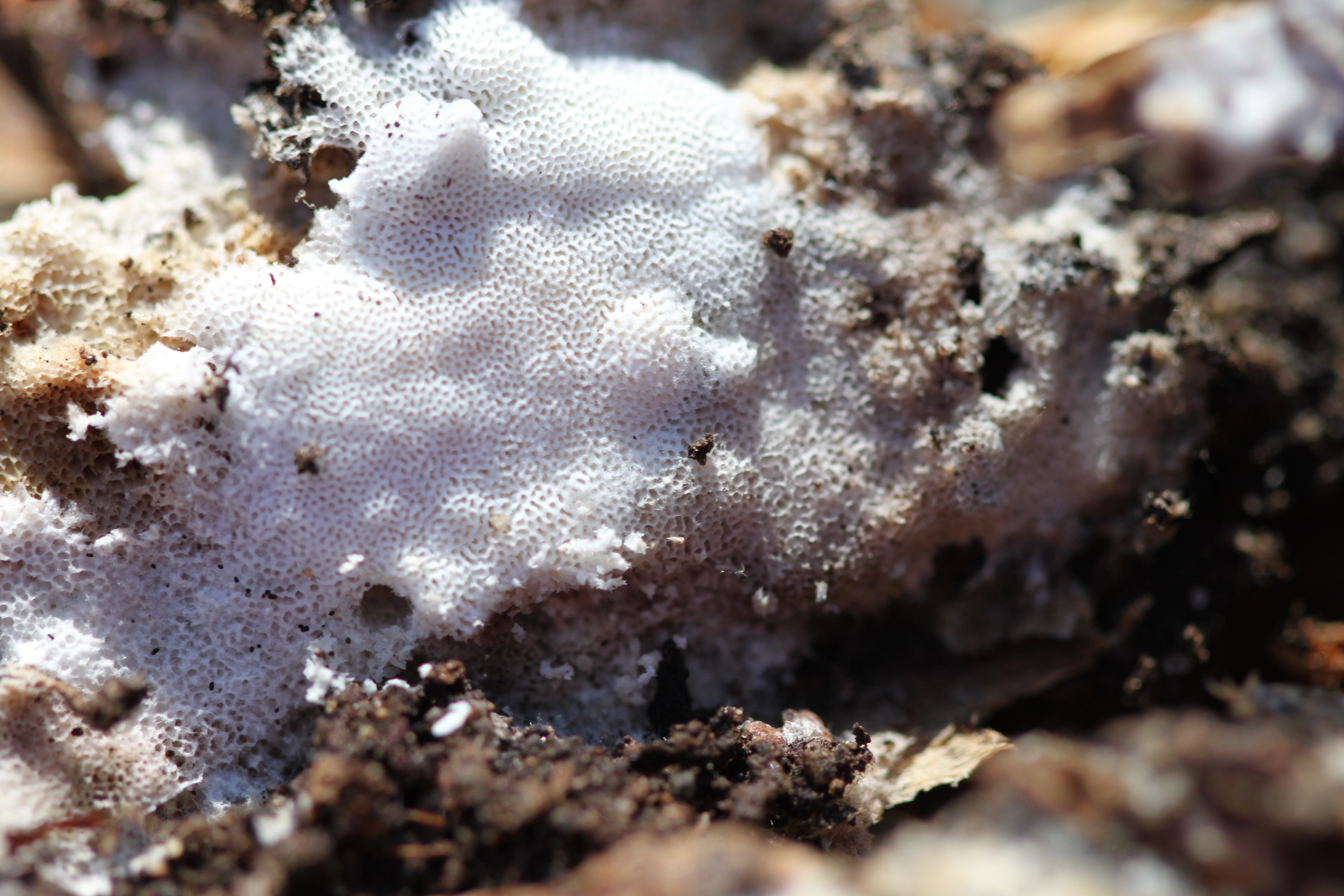
- Cinereomyces lindbladii

Scientific classification
- Kingdom: Fungi
- Division: Basidiomycota
- Class: Agaricomycetes
- Order: Polyporales
- Family: Gelatoporiaceae
- Genus: Cinereomyces; Jülich (1982)

Type species
- Cinereomyces lindbladii (Berk.) Jülich (1982)

Species
- C. dilutabilis C. lindbladii

= Cinereomyces =

Genus of fungi

Cinereomyces is a genus of resupinate (crust-like) fungi in the family Gelatoporiaceae. The genus was circumscribed by Swiss mycologist Walter Jülich in 1981. Species in the genus have a gray pore surface except for a whitish margin, and skeletal hyphae with gelatinized walls. As of June 2017, Index Fungorum accepts two species of Cinereomyces: the type, C. lindbladii, and C. dilutabilis. The latter species was transferred to Cinereomyces from Diplomitoporus in 2016.

== Distribution ==
Cinereomyces lindbladii is widely distributed, while C. dilutabilis has been recorded from Brazil and Costa Rica.
