= Glucose-methanol-choline oxidoreductase family =

GMC oxidoreductase
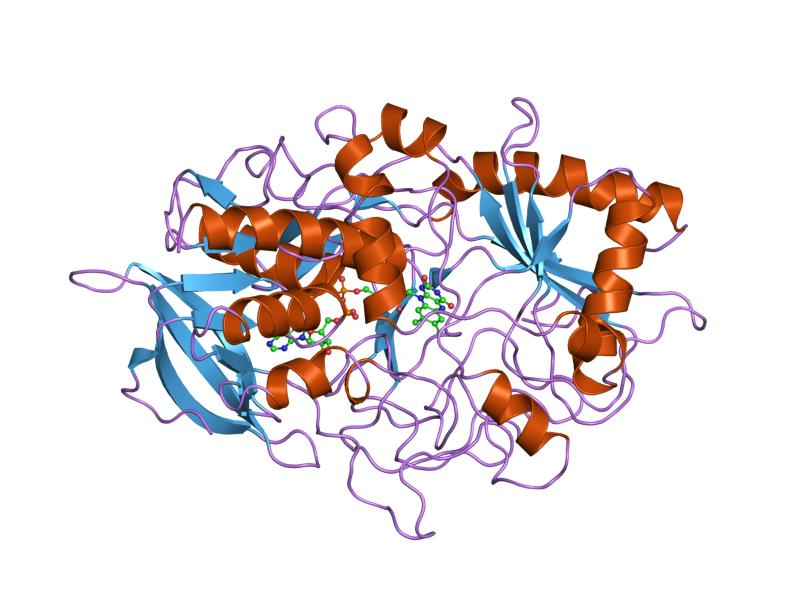
- Crystal structure of cholesterol oxidase complexed with a steroid substrate. Implications for FAD dependent alcohol oxidases.

Identifiers
- Symbol: GMC_oxred_N
- Pfam: PF00732
- Pfam clan: CL0063
- InterPro: IPR000172
- PROSITE: PDOC00543
- SCOP2: 1gal / SCOPe / SUPFAM
- OPM superfamily: 132
- OPM protein: 1b4v
Available protein structures:
- Pfam: structures / ECOD
- PDB: RCSB PDB; PDBe; PDBj
- PDBsum: structure summary

GMC oxidoreductase
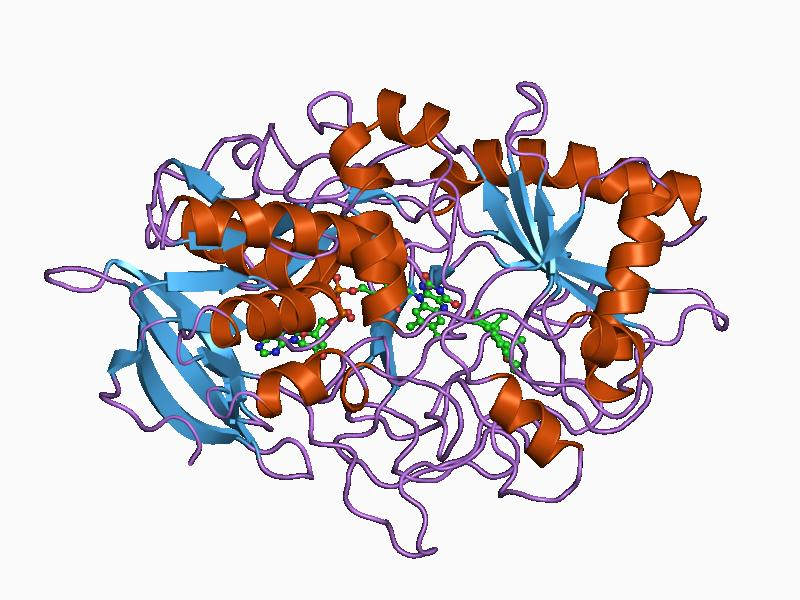
- Crystal structure of cholesterol oxidase complexed with a steroid substrate. Implications for fad dependent alcohol oxidases.

Identifiers
- Symbol: GMC_oxred_C
- Pfam: PF05199
- InterPro: IPR007867
- PROSITE: PDOC00543
- SCOP2: 1gal / SCOPe / SUPFAM
Available protein structures:
- Pfam: structures / ECOD
- PDB: RCSB PDB; PDBe; PDBj
- PDBsum: structure summary

In molecular biology, the glucose-methanol-choline oxidoreductase family (GMC oxidoreductase) is a family of enzymes with oxidoreductase activity.

The glucose-methanol-choline (GMC) oxidoreductases are FAD flavoproteins oxidoreductases. These enzymes include a variety of proteins; choline dehydrogenase (CHD) EC 1.1.99.1, methanol oxidase (MOX) EC 1.1.3.13 and cellobiose dehydrogenase EC 1.1.99.18 which share a number of regions of sequence similarities. They contain two conserved protein domains. The N-terminal domain corresponds to the FAD ADP-binding domain, the C-terminal domain is a steroid-binding domain.
