= Gelatoporia =

Scientific classification
- Kingdom: Fungi
- Division: Basidiomycota
- Class: Agaricomycetes
- Order: Polyporales
- Family: Gelatoporiaceae
- Genus: Gelatoporia; Niemelä (1985)

Type species
- Gelatoporia subvermispora (Pilát) Niemelä (1985)

Genus of fungi

Gelatoporia is a fungal genus in the family Gelatoporiaceae. This is a monotypic genus, containing the single widely distributed species Gelatoporia subvermispora. The genus was circumscribed in 1985 by Finnish mycologist Tuomo Niemelä to contain poroid crust fungi with a monomitic hyphal structure, clamped hyphae, and producing white rot.
