= Aphyllophorales =

Order of fungi

The Aphyllophorales is an obsolete order of fungi in the Basidiomycota. The order is entirely artificial, bringing together a miscellany of species now grouped among the clavarioid fungi, corticioid fungi, cyphelloid fungi, hydnoid fungi, and poroid fungi.

== History ==
The order Aphyllophorales was first proposed in 1922 by Carleton Rea. A-phyllo-phora means 'not bearing gills', distinguishing the Aphyllophorales from the gilled agarics (mushrooms and toadstools) that Rea placed in the Agaricales. The Gasteromycetales and Heterobasidiomycetes were also excluded.

As originally conceived, the Aphyllophorales contained the families Clavariaceae, Cyphellaceae, Fistulinaceae, Hydnaceae, Meruliaceae, Polyporaceae, Polystictaceae, and Thelephoraceae. Most of these families are still current, albeit in an amended form.

Though many attempts were made to create a more natural classification of the Basidiomycota, the Aphyllophorales continued to be used (at least by some) until entirely superseded in the 1990s by classification systems based on cladistic analysis of DNA sequences.
