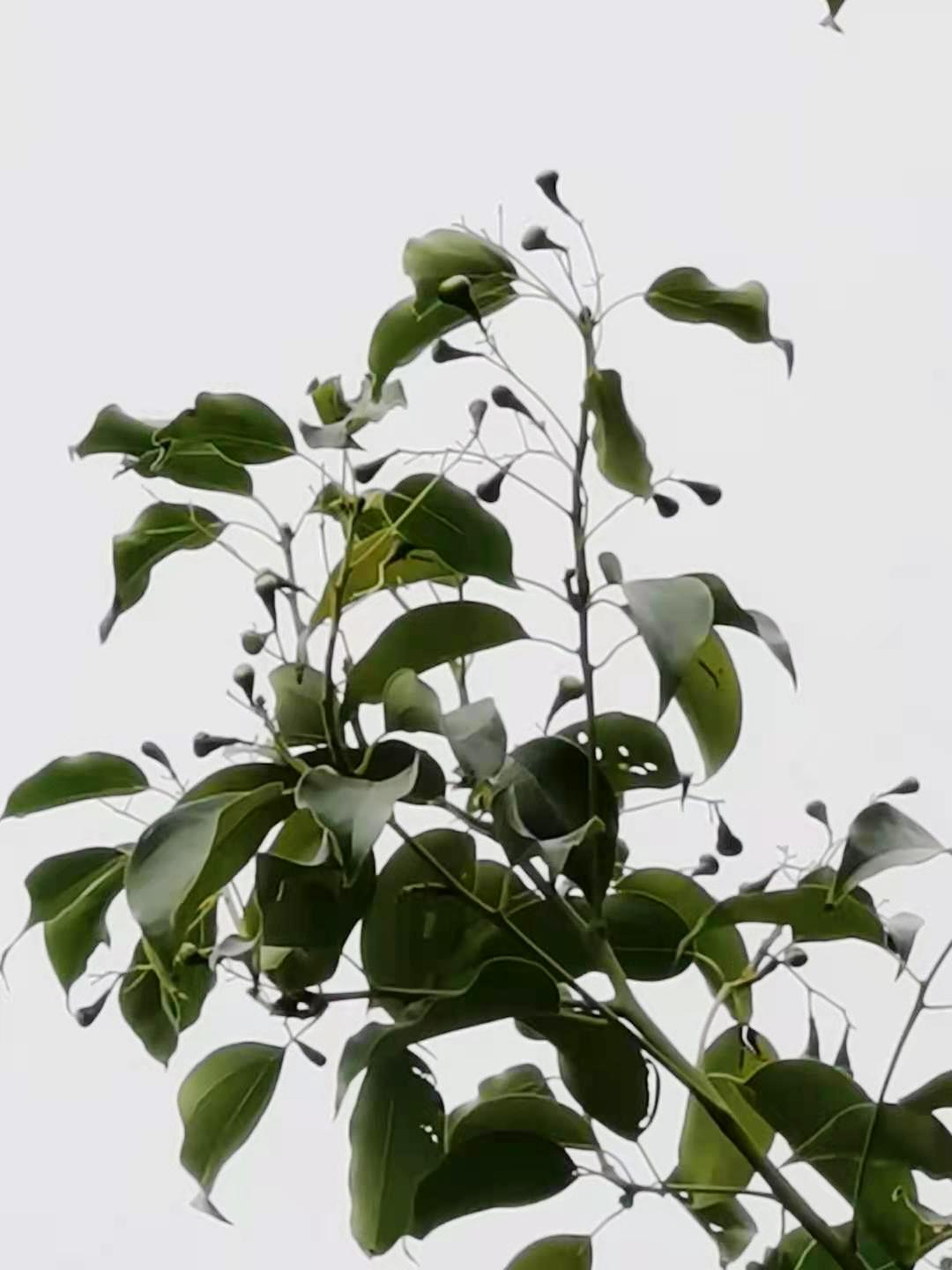

Scientific classification
- Kingdom: Plantae
- Clade: Tracheophytes
- Clade: Angiosperms
- Clade: Magnoliids
- Order: Laurales
- Family: Lauraceae
- Genus: Cinnamomum
- Species: C. kanehirae

Binomial name
- Cinnamomum kanehirae (Hayata) Hayata

= Cinnamomum kanehirae =

Species of flowering plant

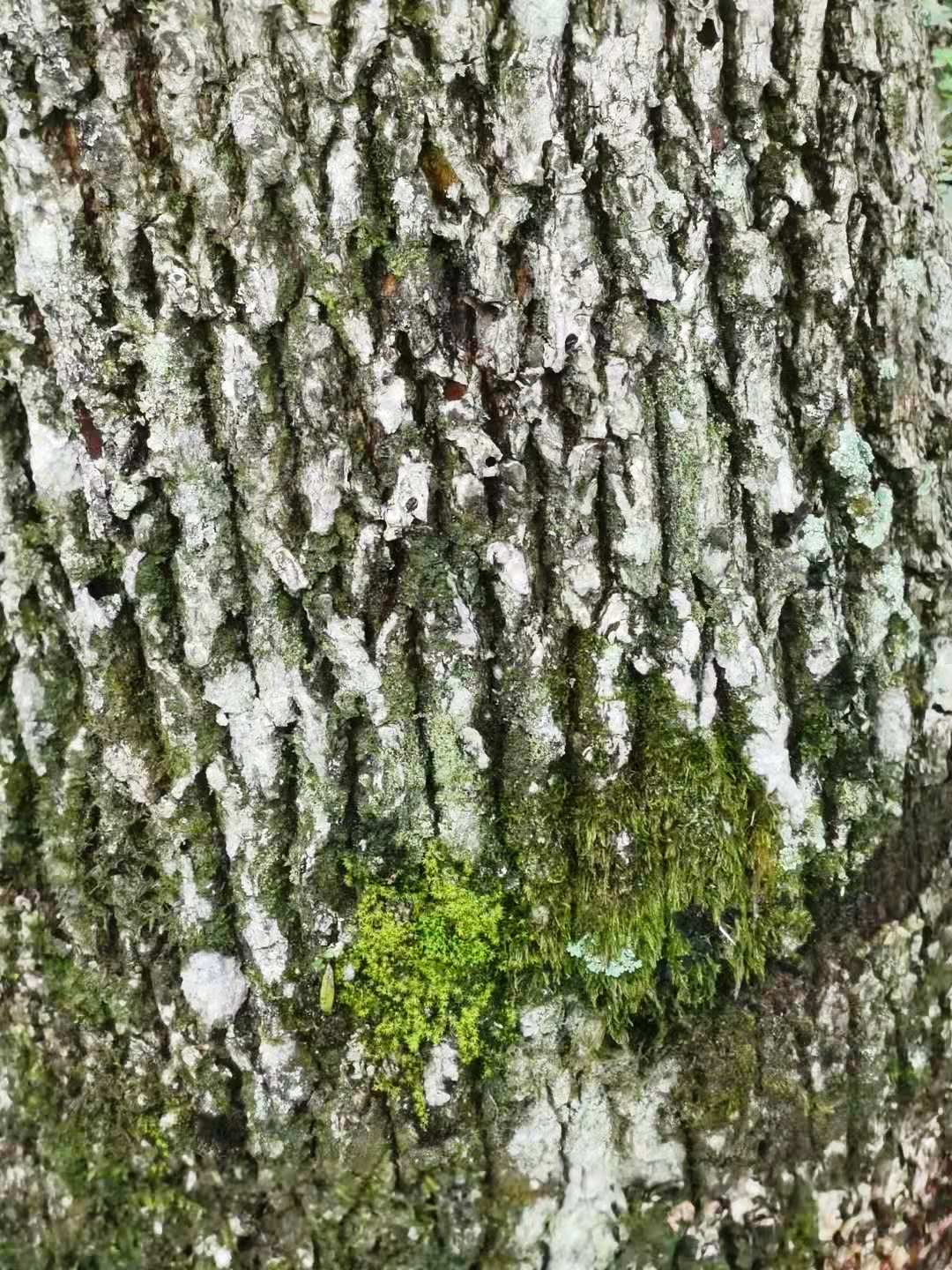
The longitudinal splits in the trunk is one of the tree's characteristics.

Cinnamomum kanehirae (Chinese name niu zhang(牛樟)), also known as small-flowered camphor tree, or stout camphor tree, is a tree within the genus Cinnamomum of the family Lauraceae endemic to Taiwan.

== Characteristics ==
The tree can grow up to 30 m tall, 2 m across; evergreen trees; bark brown, fissured; branchlets glabrous, and yellow-green in color; leaves alternate, coriaceous, entire, margins often wavy, broadly ovate, ovate to elliptic, polished, 10–15 cm long, 4–7.5 cm wide, green and glabrous on both sides, usually with 0–3 or often 5 main veins, rarely with pinnate veins, lateral veins 2–3 pairs, short acute at apex, obtuse-rounded at base; petioles 1.4–3 cm long, grooved above. Inflorescences cymes, terminal; bracts of flowers pubescent outside, 2–3 mm across; perianth 6, pale-yellow, oblong, 2 mm long, tomentose at base inside, 1st and 2nd whorls of stamens 0.5 mm long, tomentose at base inside, anthers 4-celled, eglandular, introrse, 3rd whorl of stamens with glands, tomentose at base inside, anthers 4-celled, extrorse. Berry compressed-obconic or globose, l.2-1.3 cm long, l.2-1.5 cm across, green to blackish-violet, slightly pubescent to glabrous; seeds globose, 1 cm across, rounded on both sides. Flowering Nov. to December.; Fruiting Sept. to October.

== Habitat ==
This species is present at 200–2,000 m, mixed with C. micranthum in broad-leaved forests throughout Taiwan.

== Uses ==
It is commonly used in carving and manufacturing equipment, and sometimes used in furniture; branches and leaves can also be distilled to obtain the wood's essential oils.

== Gallery ==
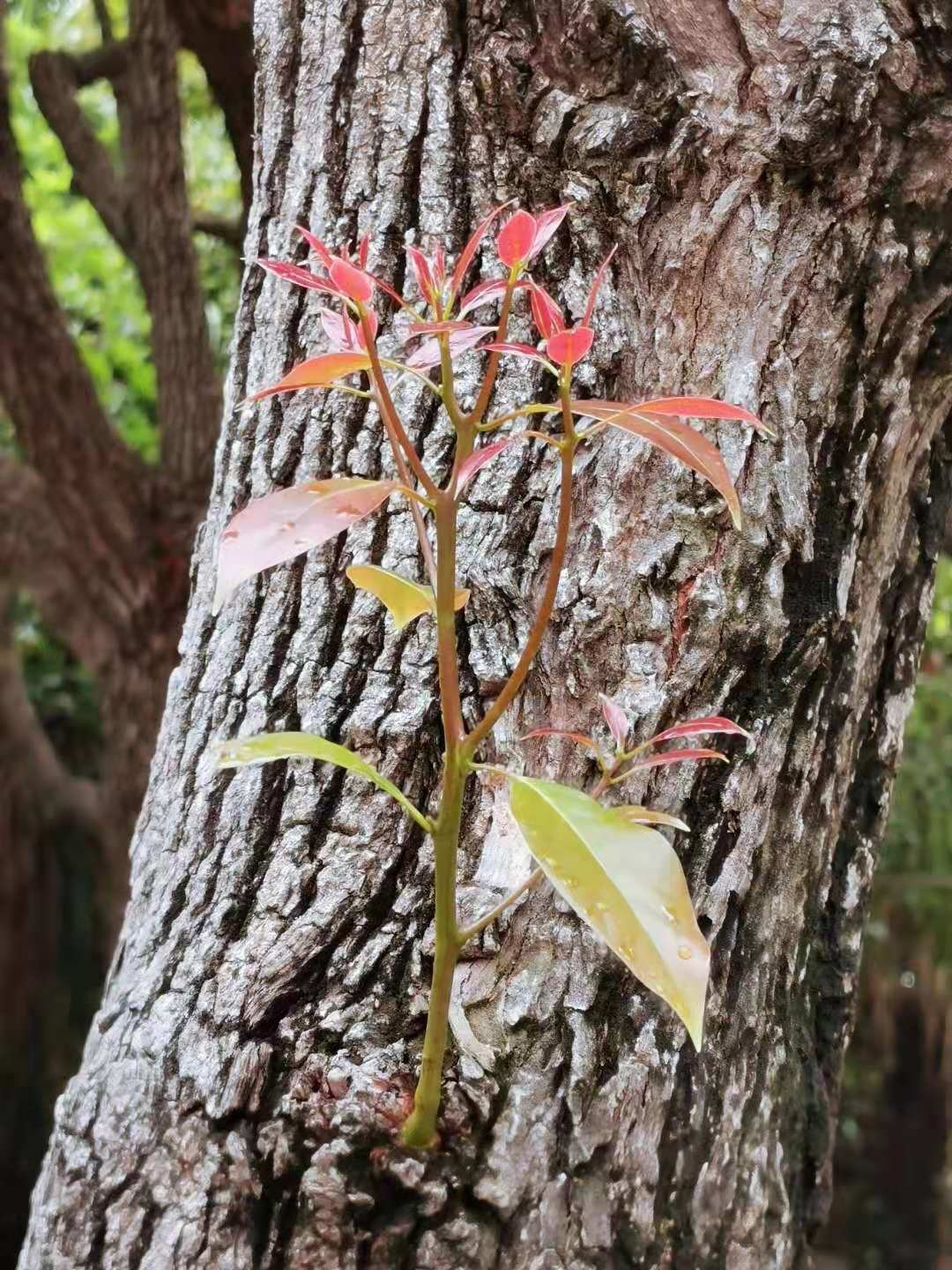
New branch

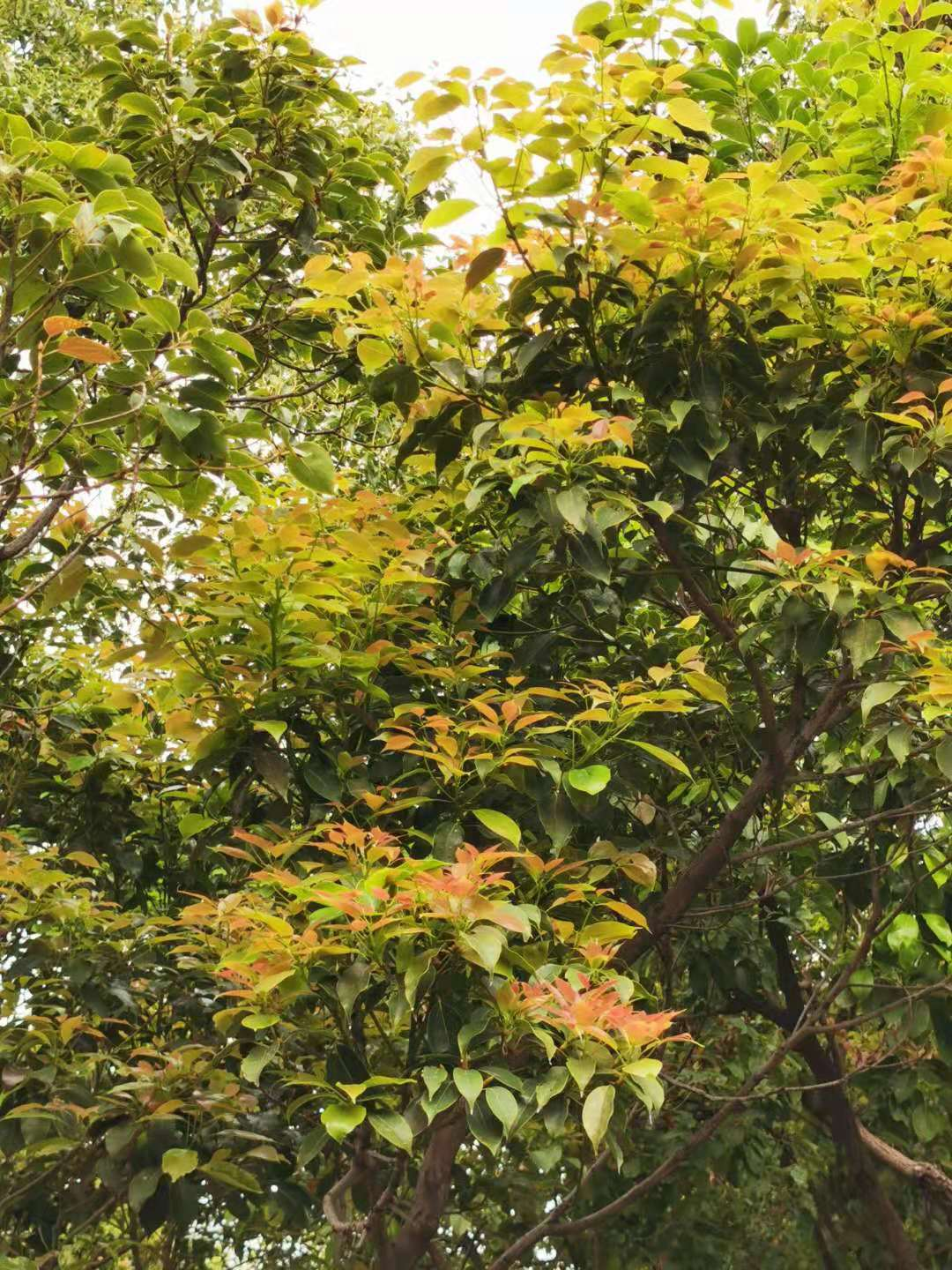
New leaves

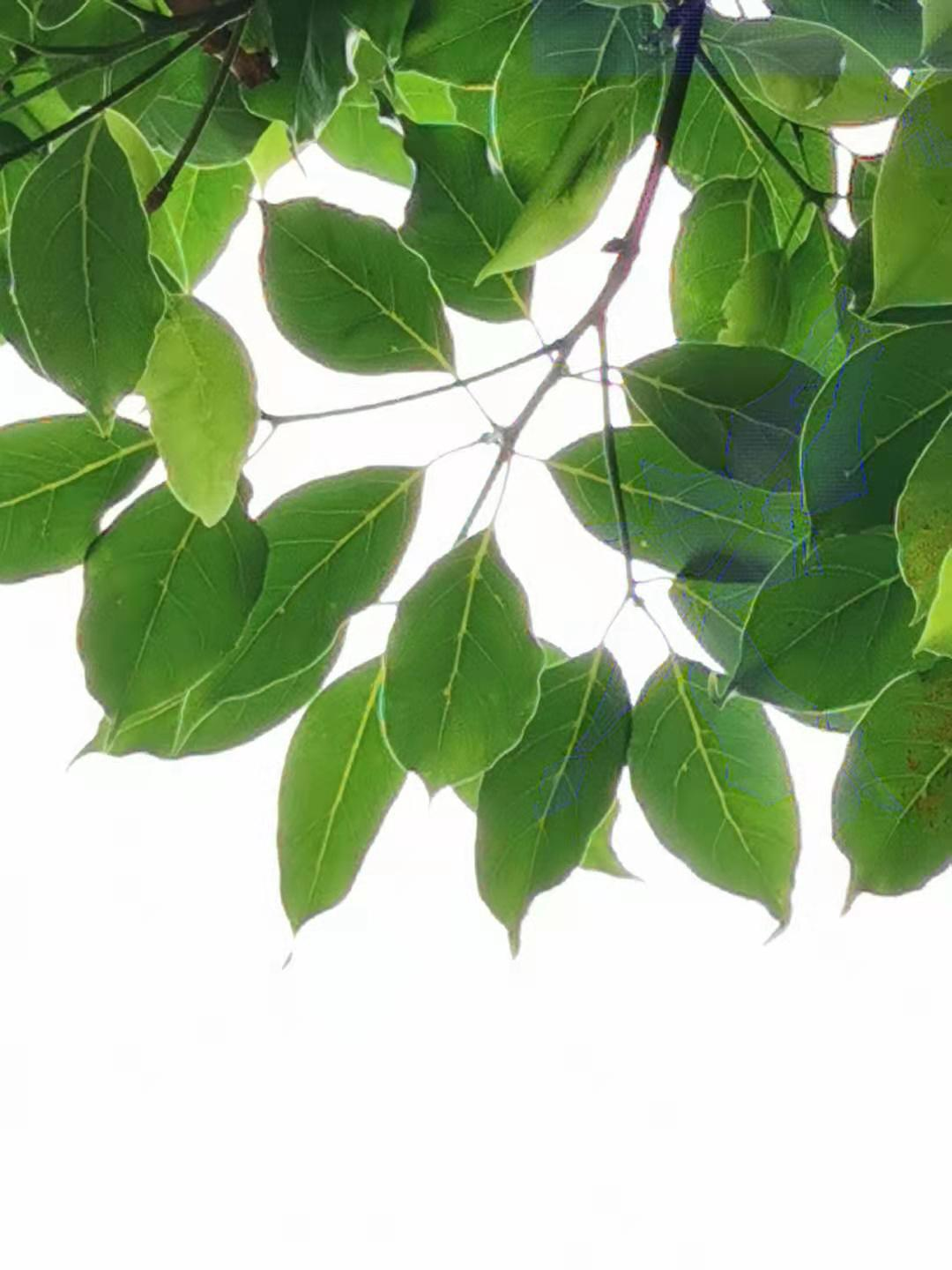
Leaves

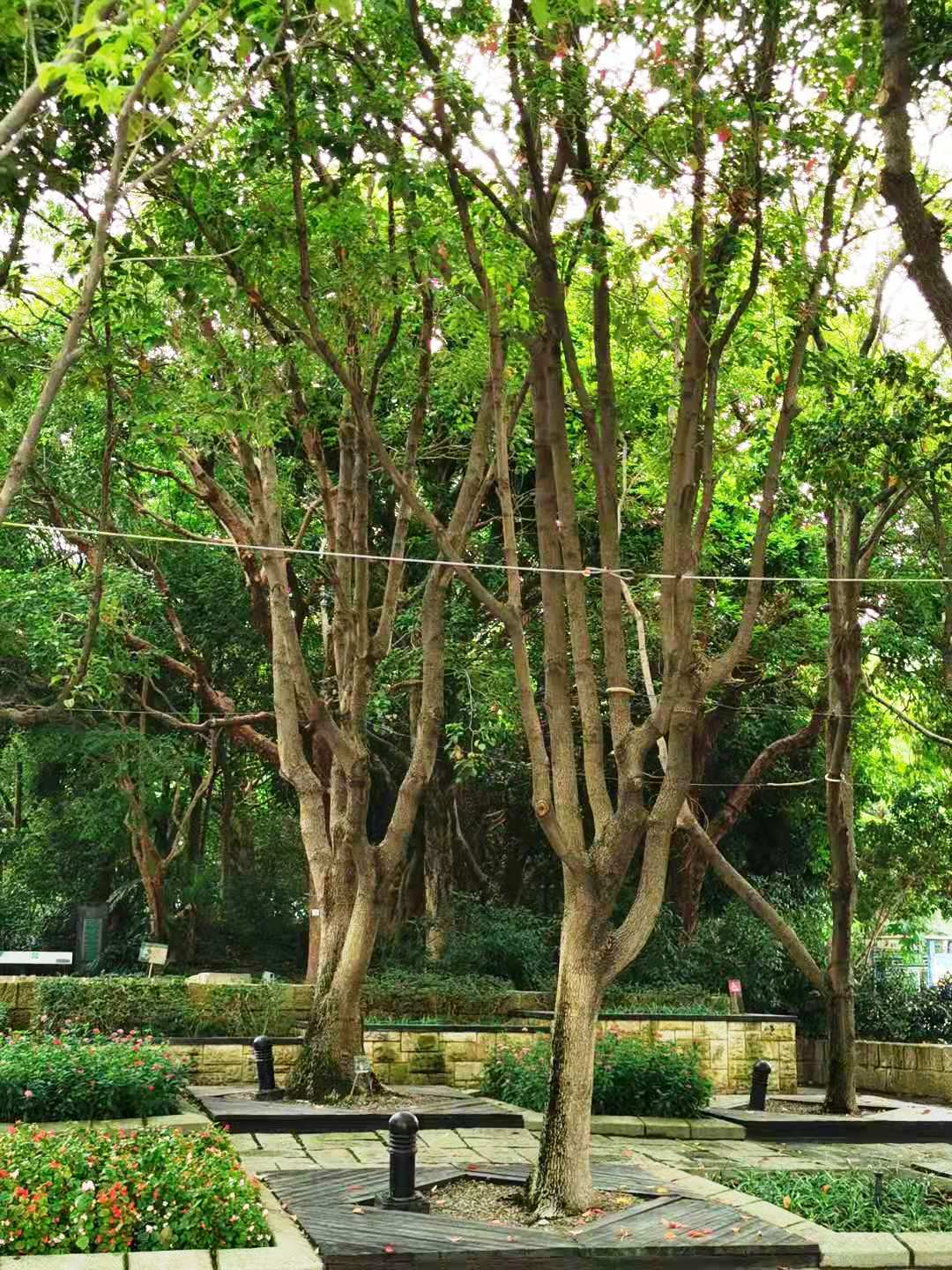
One of the tree's characteristics is that the tree is tall and straight.
