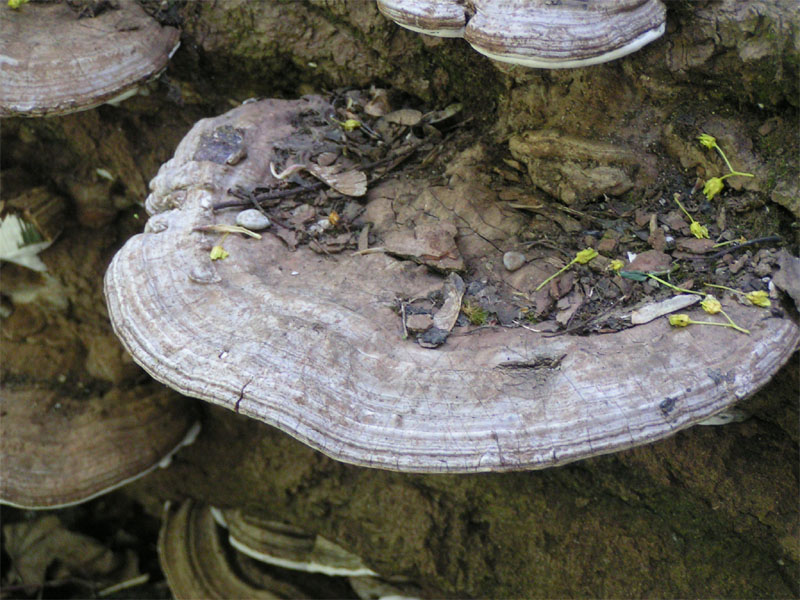
- Ganoderma applanatum

Scientific classification
- Kingdom: Fungi
- Division: Basidiomycota
- Class: Agaricomycetes
- Subclass: incertae sedis
- Order: Polyporales; Gäum. (1926)

Families
- Cerrenaceae; Dacryobolaceae; Fibroporiaceae; Fomitopsidaceae; Fragiliporiaceae; Ganodermataceae; Gelatoporiaceae; Grifolaceae; Hyphodermataceae; Incrustoporiaceae; Irpicaceae; Ischnodermataceae; Laetiporaceae; Lentoporiaceae; Meripilaceae; Meruliaceae; Phanerochaetaceae; Podoscyphaceae; Polyporaceae; Postiaceae; Pycnoporellaceae; Rhodoniaceae; Sarcoporiaceae; Sparassidaceae; Steccherinaceae

Synonyms
- Aphyllophorales Rea; Coriolales Jülich (1981); Fomitopsidales Jülich (1981); Ganodermatales Jülich (1981); Grifolales Jülich (1981); Perenniporiales Jülich (1981); Phaeolales Jülich (1981); Poriales Locquin (1981); Trametales Boidin, Mugnier & Canales (1998)

= Polyporales =

Order of fungi

The Polyporales are an order of about 1,800 species of fungi in the division Basidiomycota. The order includes some (but not all) polypores as well as many corticioid fungi and a few agarics (mainly in the genus Lentinus). Many species within the order are saprotrophic, most of them wood-rotters. Some genera, such as Ganoderma and Fomes, contain species that attack living tissues and then continue to degrade the wood of their dead hosts. Those of economic importance include several important pathogens of trees and a few species that cause damage by rotting structural timber. Some of the Polyporales are commercially cultivated and marketed for use as food items or in traditional Chinese medicine.

== Taxonomy ==
=== History ===
The order was originally proposed in 1926 by Swiss mycologist Ernst Albert Gäumann to accommodate species within the phylum Basidiomycota producing basidiocarps (fruit bodies) showing a gymnocapous mode of development (forming the spore-bearing surface externally). As such, the order included the ten families Brachybasidiaceae, Corticiaceae, Clavariaceae, Cyphellaceae, Dictyolaceae, Fistulinaceae, Polyporaceae, Radulaceae, Tulasnellaceae, and Vuilleminiaceae, representing a mix of poroid, corticioid, cyphelloid, and clavarioid fungi.

In a series of publications in 1932, E. J. H. Corner explained the occurrence of different types of hyphae in the fruit bodies of polypore fungi. He introduced the concept of hyphal analysis, which later become a fundamental character in polypore taxonomy.

The order Polyporales was not widely adopted by Gäumann's contemporaries; most mycologists and reference works preferring to use the catch-all, artificial order Aphyllophorales for polypores and other "non-gilled fungi". When an attempt was made to introduce a more natural, morphology-based classification of the fungi in the 1980s and 1990s, the order was still overlooked. A standard 1995 reference work placed most polypores and corticioid fungi in the Ganodermatales, Poriales, and Stereales.

=== Current status ===
- - /residual
    - - /phlebioid
        - - **Phanerochaetaceae**
          - **Irpicaceae**
        - **Meruliaceae**
      - Candelabrochaete africana
    - - - **Steccherinaceae**
        - - **Cerrenaceae***
          - **Panaceae***
      - - - - **Hyphodermataceae**
            - **Meripilaceae**
          - **Podoscyphaceae**
        - /hypochnicium & /climacocystis
  - - - - - /core polyporoid
            **Polyporaceae**
          - **Grifolaceae**
        - - - /gelatoporia
              **Gelatoporiaceae***
            - Mycoleptodonoides vassiljevae
          - Auriporia aurea
      - - /antrodia
          - - - **Fomitopsidaceae**
              - **Laetiporaceae**
            - /fibroporia + amyloporia
          - - **Dacryobolaceae**
            - **Sparassidaceae**
        - /skeletocutis-tyromyces
          **Incrustoporiaceae**
    - **Ischnodermataceae**

Simplified phylogenetic overview of the families (bolded) and clades (preceded with "/") recognized in Justo et al. 2017. Families marked with (*) were newly created.

Molecular research, based on cladistic analysis of DNA sequences, has resurrected and redefined the Polyporales (also known as the polyporoid clade). Studies using a combination of rRNA gene sequences, single-copy protein-coding genes, and genome-based phylogenetic analyses have shown that the Polyporales are a monophyletic group. They are a member of the class Agaricomycetes, but have not been assigned to a subclass. Though the precise boundaries of the order and its constituent families are yet to be resolved, it retains the core group of polypores in the family Polyporaceae, with additional species in the Fomitopsidaceae and Meripilaceae. It also includes polypores in the Ganodermataceae, which were previously assigned to their own separate order, the Ganodermatales, based on their distinctive basidiospore morphology. Corticioid fungi belonging to the Cystostereaceae, Meruliaceae, Phanerochaetaceae, and Xenasmataceae are also included, as are the cauliflower fungi in the Sparassidaceae.

In an extensive molecular analysis, Manfred Binder and colleagues analyzed 6 genes from 373 species and confirmed the existence of four previously recognized lineages of Polyporales: the antrodia, core polyporoid, phlebioid, and residual polyporoid clades. Extending this work, Alfredo Justo and colleagues proposed a phylogenetic overview of the Polyporales that included a new family-level classification. They assigned family names to 18 clades and four informal unranked clades. The families are listed below, followed by their taxonomic authorities and year of publication:

- Phanerochaetaceae Jülich (1981)
- Irpicaceae Spirin & Zmitr. (2003)
- Meruliaceae Rea (1922)
- Steccherinaceae Parmasto (1968)
- Cerrenaceae Miettinen, Justo & Hibbett (2017)
- Panaceae Miettinen, Justo & Hibbett (2017)
- Hyphodermataceae Jülich (1981)
- Meripilaceae Jülich (1981)
- Podoscyphaceae D.A.Reid (1965)
- Polyporaceae Corda (1939)
- Fomitopsidaceae Jülich (1981)
- Laetiporaceae Jülich (1981)
- Dacryobolaceae Jülich (1981)
- Sparassidaceae Jülich (1981)
- Grifolaceae Jülich (1981)
- Gelatoporiaceae Miettinen, Justo & Hibbett (2017)
- Incrustoporiaceae Jülich (1981)
- Ischnodermataceae Jülich (1981)

Other families that putatively belong to the Polyporales, but for which molecular confirmation is absent or lacking, include Diachanthodaceae Jülich, (1981); Fragiliporiaceae Y.C.Dai, B.K.Cui & C.L.Zhao (2015); Hymenogrammaceae Jülich (1981); and Phaeotrametaceae Popoff ex Piątek (2005). The Nigrofomitaceae, formerly placed in the Polyporales, was shown to be nested as a distinct lineage within the Hymenochaetales.

The family Steccherinaceae was redefined in 2012 to contain most species of the poroid and hydnoid genera Antrodiella, Junghuhnia, and Steccherinum, as well as members of 12 other hydnoid and poroid genera that had been traditionally classified in the families Phanerochaetaceae, Polyporaceae, and Meruliaceae. Several new genera were added to the Steccherinaceae in 2016–17.

== Ecology ==
The order is cosmopolitan and contains around 1800 species of fungi worldwide—about 1.5% of all known fungus species. All species in the Polyporales are saprotrophs, most of them wood-rotters. Their fruit bodies are therefore typically found on living or moribund trees or on dead attached or fallen wood. Polyporales species that fruit on the ground are either root rot species–such as Laetiporus cincinnatus and Grifola frondosa, or are fruiting from buried pieces of substrate–such as Polyporus radicatus and P. melanopus.

Wood-decay Polyporales reduce the volume of dead wood in the forest and are an important component of the carbon cycle. Wood is composed of primarily three types of tissue: lignin, cellulose, and hemicelluloses. White rot species of Polyporales are efficient degraders of the decay-resistant polymer lignin, leaving partially degraded cellulose as a residue. Brown rot species break down the cellulose fibres, leaving a brittle, brown lignin residue. Brown-rot residues such as humus can remain in the soil for hundreds of years, increasing aeration and water-holding capacity.

Peroxidase enzymes that degrade lignin, such as lignin peroxidase, manganese peroxidase, or versatile peroxidase, are present in all white-rot members of the Polyporales, but absent in brown-rot species. Oxidase enzymes, including members of the glucose-methanol-choline oxidoreductase family, play a key role in the breakdown of plant polymers because they generate hydrogen peroxide, which acts as the ultimate oxidizer in both white-rot and brown-rot decay.

Two species of Polyporales, Daedalea quercina and Fomitopsis pinicola, use paralysing toxins to destroy and colonize nematodes that feed on their fruit bodies.

== Importance ==
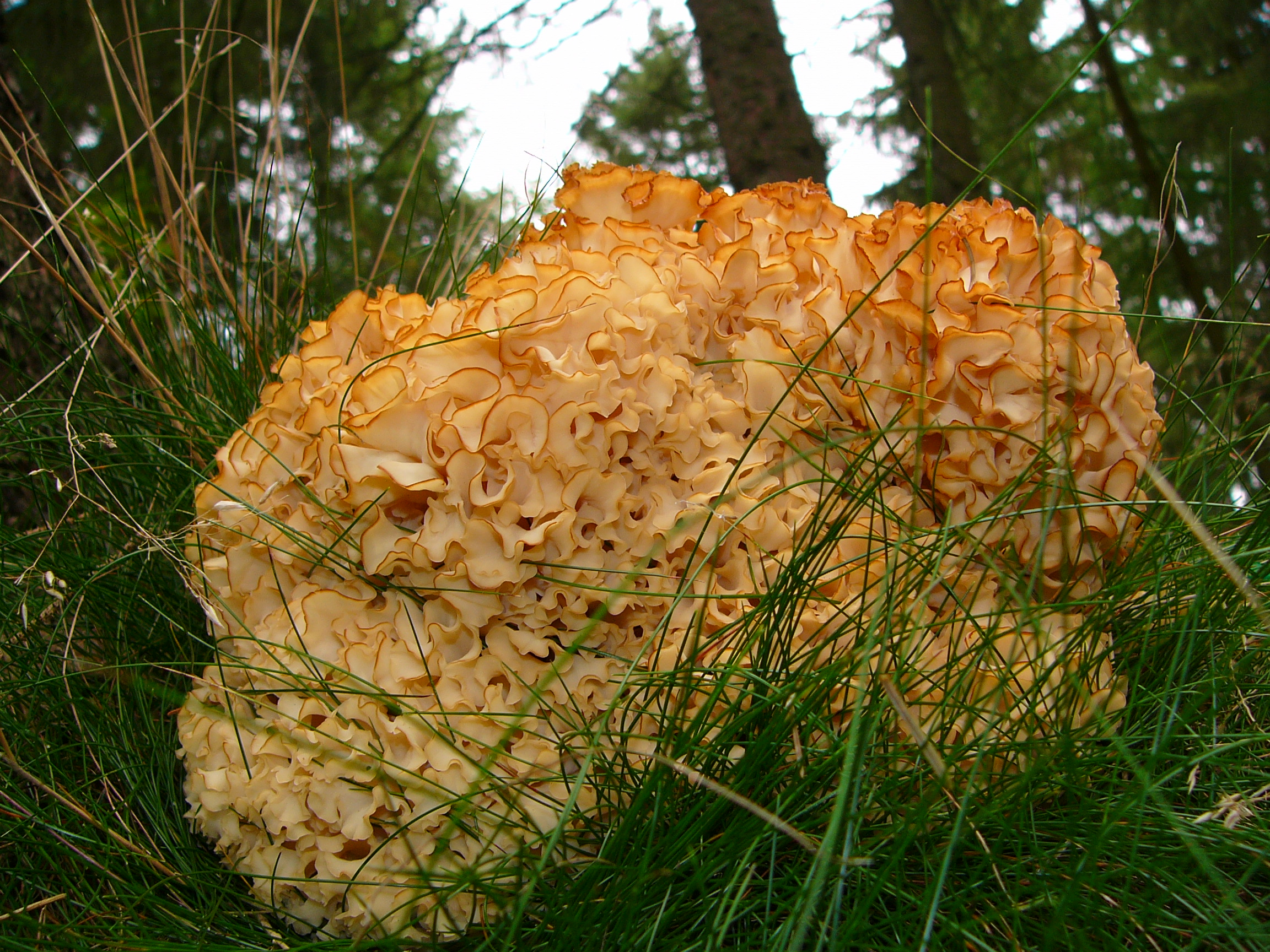
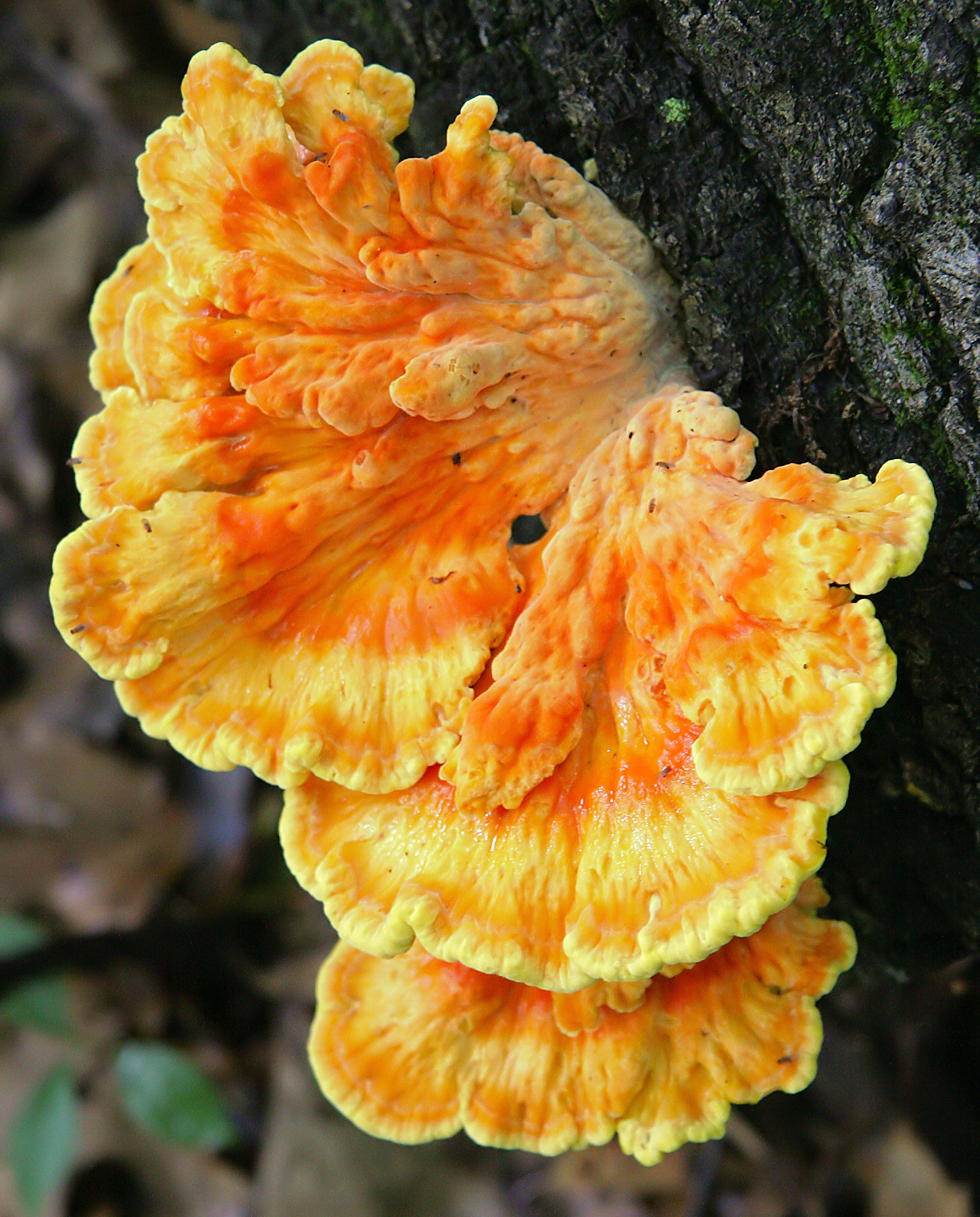
Sparassis crispa (left) and Laetiporus sulphureus are two edible Polyporales species

Many wood-decay fungi in the genera Fomes, Fomitopsis and Ganoderma are pathogenic, causing butt and root rot of living trees and consequent losses in forestry plantations. Several species, such as the mine fungus Fibroporia vaillantii, can rot and damage structural timber.

Several of the Polyporales, notably Ganoderma lucidum (ling-zhi), Grifola frondosa (maitake), Taiwanofungus camphoratus (niú zhāng zhī), Lignosus rhinocerotis, and Trametes versicolor (yun-zhi), are commercially cultivated and marketed for use in traditional Chinese medicine. The polypores Laetiporus sulphureus, Fomes fomentarius, Fomitopsis pinicola, Fomitopsis betulina, and Laricifomes officinalis have been widely used in central European folk medicine for the treatment of various diseases.

Some species, including several members of the genera Laetiporus and Sparassis, are used as food. Blackfellow's bread, or Laccocephalum mylittae, is an edible that is prized by Aboriginal Australians. Lentinus squarrosulus is collected and eaten in Asian and African communities.

Fomitopsis betulina was formerly used in the manufacture of charcoal crayons. Amadou, a spongy material derived from the fruit bodies of Fomes fomentarius, has been used since ancient times as a tinder. More recently, it has been used by dentists as a styptic, or as a felt-like material for making hats and other items. The anise-scented fruit bodies of Haploporus odorus were used by some tribes of Plains Indians as a component of sacred objects. Laricifomes officinalis was used by nineteenth century Pacific northwest shamans for carving spirit figures. Some species, including dyer's polypore (Phaeolus schweinitzii) and purple dye polypore (Hapalopilus nidulans) are used in mushroom dyeing.

== Sequenced genomes ==
Several member of the Polyporales have had their genomes sequenced to help understand the genetic basis for the production of enzymes involved in the synthesis of putative medicinal compounds, or to elucidate the metabolic pathways of wood decay, including Ganoderma lucidum, Lignosus rhinocerotis, Dichomitus squalens, Fomitopsis pinicola, Trametes versicolor, and Wolfiporia cocos. Two sequenced fungi, Phanerochaete chrysosporium, and Postia placenta, serve as model species for researchers investigating the mechanism of white rot and brown rot, respectively. As of 2017, there have been 46 Polyporales genomes sequenced, representing about 7% of all sequenced fungal genomes.

== Fossil record ==
Fossilized fruit bodies of a Fomes species dating back to the Tertiary (66–2.6 Ma) were reported in Idaho in 1940. A fossil fruit body of Ganodermites libycus was reported from the Early Miocene (23–2.6 Ma) in the Libyan Desert. This specimen is the earliest convincing fossil evidence for the Polyporales.

Molecular clock techniques have been used to estimate the age of the Polyporales, suggesting that the order evolved either during the late Jurassic, about 203–250 Ma, or, in more recent study, about 114 Ma.

== Genera Incertae sedis ==
There are several genera classified in the Polyporales that for various reason have not been assigned to a specific family. They are incertae sedis with respect to familial placement. Some may be poorly known and/or not included in DNA phylogenetic studies, or when they have been, did not clearly group with any named family (In some cases a new family must be created rather than the placement clarified.). These include:

- Aegis Gómez-Montoya, Rajchenb. & Robledo (2017)
- Anthoporia Karasiński & Niemelä (2016)
- Bourdotiella Duhem & Schultheis (2011)
- Crustodontia Hjortstam & Ryvarden (2005)
- Crystallocystidium (Rick) Rick (1940)
- Donkioporiella L.W.Zhou (2016)
- Globosomyces Jülich (1980)
- Globuliciopsis Hjortstam & Ryvarden (2004)
- Irpicochaete Rick (1940)
- Meruliophana Duhem & Buyck (2011)
- Nigrohydnum Ryvarden (1987)
- Phaeophlebiopsis D.Floudas & Hibbett (2015)
- Phlebiella P.Karst. (1890)
- Repetobasidiopsis Dhingra & Avn.P.Singh (2008)
- Rickiopora Westphalen, Tomšovský & Rajchenb. (2016)
- Taiwanofungus Sheng H.Wu, Z.H.Yu, Y.C.Dai & C.H.Su (2004)
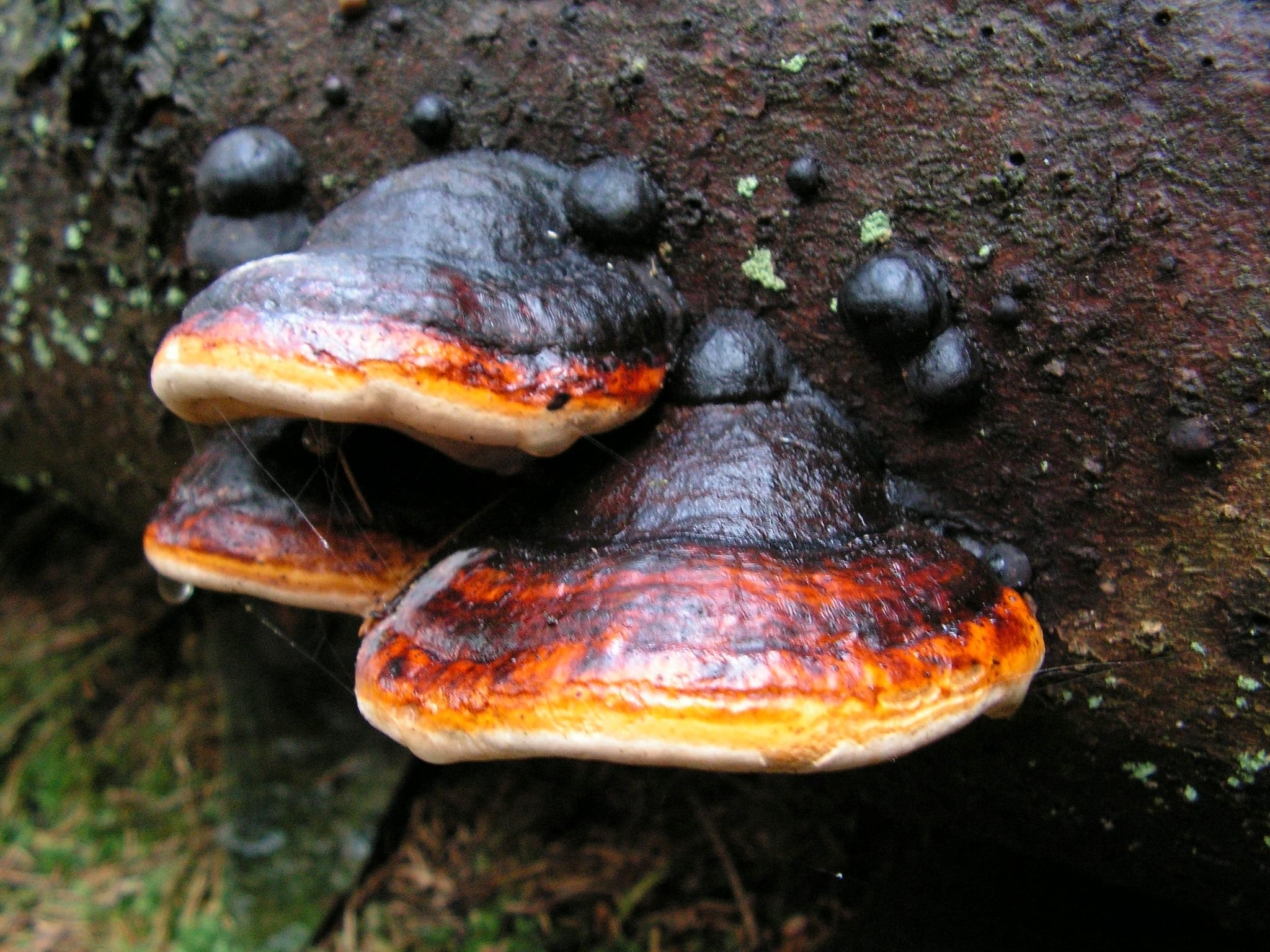
Fomitopsis pinicola (Fomitopsidaceae)

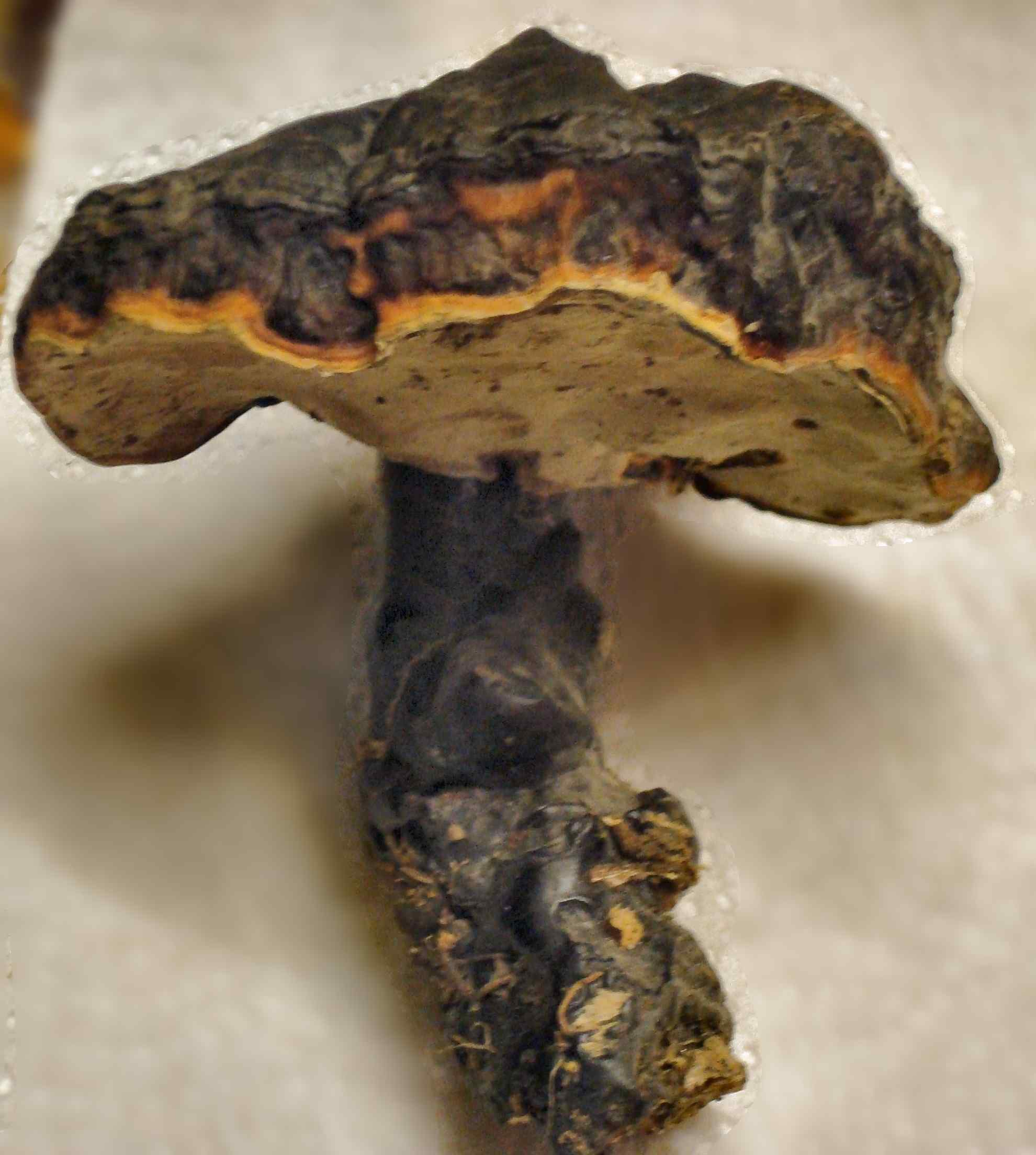
Ganoderma lucidum (Ganodermataceae)

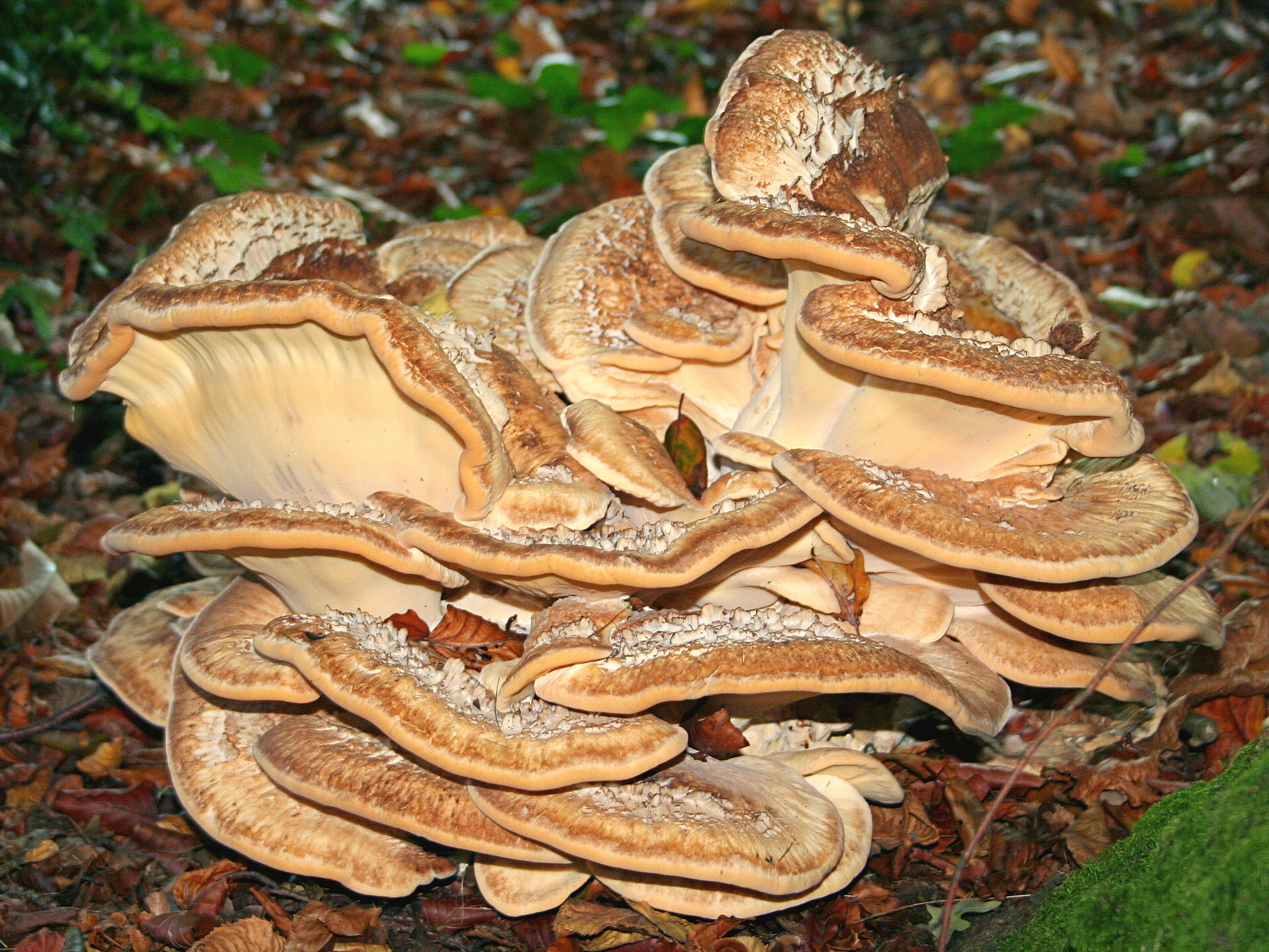
Meripilus giganteus (Meripilaceae)

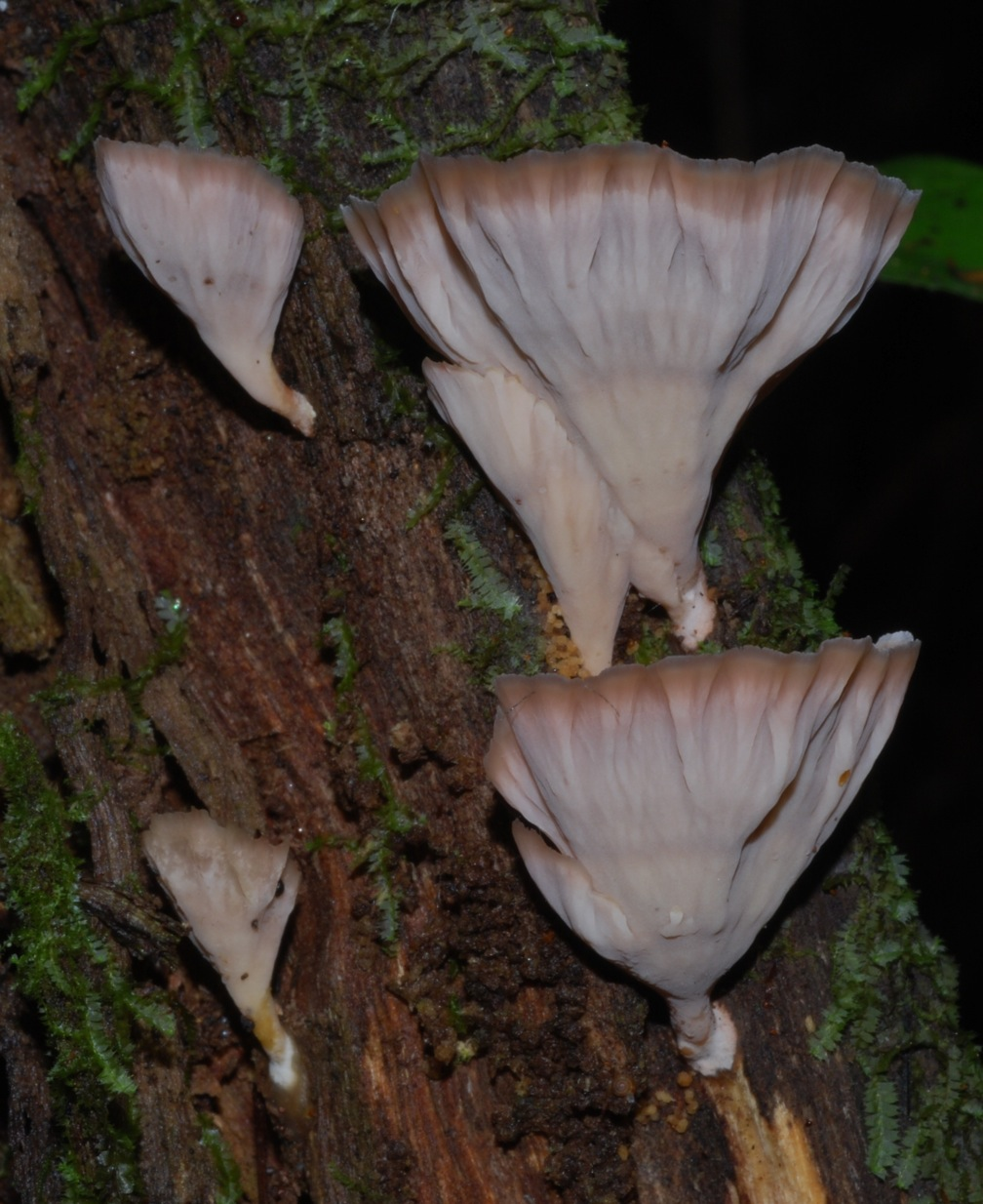
Podoscypha petalodes (Meruliaceae)

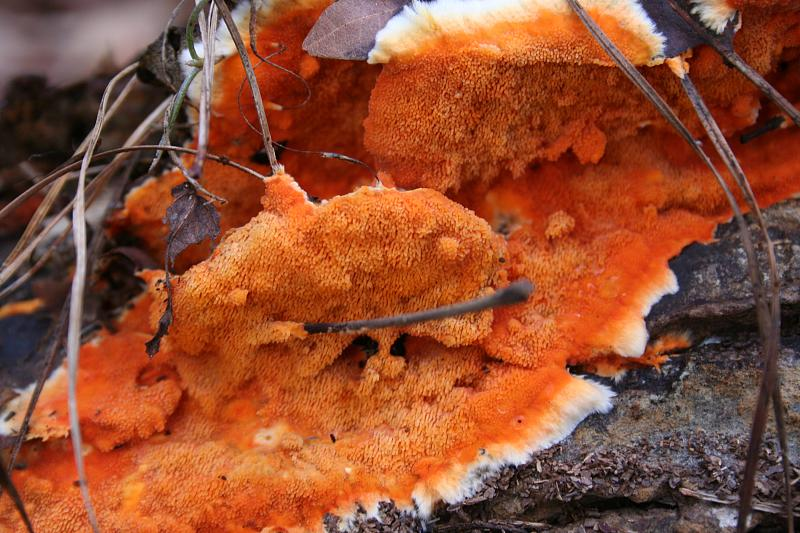
Phanerochaete chrysorhizon (Phanerochaetaceae)

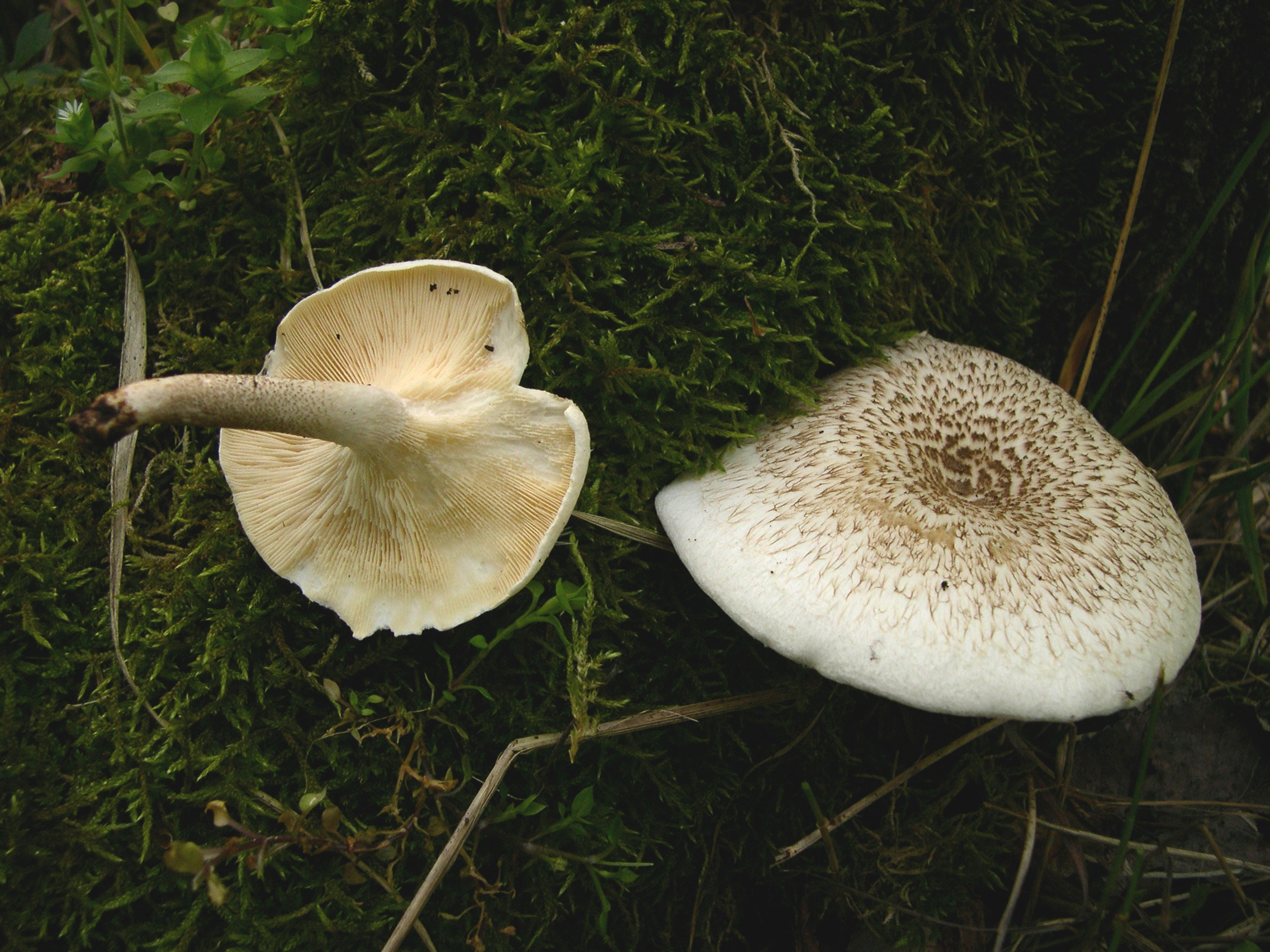
Lentinus tigrinus (Polyporaceae)
