= Heart rot =

Fungal disease of trees

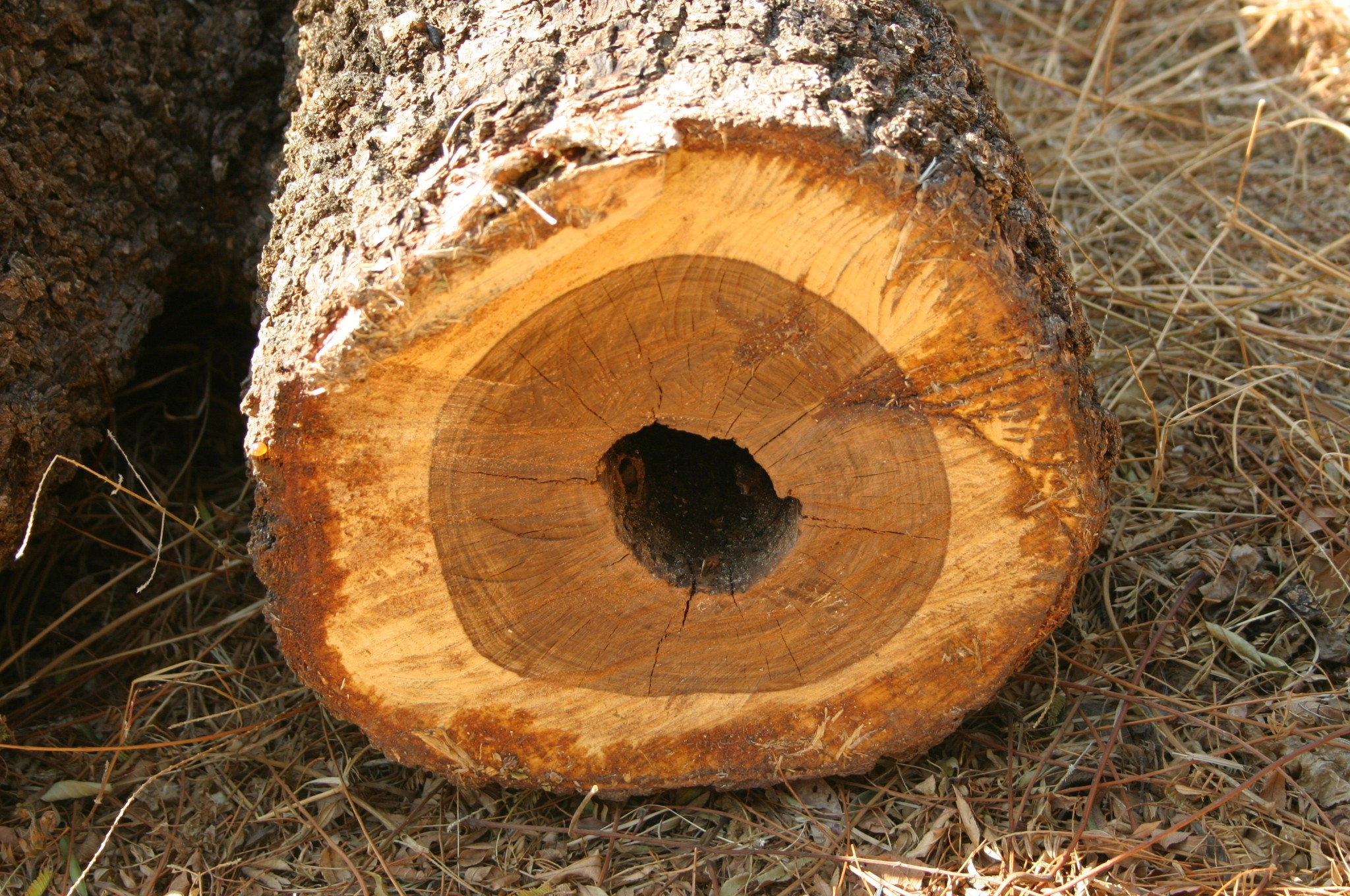
Spirostachys africana log with heart-rot

In trees, heart rot is a fungal disease that causes the decay of wood at the center of the trunk and branches. Fungi enter the tree through wounds in the bark and decay the heartwood. The diseased heartwood softens, making trees structurally weaker and prone to breakage. Heart rot is a major factor in the economics of logging and the natural growth dynamic of many older forests. Heart rot is prevalent throughout the world affecting all hardwood trees and can be very difficult to prevent. A good indication of heart rot is the presence of mushrooms or fungus conks on the tree.

== Biological cause ==
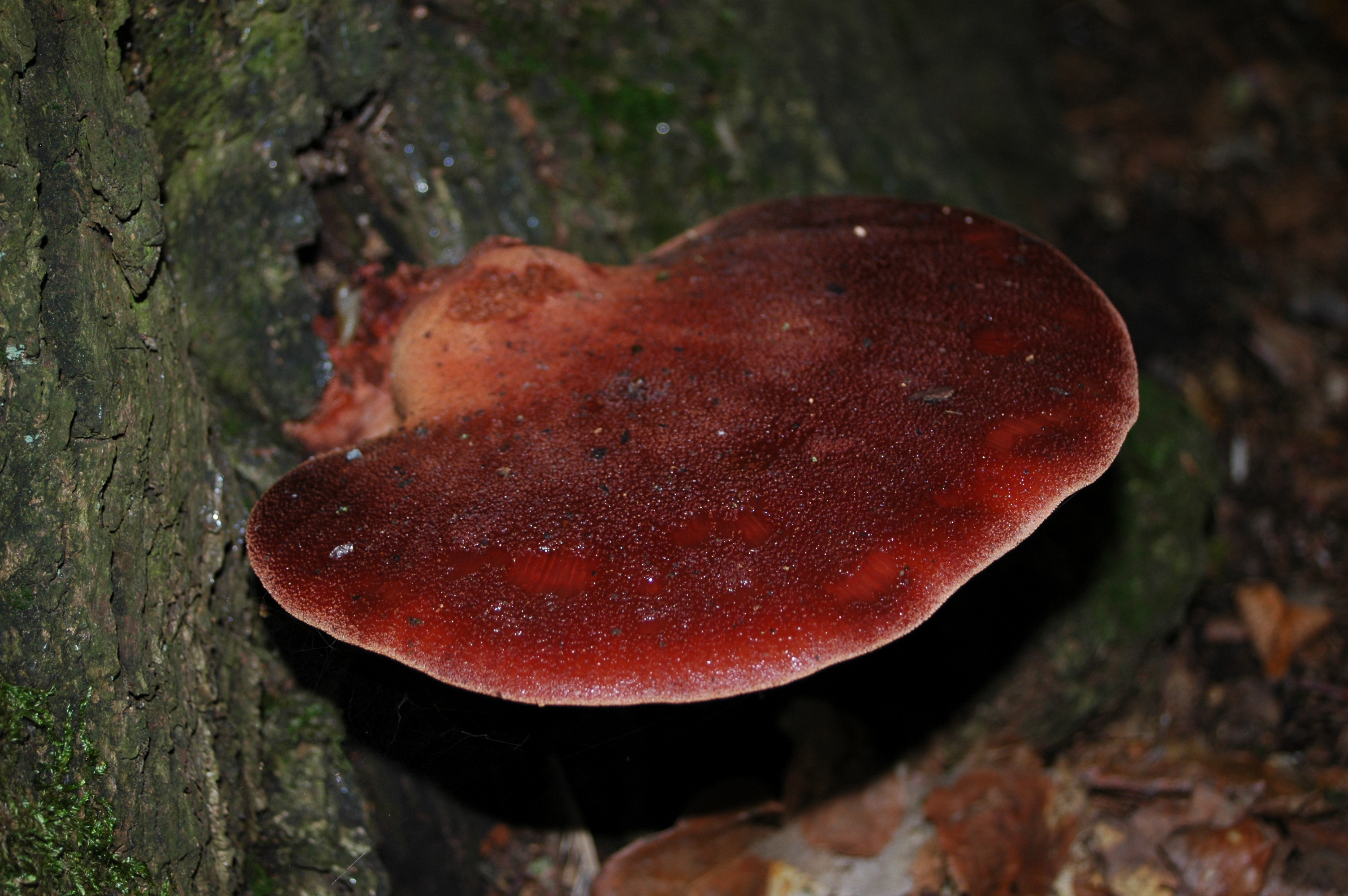
The bracket fungus Fistulina hepatica is one of many that cause heart rot.

Heart rot is caused by fungi entering the trunk of the tree through wounds in the bark. These wounds are areas of the tree where bare wood is exposed and usually, a result of improper pruning, fire damage, dead branches, insects, or even animal damage. The fungal spores enter the exposed wounds, germinate within the wood tissues, and slowly ingest the heartwood. The infection is a very slow process and can take from months to years, depending on conditions and tree health. An average fungus will advance in the heartwood by 6–8 centimeters per year, and extensive development in the wood tissue is needed before mushrooms or conks are produced.

=== Types of fungus ===
- Laetiporus sulphureus (sulphur shelf or chicken of the woods) causes Brown cubical rot
- Porodaedalea pini formally Phellinus pini (red heart fungus): Causes red heart disease (also known as red ring rot) in pine and conifer trees
- Inonotus obliquus Chaga or Chaga mushroom causes white heart rot primarily in birch trees.
- Fomitopsis genus:
  - Fomitopsis pinicola (Red-belted conk)
  - Fomitopsis mounceae formally F. pinicola
  - Fomitopsis schrenkii
  - Fomitopsis betulina formally Piptoporus betulinus. Exclusively on birch trees in the northern hemisphere
  - Fomitopsis officinalis (Quinine conk)
  - Fomitopsis spraguei (Fomitopsis spraguei): Green cheese polypore causes brown cubical rot, a hardwood disease.
  - Fomitopsis malicola (synonyms: Antrodia malicola, Coriolellus malicola, or Brunneoporus malicola) causes brown cubical rot in dead or injured hardwood.
  - Fomitopsis meliae causes brown wood rot in some trees and plants. In 2025 evidence point to causing damping-off diseases in seedlings, especially coffee seeds.

== Impact ==
Heart rot fungi have both a huge economic and environmental impact. The fungi only target the nonliving wood tissue of the heartwood and do not affect the living sapwood. Initially, infected heartwood is discolored but not structurally compromised. As the fungi grow they decay more wood and the tissue becomes increasingly soft and weak. The tree can still grow around the decayed heartwood because the live wood tissue is not affected. The growth around decayed areas of heartwood creates structural weaknesses in the tree. Trees with extensive decay are more susceptible to broken branches and trunks.

=== Logging ===
Heart rot causes huge profit loss in the logging industry every year due to damaged and decayed timber. It is estimated that about one third of annual timber (20 billion board feet) harvest is lost due to some form of rot. Trees wounded from machinery or other falling trees are more susceptible to heart rot. It results in trees that cannot be sold due to substantial decay and introducing ideal rot conditions into younger forests that would normally not be as susceptible.

=== Environmental ===
Heart rot and other tree disease serve as factors of environmental change. This is magnified in areas that are not prone to large-scale dynamic disturbances like wildfires or are dominated by old-growth timber. In older-growth forests, trees are unable to combat heart rot effectively because they grow at a much slower pace. Extensive rot causes these trees to be more susceptible to high winds and trunk fracture. As the old growth dies out, it allows new growth to take its place, altering the dynamic of the environment. Decaying trees and tree hollows also provide shelter to animals as well as microorganisms. Through this process of dynamic change, heart rot contributes to biologically diverse habitats.

== Prevention and control ==
The prevention of heart rot can be a very difficult task, but there are effective measures to minimize damage. These methods include facilitating healthy growth, minimizing wounds, and proper pruning of branches. A healthy tree naturally combats heart rot through a process called compartmentalization. The tree grows around the decayed wood tissue and prevents the fungus from spreading to a larger area of the trunk. Providing a tree with the necessary nutrients, water, and growing conditions will promote healthy growth and minimize rot. The bark is the tree's main defense against disease; reducing the amount of large wounds and bare wood, especially in older trees, helps prevent rot.

=== Pruning techniques ===
Pruning focuses on removing dead or diseased branches with minimal damage done to the tree. Branches connect to the trunk and grow from the branch collar. While the branch itself may be dead, the branch collar is still healthy and resistant to disease. It is from the branch collar that a new limb will generate and grow, so it is important not to damage it while pruning. Make clean cuts at the base of the branch adjacent to the branch collar. Small branch stubs (larger than three inches) will inhibit the growth process and provide fungi with ideal growth environments.
