= Irene Mounce =

Canadian mycologist (1894–1987)

Irene Mounce (1894–1987) was a Canadian scientist who specialized in the mating systems of wood-destroying fungi, Hymenomycetes. She was a mycologist at the Central Experimental Farm, Ottawa, with Canada's federal department of agriculture (now Agriculture and Agri-Food Canada). Her diligence and insight broke new ground in mycology and her successes made the way easier for other members of her sex.

== Biography ==
Irene Mounce was born in Union (now Cumberland), British Columbia in 1894. She earned her B.A. (1918) and M.A. (1920) from the University of British Columbia and a M.Sc. (1922) from the University of Manitoba where she studied under Arthur Henry Reginald Buller (studying mating systems of Coprinus). In 1920, Irene Mounce was the first woman to do graduate studies in agriculture, eventually earning her two graduate degrees in botany. She financed much of her education through scholarships and laboratory work. She obtained her Ph.D. from the University of Toronto (1929) where she studied under Joseph Horace Faull. During a visit to Robert Hartig in Germany, Faull saw the value of studying the mycelium of the wood-decay fungi in the laboratory and tutored Irene's research in this area. In her doctoral studies, Mounce showed the complex genetic makeup of Fomes pinicola, which became the basis of the classic paper on cultural characteristics of the Polyporaceae, published in 1929. After a mycological career spanning about 25 years and her resignation at age 50, Mounce died June 26, 1987, in Vancouver, British Columbia.

== Career ==
In 1924, Mounce joined the Division of Botany at Agriculture and Agri-Food Canada, in Ottawa, Ontario. In the summer of 1925, she made her first trip to the Queen Charlotte Islands to investigate the decays of Sitka spruce trees. This research led to the successful identification of the majority of these pathogens in non-fruiting culture. During the 1930s, Mounce was in charge of three major projects: development of the herbarium of wood-decay fungi, development of the reference collection of pure cultures of pathogenic fungi, and studies on the sexuality and cultural characters of wood-decay fungi. During World War II she was also assigned to the task force studying seed-borne disease.

In 1938 she transferred to the Saanichton laboratory in British Columbia to study vegetable diseases. Except for wood-destroying fungi, collected by Irene Mounce and others of the Division of Botany, no other systematic collecting of fungi in British Columbia was possible until the large-scale botanicomycological exploration by the division in the 1950s. Mounce worked at Saanichton's Dominion Laboratory of Plant Pathology from 1942 to 1945, but had to resign at age 50 because she got married. The employment of married women was forbidden in Canada until 1955.

== Eponymous taxa ==
The fungus Fomitopsis mounceae was named after Irene Mounce when the species was split from the European Fomitopsis pinicola. The name was given in honour of the foundational work by Mounce that allowed for the resolution of the genus, and as a tribute to her significant contributions to the field of mycology.

== Honours and awards ==
- Governor General's Gold Medal, University of British Columbia (on display in the Special Collections at the university).
- Hudson's Bay Company Research Fellowship as well as a Studentship, Canadian Honorary Advisory Council for Scientific and Industrial Research.

== Selected publications ==
- Mounce, I. (1926) A preliminary note on Fomes pinicola Fr. and Pholiota adiposa Fr. – two heterothallic species of wood-destroying fungi. Phytopathology 16: 757–758.
- Mounce, I. (1929) Studies in forest pathology. II. The biology of Fomes pinicola (Sw.) Cooke. Canada Dept. of Agriculture Bull. 1 1, new series. 56 pp.
