= Fomitopsis palustris =

Scientific classification
- Kingdom: Fungi
- Division: Basidiomycota
- Class: Agaricomycetes
- Order: Polyporales
- Family: Fomitopsidaceae
- Genus: Fomitopsis
- Species: F. palustris

Binomial name
- Fomitopsis palustris (Berk. & M.A.Curtis) Gilb. & Ryvarden (1985)

Synonyms
- Polyporus palustris Berk. & M.A.Curtis (1872)

Species of fungus

Fomitopsis palustris is a species of polypore fungus in the family Fomitopsidaceae. It causes brown rot, a disease of wood that results from the enzymatic breakdown of the wood component cellulose, but not lignin. Several enzymes involved in the wood-decay process have been biochemically characterized. The whole genome sequence of F. palustris was reported in 2017.

== Wood decay enzymes ==
Fomitopsis palustris is known to possess three different cellulase enzymes.

An endoglucanase, named EG-II, has been purified and characterized from this species in 2008; it is believed to assist in the wood rot process by loosening the polysaccharide network in cell walls by disentangling hemicelluloses associated with cellulose.
