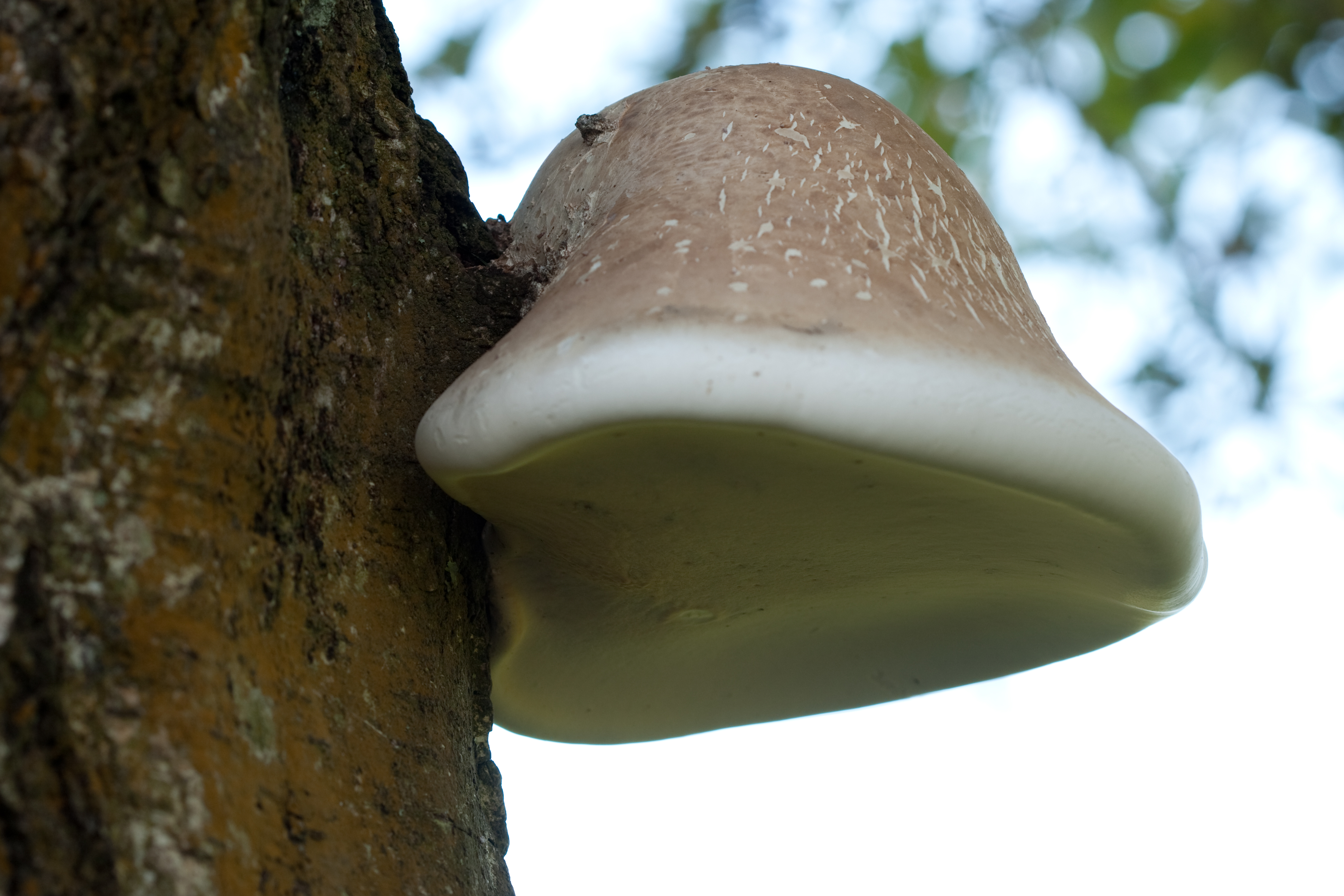

Conservation status
- Secure (NatureServe)

Scientific classification
- Kingdom: Fungi
- Division: Basidiomycota
- Class: Agaricomycetes
- Order: Polyporales
- Family: Fomitopsidaceae
- Genus: Fomitopsis
- Species: F. betulina

Binomial name
- Fomitopsis betulina (Bull.) B.K.Cui, M.L.Han & Y.C.Dai (2016)

Synonyms
- Boletus betulinus Bull. (1788); Piptoporus betulinus (Bull.) P.Karst. (1881)

= Fomitopsis betulina =

Common bracket fungus

Fomitopsis betulina
- Mycological characteristics
- Pores on hymenium
- No distinct cap
- Hymenium is decurrent
- Lacks a stipe
- Spore print is white
- Ecology is parasitic
- Edibility is inedible

Fomitopsis betulina (previously Piptoporus betulinus), commonly known as the birch polypore, birch bracket, or razor strop, is a common bracket fungus and, as the name suggests, grows almost exclusively on birch trees. The brackets burst out from the bark of the tree, and these fruit bodies can last for more than a year.

== Taxonomy ==
The fungus was originally described by Jean Bulliard in 1788 as Boletus betulinus. It was transferred to the genus Piptoporus by Petter Karsten in 1881. Molecular phylogenetic studies suggested that the species was more closely related to Fomitopsis than to Piptoporus, and the fungus was reclassified to Fomitopsis in 2016.

The specific epithet betulina refers to the genus of the host plant (Betula). Common names for the fungus include birch bracket, birch polypore, and razorstrop fungus.

== Description ==
The fruit bodies (basidiocarps) are pale, with a smooth greyish-brown top surface, while the creamy white underside has hundreds of pores that contain the spores. The fruit body has a rubbery texture, becoming corky with age. Wood decayed by the fungus, and cultures of its mycelium, often smell distinctly of green apples. The spores are cylindrical to ellipsoidal in shape, and measure 3–6 by 1.5–2 μm.

Fomitopsis betulina has a bipolar mating system where monokaryons or germinating spores can only mate and form a fertile dikaryon with an individual that possesses a different mating-type factor. There are at least 33 different mating-type factors within the British population of this fungus. These factors are all variants or alleles of a single gene, as opposed to the tetrapolar mating system of some other basidiomycete species, which involves two genes.

== Distribution, habitat and ecology ==
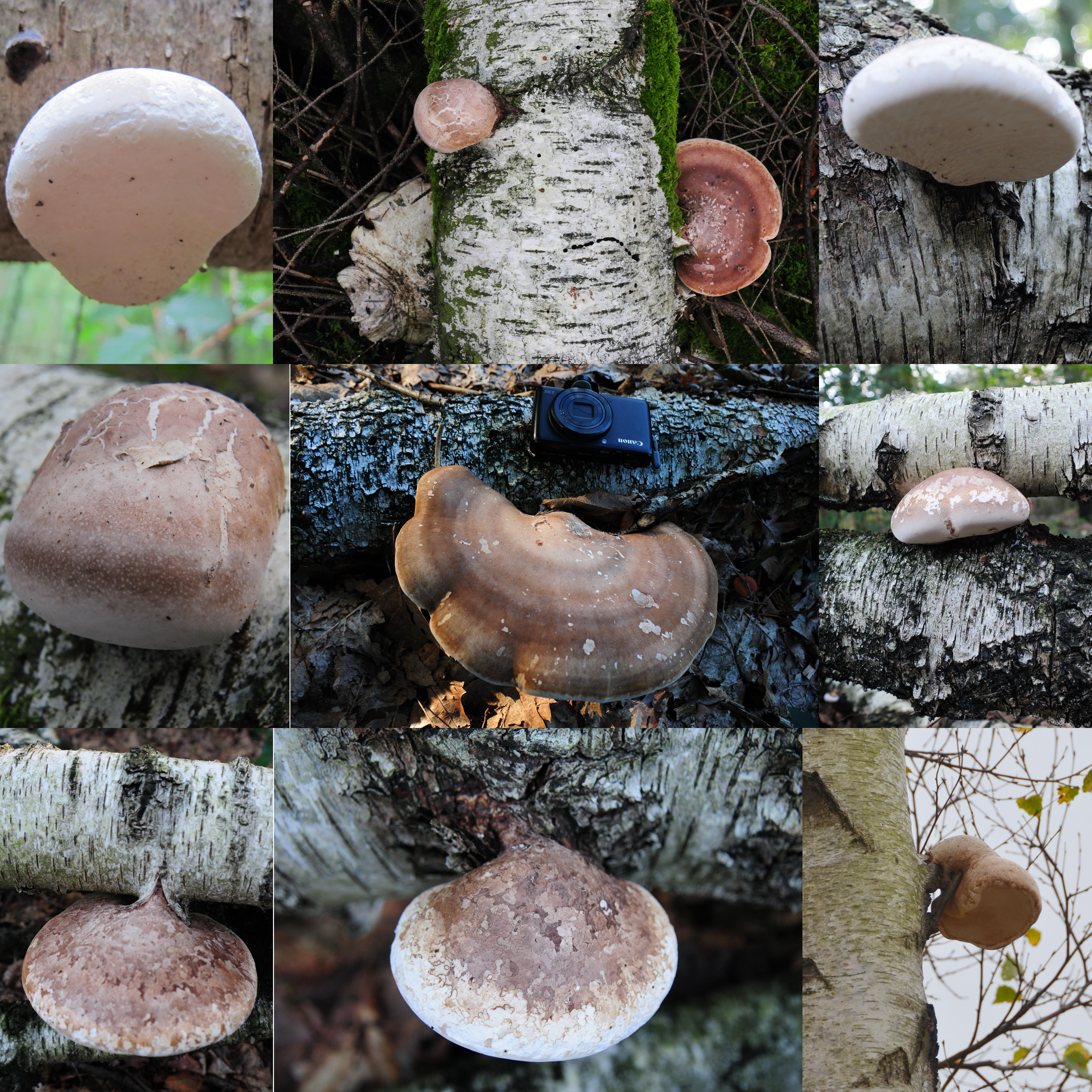
Variations in size, shape, and surface colour

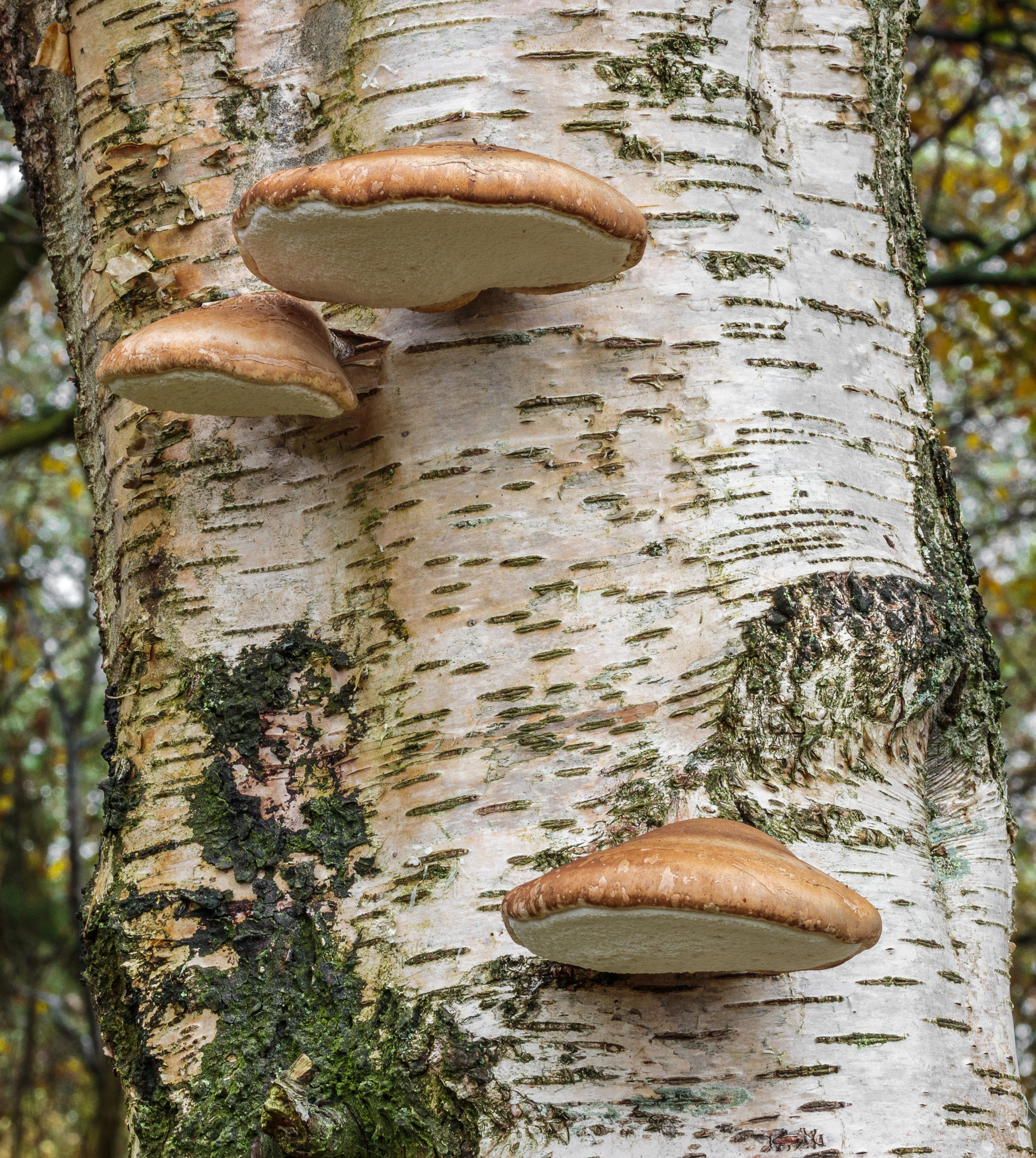
Three young fungi on a birch trunk.

Fomitopsis betulina is one of the most common species of brown rot fungi. The geographic distribution of F. betulina appears to be restricted to the Northern Hemisphere, including Northern America, Europe, and Asia. It is only found on birch trees, including Betula pendula, B. pubescens, B. papyrifera, and B. obscura. There is some doubt about the ability of isolates from the European continent, North America and the British Isles to interbreed.

It is a necrotrophic parasite on weakened birches, and will cause brown rot and eventually death, being one of the most common fungi visible on dead birches. It is likely that the birch bracket fungus becomes established in small wounds and broken branches and may lie dormant for years, compartmentalised into a small area by the tree's own defence mechanisms, until something occurs to weaken the tree. Fire, drought and suppression by other trees are common causes of such stress.

In most infections there is only one fungal individual present, but occasionally several individuals may be isolated from a single tree, and in these cases it is possible that the birch bracket fungus entered after something else killed the tree. These fungal "individuals" can sometimes be seen if a slice of brown-rotted birch wood is incubated in a plastic bag for several days. This allows the white mycelium of the fungus to grow out of the surface of the wood. If more than one individual dikaryon is present, lines of intraspecific antagonism form as the two individual mycelia interact and repel each other.

The fungus can harbor a large number of species of insects that depend on it for food and as breeding sites. In a large-scale study of over 2,600 fruit bodies collected in eastern Canada, 257 species of arthropods, including 172 insects and 59 mites, were found.

The fungus is eaten by the caterpillars of the fungus moth Nemaxera betulinella. Adults of the pleasing fungus beetle Aporotritoma pulchra have also been recorded from F.betulina, but it does not seem to be a regular food source for them.

Old fruit bodies that have survived the winter are often colonized by the white to pale yellow fungus Hypocrea pulmonata.

== Uses ==
The velvety cut surface of the fruit body was traditionally used as a strop for finishing the edges on razors, and as a mounting material for insect collections. It has also been used as tinder and anesthetic.

It is considered inedible, except potentially when young.

=== Research on chemical constituents ===
Fomitopsis betulina has been widely used in traditional medicines, and has been extensively researched for its phytochemistry and pharmacological activity. Phytochemicals include phenolic acids, indole compounds, sterols, and triterpenes, especially betulin and betulinic acid.

Agaric acid, found in the fruit body of the fungus, is poisonous to the parasitic whipworm Trichuris trichiura. The fungus was carried by "Ötzi the Iceman" — the 5,300 year old mummy found in Tyrol — with speculation that the fungus may have been used as a laxative to expel whipworm.

== See also ==
- Fomes fomentarius, another fungus carried by Ötzi the Iceman
