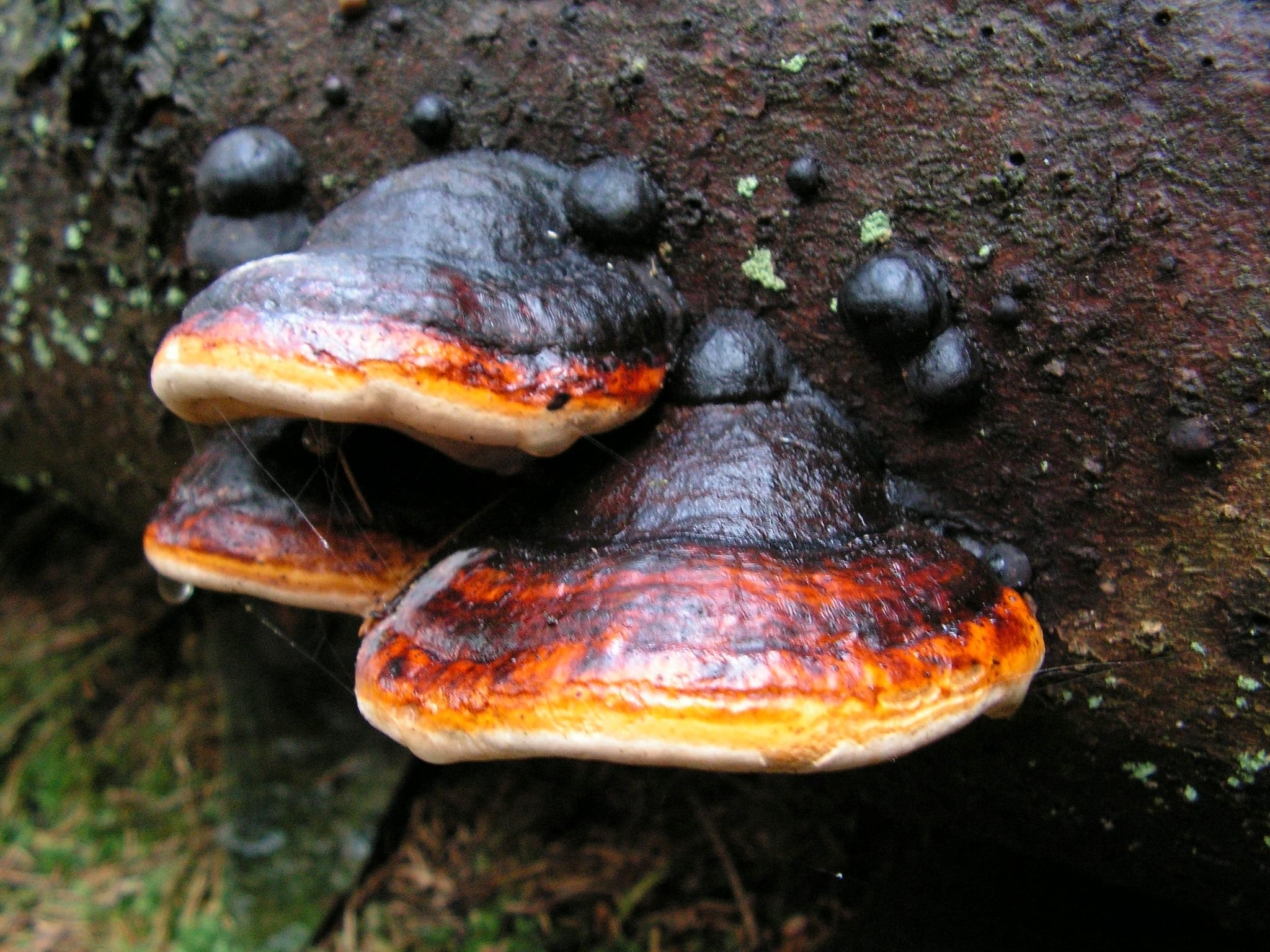
- Fomitopsis pinicola

Scientific classification
- Kingdom: Fungi
- Division: Basidiomycota
- Class: Agaricomycetes
- Order: Polyporales
- Family: Fomitopsidaceae
- Genus: Fomitopsis; P.Karst. (1881)

Type species
- Fomitopsis pinicola (Sw.) P.Karst. (1881)

Synonyms
- Agaricon Tourn. ex Adans. (1763); Agaricum P.Micheli ex Haller (1768); Agarico-pulpa Paulet (1793); Agaricum Paulet (1812); Laricifomes Kotl. & Pouzar (1957); Pilatoporus Kotl. & Pouzar (1990); Rhodofomes Kotl. & Pouzar (1990)

= Fomitopsis =

Genus of fungi

Fomitopsis is a genus of more than 40 species of bracket fungi in the family Fomitopsidaceae.

== Taxonomy ==
The genus was circumscribed by Finnish mycologist Petter Karsten in 1881 with Fomitopsis pinicola as the type species. Molecular analysis indicates that Fomitopsis belongs to the antrodia clade, which contains about 70 percent of brown-rot fungi. Other genera that join Fomitopsis in the core antrodia group include Amyloporia, Antrodia, Daedalea, Melanoporia, Piptoporus, and Rhodonia. Studies have indicated that Fomitopsis and Piptoporus were phylogenetically heterogenous, and the type of that genus, Piptoporus betulinus, is in the Fomitopsis core group. This fungus, well known for its use by Ötzi the Iceman, was transferred to Fomitopsis in 2016.

The whole genome sequence of Fomitopsis palustris was reported in 2017.

The generic name combines the name Fomes, a similar-looking genus, with the Ancient Greek word ὄψις ("appearance").

== Description and ecology ==
Fomitopsis species have fruit bodies that are mostly perennial, with forms ranging from sessile to effused-reflexed (partially crust-like and partially pileate). Fruit body texture is typically tough to woody, and the pore surface is white to tan or pinkish-colored with mostly small and regular pores. Microscopically, Fomitopsis has a dimitic hyphal system with clamped generative hyphae. The spores are hyaline, thin-walled, smooth, roughly spherical to cylindrical, and are negative in Melzer's reagent. Fomitopsis fungi cause a brown rot.

A possible Fomitopsis (but the identification was very uncertain) was once recorded in association with the little-known pleasing fungus beetle Haematochiton elateroides; however, it is suspected that the beetles were not feeding on the fungus, but simply hibernating in the dead log on which it grew.

== Species ==
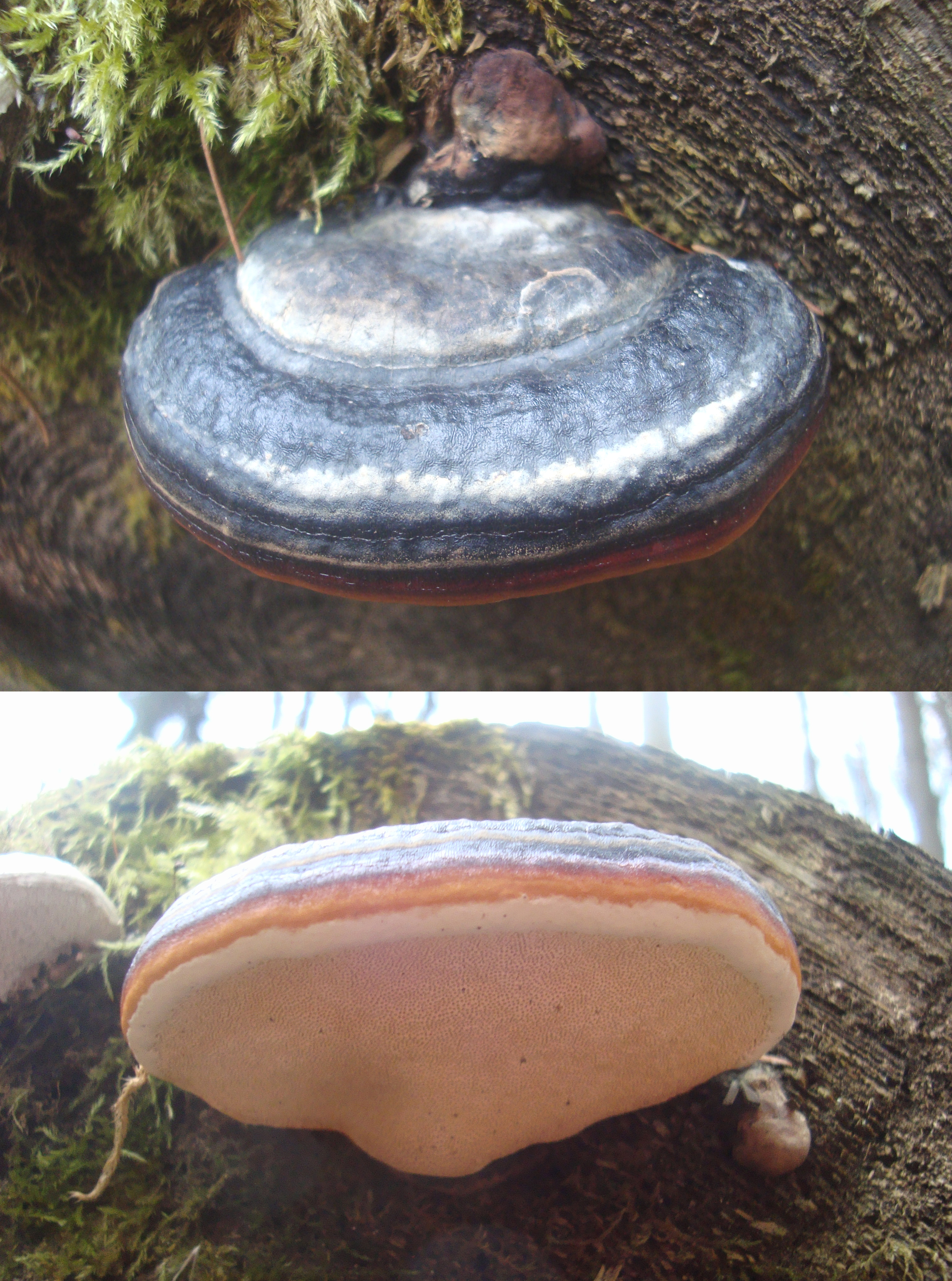
Fomitopsis rosea, Czech Republic

More than 40 species have been accepted in Fomitopsis.

- Fomitopsis anhuiensis X.F.Ren & X.Q.Zhang (1992)
- Fomitopsis avellanea (Bres.) Ryvarden (1988) – Madagascar
- Fomitopsis betulina (Bull.) B.K.Cui, M.L.Han & Y.C.Dai (2016) – widespread in Northern Hemisphere
- Fomitopsis cajanderi (P.Karst.) Kotl. & Pouzar (1957) – North America
- Fomitopsis cana B.K.Cui, Hai J.Li & M.L.Han (2013) – China
- Fomitopsis castanea Imazeki (1949)
- Fomitopsis concava (Cooke) G.Cunn. (1950)
- Fomitopsis cystidiata B.K.Cui & M.L.Han (2014) – China
- Fomitopsis cytisina (Berk.) Bondartsev & Singer (1941)
- Fomitopsis durescens (Overh. ex J.Lowe) Gilb. & Ryvarden (1986)
- Fomitopsis epileucina (Pilát) Ryvarden & Gilb. (1993)
- Fomitopsis euosma Corner (1989)
- Fomitopsis hainaniana J.D.Zhao & X.Q.Zhang (1991) – China
- Fomitopsis hartmannii (Cooke) M.D. Barrett & Spirin)
- Fomitopsis iberica Melo & Ryvarden (1989) – Europe
- Fomitopsis incarnatus K.M.Kim, J.S.Lee & H.S.Jung (2008)
- Fomitopsis kiyosumiensis Imazeki & R.Sasaki (1955)
- Fomitopsis labyrinthica Bernicchia & Ryvarden (1996)
- Fomitopsis lignea (Berk.) Ryvarden (1972) – St.Vincent
- Fomitopsis maire (G.Cunn.) P.K.Buchanan & Ryvarden (1988)
- Fomitopsis minuta Aime & Ryvarden (2007) – Guyana
- Fomitopsis minutispora Rajchenb. (1995) – Argentina
- Fomitopsis mounceae Haight & Nakasone (2019) – Canada, USA
- Fomitopsis niveomarginata L.W.Zhou & Y.L.Wei (2012) – China
- Fomitopsis ochracea Ryvarden & Stokland (2008)
- Fomitopsis officinalis (Vill.) Bondartsev & Singer (1941) – Europe
- Fomitopsis ostreiformis (Berk.) T.Hatt. (2003)
- Fomitopsis palustris (Berk. & M.A.Curtis) Gilb. & Ryvarden (1985) – United States
- Fomitopsis pinicola (Sw.) P.Karst. (1881) – Europe; North America
- Fomitopsis pseudopetchii (Lloyd) Ryvarden (1972)
- Fomitopsis quadrans (Berk. & Broome) D.A.Reid (1963)
- Fomitopsis quercina (L.) V. Spirin & O. Miettinen
- Fomitopsis rosea (Alb. & Schwein.) P.Karst. (1881) – North America, Dominican Republic, Europe
- Fomitopsis rubida (Berk.) A.Roy & A.B.De (1996) – Philippines; Tanzania
- Fomitopsis rufolaccata (Bose) Dhanda (1981)
- Fomitopsis sanmingensis J.D.Zhao & X.Q.Zhang (1991) – China
- Fomitopsis scalaris (Cooke) Ryvarden (1984)
- Fomitopsis schrenkii Haight & Nakasone (2019) – Canada, USA
- Fomitopsis scortea (Corner) T.Hatt. (2003)
- Fomitopsis sensitiva (Lloyd) R.Sasaki (1954)
- Fomitopsis singularis (Corner) T.Hatt. (2003)
- Fomitopsis spraguei (Berk. & M.A.Curtis) Gilb. & Ryvarden (1985) – Portugal
- Fomitopsis subfeei B.K.Cui & M.L.Han (2014)
- Fomitopsis subtropica B.K.Cui & Hai J.Li (2013) – China
- Fomitopsis subvinosa (Corner) T.Hatt. & Sotome (2013)
- Fomitopsis widdringtoniae Masuka & Ryvarden (1993) – Malawi
- Fomitopsis zuluensis (Wakef.) Ryvarden (1972)
- Fomitopsis sp (Sudhakar, N.) Karthikeyan, G., Shurya, R., Rajha Viknesh, A.M., Ganesan, V. and Sudhakar, N. (2019)India
