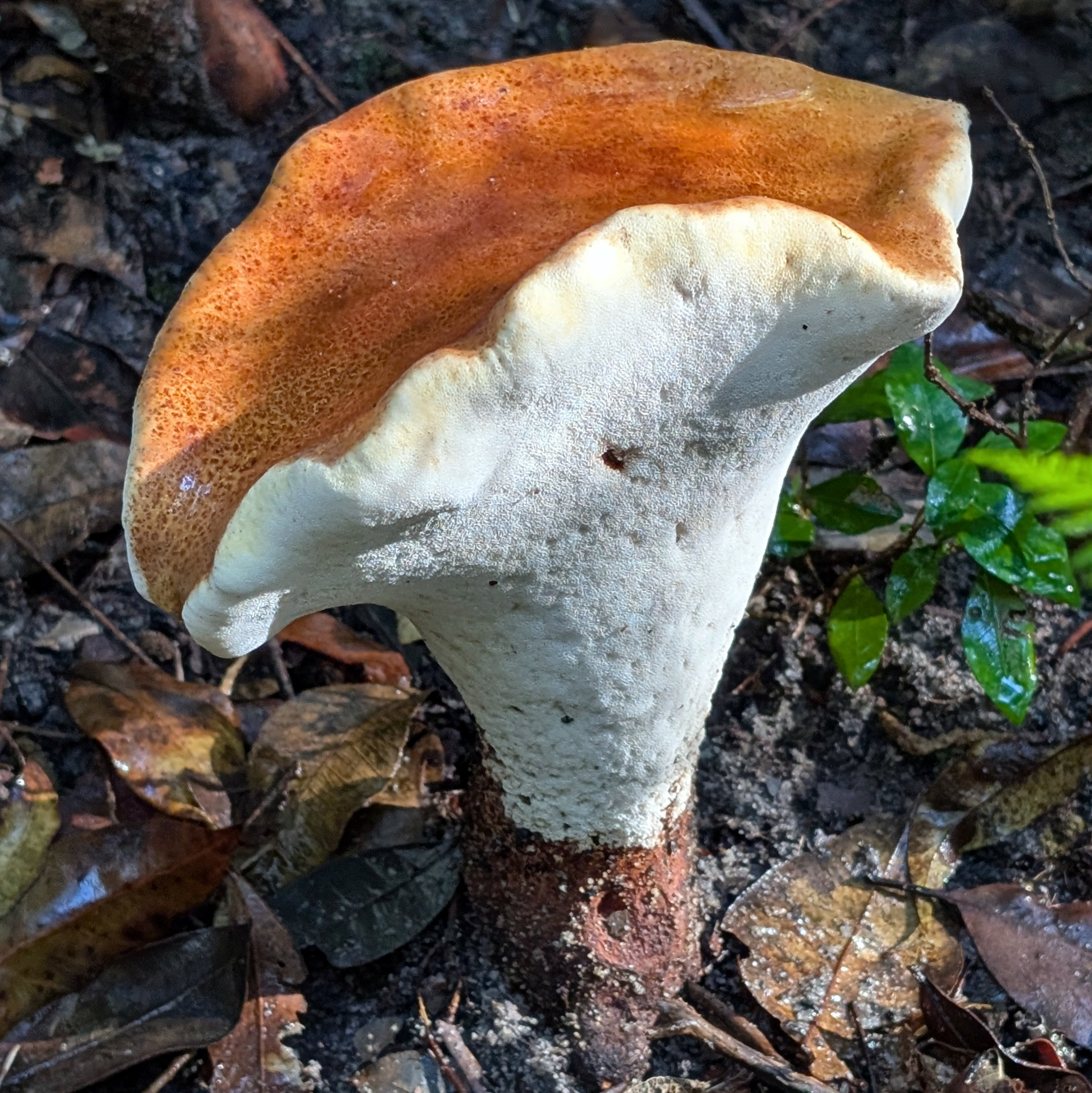
- Ferndale Park, Australia

Scientific classification
- Domain: Eukaryota
- Kingdom: Fungi
- Division: Basidiomycota
- Class: Agaricomycetes
- Order: Polyporales
- Family: Fomitopsidaceae
- Genus: Fomitopsis
- Species: F. hartmannii

Binomial name
- Fomitopsis hartmannii (Cooke) M.D. Barrett & Spirin

= Fomitopsis hartmannii =

Species of fungus

Fomitopsis hartmannii is a species of polypore fungus in the family Fomitopsidaceae.
