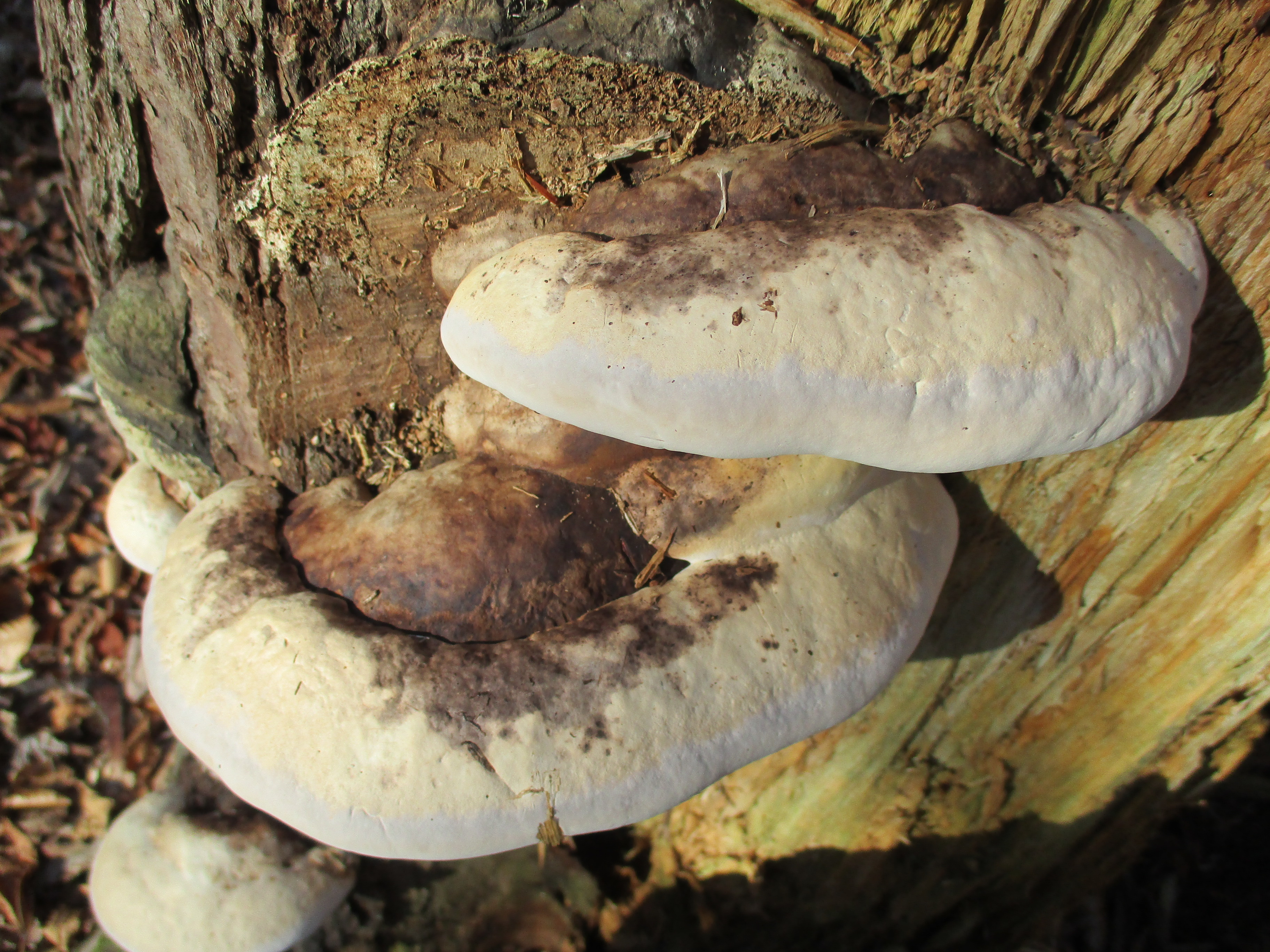

Scientific classification
- Kingdom: Fungi
- Division: Basidiomycota
- Class: Agaricomycetes
- Order: Polyporales
- Family: Fomitopsidaceae
- Genus: Fomitopsis
- Species: F. ochracea

Binomial name
- Fomitopsis ochracea Ryvarden & Stokland

= Fomitopsis ochracea =

Species of fungus

Fomitopsis ochracea is a polypore fungus found in North America. It was isolated from Albertan forests, and can be found in British Columbia. It has been isolated as far East as Newfoundland, but prefers Northern climates. It can be isolated throughout the Appalachian range, as far down as Georgia. It is a detritivore on both hardwood trees and conifers, causing a brown cubical rot. It is a member of the genus Fomitopsis, a common group of perennial fungi.

== Description ==
Fomitopsis ochracea is a fungus that may be shaped like a hoof or flattened in a fan-like manner. It can grow quite large, up to 20 cm in width and 7 cm thick. The top surface of the fungus is smooth and may be coloured white, grey, brown, or black, with parallel lines. It can have black or brown spotting on the surface. The underside is a creamy-white, with even, round pores. It can also become orange with age. If broken open, the context will be woody with a creamy-white colour and no bands. There is no visible bruising upon breaking open the body. There are about 5-6 pores present per millimetre. It can have a faint sweet odour.

Historically, this fungus has been misidentified as F. pinicola. When both species are immature, they can look very similar, but can be distinguished by lighting a match next to the surface of the fungus. F. pinicola will boil and melt in heat, while F. ochracea will not. If this test is not available, a simple bruise test can distinguish the two. F. pinicola will bruise a yellow colour when broken open, while F. ochracea will not bruise at all.
