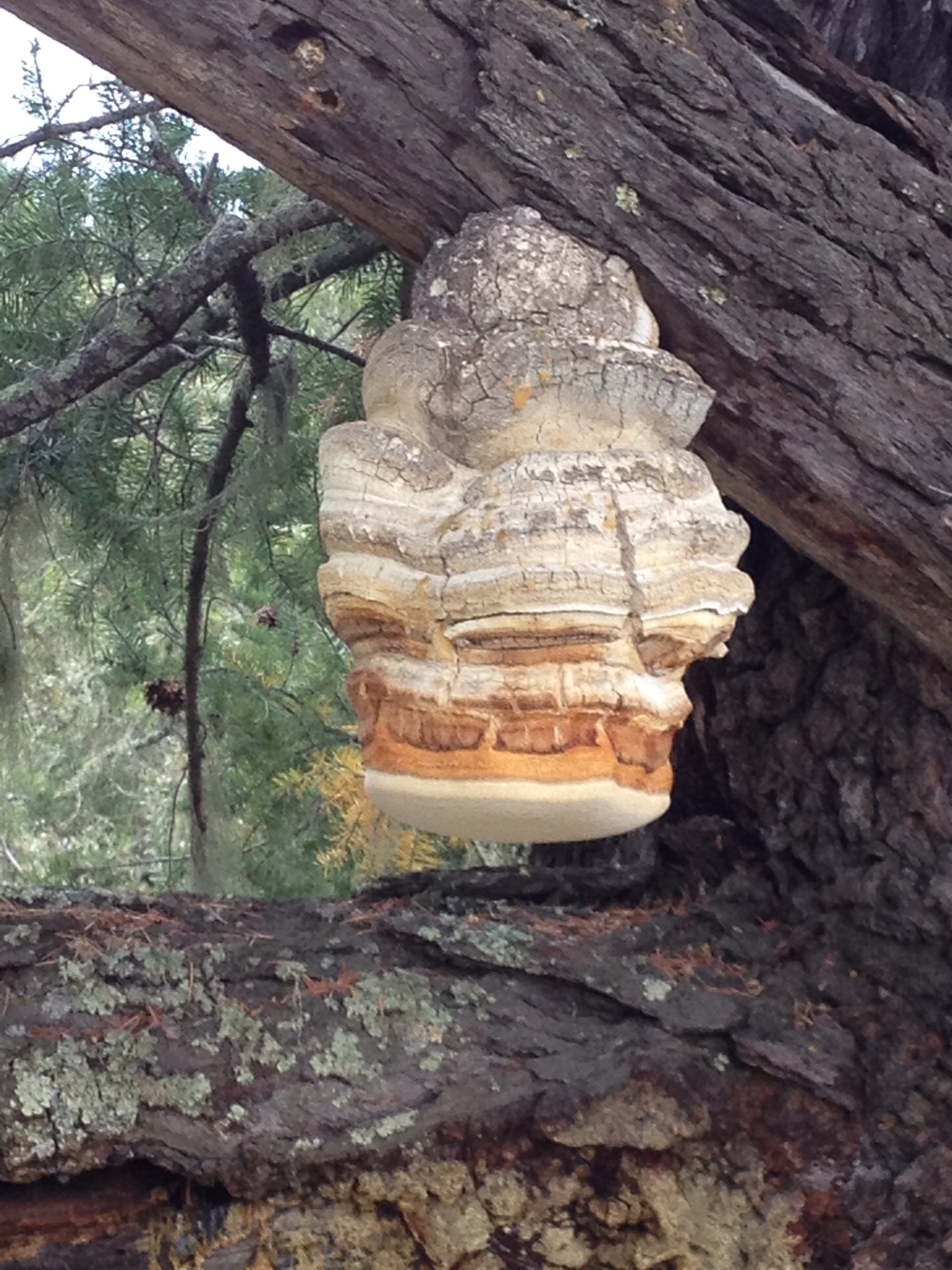

Conservation status
- Endangered (IUCN 3.1)

Scientific classification
- Kingdom: Fungi
- Division: Basidiomycota
- Class: Agaricomycetes
- Order: Polyporales
- Family: Laricifomitaceae
- Genus: Laricifomes; Kotl. & Pouzar (1957)
- Species: L. officinalis

Binomial name
- Laricifomes officinalis (Vill.) Kotl. & Pouzar (1957)

Synonyms
- Boletus officinalis Vill. (1789); Polyporus officinalis (Vill.) Fr. (1821); Piptoporus officinalis (Vill.) P.Karst. (1882); Cladomeris officinalis (Vill.) Quél. (1886); Ungulina officinalis (Vill.) Pat. (1900); Fomes officinalis (Vill.) Bres. (1931); Fomitopsis officinalis (Vill.) Bondartsev & Singer (1941); Agaricum officinale (Vill.) Donk (1971) [1974] Boletus laricis F.Rubel (1778); Boletus officinalis Batsch (1783); Boletus agaricum Pollini (1824); Fomes fuscatus Lázaro Ibiza (1916)

= Laricifomes officinalis =

Species of fungus

Laricifomes officinalis
- Mycological characteristics
- Pores on hymenium
- No distinct cap
- Hymenium attachment is irregular or not applicable
- Lacks a stipe
- Ecology is parasitic or saprotrophic
- Edibility is inedible

Laricifomes officinalis, also known as agarikon, eburiko, or the quinine conk, is a wood-decay fungus that grows in large conks on the trunks of trees. It causes brown heart rot on conifers in Eurasia, Morocco, and North America. This fungus is the only member of the genus Laricifomes.

There has been a history of human use of the fungus, from textiles, to ritualistic masks, and medicinal use; the name "quinine conk" refers to its bitter taste.

== Taxonomy ==
This mushroom is also known as Fomitopsis officinalis. DNA analyses showed that this species has genetical distance from Fomitopsis, and the name Laricifomes officinalis is favored.

The species epithet officinalis denotes an organism associated with herbalism or medicine.

== Description ==
These distinctive conks can be found growing out the side of or hanging off the branches of the host tree as high as 20 metres (65 feet) off the ground. These conks grow in a hoof-like shape or columnar, sometimes exceeding 65 centimetres (2 ft) in length and nearly 40 cm (1 1/2 ft) in girth, and can weigh up to 9 kilograms (20 pounds).

The young fruiting bodies are soft and yellow-white, soon hardening and becoming chalky throughout. As they age, they begin to exhibit red, brown, or gray developments in coloration, cracking cubically with thick white felts visible in larger cracks. The spores are white and ellipsoidal, being released through the bottom of the fruit during warmer months. The taste of both conks and felts is bitter and distinct. The scent is mild to mealy.

=== Similar species ===
It can resemble members of Phellinus which are blacker and prefer hardwood. Fomitopsis mounceae and its relatives may be similar, in addition to Ganoderma brownii.

== Distribution and ecology ==
Lariciformes officinalis resides predominantly in old-growth forests, growing in Eurasia, Morocco, and North America. It commonly prefers various Larix species, however it has been observed on certain species of coniferous trees in genus Pinus and Cedrus, for example.

A single "conk" usually indicates the complete infection of the tree, which can become a habitat for snag-nesting organisms.

== Conservation ==
Because the species is found mainly in old-growth forests, which are subject to diseases, invasive species, and deforestation, there has been a sharp decline in habitable space for the fungus. Due to major habitat loss, as well as unregulated harvesting, L. officinalis populations are decreasing.

While the fungus is particularly difficult to cultivate, there has been some promising research with inoculating larch branches. The preservation of the forests is necessary to prevent the fungus's extinction. Though there have been suggestions of researching ex situ cultivation for the purpose of preserving the species, few locations actually protect the forests from logging and conservation laws have been put in place for the fungus only in Germany, Lithuania, Poland, and Slovenia.

== Uses ==
=== Ethnomycology ===
Laricifomes officinalis, referred to as "bread of the ghosts" in local languages, was important both medicinally and spiritually to indigenous peoples of the Pacific Northwest Coast of North America, such as the Tlingit, Haida, and Tsimshian. The fruiting bodies were carved into masks, most likely with ritualistic purposes, and frequently marked the graves of tribal shamans. In addition, there is evidence that the mycelium growing in the rotting wood was being processed into textiles within these same peoples, creating a material similar in texture to leather.

=== Medicinal use ===
L. officinalis was used by the Ancient Greeks to treat consumption (tuberculosis) according to the writings of Pedanius Dioscorides in 65 CE, and by some indigenous people to treat smallpox. Later on, the conks were collected extensively for production of medicinal quinine, hence the name "quinine conk", which they were thought to contain because of the bitter taste of the powdered conk. In fact, they do not possess anti-malarial properties.

Mycologist Paul Stamets has performed numerous investigations of the species' biological activities; its extracts have demonstrated antiviral activity against a range of viruses in vitro. This activity has been specifically observed against pox family viruses, HSV-1 and HSV-2, Influenza A, Influenza B, and Mycobacterium tuberculosis in vitro.

Other researchers have identified novel chlorinated coumarins in the organism which demonstrated notably low minimum inhibitory concentrations against the Mycobacterium tuberculosis complex.
