= Tricarboxylic acid =

Organic carboxylic acid

A tricarboxylic acid is an organic carboxylic acid that contain three carboxyl functional groups (−COOH). A well-known example is citric acid.

== Prominent examples ==
Common name	IUPAC name	Molecular formula	Structural formula
citric acid	2-hydroxypropane-1,2,3-tricarboxylic acid	C_{6}H_{8}O_{7}	
isocitric acid	1-hydroxypropane-1,2,3-tricarboxylic acid	C_{6}H_{8}O_{7}	
aconitic acid	prop-1-ene-1,2,3-tricarboxylic acid	C_{6}H_{6}O_{6}	(cis-form and trans-form)
propane-1,2,3-tricarboxylic acid	propane-1,2,3-tricarboxylic acid	C_{3}H_{5}(COOH)_{3}	
agaric acid	2-hydroxynonadecane-1,2,3-tricarboxylic acid	C_{22}H_{40}O_{7}	
trimesic acid	benzene-1,3,5-tricarboxylic acid	C_{9}H_{6}O_{6}	

== Some prominent substituted tricarboxylic acids ==
Citric acid, is used in the citric acid cycle – also known as the tricarboxylic acid (TCA) cycle or Krebs cycle – which is fundamental to all aerobic organisms.

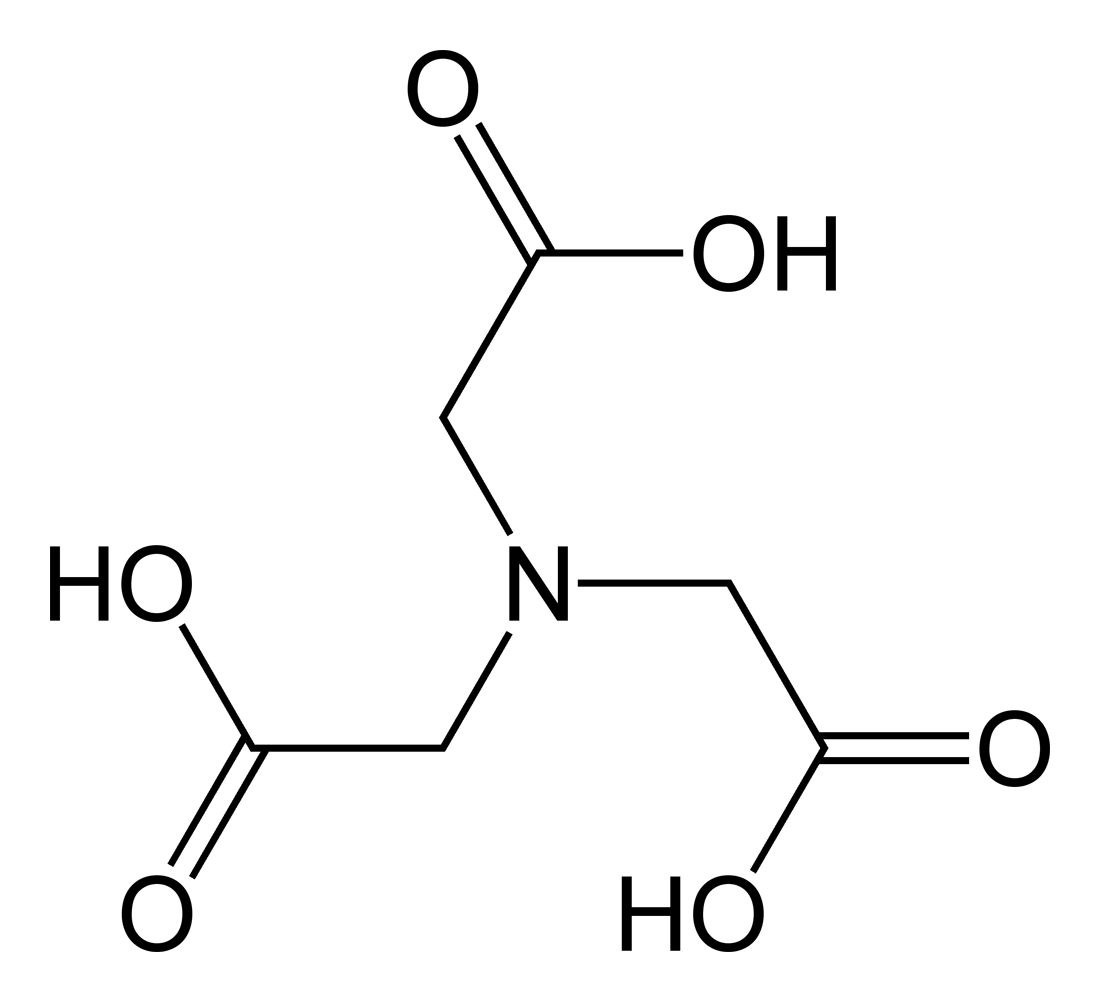
Nitrilotriacetic acid

Nitrilotriacetic acid (NTA) is a chelating agent for Ca^{2+}, Co^{2+}, Cu^{2+}, and Fe^{3+}.

== See also ==
- Citric acid cycle (tricarboxylic acid cycle)
- Dicarboxylic acid
- Mellitic acid
- Nitrilotriacetic acid

== Literature ==
- Ryan J. Mailloux, Robin Bériault, Joseph Lemire, Ranji Singh, Daniel R. Chénier, Robert D. Hamel, Vasu D. Appanna (2007). "The Tricarboxylic Acid Cycle, an Ancient Metabolic Network with a Novel Twist". PLOS ONE. 2 (8): e690. Bibcode:2007PLoSO...2..690M. doi:10.1371/journal.pone.0000690. PMC 1930152. PMID 17668068.
