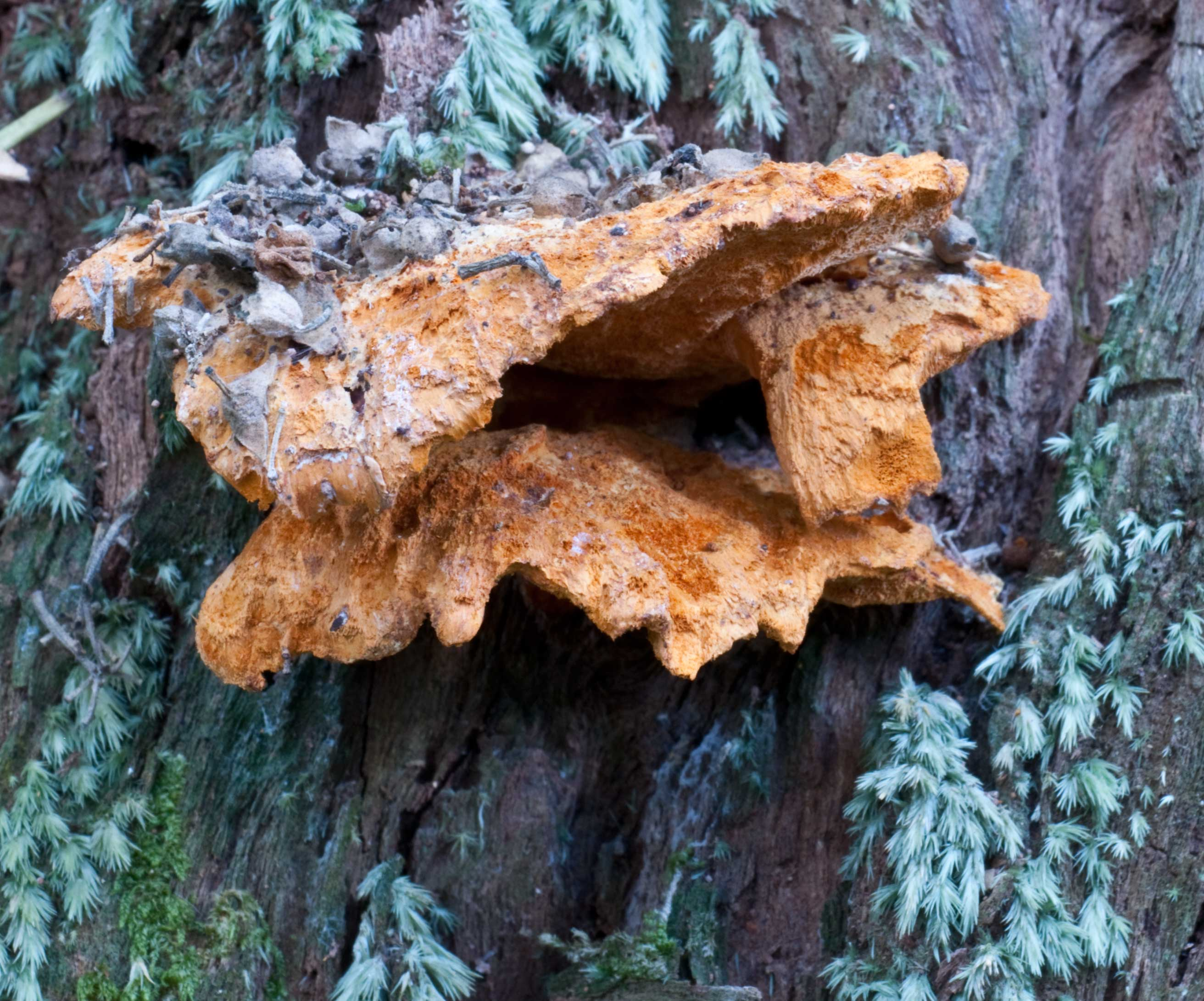

Scientific classification
- Kingdom: Fungi
- Division: Basidiomycota
- Class: Agaricomycetes
- Order: Polyporales
- Family: Fomitopsidaceae
- Genus: Piptoporus
- Species: P. australiensis

Binomial name
- Piptoporus australiensis (Wakef.) G. Cunn.

Synonyms
- Polyporus australiensis Wakef.

= Piptoporus australiensis =

Species of fungus

Piptoporus australiensis
- Mycological characteristics
- Pores on hymenium
- Ecology is parasitic
- Edibility is unknown

Piptoporus australiensis, commonly known as curry punk, is a polyporous bracket fungus. The common name stems from its persistent curry smell which develops with age. The white top of this large, thick bracket becomes stained pale cream to orange by the orange flesh. Deep orange-yellow pores exude copious amounts of saffron-yellow juice.

It is found in Australia, often found on dead eucalypt trees and logs, favouring fire-damaged wood.

== Description ==
The cap is up to 20 centimetres (8 in) wide and 8 cm (3 1/4 in) tall, projecting up to 17 cm (6 1/2 in); it is irregular to semicircular, flat to convex; white then staining yellow, orange to brown; soft but tough, smooth, ridged or pitted, greasy when wet; margin smooth, incurved. There are 1–10 pores per mm; round, angular or irregular; saffron-yellow, aging to orange, rusty-brown; weeps saffron-yellow juice when wet. There is no stem, instead being laterally attached to substrate by a broad base. There is a strong persistent curry smell when old or dry.

Bruce A. Fuhrer describes the species:

Piptoporus australiensis is usually called Curry Punk because of its persistent curry-like odour, even when old and dry. In contrast to other spongy polypores, this species appears to be immune to insect attack. The large brackets occur on logs, particularly those that have been charred by fire, causing a brown cubical rot.
