= Fomitopsis subfeei =

Scientific classification
- Domain: Eukaryota
- Kingdom: Fungi
- Division: Basidiomycota
- Class: Agaricomycetes
- Order: Polyporales
- Family: Fomitopsidaceae
- Genus: Fomitopsis
- Species: F. subfeei

Binomial name
- Fomitopsis subfeei B.K.Cui & M.L.Han (2014)

Species of fungus

Fomitopsis subfeei is a species of polypore fungus in the family Fomitopsidaceae. Found in southern China, it was reported as new to science in 2014 by mycologists Mei-Ling Han and Bao-Kai Cui. Characteristics of the fungus include perennial, effused-reflexed (partially crust-like and partially pileate) to pileate fruit bodies, a concentrically grooved cap surface, and a pinkish-brown to vinaceous-brown pore surface on the cap underside. Microscopic characters include spindle-shaped cystidioles, and small, oblong-ellipsoid spores measuring 4–5 by 1.9–2.5 μm. The fungus causes a brown rot on gymnosperms.
