= Agaric acid =

Names
- IUPAC name 2-Hydroxynonadecane-1,2,3-tricarboxylic acid
- Other names Agaricic acid; Agaricin; 2-Hydroxy-1,2,3-nonadecanetricarboxylic acid

Identifiers
CAS Number	666-99-9
3D model (JSmol)	Interactive image
ChEMBL	ChEMBL78764
ChemSpider	12108
ECHA InfoCard	100.010.516
EC Number	211-566-5
PubChem CID	12629
UNII	2XE342S7L6
CompTox Dashboard (EPA)	DTXSID2046705
- InChI: InChI=1S/C22H40O7/c1-2-3-4-5-6-7-8-9-10-11-12-13-14-15-16-18(20(25)26)22(29,21(27)28)17-19(23)24/h18,29H,2-17H2,1H3,(H,23,24)(H,25,26)(H,27,28) Key: HZLCGUXUOFWCCN-UHFFFAOYSA-N
- SMILES: CCCCCCCCCCCCCCCCC(C(=O)O)C(CC(=O)O)(C(=O)O)O

Properties
Chemical formula	C_{22}H_{40}O_{7}
Molar mass	416.555 g·mol^{−1}
Appearance	Powder
Density	1.115g/cm^{3}
Melting point	138 °C (280 °F; 411 K)
Boiling point	509 °C (948 °F; 782 K) at 760 mmHg
Solubility in water	Insoluble
Acidity (pK_{a})	2.93

Structure
Crystal structure	Microcrystalline
- Except where otherwise noted, data are given for materials in their standard state (at 25 °C [77 °F], 100 kPa). Infobox references

Agaric acid, also known as agaricin or 2-hydroxynonadecane-1,2,3-tricarboxylic acid, is an organic tricarboxylic acid (fatty acid) found in fungi, e.g. Laricifomes officinalis. Its molecular formula is C_{22}H_{40}O_{7}.

== Chemical properties ==
Agaric acid, as any other fatty acid, has an amphipathic character. It means that it has both polar (hydroxyl groups) and nonpolar (hydrocarbon chain) sections, and therefore, it is not completely water-soluble. It is a tribasic acid, and therefore, it can donate up to 3 hydrogen ions to other bases in an acid-base reaction. Other examples of tribasic acids are phosphoric acid or citric acid. It is an odorless and tasteless acid, and we can also distinguish it by its white color. Its melting point at atmospheric pressure is 140 °C.

== Molecular structure ==
Agaric acid is a type of fatty acid that is composed by a long hydrocarbon chain ("tail") and three carboxylic acid groups at one end ("head"). The hydrocarbon chain has sixteen carbons and thirty four hydrogens.

This acid has microcrystalline properties, and therefore, forms small crystals that can not be seen through the naked eye, but are only visible with an optical microscope.

== Functions ==
Agaric acid is used as an inhibitor of metabolism in several animal experiments. It is shown that this acid prevents the formation of C_{2} units from citrate and reduces the availability of citrate for the activation of acetyl-CoA carboxylase. Moreover, it has an important role in the metabolism of lipids, because it influences sterol synthesis.

Agaric acid induces the mitochondrial permeability transition by collaborating with adenine nucleotide translocase. It facilitates the efflux of accumulated Ca^{2+}, disrupts the potential of the membrane and causes mitochondrial lumps. All of these effects bet on membrane fluidity. It is thought that agaric acid activates the opening of membrane pores due to the union of citrate to ADP transporters.

However, a later research showed that N-ethylmaleimide inhibits carboxyatractyloside and agaric acid effects. It was found that this amine restricts the pore opening action of agaric acid, but it does not affect the constraint of ADP exchange by agaric acid.

== Medical use ==
Agaric acid is used in medicine as an anhidrotic agent in order to stop excessive perspiration as it paralyses the nerve terminations in the human body's sweat glands. For example, it helps to avoid tuberculosis patients' frequent night sweats. In addition, when taken in doses from 5 to 15 grams, agaric acid produces vomiting in humans. In the past, agaric acid was used as an irritant, an antidiarrhoeal and a bronchial secretions reducer.

=== Other uses ===
Physicians use agaric acid, but it also can be used in many other subjects such as veterinary and biochemistry. In lower animals, this substance depresses the nervous, respiratory and circulatory systems. It has been used as a metabolic inhibitor at the cellular and subcellular level in scientific animal experiments. Agaric acid has also been used as an alpha-glycerophosphate dehydrogenase inhibitor in Crithidia fasciculata, which is a species of parasitic protist.
