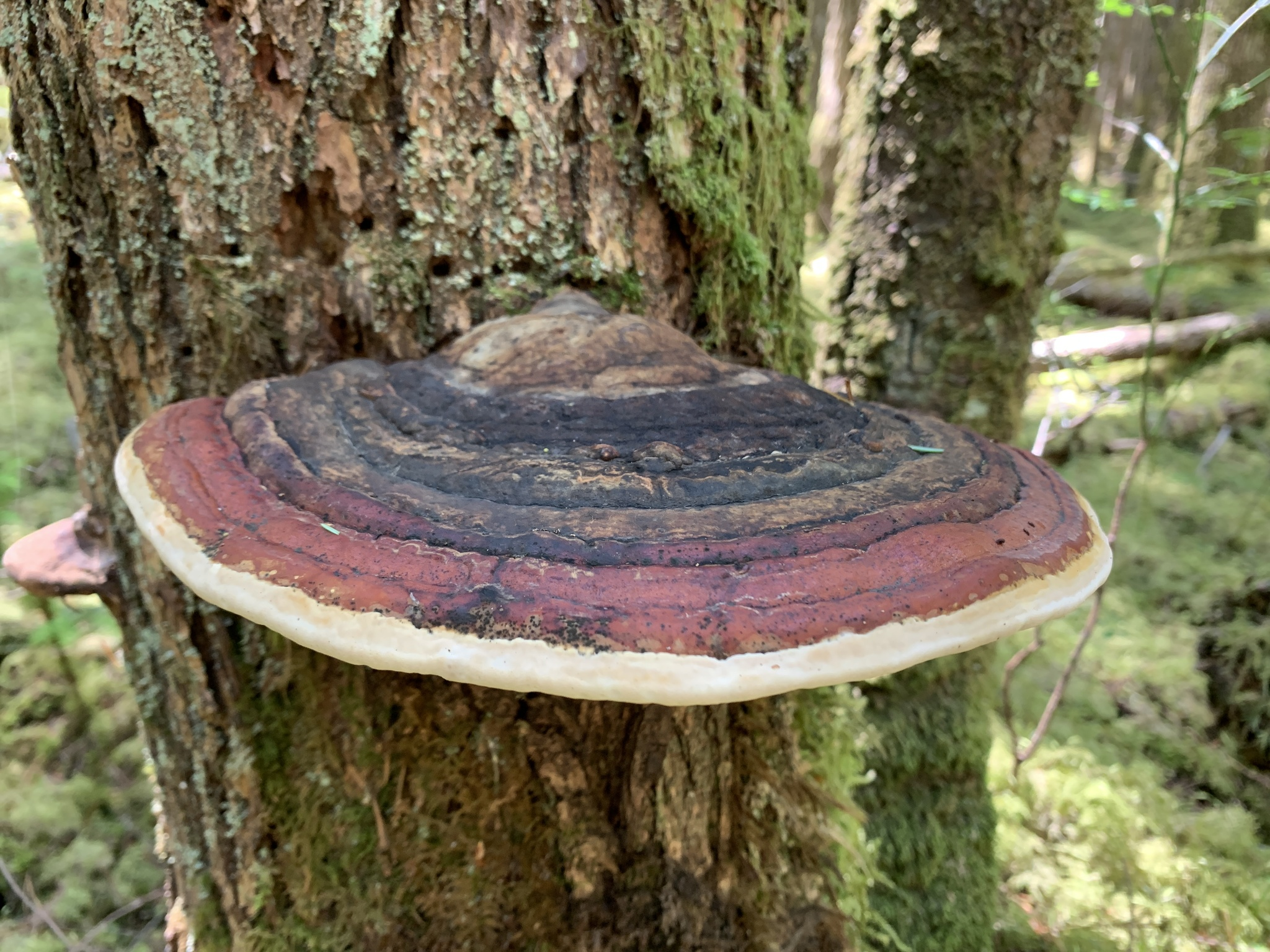

Scientific classification
- Kingdom: Fungi
- Division: Basidiomycota
- Class: Agaricomycetes
- Order: Polyporales
- Family: Fomitopsidaceae
- Genus: Fomitopsis
- Species: F. mounceae

Binomial name
- Fomitopsis mounceae Haight & Nakasone (2019)

= Fomitopsis mounceae =

Species of fungus

Fomitopsis mounceae
- Mycological characteristics
- Pores on hymenium
- No distinct cap
- Hymenium attachment is irregular or not applicable
- Lacks a stipe
- Spore print is white
- Ecology is saprotrophic or parasitic
- Edibility is inedible

Fomitopsis mounceae is a North American species of shelf fungus.

== Taxonomy ==
Originally thought to be identical to the red-belted conk, studies show that it is in fact a discrete species. The original specimen was isolated from Edson, Alberta on a poplar tree. This species was named after Canadian mycologist Irene Mounce.

== Description ==
Fomitopsis mounceae is typically fan-like in shape, with distinct bands usually brown or red in colour. It can have a resinous, sticky coating. As the conks age, they often become bumpy or warty. The cap is 8–25 centimetres (3–10 in) wide and 5–12 cm (2–4 1/2 in) thick at the base.

The underside of the conk is typically white or yellow in colour, with 3–6 round pores per millimetre. If broken open, the inside is yellowish, or sometimes woody and brown, with no distinct bands. It stains brown in KOH.

The spore print is whitish to cream.

=== Similar species ===
Fomitopsis ochracea is very similar but always lacks a red, orange or yellow zone; F. ochracea chars if burnt, while F. mounceae melts. Fomitopsis schrenkii is found in the Southwest, Great Plains, and Rocky Mountains. Ganoderma applanatum usually lacks a blackish zone on the cap and its pores stain dark brown. Species of Fomes are usually taller than wide.

== Habitat and distribution ==
The perennial woody conk causes cubical brown rot typical of Fomitopsis. It favours aspen or conifer trees. It is a detritivore, and does not typically grow on live trees. It typically grows at lower elevations than F. schrenkii.

It is distributed across Canada and the northern United States, as far south as northern California.
