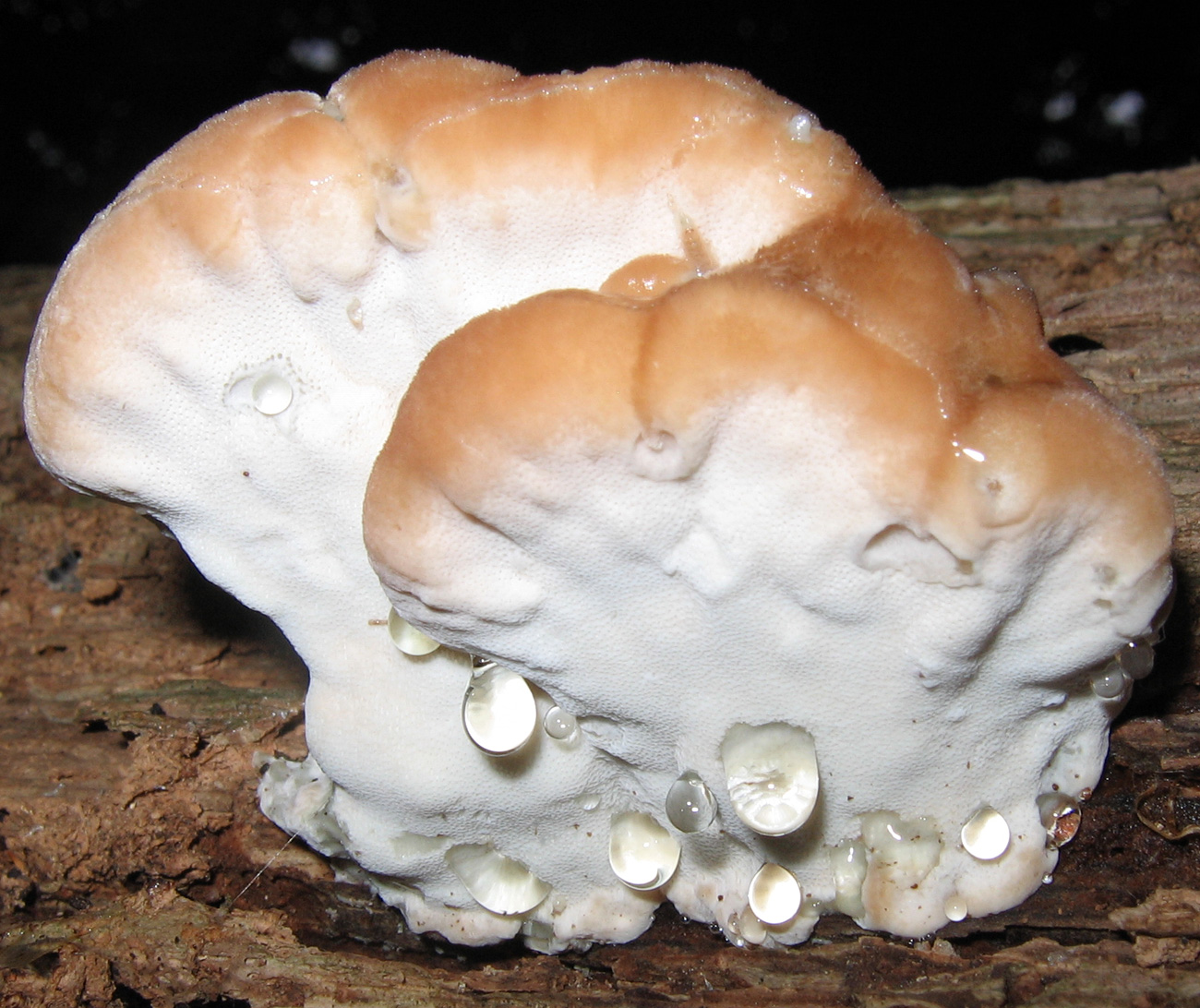

Scientific classification
- Kingdom: Fungi
- Division: Basidiomycota
- Class: Agaricomycetes
- Order: Polyporales
- Family: Fomitopsidaceae
- Genus: Fomitopsis
- Species: F. spraguei

Binomial name
- Fomitopsis spraguei (Berk. & M.A. Curtis) Gilb. & Ryvarden, (1985)

Synonyms
- Pilatoporus spraguei (Berk. & M.A. Curtis) Vampola, (1996); Polyporus sordidus Cooke, (1886); Polyporus spraguei Berk. & M.A. Curtis, (1872); Trametes spraguei (Berk. & M.A. Curtis) Ryvarden, (1980); Tyromyces spraguei (Berk. & M.A. Curtis) Murrill, (1907); Tyromyces subtrimiticus Corner, (1989)

= Fomitopsis spraguei =

Species of fungus

Fomitopsis spraguei is a polypore isolated from Washington and Oregon. It can function as a plant pathogen for Quercus species, or as a detritivore for various hardwood logs.

== Identification ==
F. spraguei is a perennial fungi. It is sessile, meaning it sticks out from the wood, and sometimes curls up on the edges. It can grow to up to 4 cm thick. The top surface can be ivory white to grey, without any bands or rings. It may have matted "hairs" or be smooth, there is some variation within the species. The bottom of the fungus may be white, buff, or pale brown, and may have a pink tint. The inside of the fungus if broken open is tough and corky, coloured white to grey. There are 3-6 round pores per millimetre.

== See also ==
- List of Platanus diseases
- List of sweetgum diseases
