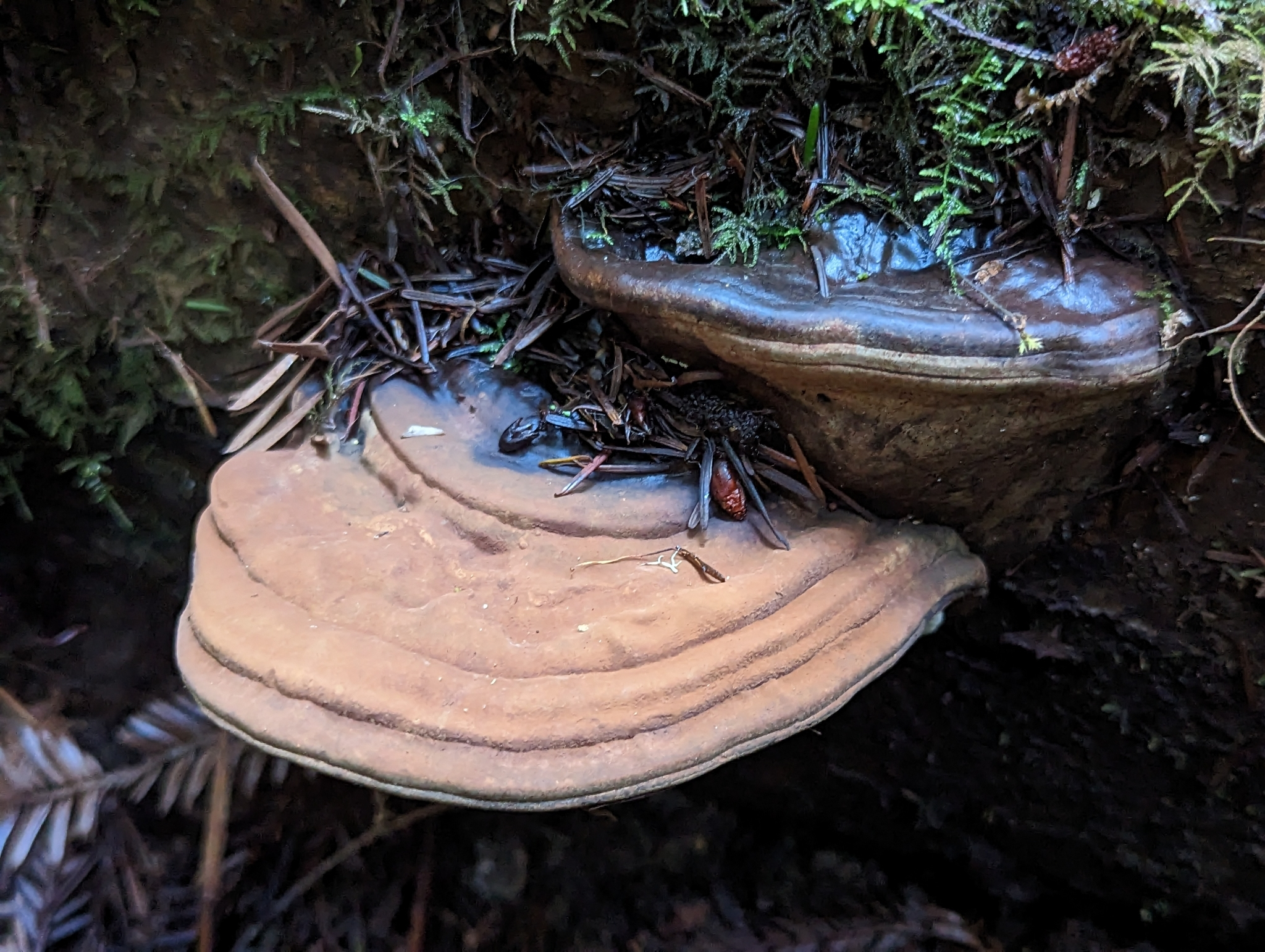
- Mendocino County, California, 2023

Scientific classification
- Domain: Eukaryota
- Kingdom: Fungi
- Division: Basidiomycota
- Class: Agaricomycetes
- Order: Polyporales
- Family: Ganodermataceae
- Genus: Ganoderma
- Species: G. brownii

Binomial name
- Ganoderma brownii (Murrill) Gilb. (1962)

Synonyms
- Elfvingia brownii Murrill (1915); Fomes brownii (Murrill) Murrill (1915); Fomes brownii (Murrill) Sacc. & Trotter (1925)

= Ganoderma brownii =

Species of fungus

Ganoderma brownii is a species of polypore fungus in the Ganodermataceae family. It is a plant pathogen and occasional saprotroph similar in appearance to Ganoderma applanatum. This species is restricted geographically to the Pacific Northwest, primarily observed in California. In the San Francisco Bay Area, it is very common on Umbellularia californica.

== Taxonomy ==
This fungus is a member of the G. applanatum group.

== Description ==
It is a perennial, sessile, concentrically zonate polypore that is 5–65 cm (2.0–25.6 in) in length that can be a number of dull tones ranging from brown to gray. It parasitizes both conifers and hardwoods, with a preference for the latter. Its pore surface is white but easily turns shades of brown upon damage. According to Michael Kuo, it has larger spores than G. applanatum, measuring 9–12 by 7–9 μm.

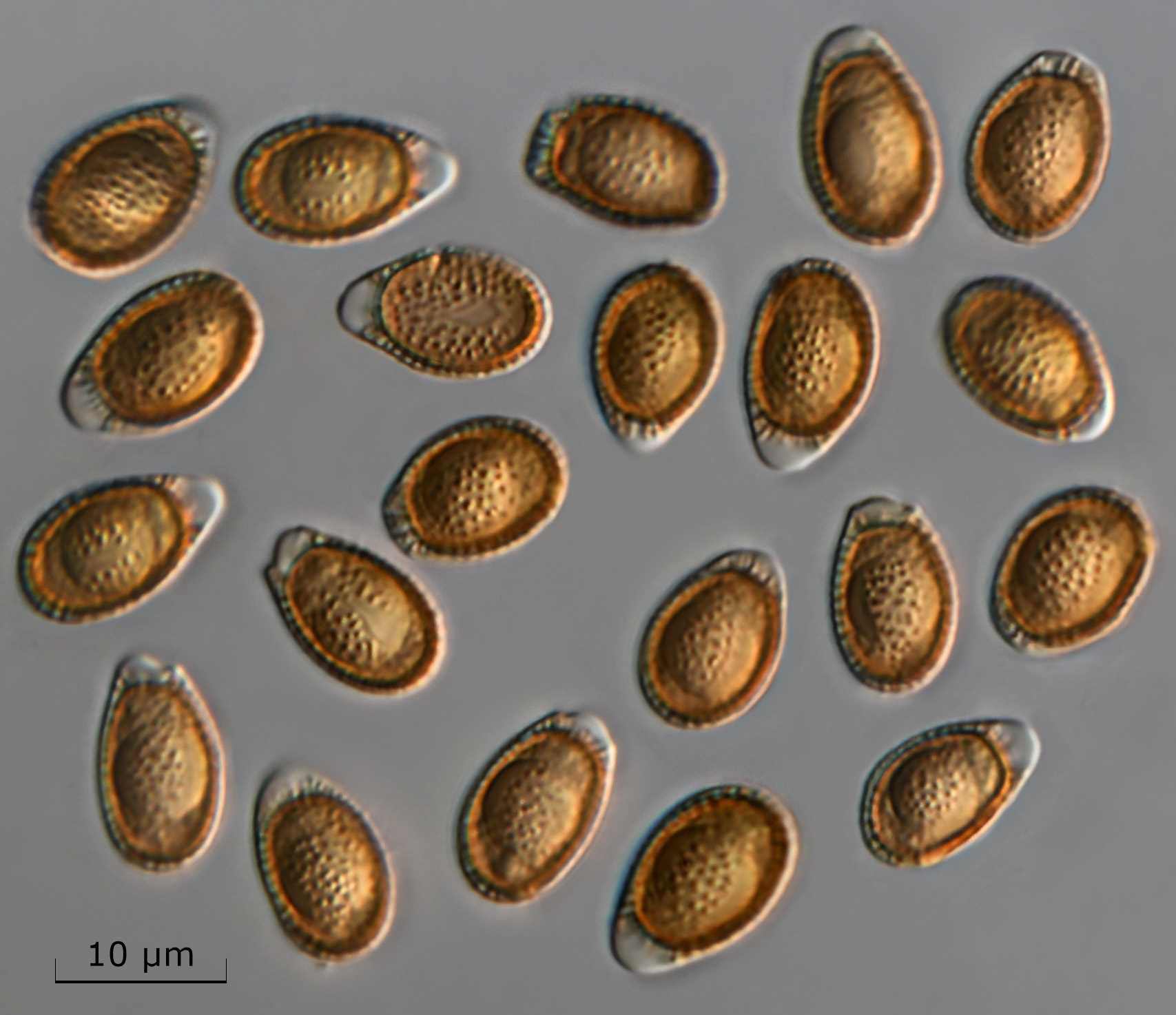
Ganoderma brownii spores 1000x
