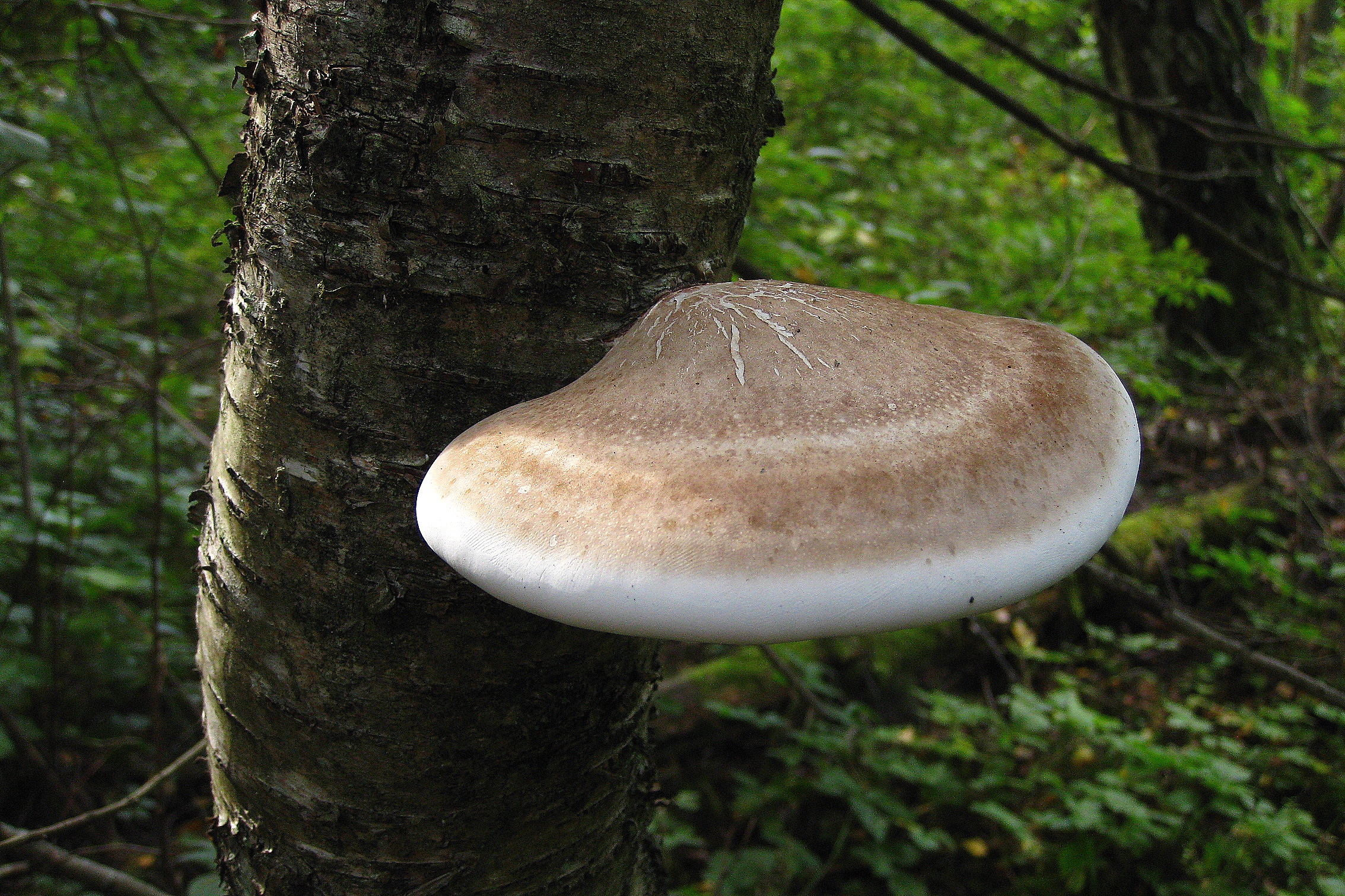
- Piptoporus betulinus

Scientific classification
- Kingdom: Fungi
- Division: Basidiomycota
- Class: Agaricomycetes
- Order: Polyporales
- Family: Fomitopsidaceae
- Genus: Piptoporus; P.Karst (1881)

Type species
- Piptoporus betulinus (Bull.) P.Karst (1787)

Synonyms
- Ungularia Lázaro Ibiza (1917); Placodes sect. Placoderma Ricken (1918); Placoderma (Ricken) Ulbr. (1928)

= Piptoporus =

Genus of fungi

Piptoporus is a genus of bracket fungi in the family Fomitopsidaceae.

Fungi of this genus have been recorded as occasional food of the pleasing fungus beetle Dacne quadrimaculata.

== Species ==
Various species formerly classified as Piptoporus (for example, P. choseniae, P. fraxineus, P. ulmi, P. hirtus, and P. elatinus) have been renamed or moved into other genera.

- Piptoporus australiensis (Wakef.) G. Cunn.
- Piptoporus betulinus (Bull.) P. Karst. (1881)
- Piptoporus quercinus (Schrad.) P. Karst. (1881) (moved to Buglossoporus)
- Piptoporus soloniensis (Dubois) Pilát (1937)
- Piptoporus suberosus (L.) Murrill (1903)
