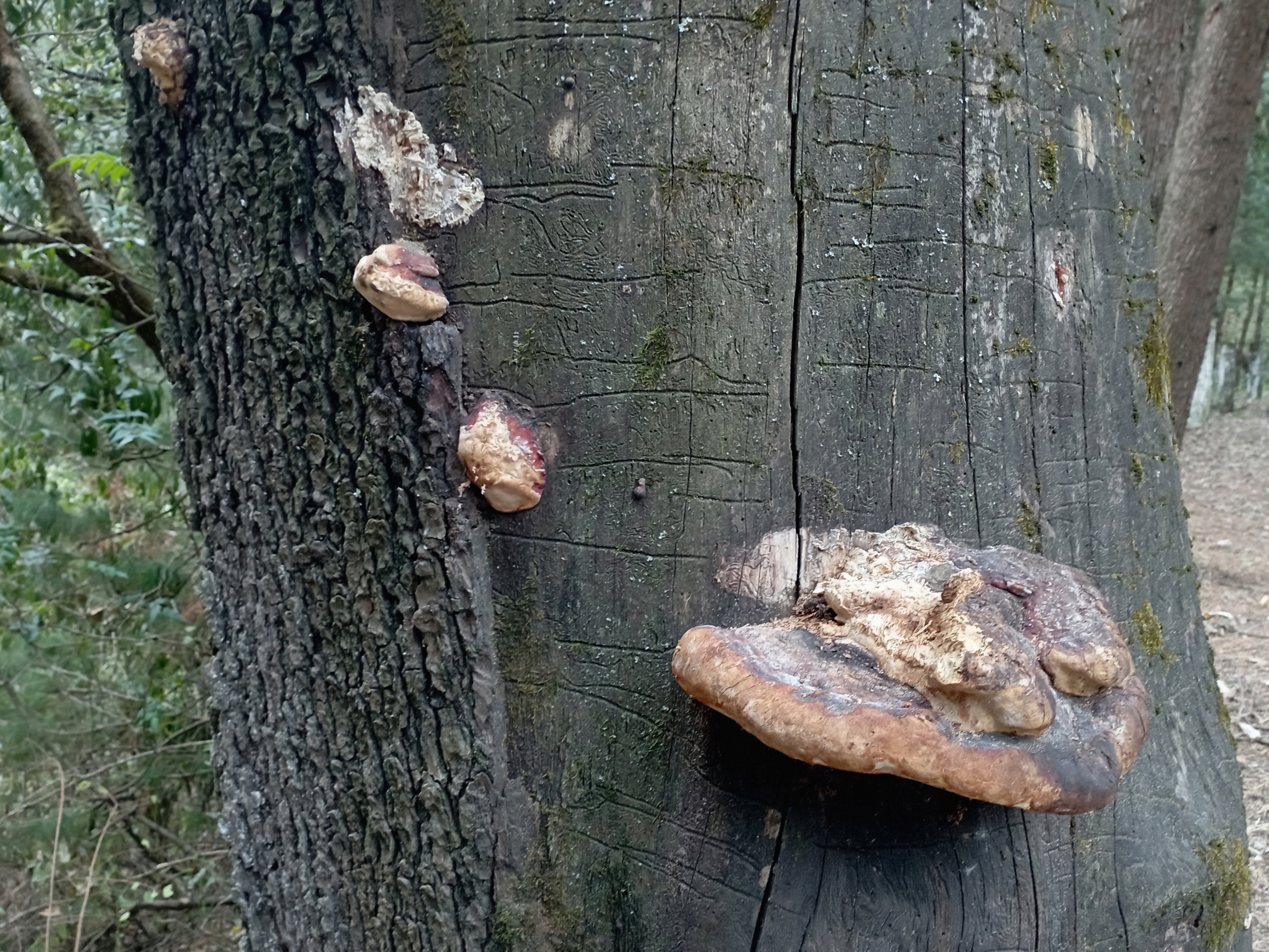

Scientific classification
- Domain: Eukaryota
- Kingdom: Fungi
- Division: Basidiomycota
- Class: Agaricomycetes
- Order: Polyporales
- Family: Fomitopsidaceae
- Genus: Fomitopsis
- Species: F. schrenkii

Binomial name
- Fomitopsis schrenkii Haight & Nakasone

= Fomitopsis schrenkii =

Species of fungus

Fomitopsis schrenkii is a newly isolated species from the genus Fomitopsis. Previously thought to be identical to the red-belted conk, DNA analysis shows it is in fact a distinct species. This species is named after Herman von Schrenk, a respected name in forest pathology. It occurs most frequently in the Southwestern United States, and has a somewhat limited range. It prefers coniferous trees and rarely associates on hardwoods. This substrate preference and location range is most helpful in distinguishing F. schrenkii from its close relative, F. mounceae.

== Description ==
Fomitopsis schrenkii is a perennial, woody conk with a fan-like shape. The surface is smooth and can be resinous, and usually ends with a bumpy margin. The colour usually follows a set pattern- at base a whiteish orange, then darkening to a true orange or brown, then lightening to a creamy-white at the margins. Older specimens will darken to a grey or brown colour, with bands less visible but still distinct. If broken open, the woody context of the conk is a light yellow or tan colour, with no distinct bands. The underside of the conk is a light yellow or white colour, with 3-4 round pores per millimetre. This species stains reddish or light brown in KOH.
