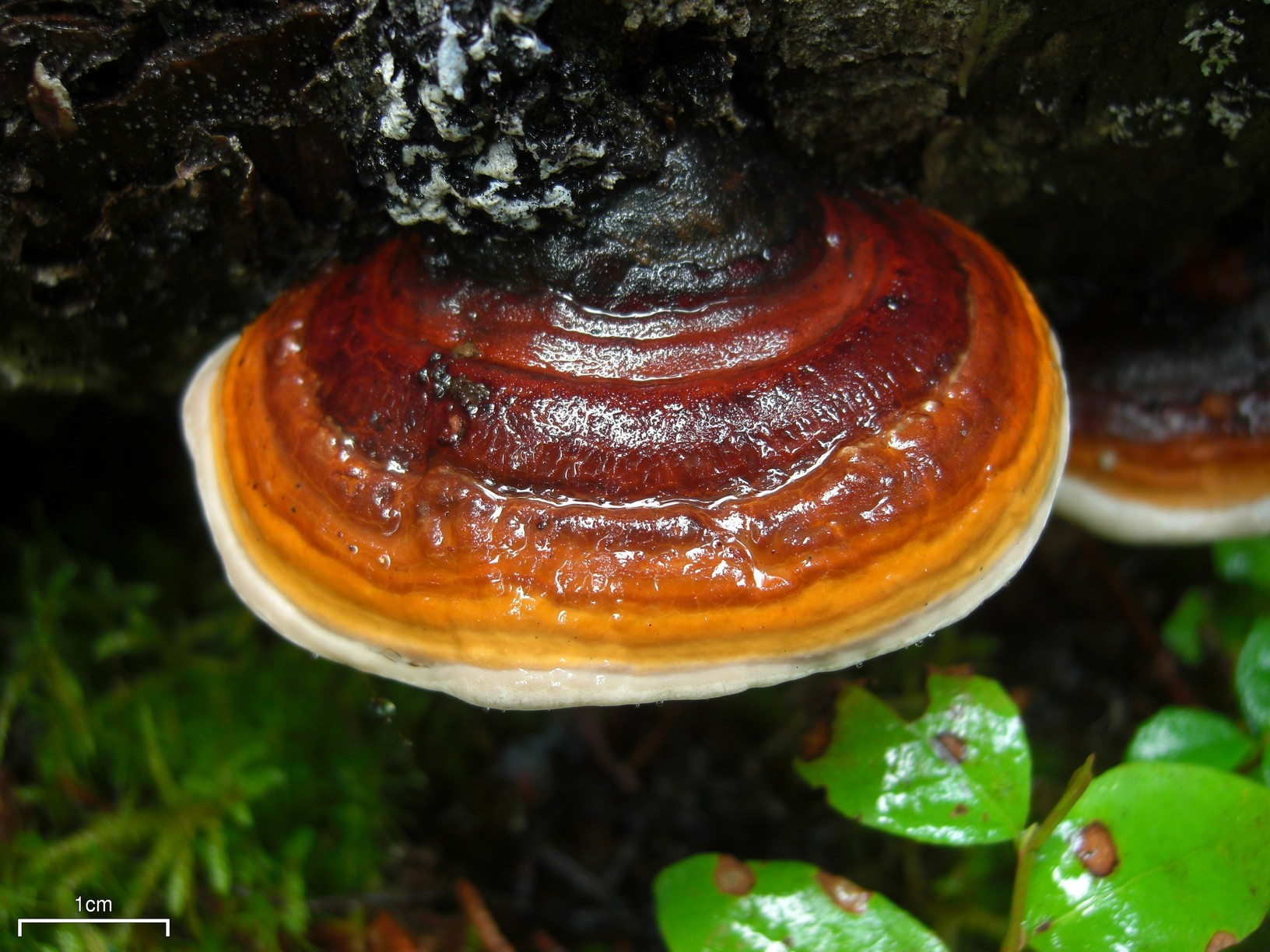

Scientific classification
- Kingdom: Fungi
- Division: Basidiomycota
- Class: Agaricomycetes
- Order: Polyporales
- Family: Fomitopsidaceae
- Genus: Fomitopsis
- Species: F. pinicola

Binomial name
- Fomitopsis pinicola (Sw.) P.Karst. (1881)

Synonyms
- Boletus pinicola Sw. (1810)

= Fomitopsis pinicola =

Stem decay fungus

Fomitopsis pinicola
- Mycological characteristics
- Pores on hymenium
- No distinct cap
- Hymenium is decurrent
- Lacks a stipe
- Spore print is yellow
- Ecology is saprotrophic
- Edibility is inedible

Fomitopsis pinicola, is a stem-decay fungus. Its conk (fruit body) is known as the red-belted conk or red-belted bracket. The species is common throughout temperate Eurasia. It is a decay fungus that serves as a small-scale disturbance agent in coastal rainforest ecosystems. It influences stand structure and succession in temperate rainforests. It performs essential nutrient cycling functions in forests. It is also a key producer of brown rot residues that are stable soil components in coniferous forest ecosystems.

== Taxonomy ==
There is currently a splitting of F. pinicola occurring to isolate distinct species that have all previously been classified as F. pinicola. DNA analysis supports splitting F. pinicola into three groups- F. pinicola, F. mounceae, and F. schrenkii. Fomitopsis pinicola is found in Europe and Asia, F. mounceae is on the east coast of the US, west coast of the US and midwestern US, and F. schrenkii is found at higher elevations in the latitude of the Rocky Mountains, from Canada to central Mexico.

== Description ==
The cap is hoof-shaped or triangular, and sometimes shelflike. It is hard and tough, and up to 30 cm or more across and 15 cm thick. Its surface is more or less smooth, at first orange-yellow with a white margin, later dark reddish to brown and then frequently with an orange margin. The pore surface is pale yellow to leather-brown, 3–4 pores per mm. It grows as thick shelves on live and dead coniferous or (less commonly) deciduous trees. The spores are pale yellow and smooth. The species also grows as a layer of tubes on the bottom of fallen wood.

The fruiting body of F. pinicola is called the conk. It is a woody, pileate fruiting body with pores lined with basidia on its underside. As in other polypores, the fruiting body is perennial with a new layer of pores produced each year on the bottom of the old pores. The pores are whitish when young and become somewhat brownish in age.

=== Similar species ===
Similar species include Ganoderma lucidum, Laricifomes officinalis, and Heterobasidion annosum.

== Distribution, habitat and ecology ==
The species is common throughout temperate Eurasia. It is common on softwood and hardwood trees.

This stem decay fungus is found on live conifer trees in southeast Alaska such as Western hemlock, Mountain hemlock, White spruce, Lutz spruce and Sitka spruce. The tree stem decay is caused by the fungus when it invades and colonizes the wood of living trees and decomposes the wood before the tree is dead. This brown rot fungus degrades only cellulose, leaving the other primary constituents of wood, lignin, as a considerably less dense but fairly stable residual structure that is suitable for excavation by woodpeckers.

This fungus is normally found on dead pines, but can be found on all conifers. It can also be observed growing on large stem wounds, broken tops, and dead tissue of live trees. In mature forests, these stem decay fungi cause enormous annual wood volume loss of Alaska's major tree species. Approximately one-third of the old-growth timber board-foot volume in Southeast Alaska is defective, largely due to decay from this type of fungus. Conversely, there is very little decay in young-growth stands without prevalent wounding from commercial thinning activities, wind damage, or animal feeding. By predisposing large old trees to bole breakage and windthrow, stem decays serve as important small-scale disturbance regimes in these temperate rainforest ecosystems where fire and other large-scale disturbances are uncommon.

This stem decay creates canopy gaps, influences stand structure and succession, increases biodiversity, and enhances wildlife habitat. The fungus also performs essential nutrient cycling functions in these forests by decomposing stems, branches, roots, and boles of dead trees. Cavities created by the fungus in standing trees provide crucial habitat for many wildlife species including bears, voles, squirrels, and a number of bird species. The lack of disturbance in these areas and longevity of individual trees allows ample time for this slow-growing decay fungus to cause significant decay. There is a growing interest in acquiring methods to promote earlier development of stem decays in second-growth stands to achieve wildlife and other non-timber objectives.

=== Stem decay characteristics ===
Most of the stem decay (heart rot) in mature forests that results from this fungus does not interfere with the normal growth and physiological processes of live trees since the vascular tissue is not affected. It is classified as a brown rot, which primarily degrades cellulose in tree stands. The early stage of wood decay appears as yellowish to brownish discoloration with the advanced stage appearing as a brown and crumbly breaking into cubical pieces. Wood impacted by this fungus may become more brittle and prone to breakage in high winds, and cannot be used for pulp production. This species requires exposed wood of wounds for entry, continuing their decay after the tree dies. On dead trees, the fungus general affects the sapwood and then progresses into heartwood.

The fruiting bodies of the fungus produce abundant basidiocarps and basidiospores which are generally dispersed in air currents and germinate upon contact with wood or other substrates, but the actual degradation of the wood is by the thread-like vegetative part of the fungus inside the trees. The fungus can occur anywhere on roots or the stem, but is most common low on the bole, where frequent wounds promote infection.

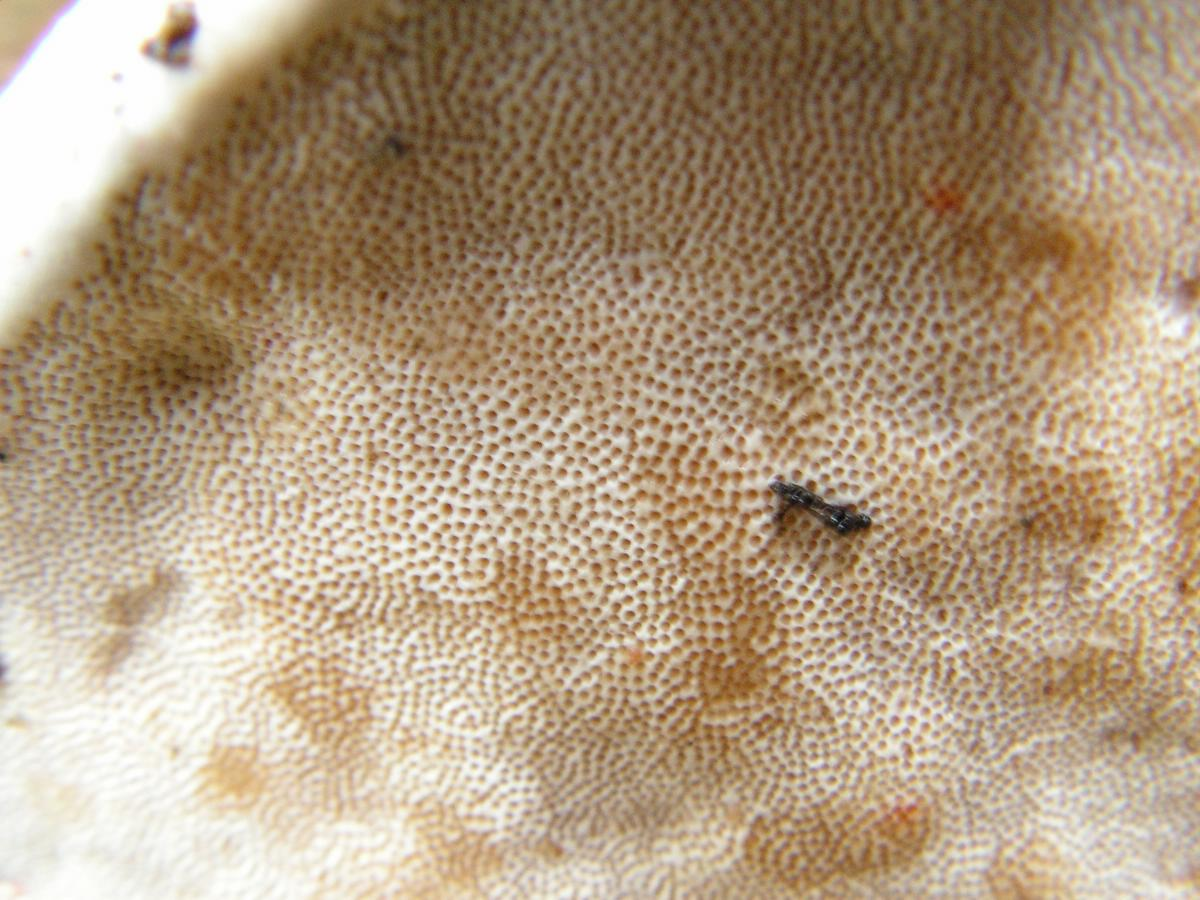
Underside of conk showing the typical round pores.

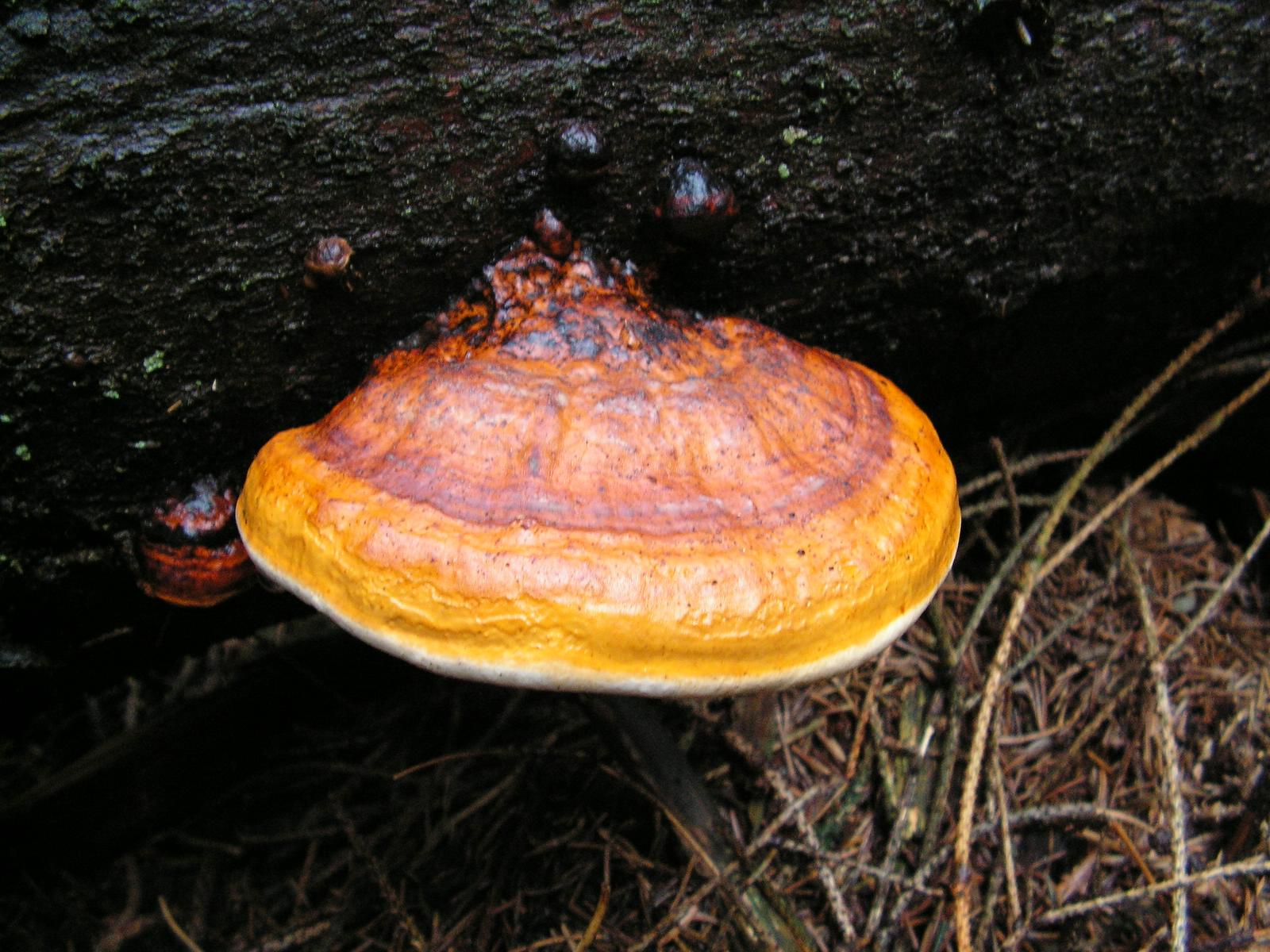
Younger specimens like these often show more orange colours.

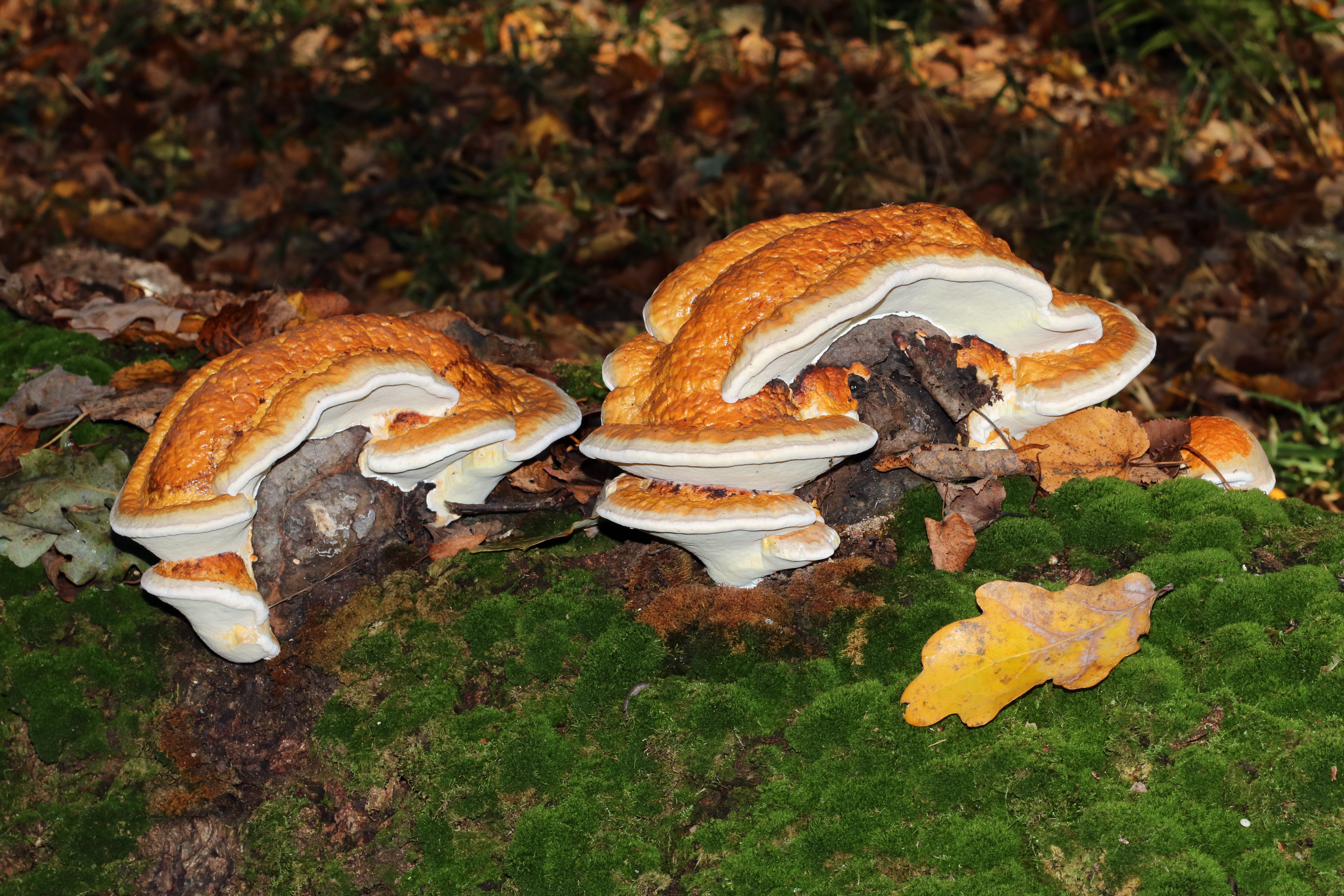
Fomitopsis pinicola on a dead tree in Ukraine.

== Potential uses ==
This mushroom is inedible due to its woody texture, but it is useful as tinder. It can potentially be prepared as a famine food through a laborious process.

The basidiocarps of the fungus have been reported to have medicinal uses in Asia. It has been reported that mushrooms have significant antioxidant activity.
