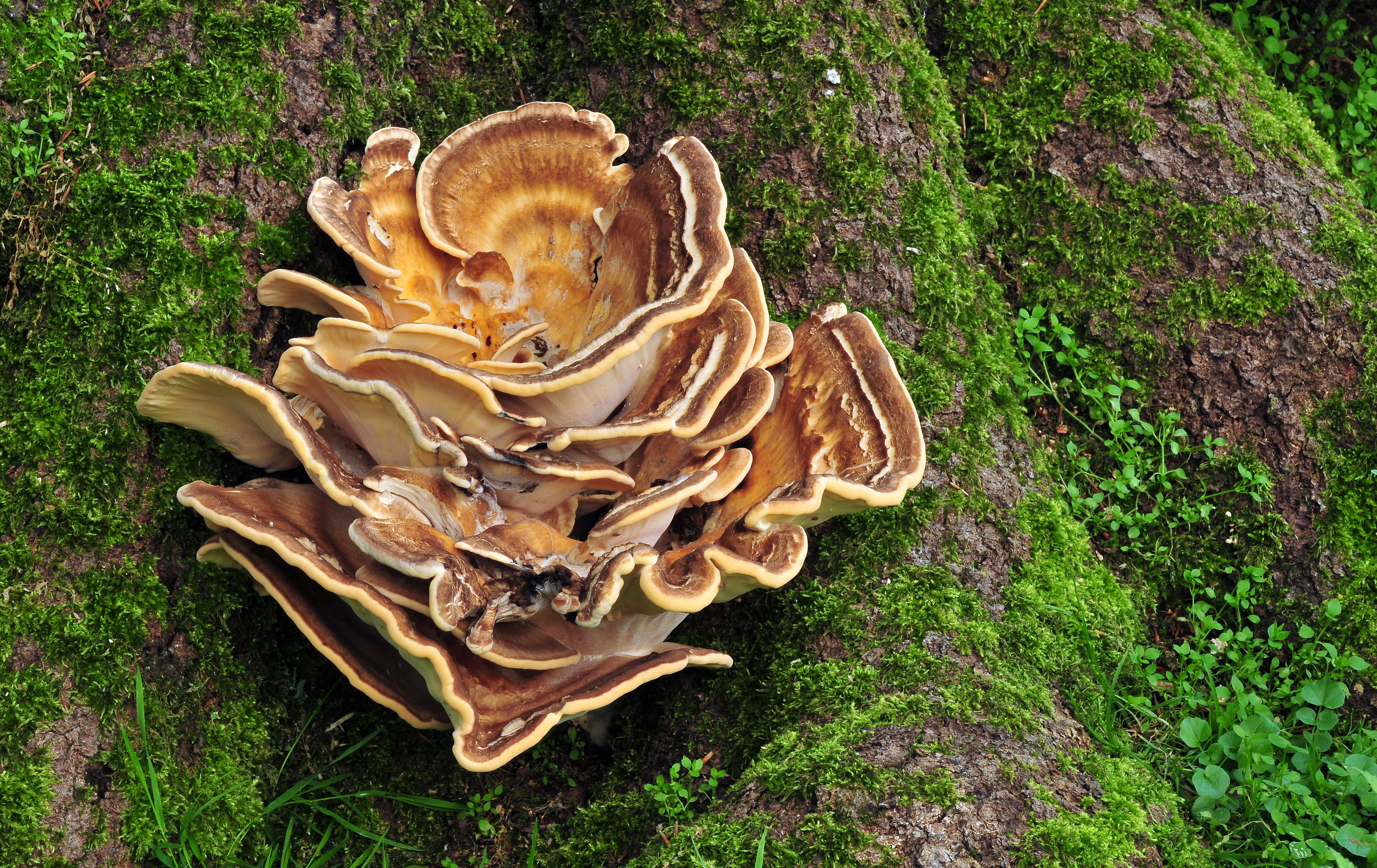

Scientific classification
- Kingdom: Fungi
- Division: Basidiomycota
- Class: Agaricomycetes
- Order: Polyporales
- Family: Meripilaceae
- Genus: Meripilus
- Species: M. giganteus

Binomial name
- Meripilus giganteus (Pers.) Karst. (1882)

Synonyms
- Boletus giganteus Pers. (1794)

= Meripilus giganteus =

Meripilus giganteus
- Mycological characteristics
- Pores on hymenium
- Cap is offset or indistinct
- Hymenium is decurrent
- Lacks a stipe
- Spore print is white
- Ecology is saprotrophic
- Edibility is edible

Meripilus giganteus is a polypore fungus in the family Meripilaceae. It causes a white rot in various types of broadleaved trees, particularly beech (Fagus), but also Abies, Picea, Pinus, Quercus and Ulmus species. This bracket fungus, commonly known as the giant polypore or black-staining polypore, is often found in large clumps at the base of trees, although fruiting bodies are sometimes found some distance away from the trunk, parasitizing the roots. M. giganteus has a circumboreal distribution in the northern Hemisphere, and is widely distributed in Europe. In the field, it is recognizable by the large, multi-capped fruiting body, as well as its pore surface that quickly darkens black when bruised or injured.

== Description ==
The basidiocarps consist of numerous rosette-like flattened fan-shaped pilei; they are typically 50–150 centimetres (20–59 in), rarely 250 centimetres (98 in) in diameter and 10–50 centimetres (3.9–19.7 in), rarely 90 centimetres (35 in) high. The individual caps, up to 10–50 centimetres (3.9–19.7 in), rarely 90 centimetres (35 in) in diameter and 1–5 centimetres (0.39–1.97 in) thick, arise from a common basal stem.

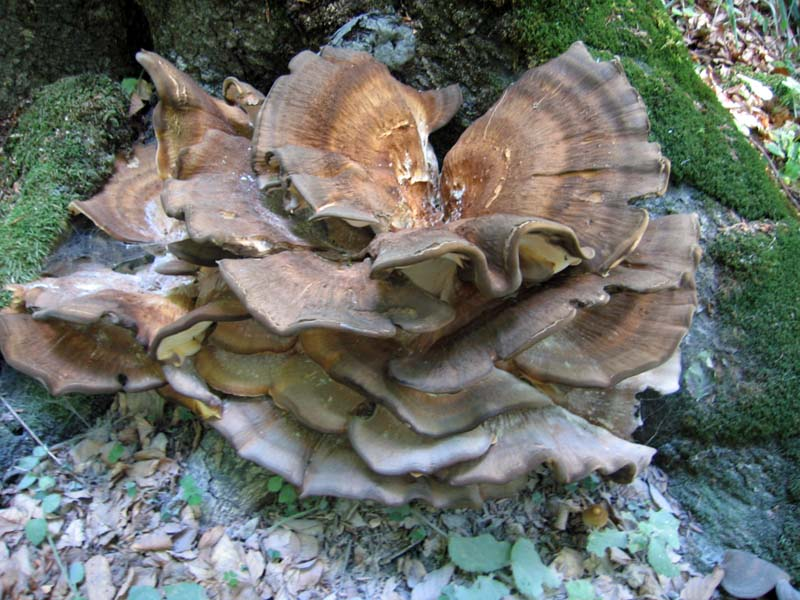
An older specimen of M. giganteus with brown, zonate pilei.

The weight is 10–50 kilograms (22–110 lb), but the heaviest specimen can reach 90 kilograms (200 lb).

The color of the cap surface is pale tan to dull chestnut brown in young specimens but darkens in age to become concentric zones (zonate) of various shades of brown.

The surface is also finely fibrillose with tiny scales (squamules). There are 3 to 6 pores per millimeter on the underside; the pore surface bruises brown and black, helping to distinguish it from the similar species Grifola frondosa. The fruiting body appears in autumn but does not persist and collapses into a slimy black mass after the first frosts of the year.

Infection of a tree is often through a dead tap root, and decay is largely restricted to roots, and then mainly on the underside. Infected trees often show thinning of the outer crown due to impaired root function. Whole tree failure is due to brittle fracture of degraded lateral roots. The fungus carries on fructifying on stumps or in surface roots for some years after the felling of infected hosts.

Microscopic features

Spores are roughly spherical to ovoid or ellipsoid in shape, with typical dimensions of 6–6.5 × 5.5–6 μm. Under a microscope, they appear translucent (hyaline), smooth, and nonamyloid, meaning that they do not absorb stain from Melzer's reagent. The basidia—the spore-bearing cells—are club-shaped, 4-spored, and are 22–40 by 7–8 μm.

Polypore fungi may be further distinguished by the type of hyphae that makes up their fruiting body. M. giganteus has a so-called monomitic hyphal system, as its fruiting body is composed of only vegetative hyphae.

== Edibility ==
The giant polypore was previously considered inedible, due to its very coarse flesh and mildly acidic taste, but more recent sources list it as edible. Younger specimens may be more palatable; one author notes that it is "eaten in Japan". Also, it may be mistakenly consumed because of its resemblance with the edible species commonly known as Hen of the Woods (Grifola frondosa) which is regarded as much better tasting.

== Distribution and ecology ==
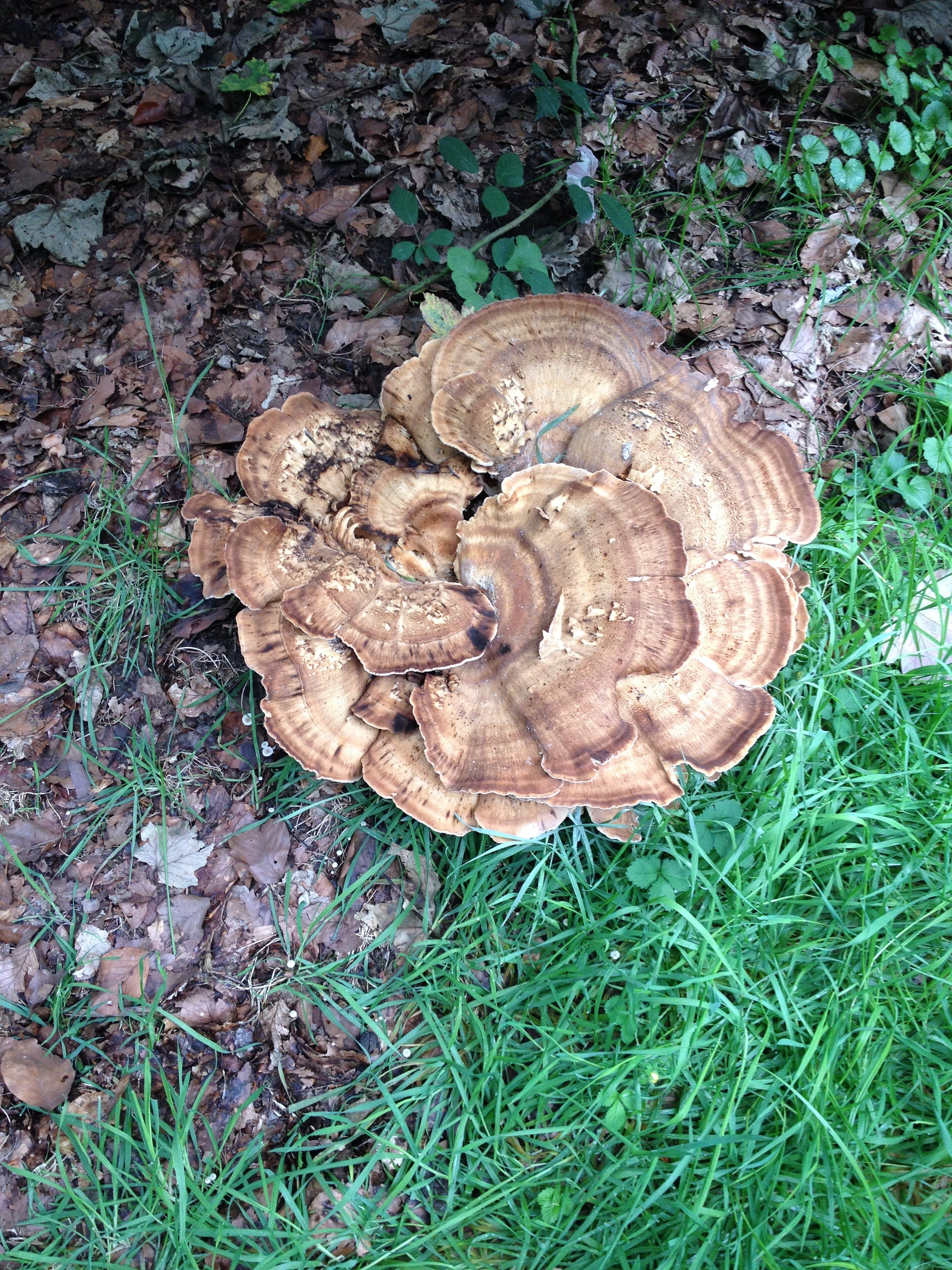
Although usually found on tree trunks, it is not uncommon to find it away from the tree

M. giganteus has a circumboreal distribution in the northern hemisphere. It has been collected from Europe, Scandinavia, the area formerly known as the USSR, Iran and Turkey. Although many field guides list it as occurring in North America, this is due to confusion with the related M. sumstinei; M. giganteus is not found in North America. A study of the frequency of occurrence of wood-decay fungi on street trees and park trees in Hamburg, Germany found that M. giganteus was the most common species.

This mushroom can be found growing on hardwoods, more rarely on conifers. According to Ryvarden and Gilbertson in their monograph on the polypores of Europe, M. giganteus grows especially on Quercus and Fagus tree species, but it has also been collected on the hardwoods Acer, Aesculus, Alnus, Betula, Castanea, Celtis, Corylus, Eucalyptus, Laurus, Myrica, Persea, Pittosporum, Platanus, Populus, Prunus, Pyrus, Tilia, Ulmus; it has also been found growing on the coniferous species Abies, Larix, and Pinus.

Adults of the pleasing fungus beetle Tritoma atriventris have been recorded from this fungus, but it does not seem to be a regular food source for them.

== Similar species ==
The polypore fungus Grifola frondosa is similar in overall appearance, but may be distinguished by its more greyish cap, and larger pores. Bondarzewia berkeleyi or "Berkeley's polypore" is often confused with M. giganteus (or M. sumstinei) in eastern North America but can be distinguished by its lack of black-bruising and much larger pores.
