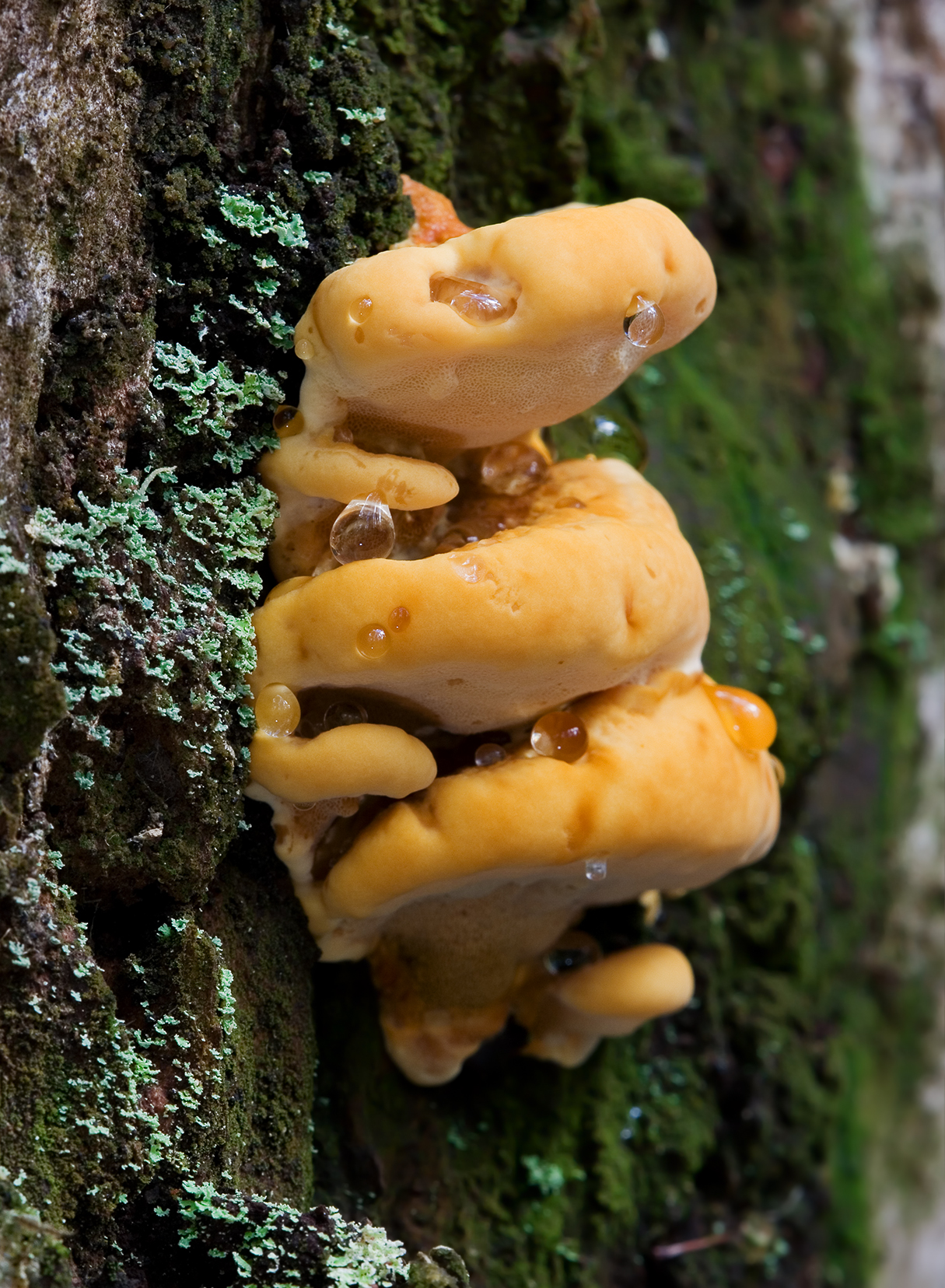

Scientific classification
- Domain: Eukaryota
- Kingdom: Fungi
- Division: Basidiomycota
- Class: Agaricomycetes
- Order: Polyporales
- Family: Meripilaceae
- Genus: Rigidoporus
- Species: R. laetus

Binomial name
- Rigidoporus laetus (Cooke) P.K.Buchanan & Ryvarden (1988)

Synonyms
- Polyporus laetus Cooke (1883); Fomes laetus (Cooke) Lloyd (1915); Coltricia laeta (Cooke) G.Cunn. (1948)

= Rigidoporus laetus =

Species of fungus

Rigidoporus laetus is a species of polypore fungus in the family Meripilaceae. It was originally described in 1883 as Polyporus laetus by Mordecai Cubitt Cooke. Peter Buchanan and Leif Ryvarden transferred it to Rigidoporus in 1988. Found in south Australia, the fungus is a plant pathogen that causes white rot in Eucalyptus.
