= Physisporinus yunnanensis =

Scientific classification
- Domain: Eukaryota
- Kingdom: Fungi
- Division: Basidiomycota
- Class: Agaricomycetes
- Order: Polyporales
- Family: Meripilaceae
- Genus: Physisporinus
- Species: P. yunnanensis

Binomial name
- Physisporinus yunnanensis Cai (2023)

Species of fungus

Physisporinus yunnanensis is a species of fungus belonging to the basidiomycetes, in the family Meripilaceae. It was described in early 2023 by Jia Cai. The species was found in Yunnan, China. It is a white rot fungus which forms bone-hard fruiting bodies which bear the basidia.
