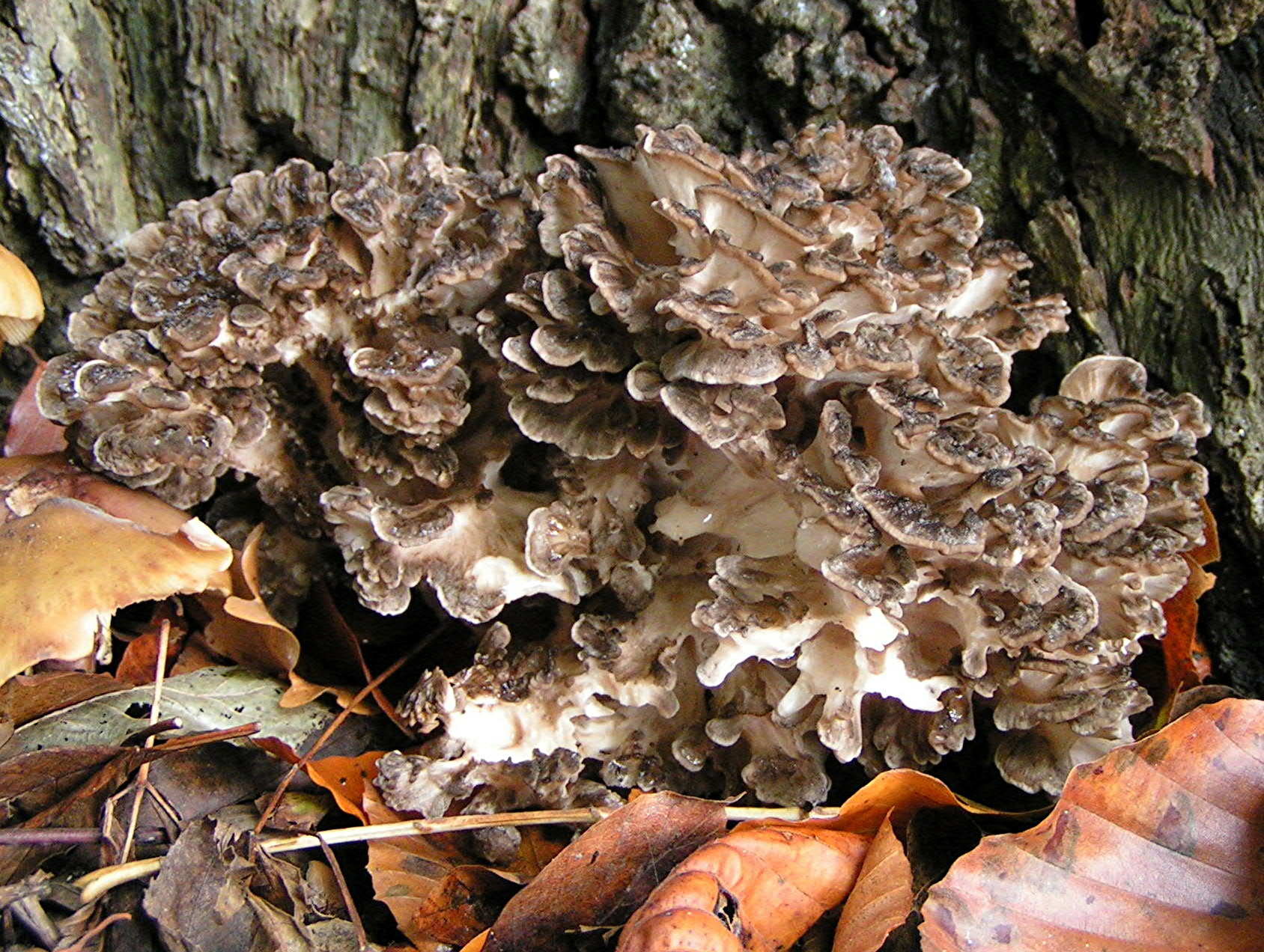
- Grifola frondosa

Scientific classification
- Kingdom: Fungi
- Division: Basidiomycota
- Class: Agaricomycetes
- Order: Polyporales
- Family: Meripilaceae
- Genus: Grifola; Gray (1821)

Type species
- Grifola frondosa (Dicks.) Gray (1821)

Species
- G. acanthoides; G. amazonica; G. armeniaca; G. colensoi; G. frondosa; G. gargal; G. platypora; G. rosularis; G. sordulenta

Synonyms
- Polyporus trF. Merisma Fr. (1821); Polypilus P.Karst. (1881); Cladodendron Lázaro Ibiza (1917); Cautinia Maas Geest. (1967)

= Grifola =

Genus of fungi

Grifola is a genus of fungi in the family Grifolaceae, which includes some edible fungi such as Grifola frondosa, commonly known as hen-of-the-woods (or maitake in Japan); not to be confused with Laetiporus sulphureus, known among English speakers as chicken of the woods. The genus was circumscribed by Samuel Frederick Gray in 1821.
