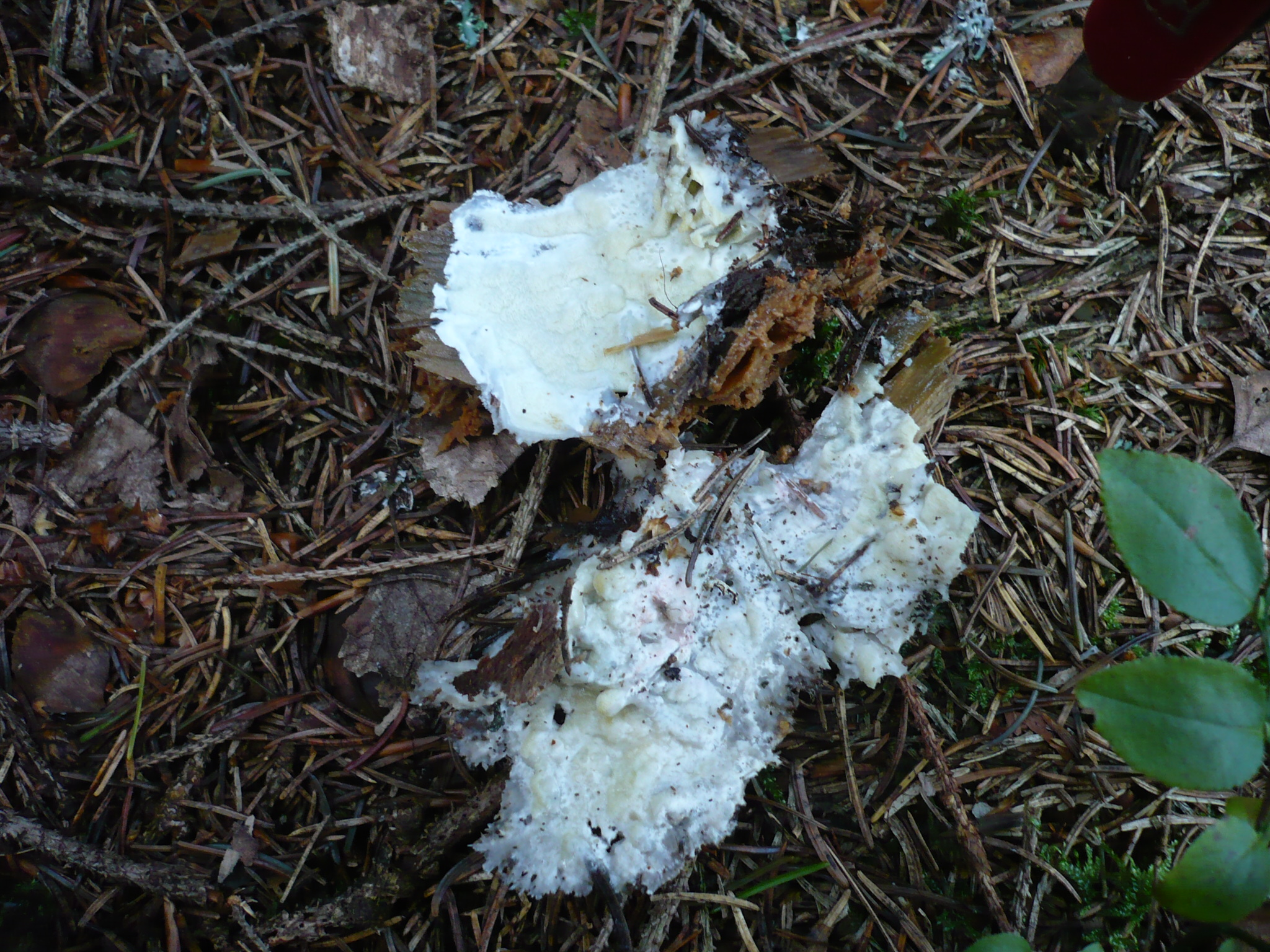

Scientific classification
- Domain: Eukaryota
- Kingdom: Fungi
- Division: Basidiomycota
- Class: Agaricomycetes
- Order: Polyporales
- Family: Meripilaceae
- Genus: Physisporinus
- Species: P. vitreus

Binomial name
- Physisporinus vitreus (Pers.) P.Karst. (1889)

Synonyms
- Poria vitrea Pers. (1796)

= Physisporinus vitreus =

Species of fungus

Physisporinus vitreus is a species of crust fungus in the family Meripilaceae, and the type species of the genus Physisporinus. It was originally described by Christian Hendrik Persoon by 1796. Petter Adolf Karsten transferred it to the genus Physisporinus in 1889.
