= Henningsia =

Scientific classification
- Kingdom: Fungi
- Division: Basidiomycota
- Class: Agaricomycetes
- Order: Polyporales
- Family: Meripilaceae
- Genus: Henningsia; A.Møller (1895)

Type species
- Henningsia geminella A.Möller (1895)

Species
- H. ater H. brasiliensis H. caespitosa H. galapagensis H. macrospora

Genus of fungi

Henningsia is a fungal genus in the family Meripilaceae. The genus was circumscribed in 1895 by Alfred Möller with Henningsia geminella as the type; this species is now known as H. brasiliensis. The generic name honours German mycologist Paul Christoph Hennings.
