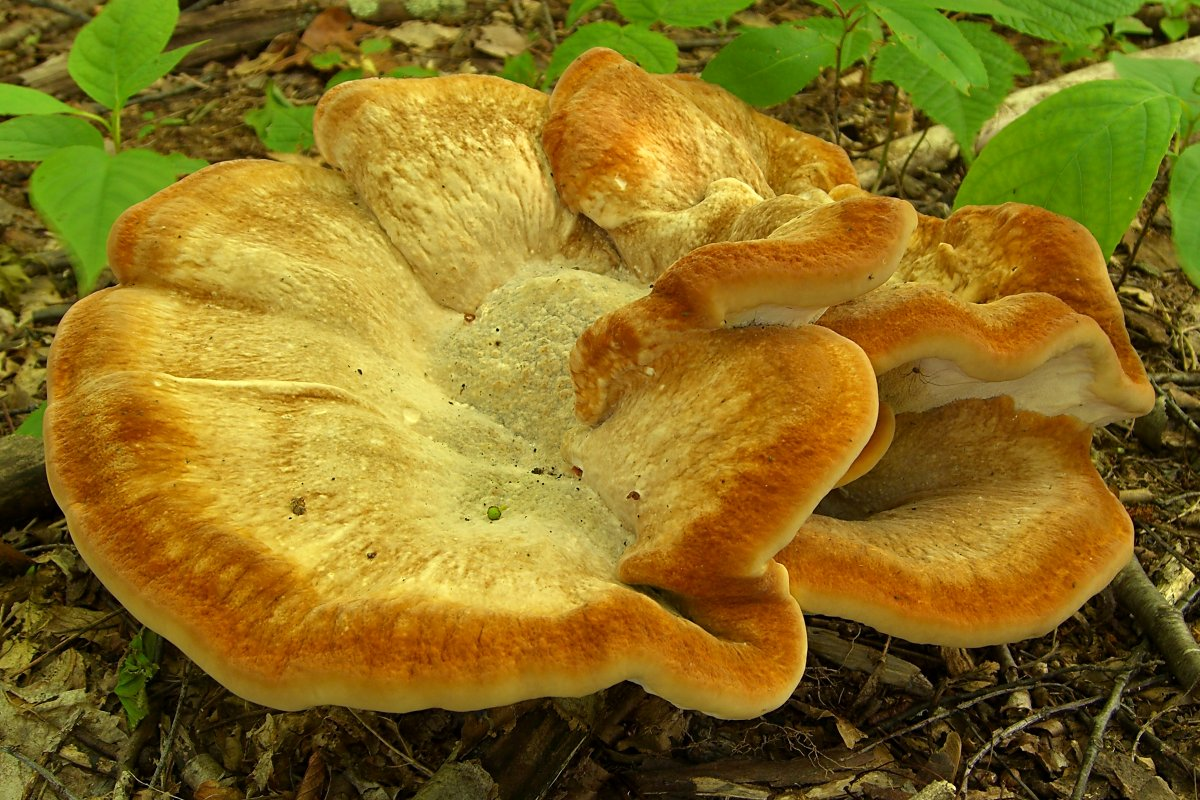

Scientific classification
- Kingdom: Fungi
- Division: Basidiomycota
- Class: Agaricomycetes
- Order: Russulales
- Family: Bondarzewiaceae
- Genus: Bondarzewia
- Species: B. berkeleyi

Binomial name
- Bondarzewia berkeleyi (Fr.) Bondartsev & Singer (1941)

Synonyms
- Polyporus berkeleyi Fr. (1851)

= Bondarzewia berkeleyi =

Species of fungus

Bondarzewia berkeleyi, commonly known as Berkeley's polypore, or stump blossoms, is a species of polypore fungus in the family Bondarzewiaceae. It is a parasitic species that causes butt rot in oaks and other hardwood trees. A widespread fungus, it is found in the Old World and North America.

== Taxonomy ==
Elias Magnus Fries described the species as Polyporus berkeleyi in 1851. It was moved to the genus Bondarzewia in 1941.

== Description ==
The fan- or shelf-shaped caps grow in overlapping clumps from the bases of trees, each growing to 20–50 centimetres (8–19 1/2 in) diameter. They are zoned in various shades of white to pale grey, cream, beige or yellow. The pore surface is white, as is the spore print. The round spores are 7–9 by 6–8 μm and have marked amyloid ridges. The tough white flesh can be up to 3 cm (1 1/4 in) thick and has a mild taste, becoming bitter with age. The outer edges that cut easily with a knife are quite tender.

=== Similar species ===
Potential lookalikes include B. occidentalis, Grifola frondosa, Meripilus sumstinei, and Vanderbylia spp.

== Distribution and habitat ==
The distribution of B. berkeleyi is widespread, occurring in Europe, Asia, Africa, and North America east of the Great Plains (June–October). While its primary host is oak, it has also been observed on other hardwood species such as maple.

In China it has been recorded from Guangdong and Hunan provinces. The fruit bodies appear over July to October in the United States. A survey of host trees in North Carolina found that it almost always grew on oaks, being recorded from the white oak (Quercus alba), scarlet oak (Q. coccinea), southern red oak (Q. falcata), chestnut oak (Q. prinus) and eastern black oak (Q. velutina), as well as bird cherry (Prunus pensylvanica).

== Ecology ==
Bondarzewia berkeleyi is a parasitic fungus causing butt rot in oaks and other hardwood trees. It causes a white stringy rot in the roots and heartwood of the lower trunk, typically not extending more than 0.9–1.5 m (3–5 ft) upwards. The decay is mainly restricted to the heartwood, and external symptoms might include excessive tapering or flaring at the base of the trunk, cracks, seams, and sap flow. The fungus is known for its rapid growth rate compared to other wood-rotting fungi common on oaks.

While primarily a parasite, B. berkeleyi can also act as a saprophyte, thriving on dead hardwood trees or stumps. The fruiting bodies typically appear on infected trees in summer and fall.

== Edibility ==
B. berkeleyi is typically considered edible when young, tender and well cooked, the palatability decreases with age as the flesh becomes tough and bitter. Some sources compare the texture to shoe leather when older, while others suggest that the softer outer edges of older specimens can be consumed. Some field guides list the species as inedible or warn that it may cause gastrointestinal upset or allergic reactions in some individuals.

It may be able to be used to strengthen other flavors in dishes, much like tofu. It can also reportedly be used as a meat substitute. Preparation methods often involve parboiling or blanching to remove bitterness, followed by slicing and incorporating into stir-fries or other dishes.

== See also ==
- Largest fungal fruit bodies
