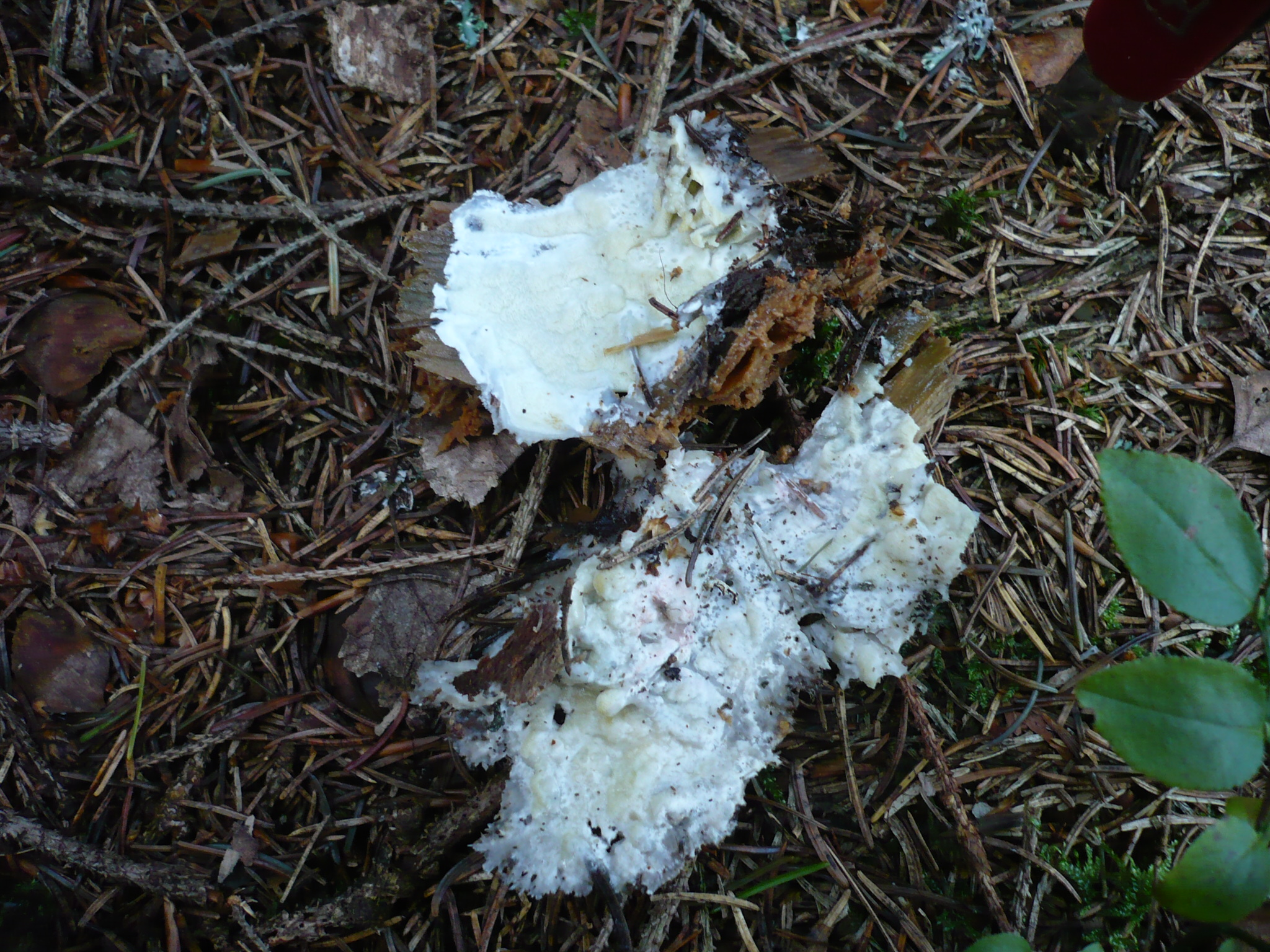
- Physisporinus vitreus

Scientific classification
- Domain: Eukaryota
- Kingdom: Fungi
- Division: Basidiomycota
- Class: Agaricomycetes
- Order: Polyporales
- Family: Meripilaceae
- Genus: Physisporinus; P.Karst. (1889)

Type species
- Physisporinus vitreus (Pers.) P.Karst. (1889)

Species
- P. carneopallens P. castanopsidis P. crocatus P. resinosus P. rivulosus P. roseus P. vitreus P. yunnanensis

= Physisporinus =

Genus of fungi

Physisporinus is a genus of fungi in the family Meripilaceae. The genus was circumscribed by Finish mycologist Petter Karsten in 1889.
