= Rigidoporus nevadensis =

Scientific classification
- Domain: Eukaryota
- Kingdom: Fungi
- Division: Basidiomycota
- Class: Agaricomycetes
- Order: Polyporales
- Family: Meripilaceae
- Genus: Rigidoporus
- Species: R. nevadensis

Binomial name
- Rigidoporus nevadensis Iturr. & Ryvarden 2010

Species of fungus

Rigidoporus nevadensis is a species of polypore fungus in the family Meripilaceae. Found in the Andes region of Venezuela, it was described as a new species in 2010 by mycologists Teresa Iturriaga and Leif Ryvarden.
