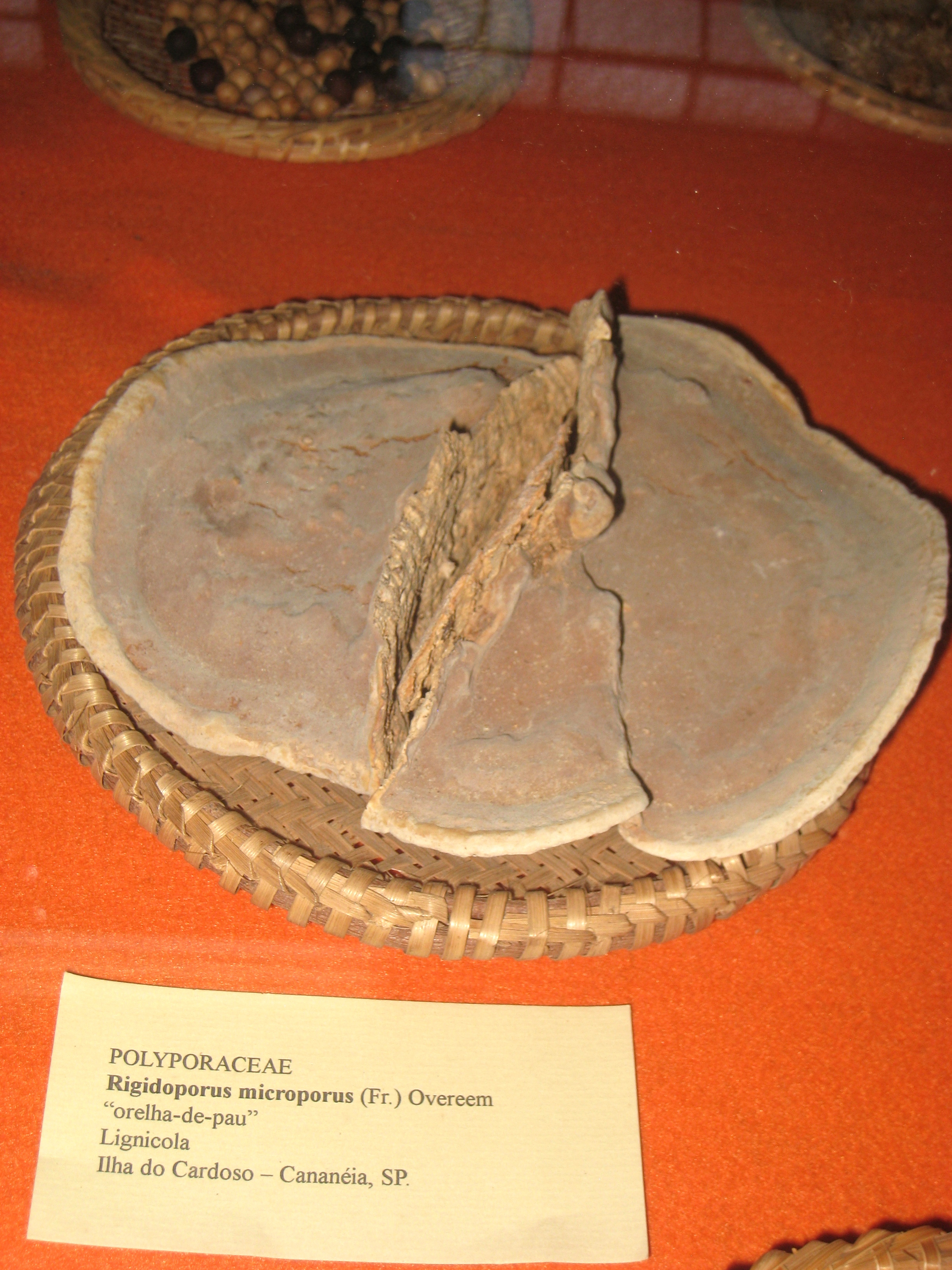

Scientific classification
- Kingdom: Fungi
- Division: Basidiomycota
- Class: Agaricomycetes
- Order: Polyporales
- Family: Meripilaceae
- Genus: Rigidoporus
- Species: R. microporus

Binomial name
- Rigidoporus microporus (Sw.) Overeem (1924)

Synonyms
- Boletus microporus Sw. (1806); Coriolus hondurensis Murrill (1907); Coriolus limitatus (Berk. & M.A.Curtis) Murrill (1907); Fomes auberianus (Mont.) Murrill (1905); Fomes auriformis (Mont.) Sacc. (1885); Fomes lignosus (Klotzsch) Bres. (1912); Fomes microporus (Sw.) Fr. (1885); Fomes semitostus (Berk.) Cooke (1885); Fomes sepiater (Cooke) Cooke (1885); Fomitopsis semitosta (Berk.) Ryvarde, (1972); Leptoporus armatus Pat. (1915); Leptoporus bakeri Pat. (1915); Leptoporus concrescens (Mont.) Pat. (1903); Leptoporus contractus (Berk.) Pat. (1900); Leptoporus evolutus (Berk. & M.A. Curtis) Pat. (1903); Leptoporus lignosus (Klotzsch) R.Heim (1934); Microporus concrescens (Mont.) Kuntze (1898); Microporus petalodes (Berk.) Kuntze (1898); Microporus unguiformis (Lév.) Kuntze (1898); Oxyporus auberianus (Mont.) Kreisel (1971); Oxyporus lignosus (Klotzsch) A.Roy & A.B.De (1998); Polyporus armatus (Pat.) Sacc. & Trotter (1925); Polyporus auberianus Mont. (1842); Polyporus auriformis Mont. (1854); Polyporus bakeri (Pat.) Sacc. & Trotter (1925); Polyporus concrescens Mont. (1835); Polyporus contractus Berk. (1847); Polyporus evolutus Berk. & M.A. Curtis (1868); Polyporus lignosus Klotzsch (1833); Polyporus microporus (Sw.) Fr. (1821); Polyporus minutodurus Lloyd (1922); Polyporus petalodes Berk. (1856); Polyporus phlebeius Berk. (1855); Polyporus semitostus Berk. (1854); Polyporus sepiater Cooke (1881); Polyporus unguiformis Lév. (1846); Polystictus concrescens (Mont.) Cooke (1886); Polystictus hondurensis (Murrill) Sacc. & Trotter (1912); Polystictus petalodes (Berk.) Cooke (1886); Polystictus unguiformis (Lév.) Cooke (1886); Rigidoporus concrescens (Mont.) Rajchenb. (1992); Rigidoporus evolutus (Berk. & M.A.Curtis) Murrill (1907); Rigidoporus lignosus (Klotzsch) Imazeki (1952); Scindalma auriforme (Mont.) Kuntze (1898); Scindalma microporum (Sw.) Kuntze (1898); Scindalma semitostum (Berk.) Kuntze (1898); Scindalma sepiatrum (Cooke) Kuntze (1898); Trametes evolutus (Berk. & M.A.Curtis) Murrill (1907); Trametes limitata Berk. & M.A.Curtis (1872); Trametes semitosta (Berk.) Corner (1989); Ungulina auberiana (Mont.) Pat. (1900); Ungulina contracta (Berk.) Pat. (1900); Ungulina semitosta (Berk.) Pat. (1900)

= Rigidoporus microporus =

Species of fungus

Rigidoporus microporus is a plant pathogen, known to cause white root rot disease on various tropical crops, such as cacao, cassava, tea, with economical importance on the para rubber tree (Hevea brasiliensis).

== White root rot of rubber ==
Rigidoporus lignosus (klotzsch) Imazeki, the causal agent of white root rot, was first reported on rubber in 1904 from Botanical Gardens, Singapore. It belongs to the order Basidiomycete, and in the family Polyporaceae. The disease originates on roots and later spreads to collar region. Foliar symptoms are initiated subsequently with the destruction of the root system. Its above ground symptoms indicate that the trees are mostly beyond treatment and recovery, as rapid progress of infection makes death imminent. This disease caused significant mortality to tree irrespective of age or health status, causing economic losses to the latex industry in many countries. It is the most destructive root disease in rubber plantations in Sri Lanka and many other rubber growing countries. White root rot has now become the most threatening root disease of the rubber tree in both Asian and African continents, which supply 98% of the natural rubber to the world market. In Indonesia alone, the affected area is more than 80,000 ha. As a whole 5–10% of the cultivated lands are in bare patches due to this deadly disease. International Rubber Research and Development Board survey indicates that this disease is described as "severe" in Côte d'Ivoire, Nigeria and Sri Lanka, and as a significant, endemic problem in Gabon, Indonesia, Malaysia and Thailand. The causative agent (Rigidoporus lignosus) persists on dead or live root debris for a long time, while causing new infections on healthy plants. This fungus has a wide host range (more than 100 woody species in the Ivory Coast have been recorded as being susceptible) and causes the greatest losses in plantations of H. brasiliensis and, to a lesser extent, of teak (Tectona grandis L.).

The fungus forms many white, somewhat flattened mycelia strands 1–2 mm thick that grow on and adhere strongly to the surface of the root bark. These rhizomorphs grow rapidly and may extend several meters through the soil in the absence of any woody substrate. Thus, healthy rubber trees can be infected by free rhizomorphs growing from stumps or infected woody debris buried in the ground as well as by roots contacting those of a diseased neighboring tree. Internal progression of the fungus in root tissues lags well behind the front of epiphytic growth of the mycelium on the root. In this respect, the mode of development of R. lignosus is characteristic of an ectotrophic growth habit. After rhizomorphs infect the roots, the fungus preferentially penetrates the taproot, deep in the soil. First, however, the rhizomorphs must change morphogenetically into infectious hyphae, characterized by degrading extracellular enzymes able to decay the wood. This mechanism is strictly regulated by conditions of partial anoxia in the soil, at a depth determined by whether the texture is sandy or clayey.

Wood colonization inside the taproot spreads up to the collar and to other portions of the root system. A controlled and effective method for artificially infecting young Hevea plants has been developed by reproducing the conditions of soil anoxia in the greenhouse. In contrast with the pale pinkish – yellow colour of healthy root tissues, freshly colonized wood tissues are brownish red. This coloration fades along a gradient from the progression front of the parasite toward the tissues colonized earlier, where the wood is particularly friable. R. lignosus causes a white rot of the wood characterized by degradation of lignin in the cell walls. The orange-yellow sporophores form mainly during the rainy season at the base of trees heavily attacked by the fungus. The bracket form is most common, but a resupinate form also exists. These sporophores produce a large number of basidiospores, even during the dry season, but seem to have a limited role in disseminating the disease. This has been one of the most controversial points in the biology of R. lignosus since the beginning of this century. The spores are viable, but there is agreement now that the probability of a spore germinating in situ on a receptive substrate is extremely low. In Hevea plantations established immediately after a forest is cleared, mycelia filaments of R. lignosus cause infection (Pichel, 1956). In second plantings, however, spores can constitute inoculum for infecting the stump surfaces of old rubber trees remaining between the planting rows.
