= Grifola gargal =

Scientific classification
- Kingdom: Fungi
- Division: Basidiomycota
- Class: Agaricomycetes
- Order: Polyporales
- Family: Grifolaceae
- Genus: Grifola
- Species: G. gargal

Binomial name
- Grifola gargal Singer, 1969

Species of fungus

Grifola gargal is a species of polypore fungus in the family Grifolaceae. Found in Chile, it was described as new to science in 1969.
