= Polystictus rufopictus =

Polystictus rufopictus may refer to two different species of fungi:

- Polystictus rufopictus Berk. & M.A. Curtis ex Cooke (1886), a taxonomic synonym for the plant pathogen Rigidoporus lineatus
- Polystictus rufopictus sensu Spegazzini (1972), a taxonomic synonym for the plant pathogen oak conk (Fuscoporia gilva)
