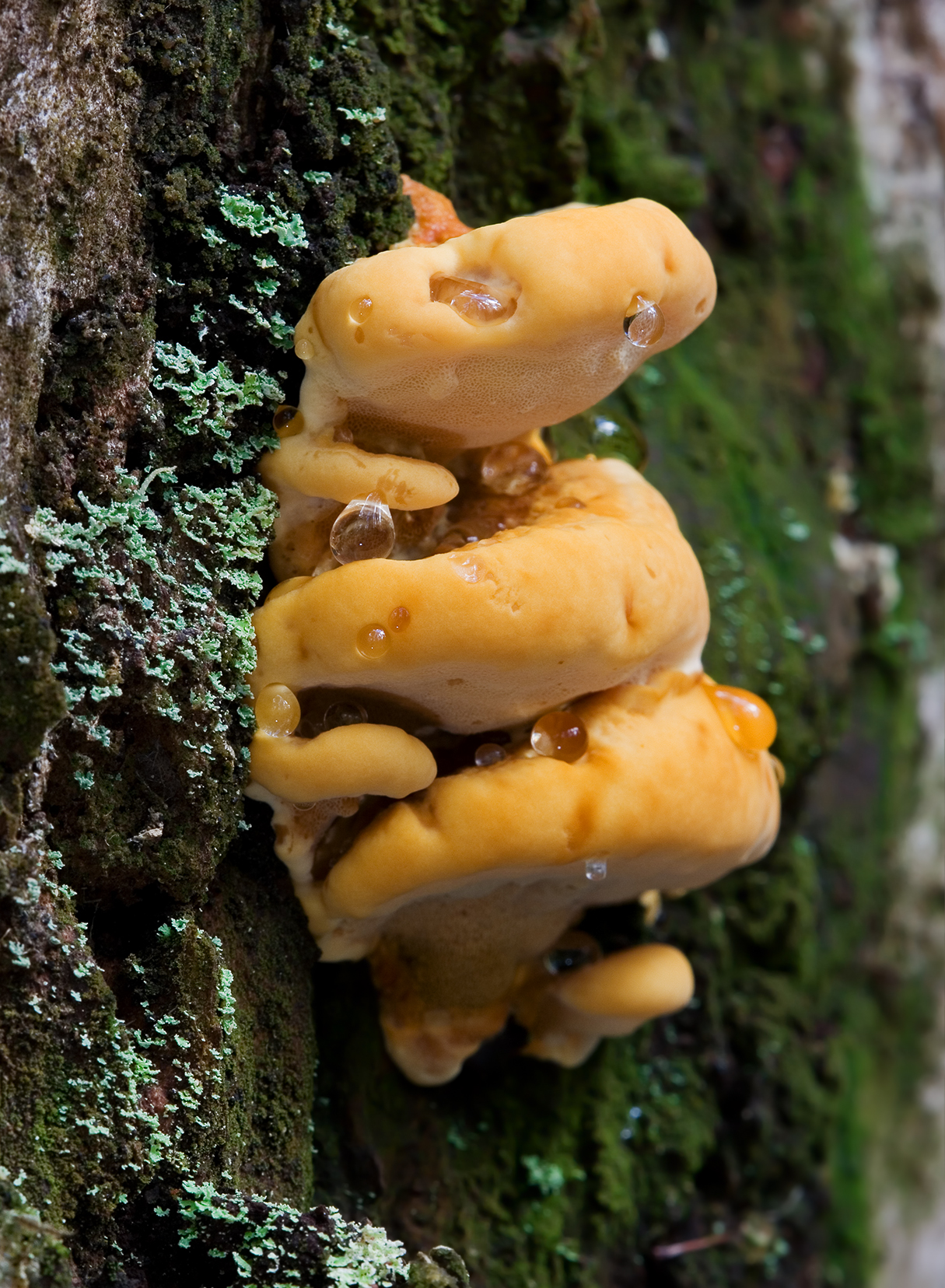
- Rigidoporus laetus, Australia

Scientific classification
- Kingdom: Fungi
- Division: Basidiomycota
- Class: Agaricomycetes
- Order: Polyporales
- Family: Meripilaceae
- Genus: Rigidoporus; Murrill (1905)

Type species
- Rigidoporus lineatus (Pers.) Ryvarden (1972)

Species
- ~ 40, see text

Synonyms
- Leucofomes Kotlába & Pouzar (1957)

= Rigidoporus =

Genus of fungi

Rigidoporus is a genus of fungi in the family Meripilaceae. Many of the species in this genus are plant pathogens. The widespread genus, which contains about forty species, was originally circumscribed by American mycologist William Alphonso Murrill in 1905. The generic name combines the Latin word rigidus ("rigid") with the Ancient Greek word πόρος ("pore").

== Species ==
- Rigidoporus adnatus Corner (1987)
- Rigidoporus albiporus Corner (1992)
- Rigidoporus amazonicus Ryvarden (1987)
- Rigidoporus aurantiacus Ryvarden & Iturr. (2003)
- Rigidoporus aureofulvus (Lloyd) P.K.Buchanan & Ryvarden (1988)
- Rigidoporus biokoensis (Bres. ex Lloyd) Ryvarden (1972)
- Rigidoporus brunneus Ryvarden (2014)
- Rigidoporus camschadalicus (Parmasto) Domanski (1974)
- Rigidoporus cinereus Núñez & Ryvarden (1999) – Japan
- Rigidoporus crocatus (Pat.) Ryvarden (1983)
- Rigidoporus cystidioides (Lloyd) Corner (1987)
- Rigidoporus defibulatus (D.A.Reid) Corner (1987)
- Rigidoporus dextrinoideus I.Johans. & Ryvarden (1979)
- Rigidoporus eminens Y.C.Dai (1998) – China
- Rigidoporus erectus Corner (1987)
- Rigidoporus fibulatus H.S.Yuan & Y.C.Dai (2012)
- Rigidoporus furcatus Núñez & Ryvarden (2001)
- Rigidoporus grandisporus Ryvarden, Gomes-Silva & Gibertoni (2014) – Brazil
- Rigidoporus hainanicus J.D.Zhao & X.Q.Zhang (1991)
- Rigidoporus hypobrunneides Corner (1987)
- Rigidoporus incarnatus Corner (1987)
- Rigidoporus incurvus (Berk. ex Cooke) Ryvarden (1988)
- Rigidoporus laetus (Cooke) P.K.Buchanan & Ryvarden (1988)
- Rigidoporus lineatus (Pers.) Ryvarden (1972)
- Rigidoporus longicystidius P.K.Buchanan & Ryvarden (2000)
- Rigidoporus malayanus (Corner) T.Hatt. (2003)
- Rigidoporus mariae T.B.Gibertoni, A.C.Gomes-Silva & Ryvarden (2014) – Brazil
- Rigidoporus micropendulus Læssøe & Ryvarden (2010)
- Rigidoporus microporus (Sw.) Overeem (1924)
- Rigidoporus minutus B.K.Cui & Y.C.Dai (2009)
- Rigidoporus moeszii (Pilát ex Pilát) Pouzar (1966)
- Rigidoporus mutabilis I.Lindblad & Ryvarden (1999)
- Rigidoporus nevadensis Iturr. & Ryvarden (2010)
- Rigidoporus ochraceicinctus Corner (1992)
- Rigidoporus parvulus Corner (1987)
- Rigidoporus patellarius Corner (1987)
- Rigidoporus pendulus Ryvarden (1990)
- Rigidoporus pouzarii Vampola & Vlasák (2012)
- Rigidoporus sanguinolentus (Alb. & Schwein.) Donk (1966)
- Rigidoporus subpileatus Corner (1987)
- Rigidoporus substereinus Murrill (1907)
- Rigidoporus sulphureus Corner (1987)
- Rigidoporus trametoides Corner (1987)
- Rigidoporus ulmarius (Sowerby) Imazeki (1952)
- Rigidoporus umbonatipes Rajchenb. (1987)
- Rigidoporus undatus (Pers.) Donk (1967)
- Rigidoporus vinaceus Corner (1987)
- Rigidoporus vinctus (Berk.) Ryvarden (1972)
