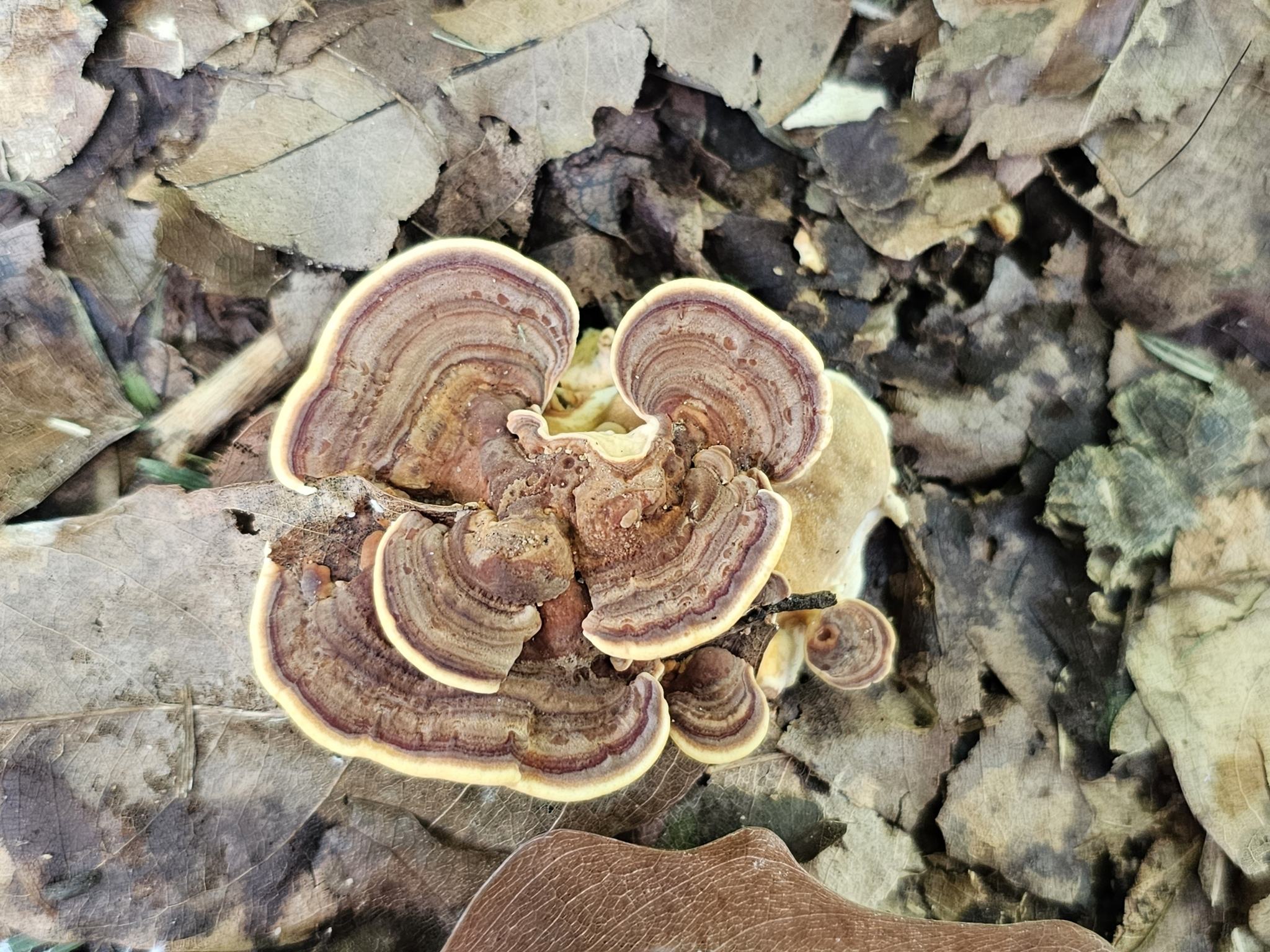

Scientific classification
- Domain: Eukaryota
- Kingdom: Fungi
- Division: Basidiomycota
- Class: Agaricomycetes
- Order: Polyporales
- Family: Meripilaceae
- Genus: Rigidoporus
- Species: R. lineatus

Binomial name
- Rigidoporus lineatus (Pers.) Ryvarden (1972)

Synonyms
- List: Fomes punctatus (Jungh.) Cooke (1885); Fomes pusiolus (Ces.) Cooke (1885); Fomes zonalis (Berk.) Teng (1963); Fomitopsis zonalis (Berk.) Imazeki, (1943); Hansenia zonalis (Berk.) P.Karst. (1880); Leptoporus microstomus (Berk. & M.A.Curtis) Pat., (1903); Microporus cotyledoneus (Speg.) Kuntze (1898); Microporus inconspicuus (Miq.) Kuntze (1898); Microporus lineatus (Pers.) Kuntze (1898); Microporus plumbeus (Lév.) Kuntze (1898); Microporus rufopictus (Berk. & M.A.Curtis ex Cooke) Kuntze, (1898); Microporus surinamensis (Miq.) Kuntze (1898); Physisporinus lineatus (Pers.) F. Wu, Jia J. Chen & Y.C. Dai (2017); Polyporus cotyledoneus Speg. (1880); Polyporus guhae Bose, (1922); Polyporus inconspicuus Miq. (1839); Polyporus lineatus Pers. (1827); Polyporus micromegas Mont. (1842); Polyporus microstomus Berk. & M.A.Curtis, (1869); Polyporus plumbeus Lév. (1846); Polyporus punctatus Jungh. (1838); Polyporus pusiolus Ces. (1879); Polyporus rufopictus Berk. & M.A. Curtis ex Cooke (1886); Polyporus zonalis var. resupinatus Trotter 378 (1925); Polyporus subliberatus Berk. & M.A.Curtis (1869); Polyporus surinamensis Miq. (1839); Polyporus zonalis Berk. (1843); Polystictus cotyledoneus (Speg.) Sacc. (1888); Polystictus inconspicuus (Miq.) Sacc. (1888); Polystictus lineatus (Pers.) Sacc. (1888); Polystictus plumbeus (Lév.) Cooke, (1886); Polystictus rufopictus Berk. & M.A.Curtis ex Cooke, (1886); Polystictus surinamensis (Miq.) Cooke 1886); Polystictus zonalis (Berk.) Fr. (1851); Poria subliberata (Berk. & M.A.Curtis) Sacc. (1888); Rigidoporus micromegas (Mont.) Murrill (1905); Rigidoporus micromegas var. aurantiacus Corner (1987); Rigidoporus surinamensis (Miq.) Murrill (1907); Rigidoporus surinamensis var. subauberianus Murrill (1942); Rigidoporus zonalis (Berk.) Imazeki (1952); Scindalma punctatum (Jungh.) Kuntze (1898); Scindalma pusiolum (Ces.) Kuntze (1898); Trametes microstomus (Berk. & M.A. Curtis) Murrill (1907); Trichaptum zonale (Berk.) G.Cunn. (1965)

= Rigidoporus lineatus =

Species of fungus

Rigidoporus lineatus is a species of fungal plant pathogen infecting plane trees.
