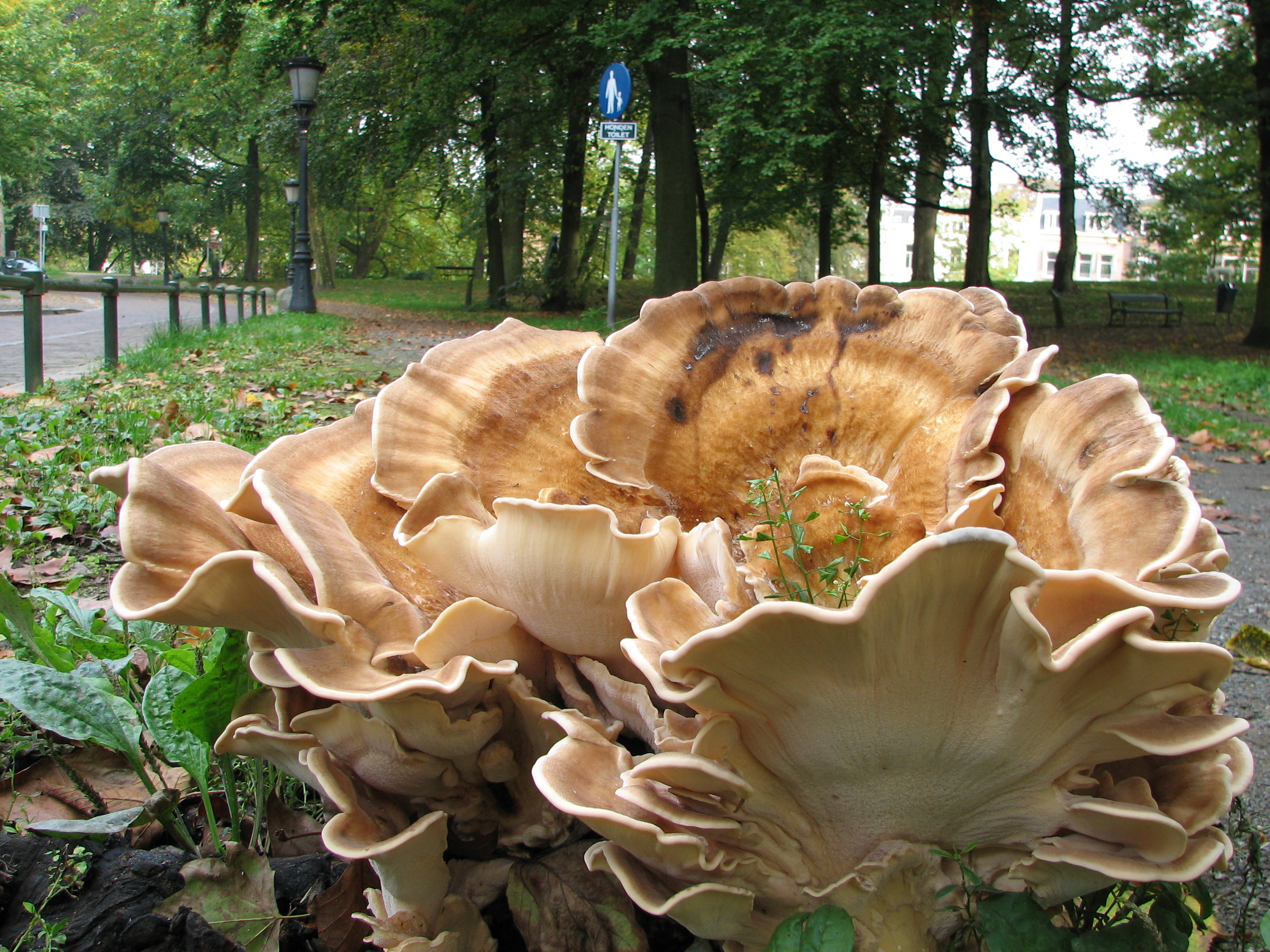
- Meripilus giganteus

Scientific classification
- Domain: Eukaryota
- Kingdom: Fungi
- Division: Basidiomycota
- Class: Agaricomycetes
- Order: Polyporales
- Family: Meripilaceae
- Genus: Meripilus; P.Karst. (1882)

Type species
- Meripilus giganteus (Pers.) P.Karst. (1882)

Species
- M. applanatus M. giganteus M. maculatus M. sumstinei M. tropicalis M. villosulus

Synonyms
- Flabellopilus Kotlába & Pouzar (1957); Porodon Fr. (1851)

= Meripilus =

Genus of fungi

Meripilus is a fungal genus in the family Meripilaceae. The genus name combines the Ancient Greek words μερίς ("part" or "portion") and πῖλος ("cap").

== Species ==
- Meripilus applanatus Corner (1984) – South Solomons
- Meripilus giganteus (Pers.) P.Karst. (1882) – Europe
- Meripilus maculatus Corner (1984) – Sumatra
- Meripilus sumstinei (Murrill) M.J.Larsen & Lombard (1988) – North America
- Meripilus tropicalis Guzmán & Pérez-Silva (1975) – Mexico
- Meripilus villosulus Corner (1984)– Peninsular Malaysia
