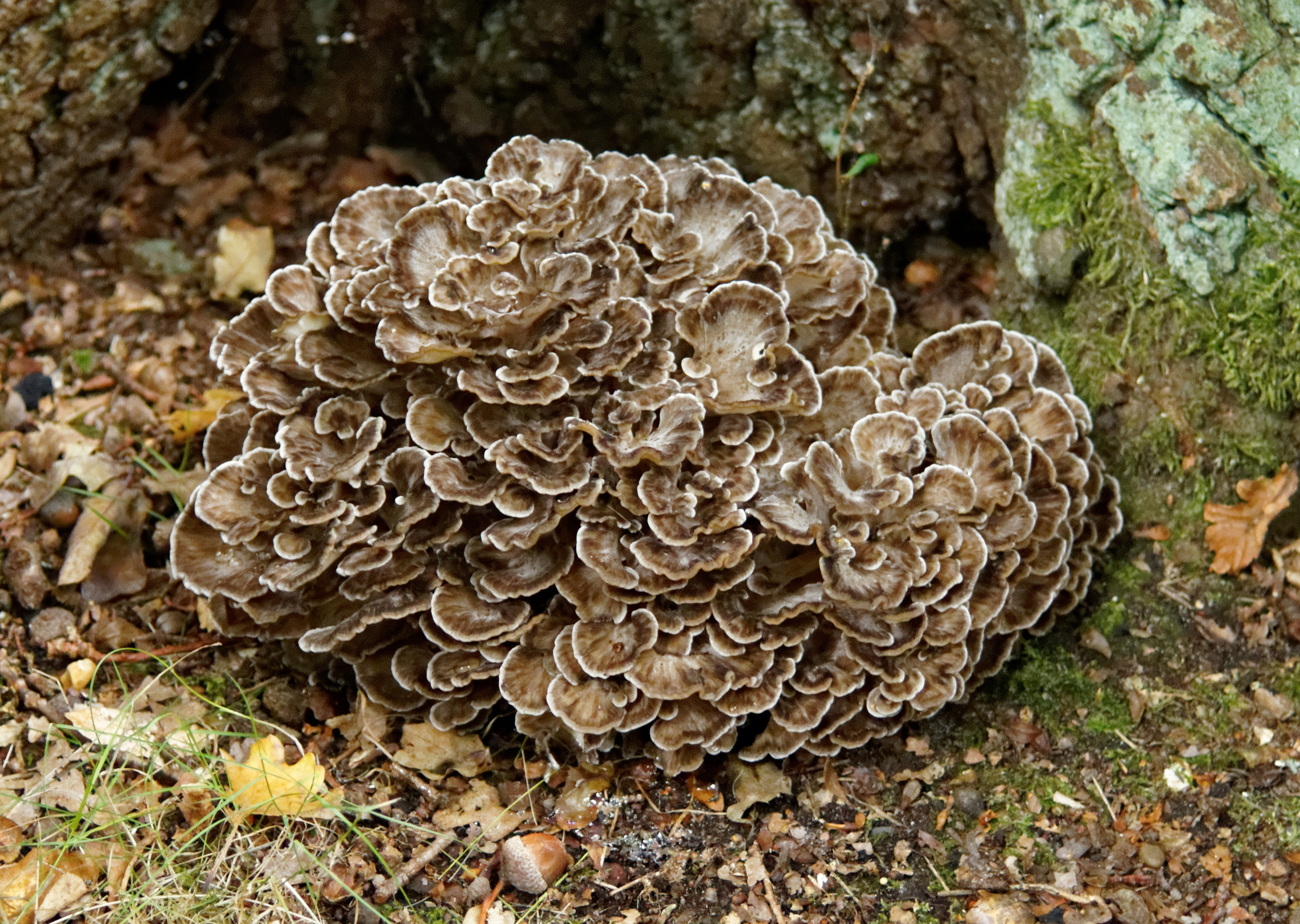

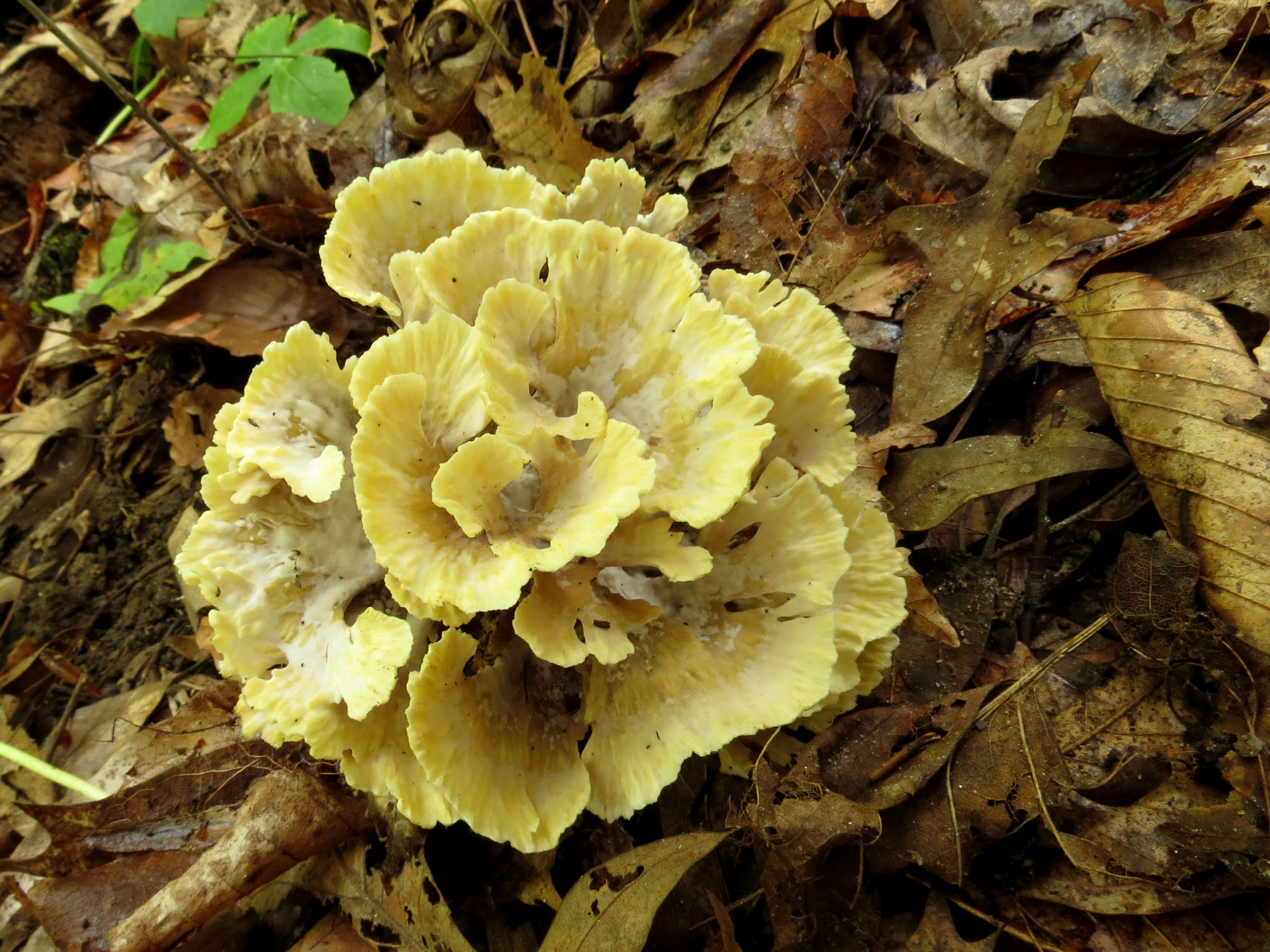

Scientific classification
- Kingdom: Fungi
- Division: Basidiomycota
- Class: Agaricomycetes
- Order: Polyporales
- Family: Grifolaceae
- Genus: Grifola
- Species: G. frondosa

Binomial name
- Grifola frondosa (Dicks.) Gray (1821)

Synonyms
- Boletus frondosus Dicks. (1785); Polyporus frondosus Fr.

= Grifola frondosa =

Maitake

Grifola frondosa
- Mycological characteristics
- Pores on hymenium
- Cap is offset or indistinct
- Hymenium is decurrent
- Stipe is bare
- Spore print is white
- Ecology is parasitic
- Edibility is choice or can cause allergic reactions

Grifola frondosa, also known as hen-of-the-woods, sheep's head, ram's head, or maitake (舞茸, "dancing mushroom") in Japanese, is a polypore mushroom that grows at the base of trees, particularly old growth oaks or maples. It is native to China, Europe, and North America.

It is an edible mushroom long used in East Asian cuisine and studied for its potential health benefits, though no high-quality clinical evidence supports its medicinal use.

== Description ==
G. frondosa grows from an underground tuber-like structure known as a sclerotium, about the size of a potato. The fruiting bodies form clumps up to 50 cm (20 in) or rarely larger, possibly up to 150 cm (60 in). The mushrooms toughen as they mature.

The caps are grayish-brown, often curled or spoon-shaped, with wavy margins and 2–10 cm (1–4 in) broad. The undersurface of each cap bears about one to three pores per millimeter, with the tubes rarely deeper than 3 mm (1/8 in). The cream-coloured stipe (stalk) has a branchy structure. The spore print is white.

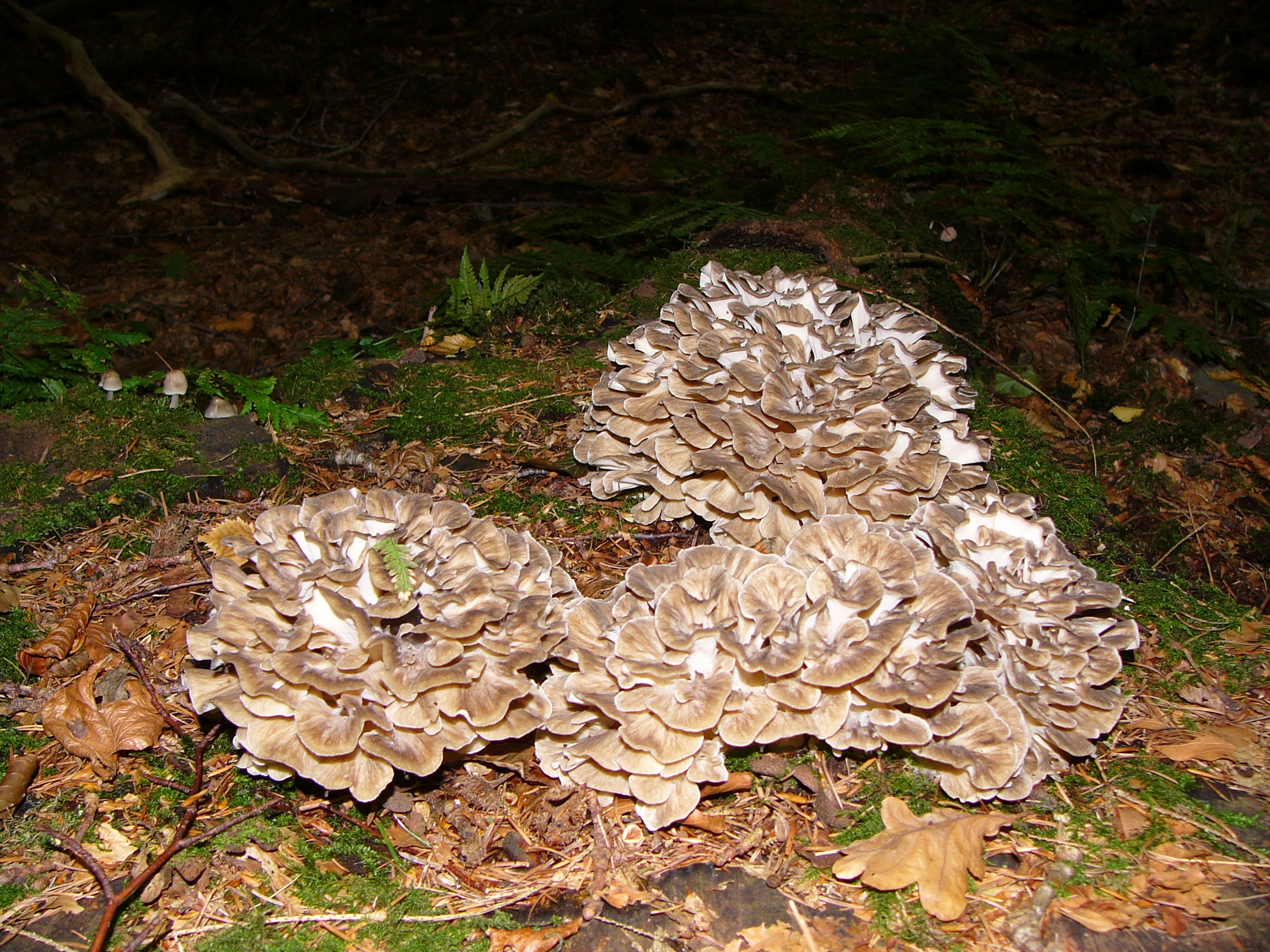
Clumps

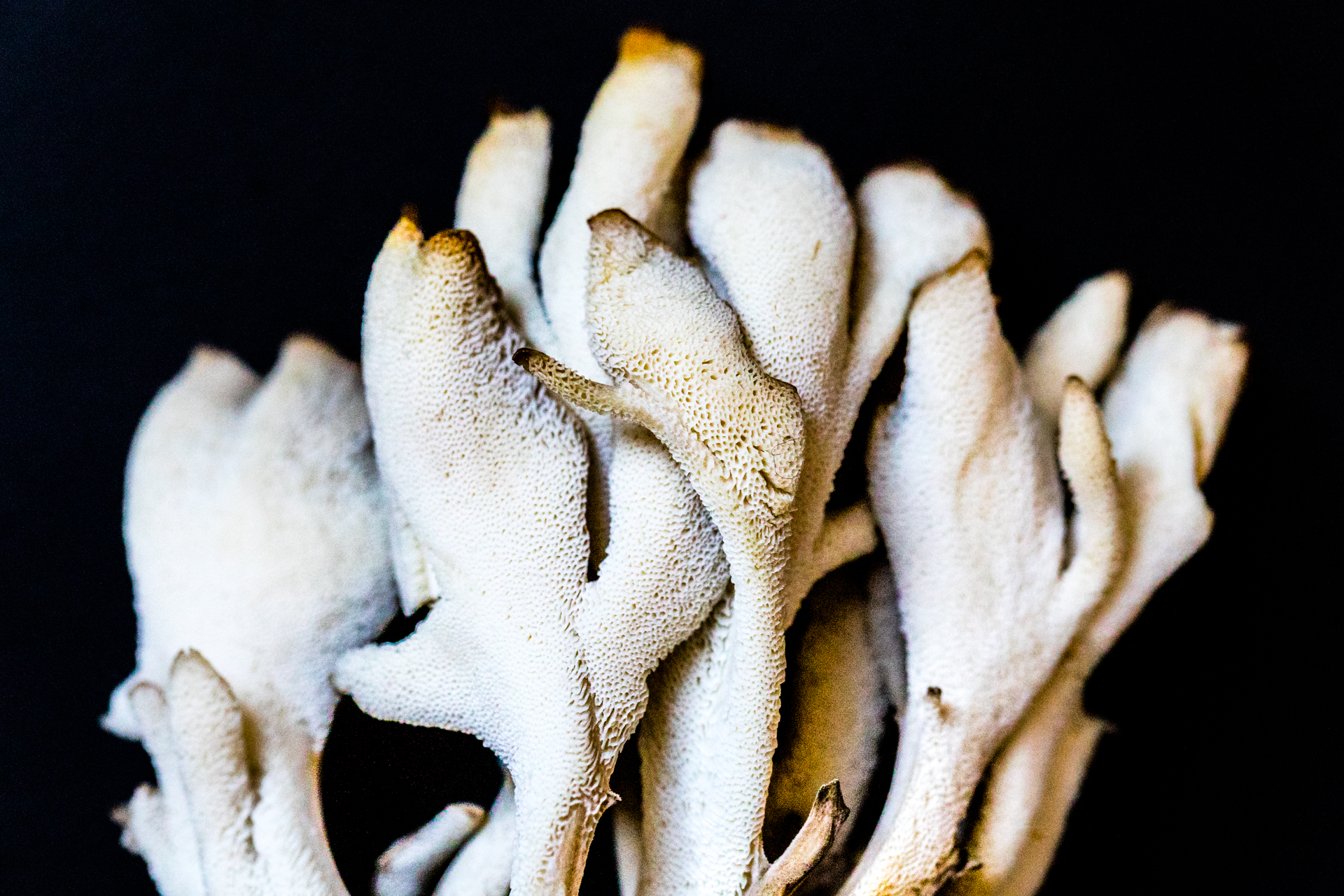
Close-up

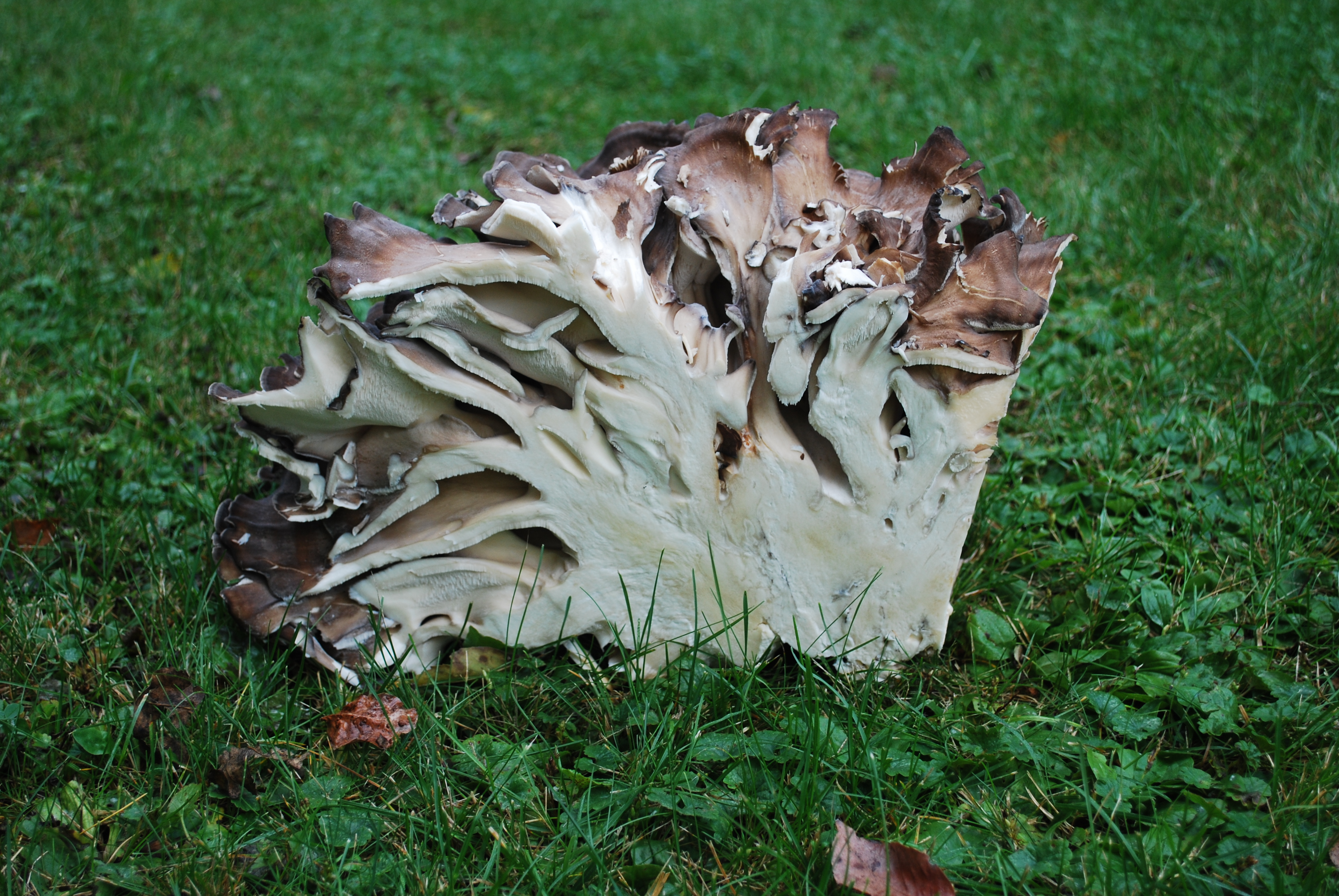
Cross-section

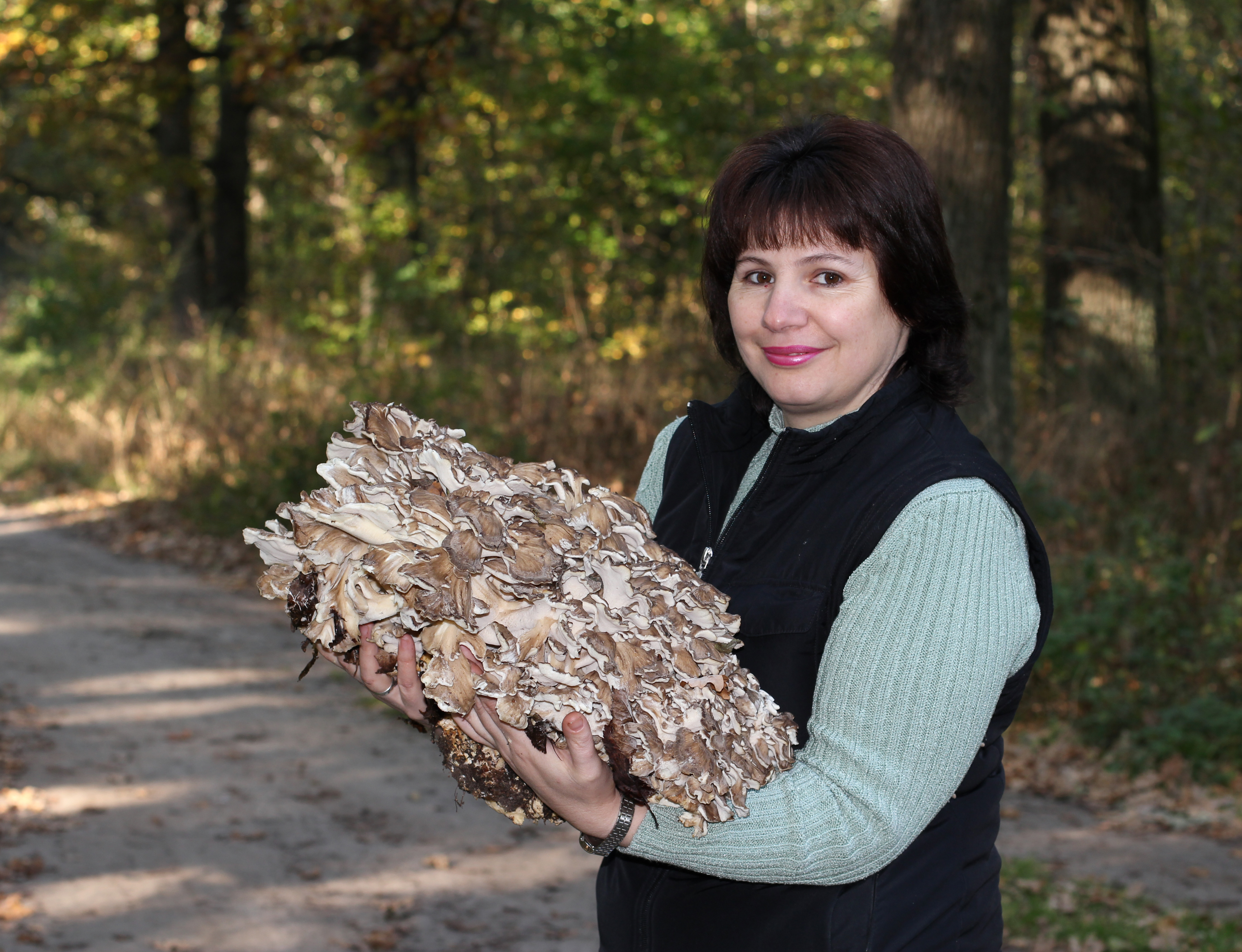
Vinnytsia Raion, Ukraine

=== Similar species ===
G. frondosa is a very distinct mushroom except for its cousin, the black staining mushroom, which is similar in taste but rubbery. Edible species which look similar to G. frondosa include Meripilus sumstinei (which stains black), Sparassis spathulata and Laetiporus sulphureus, another edible bracket fungus that is commonly called chicken of the woods or "sulphur shelf". Polyporus umbellatus has distinct roundish caps.

== Distribution and habitat ==
It is native to China, Europe (August to October), and eastern North America (from September to October).

It occurs most prolifically in eastern North America, but has been found as far west as Idaho.

Like the sulphur shelf mushroom, G. frondosa is a perennial fungus that often grows in the same place for several years in succession.

== Uses ==
The species is a choice edible mushroom, especially the young caps when slow cooked, although some may be allergic to it. The softer caps must be thoroughly cooked. It can also be pickled.

Maitake has been consumed for centuries in China and Japan where it is one of the major culinary mushrooms. The mushroom is used in many Japanese dishes, such as nabemono.

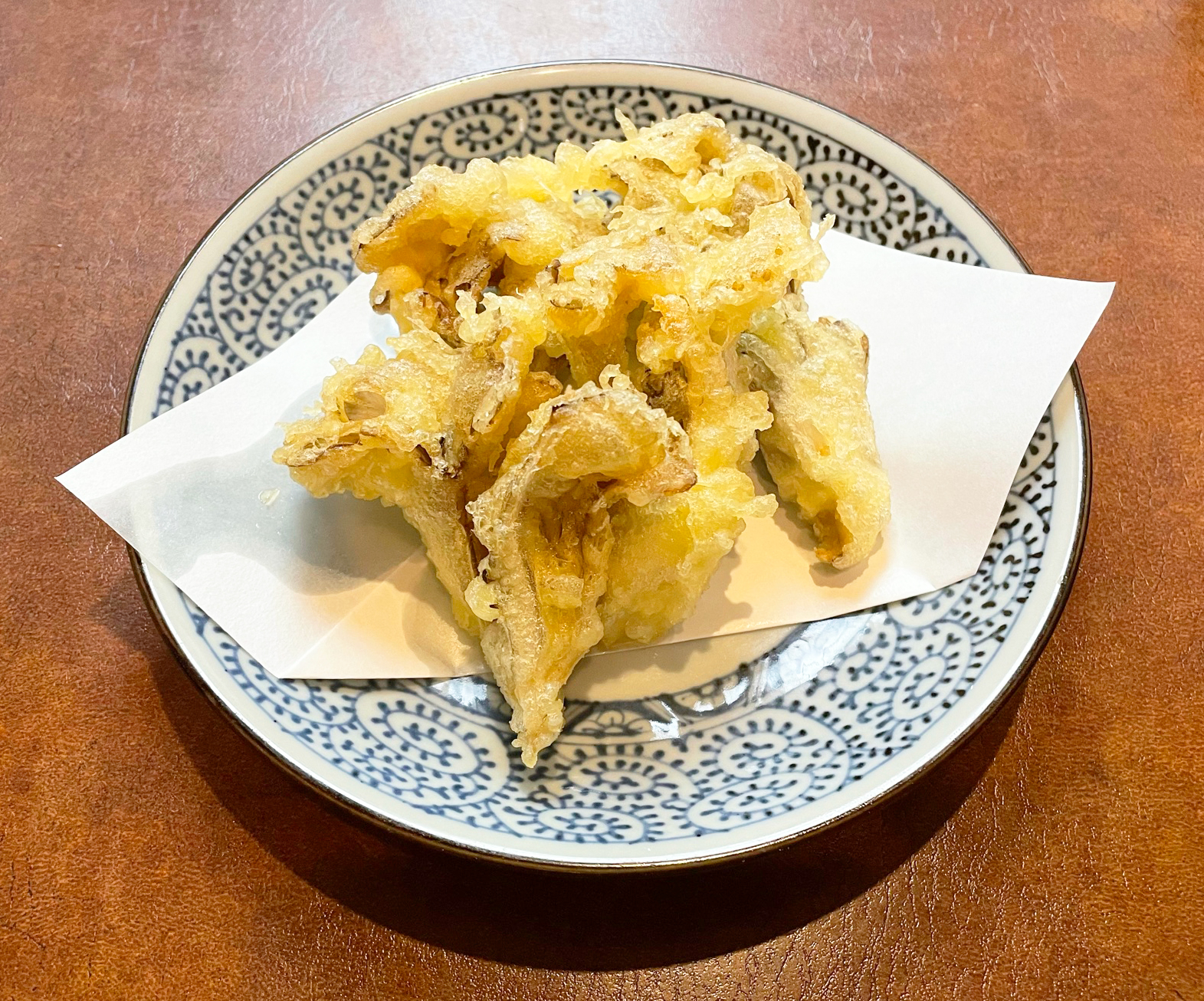
Maitake tempura

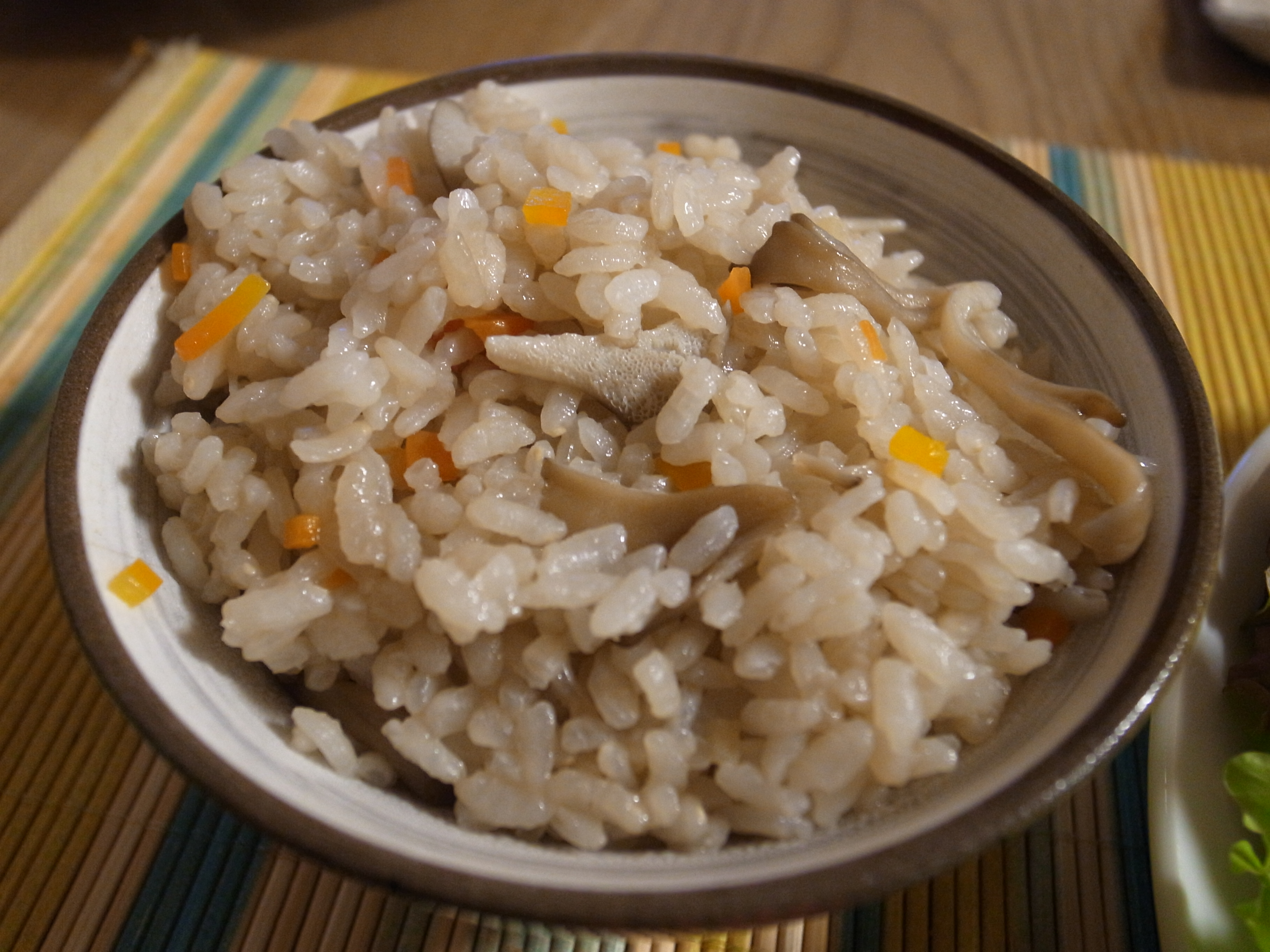
In takikomi gohan

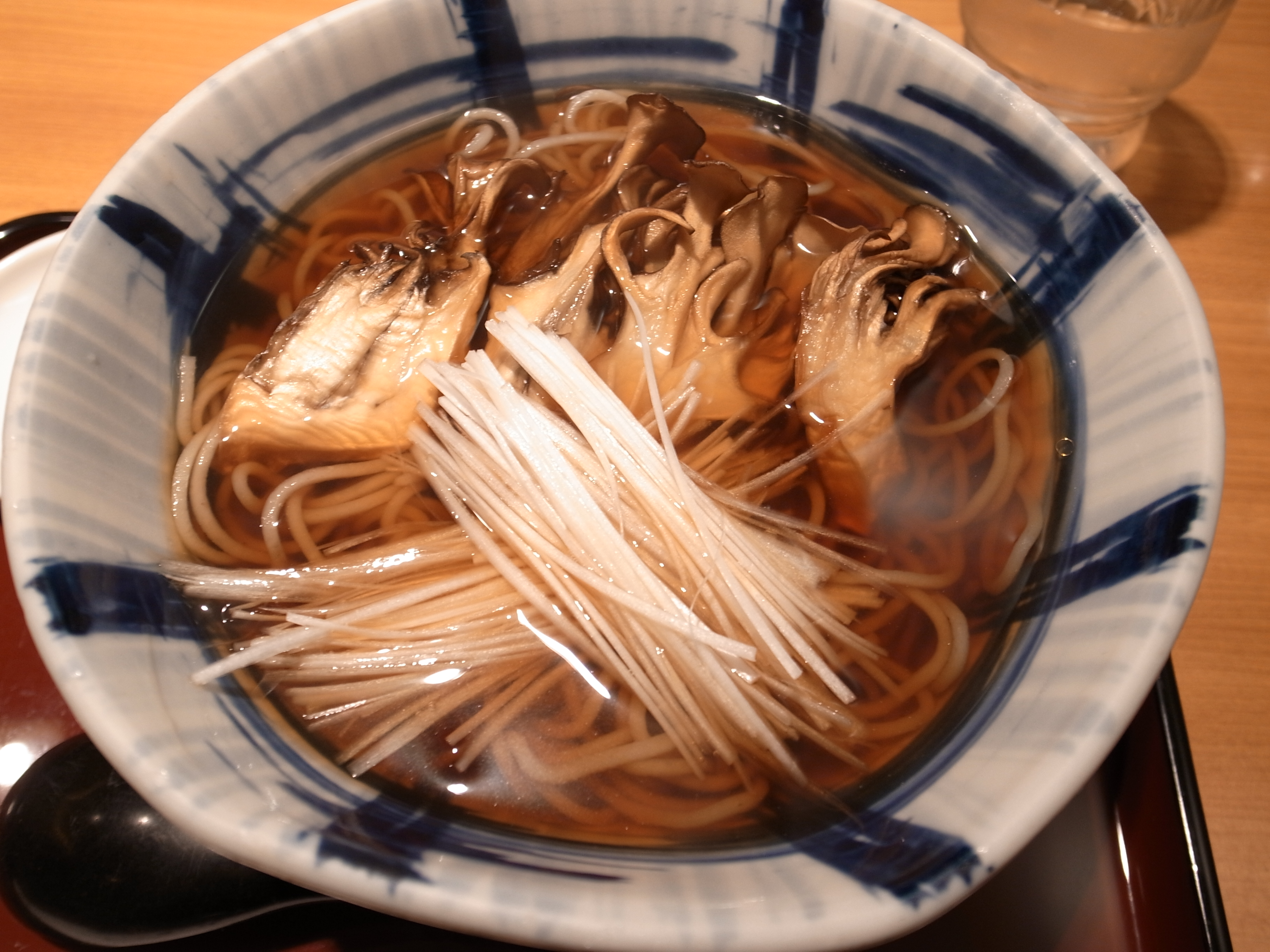
With soba noodles

=== Research ===
Although under laboratory and preliminary clinical research for many years, particularly for the possible biological effects of its polysaccharides, there are no completed, high-quality Phase III clinical studies for the species as of 2019.

According to a 2009 study, a sulfated polysaccharide extracted from the species can serve as an immunomodulator for survivors of breast cancer with no apparent maximum dose, although the botanical source "may not produce optimal clinical effects".
