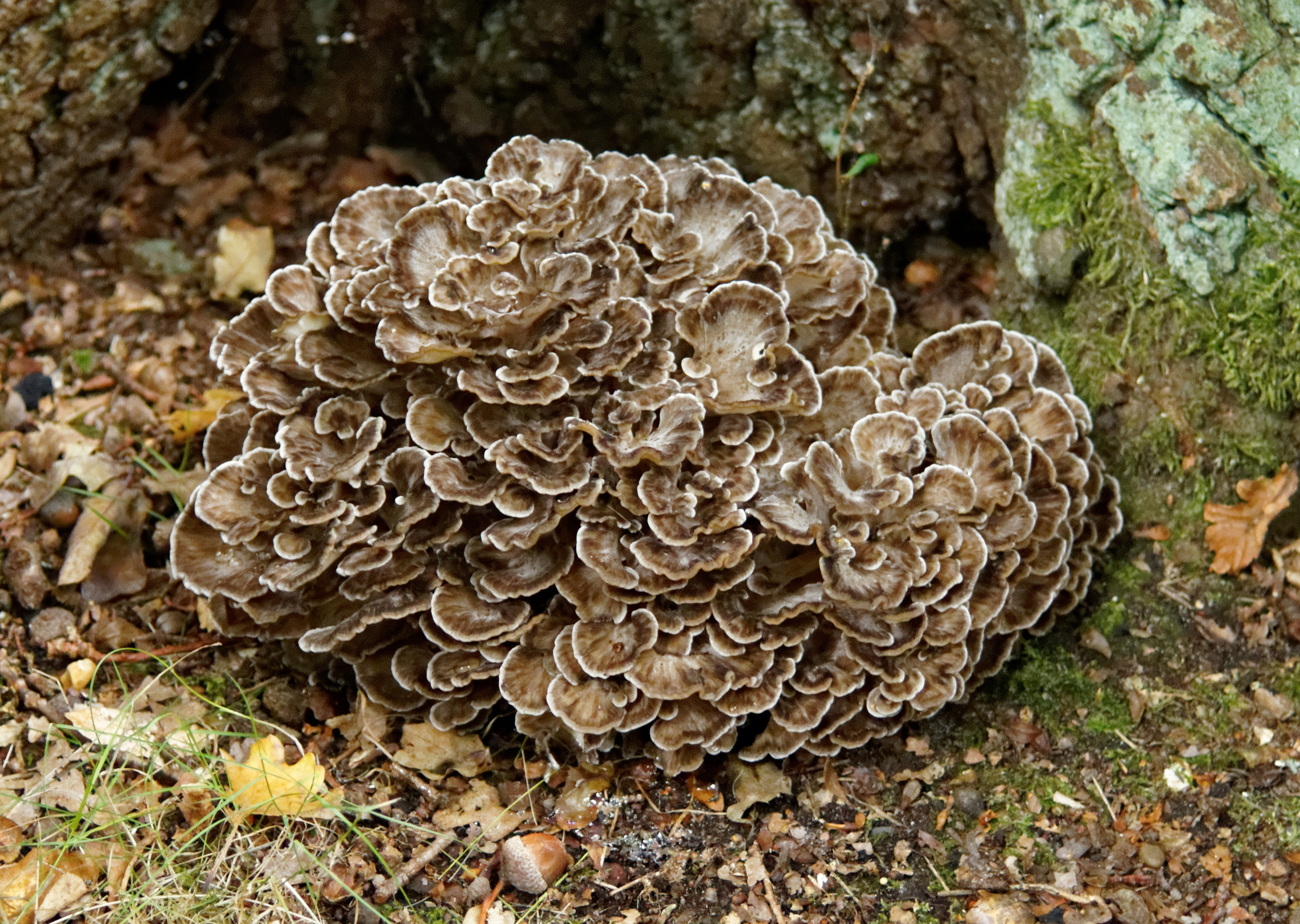
- Grifola frondosa

Scientific classification
- Kingdom: Fungi
- Division: Basidiomycota
- Class: Agaricomycetes
- Order: Polyporales
- Family: Grifolaceae

Type genus
- Grifola Gray 1821

= Grifolaceae =

Family of Fungi

The Grifolaceae are a family of fungi in the order Polyporales.

== Systematics ==
The family contains following genera:

- Aegis Gómez-Mont., Rajchenb. & Robledo 2017
- Cautinia Maas Geest. 1967
- Cladodendron Lázaro Ibiza 1916
- Cladomeris Quél. 1886
- Grifola Gray 1821
- Merisma (Fr.) Gillet 1878
- Polypilus P. Karst. 1881
