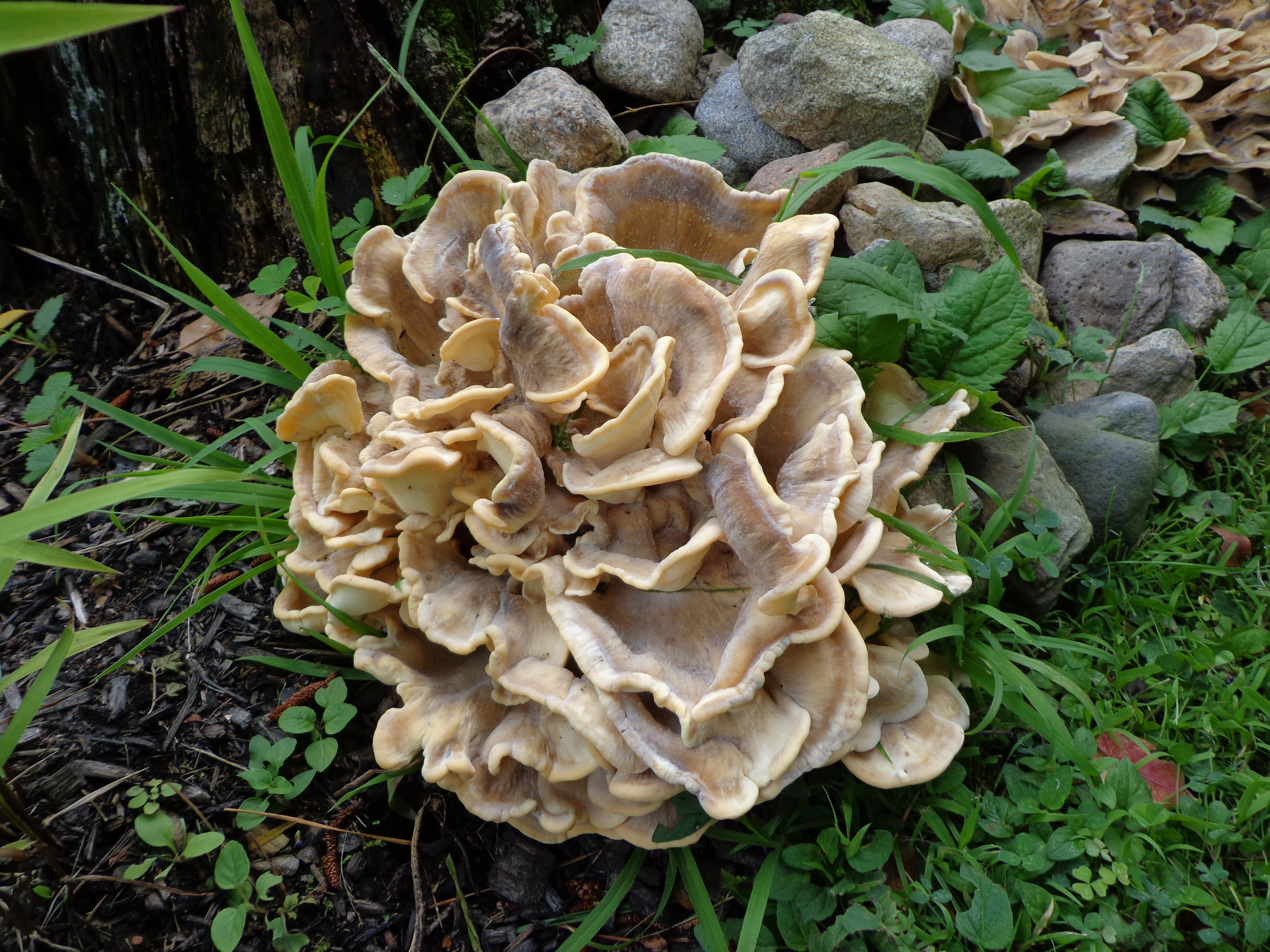

Scientific classification
- Kingdom: Fungi
- Division: Basidiomycota
- Class: Agaricomycetes
- Order: Polyporales
- Family: Meripilaceae
- Genus: Meripilus
- Species: M. sumstinei

Binomial name
- Meripilus sumstinei (Murrill) M.J.Larsen & Lombard (1988)

Synonyms
- Grifola sumstinei Murrill (1904); Polyporus sumstinei (Murrill) Sacc. & D.Sacc. (1905); Polypilus sumstinei (Murrill) Bondartsev & Singer (1941)

= Meripilus sumstinei =

Species of fungus

Meripilus sumstinei, commonly known as the giant polypore or the black-staining polypore, is a species of fungus in the family Meripilaceae.

== Taxonomy ==
Originally described in 1905 by William Alphonso Murrill as Grifola sumstinei, the species was transferred to Meripilus in 1988.

== Description ==
The cap of this polypore is 5–20 centimetres (2–8 in) wide, with folds of flesh up to 8–20 millimetres (1/4–3/4 in) thick. It has white to brownish concentric zones and tapers toward the base; the stipe is indistinct.

== Distribution and habitat ==
It is found in eastern North America from June to September. It grows in large clumps on the ground around hardwood (including oak) trunks, stumps, and logs. It also grows in clumps above dead tree logs, stumps, and branches. It prefers shady areas to grow in.

== Uses ==
The mushroom is edible.
