= Sulfated polysaccharide =

Heparin is a medication and naturally occurring sulfated polysaccharide.

Sulfated polysaccharides are biopolymers found throughout life. These polysaccharides have sulfate groups attached to the sugar subunits. Brown seaweed and red seaweeds contain large amounts of these materials. Some of these natural materials are of practical value, e.g. as precursors to agar. Some sulfated polysaccharides are bioactive fucoidan and heparin.

== Structures ==
Structure of beta-d-glucopyranose 6-sulphate, a component of many sulfated polysaccharides.

Sulfated polysaccharides are polymers containing multiple sulfate esters (ROSO_{3}^{-}). The sulfate groups strongly affect the properties of the polymer, which otherwise is polar but not ionic. Although they are described as derivatives of sulfuric acid, they are not produced in that way. Instead, sulfate groups are introduced enzymatically by the action of O-sulfatases. Individual enzymes attach sulfate groups to 2-, 3-, and 6-hydroxyl groups of the sugar substrates.

For the purpose of structure elucidation, desulfation is sometimes conducted to give the parent polysaccharides. Both acidic and basic reagents can be used. The main issue is the possibility that the desulfation also affects the main polysaccharide chain.

Sulfated galactoses such as Keratan sulfate.
