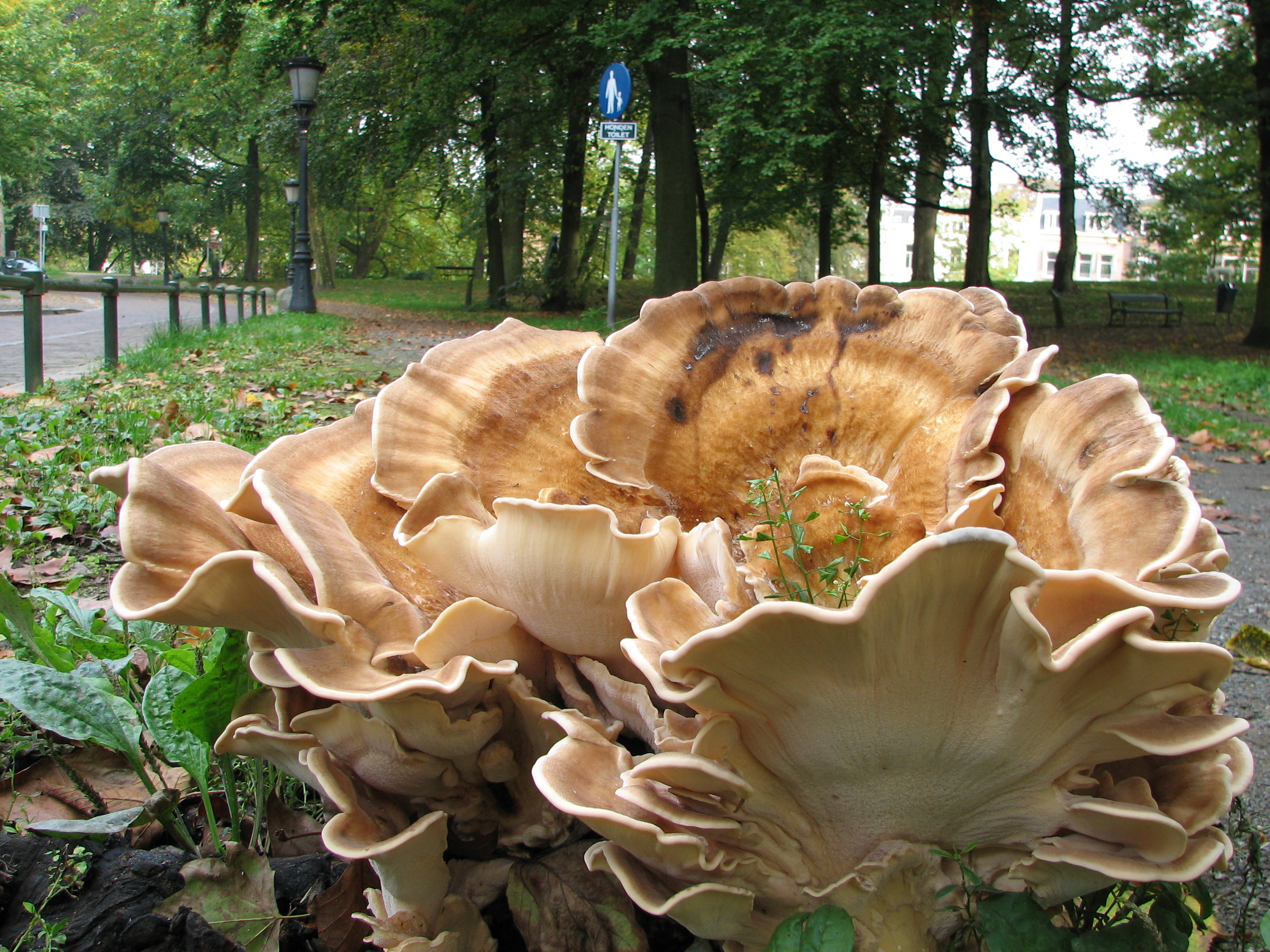
- Meripilus giganteus

Scientific classification
- Kingdom: Fungi
- Division: Basidiomycota
- Class: Agaricomycetes
- Order: Polyporales
- Family: Meripilaceae; Jülich (1982)

Type genus
- Meripilus P.Karst. (1882)

Synonyms
- Rigidoporaceae Jülich (1981)

= Meripilaceae =

Family of fungi

The Meripilaceae are a family of fungi in the order Polyporales. The family was circumscribed by Swiss mycologist Walter Jülich in 1982 with Meripilus as the type genus.

== Genera ==
Species Fungorum recognizes following genera:

- Flabellopilus
- Leucofomes
- Meripilus
- Porodon
- Pseudonadsoniella – Antarctic, Argentina, Galindez Island
- Rigidoporus
